= 2010 North Carolina Senate election =

- November 2, 2010

All 50 seats in the North Carolina Senate 26 (without Lieutenant Governor) seats needed for a majority
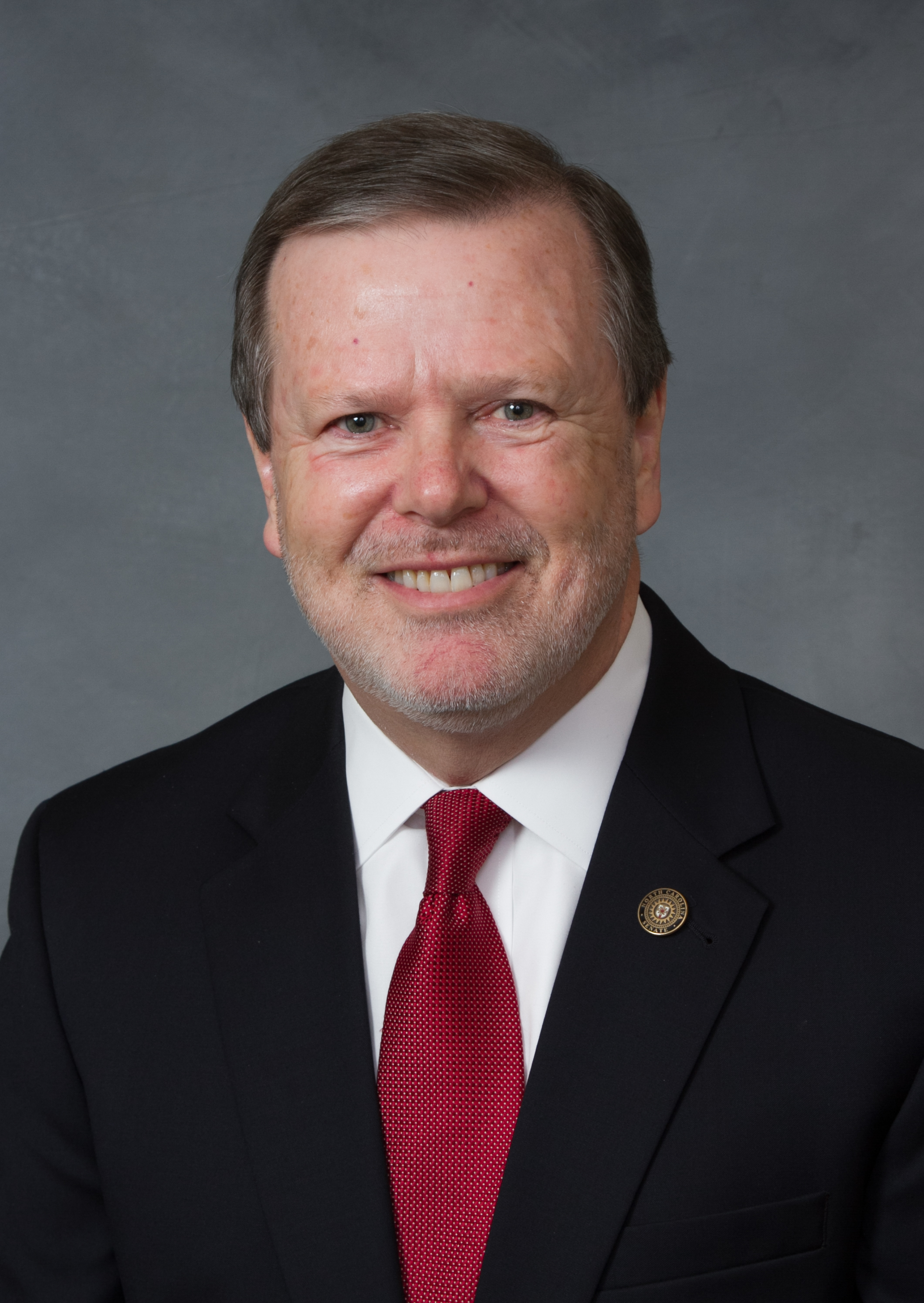

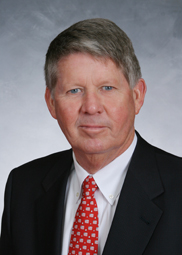
	Majority party	Minority party
Leader	Phil Berger	Marc Basnight
Party	Republican	Democratic
Leader since	January 1, 2005	January 1, 1993
Leader's seat	26th - Eden	1st - Manteo
Last election	20	30
Seats won	31	19
Seat change	▲11	▼11
- Results: Democratic hold Republican hold Republican gain
President pro tempore before election
Marc Basnight
Democratic
Elected President pro tempore
Phil Berger
Republican

An election was held on November 2, 2010, to elect all 50 members to North Carolina's Senate. The election coincided with the elections for other offices, U.S. Senate, U.S. House of Representatives, and state house. The primary election was held on May 4, 2010, with a run-off on June 22, 2010. This was the first time since 1896 that Republicans won the most seats in the Senate.

== Results summary ==
District	Incumbent	Party	Elected	Party
1st	Marc Basnight	Dem	Marc Basnight	Dem
2nd	Jean Preston	Rep	Jean Preston	Rep
3rd	Clark Jenkins	Dem	Clark Jenkins	Dem
4th	Edward Jones	Dem	Edward Jones	Dem
5th	Don Davis	Dem	Louis M. Pate Jr.	Rep
6th	Harry Brown	Rep	Harry Brown	Rep
7th	Doug Berger	Dem	Doug Berger	Dem
8th	R. C. Soles Jr.†	Dem	Bill Rabon	Rep
9th	Julia Boseman†	Dem	Thom Goolsby	Rep
10th	Charles Albertson†	Dem	Brent Jackson	Rep
11th	A. B. Swindell	Dem	Buck Newton	Rep
12th	David Rouzer	Rep	David Rouzer	Rep
13th	Michael Walters	Dem	Michael Walters	Dem
14th	Dan Blue	Dem	Dan Blue	Dem
15th	Neal Hunt	Rep	Neal Hunt	Rep
16th	Josh Stein	Dem	Josh Stein	Dem
17th	Richard Y. Stevens	Rep	Richard Y. Stevens	Rep
18th	Bob Atwater	Dem	Bob Atwater	Dem
19th	Margaret Dickson	Dem	Wesley Meredith	Rep
20th	Floyd McKissick Jr.	Dem	Floyd McKissick Jr.	Dem
21st	Larry Shaw†	Dem	Eric Mansfield	Dem
22nd	Harris Blake	Rep	Harris Blake	Rep
23rd	Eleanor Kinnaird	Dem	Eleanor Kinnaird	Dem
24th	Tony Foriest	Dem	Rick Gunn	Rep
25th	William R. Purcell	Dem	William R. Purcell	Dem
26th	Phil Berger	Rep	Phil Berger	Rep
27th	Don Vaughan	Dem	Don Vaughan	Dem
28th	Katie Dorsett†	Dem	Gladys A. Robinson	Dem
29th	Jerry W. Tillman	Rep	Jerry W. Tillman	Rep
30th	Don W. East	Rep	Don W. East	Rep
31st	Pete Brunstetter	Rep	Pete Brunstetter	Rep
32nd	Linda Garrou	Dem	Linda Garrou	Dem
33rd	Stan Bingham	Rep	Stan Bingham	Rep
34th	Andrew C. Brock	Rep	Andrew C. Brock	Rep
35th	Eddie Goodall†	Rep	Tommy Tucker	Rep
36th	Fletcher L. Hartsell Jr.	Rep	Fletcher L. Hartsell Jr.	Rep
37th	Dan Clodfelter	Dem	Dan Clodfelter	Dem
38th	Charlie Dannelly	Dem	Charlie Dannelly	Dem
39th	Bob Rucho	Rep	Bob Rucho	Rep
40th	Malcolm Graham	Dem	Malcolm Graham	Dem
41st	James Forrester	Rep	James Forrester	Rep
42nd	Austin M. Allran	Rep	Austin M. Allran	Rep
43rd	David W. Hoyle†	Dem	Kathy Harrington	Rep
44th	Jim Jacumin†	Rep	Warren Daniel	Rep
45th	Steve Goss	Dem	Dan Soucek	Rep
46th	Debbie Clary	Rep	Debbie Clary	Rep
47th	Joe Sam Queen	Dem	Ralph Hise	Rep
48th	Tom Apodaca	Rep	Tom Apodaca	Rep
49th	Martin Nesbitt	Dem	Martin Nesbitt	Dem
50th	John Snow	Dem	Jim Davis	Rep

† - Incumbent not seeking re-election

=== Incumbents defeated in general election ===
- Don Davis (D-District 5), defeated by Louis M. Pate Jr. (R)
- A. B. Swindell (D-District 11), defeated by Buck Newton (R)
- Margaret Dickson (D-District 19), defeated by Wesley Meredith (R)
- Tony Foriest (D-District 24), defeated by Rick Gunn (R)
- Steve Goss (D-District 45), defeated by Dan Soucek (R)
- Joe Sam Queen (D-District 47), defeated by Ralph Hise (R)
- John Snow (D-District 50), defeated by Jim Davis (R)

=== Open seats that changed parties ===
- R. C. Soles Jr. (D-District 8) didn't seek re-election, seat won by Bill Rabon (R)
- Julia Boseman (D-District 9) didn't seek re-election, seat won by Thom Goolsby (R)
- Charles Albertson (D-District 10) didn't seek re-election, seat won by Brent Jackson (R)
- David W. Hoyle (D-District 43) didn't seek re-election, seat won by Kathy Harrington (R)

== Predictions ==
Source	Ranking	As of
Governing	Tossup	November 1, 2010

== Detailed results ==
=== Districts 1–25 ===
==== District 1 ====
Incumbent Democratic President Pro Tempore Marc Basnight has represented the 1st district since 1985.

North Carolina Senate 1st district general election, 2010
Party	Candidate	Votes	%
Democratic	Marc Basnight (incumbent)	31,270	55.40%
Republican	Hood Richardson	25,169	44.60%
Total votes		56,439	100%
Democratic hold			

==== District 2 ====
Incumbent Republican Jean Preston has represented the 2nd district since 2007.

North Carolina Senate 2nd district general election, 2010
Party	Candidate	Votes	%
Republican	Jean Preston (incumbent)	36,390	65.72%
Democratic	Barbara Garrity-Blake	18,982	34.28%
Total votes		55,372	100%
Republican hold			

==== District 3 ====
Incumbent Democrat Clark Jenkins has represented the 3rd district since 2003.

North Carolina Senate 3rd district general election, 2010
Party	Candidate	Votes	%
Democratic	Clark Jenkins (incumbent)	27,586	62.72%
Republican	C. B. Daughtridge	16,399	37.28%
Total votes		43,985	100%
Democratic hold			

==== District 4 ====
Incumbent Democrat Edward Jones has represented the 4th district since 2007.

North Carolina Senate 4th district general election, 2010
Party	Candidate	Votes	%
Democratic	Edward Jones (incumbent)	29,169	62.55%
Republican	Rich Halbert	17,464	37.45%
Total votes		46,633	100%
Democratic hold			

==== District 5 ====
Incumbent Democrat Don Davis has represented the 5th district since 2009. In a rematch of the 2008 election, Davis was defeated for re-election by Republican Louis M. Pate Jr.

North Carolina Senate 5th district general election, 2010
Party	Candidate	Votes	%
Republican	Louis M. Pate Jr.	25,780	54.54%
Democratic	Don Davis (incumbent)	21,488	45.46%
Total votes		47,268	100%
Republican gain from Democratic			

==== District 6 ====
Incumbent Republican Harry Brown has represented the 6th district since 2005.

North Carolina Senate 6th district general election, 2010
Party	Candidate	Votes	%
Republican	Harry Brown (incumbent)	21,651	100%
Total votes		21,651	100%
Republican hold			

==== District 7 ====
Incumbent Democrat Doug Berger has represented the 7th district since 2005.

North Carolina Senate 7th district general election, 2010
Party	Candidate	Votes	%
Democratic	Doug Berger (incumbent)	27,084	51.80%
Republican	Michael Schriver	25,206	48.20%
Total votes		52,290	100%
Democratic hold			

==== District 8 ====
Incumbent Democrat R. C. Soles Jr. has represented the 8th district and its predecessors since 1977. Soles didn't seek re-election and Republican Bill Rabon won the open seat.

North Carolina Senate 8th district general election, 2010
Party	Candidate	Votes	%
Republican	Bill Rabon	46,216	63.55%
Democratic	David Redwine	26,511	36.45%
Total votes		72,727	100%
Republican gain from Democratic			

==== District 9 ====
Incumbent Democrat Julia Boseman has represented the 9th district since 2005. Boseman didn't seek re-election and instead ran for New Hanover County District Court Judge. Republican Thom Goolsby won the open seat.

North Carolina Senate 9th district general election, 2010
Party	Candidate	Votes	%
Republican	Thom Goolsby	36,701	57.44%
Democratic	Jim Leutze	27,189	42.56%
Total votes		63,890	100%
Republican gain from Democratic			

==== District 10 ====
Incumbent Democrat Charles Albertson has represented the 10th district and its predecessors since 1993. Albertson didn't seek re-election and Republican Brent Jackson won the open seat.

North Carolina Senate 10th district general election, 2010
Party	Candidate	Votes	%
Republican	Brent Jackson	25,342	52.24%
Democratic	Dewey Hudson	23,167	47.76%
Total votes		48,509	100%
Republican gain from Democratic			

==== District 11 ====
Incumbent Democrat A. B. Swindell has represented the 11th district since 2001. Swindell was defeated for re-election by Republican Buck Newton.

North Carolina Senate 11th district general election, 2010
Party	Candidate	Votes	%
Republican	Buck Newton	30,266	52.88%
Democratic	A. B. Swindell (incumbent)	26,970	47.12%
Total votes		57,236	100%
Republican gain from Democratic			

==== District 12 ====
Incumbent Republican David Rouzer has represented the 12th district since 2009.

North Carolina Senate 12th district general election, 2010
Party	Candidate	Votes	%
Republican	David Rouzer (incumbent)	40,242	69.66%
Democratic	Jody McLeod	17,525	30.34%
Total votes		57,767	100%
Republican hold			

==== District 13 ====
Incumbent Democrat Michael Walters has represented the 13th district since 2009.

North Carolina Senate 13th district general election, 2010
Party	Candidate	Votes	%
Democratic	Michael Walters (incumbent)	22,728	100%
Total votes		22,728	100%
Democratic hold			

==== District 14 ====
Incumbent Democrat Dan Blue has represented the 14th district since 2009.

North Carolina Senate 14th district general election, 2010
Party	Candidate	Votes	%
Democratic	Dan Blue (incumbent)	40,746	65.92%
Republican	Geoffrey M. Hurlburt	21,067	34.08%
Total votes		61,813	100%
Democratic hold			

==== District 15 ====
Incumbent Republican Neal Hunt has represented the 15th district since 2005.

North Carolina Senate 15th district general election, 2010
Party	Candidate	Votes	%
Republican	Neal Hunt (incumbent)	44,397	60.55%
Democratic	Charles Malone	28,928	39.45%
Total votes		73,325	100%
Republican hold			

==== District 16 ====
Incumbent Democrat Josh Stein has represented the 16th district since 2009.

North Carolina Senate 16th district general election, 2010
Party	Candidate	Votes	%
Democratic	Josh Stein (incumbent)	32,248	54.89%
Republican	Michael Beezley	24,466	41.64%
Libertarian	Stephanie E. Watson	2,040	3.47%
Total votes		58,754	100%
Democratic hold			

==== District 17 ====
Incumbent Republican Richard Y. Stevens has represented the 17th district since 2003.

North Carolina Senate 17th district general election, 2010
Party	Candidate	Votes	%
Republican	Richard Y. Stevens (incumbent)	51,391	63.75%
Democratic	David Donovan	29,217	36.25%
Total votes		80,608	100%
Republican hold			

==== District 18 ====
Incumbent Democrat Bob Atwater has represented the 18th district since 2005.

North Carolina Senate 18th district general election, 2010
Party	Candidate	Votes	%
Democratic	Bob Atwater (incumbent)	38,809	59.43%
Republican	Roger Gerber	26,488	40.57%
Total votes		65,297	100%
Democratic hold			

==== District 19 ====
Incumbent Democrat Margaret Dickson has represented the 19th district since 2010.

North Carolina Senate 19th district general election, 2010
Party	Candidate	Votes	%
Republican	Wesley Meredith	25,047	51.10%
Democratic	Margaret Dickson (incumbent)	23,964	48.90%
Total votes		49,011	100%
Republican gain from Democratic			

==== District 20 ====
Incumbent Democrat Floyd McKissick Jr. has represented the 20th district since 2007.

North Carolina Senate 20th district general election, 2010
Party	Candidate	Votes	%
Democratic	Floyd McKissick Jr. (incumbent)	38,309	73.11%
Republican	John Tarantino	14,092	26.89%
Total votes		52,401	100%
Democratic hold			

==== District 21 ====
Incumbent Democrat Larry Shaw has represented the 21st district and its predecessors since 1995. Shaw didn't seek re-election and Democrat Eric Mansfield won the open seat.

North Carolina Senate 21st district general election, 2010
Party	Candidate	Votes	%
Democratic	Eric Mansfield	21,004	67.61%
Republican	Wade Fowler	10,062	32.39%
Total votes		31,066	100%
Democratic hold			

==== District 22 ====
Incumbent Republican Harris Blake has represented the 22nd district since 2003.

North Carolina Senate 22nd district general election, 2010
Party	Candidate	Votes	%
Republican	Harris Blake (incumbent)	38,331	100%
Total votes		38,331	100%
Republican hold			

==== District 23 ====
Incumbent Democrat Eleanor Kinnaird has represented the 23rd district and its predecessors since 1997.

North Carolina Senate 23rd district general election, 2010
Party	Candidate	Votes	%
Democratic	Eleanor Kinnaird (incumbent)	36,611	64.87%
Republican	Ryan A. Hilliard	19,828	35.13%
Total votes		56,439	100%
Democratic hold			

==== District 24 ====
Incumbent Democrat Tony Foriest has represented the 24th district since 2007. He was defeated for re-election by Republican Rick Gunn.

North Carolina Senate 24th district general election, 2010
Party	Candidate	Votes	%
Republican	Rick Gunn	25,674	52.92%
Democratic	Tony Foriest (incumbent)	20,430	42.11%
Libertarian	Barry Coe	2,412	4.97%
Total votes		48,516	100%
Republican gain from Democratic			

==== District 25 ====
Incumbent Democrat William R. Purcell has represented the 25th district and its predecessors since 1997.

North Carolina Senate 25th district general election, 2010
Party	Candidate	Votes	%
Democratic	William R. Purcell (incumbent)	23,363	51.25%
Republican	P. Jason Phibbs	22,219	48.75%
Total votes		45,582	100%
Democratic hold			

=== Districts 26–50 ===
==== District 26 ====
Incumbent Republican Minority Leader Phil Berger has represented the 26th district since and its predecessors since 2001.

North Carolina Senate 26th district general election, 2010
Party	Candidate	Votes	%
Republican	Phil Berger (incumbent)	43,952	100%
Total votes		43,952	100%
Republican hold			

==== District 27 ====
Incumbent Democrat Don Vaughan has represented the 27th district since 2009.

North Carolina Senate 27th district general election, 2010
Party	Candidate	Votes	%
Democratic	Don Vaughan (incumbent)	30,161	59.66%
Republican	Jeffrey T. "Jeff" Hyde	20,398	40.34%
Total votes		50,559	100%
Democratic hold			

==== District 28 ====
Incumbent Democrat Katie Dorsett has represented the 28th district since 2003. Dorsett didn't seek re-election and Democrat Gladys A. Robinson won the open seat.

North Carolina Senate 28th district general election, 2010
Party	Candidate	Votes	%
Democratic	Gladys A. Robinson	21,496	47.84%
Republican	Trudy Wade	17,383	38.69%
Unaffaliated	Bruce Davis	6,054	13.47%
Total votes		44,933	100%
Democratic hold			

==== District 29 ====
Incumbent Republican Jerry W. Tillman has represented the 29th district since 2003

North Carolina Senate 29th district general election, 2010
Party	Candidate	Votes	%
Republican	Jerry W. Tillman (incumbent)	31,791	100%
Total votes		31,791	100%
Republican hold			

==== District 30 ====
Incumbent Republican Don W. East has represented the 30th district since 2005.

North Carolina Senate 30th district general election, 2010
Party	Candidate	Votes	%
Republican	Don W. East (incumbent)	32,422	67.83%
Democratic	Ric Marshall	15,376	32.17%
Total votes		47,798	100%
Republican hold			

==== District 31 ====
Incumbent Republican Pete Brunstetter has represented the 31st district since 2006.

North Carolina Senate 31st district general election, 2010
Party	Candidate	Votes	%
Republican	Pete Brunstetter (incumbent)	43,080	100%
Total votes		43,080	100%
Republican hold			

==== District 32 ====
Incumbent Democrat Linda Garrou has represented the 32nd district and its predecessors since 1999.

North Carolina Senate 32nd district general election, 2010
Party	Candidate	Votes	%
Democratic	Linda Garrou (incumbent)	24,125	65.37%
Republican	Nathan Jones	12,780	34.63%
Total votes		36,905	100%
Democratic hold			

==== District 33 ====
Incumbent Republican Stan Bingham has represented the 33rd district and its predecessors since 2001.

North Carolina Senate 33rd district general election, 2010
Party	Candidate	Votes	%
Republican	Stan Bingham (incumbent)	38,859	100%
Total votes		38,859	100%
Republican hold			

==== District 34 ====
Incumbent Republican Andrew C. Brock has represented the 34th district since 2003.

North Carolina Senate 34th district general election, 2010
Party	Candidate	Votes	%
Republican	Andrew C. Brock (incumbent)	36,969	100%
Total votes		36,969	100%
Republican hold			

==== District 35 ====
Incumbent Republican Eddie Goodall has represented the 35th district since 2005. Goodall didn't seek re-election and Republican Tommy Tucker won the open seat.

North Carolina Senate 35th district general election, 2010
Party	Candidate	Votes	%
Republican	Tommy Tucker	44,624	71.38%
Democratic	Ed McGuire	17,890	28.62%
Total votes		62,514	100%
Republican hold			

==== District 36 ====
Incumbent Republican Fletcher L. Hartsell Jr. has represented the 36th district and its predecessors since 1991.

North Carolina Senate 36th district general election, 2010
Party	Candidate	Votes	%
Republican	Fletcher L. Hartsell Jr. (incumbent)	37,403	69.02%
Democratic	Mike Helms	16,790	30.98%
Total votes		54,193	100%
Republican hold			

==== District 37 ====
Incumbent Democrat Dan Clodfelter has represented the 37th district and its predecessors since 1999.

North Carolina Senate 37th district general election, 2010
Party	Candidate	Votes	%
Democratic	Dan Clodfelter (incumbent)	24,956	61.45%
Republican	C. Morgan Edwards	15,656	38.55%
Total votes		40,612	100%
Democratic hold			

==== District 38 ====
Incumbent Democrat Charlie Dannelly has represented the 38th district and its predecessors since 1995.

North Carolina Senate 38th district general election, 2010
Party	Candidate	Votes	%
Democratic	Charlie Dannelly (incumbent)	33,692	68.67%
Republican	Cedric Scott	15,369	31.33%
Total votes		49,061	100%
Democratic hold			

==== District 39 ====
Incumbent Republican Bob Rucho has represented the 39th district and its predecessors since 2008 and previously from 1997 to 2005.

North Carolina Senate 39th district general election, 2010
Party	Candidate	Votes	%
Republican	Bob Rucho (incumbent)	48,373	100%
Total votes		48,373	100%
Republican hold			

==== District 40 ====
Incumbent Democrat Malcolm Graham has represented the 40th district since 2005.

North Carolina Senate 40th district general election, 2010
Party	Candidate	Votes	%
Democratic	Malcolm Graham (incumbent)	32,168	58.16%
Republican	John Aneralla	23,145	41.84%
Total votes		55,313	100%
Democratic hold			

==== District 41 ====
Incumbent Republican James Forrester has represented the 41st district and its predecessors since 1991.

North Carolina Senate 41st district general election, 2010
Party	Candidate	Votes	%
Republican	James Forrester (incumbent)	43,461	100%
Total votes		43,461	100%
Republican hold			

==== District 42 ====
Incumbent Republican Austin M. Allran has represented the 42nd district and its predecessors since 1987.

North Carolina Senate 42nd district general election, 2010
Party	Candidate	Votes	%
Republican	Austin M. Allran (incumbent)	37,429	100%
Total votes		37,429	100%
Republican hold			

==== District 43 ====
Incumbent Democrat David W. Hoyle has represented the 43rd district and its predecessors since 1993. Hoyle didn't seek re-election and Republican Kathy Harrington won the open seat.

North Carolina Senate 43rd district general election, 2010
Party	Candidate	Votes	%
Republican	Kathy Harrington	28,504	69.54%
Democratic	Jim Long	12,488	30.46%
Total votes		40,992	100%
Republican gain from Democratic			

==== District 44 ====
Incumbent Republican Jim Jacumin has represented the 44th district since 2005. Jacumin didn't seek re-election and Republican Warren Daniel won the open seat.

North Carolina Senate 44th district general election, 2010
Party	Candidate	Votes	%
Republican	Warren Daniel	26,314	58.87%
Democratic	Beth Jones	17,300	38.71%
Libertarian	Richard C. Evey	1,083	2.42%
Total votes		44,697	100%
Republican hold			

==== District 45 ====
Incumbent Democrat Steve Goss has represented the 45th district since 2007. Goss was defeated for re-election by Republican Dan Soucek.

North Carolina Senate 45th district general election, 2010
Party	Candidate	Votes	%
Republican	Dan Soucek	34,777	59.96%
Democratic	Steve Goss (incumbent)	23,223	40.04%
Total votes		58,000	100%
Republican gain from Democratic			

==== District 46 ====
Incumbent Republican Debbie Clary represented the 46th district since 2009.

North Carolina Senate 46th district general election, 2010
Party	Candidate	Votes	%
Republican	Debbie Clary (incumbent)	32,007	100%
Total votes		32,007	100%
Republican hold			

==== District 47 ====
Incumbent Democrat Joe Sam Queen has represented the 47th district since 2007, and previously from 2003 to 2005. Queen was defeated for re-election by Republican Ralph Hise.

North Carolina Senate 47th district general election, 2010
Party	Candidate	Votes	%
Republican	Ralph Hise	31,846	55.82%
Democratic	Joe Sam Queen (incumbent)	25,209	44.18%
Total votes		57,055	100%
Republican gain from Democratic			

==== District 48 ====
Incumbent Republican Tom Apodaca has represented the 48th district since 2003.

North Carolina Senate 48th district general election, 2010
Party	Candidate	Votes	%
Republican	Tom Apodaca (incumbent)	43,457	65.94%
Democratic	Chris Dixon	22,447	34.06%
Total votes		65,904	100%
Republican hold			

==== District 49 ====
Incumbent Democratic Majority Leader Martin Nesbitt has represented the 49th district since 2004.

North Carolina Senate 49th district general election, 2010
Party	Candidate	Votes	%
Democratic	Martin Nesbitt (incumbent)	33,254	59.37%
Republican	R. L. Clark	22,757	40.63%
Total votes		56,011	100%
Democratic hold			

==== District 50 ====
Incumbent Democrat John Snow has represented the 50th district since 2005. He was defeated for re-election by Republican Jim Davis.

North Carolina Senate 50th district general election, 2010
Party	Candidate	Votes	%
Republican	Jim Davis	31,041	50.13%
Democratic	John Snow (incumbent)	30,880	49.87%
Total votes		61,921	100%
Republican gain from Democratic			

== See also ==
- 2010 North Carolina elections
- List of North Carolina state legislatures
