= 2008 North Carolina Senate election =

- November 4, 2008

All 50 seats in the North Carolina Senate 26 (without Lieutenant Governor) seats needed for a majority
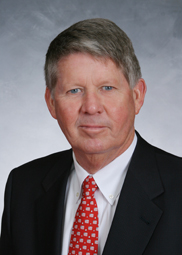

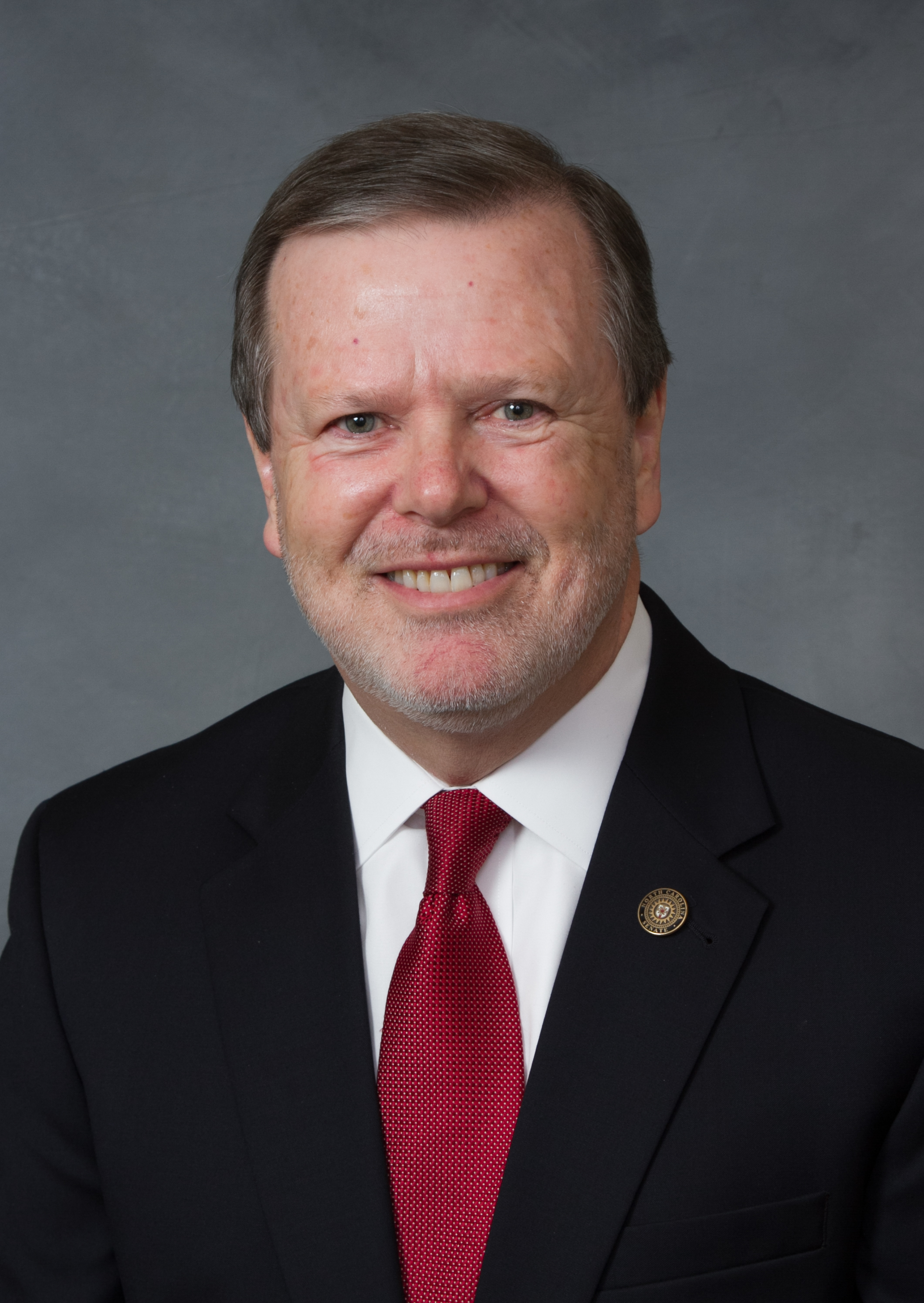
	Majority party	Minority party
Leader	Marc Basnight	Phil Berger
Party	Democratic	Republican
Leader since	January 1, 1993	January 1, 2005
Leader's seat	1st - Manteo	26th - Eden
Last election	31	19
Seats won	30	20
Seat change	▼1	▲1
Popular vote	1,821,994	1,769,130
Percentage	51.50%	47.40%
- Results: Democratic hold Republican hold Republican gain
President pro tempore before election
Marc Basnight
Democratic
Elected President pro tempore
Marc Basnight
Democratic

The 2008 North Carolina Senate election was held on November 5, 2008, to elect members to all fifty seats in the North Carolina Senate. The primary election was held on May 6, 2008, with a primary run-off occurring on June 24, 2008.

== Results summary ==
District	Incumbent	Party	Elected	Party
1st	Marc Basnight	Dem	Marc Basnight	Dem
2nd	Jean Preston	Rep	Jean Preston	Rep
3rd	Clark Jenkins	Dem	Clark Jenkins	Dem
4th	Edward Jones	Dem	Edward Jones	Dem
5th	John H. Kerr III†	Dem	Don Davis	Dem
6th	Harry Brown	Rep	Harry Brown	Rep
7th	Doug Berger	Dem	Doug Berger	Dem
8th	R. C. Soles Jr.	Dem	R. C. Soles Jr.	Dem
9th	Julia Boseman	Dem	Julia Boseman	Dem
10th	Charles W. Albertson	Dem	Charles W. Albertson	Dem
11th	A. B. Swindell	Dem	A. B. Swindell	Dem
12th	Fred Smith†	Rep	David Rouzer	Rep
13th	David F. Weinstein	Dem	David F. Weinstein	Dem
14th	Vernon Malone	Dem	Vernon Malone	Dem
15th	Neal Hunt	Rep	Neal Hunt	Rep
16th	Janet Cowell†	Dem	Josh Stein	Dem
17th	Richard Y. Stevens	Rep	Richard Y. Stevens	Rep
18th	Bob Atwater	Dem	Bob Atwater	Dem
19th	Tony Rand	Dem	Tony Rand	Dem
20th	Floyd McKissick Jr.	Dem	Floyd McKissick Jr.	Dem
21st	Larry Shaw	Dem	Larry Shaw	Dem
22nd	Harris Blake	Rep	Harris Blake	Rep
23rd	Eleanor Kinnaird	Dem	Eleanor Kinnaird	Dem
24th	Anthony Foriest	Dem	Anthony Foriest	Dem
25th	William R. Purcell	Dem	William R. Purcell	Dem
26th	Phil Berger	Rep	Phil Berger	Rep
27th	Kay Hagan†	Dem	Don Vaughan	Dem
28th	Katie G. Dorsett	Dem	Katie G. Dorsett	Dem
29th	Jerry W. Tillman	Rep	Jerry W. Tillman	Rep
30th	Don W. East	Rep	Don W. East	Rep
31st	Peter S. Brunstetter	Rep	Peter S. Brunstetter	Rep
32nd	Linda Garrou	Dem	Linda Garrou	Dem
33rd	Stan Bingham	Rep	Stan Bingham	Rep
34th	Andrew C. Brock	Rep	Andrew C. Brock	Rep
35th	Eddie Goodall	Rep	Eddie Goodall	Rep
36th	Fletcher L. Hartsell Jr.	Rep	Fletcher L. Hartsell Jr.	Rep
37th	Dan Clodfelter	Dem	Dan Clodfelter	Dem
38th	Charlie Dannelly	Dem	Charlie Dannelly	Dem
39th	Bob Rucho	Rep	Bob Rucho	Rep
40th	Malcolm Graham	Dem	Malcolm Graham	Dem
41st	James Forrester	Rep	James Forrester	Rep
42nd	Austin M. Allran	Rep	Austin M. Allran	Rep
43rd	David W. Hoyle	Dem	David W. Hoyle	Dem
44th	Jim Jacumin	Rep	Jim Jacumin	Rep
45th	Steve Goss	Dem	Steve Goss	Dem
46th	Walter Dalton†	Dem	Debbie Clary	Rep
47th	Joe Sam Queen	Dem	Joe Sam Queen	Dem
48th	Tom Apodaca	Rep	Tom Apodaca	Rep
49th	Martin Nesbitt	Dem	Martin Nesbitt	Dem
50th	John J. Snow Jr.	Dem	John J. Snow Jr.	Dem

† - Incumbent not seeking re-election

Party	Candi- dates	Votes		Seats		
Party	Candi- dates	No.	%	No.	+/–	%
Democratic Party	39	1,821,994	50.166%	30	▼1	60%
Republican Party	40	1,769,130	48.710%	20	▲1	40%
Libertarian Party	8	40,813	1.124%	0	Steady	0%
Total	87	3,631,937	100.00%	50	Steady	100.00%

Senate seats
Democratic	60%
Republican	40%

Popular vote
Democratic	50.166%
Republican	48.710%
Libertarian	1.124%

=== Open seats that changed parties ===
- Walter Dalton (D-District 46) ran for Lieutenant Governor, seat won by Debbie Clary (R)

== Predictions ==
Source	Ranking	As of
Stateline	Lean D	October 15, 2008

== Detailed results ==
=== Districts 1–25 ===
==== District 1 ====
Incumbent Democrat President Pro Tempore Marc Basnight has represented the 1st district since 1985.

North Carolina Senate 1st district general election, 2008
Party	Candidate	Votes	%
Democratic	Marc Basnight (incumbent)	62,661	100%
Total votes		62,661	100%
Democratic hold			

==== District 2 ====
Incumbent Republican Jean Preston has represented the 2nd district since 2007.

North Carolina Senate 2nd district general election, 2008
Party	Candidate	Votes	%
Republican	Jean Preston (incumbent)	51,117	61.61%
Democratic	Greg D. Muse	31,849	38.39%
Total votes		82,966	100%
Republican hold			

==== District 3 ====
Incumbent Democrat Clark Jenkins has represented the 3rd district since 2003.

North Carolina Senate 3rd district general election, 2008
Party	Candidate	Votes	%
Democratic	Clark Jenkins (incumbent)	57,703	100%
Total votes		57,703	100%
Democratic hold			

==== District 4 ====
Incumbent Democrat Edward Jones has represented the 4th district since 2007.

North Carolina Senate 4th district general election, 2008
Party	Candidate	Votes	%
Democratic	Edward Jones (incumbent)	57,429	100%
Total votes		57,429	100%
Democratic hold			

==== District 5 ====
Incumbent Democrat John H. Kerr III has represented the 5th district and its predecessors since 1993. Kerr didn't seek re-election and Democrat Don Davis won the open seat.

North Carolina Senate 5th district general election, 2008
Party	Candidate	Votes	%
Democratic	Don Davis	40,982	52.90%
Republican	Louis Pate	36,493	47.10%
Total votes		77,475	100%
Democratic hold			

==== District 6 ====
Incumbent Republican Harry Brown has represented the 6th district since 2005.

North Carolina Senate 6th district general election, 2008
Party	Candidate	Votes	%
Republican	Harry Brown (incumbent)	38,139	100%
Total votes		38,139	100%
Republican hold			

==== District 7 ====
Incumbent Democrat Doug Berger has represented the 7th district since 2005.

North Carolina Senate 7th district general election, 2008
Party	Candidate	Votes	%
Democratic	Doug Berger (incumbent)	48,874	61.25%
Republican	Chuck Stires	28,588	35.83%
Libertarian	Kira Howe	2,331	2.92%
Total votes		79,793	100%
Democratic hold			

==== District 8 ====
Incumbent Democrat R. C. Soles Jr. has represented the 8th district and its predecessors since 1977.

North Carolina Senate 8th district general election, 2008
Party	Candidate	Votes	%
Democratic	R. C. Soles Jr. (incumbent)	47,905	48.66%
Republican	Bettie Fennell	45,093	45.80%
Libertarian	Rachel Joiner Merrill	5,454	5.54%
Total votes		98,452	100%
Democratic hold			

==== District 9 ====
Incumbent Democrat Julia Boseman has represented the 9th district since 2005.

North Carolina Senate 9th district general election, 2008
Party	Candidate	Votes	%
Democratic	Julia Boseman (incumbent)	50,516	51.67%
Republican	Michael Lee	47,244	48.33%
Total votes		97,760	100%
Democratic hold			

==== District 10 ====
Incumbent Democrat Charles W. Albertson has represented the 10th district and its predecessors since 1993.

North Carolina Senate 10th district general election, 2008
Party	Candidate	Votes	%
Democratic	Charles W. Albertson (incumbent)	51,375	100%
Total votes		51,375	100%
Democratic hold			

==== District 11 ====
Incumbent Democrat A. B. Swindell has represented the 11th district and its predecessors since 2001.

North Carolina Senate 11th district general election, 2008
Party	Candidate	Votes	%
Democratic	A. B. Swindell (incumbent)	59,461	100%
Total votes		59,461	100%
Democratic hold			

==== District 12 ====
Incumbent Republican Fred Smith has represented the 12th district since 2003. Smith ran for Governor and Republican David Rouzer won the open seat.

North Carolina Senate 12th district general election, 2008
Party	Candidate	Votes	%
Republican	David Rouzer	44,261	51.93%
Democratic	Kay Carroll	40,971	48.07%
Total votes		85,232	100%
Republican hold			

==== District 13 ====
Incumbent Democrat David F. Weinstein has represented the 13th district and its predecessors since 1997.

North Carolina Senate 13th district general election, 2008
Party	Candidate	Votes	%
Democratic	David F. Weinstein (incumbent)	45,776	100%
Total votes		45,776	100%
Democratic hold			

==== District 14 ====
Incumbent Democrat Vernon Malone has represented the 14th district since 2003.

North Carolina Senate 14th district general election, 2008
Party	Candidate	Votes	%
Democratic	Vernon Malone (incumbent)	67,823	69.45%
Republican	Carol Bennett	29,835	30.55%
Total votes		97,658	100%
Democratic hold			

==== District 15 ====
Incumbent Republican Neal Hunt has represented the 15th district since 2005.

North Carolina Senate 15th district general election, 2008
Party	Candidate	Votes	%
Republican	Neal Hunt (incumbent)	56,873	52.83%
Democratic	Chris Mintz	46,175	42.89%
Libertarian	Jan MacKay	4,602	4.27%
Total votes		107,650	100%
Republican hold			

==== District 16 ====
Incumbent Democrat Janet Cowell has represented the 16th district since 2005. Cowell ran for State Treasurer and Democrat Josh Stein won the open seat.

North Carolina Senate 16th district general election, 2008
Party	Candidate	Votes	%
Democratic	Josh Stein	58,357	60.82%
Republican	John Alexander	37,586	39.18%
Total votes		95,943	100%
Democratic hold			

==== District 17 ====
Incumbent Republican Richard Y. Stevens has represented the 17th district since 2003.

North Carolina Senate 17th district general election, 2008
Party	Candidate	Votes	%
Republican	Richard Y. Stevens (incumbent)	75,311	81.20%
Libertarian	Brian Irving	17,441	18.80%
Total votes		92,752	100%
Republican hold			

==== District 18 ====
Incumbent Democrat Bob Atwater has represented the 18th district since 2005.

North Carolina Senate 18th district general election, 2008
Party	Candidate	Votes	%
Democratic	Bob Atwater (incumbent)	66,916	69.00%
Republican	Roger Gerber	30,063	31.00%
Total votes		96,979	100%
Democratic hold			

==== District 19 ====
Incumbent Democrat Tony Rand has represented the 19th district and its predecessors since 1995.

North Carolina Senate 19th district general election, 2008
Party	Candidate	Votes	%
Democratic	Tony Rand (incumbent)	57,027	100%
Total votes		57,027	100%
Democratic hold			

==== District 20 ====
Incumbent Democrat Floyd McKissick Jr. has represented the 20th district since 2007.

North Carolina Senate 20th district general election, 2008
Party	Candidate	Votes	%
Democratic	Floyd McKissick Jr. (incumbent)	64,178	74.58%
Republican	Ken Chandler	19,666	22.55%
Libertarian	David C. Rollins	3,377	3.87%
Total votes		87,221	100%
Democratic hold			

==== District 21 ====
Incumbent Democrat Larry Shaw has represented the 21st district and its predecessors since 1995.

North Carolina Senate 21st district general election, 2008
Party	Candidate	Votes	%
Democratic	Larry Shaw (incumbent)	48,430	100%
Total votes		48,430	100%
Democratic hold			

==== District 22 ====
Incumbent Republican Harris Blake has represented the 22nd district since 2003.

North Carolina Senate 22nd district general election, 2008
Party	Candidate	Votes	%
Republican	Harris Blake (incumbent)	50,111	60.27%
Democratic	Abraham Oudeh	33,033	39.73%
Total votes		83,144	100%
Republican hold			

==== District 23 ====
Incumbent Democrat Eleanor Kinnaird has represented the 23rd district and its predecessors since 1997.

North Carolina Senate 23rd district general election, 2008
Party	Candidate	Votes	%
Democratic	Eleanor Kinnaird (incumbent)	62,192	70.90%
Republican	Greg Bass	25,527	29.10%
Total votes		62,192	100%
Democratic hold			

==== District 24 ====
Incumbent Democrat Anthony Foriest has represented the 24th district since 2007.

North Carolina Senate 24th district general election, 2008
Party	Candidate	Votes	%
Democratic	Anthony Foriest (incumbent)	38,539	52.51%
Republican	Rick Gunn	34,854	47.49%
Total votes		73,393	100%
Democratic hold			

==== District 25 ====
Incumbent Democrat William R. Purcell has represented the 25th district and its predecessors since 1997.

North Carolina Senate 25th district general election, 2008
Party	Candidate	Votes	%
Democratic	William R. Purcell (incumbent)	42,760	60.84%
Republican	Janice B. Abernathy	27,519	39.16%
Total votes		70,279	100%
Democratic hold			

=== Districts 26–50 ===
==== District 26 ====
Incumbent Republican Minority Leader Phil Berger has represented the 26th district since and its predecessors since 2001.

North Carolina Senate 26th district general election, 2008
Party	Candidate	Votes	%
Republican	Phil Berger (incumbent)	65,392	100%
Total votes		65,392	100%
Republican hold			

==== District 27 ====
Incumbent Democrat Kay Hagan has represented the 27th district and its predecessors since 1999. Hagan ran for the U.S Senate and Democrat Don Vaughan won the open seat.

North Carolina Senate 27th district general election, 2008
Party	Candidate	Votes	%
Democratic	Don Vaughan	59,609	68.75%
Republican	Joe Wilson	27,100	31.25%
Total votes		86,709	100%
Democratic hold			

==== District 28 ====
Incumbent Democrat Katie G. Dorsett has represented the 28th district since 2003.

2008 North Carolina Senate District 28th district general election, 2008
Party	Candidate	Votes	%
Democratic	Katie G. Dorsett (incumbent)	61,911	100%
Total votes		61,911	100%
Democratic hold			

==== District 29 ====
Incumbent Republican Jerry W. Tillman has represented the 29th district since 2003.

North Carolina Senate 29th district general election, 2008
Party	Candidate	Votes	%
Republican	Jerry W. Tillman (incumbent)	45,614	68.00%
Democratic	Ronald Franklin	21,316	31.78%
Unaffiliated	Write-ins	146	0.22%
Total votes		67,076	100%
Republican hold			

==== District 30 ====
Incumbent Republican Don W. East has represented the 30th district since 2005.

North Carolina Senate 30th district general election, 2008
Party	Candidate	Votes	%
Republican	Don W. East (incumbent)	52,754	100%
Total votes		52,754	100%
Republican hold			

==== District 31 ====
Incumbent Republican Peter S. Brunstetter has represented the 31st district since 2006.

North Carolina Senate 31st district general election, 2008
Party	Candidate	Votes	%
Republican	Peter S. Brunstetter (incumbent)	65,201	100%
Total votes		65,201	100%
Republican hold			

==== District 32 ====
Incumbent Democrat Linda Garrou has represented the 32nd district and its predecessors since 1999.

North Carolina Senate 32nd district general election, 2008
Party	Candidate	Votes	%
Democratic	Linda Garrou (incumbent)	57,672	100%
Total votes		57,672	100%
Democratic hold			

==== District 33 ====
Incumbent Republican Stan Bingham has represented the 33rd district and its predecessors since 2001.

North Carolina Senate 33rd district general election, 2008
Party	Candidate	Votes	%
Republican	Stan Bingham (incumbent)	61,387	100%
Total votes		61,387	100%

==== District 34 ====
Incumbent Republican Andrew C. Brock has represented the 34th district since 2003.

North Carolina Senate 34th district general election, 2008
Party	Candidate	Votes	%
Republican	Andrew C. Brock (incumbent)	47,960	61.17%
Democratic	John Carlyle Sherrill III	30,443	38.83%
Total votes		78,403	100%
Republican hold			

==== District 35 ====
Incumbent Republican Eddie Goodall has represented the 35th district since 2005.

North Carolina Senate District 35th district general election, 2008
Party	Candidate	Votes	%
Republican	Eddie Goodall (incumbent)	75,025	100%
Total votes		75,025	100%
Republican hold			

==== District 36 ====
Incumbent Republican Fletcher L. Hartsell Jr. has represented the 36th district and its predecessors since 1991.

North Carolina Senate 36th district general election, 2008
Party	Candidate	Votes	%
Republican	Fletcher L. Hartsell Jr. (incumbent)	50,052	56.81%
Democratic	Charles Paxton	38,047	43.19%
Total votes		88,099	100%
Republican hold			

==== District 37 ====
Incumbent Democrat Dan Clodfelter has represented the 37th district and its predecessors since 1999.

North Carolina Senate 37th district general election, 2008
Party	Candidate	Votes	%
Democratic	Dan Clodfelter (incumbent)	48,608	67.84%
Republican	Vince Coscia	30,315	28.35%
Libertarian	Rusty Sheridan	2,733	3.81%
Total votes		71,656	100%
Democratic hold			

==== District 38 ====
Incumbent Democrat Charlie Dannelly has represented the 38th district and its predecessors since 1995.

North Carolina Senate 38th district general election, 2008
Party	Candidate	Votes	%
Democratic	Charlie Dannelly (incumbent)	67,755	73.33%
Republican	James R. Soder	22,056	23.87%
Libertarian	C. Travis Wheat	2,588	2.80%
Total votes		92,399	100%
Democratic hold			

==== District 39 ====
Incumbent Republican Bob Rucho has represented the 39th district and its predecessors since 2008 and previously from 1997 to 2005.

North Carolina Senate 39th district general election, 2008
Party	Candidate	Votes	%
Republican	Bob Rucho (incumbent)	73,799	100%
Total votes		73,799	100%
Republican hold			

==== District 40 ====
Incumbent Democrat Malcolm Graham has represented the 40th district since 2005.

North Carolina Senate 40th district general election, 2008
Party	Candidate	Votes	%
Democratic	Malcolm Graham (incumbent)	66,307	66.96%
Republican	Ed Mulheren	32,711	33.04%
Total votes		99,018	100%
Democratic hold			

==== District 41 ====
Incumbent Republican James Forrester has represented the 41st district and its predecessors since 1991.

North Carolina Senate 41st district general election, 2008
Party	Candidate	Votes	%
Republican	James Forrester (incumbent)	67,211	100%
Total votes		67,211	100%
Republican hold			

==== District 42 ====
Incumbent Republican Austin M. Allran has represented the 42nd district and its predecessors since 1987.

North Carolina Senate 42nd district general election, 2008
Party	Candidate	Votes	%
Republican	Austin M. Allran (incumbent)	59,574	100%
Total votes		59,574	100%
Republican hold			

==== District 43 ====
Incumbent Democrat David W. Hoyle has represented the 43rd district and its predecessors since 1993.

North Carolina Senate 43rd district general election, 2008
Party	Candidate	Votes	%
Democratic	David W. Hoyle (incumbent)	35,838	51.47
Republican	Kathy Harrington	33,791	48.53
Total votes		69,629	100%
Democratic hold			

==== District 44 ====
Incumbent Republican Jim Jacumin has represented the 44th district since 2005.

North Carolina 44th district general election, 2008
Party	Candidate	Votes	%
Republican	Jim Jacumin (incumbent)	41,320	57.88%
Democratic	Jim Cates	27,782	38.92%
Libertarian	Richard C. Evey	2,287	3.20%
Total votes		71,389	100%
Republican hold			

==== District 45 ====
Incumbent Democrat Steve Goss has represented the 45th district since 2007.

North Carolina Senate 45th district general election, 2008
Party	Candidate	Votes	%
Democratic	Steve Goss (incumbent)	46,014	53.90%
Republican	Jerry Butler	39,349	46.10%
Total votes		85,363	100%
Democratic hold			

==== District 46 ====
Incumbent Democrat Walter Dalton has represented the 46th district and its predecessors since 1997.
Dalton ran for Lieutenant Governor. Republican Debbie Clary won the open seat.

North Carolina Senate 46th district general election, 2008
Party	Candidate	Votes	%
Republican	Debbie Clary	36,059	50.50%
Democratic	Keith H. Melton	35,338	49.50%
Total votes		71,397	100%
Republican gain from Democratic			

==== District 47 ====
Incumbent Democrat Joe Sam Queen has represented the 47th district since 2007, and previously from 2003 to 2005.

North Carolina Senate 47th district general election, 2008
Party	Candidate	Votes	%
Democratic	Joe Sam Queen (incumbent)	41,736	53.59%
Republican	Keith Presnell	36,144	46.41%
Total votes		77,880	100%
Democratic hold			

==== District 48 ====
Incumbent Republican Tom Apodaca has represented the 48th district since 2003.

North Carolina Senate 48th district general election, 2008
Party	Candidate	Votes	%
Republican	Tom Apodaca (incumbent)	64,183	100%
Total votes		64,183	100%
Republican hold			

==== District 49 ====
Incumbent Democratic Majority Leader Martin Nesbitt has represented the 49th district since 2004.

North Carolina Senate 49th district general election, 2008
Party	Candidate	Votes	%
Democratic	Martin Nesbitt (incumbent)	56,150	65.64%
Republican	R. L. Clark	29,391	34.36%
Total votes		85,541	100%
Democratic hold			

==== District 50 ====
Incumbent Democrat John J. Snow Jr. has represented the 50th district since 2005.

North Carolina Senate 50th district general election, 2008
Party	Candidate	Votes	%
Democratic	John J. Snow Jr. (incumbent)	46,536	57.45%
Republican	Susan C. Pons	34,462	42.55%
Total votes		80,998	100%
Democratic hold			

== See also ==
- List of North Carolina state legislatures
