= Fern Shubert =

American politician (born 1947)

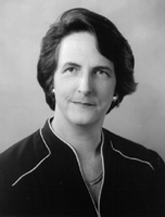

Member of the North Carolina Senate from the 35th district
- In office January 1, 2003 – January 1, 2005
- Preceded by: Aaron Plyler (Redistricting)
- Succeeded by: Eddie Goodall

Member of the North Carolina House of Representatives from the 34th district
- In office January 1, 2001 – January 1, 2003
- Preceded by: O. Max Melton
- Succeeded by: Curtis Blackwood (Redistricting)
- In office January 1, 1995 – January 1, 1999
- Preceded by: Bobby Griffin
- Succeeded by: O. Max Melton

Personal details
- Born: Fern Haywood Shubert; August 30, 1947 (age 79) Durham, North Carolina, U.S.
- Party: Republican
- Spouse: Jerry
- Children: 2
- Education: Duke University (BA)

Fern H. Shubert (born August 30, 1947) is a former Republican member of the North Carolina General Assembly representing the state's thirty-fifth Senate district, including constituents in Mecklenburg and Union counties. An accountant from Marshville, North Carolina, Shubert served in the State House from 1994 to 1998 and again from 2000 to 2002. She served in the State Senate from 2002 to 2004, where she was the Republican whip.

== Life and career ==
Before it folded, she wrote a column for The County Edge, a weekly publication in Union County, and she has continued to comment on local political issues, including opposition to a proposed half-cent prepared food and beverage tax intended to help fund a civic center in Monroe.

Shubert was one of the candidates for the Republican gubernatorial nomination to challenge Governor Mike Easley in the 2004 election. The sole woman in a field of six contenders for the GOP nomination, Shubert campaigned as an outsider to the party establishment, but placed fifth in the primary, gathering only 4% of votes cast.

Shubert ran to return to her old Senate seat in 2010. She lost the Republican primary on May 4 to Tommy Tucker. In 2012, Shubert filed to run for North Carolina State Auditor.

On March 11, 2019, Shubert filed to run in the Republican primary to select a candidate for the 9th Congressional district 2019 special election, ordered by the North Carolina State Board of Elections after the Board declined to certify the race's November 6, 2018 outcome due to allegations of election fraud.

North Carolina House of Representatives
Preceded by Bobby Griffin	Member of the North Carolina House of Representatives from the 34th district 1995–1999	Succeeded by O. Max Melton
Preceded by O. Max Melton	Member of the North Carolina House of Representatives from the 34th district 2001–2003	Succeeded by Don Munford
North Carolina Senate
Preceded by Bob Rucho	Member of the North Carolina Senate from the 35th district 2003–2005	Succeeded by Eddie Goodall
