= Senator East =

Senator East may refer to:

- Don W. East (1944–2012), North Carolina State Senate
- John Porter East (1931–1986), U.S. Senator from North Carolina
