= North Carolina's 17th Senate district =

American legislative district

North Carolina's 17th State Senate district
Senator
Sydney Batch; D–Holly Springs
- Demographics: 69% White; 10% Black; 9% Hispanic; 7% Asian; 1% Other; 4% Multiracial
- Population (2023): 206,091

North Carolina's 17th Senate district is one of 50 districts in the North Carolina Senate. It has been represented by Democrat Sydney Batch since 2021.

== Geography ==
Since 2003, the district has included part of Wake County. The district overlaps with the 11th, 21st, 36th, and 41st state house districts.

== District officeholders since 1973 ==
=== Multi-member district ===
Senator	Party	Dates	Notes	Senator	Party	Dates	Notes	Counties
James Banks "Jim" Garrison (Albemarle)	Democratic	January 1, 1973 – January 1, 1983		Charles Deane Jr. (Rockingham)	Democratic	January 1, 1973 – January 1, 1975	Redistricted from the 19th district.	1973–1993; All of Union, Anson, Stanly, Montgomery, Richmond, and Scotland counties.
James Banks "Jim" Garrison (Albemarle)	Democratic	January 1, 1973 – January 1, 1983		Mary Odom (Wagram)	Democratic	January 1, 1975 – January 1, 1977		1973–1993; All of Union, Anson, Stanly, Montgomery, Richmond, and Scotland counties.
James Banks "Jim" Garrison (Albemarle)	Democratic	January 1, 1973 – January 1, 1983		Bob Jordan (Mount Gilead)	Democratic	January 1, 1977 – January 1, 1985	Retired to run for Lieutenant Governor.	1973–1993; All of Union, Anson, Stanly, Montgomery, Richmond, and Scotland counties.
Aaron Plyler (Monroe)	Democratic	January 1, 1983 – January 1, 2003	Redistricted to the 35th district and retired.	Bob Jordan (Mount Gilead)	Democratic	January 1, 1977 – January 1, 1985	Retired to run for Lieutenant Governor.	1973–1993; All of Union, Anson, Stanly, Montgomery, Richmond, and Scotland counties.
Aaron Plyler (Monroe)	Democratic	January 1, 1983 – January 1, 2003	Redistricted to the 35th district and retired.	J. Richard Conder (Rockingham)	Democratic	January 1, 1985 – July 17, 1997	Resigned.	1973–1993; All of Union, Anson, Stanly, Montgomery, Richmond, and Scotland counties.
Aaron Plyler (Monroe)	Democratic	January 1, 1983 – January 1, 2003	Redistricted to the 35th district and retired.	J. Richard Conder (Rockingham)	Democratic	January 1, 1985 – July 17, 1997	Resigned.	1993–2003; All of Union, Anson, Montgomery, Richmond, and Scotland counties. Parts of Stanly and Hoke counties.
Aaron Plyler (Monroe)	Democratic	January 1, 1983 – January 1, 2003	Redistricted to the 35th district and retired.	Vacant		July 17, 1997 – July 23, 1997		1993–2003; All of Union, Anson, Montgomery, Richmond, and Scotland counties. Parts of Stanly and Hoke counties.
Aaron Plyler (Monroe)	Democratic	January 1, 1983 – January 1, 2003	Redistricted to the 35th district and retired.	Bill Purcell (Laurinburg)	Democratic	July 23, 1997 – January 1, 2003	Appointed to finish Conder's term. Redistricted to the 25th district.	1993–2003; All of Union, Anson, Montgomery, Richmond, and Scotland counties. Parts of Stanly and Hoke counties.

=== Single-member district ===
Senator	Party	Dates	Notes	Counties
Richard Stevens (Cary)	Republican	January 1, 2003 – September 7, 2012	Retired and resigned early.	2003–Present; Part of Wake County.
Vacant		September 7, 2012 – October 4, 2012		2003–Present; Part of Wake County.
Tamara Barringer (Cary)	Republican	October 4, 2012 – January 1, 2019	Appointed to finish Steven's term. Lost re-election.	2003–Present; Part of Wake County.
Sam Searcy (Holly Springs)	Democratic	January 1, 2019 – December 30, 2020	Resigned.	2003–Present; Part of Wake County.
Vacant		December 30, 2020 – January 11, 2021		2003–Present; Part of Wake County.
Sydney Batch (Holly Springs)	Democratic	January 11, 2021 – Present	Appointed to finish Searcy's term.	2003–Present; Part of Wake County.

== Election results ==
=== 2024 ===
North Carolina Senate 17th district general election, 2024
Party	Candidate	Votes	%
Democratic	Sydney Batch (incumbent)	71,610	74.38%
Libertarian	Patrick Bowersox	24,661	25.62%
Total votes		96,271	100%
Democratic hold			

=== 2022 ===
North Carolina Senate 17th district general election, 2022
Party	Candidate	Votes	%
Democratic	Sydney Batch (incumbent)	45,279	51.83%
Republican	Mark Cavaliero	40,167	45.97%
Libertarian	Patrick Bowersox	1,922	2.20%
Total votes		87,368	100%
Democratic hold			

=== 2020 ===
North Carolina Senate 17th district general election, 2020
Party	Candidate	Votes	%
Democratic	Sam Searcy (incumbent)	83,564	51.41%
Republican	Mark Cavaliero	72,774	44.77%
Libertarian	Travis Groo	6,204	3.82%
Total votes		162,542	100%
Democratic hold			

=== 2018 ===
North Carolina Senate 17th district general election, 2018
Party	Candidate	Votes	%
Democratic	Sam Searcy	50,040	50.60%
Republican	Tamara Barringer (incumbent)	45,841	46.35%
Libertarian	Bruce Basson	3,016	3.05%
Total votes		98,897	100%
Democratic gain from Republican			

=== 2016 ===
North Carolina Senate 17th district general election, 2016
Party	Candidate	Votes	%
Republican	Tamara Barringer (incumbent)	59,105	48.30%
Democratic	Susan P. Evans	58,063	47.45%
Libertarian	Susan Hogarth	5,191	4.24%
Total votes		122,359	100%
Republican hold			

=== 2014 ===
North Carolina Senate 17th district general election, 2014
Party	Candidate	Votes	%
Republican	Tamara Barringer (incumbent)	44,292	58.46%
Democratic	Bryan Fulghum	31,476	41.54%
Total votes		75,768	100%
Republican hold			

=== 2012 ===
North Carolina Senate 17th district general election, 2012
Party	Candidate	Votes	%
Republican	Tamara Barringer (incumbent)	57,101	53.67%
Democratic	Erv Portman	49,298	46.33%
Total votes		106,399	100%
Republican hold			

=== 2010 ===
North Carolina Senate 17th district general election, 2010
Party	Candidate	Votes	%
Republican	Richard Stevens (incumbent)	51,391	63.75%
Democratic	David Donovan	29,217	36.25%
Total votes		80,608	100%
Republican hold			

=== 2008 ===
North Carolina Senate 17th district general election, 2008
Party	Candidate	Votes	%
Republican	Richard Stevens (incumbent)	75,311	81.20%
Libertarian	Brian Irving	17,441	18.80%
Total votes		92,752	100%
Republican hold			

=== 2006 ===
North Carolina Senate 17th district general election, 2006
Party	Candidate	Votes	%
Republican	Richard Stevens (incumbent)	40,430	100%
Total votes		40,430	100%
Republican hold			

=== 2004 ===
North Carolina Senate 17th district general election, 2004
Party	Candidate	Votes	%
Republican	Richard Stevens (incumbent)	55,908	58.74%
Democratic	Norwood Clark	37,432	39.33%
Libertarian	Ryan Maas	1,844	1.94%
Total votes		95,184	100%
Republican hold			

=== 2002 ===
North Carolina Senate 17th district Republican primary election, 2002
Party	Candidate	Votes	%
Republican	Richard Stevens	6,213	69.53%
Republican	David S. Sharpe Jr.	2,723	30.47%
Total votes		8,936	100%

North Carolina Senate 17th district general election, 2002
Party	Candidate	Votes	%
Republican	Richard Stevens	37,076	61.69%
Democratic	Thomas B. Hunt	20,616	34.30%
Libertarian	Susan Hogarth	2,411	4.01%
Total votes		60,103	100%
Republican win (new seat)			

=== 2000 ===
North Carolina Senate 17th district Republican primary election, 2000
Party	Candidate	Votes	%
Republican	William P. "Bill" Davis	6,007	41.66%
Republican	Eddie Goodall	4,960	34.40%
Republican	Michael Concannon	3,452	23.94%
Total votes		14,419	100%

North Carolina Senate 17th district general election, 2000
Party	Candidate	Votes	%
Democratic	Aaron Plyler (incumbent)	57,678	27.84%
Democratic	Bill Purcell (incumbent)	51,316	24.77%
Republican	William P. "Bill" Davis	48,350	23.33%
Republican	Eddie Goodall	47,427	22.89%
Libertarian	Alan Light	2,438	1.18%
Total votes		207,209	100%
Democratic hold			
Democratic hold			
