= Robert Pittenger =

American politician (born 1948)

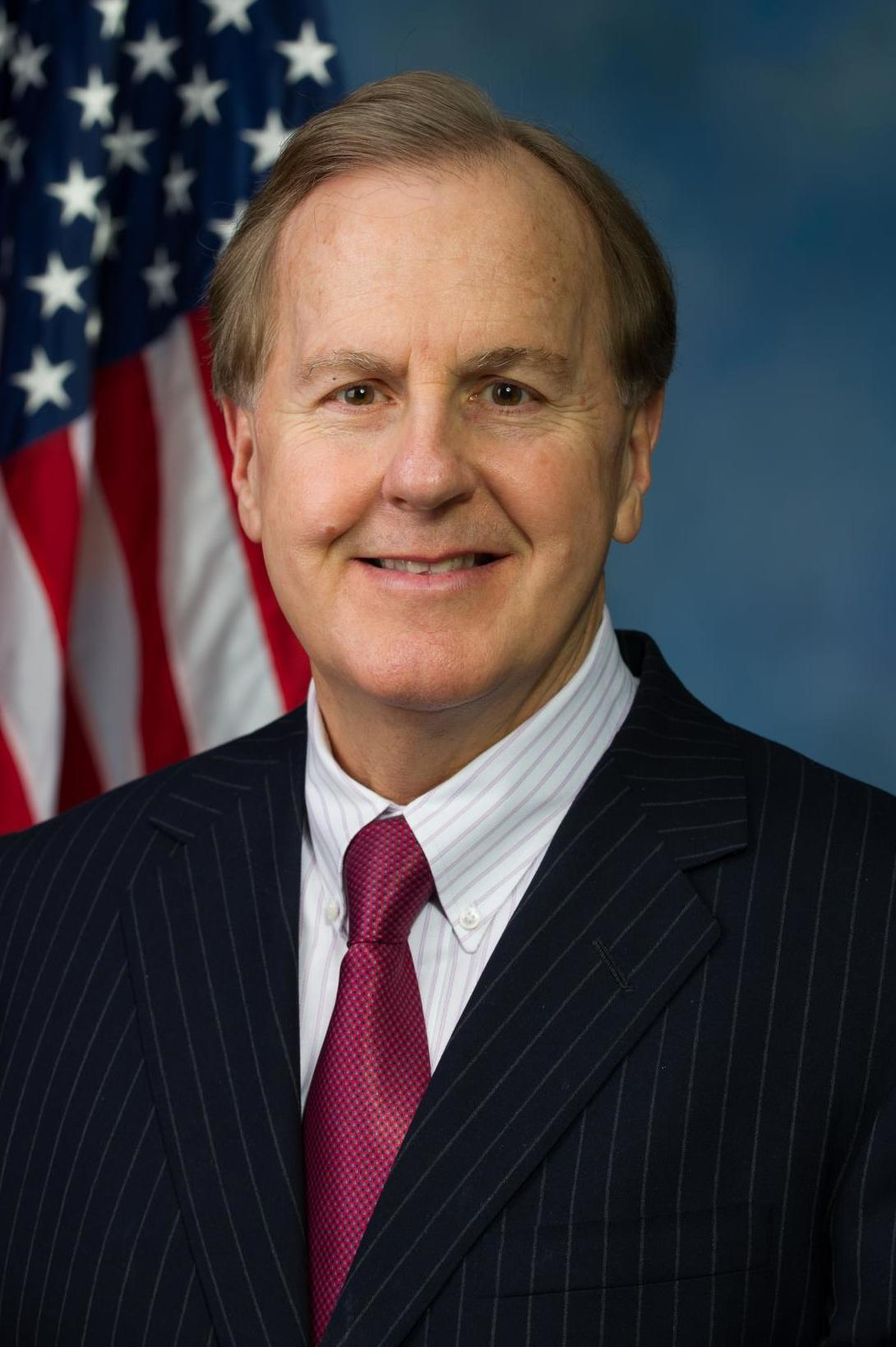
- Official portrait, 2012

Member of the U.S. House of Representatives from North Carolina's 9th district
- In office January 3, 2013 – January 3, 2019
- Preceded by: Sue Myrick
- Succeeded by: Dan Bishop

Member of the North Carolina Senate
- In office January 1, 2003 – May 27, 2008
- Preceded by: Fountain Odom (40th, redistricted); Bob Rucho (39th)
- Succeeded by: Bob Rucho
- Constituency: 40th district (2003–2005); 39th district (2005–2008)

Personal details
- Born: Robert Miller Pittenger; August 15, 1948 (age 78) Dallas, Texas, U.S.
- Party: Republican
- Spouse: Suzanne Bahakel (m. 1978)
- Children: 4
- Education: University of Texas, Austin (BA)

Robert Miller Pittenger (/ˈpɪtəndʒər/; born August 15, 1948) is a businessman and American politician who was the U.S. representative for North Carolina's 9th congressional district from 2013 to 2019. The district included several outer portions of Charlotte as well as many of that city's southern and eastern suburbs. He is a member of the Republican Party.

== Early life, education, and business career ==
Pittenger was born in Texas and attended the University of Texas. After graduating he worked for Campus Crusade for Christ before moving to Charlotte in 1985 and becoming a real estate investor.

== North Carolina Senate (2003–2007) ==
=== Elections ===
After redistricting, Pittenger decided to run for the 40th senate district of the North Carolina General Assembly in 2002. He defeated Democratic State Senator Fountain Odom 55%–43%. In 2004 he ran for the 39th senate district and defeated Libertarian nominee Andy Grum 89%–11%. In 2006, he won reelection to a third term unopposed.

=== Tenure ===
Pittenger represented the state's 39th Senate district, which included portions of southeastern Mecklenburg County. He was a lead sponsor of Right To Life legislation and supported the North Carolina marriage amendment, although he was not in office when the amendment passed out of committee and was finally voted on by the North Carolina General Assembly in 2011.

In May 2004, he proposed cutting the state's corporate tax from 6.9% to 4.9% and the income tax rate for the state's top earners from 8.25% to 7.5%. He also proposed over $1.5 billion in spending cuts, with a focus on reducing Medicaid access for persons above the age of Medicare eligibility.

In February 2005, he proposed a medical malpractice bill that would cap non-economic damages at $250,000 for physicians, hospitals, and long-term care facilities.

=== Committee assignments ===
- Appropriations/Base Budget
- Commerce
- Finance
- Insurance and Civil Justice Reform
- Pensions & Retirement and Aging
- Rules and Operation

== 2008 lieutenant gubernatorial bid ==
Pittenger defeated three other candidates in the Republican primary on May 6, 2008, becoming his party's nominee for Lieutenant Governor of North Carolina with 59% of the vote. On May 27, 2008, he resigned from the Senate to focus on his campaign. He lost the general election to Democratic State Senator Walter Dalton, 51%–46%.

== U.S. House of Representatives (2013–2019) ==
=== Elections ===
2012

After Sue Myrick announced her retirement as the Representative of North Carolina's 9th congressional district in early 2012, Pittenger announced that he would run to replace her. He failed to win the primary outright on May 8, 2012, but finished first with 32% of the vote in the 11-candidate field. In the primary runoff election held on July 17, he defeated former Mecklenburg County Sheriff Jim Pendergraph, 53%–47%.

Pittenger won the general election on November 6, defeating Democratic Mecklenburg County Commission Chairwoman Jennifer Roberts, 52%–47%. He lost the district's share of Mecklenburg County (47%), but ran up huge margins in the Union (63%) and Iredell (64%) portions of the district. It was the closest a Republican had come to losing the district since 1986. He took office in January 2013.

On December 2, 2013, Pittenger introduced the Kilah Davenport Child Protection Act of 2013, which became Pub. L. 113–104 (text) (PDF). The law broadens the coverage of current laws that address domestic assaults by certain repeat offenders. It also requires the United States Department of Justice to write a report on child abuse prevention laws in all U.S. states and territories, "with a particular focus on penalties for cases of severe child abuse."

2014

Pittenger considered running for the U.S. Senate but instead ran for reelection to the House. In the Republican primary, he defeated Michael Steinberg, a candidate for the seat in 2012. No Democrat filed to run for the seat, making this district the only one in the state not contested by both major parties in 2014. There was an unsuccessful write-in campaign for candidate Shawn Eckles of Iredell County.

2016

The 9th was significantly redrawn after a federal court threw out the previous map as an unconstitutional racial gerrymander. It was pushed well to the east, stretching from southeast Charlotte all the way to Fayetteville and the Sandhills.

Baptist pastor Mark Harris challenged Pittenger in the 2016 Republican congressional primary, losing that contest by 134 votes. Pittenger defeated Christian Cano in the general election.

2018

Pittenger faced Mark Harris in a rematch of the 2016 Republican primary. On May 8, 2018, Harris defeated Pittenger with 48.5 percent of the vote to Pittenger's 46.2 percent, although allegations were later raised about illegal activities by the Harris campaign. Pittenger was the first congressional incumbent to lose his primary election in 2018; the second was Mark Sanford.

Harris was the apparent winner in the November 2018 general election, but the result was not certified due to credible allegations of electoral fraud and he was never seated in Congress. As a result, a new special election was called. Pittenger (and also Harris) declined to run in the special election.

=== Committee assignments ===
- Committee on Financial Services
  - Subcommittee on Financial Institutions and Consumer Credit
  - Subcommittee on Monetary Policy and Trade
- Republican Study Committee

=== Caucus memberships ===
- United States Congressional International Conservation Caucus
- U.S.-Japan Caucus

== Political positions ==
The American Conservative Union gave him a lifetime Congressional evaluation of 90%.

=== Environment ===
Pittenger rejects the scientific consensus on climate change. In 2006, he sent a book called The Skeptical Environmentalist, published in 1998, to his colleagues in the North Carolina Senate.

=== Health care ===
Pittenger supported the American Health Care Act of 2017 (AHCA), which would repeal the Patient Protection and Affordable Care Act (ACA), also known as Obamacare. On May 2, 2017, Pittenger defended a provision of AHCA that allowed states to end requirements that insurers cannot discriminate against individuals with pre-existing conditions. Pittenger said that Americans who have or develop pre-existing conditions "should just move" to a state without the waiver.

=== National defense ===
Pittenger voted for the two-year budget plan that became law on February 9, 2018, citing the lack of options to increase military spending to provide for required training and maintenance.

== Controversies ==
=== Conflict of interest ===
Pittenger has been accused of using his position as a state senator to benefit himself in a series of land deals.

=== Racist remarks ===
On September 22, 2016, in the wake of protests over the shooting of Keith Lamont Scott, Pittenger said that the violence in Charlotte stemmed from protesters who "hate white people because white people are successful and they're not." The remark drew immediate international condemnation as racist. Fellow North Carolina congressman G. K. Butterfield called the remark "devastatingly ignorant and divisive." Pittenger apologized, saying that his "intent was to discuss the lack of economic mobility for African Americans because of failed policies."

== Electoral history ==
Republican primary results
Party	Candidate	Votes	%
Republican	Robert Pittenger	29,999	32.4
Republican	Jim Pendergraph	23,401	25.3
Republican	Edwin B. Peacock III	11,336	12.3
Republican	Ric Killian	9,691	10.5
Republican	Dan Barry	5,515	6.0
Republican	Andy Dulin	4,526	4.9
Republican	Mike Steinberg	2,297	2.5
Republican	Jon Gauthier	2,056	2.2
Republican	Ken Leonczyk	2,047	2.2
Republican	Richard Lynch	1,000	1.1
Republican	Michael Shaffer (withdrew)	579	0.6
Total votes		92,447	100.0

Republican primary runoff results
Party	Candidate	Votes	%
Republican	Robert Pittenger	18,982	52.9
Republican	Jim Pendergraph	16,902	47.1
Total votes		35,884	100.0

North Carolina's 9th congressional district, 2012
Party	Candidate	Votes	%
Republican	Robert Pittenger	194,537	51.8
Democratic	Jennifer Roberts	171,503	45.6
Libertarian	Curtis Campbell	9,650	2.6
Total votes		375,690	100.0
Republican hold			

Republican primary results
Party	Candidate	Votes	%
Republican	Robert Pittenger (incumbent)	29,505	67.6
Republican	Michael Steinberg	14,146	32.4
Total votes		43,651	100.0

North Carolina's 9th congressional district, 2014
Party	Candidate	Votes	%
Republican	Robert Pittenger (incumbent)	163,080	93.9
n/a	Write-ins	8,219	4.7
Independent	Shawn Eckles (write-in)	2,369	1.4
Total votes		173,668	100.0
Republican hold			

Republican primary results
Party	Candidate	Votes	%
Republican	Robert Pittenger (incumbent)	9,299	35.0
Republican	Mark Harris	9,165	34.4
Republican	Todd Johnson	8,142	30.6
Total votes		26,606	100.0

North Carolina's 9th congressional district, 2016
Party	Candidate	Votes	%
Republican	Robert Pittenger (incumbent)	193,452	58.2
Democratic	Christian Cano	139,041	41.8
Total votes		332,493	100.0
Republican hold			

Republican primary results
Party	Candidate	Votes	%
Republican	Mark Harris	17,302	48.5
Republican	Robert Pittenger (incumbent)	16,474	46.2
Republican	Clarence Goins	1,867	5.2
Total votes		35,643	100.0

== Personal life ==
Pittenger lives in South Charlotte. He is married to Suzanne Pittenger. He has four children.

Party political offices
Preceded by James Snyder	Republican nominee for Lieutenant Governor of North Carolina; 2008	Succeeded by Dan Forest
U.S. House of Representatives
Preceded by Sue Myrick	Member of the U.S. House of Representatives from North Carolina's 9th congressional district 2013–2019	Succeeded by Dan Bishop
U.S. order of precedence (ceremonial)
Preceded by Mark Meadows as Former U.S. Representative	Order of precedence of the United States as Former U.S. Representative	Succeeded by Mark Walker as Former U.S. Representative
