= Todd Johnson (politician) =

American politician

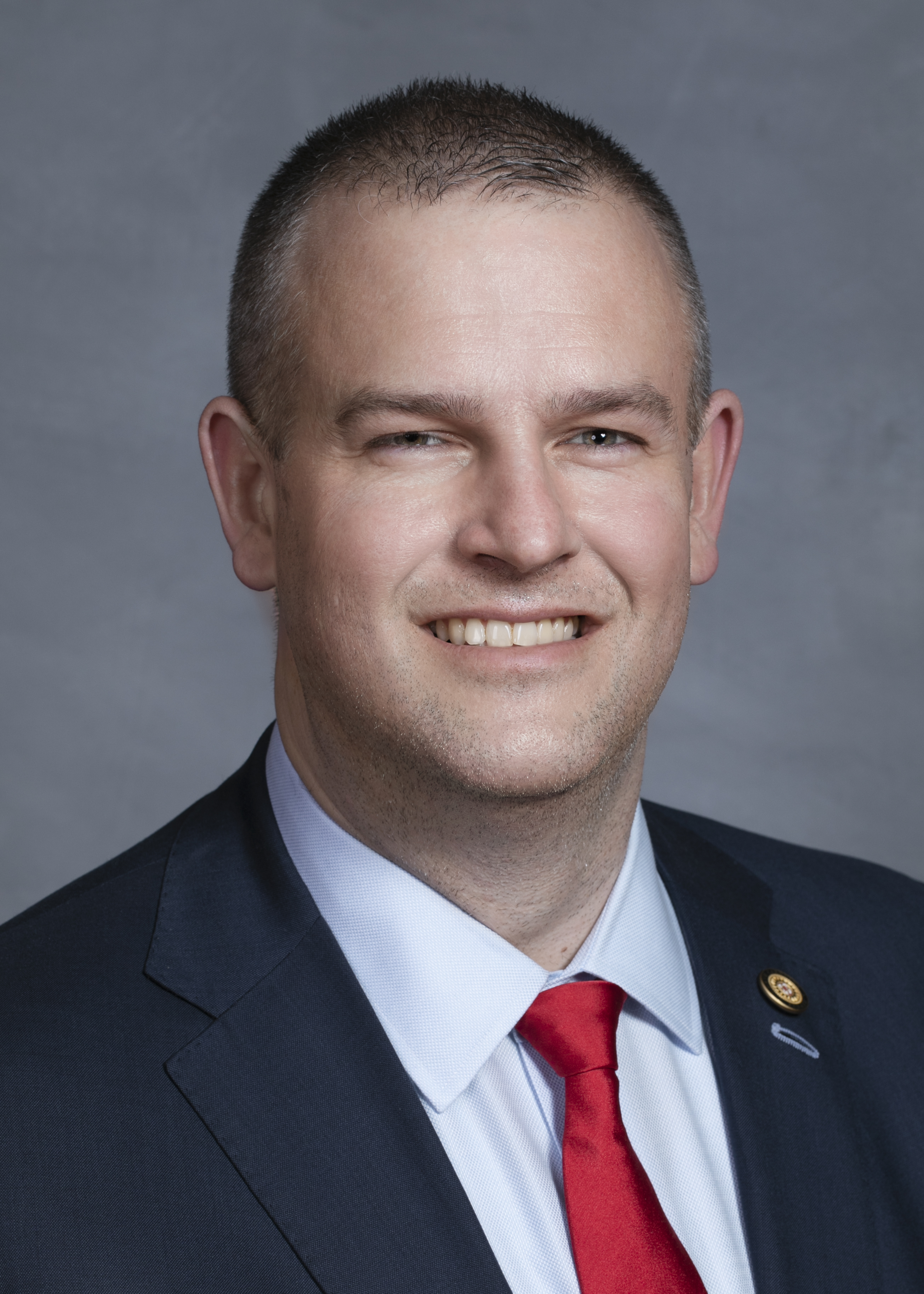

Member of the North Carolina Senate from the 35th district
- Incumbent
- Assumed office January 1, 2019
- Preceded by: Tommy Tucker

Personal details
- Born: 1978 or 1979 (age 47–48)
- Party: Republican
- Spouse: Amanda
- Children: two
- Education: University of North Carolina at Chapel Hill
- Occupation: insurance agent

Todd Johnson (born c. 1979) is an American politician from the state of North Carolina. He is a member of the North Carolina Senate from the Republican party, representing the 35th district. He was first elected in November 2018. Johnson is an insurance agent and former commissioner in Union County, North Carolina.

North Carolina Senate
Preceded by Tommy Tucker	Member of the North Carolina Senate from the 35th district 2019-Present	Incumbent
