= Kilah Davenport Child Protection Act of 2013 =

Child Protection Act

- Long title: To require the Attorney General to report on State law penalties for certain child abusers, and for other purposes.
- Announced in: the 113th United States Congress
- Sponsored by: Rep. Robert Pittenger (R, NC-9)
- Number of co-sponsors: 0

Citations
- Public law: Pub. L. 113–104 (text) (PDF)

Codification
- U.S.C. sections affected: 18 U.S.C. § 117
- Agencies affected: United States Department of Justice

Legislative history
- Introduced in the House as H.R. 3627 by Rep. Robert Pittenger (R, NC-9) on December 2, 2013; Committee consideration by House Judiciary; Passed the House on December 9, 2013 (voice vote); Passed the Senate on May 12, 2014 (unanimous consent); Signed into law by President Barack Obama on May 20, 2014

The Kilah Davenport Child Protection Act of 2013 (H.R. 3627; Pub. L. 113–104 (text) (PDF)) is a law that broadens the coverage of current laws that address domestic assaults by certain repeat offenders. The law also requires the United States Department of Justice to write a report on child abuse prevention laws in all U.S. states and territories, "with a particular focus on penalties for cases of severe child abuse."

The bill was signed into law on May 20, 2014, by President Barack Obama, becoming Pub. L. 113–104 (text) (PDF).

== Background ==
Kilah Davenport was a little girl who was abused by her stepfather. She was badly beaten in 2012 at age three, suffered severe brain damage, and never recovered, dying in March 2014.

== Provisions of the bill ==
This summary is based largely on the summary provided by the Congressional Research Service, a public domain source.

The Kilah Davenport Child Protection Act of 2013 directs the Attorney General to report every three years to the congressional judiciary committees on the penalties for violations of laws prohibiting child abuse in each of the 50 states, the District of Columbia, and each U.S. territory, including whether the laws of that jurisdiction provide for enhanced penalties when the victim has suffered serious bodily injury or permanent or protracted loss or impairment of any mental or emotional function.

The bill amends the federal criminal code to apply certain increased criminal penalties against any person who commits domestic assault and who has a final conviction on at least two separate prior occasions under state, federal, or tribal court proceedings (a habitual offender) for offenses that would be, if subject to federal jurisdiction, assault, sexual abuse, or a serious violent felony against a spouse or intimate partner (as under current law) or against a child of, or in the care of, the person committing the domestic assault.

== Congressional Budget Office report ==
This summary is based largely on the summary provided by the Congressional Budget Office, as ordered reported by the House Committee on the Judiciary on December 4, 2013. This is a public domain source.

The Congressional Budget Office (CBO) estimates that implementing H.R. 3627 would have no significant cost to the federal government. Enacting the bill could affect direct spending and revenues; therefore, pay-as-you-go procedures apply. However, the CBO estimates that any effects would be insignificant.

H.R. 3627 would broaden the coverage of current laws that address domestic assaults by certain repeat offenders. As a result, the government might be able to pursue cases that it otherwise would not be able to prosecute. The CBO expects that the bill would apply to a relatively small number of offenders, however, so any increase in costs for law enforcement, court proceedings, or prison operations would not be significant. Any such costs would be subject to the availability of appropriated funds.

Because those prosecuted and convicted under H.R. 3627 could be subject to criminal fines, the federal government might collect additional fines if the legislation is enacted. Criminal fines are recorded as revenues, deposited in the Crime Victims Fund, and later spent. The CBO expects that any additional revenues and direct spending would not be significant because of the small number of cases likely to be affected.

H.R. 3627 also would require the Department of Justice (DOJ) to prepare a report, within 180 days of the bill’s enactment and again three years after enactment, on the penalties for child abuse in states, the District of Columbia, and U.S. territories. Based on the costs of similar activities currently carried out by DOJ, CBO estimates that implementing H.R. 3627 would not have a significant effect on spending by the department.

H.R. 3627 contains no intergovernmental or private-sector mandates as defined in the Unfunded Mandates Reform Act and would not affect the budgets of state, local, or tribal governments.

== Procedural history ==
The Kilah Davenport Child Protection Act of 2013 was introduced into the United States House of Representatives on December 2, 2013 by Rep. Robert Pittenger (R, NC-9). The bill was referred to the United States House Committee on the Judiciary. It was reported alongside House Report 113-286. The House voted on December 9, 2013 to pass the bill in a voice vote. On May 7, 2014, the United States Senate voted to pass the bill by unanimous consent. It was signed into law on May 20, 2014, by President Barack Obama, becoming Pub. L. 113–104 (text) (PDF).

== Debate and discussion ==
Rep. Pittenger, who sponsored the bill, said that the bill "will strengthen laws and help prevent child abuse," noting that "it is sickening to realize that we need such laws." After the bill's passage, Pittenger called it "a victory on behalf of children," but said that "no happy, bright, little girl should ever become the face of child abuse legislation."

Kilah Davenport's family supported the legislation. Kirbi Davenport, Kilah's mother, said that "everyone is so excited that we were able to do this in Kilah's honor but also for the other children in the United States that we will be saving."

== See also ==
- List of bills in the 113th United States Congress
- Child abuse
