= Bob Atwater =

American politician

Member of the North Carolina Senate from the 18th district
- In office January 1, 2005 – January 1, 2013
- Preceded by: Ralph Hunt
- Succeeded by: Eleanor Kinnaird (redistricting)

Personal details
- Born: Robert Atwater
- Party: Democratic
- Profession: Politician

Robert "Bob" Atwater is an American politician who served in the North Carolina Senate from 2005 to 2013, representing the 18th legislative district of North Carolina as a Democrat.

== Career ==
Atwater served in the North Carolina Senate from 2005 to 2013, representing the 18th legislative district of North Carolina as a Democrat.

Atwater defeated Republican nominee Roger Gerber with 69% of the vote in the 2008 general election.

Atwater ran unopposed in the 2010 Democratic primary. In the subsequent general election, Atwater defeated Gerber in a rematch with 59% of the vote.

== Political positions ==
Atwater received a rating of 100 from the North Carolina Housing Coalition in 2007. He received 100% ratings from North Carolina Voters for Clean Elections and Planned Parenthood in 2010 and 2011 respectively. Additionally, Atwater received a B rating from the NRA Political Victory Fund in 2010.

== Electoral history ==
=== 2010 ===
North Carolina Senate 18th district general election, 2010
Party	Candidate	Votes	%
Democratic	Bob Atwater (incumbent)	38,809	59.43%
Republican	Roger Gerber	26,488	40.57%
Total votes		65,297	100%
Democratic hold			

=== 2008 ===
North Carolina Senate 18th district general election, 2008
Party	Candidate	Votes	%
Democratic	Bob Atwater (incumbent)	66,916	69.00%
Republican	Roger Gerber	30,063	31.00%
Total votes		96,979	100%
Democratic hold			

=== 2006 ===
North Carolina Senate 18th district general election, 2006
Party	Candidate	Votes	%
Democratic	Bob Atwater (incumbent)	36,763	100%
Total votes		36,763	100%
Democratic hold			

=== 2004 ===
North Carolina Senate 18th district Democratic primary election, 2004
Party	Candidate	Votes	%
Democratic	Bob Atwater	9,244	52.19%
Democratic	Paul D. Carrington	6,605	37.29%
Democratic	Tommy "Jr." Griffin	1,862	10.51%
Total votes		17,711	100%

North Carolina Senate 18th district general election, 2004
Party	Candidate	Votes	%
Democratic	Bob Atwater	46,875	58.04%
Republican	Christine Mumma	32,709	40.50%
Libertarian	Jon Guze	1,186	1.47%
Total votes		80,770	100%
Democratic hold			

North Carolina Senate
Preceded by Ralph Hunt	Member of the North Carolina Senate from the 18th district 2005–2013	Succeeded by Chad Barefoot
