= 2020 North Carolina Attorney General election =

- November 3, 2020
- Turnout: 73.55% ▲
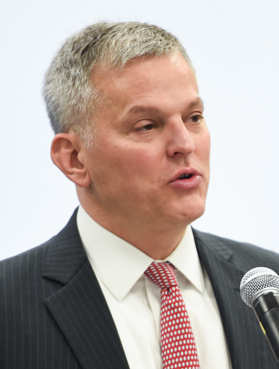

Nominee	Josh Stein	Jim O'Neill
Party	Democratic	Republican
Popular vote	2,713,400	2,699,778
Percentage	50.13%	49.87%
- Stein: 50-60% 60-70% 70-80% 80–90% >90% O'Neill: 50-60% 60-70% 70-80% 80–90% >90% Tie: 50%
Attorney General before election
Josh Stein
Democratic
Elected Attorney General
Josh Stein
Democratic

The 2020 North Carolina election for Attorney General was held on November 3, 2020, to elect the Attorney General of North Carolina, concurrently with the 2020 U.S. presidential election, as well as elections to the United States Senate and elections to the United States House of Representatives and various state and local elections.

Party primary elections were held on March 3, 2020.

Incumbent Democratic Attorney General Josh Stein, first elected in 2016, ran for re-election against Republican Forsyth County District Attorney Jim O'Neill. With a narrow margin separating Stein and O'Neill (0.26%), the Associated Press was finally able to call Stein the winner on November 17, 2020, (two weeks after Election Day). This also made this attorney general race the closest of the 2020 election cycle.

== Democratic primary ==
=== Candidates ===
==== Nominee ====
- Josh Stein, incumbent attorney general

== Republican primary ==
=== Candidates ===
==== Nominee ====
- Jim O'Neill, Forsyth County district attorney and candidate for North Carolina Attorney General in 2016

==== Eliminated in primary ====
- Sam Hayes, general counsel for the North Carolina State Treasurer Dale Folwell
- Christine Mumma, executive director of the North Carolina Center on Actual Innocence

=== Results ===
Results by county O'Neill: 30–40%; 40–50%; 50–60%; 60–70%; 70–80%; Hayes: 30–40%; 40–50%; 50–60%; Mumma: 30–40%; 40–50%

Republican primary results
Party	Candidate	Votes	%
Republican	Jim O'Neill	338,567	46.55%
Republican	Sam Hayes	226,453	31.14%
Republican	Christine Mumma	162,301	22.31%
Total votes		727,321	100.00%

== General election ==
=== Predictions ===
Source	Ranking	As of
The Cook Political Report	Lean D	June 25, 2020

=== Polling ===
View source data.

Poll source	Date(s) administered	Sample size	Margin of error	Josh Stein (D)	Jim O'Neill (R)	Other	Undecided
East Carolina University	October 27–28, 2020	1,103 (LV)	± 3.4%	49%	42%	3% (Note: Did/would not vote with 3%)	6%
Meeting Street Insights (R)	October 24–27, 2020	600 (LV)	± 4%	49%	44%	–	4%
East Carolina University	October 15–18, 2020	1,155 (LV)	± 3.4%	49%	44%	2% (Note: Would/did not vote with 2%)	5%
East Carolina University	October 2–4, 2020	1,232 (LV)	± 3.2%	43%	46%	2% (Note: Would not vote with 2%)	9%
Cardinal Point Analytics (R)	July 22–24, 2020	735 (LV)	± 3.6%	40%	45%	–	15%
Cardinal Point Analytics (R)	July 13–15, 2020	547 (LV)	± 4.2%	43%	43%	–	14%

=== Results ===
North Carolina Attorney General election, 2020
Party	Candidate	Votes	%	±%
Democratic	Josh Stein (incumbent)	2,713,400	50.13%	−0.14%
Republican	Jim O'Neill	2,699,778	49.87%	+0.14%
Total votes		5,413,178	100.00%	N/A
Democratic hold				

==== By congressional district ====
Despite losing the state, O'Neill won eight of 13 congressional districts.

District	Stein	O'Neill	Representative
1st	56%	44%	G. K. Butterfield
2nd	65%	35%	George Holding
2nd	65%	35%	Deborah K. Ross
3rd	39%	61%	Greg Murphy
4th	67%	33%	David Price
5th	34%	66%	Virginia Foxx
6th	62%	38%	Mark Walker
6th	62%	38%	Kathy Manning
7th	43%	57%	David Rouzer
8th	48%	52%	Richard Hudson
9th	46%	54%	Dan Bishop
10th	33%	67%	Patrick McHenry
11th	45%	55%	Madison Cawthorn
12th	70%	30%	Alma Adams
13th	34%	66%	Ted Budd
