= Josh Stein =

Governor of North Carolina since 2025

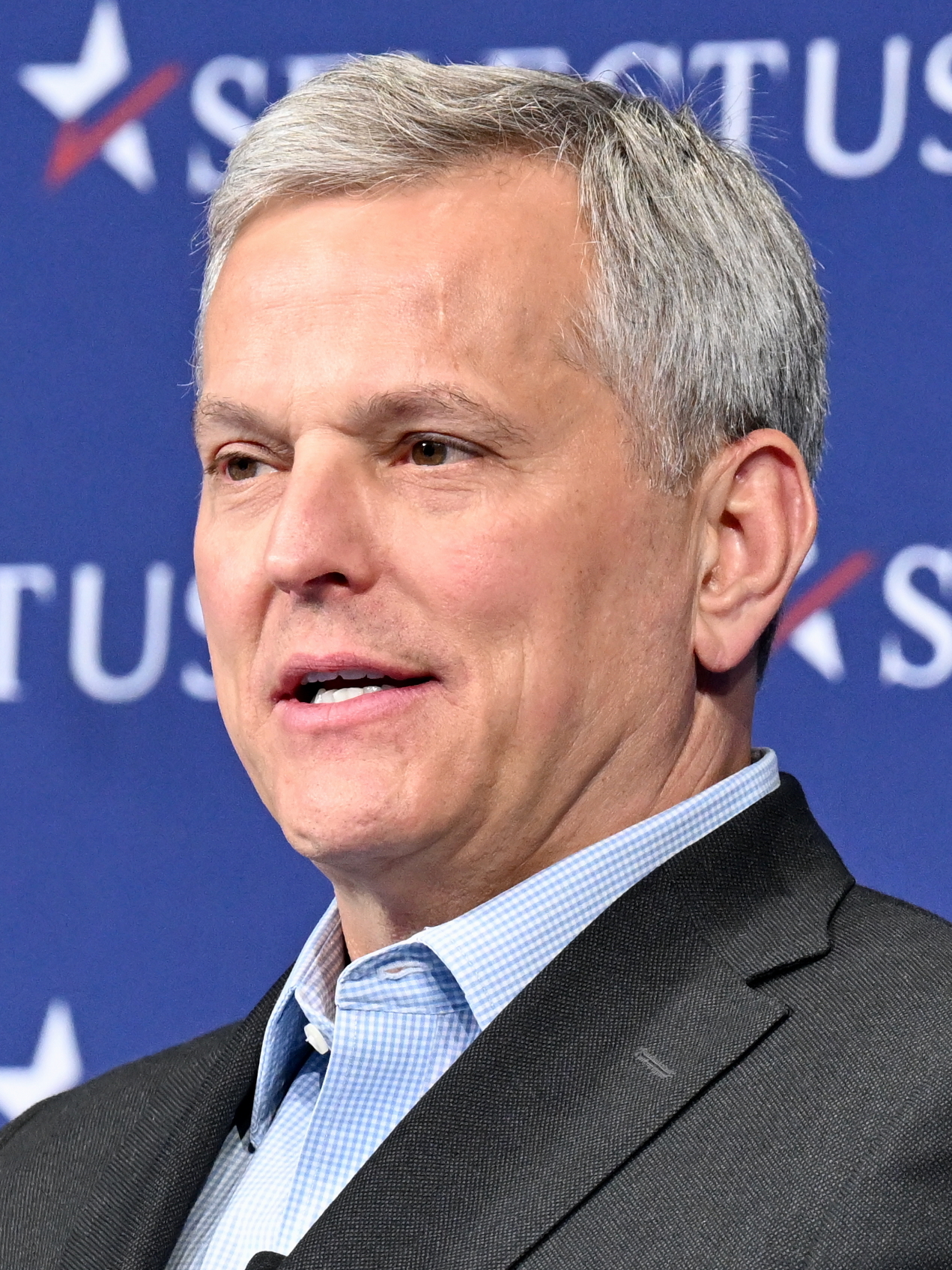
- Stein in 2026

76th Governor of North Carolina
- Incumbent
- Assumed office January 1, 2025
- Lieutenant: Rachel Hunt
- Preceded by: Roy Cooper

51st Attorney General of North Carolina
- In office January 1, 2017 – January 1, 2025
- Governor: Roy Cooper
- Preceded by: Roy Cooper
- Succeeded by: Jeff Jackson

Member of the North Carolina Senate from the 16th district
- In office January 1, 2009 – March 21, 2016
- Preceded by: Janet Cowell
- Succeeded by: Jay Chaudhuri

Personal details
- Born: Joshua Harold Stein; September 13, 1966 (age 60) Washington, D.C., U.S.
- Party: Democratic
- Spouse: Anna Harris
- Children: 3
- Education: Dartmouth College (BA); Harvard University (MPP, JD)
- Website: Campaign website

Joshua Harold Stein (born September 13, 1966) is an American politician and lawyer serving as the 76th governor of North Carolina since 2025. A member of the Democratic Party, Stein served as the 51st attorney general of North Carolina from 2017 to 2025 and in the North Carolina Senate from 2009 to 2016, representing the 16th Senate district.

Stein won the Democratic nomination in the 2016 North Carolina Attorney General election, in which he defeated Republican nominee Buck Newton by 0.54 points. He was reelected in 2020, narrowly defeating Republican nominee Jim O'Neill by 0.26 points.

Stein chose not to seek a third term and instead ran for governor in the 2024 election. After winning the Democratic nomination, he defeated Republican nominee Mark Robinson in the general election by 14.82 percentage points. He is North Carolina's first Jewish governor.

== Early life and education ==
Stein was born on September 13, 1966, in Washington, D.C., the son of Jane (Stoneman) and Adam Stein, of Jewish descent. At an early age, his family moved to Charlotte, North Carolina, before settling in Chapel Hill, where his father co-founded North Carolina's first integrated law firm.

Stein attended Chapel Hill High School and played on its state championship soccer team. After graduating, he earned his Bachelor of Arts degree in history from Dartmouth College in 1988. After college, he taught English and economics in Zimbabwe. Stein went on to earn degrees from Harvard Law School and the Kennedy School of Government.

== Early career ==
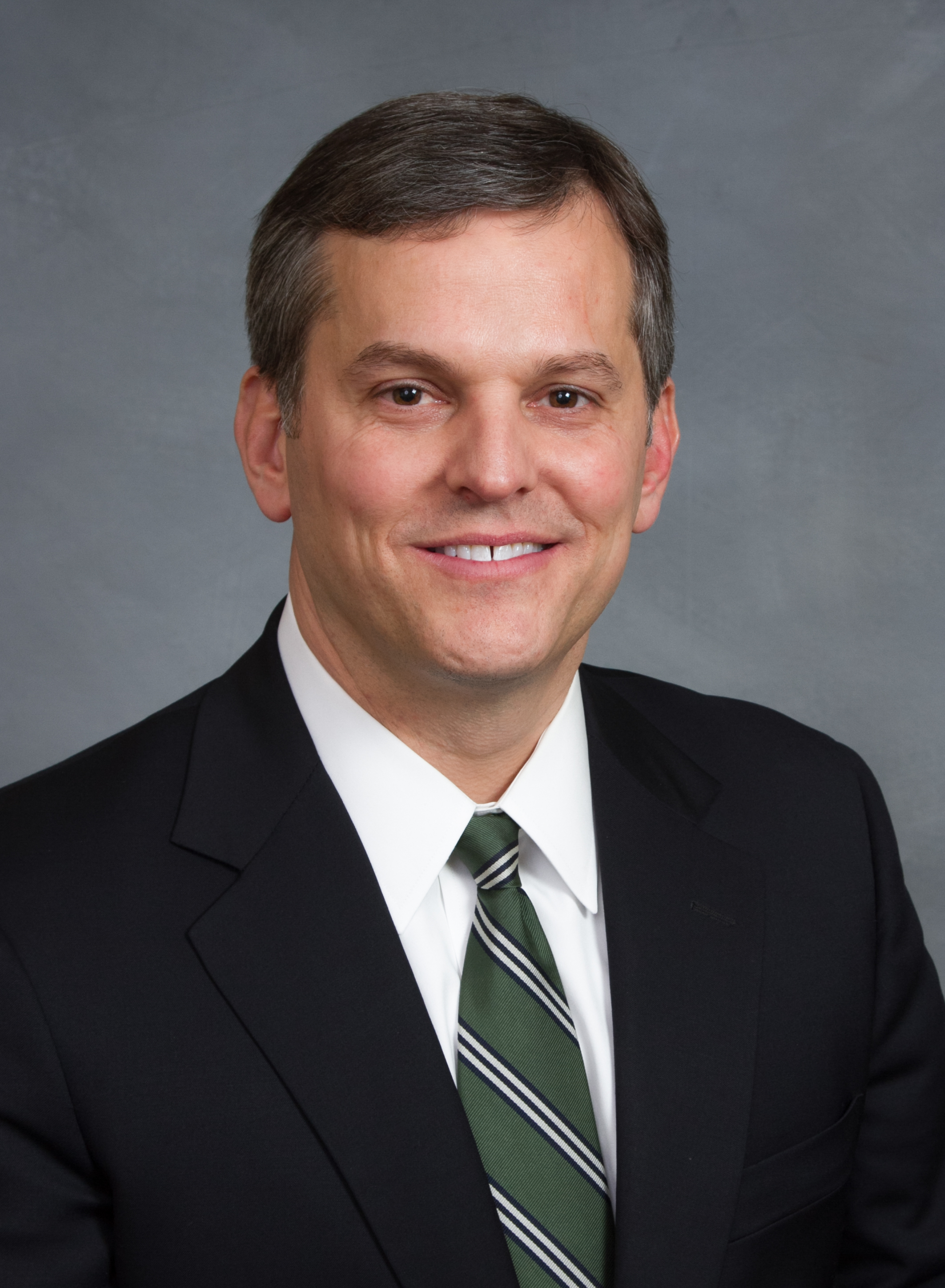
Stein during his tenure as a state senator, 2013

In the 1990s, Stein worked as an intern for State Representative Dan Blue. Out of law school, Stein worked for the Self-Help Credit Union and the North Carolina Minority Support Center. After managing John Edwards's 1998 U.S. Senate campaign, he served as Edwards's deputy chief of staff from January 1999 to December 2000. According to Edwards official Andrew Young, Elizabeth Edwards prevented her husband from naming Stein his chief of staff in the Senate because he withheld information from her at John's direction.

In 2001, North Carolina Attorney General Roy Cooper appointed Stein as senior deputy attorney general for consumer protection. He held that position until his election to the State Senate in 2008. From 2012 until 2016, he served as of counsel at Smith Moore Leatherwood, a regional law firm.

Stein defeated Republican John Alexander to represent the 16th district in the North Carolina Senate in 2008. After being reelected in 2010, he was elected minority whip by his colleagues.

In the Senate, Stein worked to expand the state's DNA database, ban cyberstalking, extend and expand the state's renewable energy tax credit, and improve school safety.

== North Carolina attorney general ==
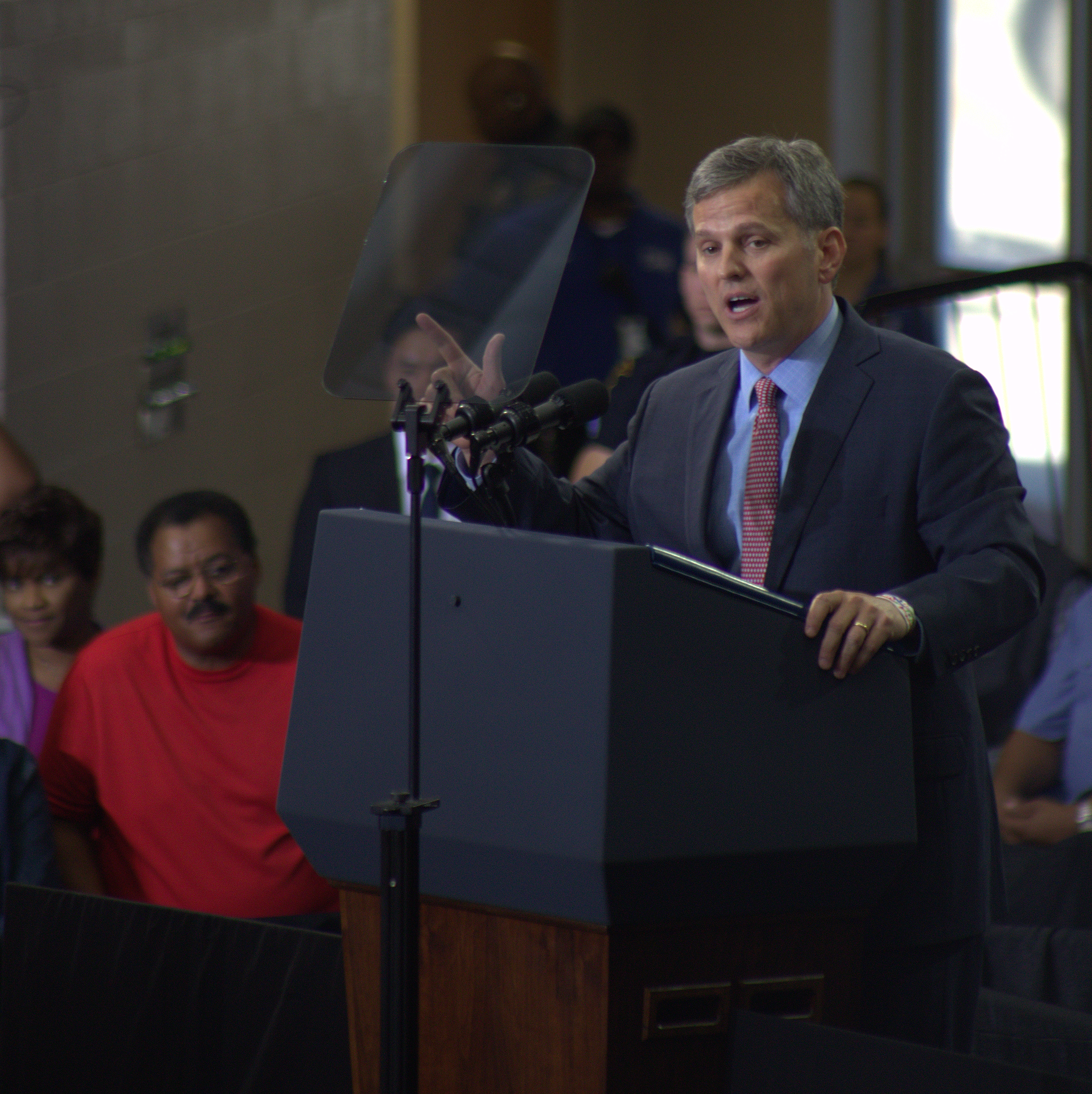
Stein speaks at a Fayetteville campaign rally, 2016

In 2016, Stein became the first Jewish person to win a statewide election in North Carolina. As attorney general, he worked to eliminate North Carolina's backlog of untested sexual assault kits, the nation's largest. This led to arrests in cases involving a 2015 assault and attempted murder in Durham, North Carolina; assaults in 2009 and 2010 in Fayetteville; and a 1993 assault in Winston-Salem.

Stein led the bipartisan effort of state attorneys general to negotiate a national settlement framework with drug companies—manufacturers, distributors, and pharmacy chains—over the nation's opioid epidemic, totaling more than $50 billion. North Carolina's share of the settlement was $1.5 billion. Stein negotiated a memorandum of agreement with the state's counties that ensured the vast majority of the funds would go to prevention, harm reduction, treatment or recovery. Johns Hopkins School of Public Health recognized this partnership as one of the best in the nation.

In 2018, Stein filed a brief with the United States Supreme Court arguing in favor of the Affordable Care Act. In 2019, he became the country's first attorney general to sue e-cigarette manufacturer Juul for unlawful marketing to minors. Stein won multiple settlements with Juul totaling nearly $48 million, setting a standard the rest of the nation followed.

Stein filed briefs supporting medication abortions and opposing restrictions on women from traveling to receive healthcare. He opposed the state's 12-week abortion ban enacted in 2023.

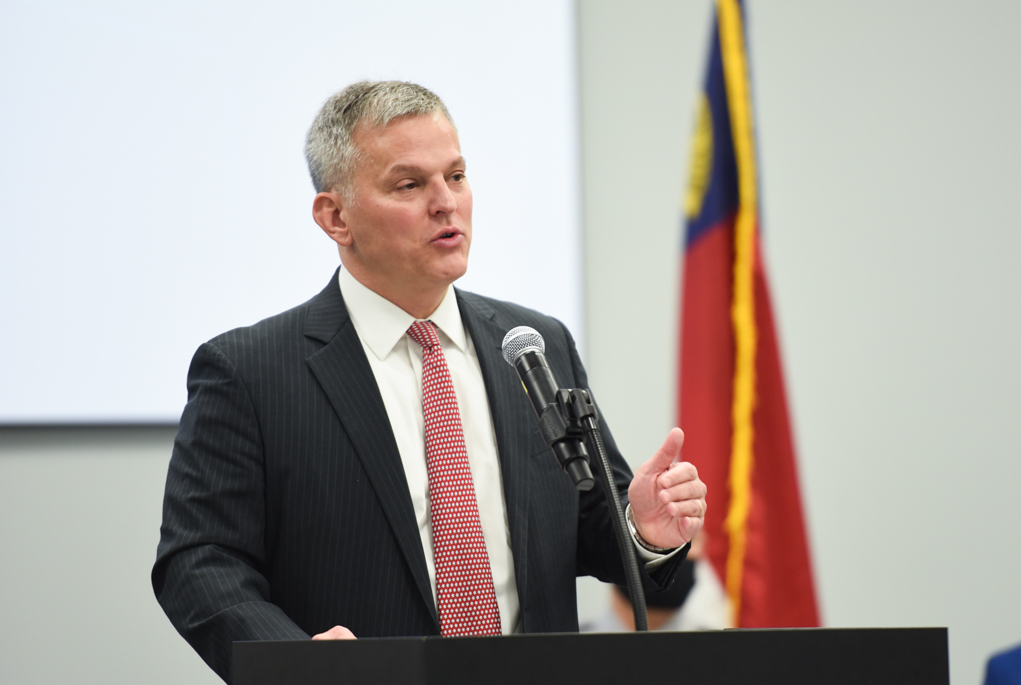
Stein speaks at a department of motor vehicle license and theft event, 2021

Stein negotiated eight Anti-Robocall Principles with a bipartisan coalition of 51 attorneys general and 12 companies to protect phone users from illegal robocalls. He also launched Operation Silver Shield, an effort to protect older North Carolinians from fraud and scams.

After the COVID-19 pandemic began, Stein won a preliminary injunction against a Charlotte tow company sued for price-gouging and announced the investigation of nine North Carolina–based sellers on Amazon accused of raising prices on coronavirus-related products, including hand sanitizer and N95 masks. Stein won more than $1 million in price-gouging cases.

On August 21, 2021, the legislature voted to remove Stein as its legal representation before the courts after he refused to appeal the findings of a lower court that a North Carolina state law that disenfranchised anyone convicted of a felony was unconstitutional. Stein said he had been waiting for the ruling to be formally filed. Legislative leaders alleged Stein was "slow-walking" the case to allow felons to vote in the next election.

== Governor of North Carolina ==
=== Election ===
Map of the 2024 North Carolina gubernatorial election results.

On January 18, 2023, Stein announced his candidacy for governor of North Carolina in the 2024 election. He was endorsed by Governor Roy Cooper and hundreds of other elected officials and organizations.

On Super Tuesday, Stein advanced to the general election and faced Republican lieutenant governor Mark Robinson. Beginning in the summer, Stein consistently led in polling, and after a CNN report on inflammatory and antisemitic comments Robinson had made on a pornography forum, Stein became the heavy favorite.

Stein won the election by a margin of 14.8%, even as Republican Donald Trump defeated Democrat Kamala Harris by 3.2% in the concurrent 2024 presidential election in North Carolina. Stein had previously won statewide by only 0.54% in 2016 and 0.26% in 2020.

=== Tenure ===
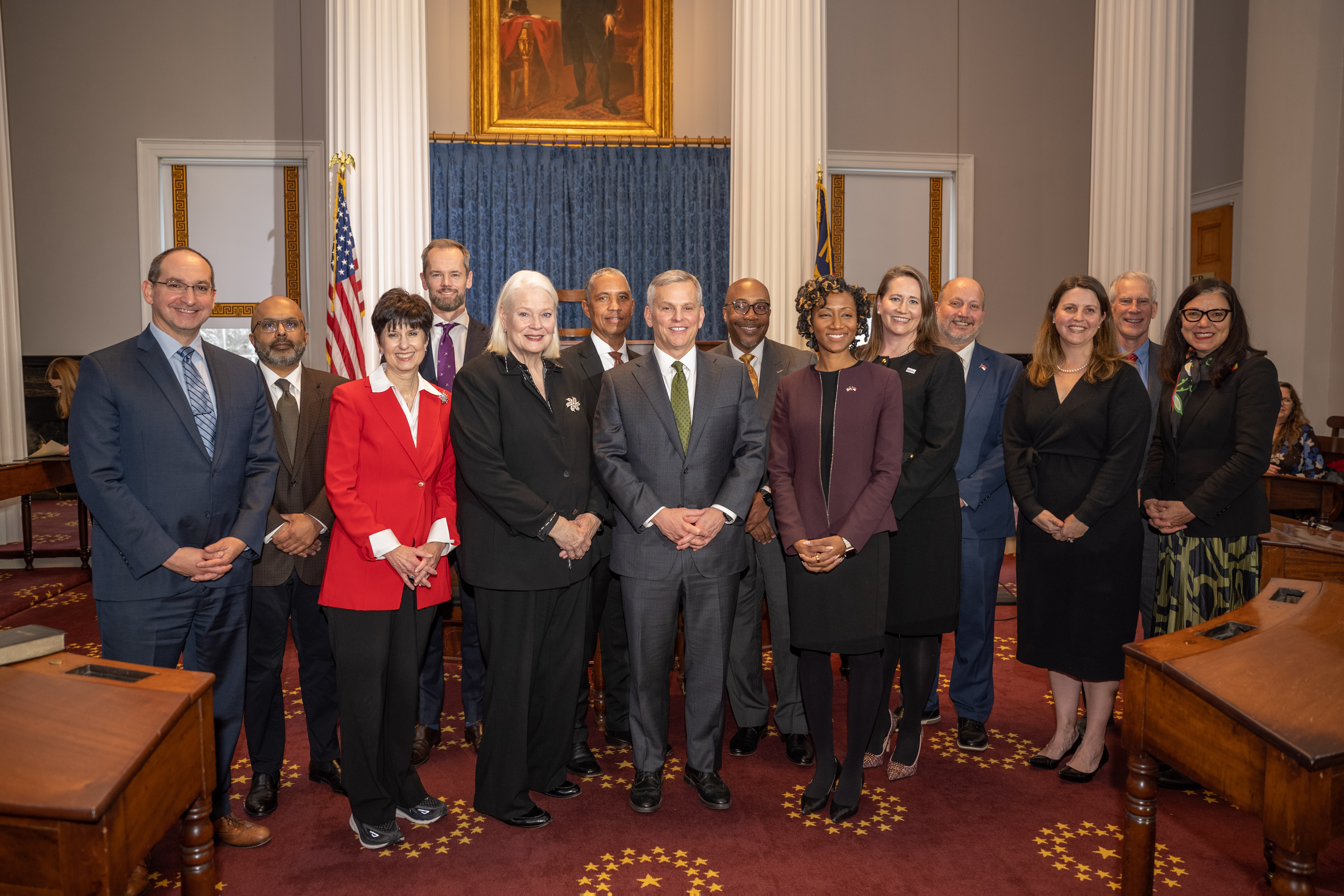
Governor Stein (center) with his newly sworn in cabinet members, 2025

On January 1, 2025, Stein was sworn in as the 76th governor of North Carolina, becoming the state's first Jewish governor.

As governor, Stein has prioritized western North Carolina's recovery from Hurricane Helene, the worst natural disaster to hit the state in recorded history and the 7th-costliest natural disaster in US history. In July 2026, Stein signed his first budget into law after the state had gone without a budget for nearly three years amid a standoff between the state House and Senate, both held by Republicans. Stein applauded the budget's investments in teacher pay, law enforcement pay, and Helene recovery, calling the starting teacher pay raises the highest in nearly half a century. He also criticized certain provisions, saying, "This budget has real flaws", pointing to cuts to the public sector workforce and provisions hostile to local governments.

In December 2025, Stein announced that his first year in office marked the state's best year for corporate commitments of jobs and investments. He also announced the culmination of the state's medical debt relief program, which forgave more than $6.5 billion in medical debt for more than 2.5 million people. In early 2025, Stein launched a modernization effort of the state's DMV. He later said the overhaul had reduced customer wait times by about 87%.

Stein has expressed support for the legalization of adult cannabis use, arguing the move is necessary for public safety because the state's current policy means "we have no rules whatsoever" regarding the regulation of the sale and production of cannabis. In response to the killing of Iryna Zarutska in Charlotte, Stein called for "more cops on the beat" and later signed a bill into law overhauling the state's pre-trial release policies while criticizing it for not going far enough. He also reiterated his calls for the state legislature to pass a law enforcement package to address vacancies. In July 2025, Stein criticized anti-Israel resolutions passed by North Carolina Democrats, saying the state Democratic Party "should focus on issues we're facing here".

=== Approval ratings ===
February 2025
| Poll source | Date | Sample size (Note: Key: A – all adults RV – registered voters LV – likely voters V – unclear) | MoE | Approve | Disapprove | Unsure/ Other |
|---|---|---|---|---|---|---|
| Catawba College-YouGov | June 1–10, 2026 | 1000 A | ± 3.83% | 53% | 27% | 20% |
| High Point University | August 27–September 11, 2025 | 950 A | ± 3.3% | 46% | 24% | 30% |
| Catawba College-YouGov | August 11–18, 2025 | 1000 A | ± 3.83% | 58% | 30% | 12% |
| Harper Polling/Carolina Journal | August 11–12, 2025 | 600 LV | ± 3.98% | 50.5% | 30.1% | 19.4% |
| Meredith College | February 2–8, 2025 | 759 RV | ± 3.5% | 56% | 24% | 20% |
| Carolina Journal/Cygnal (D) | March 9–10, 2025 | 615 LV | ± 3.94% | 55.6% | 20.4% | 24.0% |
| Carolina Journal/Cygnal (D) (Note: Poll taken prior to Stein's inauguration as Governor) | November 17–19, 2024 | 615 LV | ± 3.94% | 53.2% | 24.9% | 13.7% |

== Personal life ==
Stein is married to Anna Harris Stein. They have three children. He and his family are members of Temple Beth Or, a Reform synagogue in Raleigh. He is a former YMCA basketball and J.C.C. soccer coach. On May 17, 2025, Stein's Chapel Hill High School 1983 state champion boys' soccer team was inducted into the school's hall of fame.

Stein joined the Sons of the American Revolution in 2026 as a direct descendant of Aaron Willson, who served in the New Hampshire Militia during the American Revolutionary War.

== Electoral history ==
North Carolina Senate

2008 North Carolina Senate, 16th district election
| Party | Candidate | Votes | % |
|---|---|---|---|
| Democratic | Josh Stein | 58,357 | 60.83% |
| Republican | John Alexander | 37,586 | 39.17% |
| Total votes | | 95,943 | 100.00% |

2010 North Carolina Senate, 16th district election
| Party | Candidate | Votes | % |
|---|---|---|---|
| Democratic | Josh Stein (incumbent) | 32,248 | 54.89% |
| Republican | Michael Beezley | 24,466 | 41.64% |
| Libertarian | Stephanie Watson | 2,040 | 3.47% |
| Total votes | | 58,754 | 100.00% |

2012 North Carolina Senate, 16th district election
| Party | Candidate | Votes | % |
|---|---|---|---|
| Democratic | Josh Stein (incumbent) | 69,405 | 100.00% |
| Total votes | | 69,405 | 100.00% |

2014 North Carolina Senate, 16th district election
| Party | Candidate | Votes | % |
|---|---|---|---|
| Democratic | Josh Stein (incumbent) | 42,422 | 67.11% |
| Republican | Jason Mitchell | 20,791 | 32.89% |
| Total votes | | 63,213 | 100.00% |

Attorney general

2016 North Carolina Attorney General primary
| Party | Candidate | Votes | % |
|---|---|---|---|
| Democratic | Josh Stein | 510,003 | 53.37% |
| Democratic | Marcus Williams | 445,524 | 46.63% |
| Total votes | | 955,527 | 100.00% |

2016 North Carolina Attorney General election
| Party | Candidate | Votes | % |
|---|---|---|---|
| Democratic | Josh Stein | 2,276,410 | 50.27% |
| Republican | Buck Newton | 2,256,178 | 49.73% |
| Total votes | | 4,532,588 | 100.00% |

2020 North Carolina Attorney General election
| Party | Candidate | Votes | % | ±% |
|---|---|---|---|---|
| Democratic | Josh Stein (incumbent) | 2,713,400 | 50.13% | −0.14% |
| Republican | Jim O'Neill | 2,699,778 | 49.87% | +0.14% |
| Total votes | | 5,413,178 | 100.00% | N/A |

Governor

2024 North Carolina gubernatorial primary
| Party | Candidate | Votes | % |
|---|---|---|---|
| Democratic | Josh Stein | 476,448 | 69.64% |
| Democratic | Michael R. Morgan | 97,908 | 14.31% |
| Democratic | Chrelle Booker | 45,695 | 6.68% |
| Democratic | Marcus Williams | 38,996 | 5.70% |
| Democratic | Gary Foxx | 25,100 | 3.67% |
| Total votes | | 684,147 | 100.00% |

2024 North Carolina gubernatorial election
| Party | Candidate | Votes | % | ±% |
|---|---|---|---|---|
| Democratic | Josh Stein | 3,069,496 | 54.90% | +3.38% |
| Republican | Mark Robinson | 2,241,309 | 40.08% | –6.93% |
| Libertarian | Mike Ross | 176,392 | 3.14% | +2.04% |
| Constitution | Vinny Smith | 54,607 | 0.98% | N/A |
| Green | Wayne Turner | 49,384 | 0.88% | N/A |
| Total votes | | 5,591,547 | 100.00% | |
| Democratic hold | | | | |

== See also ==
- List of Jewish American jurists

Party political offices
| Preceded by Roy Cooper | Democratic nominee for Attorney General of North Carolina; 2016, 2020 | Succeeded by Jeff Jackson |
| Preceded by Roy Cooper | Democratic nominee for Governor of North Carolina; 2024 | Most recent |
Legal offices
| Preceded by Roy Cooper | Attorney General of North Carolina; 2017–2025 | Succeeded by Jeff Jackson |
Political offices
| Preceded by Roy Cooper | Governor of North Carolina; 2025–present | Incumbent |
U.S. order of precedence (ceremonial)
| Preceded by JD Vance as Vice President | Order of precedence of the United States; Within North Carolina | Succeeded by Mayor of city in which event is held |
| Preceded by JD Vance as Vice President | Order of precedence of the United States; Within North Carolina | Succeeded by Otherwise Mike Johnson as Speaker of the House |
| Preceded by Kathy Hochul as Governor of New York | Order of precedence of the United States; Outside North Carolina | Succeeded by Dan McKee as Governor of Rhode Island |
