= Tommy Tucker (politician) =

American politician

Senator Tommy Tucker
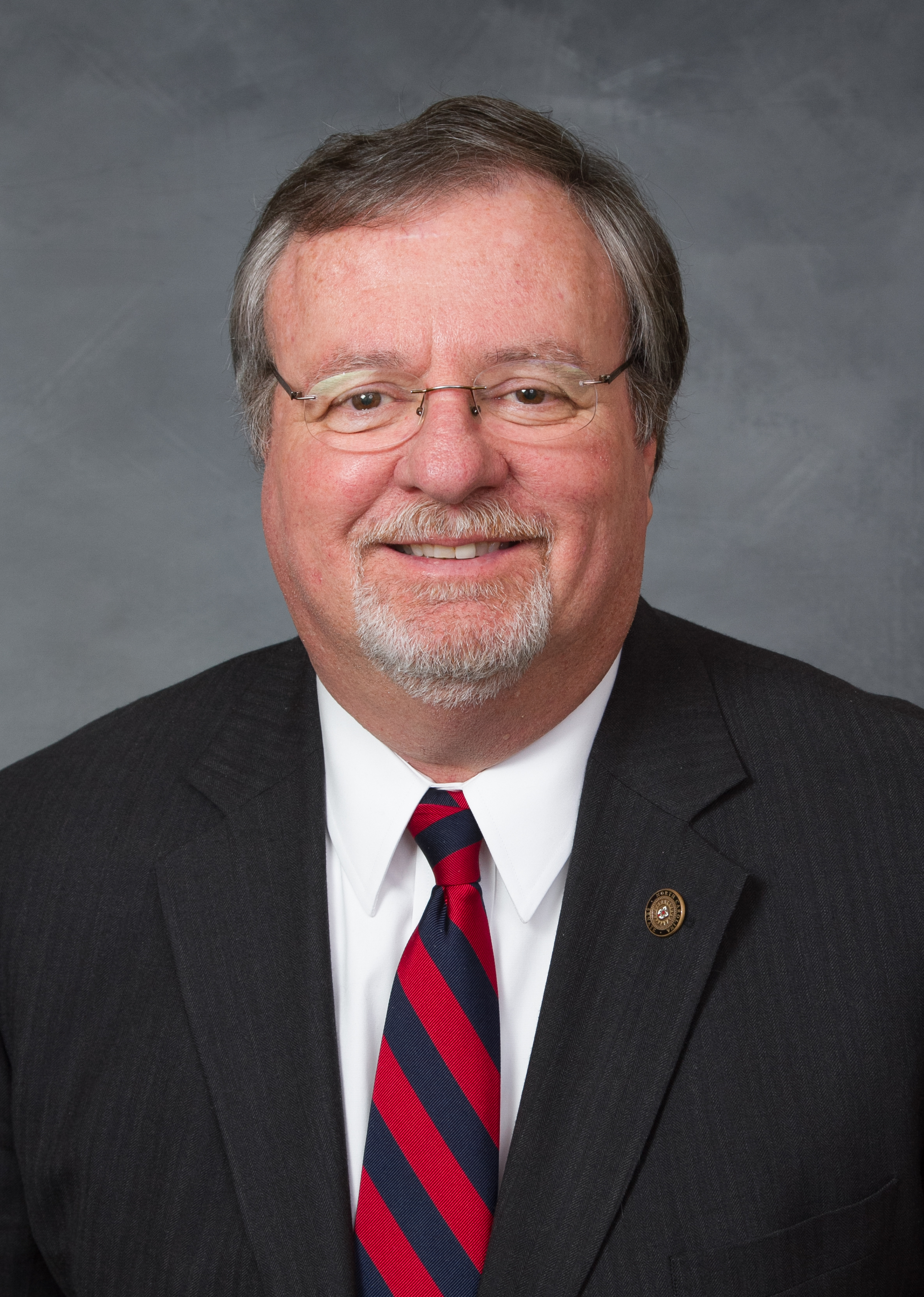

Member of the North Carolina Senate from the 35th district
- In office January 1, 2011 – January 1, 2019
- Preceded by: Eddie Goodall
- Succeeded by: Todd Johnson

Personal details
- Born: Wyatt Thomas Tucker, Sr. May 25, 1950 (age 76)
- Party: Republican
- Education: North Carolina State University
- Occupation: businessman

Wyatt Thomas Tucker Sr. (born May 25, 1950) is an American politician and former Republican state senator in the state of North Carolina. He served as co-chairman of the North Carolina Senate's State and Local Government Committee. Senator Tucker has been accused of the statement "I am the senator, you are the citizen, you need to be quiet," when responding to a citizen journalist's inquiry on North Carolina's senatorial rules and procedures, though he said he was misquoted. In 2013 Sen. Tucker came under criticism for helping direct Rural Center funds to the development of a movie theater. In August 2017 Senator Tucker announced his intention to retire.

North Carolina Senate
Preceded by Eddie Goodall	Member of the North Carolina Senate from the 35th district 2011-2019	Succeeded by Todd Johnson
