= Richard Y. Stevens =

American politician from North Carolina

Senator Richard Stevens

Member of the North Carolina Senate from the 17th district
- In office January 1, 2003 – September 7, 2012
- Preceded by: Constituency established
- Succeeded by: Tamara Barringer

Personal details
- Born: Richard Yates Stevens; December 12, 1948 (age 77)
- Party: Republican
- Spouse: Jere
- Education: University of North Carolina, Chapel Hill (BA, JD, MPA)
- Occupation: management consultant, county manager

Richard Yates Stevens (born December 12, 1948) is a former Republican member of the North Carolina General Assembly. He represented the state's seventeenth Senate district, including constituents in Wake County, North Carolina. A management consultant and former county manager from Cary, North Carolina, Stevens was elected to five consecutive terms in the state Senate. He chose not to run for another term in 2012, and then resigned before the end of his term.

North Carolina Senate
Preceded by Bill Purcell; Aaron Plyler	Member of the North Carolina Senate from the 17th district 2003–2012	Succeeded by Tamara Barringer
