= North Carolina's 35th Senate district =

American legislative district

North Carolina's 35th State Senate district
Senator
Todd Johnson; R–Monroe
- Demographics: 69% White; 10% Black; 13% Hispanic; 4% Asian; 4% Multiracial
- Population (2023): 222,628

North Carolina's 35th Senate district is one of 50 districts in the North Carolina Senate. It has been represented by Republican Todd Johnson since 2019.

== Geography ==
Since 2023, the district has covered parts of Union and Cabarrus counties. The district overlaps with the 55th, 68th, 69th, and 82nd state house districts.

== District officeholders ==
Senator	Party	Dates	Notes	Counties
Jerry Blackmon (Charlotte)	Republican	January 1, 1991 – January 1, 1997	Retired.	1991–2003; Part of Mecklenburg County.
Bob Rucho (Matthews)	Republican	January 1, 1997 – January 1, 2003	Redistricted to the 39th district.	1991–2003; Part of Mecklenburg County.
Fern Shubert (Marshville)	Republican	January 1, 2003 – January 1, 2005	Retired to run for Governor.	2003–2013; All of Union County. Part of Mecklenburg County.
Eddie Goodall (Weddington)	Republican	January 1, 2005 – January 1, 2011	Retired.	2003–2013; All of Union County. Part of Mecklenburg County.
Tommy Tucker (Waxhaw)	Republican	January 1, 2011 – January 1, 2019	Retired.	2003–2013; All of Union County. Part of Mecklenburg County.
Tommy Tucker (Waxhaw)	Republican	January 1, 2011 – January 1, 2019	Retired.	2013–2023; Part of Union County.
Todd Johnson (Monroe)	Republican	January 1, 2019 – Present		2013–2023; Part of Union County.
Todd Johnson (Monroe)	Republican	January 1, 2019 – Present		2023–Present; Parts of Union and Cabarrus counties.

== Election results ==
=== 2024 ===
North Carolina Senate 35th district general election, 2024
Party	Candidate	Votes	%
Republican	Todd Johnson (incumbent)	82,030	63.34%
Democratic	Robin Mann	47,486	36.66%
Total votes		129,516	100%
Republican hold			

=== 2022 ===
North Carolina Senate 35th district general election, 2022
Party	Candidate	Votes	%
Republican	Todd Johnson (incumbent)	58,501	100%
Total votes		58,501	100%
Republican hold			

=== 2020 ===
North Carolina Senate 35th district general election, 2020
Party	Candidate	Votes	%
Republican	Todd Johnson (incumbent)	75,055	63.45%
Democratic	Jose Santiago	43,244	36.55%
Total votes		118,299	100%
Republican hold			

=== 2018 ===
North Carolina Senate 35th district general election, 2018
Party	Candidate	Votes	%
Republican	Todd Johnson	49,848	61.51%
Democratic	Caroline L. Walker	31,188	38.49%
Total votes		81,036	100%
Republican hold			

=== 2016 ===
North Carolina Senate 35th district Republican primary election, 2016
Party	Candidate	Votes	%
Republican	Tommy Tucker (incumbent)	15,327	61.62%
Republican	Matt Daly	9,546	38.38%
Total votes		24,873	100%

North Carolina Senate 35th district general election, 2016
Party	Candidate	Votes	%
Republican	Tommy Tucker (incumbent)	73,032	100%
Total votes		73,032	100%
Republican hold			

=== 2014 ===
North Carolina Senate 35th district general election, 2014
Party	Candidate	Votes	%
Republican	Tommy Tucker (incumbent)	39,188	100%
Total votes		39,188	100%
Republican hold			

=== 2012 ===
North Carolina Senate 35th district general election, 2012
Party	Candidate	Votes	%
Republican	Tommy Tucker (incumbent)	62,213	100%
Total votes		62,213	100%
Republican hold			

=== 2010 ===
North Carolina Senate 35th district Republican primary election, 2010
Party	Candidate	Votes	%
Republican	Tommy Tucker	7,471	56.62%
Republican	Fern Shubert	5,723	43.38%
Total votes		13,194	100%

North Carolina Senate 35th district general election, 2010
Party	Candidate	Votes	%
Republican	Tommy Tucker	44,624	71.38%
Democratic	Ed McGuire	17,890	28.62%
Total votes		62,514	100%
Republican hold			

=== 2008 ===
North Carolina Senate District 35th district general election, 2008
Party	Candidate	Votes	%
Republican	Eddie Goodall (incumbent)	75,025	100%
Total votes		75,025	100%
Republican hold			

=== 2006 ===
North Carolina Senate 35th district Republican primary election, 2006
Party	Candidate	Votes	%
Republican	Eddie Goodall (incumbent)	4,695	77.89%
Republican	C. William Brooks	1,333	22.11%
Total votes		6,028	100%

North Carolina Senate District 35th district general election, 2006
Party	Candidate	Votes	%
Republican	Eddie Goodall (incumbent)	29,301	100%
Total votes		29,301	100%
Republican hold			

=== 2004 ===
North Carolina Senate 35th district Republican primary election, 2004
Party	Candidate	Votes	%
Republican	Eddie Goodall	6,536	69.16%
Republican	Paul Standridge	2,915	30.84%
Total votes		9,451	100%

North Carolina Senate District 35th district general election, 2004
Party	Candidate	Votes	%
Republican	Eddie Goodall	55,204	99.59%
Independent	Cornelius F. "Neal" Brantley Jr. (write-in)	230	0.41%
Total votes		55,434	100%
Republican hold			

=== 2002 ===
North Carolina Senate 35th district Republican primary election, 2002
Party	Candidate	Votes	%
Republican	Fern Shubert	5,823	49.23%
Republican	Eddie Goodall	2,122	17.94%
Republican	Clayton Loflin	1,541	13.03%
Republican	Paul Standridge	1,220	10.31%
Republican	W. P. "Bill" Davis	1,122	9.49%
Total votes		11,828	100%

North Carolina Senate 35th district general election, 2002
Party	Candidate	Votes	%
Republican	Fern Shubert	33,822	66.68%
Democratic	Frank McGuirt	16,903	33.32%
Total votes		50,725	100%
Republican gain from Democratic			

=== 2000 ===
North Carolina Senate 35th district general election, 2000
Party	Candidate	Votes	%
Republican	Bob Rucho (incumbent)	55,295	66.78%
Democratic	David Allen	27,511	33.22%
Total votes		82,806	100%
Republican hold			
