= North Carolina's 39th Senate district =

American legislative district

North Carolina's 39th State Senate district
Senator
DeAndrea Salvador; D–Charlotte
- Demographics: 48% White; 23% Black; 18% Hispanic; 5% Asian; 4% Multiracial
- Population (2023): 233,552

North Carolina's 39th Senate district is one of 50 districts in the North Carolina Senate. It has been represented by Democrat DeAndrea Salvador since 2021.

== Geography ==
Since 2003, the district has covered part of Mecklenburg County. The district overlaps with the 88th, 92nd, 103rd, and 104th state house districts.

== District officeholders since 1993 ==
Senator	Party	Dates	Notes	Counties
District created January 1, 1993.				1993–2003; Parts of Iredell, Lincoln, and Gaston counties.
James Forrester (Stanley)	Republican	January 1, 1993 – January 1, 2003	Redistricted from the 25th district. Redistricted to the 42nd district.	1993–2003; Parts of Iredell, Lincoln, and Gaston counties.
Bob Rucho (Matthews)	Republican	January 1, 2003 – January 1, 2005	Redistricted from the 35th district. Retired.	2003–Present; Part of Mecklenburg County.
Robert Pittenger (Charlotte)	Republican	January 1, 2005 – May 27, 2008	Redistricted from the 40th district. Resigned to run for Lieutenant Governor.	2003–Present; Part of Mecklenburg County.
Vacant		May 27, 2008 – June 9, 2008		2003–Present; Part of Mecklenburg County.
Bob Rucho (Matthews)	Republican	June 9, 2008 – January 1, 2017	Appointed to finish Pittenger's term. Retired.	2003–Present; Part of Mecklenburg County.
Dan Bishop (Charlotte)	Republican	January 1, 2017 – September 17, 2019	Retired to assume seat in Congress.	2003–Present; Part of Mecklenburg County.
Vacant		September 17, 2019 – October 2, 2019		2003–Present; Part of Mecklenburg County.
Rob Bryan (Charlotte)	Republican	October 2, 2019 – January 1, 2021	Appointed to finish Bishop's term. Retired.	2003–Present; Part of Mecklenburg County.
DeAndrea Salvador (Charlotte)	Democratic	January 1, 2021 – Present		2003–Present; Part of Mecklenburg County.

== Election results ==
=== 2024 ===
North Carolina Senate 39th district general election, 2024
Party	Candidate	Votes	%
Democratic	DeAndrea Salvador (incumbent)	88,183	100%
Total votes		88,183	100%
Democratic hold			

=== 2022 ===
North Carolina Senate 39th district general election, 2022
Party	Candidate	Votes	%
Democratic	DeAndrea Salvador (incumbent)	47,284	63.86%
Republican	Mark Robeson	26,760	36.14%
Total votes		74,044	100%
Democratic hold			

=== 2020 ===
North Carolina Senate 39th district general election, 2020
Party	Candidate	Votes	%
Democratic	DeAndrea Salvador	68,752	62.18%
Republican	Joshua Niday	41,823	37.82%
Total votes		110,575	100%
Democratic gain from Republican			

=== 2018 ===
North Carolina Senate 39th district Democratic primary election, 2018
Party	Candidate	Votes	%
Democratic	Chad Stachowicz	5,239	50.08%
Democratic	Ann Harlan	5,222	49.92%
Total votes		10,461	100%

North Carolina Senate 39th district Republican primary election, 2018
Party	Candidate	Votes	%
Republican	Dan Bishop (incumbent)	8,778	71.28%
Republican	Beth Monaghan	3,537	28.72%
Total votes		12,315	100%

North Carolina Senate 39th district general election, 2018
Party	Candidate	Votes	%
Republican	Dan Bishop (incumbent)	49,698	52.89%
Democratic	Chad Stachowicz	44,273	47.11%
Total votes		93,971	100%
Republican hold			

=== 2016 ===
North Carolina Senate 39th district general election, 2016
Party	Candidate	Votes	%
Republican	Dan Bishop	58,739	56.81%
Democratic	Lloyd Scher	44,655	43.19%
Total votes		103,394	100%
Republican hold			

=== 2014 ===
North Carolina Senate 39th district Republican primary election, 2014
Party	Candidate	Votes	%
Republican	Bob Rucho (incumbent)	7,281	55.18%
Republican	Matt Arnold	5,914	44.82%
Total votes		13,195	100%

North Carolina Senate 39th district general election, 2014
Party	Candidate	Votes	%
Republican	Bob Rucho (incumbent)	44,091	100%
Total votes		44,091	100%
Republican hold			

=== 2012 ===
North Carolina Senate 39th district general election, 2012
Party	Candidate	Votes	%
Republican	Bob Rucho (incumbent)	61,006	61.60%
Democratic	Jack Flynn	38,025	38.40%
Total votes		99,031	100%
Republican hold			

=== 2010 ===
North Carolina Senate 39th district general election, 2010
Party	Candidate	Votes	%
Republican	Bob Rucho (incumbent)	48,373	100%
Total votes		48,373	100%
Republican hold			

=== 2008 ===
North Carolina Senate 39th district Republican primary election, 2008
Party	Candidate	Votes	%
Republican	Bob Rucho	9,342	51.95%
Republican	Andy Dulin	8,639	48.05%
Total votes		17,981	100%

North Carolina Senate 39th district general election, 2008
Party	Candidate	Votes	%
Republican	Bob Rucho (incumbent)	73,799	100%
Total votes		73,799	100%
Republican hold			

=== 2006 ===
North Carolina Senate 39th district general election, 2006
Party	Candidate	Votes	%
Republican	Robert Pittenger (incumbent)	35,503	100%
Total votes		35,503	100%
Republican hold			

=== 2004 ===
North Carolina Senate 39th district general election, 2004
Party	Candidate	Votes	%
Republican	Robert Pittenger (incumbent)	64,948	89.08%
Libertarian	Andy Grum	7,965	10.92%
Total votes		72,913	100%
Republican hold			

=== 2002 ===
North Carolina Senate 39th district general election, 2002
Party	Candidate	Votes	%
Republican	Bob Rucho (incumbent)	37,700	65.15%
Democratic	Joe Spencer	18,244	31.53%
Libertarian	Heather Head	1,919	3.32%
Total votes		57,863	100%
Republican hold			

=== 2000 ===
North Carolina Senate 39th district general election, 2000
Party	Candidate	Votes	%
Republican	James Forrester (incumbent)	45,529	100%
Total votes		45,529	100%
Republican hold			
