= Bob Rucho =

American dentist and politician (born 1948)

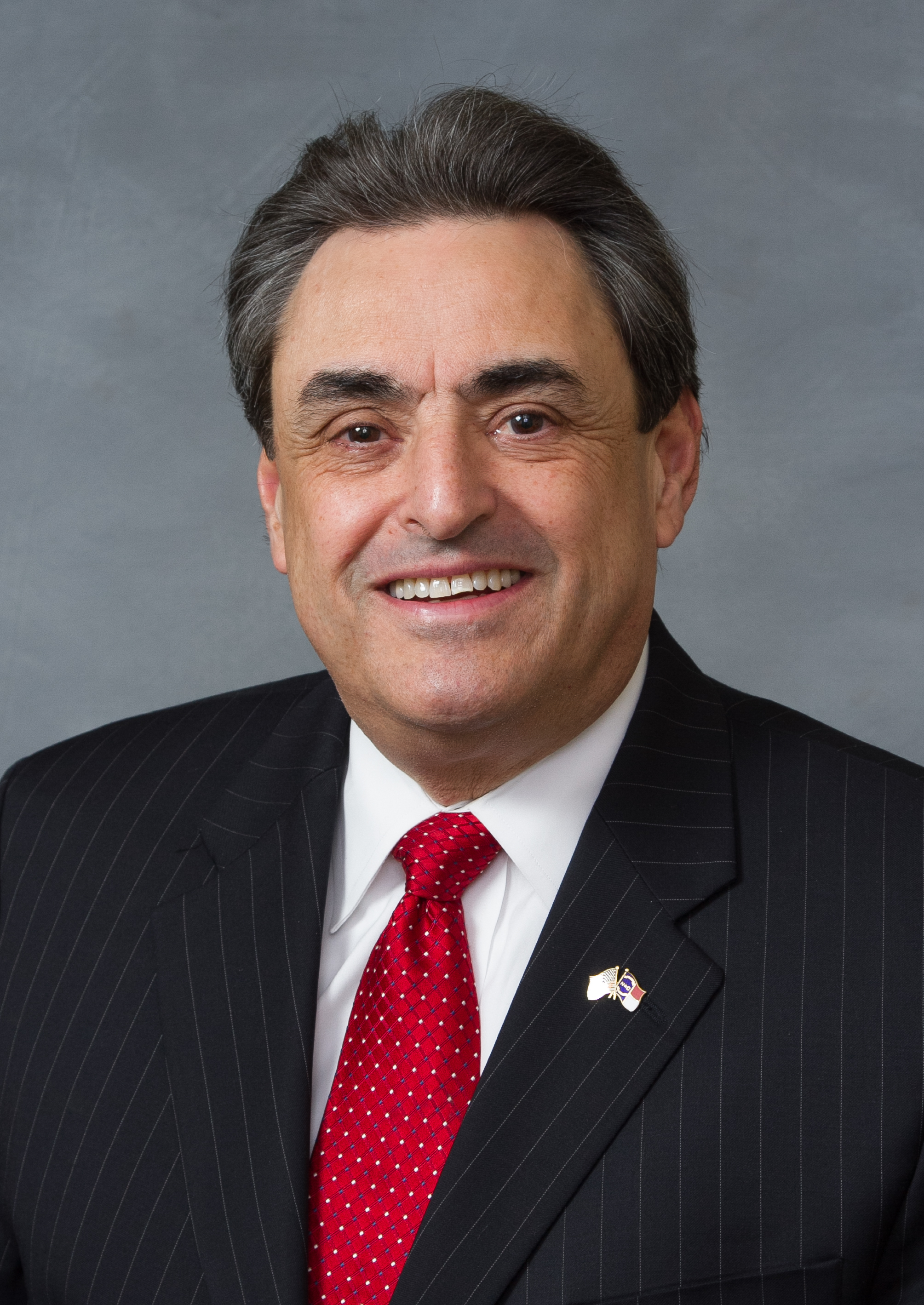
- Official portrait, 2013

Member of the North Carolina Senate
- In office June 9, 2008 – January 1, 2017
- Preceded by: Robert Pittenger
- Succeeded by: Dan Bishop
- Constituency: 39th district
- In office January 1, 1997 – January 1, 2005
- Preceded by: Jerry Blackmon
- Succeeded by: Robert Pittenger
- Constituency: 35th district (1997–2003); 39th district (2003–2005)

Member of the North Carolina State Board of Elections
- In office May 7, 2025 – March 5, 2026

Personal details
- Born: Robert Anthony Rucho; December 8, 1948 (age 77) Worcester, Massachusetts, U.S.
- Party: Republican
- Education: Northeastern University; University of North Carolina at Charlotte
- Occupation: Dentist; politician

Robert Anthony Rucho (born December 8, 1948) is an American dentist and former Republican politician who served as Member of the North Carolina General Assembly representing the state's thirty-ninth Senate district, including parts of Mecklenburg County.

== Career ==
Rucho, a dentist from Matthews, North Carolina, served as co-chairman of the Senate Finance Committee until his abrupt resignation in June 2013 following a dispute with Senate President Pro Tempore Phil Berger over tax reform policy. Berger never accepted the resignation and the next month, Rucho resumed his chairmanship.

=== Views on the Affordable Care Act ===
Rucho gained much criticism, including from within his own party, after he tweeted "Justice Roberts's pen & Obamacare has done more damage to the USA then [sic] the swords of the Nazis, Soviets & terrorists combined" on December 15, 2013.

=== Rucho v. Common Cause ===
Rucho notably was named as the defendant in the 2019 Supreme Court case Rucho v. Common Cause, which involved redistricting and partisan gerrymandering. Though Rucho had already departed the state legislature by the time the case made its way up to the Supreme Court, he had previously been the chair of the committee in the state senate responsible for redrawing North Carolina's congressional districts, which drew a map heavily favoring Republicans under his leadership.

North Carolina Senate
Preceded by Jerry Blackmon	Member of the North Carolina Senate from the 35th district 1997–2003	Succeeded by Fern Shubert
Preceded by James Forrester	Member of the North Carolina Senate from the 39th district 2003–2005	Succeeded by Robert Pittenger
Preceded by Robert Pittenger	Member of the North Carolina Senate from the 39th district 2008–2017	Succeeded by Dan Bishop
