= Don W. East =

American politician from North Carolina

Member of the North Carolina Senate
- In office January 1, 2005 – October 22, 2012
- Preceded by: Constituency established
- Succeeded by: Shirley B. Randleman
- Constituency: 30th district
- In office January 1, 1995 – January 1, 2001
- Preceded by: Alexander Paul Sands III; Fred Folger Jr.
- Succeeded by: Phil Berger
- Constituency: 12th district

Personal details
- Born: December 26, 1944 Pilot Mountain, North Carolina, U.S.
- Died: October 22, 2012 (aged 67) Winston-Salem, North Carolina, U.S.
- Party: Republican

Don W. East (December 26, 1944 – October 22, 2012) was an American politician who served in the North Carolina Senate from 1995 to 2001 and from 2005 until his death in 2012.

He died on October 22, 2012, in Winston-Salem, North Carolina, at age 67.

North Carolina Senate
Preceded by Alexander Paul Sands III; Fred Folger Jr.	Member of the North Carolina Senate from the 12th district 1995–2001; Served alongside: Virginia Foxx	Succeeded by Phil Berger
Preceded by John A. Garwood	Member of the North Carolina Senate from the 30th district 2005–2012	Succeeded by Shirley B. Randleman
