= William R. Purcell =

American politician

William Purcell

Personal details
- Born: February 12, 1931 (age 95) Laurinburg, North Carolina
- Party: Democratic
- Profession: Doctor

William Robert Purcell (born February 12, 1931, in Laurinburg, North Carolina) is a Democratic politician. He was a member of the North Carolina General Assembly representing the state's twenty-fifth Senate district, including constituents in Anson, Richmond, Scotland and Stanly counties 1997–2013. Purcell served as a captain in the U.S. army medical corp in France from 1957 to 1959. Purcell then graduated from Davidson College and the University of North Carolina School of Medicine and was a pediatrician. Purcell served on the Laurinburg, North Carolina, city council and was mayor.
