= W. Edward Goodall =

North Carolina politician

W. Edward Goodall (Eddie Goodall) is a former North Carolina state senator and former director of the NC Public Charter Schools Association. Goodall, a Republican, served in the North Carolina Senate from 2005 to 2011 for District 35, consisting of Mecklenburg Country and Union County.
