= 2026 North Carolina Senate election =

- November 3, 2026

All 50 seats in the North Carolina Senate 26 (Note: The lieutenant governor casts a vote in the event of a tie) seats needed for a majority
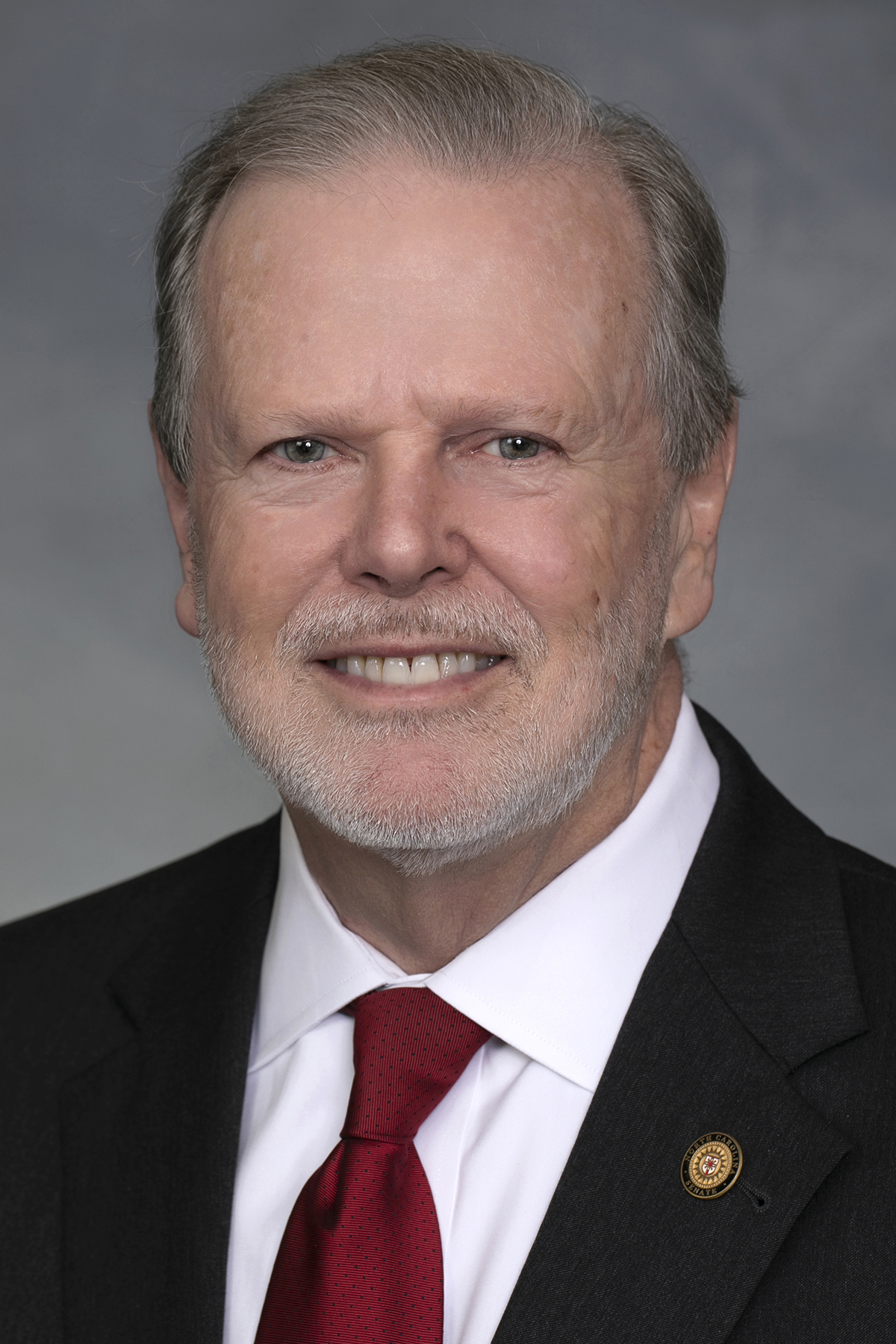

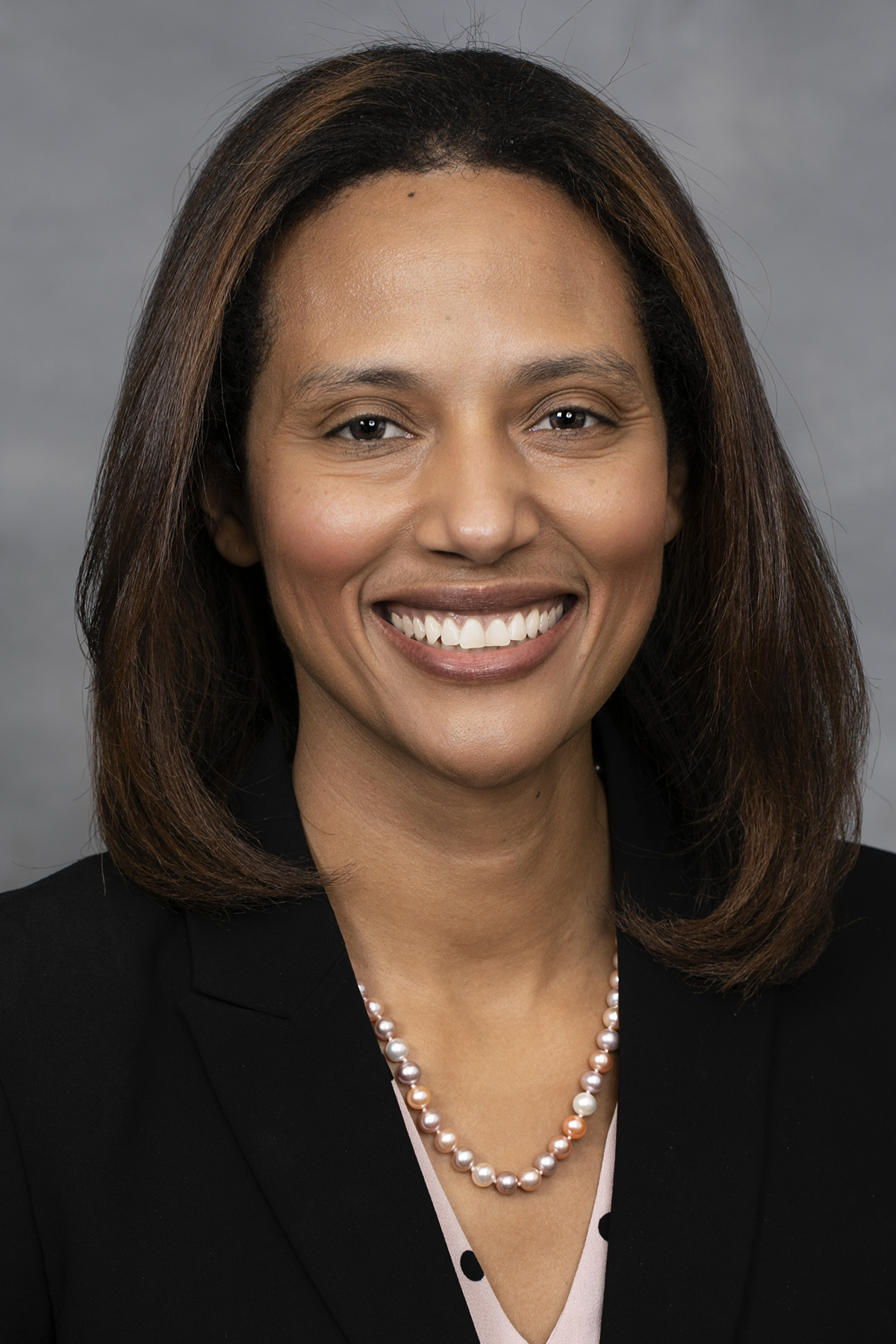
	Majority party	Minority party
Leader	Phil Berger (Lost re-nomination)	Sydney Batch
Party	Republican	Democratic
Leader since	January 1, 2005	January 1, 2025
Leader's seat	26th–Eden	17th–Holly Springs
Last election	30	20
Seats before	30	20
Seats won	26	24
Seat change	▼4	▲4
- Republican hold Democratic hold Democratic gain
President pro tempore before election
Phil Berger
Republican
Elected President pro tempore
TBD
Republican

The 2026 North Carolina Senate election was held on November 3, 2026, to elect all 50 members to North Carolina's Senate. The election coincided with elections for other offices, including for the U.S Senate, U.S. House of Representatives, and State House. Voters elected members of the North Carolina Senate in all 50 of the U.S. state of North Carolina's Senate districts to serve a two-year term. Primary elections were held on March 3, 2026.

== Results summary ==
District	2024 Pres.	Incumbent	Party	Elected	Party
1st	R+14.8	Bobby Hanig†	Rep	Jerry Tillett	Rep
2nd	R+16.9	Norman Sanderson	Rep	Norman Sanderson	Rep
3rd	R+19.6	Bob Brinson	Rep	Bob Brinson	Rep
4th	R+10.0	Buck Newton	Rep	Jess Rivera	Dem
5th	D+9.6	Kandie Smith	Dem	Kandie Smith	Dem
6th	R+35.9	Michael Lazzara	Rep	Michael Lazzara	Rep
7th	R+5.6	Michael Lee	Rep	Jessica Bichler	Dem
8th	R+18.9	Bill Rabon	Rep	Bill Rabon	Rep
9th	R+29.3	Brent Jackson	Rep	Brent Jackson	Rep
10th	R+21.5	Benton Sawrey	Rep	Benton Sawrey	Rep
11th	R+3.5	Lisa Stone Barnes	Rep	James Gailliard	Dem
12th	R+23.6	Jim Burgin	Rep	Jim Burgin	Rep
13th	D+4.6	Lisa Grafstein	Dem	Lisa Grafstein	Dem
14th	D+46.7	Dan Blue	Dem	Dan Blue	Dem
15th	D+36.9	Jay Chaudhuri	Dem	Jay Chaudhuri	Dem
16th	D+34.7	Gale Adcock	Dem	Gale Adcock	Dem
17th	D+29.2	Sydney Batch	Dem	Sydney Batch	Dem
18th	R+0.5	Haseeb Fatmi	Dem	Haseeb Fatmi	Dem
19th	D+28.3	Val Applewhite	Dem	Val Applewhite	Dem
20th	D+43.9	Natalie Murdock	Dem	Natalie Murdock	Dem
21st	R+22.6	Tom McInnis	Rep	Tom McInnis	Rep
22nd	D+58.8	Sophia Chitlik	Dem	Sophia Chitlik	Dem
23rd	D+29.9	Jonah Garson (Note: Garson was appointed on April 10, 2026, to succeed incumbent Democrat Graig Meyer, who resigned to become executive director of the North Carolina Justice Center.)	Dem	Jonah Garson	Dem
24th	R+15.0	Danny Britt	Rep	Danny Britt	Rep
25th	R+19.4	Amy Galey	Rep	Amy Galey	Rep
26th	R+21.9	Phil Berger‡	Rep	Sam Page	Rep
27th	D+20.0	Michael Garrett	Dem	Michael Garrett	Dem
28th	D+51.9	Gladys Robinson	Dem	Gladys Robinson	Dem
29th	R+37.9	Dave Craven	Rep	Dave Craven	Rep
30th	R+46.7	Steve Jarvis	Rep	Steve Jarvis	Rep
31st	R+22.9	Dana Caudill Jones	Rep	Dana Caudill Jones	Rep
32nd	D+39.9	Paul Lowe Jr.	Dem	Paul Lowe Jr.	Dem
33rd	R+40.8	Carl Ford	Rep	Carl Ford	Rep
34th	R+8.2	Chris Measmer‡	Rep	April Cook	Dem
35th	R+24.2	Todd Johnson	Rep	Todd Johnson	Rep
36th	R+58.0	Eddie Settle	Rep	Eddie Settle	Rep
37th	R+26.7	Vickie Sawyer	Rep	Vickie Sawyer	Rep
38th	D+36.3	Mujtaba Mohammed	Dem	Mujtaba Mohammed	Dem
39th	D+33.2	DeAndrea Salvador	Dem	DeAndrea Salvador	Dem
40th	D+48.7	Joyce Waddell	Dem	Joyce Waddell	Dem
41st	D+51.3	Caleb Theodros	Dem	Caleb Theodros	Dem
42nd	D+6.5	Woodson Bradley	Dem	Woodson Bradley	Dem
43rd	R+22.1	Brad Overcash	Rep	Brad Overcash	Rep
44th	R+42.0	Ted Alexander	Rep	Ted Alexander	Rep
45th	R+42.1	Mark Hollo	Rep	Mark Hollo	Rep
46th	R+31.8	Warren Daniel	Rep	Warren Daniel	Rep
47th	R+28.7	Ralph Hise	Rep	Ralph Hise	Rep
48th	R+25.5	Tim Moffitt	Rep	Tim Moffitt	Rep
49th	D+36.1	Julie Mayfield	Dem	Julie Mayfield	Dem
50th	R+29.2	Kevin Corbin	Rep	Kevin Corbin	Rep

† - Incumbent not seeking re-election
‡ - Incumbent defeated in primary

=== Retiring incumbents ===
==== Republicans ====
- District 1: Bobby Hanig (R) retired to run for North Carolina's 1st congressional district.

=== Incumbents defeated in the primary election ===
==== Republicans ====
- District 26: Phil Berger lost renomination to Sam Page.
- District 34: Chris Measmer lost renomination to Kevin Crutchfield.

=== Incumbents defeated in the general election ===
- District 4: Buck Newton (R) lost reelection to Jess Rivera (D)
- District 7: Michael Lee (R) lost reelection to Jessica Bichler (D)
- District 11: Lisa Stone Barnes (R) lost reelection to James Gailliard (D)

=== Open seats that changed parties ===
- District 34: Won by April Cook (D)

== Predictions ==
Source	Ranking	As of
Sabato's Crystal Ball	Likely R	October 16, 2026
State Navigate	Likely R	October 26, 2026

== Polling ==
Poll source	Date(s) administered	Sample size (Note: Key: A – all adults RV – registered voters LV – likely voters V – unclear)	Margin of error	Republican	Democratic	Other	Undecided
Catawba College/YouGov	September 4–15, 2026	881 (LV)	–	38%	47%	1% (Note: "I would not vote in this race" with 1%; "I would vote for another candidate" with 0%)	14%
Harper Polling (R)	May 10–11, 2026	600 (LV)	± 4.0%	41%	48%	–	11%
High Point University/YouGov	March 26 – April 6, 2026	703 (LV)	± 4.3%	44%	48%	2%	7%
High Point University/YouGov	March 26 – April 6, 2026	800 (RV)	± 4.1%	42%	46%	2%	10%
Harper Polling (R) (Note: Poll sponsored by The Carolina Journal)	March 22–23, 2026	600 (LV)	± 4.0%	43%	45%	–	12%
Change Research (D)	January 31 – February 4, 2026	1,069 (V)	± 3.1%	42%	45%	–	14%
Change Research (D) (Note: Poll sponsored by Carolina Forward)	January 5–7, 2026	1,105 (LV)	± 3.5%	43%	43%	–	14%

== Detailed results ==
=== Districts 1–25 ===
==== District 1 ====
Incumbent Republican Bobby Hanig has represented the 1st district and its predecessors since 2022. Hanig retired to run for Congress. Republican Jerry Tillett won the open seat.

North Carolina Senate 1st district Republican primary election, 2026
Party	Candidate	Votes	%
Republican	Jerry Tillett	7,543	37.83%
Republican	Jay Lane	6,295	31.57%
Republican	David Forsythe	3,159	15.84%
Republican	Cole Johnson	2,943	14.76%
Total votes		19,940	100%

North Carolina Senate 1st district general election, 2026
Party	Candidate	Votes	%
Republican	Jerry Tillett	43,069	52.01%
Democratic	Melissa Zehner	39,748	47.99%
Total votes		82,817	100%
Republican hold			

==== District 2 ====
Incumbent Republican Norman Sanderson has represented the 2nd district and its predecessors since 2013.

North Carolina Senate 2nd district general election, 2026
Party	Candidate	Votes	%
Republican	Norman Sanderson (incumbent)	47,298	53.75%
Democratic	Roy Surrett	40,705	46.25%
Total votes		88,003	100%
Republican hold			

==== District 3 ====
Incumbent Republican Bob Brinson has represented the 3rd district and its predecessors since 2024.

North Carolina Senate 3rd district general election, 2026
Party	Candidate	Votes	%
Republican	Bob Brinson (incumbent)	44,488	54.92%
Democratic	Charles Dudley	36,514	45.08%
Total votes		81,002	100%
Republican hold			

==== District 4 ====
Incumbent Republican Buck Newton, who had represented the 4th district since 2023, lost re-election to Democrat Jess Rivera.

North Carolina Senate 4th district general election, 2026
Party	Candidate	Votes	%
Democratic	Jess Rivera	37,821	51.16%
Republican	Buck Newton (incumbent)	36,109	48.84%
Total votes		73,930	100%
Democratic gain from Republican			

==== District 5 ====
Incumbent Democrat Kandie Smith has represented the 5th district since 2023.

North Carolina Senate 5th district Republican primary election, 2026
Party	Candidate	Votes	%
Republican	Henry Hostetler	5,377	83.29%
Republican	Angelene Mitchell	1,079	16.71%
Total votes		6,456	100%

North Carolina Senate 5th district general election, 2026
Party	Candidate	Votes	%
Democratic	Kandie Smith (incumbent)	50,024	61.85%
Republican	Henry Hostetler	30,861	38.15%
Total votes		80,885	100%
Democratic hold			

==== District 6 ====
Incumbent Republican Michael Lazzara has represented the 6th district since 2021.

North Carolina Senate 6th district general election, 2026
Party	Candidate	Votes	%
Republican	Michael Lazzara (incumbent)	30,285	60.29%
Democratic	Andi Morrow	19,944	39.71%
Total votes		50,229	100%
Republican hold			

==== District 7 ====
Incumbent Republican and Senate Majority Leader Michael Lee, who had represented the 7th district and its predecessors since 2021, lost re-election to Democrat Jessica Bichler.

North Carolina Senate 7th district general election, 2026
Party	Candidate	Votes	%
Democratic	Jessica Bichler	48,535	52.61%
Republican	Michael Lee (incumbent)	43,718	47.39%
Total votes		92,253	100%
Democratic gain from Republican			

==== District 8 ====
Incumbent Republican Bill Rabon has represented the 8th district since 2011.

North Carolina Senate 8th district general election, 2026
Party	Candidate	Votes	%
Republican	Bill Rabon (incumbent)	59,587	52.16%
Democratic	Richard Combes	52,142	45.64%
Libertarian	Tim White	2,516	2.20%
Total votes		114,245	100%
Republican hold			

==== District 9 ====
Incumbent Republican Brent Jackson has represented the 9th district and its predecessors since 2011.

North Carolina Senate 9th district Republican primary election, 2026
Party	Candidate	Votes	%
Republican	Brent Jackson (incumbent)	15,793	79.51%
Republican	William Barbour	4,070	20.49%
Total votes		19,863	100%

North Carolina Senate 9th district general election, 2026
Party	Candidate	Votes	%
Republican	Brent Jackson (incumbent)	48,596	100%
Total votes		48,596	100%
Republican hold			

==== District 10 ====
Incumbent Republican Benton Sawrey has represented the 10th district since 2023.

North Carolina Senate 10th district Republican primary election, 2026
Party	Candidate	Votes	%
Republican	Benton Sawrey (incumbent)	14,903	84.85%
Republican	Caitlin Marsh	2,661	15.15%
Total votes		17,564	100%

North Carolina Senate 10th district general election, 2026
Party	Candidate	Votes	%
Republican	Benton Sawrey (incumbent)	44,010	49.63%
Democratic	Pat LeGrand	42,874	48.35%
Libertarian	Kevin Terrett	1,791	2.02%
Total votes		88,675	100%
Republican hold			

==== District 11 ====
Incumbent Republican Lisa Stone Barnes, who has represented the 11th district since 2021, lost re-election to Democrat and former State Representative James Gailliard.

North Carolina Senate 11th district general election, 2026
Party	Candidate	Votes	%
Democratic	James Gailliard	45,634	51.46%
Republican	Lisa Stone Barnes (incumbent)	40,966	46.19%
Libertarian	Gavin Bell	2,085	2.35%
Total votes		88,685	100%
Democratic gain from Republican			

==== District 12 ====
Incumbent Republican Jim Burgin has represented the 12th district since 2019.

North Carolina Senate 12th district Democratic primary election, 2026
Party	Candidate	Votes	%
Democratic	Tanya White Anderson	6,498	67.59%
Democratic	Jheri Hardaway	3,116	32.41%
Total votes		9,614	100%

North Carolina Senate 12th district Republican primary election, 2026
Party	Candidate	Votes	%
Republican	Jim Burgin (incumbent)	7,933	76.19%
Republican	Tim McNeill	2,479	23.81%
Total votes		10,412	100%

North Carolina Senate 12th district general election, 2026
Party	Candidate	Votes	%
Republican	Jim Burgin (incumbent)	35,025	51.72%
Democratic	Tanya White Anderson	32,695	48.28%
Total votes		67,720	100%
Republican hold			

==== District 13 ====
Incumbent Democrat Lisa Grafstein has represented the 13th district since 2023.

North Carolina Senate 13th district general election, 2026
Party	Candidate	Votes	%
Democratic	Lisa Grafstein (incumbent)	63,972	60.80%
Republican	Robert van Brederode	41,253	39.20%
Total votes		105,225	100%
Democratic hold			

==== District 14 ====
Incumbent Democrat Dan Blue has represented the 14th district since 2009.

North Carolina Senate 14th district general election, 2026
Party	Candidate	Votes	%
Democratic	Dan Blue (incumbent)	68,329	82.02%
Republican	Angela McCarty	14,974	17.98%
Total votes		83,303	100%
Democratic hold			

==== District 15 ====
Incumbent Democrat Jay Chaudhuri has represented the 15th district and its predecessors since 2016.

North Carolina Senate district general election, 2026
Party	Candidate	Votes	%
Democratic	Jay Chaudhuri (incumbent)	61,597	75.11%
Republican	David Bankert	20,422	24.89%
Total votes		82,019	100%
Democratic hold			

==== District 16 ====
Incumbent Democrat Gale Adcock has represented the 16th district since 2023. On October 27, Libertarian candidate Jonathan Miller was arrested after an armed standoff with police at his apartment.

North Carolina Senate 16th district general election, 2026
Party	Candidate	Votes	%
Democratic	Gale Adcock (incumbent)	66,849	74.60%
Republican	Philip Hensley	21,001	23.43%
Libertarian	Jonathan Miller	1,765	1.97%
Total votes		89,615	100%
Democratic hold			

==== District 17 ====
Incumbent Democrat and Minority Leader Sydney Batch has represented the 17th district since 2021.

North Carolina Senate 17th district Republican primary election, 2026
Party	Candidate	Votes	%
Republican	Shirley Johnson	4,331	90.10%
Republican	Sarah Al-Baghdadi	476	9.90%
Total votes		4,807	100%

North Carolina Senate 17th district general election, 2026
Party	Candidate	Votes	%
Democratic	Sydney Batch (incumbent)	61,775	72.70%
Republican	Shirley Johnson	21,424	25.21%
Libertarian	Patrick Bowersox	1,769	2.08%
Total votes		84,968	100%
Democratic hold			

==== District 18 ====
Incumbent Democrat Haseeb Fatmi has represented the 18th district since his appointment in 2026.

North Carolina Senate 18th district Republican primary election, 2026
Party	Candidate	Votes	%
Republican	Chris Stock	7,636	60.56%
Republican	Cheryl Caulfield	4,972	39.44%
Total votes		12,608	100%

North Carolina Senate 18th district general election, 2026
Party	Candidate	Votes	%
Democratic	Haseeb Fatmi (incumbent)	54,360	54.81%
Republican	Chris Stock	42,402	42.76%
Libertarian	Brad Hessel	2,412	2.43%
Total votes		99,174	100%
Democratic hold			

==== District 19 ====
Incumbent Democrat Val Applewhite has represented the 19th district since 2023.

North Carolina Senate 19th district general election, 2026
Party	Candidate	Votes	%
Democratic	Val Applewhite (incumbent)	45,711	73.59%
Republican	Venus de la Cruz	16,403	26.41%
Total votes		62,114	100%
Democratic hold			

==== District 20 ====
Incumbent Democrat Natalie Murdock has represented the 20th district since 2020.

North Carolina Senate 20th district general election, 2026
Party	Candidate	Votes	%
Democratic	Natalie Murdock (incumbent)	85,783	100%
Total votes		85,783	100%
Democratic hold			

==== District 21 ====
Incumbent Republican Tom McInnis has represented the 21st district and its predecessors since 2015.

North Carolina Senate 21st district Republican primary election, 2026
Party	Candidate	Votes	%
Republican	Tom McInnis (incumbent)	11,564	73.29%
Republican	Ray Daly	4,214	26.71%
Total votes		15,778	100%

North Carolina Senate 21st district general election, 2026
Party	Candidate	Votes	%
Republican	Tom McInnis (incumbent)	42,089	54.37%
Democratic	Paul Taylor	35,329	45.63%
Total votes		77,418	100%
Republican hold			

==== District 22 ====
Incumbent Democrat Sophia Chitlik has represented the 22nd district since 2025.

North Carolina Senate 22nd district Democratic primary election, 2026
Party	Candidate	Votes	%
Democratic	Sophia Chitlik (incumbent)	22,739	65.52%
Democratic	DeDreana Freeman	11,968	34.48%
Total votes		34,707	100%

North Carolina Senate 22nd district general election, 2026
Party	Candidate	Votes	%
Democratic	Sophia Chitlik (incumbent)	73,404	85.25%
Republican	Lakeshia Alston	12,701	14.75%
Total votes		86,105	100%
Democratic hold			

==== District 23 ====
Incumbent Democrat Jonah Garson has represented the 23rd district since being appointed to the seat in April 2026 to succeed Graig Meyer, who resigned to become executive director of the North Carolina Justice Center.

North Carolina Senate 23rd district general election, 2026
Party	Candidate	Votes	%
Democratic	Jonah Garson (incumbent)	69,464	72.57%
Republican	Laura Pichardo	26,259	27.43%
Total votes		95,723	100%
Democratic hold			

==== District 24 ====
Incumbent Republican Danny Britt ran for re-election. He faced Democrat Catina Hamm, and is currently leading by roughly 250 votes. The district became notable as, due to the national blue wave, state Democrats flipped the State House and flipped four seats in the State Senate. Due to the close margin in this district, a flip to the Democratic Party would have resulted in a tie, giving the Lieutenant Governor, Democrat Rachel Hunt a tie-breaking vote and thus a trifecta.

Results by precinct: Britt: 50–60%; 60–70%; 70–80%; 80–90%; Hamm: 50–60%; 60–70%; 70–80%; >90%

North Carolina Senate 24th district general election, 2026
Party	Candidate	Votes	%
Republican	Danny Britt (incumbent)	28,055	50.20%
Democratic	Catina Hamm	27,830	49.80%
Total votes		55,885	100%
Republican hold			

==== District 25 ====
Incumbent Republican Amy Galey has represented the 25th district and its predecessors since 2021.

North Carolina Senate 25th district general election, 2026
Party	Candidate	Votes	%
Republican	Amy Galey (incumbent)	42,774	51.49%
Democratic	Southey Blanton	40,304	48.51%
Total votes		83,078	100%
Republican hold			

=== Districts 26–50 ===
==== District 26 ====
Incumbent Republican President pro tempore Phil Berger has represented the 26th district and its predecessors since 2001. Rockingham County Sheriff Sam Page defeated Senator Berger. Berger conceded the election on March 24, 2026 after the race went into a recount. Page went on to win the general election.

North Carolina Senate 26th district Republican primary election, 2026
Party	Candidate	Votes	%
Republican	Sam Page	13,135	50.04%
Republican	Phil Berger (incumbent)	13,112	49.96%
Total votes		26,247	100%

North Carolina Senate 26th district general election, 2026
Party	Candidate	Votes	%
Republican	Sam Page	50,369	53.71%
Democratic	Steve Luking	43,410	46.29%
Total votes		93,779	100%
Republican hold			

==== District 27 ====
Incumbent Democrat Michael Garrett has represented the 27th district since 2019.

North Carolina Senate 27th district general election, 2026
Party	Candidate	Votes	%
Democratic	Michael Garrett (incumbent)	61,401	100%
Total votes		61,401	100%
Democratic hold			

==== District 28 ====
Incumbent Democrat Gladys Robinson has represented the 28th district since 2011.

North Carolina Senate 28th district general election, 2026
Party	Candidate	Votes	%
Democratic	Gladys Robinson (incumbent)	61,383	100%
Total votes		61,383	100%
Democratic hold			

==== District 29 ====
Incumbent Republican Dave Craven has represented the 29th district and its predecessors since 2020.

North Carolina Senate 29th district general election, 2026
Party	Candidate	Votes	%
Republican	Dave Craven (incumbent)	43,275	60.92%
Democratic	Judy Little	27,766	39.08%
Total votes		71,041	100%
Republican hold			

==== District 30 ====
Incumbent Republican Steve Jarvis has represented the 30th district and its predecessors since 2021.

North Carolina Senate 30th district Republican primary election, 2026
Party	Candidate	Votes	%
Republican	Steve Jarvis (incumbent)	15,407	75.54%
Republican	Eddie Gallimore	4,989	24.46%
Total votes		20,396	100%

North Carolina Senate 30th district general election, 2026
Party	Candidate	Votes	%
Republican	Steve Jarvis (incumbent)	52,335	66.08%
Democratic	Pamela McAfee	26,869	33.92%
Total votes		79,204	100%
Republican hold			

==== District 31 ====
Incumbent Republican Dana Caudill Jones has represented the 31st district since 2024.

North Carolina Senate 31st district general election, 2026
Party	Candidate	Votes	%
Republican	Dana Caudill Jones (incumbent)	50,134	53.64%
Democratic	Andy Bowline	43,338	46.36%
Total votes		93,472	100%
Republican hold			

==== District 32 ====
Incumbent Democrat Paul Lowe Jr. has represented the 32nd district since 2015.

North Carolina Senate 32nd district Democratic primary election, 2026
Party	Candidate	Votes	%
Democratic	Paul Lowe Jr. (incumbent)	11,876	59.07%
Democratic	Gardenia Henley	8,228	40.93%
Total votes		20,104	100%

North Carolina Senate 32nd district general election, 2026
Party	Candidate	Votes	%
Democratic	Paul Lowe Jr. (incumbent)	57,567	75.96%
Republican	Peter Antinozzi	16,840	22.22%
Green	Keenan Altic	1,377	1.82%
Total votes		75,784	100%
Democratic hold			

==== District 33 ====
Incumbent Republican Carl Ford has represented the 33rd district since 2019.

North Carolina Senate 33rd district general election, 2026
Party	Candidate	Votes	%
Republican	Carl Ford (incumbent)	46,878	62.41%
Democratic	Gary Weart	28,229	37.59%
Total votes		75,107	100%
Republican hold			

==== District 34 ====
Incumbent Republican Chris Measmer, who had represented the 34th district since his appointment in 2025, lost the Republican nomination to former State Representative Kevin Crutchfield. Democrat April Cook defeated Crutchfield in the general election.

North Carolina Senate 34th district Republican primary election, 2026
Party	Candidate	Votes	%
Republican	Kevin Crutchfield	7,498	53.67%
Republican	Chris Measmer (incumbent)	6,473	46.33%
Total votes		13,971	100%

North Carolina Senate 34th district general election, 2026
Party	Candidate	Votes	%
Democratic	April Cook	47,029	57.73%
Republican	Kevin Crutchfield	34,432	42.27%
Total votes		81,461	100%
Democratic gain from Republican			

==== District 35 ====
Incumbent Republican Todd Johnson has represented the 35th district since 2019.

North Carolina Senate 35th district general election, 2026
Party	Candidate	Votes	%
Republican	Todd Johnson (incumbent)	52,239	53.99%
Democratic	Christine Winward	44,511	46.01%
Total votes		96,750	100%
Republican hold			

==== District 36 ====
Incumbent Republican Eddie Settle has represented the 36th district since 2023.

North Carolina Senate 36th district general election, 2026
Party	Candidate	Votes	%
Republican	Eddie Settle (incumbent)	54,239	72.85%
Democratic	Trevor Cole Hardwick	20,219	27.15%
Total votes		74,458	100%
Republican hold			

==== District 37 ====
Incumbent Republican Vickie Sawyer has represented the 37th district and its predecessors since 2019.

North Carolina Senate 37th district Democratic primary election, 2026
Party	Candidate	Votes	%
Democratic	Raygan Angel	5,632	62.47%
Democratic	Precinda Bjorgen	3,384	37.53%
Total votes		9,016	100%

North Carolina Senate 37th district general election, 2026
Party	Candidate	Votes	%
Republican	Vickie Sawyer (incumbent)	51,818	56.61%
Democratic	Raygan Angel	39,719	43.39%
Total votes		91,537	100%
Republican hold			

==== District 38 ====
Incumbent Democrat Mujtaba Mohammed has represented the 38th district since 2019.

North Carolina Senate 38th district general election, 2026
Party	Candidate	Votes	%
Democratic	Mujtaba Mohammed (incumbent)	75,320	100%
Total votes		75,320	100%
Democratic hold			

==== District 39 ====
Incumbent Democrat DeAndrea Salvador has represented the 39th district since 2021.

North Carolina Senate 39th district general election, 2026
Party	Candidate	Votes	%
Democratic	DeAndrea Salvador (incumbent)	69,754	100%
Total votes		69,754	100%
Democratic hold			

==== District 40 ====
Incumbent Democrat Joyce Waddell has represented the 40th district since 2015.

North Carolina Senate 40th district general election, 2026
Party	Candidate	Votes	%
Democratic	Joyce Waddell (incumbent)	57,230	83.58%
Republican	Bobbie Shields	11,242	16.42%
Total votes		68,472	100%
Democratic hold			

==== District 41 ====
Incumbent Democrat Caleb Theodros has represented the 41st district since 2025.

North Carolina Senate 41st district general election, 2026
Party	Candidate	Votes	%
Democratic	Caleb Theodros (incumbent)	70,084	84.56%
Republican	Kevin Gray	12,797	15.44%
Total votes		82,881	100%
Democratic hold			

==== District 42 ====
Incumbent Democrat Woodson Bradley has represented the 42nd district since 2025.

North Carolina Senate 42nd district general election, 2026
Party	Candidate	Votes	%
Democratic	Woodson Bradley (incumbent)	57,296	58.88%
Republican	Stacie McGinn	40,008	41.12%
Total votes		97,304	100%
Democratic hold			

==== District 43 ====
Incumbent Republican Brad Overcash has represented the 43rd district since 2023.

Results by precinct: Overcash: 50–60%; 60–70%; 70–80%; Rutherford: 50–60%; 60–70%; 70–80%; 80-90%

North Carolina Senate 43rd district general election, 2026
Party	Candidate	Votes	%
Republican	Brad Overcash (incumbent)	39,263	50.87%
Democratic	Steve Rutherford	37,925	49.13%
Total votes		77,188	100%
Republican hold			

==== District 44 ====
Incumbent Republican Ted Alexander has represented the 44th district since 2019.

North Carolina Senate 44th district general election, 2026
Party	Candidate	Votes	%
Republican	Ted Alexander (incumbent)	50,426	64.39%
Democratic	Rod Powell	27,884	35.61%
Total votes		78,310	100%
Republican hold			

==== District 45 ====
Incumbent Republican Mark Hollo has represented the 45th district since 2025.

North Carolina Senate 45th district general election, 2026
Party	Candidate	Votes	%
Republican	Mark Hollo (incumbent)	49,160	62.73%
Democratic	Greg Cranford	29,207	37.27%
Total votes		78,367	100%
Republican hold			

==== District 46 ====
Incumbent Republican Warren Daniel has represented the 46th district and its predecessors since 2011.

North Carolina Senate 46th district general election, 2026
Party	Candidate	Votes	%
Republican	Warren Daniel (incumbent)	42,754	56.15%
Democratic	Kyle Whisnant	33,388	43.85%
Total votes		76,142	100%
Republican hold			

==== District 47 ====
Incumbent Republican Ralph Hise has represented the 47th district since 2011.

North Carolina Senate 47th district general election, 2026
Party	Candidate	Votes	%
Republican	Ralph Hise (incumbent)	48,754	55.49%
Democratic	Frank Patton Hughes III	39,099	44.51%
Total votes		87,853	100%
Republican hold			

==== District 48 ====
Incumbent Republican Tim Moffitt has represented the 48th district since 2023.

North Carolina Senate 48th district general election, 2026
Party	Candidate	Votes	%
Republican	Tim Moffitt (incumbent)	49,460	55.21%
Democratic	Doyle Brown Jr.	40,120	44.79%
Total votes		89,580	100%
Republican hold			

==== District 49 ====
Incumbent Democrat Julie Mayfield has represented the 49th district since 2021.

North Carolina Senate 49th district general election, 2026
Party	Candidate	Votes	%
Democratic	Julie Mayfield (incumbent)	77,461	77.15%
Republican	CJ Domingo	22,946	22.85%
Total votes		100,407	100%
Democratic hold			

==== District 50 ====
Incumbent Republican Kevin Corbin has represented the 50th district since 2021.

North Carolina Senate 50th district general election, 2026
Party	Candidate	Votes	%
Republican	Kevin Corbin (incumbent)	55,526	58.17%
Democratic	Tom Downing	39,924	41.83%
Total votes		95,450	100%
Republican hold			

== See also ==
- 2026 North Carolina elections
- 2026 North Carolina House of Representatives election
- List of North Carolina state legislatures
