= April Cook =

American politician

Member-elect of the North Carolina Senate from the 34th district
- Assuming office January 1, 2027
- Succeeding: Chris Measmer

Personal details
- Born: 1963 or 1964 (age 62–63)
- Party: Democratic
- Education: North Carolina State University; Meredith College (MBA)
- Occupation: Nonprofit health care executive
- Website: Campaign website

April Cook (born 1963 or 1964) is an American nonprofit healthcare executive and politician who is a member-elect of the North Carolina Senate from the 34th district. A Democrat, she defeated Republican Kevin Crutchfield in the 2026 election.

== Career ==
Cook is a fourth-generation North Carolinian who has lived in Concord for more than 30 years. She studied business at North Carolina State University and earned a Master of Business Administration degree from Meredith College. She co-founded a free health clinic for uninsured patients, and led it as executive director for more than two decades. Since 2022, she has been chief executive of a statewide association of free and charitable clinics.

== Political career ==
Senate Democrats recruited Cook to run for the 34th district in Cabarrus County because of her background in healthcare. Expanding access to affordable health care was her top campaign issue, along with public school funding, teacher pay, housing and child care costs, and access to reproductive healthcare. Crutchfield, a former state representative, had defeated incumbent Chris Measmer in the Republican primary and faced Cook in the general election. Cook won with 46,750 votes (57.66 percent) to Crutchfield's 34,328 (42.34 percent).

== Electoral history ==
=== 2026 ===
North Carolina Senate 34th district general election, 2026
Party	Candidate	Votes	%
Democratic	April Cook	46,750	57.66%
Republican	Kevin Crutchfield	34,328	42.34%
Total votes		81,078	100%
Democratic gain from Republican			

North Carolina Senate
Preceded by Chris Measmer	Member-elect of the North Carolina Senate from the 34th district Taking office January 1, 2027	Succeeded by TBD
