= Eddie Knox =

American politician (1937–2026)

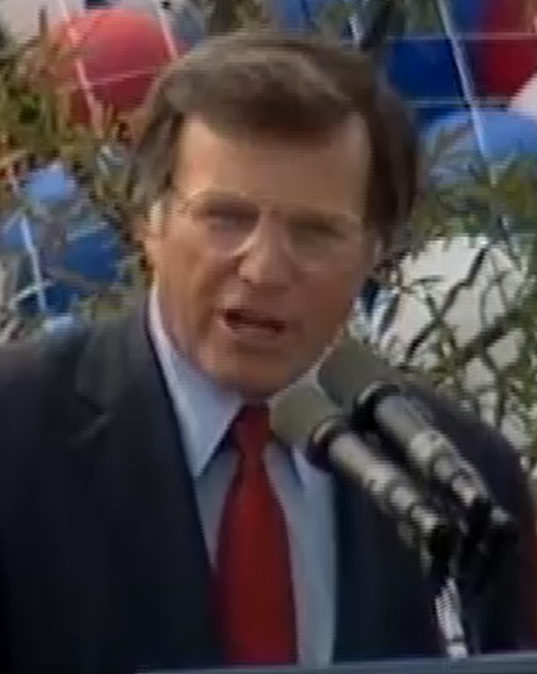
- Knox in 1984

49th Mayor of Charlotte
- In office 1979–1983
- Preceded by: Kenneth R. Harris
- Succeeded by: Harvey Gantt

Member of the North Carolina Senate
- In office 1971–1975
- Preceded by: Martha Evans
- Constituency: 27th district (1971–1973); 22nd district (1973–1975)

Personal details
- Born: Haden Edward Knox; January 22, 1937 near Davidson, North Carolina, U.S.
- Died: June 22, 2026 (aged 89)
- Party: Republican (from 1984)
- Other political affiliations: Democratic (until 1984)
- Spouses: Beverly Blythe (m. 1957; div. 1977) Frances Hinson (m. 1977)
- Children: 3
- Education: North Carolina State University; Wake Forest University
- Occupation: Politician; lawyer

Haden Edward Knox (January 22, 1937 – June 22, 2026) was an American politician and lawyer who served as a member of the North Carolina Senate from 1971 to 1975. He later served as the mayor of Charlotte, North Carolina, from 1979 until 1983.

== Early life and education ==
Haden Edward Knox was born on January 22, 1937, at his family's home near Davidson, Mecklenburg County, North Carolina, as one of eight children to Annie (née Barkley) and Ralph Brevard Knox. He grew up on his father's 106 acres (43 ha) cotton farm. His father died in 1955.

He graduated from North Mecklenburg High School, then obtained his degree from North Carolina State University in 1960, where he was vice president and then president of North Carolina State University's student body. While in college, he worked at Barger Construction Company.

He graduated with a law degree from Wake Forest University School of Law in 1963. He was a president of Wake Forest's Student Bar Association from 1962 to 1963. In 1963, he was admitted to the bar in North Carolina.

== Career ==
=== Legal career ===
Knox joined the Pierce, Wardlow, Knox and Caudle law firm (later named the Wardlow, Knox, Caudle and Wade law firm before being renamed Wardlow, Knox, Caudle and Knox and later Wardlow, Knox, Caudle and Ward) of Charlotte.

By 1986, the firm was known as Wardlow, Knox, Knox, Freeman and Scofield. Knox continued to work as a lawyer and was associated with the Knox Law Center (earlier the Knox, Brotherton, Knox and Godfrey firm).

=== Election campaigns ===
In 1964, Knox was named as a head of Dan K. Moore's gubernatorial campaign's young voters' program. He later managed the campaign of Mecklenburg County solicitor Elliott M. Schwartz.

In 1969, he was the campaign manager of J. Melville Broughton Jr., son of Governor J. Melville Broughton. He chaired the successful gubernatorial campaign of Jim Hunt in 1976. He was appointed by Hunt to the advisory budget committee and later served as its chairman.

== Government service ==
Knox was chairman of the Charlotte-Mecklenburg water expansion team. He was chairman of the North Carolina commission on correctional programs. He was co-chairman of the committee to reduce state statutes for the Governor Morehead School and the North Carolina School for the Deaf. He became a board member of both schools.

In 1967, Knox was appointed by Governor Moore as a member of North Carolina's ABC Board. He resigned from the board in January 1970.

=== Political career ===
Knox defeated incumbent Martha Evans in the Democratic primary for the North Carolina Senate in 1970 and ran unopposed and won the 27th district seat in November 1970. In November 1972, he was re-elected to the North Carolina Senate, defeating Michael Mullins, for the 22nd district seat. In 1971 and 1973, he advocated for legislation to use profits from liquor sales to treat alcoholics.

In 1974, he did not seek re-election to the state senate. He then served on the Knox Commission, a commission named after himself focused on sentencing, criminal punishment, and rehabilitation in the state. In 1977, the commission called for single cell construction, making criminal sentences more uniform, and restricting parole. This led to the Fair Sentencing Act in 1979. The legislature did not restrict paroles, but loosened paroles, after the commission's recommendation.

He served as mayor of Charlotte from 1979 to 1983. In 1981, he broke a 5–5 tie by the city council to keep a residency rule in place for Charlotte city employees. In January 1982, he established the Charlotte Safety Action Committee. That same year he led a drive to raise donations to fund the Charlotte-Mecklenburg Crime Stoppers, a 24-hour hotline.

In January 1983, he created a 100-member committee called the "Committee of 100" to study the need for the Charlotte Coliseum (later the Bojangles Coliseum). This effort followed a rejection by voters in 1981 of a bond issue of $1.5 million to buy land.

Knox ran for governor in 1984, but was defeated in the Democratic primary by Rufus Edmisten. Knox stated that his loss could be attributed to "the Mecklenburg thing", arguing that his Mecklenburg background hurt his gubernatorial candidacy.

In 1984, he switched from the Democratic to the Republican Party. In 1986, he was appointed by Governor James G. Martin as chairman of the Governor's Task Force on Racial, Religious and Ethnic Violence and Intimidation. He was reappointed as chairman of the committee in 1988.

== Golf ==
Knox was owner and developer of the Verdict Ridge Golf and Country Club in Denver, North Carolina, starting in 1998. He served on the board of visitors of Wake Forest University School of Law.

== Personal life and death ==
Knox married Beverly Ann Blythe of Huntersville on August 2, 1957. They had three children. He separated from his wife for a number of years and they divorced in January 1977. He married Frances Stegall Hinson on February 12, 1977.

His brother Joe was mayor of Mooresville. His brother Russell and his nephew Rusty Knox were mayors of Davidson.

He was a member of the Sardis Presbyterian Church in Charlotte. He was later a member of the Bethel Presbyterian Church in Cornelius. In the 1970s, he lived on Carmel Valley Drive and Canyon Trail in Charlotte. In 1988, he bought 6 acres (2.4 ha) of lake land from the town of Davidson for $1.2 million. He was an avid golfer.

Knox died on June 22, 2026, at the age of 89.

== Awards ==
In 1969, Knox was awarded the State Jaycees' annual "Outstanding Young Men" award. He was also a recipient of the Mecklenburg County Distinguished Citizen Award and the Young Alumni Award of North Carolina State University.

In 2008, Knox was inducted into the General Practice Hall of Fame by the North Carolina Bar Association. In 2024, a plaque was dedicated to Knox by a business in his former office.

Preceded by Kenneth R. Harris	Mayor of Charlotte, NC; 1979–1983	Succeeded by Harvey Gantt (D)
