= North Carolina's 22nd Senate district =

American legislative district

North Carolina's 22nd State Senate district
Senator
| Sophia Chitlik; D–Durham |
- Demographics: 42% White; 31% Black; 17% Hispanic; 5% Asian; 5% Multiracial
- Population (2023): 202,293

North Carolina's 22nd Senate district is one of 50 districts in the North Carolina Senate. It has been represented by Democrat Sophia Chitlik since 2025.

== Geography ==
Since 2023, the district has included part of Durham County. The district overlaps with the 2nd, 29th, 30th, and 31st state house districts.

== District officeholders since 1973 ==
=== Multi-member district ===
| Senator | Party | Dates | Notes | Senator | Party | Dates | Notes | Senator | Party | Dates | Notes | Senator | Party | Dates | Notes | Counties |
|---|---|---|---|---|---|---|---|---|---|---|---|---|---|---|---|---|
| Cy Bahakel (Matthews) | Democratic | January 1, 1973 – January 1, 1977 | | Eddie Knox (Charlotte) | Democratic | January 1, 1973 – January 1, 1975 | Redistricted from the 27th district. | Herman Moore (Charlotte) | Democratic | January 1, 1973 – January 1, 1977 | Redistricted from the 27th district. | Michael Mullins (Charlotte) | Republican | January 1, 1973 – January 1, 1975 | | 1973–1985; All of Cabarrus and Mecklenburg Counties. |
| Cy Bahakel (Matthews) | Democratic | January 1, 1973 – January 1, 1977 | | Fred Alexander (Charlotte) | Democratic | January 1, 1975 – January 1, 1981 | | Herman Moore (Charlotte) | Democratic | January 1, 1973 – January 1, 1977 | Redistricted from the 27th district. | Jim McDuffie (Charlotte) | Democratic | January 1, 1975 – January 1, 1979 | | 1973–1985; All of Cabarrus and Mecklenburg Counties. |
| Craig Lawing (Charlotte) | Democratic | January 1, 1977 – January 1, 1985 | | Fred Alexander (Charlotte) | Democratic | January 1, 1975 – January 1, 1981 | | Carolyn Mathis (Charlotte) | Republican | January 1, 1977 – January 1, 1983 | | Jim McDuffie (Charlotte) | Democratic | January 1, 1975 – January 1, 1979 | | 1973–1985; All of Cabarrus and Mecklenburg Counties. |
| Craig Lawing (Charlotte) | Democratic | January 1, 1977 – January 1, 1985 | | Fred Alexander (Charlotte) | Democratic | January 1, 1975 – January 1, 1981 | | Carolyn Mathis (Charlotte) | Republican | January 1, 1977 – January 1, 1983 | | Cecil Jenkins Jr. (Kannapolis) | Democratic | January 1, 1979 – January 1, 1985 | | 1973–1985; All of Cabarrus and Mecklenburg Counties. |
| Craig Lawing (Charlotte) | Democratic | January 1, 1977 – January 1, 1985 | | Jim McDuffie (Charlotte) | Democratic | January 1, 1981 – January 1, 1983 | | Carolyn Mathis (Charlotte) | Republican | January 1, 1977 – January 1, 1983 | | Cecil Jenkins Jr. (Kannapolis) | Democratic | January 1, 1979 – January 1, 1985 | | 1973–1985; All of Cabarrus and Mecklenburg Counties. |
| Craig Lawing (Charlotte) | Democratic | January 1, 1977 – January 1, 1985 | | Benjamin Tison (Charlotte) | Democratic | January 1, 1983 – January 1, 1985 | | Kenneth Harris (Charlotte) | Republican | January 1, 1983 – January 1, 1985 | | Cecil Jenkins Jr. (Kannapolis) | Democratic | January 1, 1979 – January 1, 1985 | | 1973–1985; All of Cabarrus and Mecklenburg Counties. |

=== Single-member district ===
| Senator | Party | Dates | Notes | Counties |
|---|---|---|---|---|
| James Johnson Jr. (Concord) | Republican | January 1, 1985 – January 1, 1991 | | 1985–1993; All of Cabarrus County. Part of Mecklenburg County. |
| Fletcher Hartsell Jr. (Concord) | Republican | January 1, 1991 – January 1, 2003 | Redistricted to the 36th district. | 1985–1993; All of Cabarrus County. Part of Mecklenburg County. |
| Fletcher Hartsell Jr. (Concord) | Republican | January 1, 1991 – January 1, 2003 | Redistricted to the 36th district. | 1993–2003; All of Cabarrus County. Parts of Rowan and Stanly counties. |
| Harris Blake (Pinehurst) | Republican | January 1, 2003 – January 1, 2013 | Redistricted to the 29th district and retired. | 2003–2005; All of Moore and Lee counties. Part of Harnett County. |
| Harris Blake (Pinehurst) | Republican | January 1, 2003 – January 1, 2013 | Redistricted to the 29th district and retired. | 2005–2013; All of Moore and Harnett counties. |
| Mike Woodard (Durham) | Democratic | January 1, 2013 – January 1, 2025 | Lost re-nomination. | 2013–2019; All of Caswell and Person counties. Part of Durham County. |
| Mike Woodard (Durham) | Democratic | January 1, 2013 – January 1, 2025 | Lost re-nomination. | 2019–2023; All of Granville and Person counties. Part of Durham County. |
| Mike Woodard (Durham) | Democratic | January 1, 2013 – January 1, 2025 | Lost re-nomination. | 2023–Present; Part of Durham County. |
| Sophia Chitlik (Durham) | Democratic | January 1, 2025 – Present | | 2023–Present; Part of Durham County. |

== Election results ==
=== 2024 ===
North Carolina Senate 22nd district Democratic primary election, 2024
| Party | Candidate | Votes | % |
|---|---|---|---|
| Democratic | Sophia Chitlik | 17,270 | 57.59% |
| Democratic | Mike Woodard (incumbent) | 12,719 | 42.41% |
| Total votes | | 29,989 | 100% |

North Carolina Senate 22nd district general election, 2024
| Party | Candidate | Votes | % |
|---|---|---|---|
| Democratic | Sophia Chitlik | 83,844 | 85.98% |
| Libertarian | Ray Ubinger | 13,674 | 14.02% |
| Total votes | | 97,518 | 100% |
| Democratic hold | | | |

=== 2022 ===
North Carolina Senate 22nd district Republican primary election, 2022
| Party | Candidate | Votes | % |
|---|---|---|---|
| Republican | Larry Coleman | 3,189 | 68.55% |
| Republican | John Tarantino | 1,463 | 31.45% |
| Total votes | | 4,652 | 100% |

North Carolina Senate 22nd district general election, 2022
| Party | Candidate | Votes | % |
|---|---|---|---|
| Democratic | Mike Woodard (incumbent) | 60,402 | 78.43% |
| Republican | Larry Coleman | 15,070 | 19.57% |
| Libertarian | Ray Ubinger | 1,543 | 2.00% |
| Total votes | | 77,015 | 100% |
| Democratic hold | | | |

=== 2020 ===
North Carolina Senate 22nd district general election, 2020
| Party | Candidate | Votes | % |
|---|---|---|---|
| Democratic | Mike Woodard (incumbent) | 60,402 | 58.43% |
| Republican | Rick Padgett | 39,792 | 38.50% |
| Libertarian | Ray Ubinger | 3,175 | 3.07% |
| Total votes | | 103,369 | 100% |
| Democratic hold | | | |

=== 2018 ===
North Carolina Senate 22nd district general election, 2018
| Party | Candidate | Votes | % |
|---|---|---|---|
| Democratic | Mike Woodard (incumbent) | 46,153 | 61.81% |
| Republican | Rickey "Rick" Padgett | 26,989 | 36.14% |
| Libertarian | Ray Ubinger | 1,527 | 2.05% |
| Total votes | | 74,669 | 100% |
| Democratic hold | | | |

=== 2016 ===
North Carolina Senate 22nd district general election, 2016
| Party | Candidate | Votes | % |
|---|---|---|---|
| Democratic | Mike Woodard (incumbent) | 74,693 | 65.58% |
| Republican | T. Greg Doucette | 39,198 | 34.42% |
| Total votes | | 113,891 | 100% |
| Democratic hold | | | |

=== 2014 ===
North Carolina Senate 22nd district Republican primary election, 2014
| Party | Candidate | Votes | % |
|---|---|---|---|
| Republican | Milton Holmes | 2,557 | 51.97% |
| Republican | Herman Joubert | 2,363 | 48.03% |
| Total votes | | 4,920 | 100% |

North Carolina Senate 22nd district general election, 2014
| Party | Candidate | Votes | % |
|---|---|---|---|
| Democratic | Mike Woodard (incumbent) | 47,978 | 67.13% |
| Republican | Herman Joubert | 23,491 | 32.87% |
| Total votes | | 71,469 | 100% |
| Democratic hold | | | |

=== 2012 ===
North Carolina Senate 22nd district Democratic primary election, 2012
| Party | Candidate | Votes | % |
|---|---|---|---|
| Democratic | Mike Woodard | 22,356 | 67.79% |
| Democratic | Kerry Sutton | 10,621 | 32.21% |
| Total votes | | 32,977 | 100% |

North Carolina Senate 22nd district general election, 2012
| Party | Candidate | Votes | % |
|---|---|---|---|
| Democratic | Mike Woodard | 67,484 | 65.38% |
| Republican | Milton Holmes | 35,730 | 34.62% |
| Total votes | | 103,214 | 100% |
| Democratic win (new seat) | | | |

=== 2010 ===
North Carolina Senate 22nd district Republican primary election, 2010
| Party | Candidate | Votes | % |
|---|---|---|---|
| Republican | Harris Blake (incumbent) | 6,679 | 65.86% |
| Republican | Richard Morgan | 3,462 | 34.14% |
| Total votes | | 10,141 | 100% |

North Carolina Senate 22nd district general election, 2010
| Party | Candidate | Votes | % |
|---|---|---|---|
| Republican | Harris Blake (incumbent) | 38,331 | 100% |
| Total votes | | 38,331 | 100% |
| Republican hold | | | |

=== 2008 ===
North Carolina Senate 22nd district Republican primary election, 2008
| Party | Candidate | Votes | % |
|---|---|---|---|
| Republican | Harris Blake (incumbent) | 8,797 | 59.41% |
| Republican | Cindy Richardson Morgan | 6,010 | 40.59% |
| Total votes | | 14,807 | 100% |

North Carolina Senate 22nd district general election, 2008
| Party | Candidate | Votes | % |
|---|---|---|---|
| Republican | Harris Blake (incumbent) | 50,111 | 60.27% |
| Democratic | Abraham Oudeh | 33,033 | 39.73% |
| Total votes | | 83,144 | 100% |
| Republican hold | | | |

=== 2006 ===
North Carolina Senate 22nd district general election, 2006
| Party | Candidate | Votes | % |
|---|---|---|---|
| Republican | Harris Blake (incumbent) | 24,490 | 62.58% |
| Democratic | Abraham Oudeh | 14,644 | 37.42% |
| Total votes | | 39,134 | 100% |
| Republican hold | | | |

=== 2004 ===
North Carolina Senate 22nd district general election, 2004
| Party | Candidate | Votes | % |
|---|---|---|---|
| Republican | Harris Blake (incumbent) | 35,605 | 51.73% |
| Democratic | Oscar Harris | 33,229 | 48.27% |
| Total votes | | 68,834 | 100% |
| Republican hold | | | |

=== 2002 ===
North Carolina Senate 22nd district Democratic primary election, 2002
| Party | Candidate | Votes | % |
|---|---|---|---|
| Democratic | Jimmy Love Sr. | 6,690 | 62.17% |
| Democratic | Wanda H. Hunt | 4,071 | 37.83% |
| Total votes | | 10,761 | 100% |

North Carolina Senate 22nd district Republican primary election, 2002
| Party | Candidate | Votes | % |
|---|---|---|---|
| Republican | Harris Blake | 4,687 | 37.29% |
| Republican | Teena S. Little | 3,995 | 31.78% |
| Republican | Bobby Ray Hall | 1,963 | 15.62% |
| Republican | Tim McNeill | 1,925 | 15.31% |
| Total votes | | 12,570 | 100% |

North Carolina Senate 22nd district general election, 2002
| Party | Candidate | Votes | % |
|---|---|---|---|
| Republican | Harris Blake | 24,975 | 54.43% |
| Democratic | Jimmy Love Sr. | 20,072 | 43.74% |
| Libertarian | Jonathan Lubecky | 840 | 1.83% |
| Total votes | | 45,887 | 100% |
| Republican win (new seat) | | | |

=== 2000 ===
North Carolina Senate 22nd district Republican primary election, 2000
| Party | Candidate | Votes | % |
|---|---|---|---|
| Republican | Fletcher Hartsell Jr. (incumbent) | 5,273 | 77.82% |
| Republican | Glenn Harold Comer | 1,503 | 22.18% |
| Total votes | | 6,776 | 100% |

North Carolina Senate 22nd district general election, 2000
| Party | Candidate | Votes | % |
|---|---|---|---|
| Republican | Fletcher Hartsell Jr. (incumbent) | 48,592 | 100% |
| Total votes | | 48,592 | 100% |
| Republican hold | | | |
