= Jess Rivera =

American politician

Member-elect of the North Carolina Senate from the 4th district
- Assuming office January 1, 2027
- Succeeding: Buck Newton

Personal details
- Born: 1985 or 1986 (age 40–41) California, U.S.
- Party: Democratic
- Spouse: Kass Aitken
- Occupation: Barber, small business owner
- Website: Campaign website

Military service
- Allegiance: United States
- Branch/service: United States Marine Corps

Jessica "Jess" Rivera (born 1985 or 1986) is an American barber, Marine Corps veteran, and politician who is a member-elect of the North Carolina Senate from the 4th district. A Democrat, she defeated Republican incumbent Buck Newton in the 2026 election.

== Early life and career ==
Rivera was born in California, the oldest of six children, and helped her mother raise her siblings. She joined the Marine Corps at 17 and served for eight years, deploying to Iraq in 2005 and 2007. In 2007, she was selected for Task Force Lioness, a platoon of female Marines attached to infantry units for combat missions, and she earned a combat meritorious promotion.

She moved to eastern North Carolina after being stationed at Camp Lejeune. She opened a barbershop in downtown Wilson, where she and her wife, Kass Aitken, own a home.

== Political career ==
In her first run for office, Rivera challenged Newton in the 4th district, which covers Wilson, Wayne, and Greene counties. Her campaign focused on affordability and local control. She won with 37,539 votes (51.07 percent) to Newton's 35,962 (48.93 percent).

== Electoral history ==
=== 2026 ===
North Carolina Senate 4th district general election, 2026
Party	Candidate	Votes	%
Democratic	Jess Rivera	37,539	51.07%
Republican	Buck Newton (incumbent)	35,962	48.93%
Total votes		73,501	100%
Democratic gain from Republican			

North Carolina Senate
Preceded by Buck Newton	Member-elect of the North Carolina Senate from the 4th district Taking office January 1, 2027	Succeeded by TBD
