= Wilkes Community College =

College in Wilkesboro, North Carolina, US

Coordinates: 36.1425°N 81.1787°W

- Type: Public community college
- Established: 1964
- Parent institution: North Carolina Community College System
- President: Dr. Michael Rodgers
- Students: 2,558 (April 2024)
- Location: Wilkesboro, North Carolina, United States
- Campus: Urban
- Colors: Blue and green
- Nickname: WCC
- Mascot: Cougar
- Website: www.wilkescc.edu

Wilkes Community College (WCC) is a public community college in Wilkesboro, North Carolina. It is part of the North Carolina Community College System and serves northwest North Carolina, in Alleghany, Ashe, and Wilkes counties. The college is best known as the site of the annual MerleFest music festival.

The main campus located in Wilkes County is 152 acres and comprises 18 buildings. As of April 2024, there were 2,558 students enrolled. Wilkes Community College also has smaller satellite campuses in neighboring Alleghany and Ashe counties. WCC is accredited by the Southern Association of Colleges and Schools.

== History ==
In 1963, the North Carolina General Assembly passed the Community College Act, creating a system of comprehensive community colleges and technical institutes. In September 1964, Wilkes County citizens approved the establishment of a community college through a bond vote to allow for the construction of facilities and a tax authorization for the operation of the college. Wilkes Community College was founded in October 1964 by the North Carolina Board of Education. The first Board of Trustees was sworn into office on January 15, 1965, and classes were first held in August 1965. The student enrollment for the college's first year was 68. The college's campus originally covered 75 acres and included three buildings; Thompson, Hayes, and Lovette halls.

The first president of WCC was Dr. Howard Thompson, who served from March 5, 1965, to June 30, 1977. He was followed by Dr. David E. Daniel, July 1, 1977 to April 2, 1989; Dr. H. Edwin Beam, interim president, April 3, 1989 to July 16, 1989; Dr. James R. Randolph, July 17, 1989 to July 7, 1995; Dr. Swanson Richards, interim president, July 8, 1995 to February 29, 1996; Dr. Gordon G. Burns, Jr., March 3, 1996 to June 1, 2014; Morgan Francis, interim president, June 2, 2014 to June 30, 2014; and Dr. Jeffrey Alan Cox, July 1, 2014 to June 1, 2023.

Dr. Michael Rodgers is the current president of WCC, serving since June 1, 2024.

== MerleFest ==
In 1988, Grammy-winning guitarist Doc Watson, WCC horticulture instructor B. Townes, and local businessman and musician Bill Young started the MerleFest music festival on the campus of Wilkes Community College. Named in honor of Doc's late son Merle Watson, MerleFest has grown into one of the largest bluegrass and folk music festivals in the United States, drawing nearly 80,000 music fans each year. The festival has become the primary fundraiser for Wilkes Community College, and has brought national publicity to the college.

== Notable alumni ==
- Zach Galifianakis, actor and comedian
- Eddie Settle, member of the North Carolina State Senate
