= Fletcher L. Hartsell Jr. =

Disgraced American politician

Senator Fletcher L. Hartsell Jr.
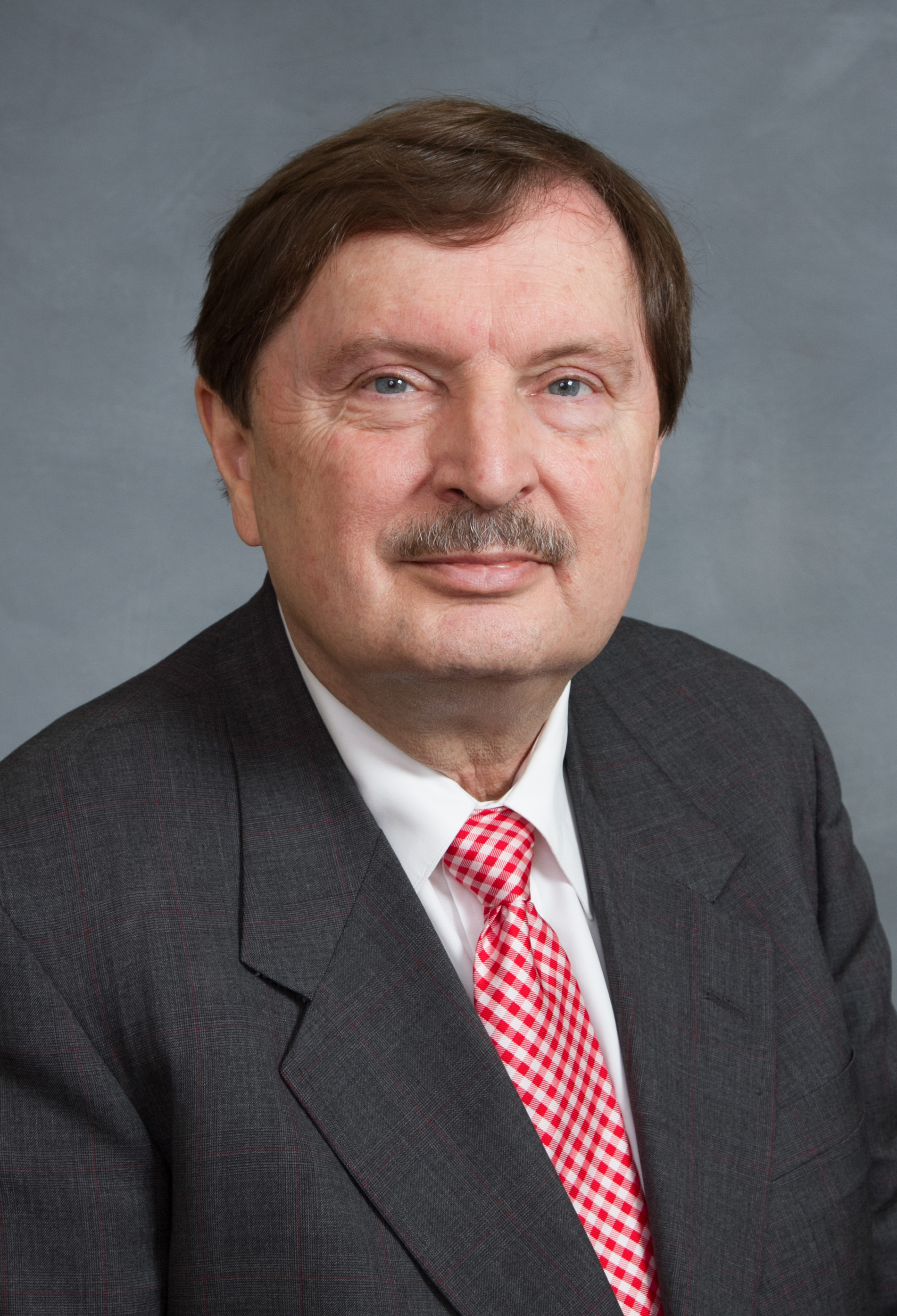

Member of the North Carolina Senate
- In office January 1, 1991 – January 1, 2017
- Preceded by: James Calvin Johnson, Jr.
- Succeeded by: Paul Newton
- Constituency: 22nd District (1991-2003); 36th District (2003-2017)

Personal details
- Born: February 15, 1947 (age 79) Concord, North Carolina, U.S.
- Party: Republican
- Spouse: Tana
- Children: 3
- Education: Davidson College (AB); University of North Carolina, Chapel Hill (JD)
- Occupation: Attorney Disbarred

Fletcher L. Hartsell Jr. (born February 15, 1947) was a Republican member of the North Carolina General Assembly until he admitted to misappropriating over $200,000 in campaign donations. On May 16, 2017, he was sentenced in Federal Court in Winston-Salem, NC, to eight months in Federal prison. He represented the state's thirty-sixth North Carolina Senate district, including constituents in Cabarrus and Union counties. An attorney from Concord, North Carolina, Hartsell served in the state Senate from 1991 until 2017.

== Early life and education ==
Fletcher Hartsell was born on February 15, 1947, in Concord, North Carolina. Hartsell is the son of Doris W. Hartsell and the late Fletcher L. Hartsell Sr. of Concord. His father worked at Cannon Mills.

Following his graduation from Concord High School (North Carolina), Hartsell attended Davidson College where he earned an AB in Political Science in 1969. He served as Second Vice President in the Student Government Association.

Following his undergraduate studies at Davidson, Hartsell went on to study at Univ. of North Carolina School of Law where he obtained his J.D. degree. He made Dean's List and served as a Research Assistant to Professor Laurens Walker and Contributor to work on the December 1972 Harvard Law Review article "Adversary Presentation and Bias in Legal Decision Making."

Hartsell is an active alumnus having served on the Board of Visitors (1998–2002) and the General Alumni Association. He is currently a regional representative to the Law Alumni association.

== Career ==
Fletcher Hartsell currently serves as President of Hartsell & Williams, P.A. in Concord, NC. He has been employed there since 1972. Notable service during his legal career includes the following:

- Barber–Scotia College – Adjunct Professor – Constitutional Law (1997)
- Cabarrus County Schools attorney (1979–97)
- Cabarrus County attorney (1985–2004, 2004–05)
- Water and Sewer Authority of Cabarrus County, Attorney (1992–present)
- 19-A Judicial District Bar Association
  - Secretary-Treasurer (1983–84 and 1987–97)
  - President (1985–86)
- Cabarrus County Bar Association: President (1986–87)
- N.C. Bar Association, Board of Governors (2006–2009)

=== Military service ===
Fletcher Hartsell served in the US Army Reserves as a First Lieutenant. He was an Honor Graduate Officer Basic Course, U. S. Army Infantry School, Fort Benning, Georgia, November 1972.

=== Religious leadership ===
Fletcher Hartsell has served throughout his life within the Southern Baptist Convention. He is currently a member of First Baptist Church in Kannapolis, NC where he serves as an usher and Sunday School Teacher.

- McGill Baptist Church (1955–91, 1992–2005)
  - Deaconate (Chairman 1979–80, 1987–88)
  - Sunday School Teacher
  - Church Training Director
  - Brotherhood Director
- West Cabarrus Church (1991–92)
  - "Tentmaker Family"
  - Sunday School Teacher
  - Honorary Life Member
- Cabarrus Baptist Association
  - Baptist Men's Director (1987–89)
  - Parliamentarian (1985–89)
  - New Church Starts Committee (1997–2001)
- Baptist State Convention of North Carolina
  - Regional Baptist Men's Director (1988–90)
  - Assistant Parliamentarian (1989)
- Christian Women's Job Corps of North Carolina
  - Founding Board of Directors (1999–2001)
- Baptist Retirement Homes of North Carolina, Inc.
  - Trustee (1998-2002)
- Southern Baptist Convention
  - Overseas Missions Volunteer
    - Guatemala (1985, 1986 and 2013)
    - Bermuda (1987)
    - Honduras (2000)
- National Fellowship of Baptist Lawyers (Secretary, 1989)

== Civic activity ==
Fletcher Hartsell is actively involved in a variety of state and local associations including the following:

- Cabarrus Community Health Centers, Inc.: Incorporator and Founding Director (2003–12)
- Concord High School P.T.S.O.: Co-president (1995–96)
- Cabarrus Academy (now Cannon School)
  - Board of Trustees (1984–88)
  - Chair (1986–87)
- Concord Rotary Club (1982–present)
- North Carolina Economic Development Board: Member (2002–13)
- Public School Forum of North Carolina: Board of Directors (1997–2003)
- North Carolina Center for Public Policy Research: Board of Directors (1997–99)
- Gold History Corporation: Board of Directors (1995–2002)
- North Carolina Center for Voter Education: Board of Directors (2003–05)

Fletcher Hartsell serves on the board of directors of the conservative nonprofit Rightchange.com.

== Political career ==
Hartsell faced no primary challenger and went on to defeat Democrat Mike Helms in the general election.

In 2012, Hartsell ran unopposed.

=== 2007 Complaint ===
An ethics complaint was filed against Hartsell with the North Carolina Senate Ethics Committee alleging conflict-of-interest based on his past legal representation of a developer and the Water and Sewer Authority of Cabarrus County. The complaint was dismissed by the North Carolina State Ethics Committee due to lack of probable cause.

This complaint was filed after a small group of residents in the Western part of Cabarrus County failed to get the appropriate legislative support for their incorporation efforts.

In its February 2008 report dismissing the matter, the Ethics Commission found "serious problems" with the charges in the complaints and concluded after an investigation that included input from various parties that allegations in the complaint were "without any legitimate factual or legal basis and thus lack merit"

=== 2013 Campaign finance audit ===
In January 2013, The Charlotte Observer reported that Hartsell spent nearly $100,000 of his campaign's money in 2011 and 2012 paying off debts on at least 10 personal credit cards. In an interview with the newspaper, Hartsell could not promise that campaign contribution money did not cover some personal expenses, which would be prohibited under state law. In a subsequent interview with his local paper, Independent Tribune, Hartsell stated that he was working to rectify the reporting errors by hiring a professional treasurer. "I've come to the realization that I have tried to do too much by handling the accounting side of my campaign finance reporting", Hartsell said in the January 15, 2013, article.

== Conviction ==
In 2017, Hartsell pleaded guilty to three felony counts in Federal court. Hartsell misused more than $200,000 in campaign funds by spending campaign donations on dinners with his family, haircuts, shoe repairs, speeding tickets, and part of his driver's license renewal fee. Hartsell was sentenced to eight months in prison.

Hartsell was also convicted of State charges related to filing fraudulent campaign finance reports on three separate occasions. He was sentenced to serve 18 months of unsupervised probation.

== Personal life ==
He has been married to Tana Honeycutt Hartsell since 1972. They have 3 children and 7 grandchildren. His son, F. Lee Hartsell III practices medicine in the Duke University Healthcare System as a neurologist.

== Awards and honors ==
During his tenure in the North Carolina Senate, Fletcher Hartsell was recognized by the North Carolina Center for Public Policy Research Most Effective Republican Senator in 1999, 2003, 2005, 2007 & 2009. In addition to that, he has also received a number of other awards:

- Legislator of the Year, North Carolina Nurses Association, 1997
- Honorary Fire Chief, North Carolina Fire Chiefs Association, 1999
- Most Effective Republican Senator, 1997 session, The Insider, July, 1997
- Legislator of the Year, North Carolina Health Directors, 2004
- Legislator of the Year, N. C. Association of Community Health Centers, 2007

Fletcher Hartsell was awarded the Order of the Long Leaf Pine in 1992.

In 2004, Davidson College Alumni Association recognized Hartsell with its Distinguished Service Award. This award "recognizes living alumni who have provided leadership or attained recognition on a national or regional level within their profession or business."

North Carolina Senate
| Preceded by James Calvin Johnson, Jr. | Member of the North Carolina Senate from the 22nd district 1991–2003 | Succeeded by Harris Blake |
| Preceded by John Carrington | Member of the North Carolina Senate from the 36th district 2003–2017 | Succeeded by Paul Newton |
