= Mike Woodard (politician) =

American politician from North Carolina (born 1959)

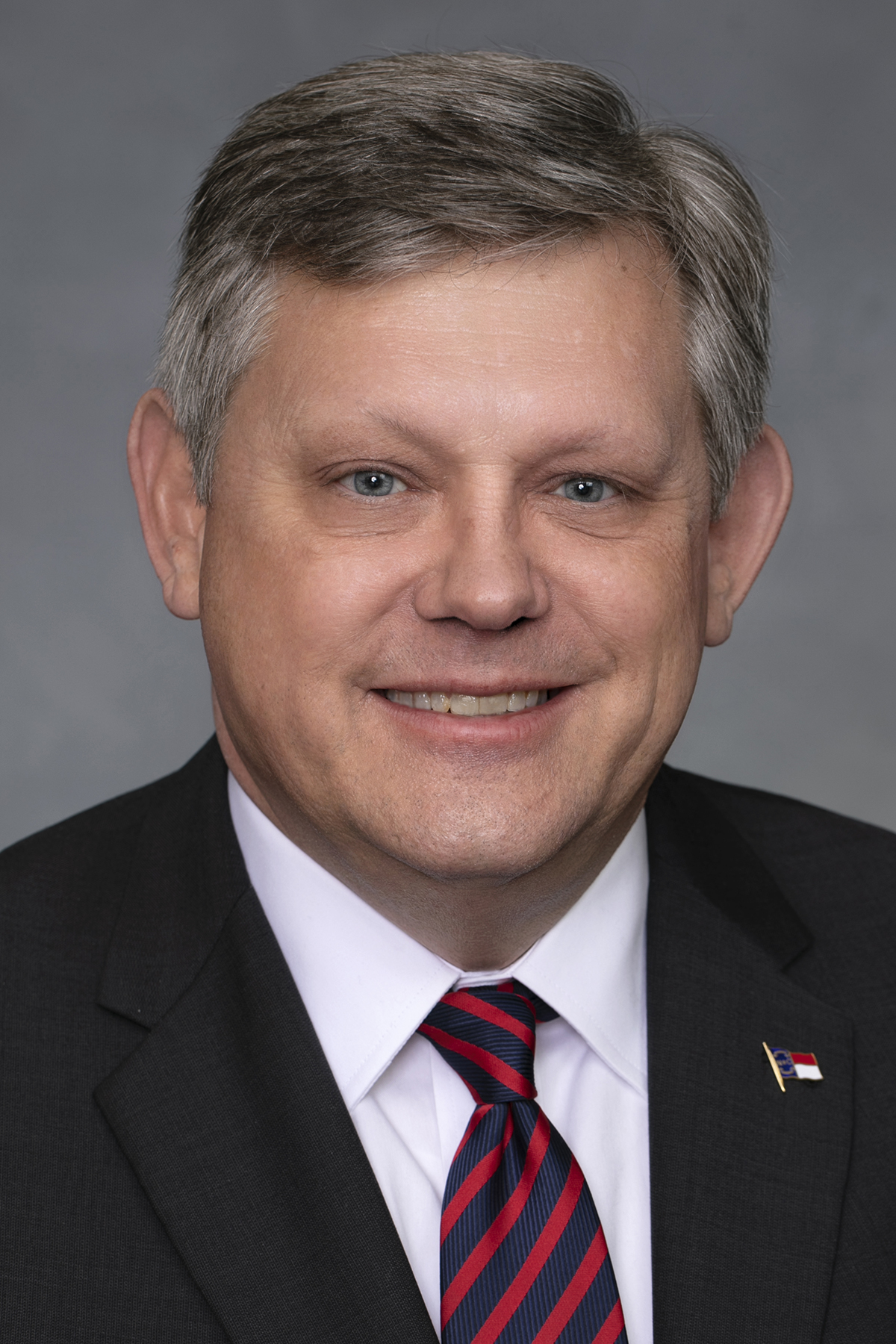
- Official portrait, 2023

Member of the North Carolina Senate from the 22nd district
- In office January 1, 2013 – January 1, 2025
- Preceded by: Constituency established
- Succeeded by: Sophia Chitlik

Personal details
- Born: James Michael Woodard; February 20, 1959 (age 67) Charleston, South Carolina, U.S.
- Party: Democratic
- Spouse: Sarah Woodard
- Education: Duke University (AB)
- Website: Senate website; Campaign website

James Michael Woodard (born February 20, 1959) is an American politician who served in the North Carolina Senate from the 22nd district from 2013 to 2025. A member of the Democratic Party, he represented most of Durham County.

Before being elected to the state Senate, Woodard served on the Durham City Council from 2005 to 2012. Since 1996, Woodard has been an administrator at Duke University and the Duke University Health System. He has served as a trustee of the Durham Arts Council as well as its president.

== Early life and education ==
James Michael Woodard was born on February 20, 1959, in Charleston, South Carolina. His father, a service member in the United States Air Force, was stationed in Charleston at the time, and during Woodard's childhood, his family also lived in Anchorage, Alaska, and Mountain Home, Idaho. When he was nine years old, he moved to Wilson, North Carolina, with his mother and brother after his father was deployed to Vietnam. Woodard attended Duke University and graduated with a Bachelor of Arts degree in 1981.

== Career ==
=== Duke University (1996–present) ===
Woodard has worked as an administrator at Duke University and the Duke University Health System since 1996. In a 2010 profile of Woodard, his job was described as an "analyst for Duke's Administrative Systems Management office".

=== Durham City Council (2005–2012) ===
Woodard was first elected to the Durham City Council in 2005, representing the city's third ward. He defeated incumbent city council member John Best Jr. He was reelected to the city council in 2009, defeating Allan Polak.

The News & Observer reported that during Woodard's time on the city council, he was "known for attending more Durham events than any other council member". He was considered a potential successor to Durham mayor Bill Bell, but he was elected to the North Carolina Senate before Bell's retirement in 2017.

=== North Carolina Senate (2013–2025) ===
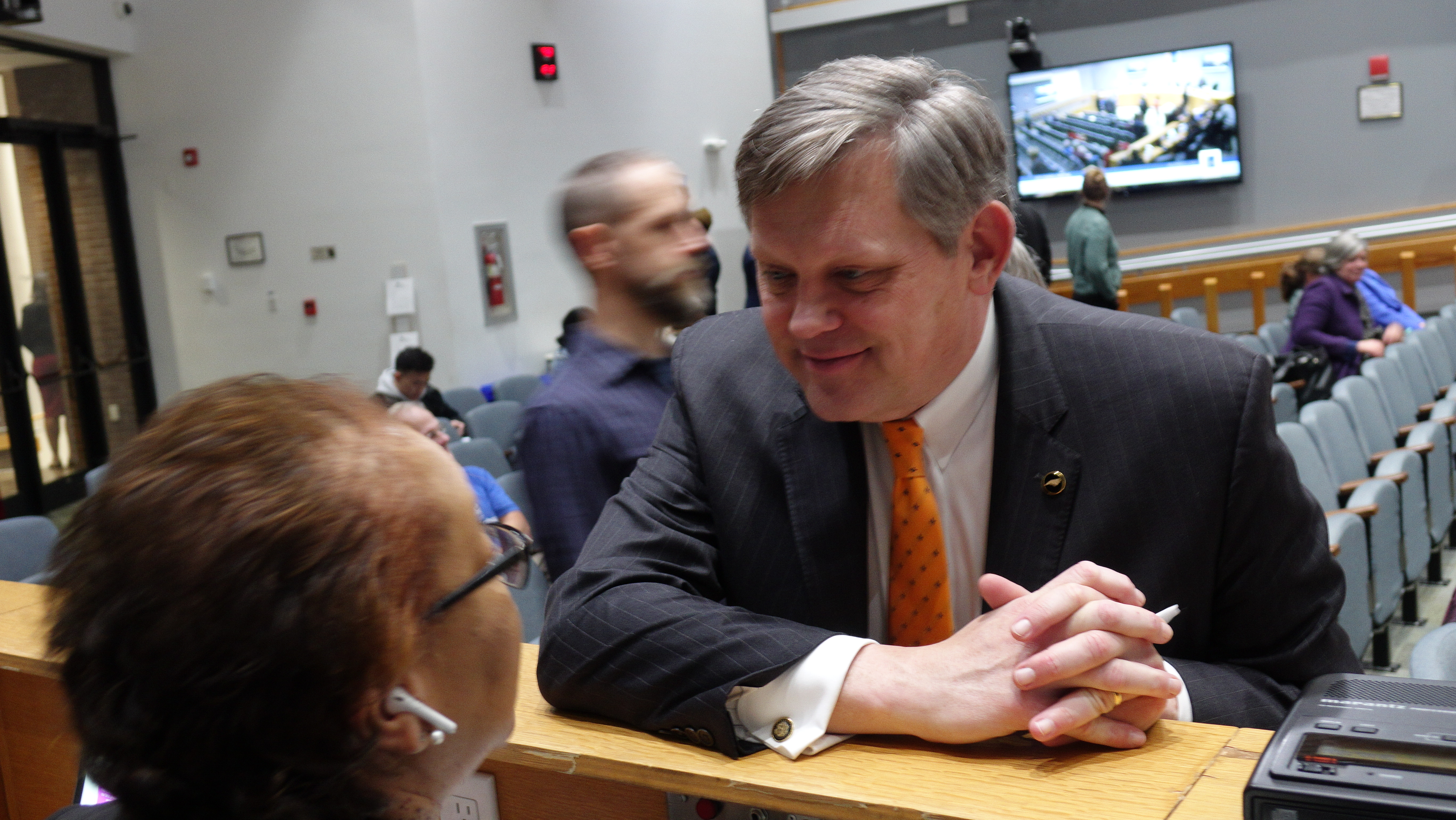
Woodard speaking with Durham deputy city manager Wanda Page in 2019

Woodard was first elected to represent the 22nd district in the North Carolina Senate in 2012, defeating Kerry Sutton in the Democratic primary and Milton Holmes in the general election. The 22nd district was an open seat after redistricting in North Carolina, and included parts of Durham, Person, and Caswell counties. Woodard was reelected to the state senate in 2014, 2016, 2018, 2020, and 2022. Following the 2020 North Carolina elections, the 22nd district was redrawn to comprise most of Durham County.

In March 2024, Woodard was defeated in the Democratic primary election by Sophia Chitlik. He had previously been criticized for voting with Republicans to override vetoes by governor Roy Cooper.

=== 2023 Durham mayoral campaign ===
Woodard announced his candidacy for mayor of Durham on July 11, 2023, after the incumbent mayor, Elaine O'Neal, decided not to seek reelection. Woodard, who has continued to serve in the North Carolina Senate during his mayoral campaign, had previously considered running for state treasurer. He said that one of his goals is to improve communication between the members of the Durham City Council. His platform includes increasing affordable housing in Durham and providing competitive wages for city employees. His campaign was endorsed by the North Carolina State AFL-CIO, the Friends of Durham PAC, and the Professional Firefighters of Durham union (which co-endorsed DeDreana Freeman).

Woodard advanced in the nonpartisan blanket primary on October 10, 2023, finishing second behind Durham City Council member Leonardo Williams. Williams was elected in the general election with 63 percent of the vote.

== Electoral history ==
North Carolina Senate 22nd district Democratic primary election, 2012
Party	Candidate	Votes	%
Democratic	Mike Woodard	22,356	67.8
Democratic	Kerry Sutton	10,621	32.2
Total votes		32,977	100.0

North Carolina Senate 22nd district general election, 2012
Party	Candidate	Votes	%
Democratic	Mike Woodard	67,484	65.4
Republican	Milton Holmes	35,730	34.6
Total votes		103,214	100.0

North Carolina Senate 22nd district general election, 2014
Party	Candidate	Votes	%
Democratic	Mike Woodard (incumbent)	47,978	67.1
Republican	Herman Joubert	23,491	32.9
Total votes		71,469	100.0

North Carolina Senate 22nd district general election, 2016
Party	Candidate	Votes	%
Democratic	Mike Woodard (incumbent)	74,693	65.6
Republican	T. Greg Doucette	39,198	34.4
Total votes		113,891	100.0

North Carolina Senate 22nd district general election, 2018
Party	Candidate	Votes	%
Democratic	Mike Woodard (incumbent)	46,153	61.8
Republican	Rick Padgett	26,989	36.1
Libertarian	Ray Ubinger	1,527	2.1
Total votes		74,669	100.0

North Carolina Senate 22nd district general election, 2020
Party	Candidate	Votes	%
Democratic	Mike Woodard (incumbent)	60,402	58.4
Republican	Rick Padgett	39,792	38.5
Libertarian	Ray Ubinger	3,175	3.1
Total votes		103,369	100.0

North Carolina Senate 22nd district general election, 2022
Party	Candidate	Votes	%
Democratic	Mike Woodard (incumbent)	60,402	78.4
Republican	Larry Coleman	15,070	19.6
Libertarian	Ray Ubinger	1,543	2.0
Total votes		77,015	100.0

== Personal life ==
He is married to Archdeacon Sarah Woodard, an Episcopal deacon and hospital chaplain.

North Carolina Senate
Preceded by Harris Blake	Member of the North Carolina Senate from the 22nd district 2013–2025	Succeeded by Sophia Chitlik
