= T. Greg Doucette =

American lawyer (born 1981)

- Born: Thomas Gregory Zawadzki; 1981 (age 44–45); Virginia Beach, Virginia, U.S.
- Education: North Carolina Central University (JD)
- Occupation: Lawyer
- Known for: Crowdsourced list of police brutality videos

Thomas Gregory ("T. Greg") Doucette (born 1981) is an American lawyer best known for indexing videos of police brutality. He originally compiled the videos in a Twitter thread and received thousands of submissions via direct messages. Mathematician Jason Miller began a public spreadsheet to track the content.

He ran as a Republican candidate in District 22 of the North Carolina Senate in 2016, but lost to the Democratic incumbent Mike Woodward.
