= Eddie Settle =

American politician

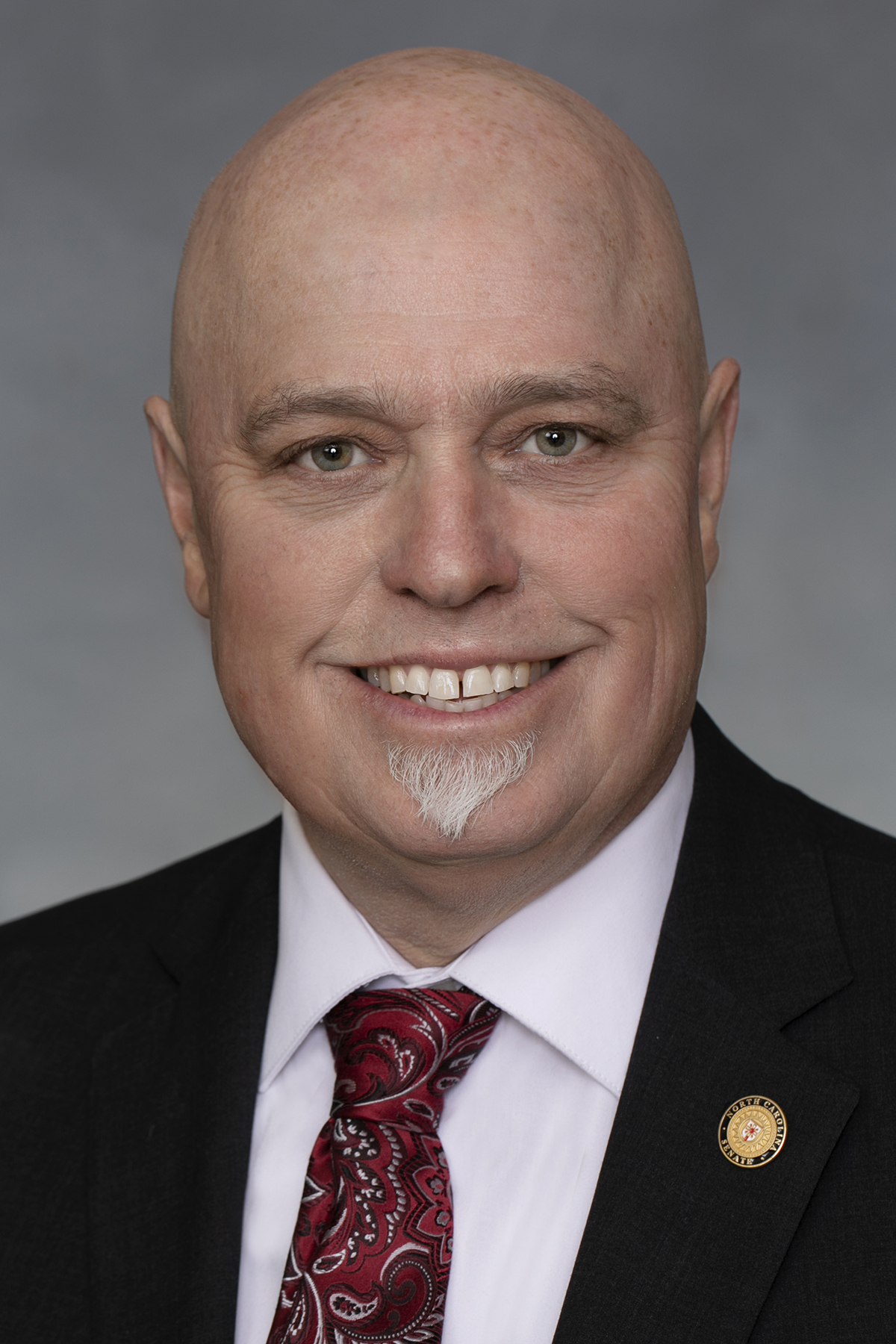

Member of the North Carolina Senate from the 36th district
- Incumbent
- Assumed office January 1, 2023
- Preceded by: Constituency established

Personal details
- Born: 1959 or 1960 (age 66–67)
- Party: Republican
- Spouse: Sheila
- Children: Melissa and Matt
- Education: East Wilkes High School, Wilkes Community College (AA)
- Profession: Business Owner
- Website: Official website

Eddie D. Settle (born 1959 or 1960) is an American politician who has served as a member of the North Carolina Senate since January 1, 2023. A Republican from Elkin, he represents the 36th district.

== Biography ==
Settle was born in 1959 or 1960. He is a Baptist. He graduated from East Wilkes High School in 1978, and earned an associate degree in business from Wilkes Community College in 1979.

== Committee assignments ==
=== 2023-2024 session ===
- Appropriations - Health and Human Services
- Agriculture, Energy, and Environment
- Pensions, Retirement, and Aging
- State and Local Government
- Transportation

== Electoral history ==
He was elected on November 8, 2022 in the 2022 North Carolina Senate election unopposed. He assumed office on January 1, 2023. He previously served 3 terms on the Wilkes County Commission.

North Carolina Senate 36th district Republican primary election, 2022
Party	Candidate	Votes	%
Republican	Eddie Settle	10,756	37.23%
Republican	Shirley Randleman	9,228	31.94%
Republican	Lee Zachary	5,053	17.49%
Republican	Vann Tate	3,852	13.33%
Total votes		28,889	100%

North Carolina Senate 36th district general election, 2022
Party	Candidate	Votes	%
Republican	Eddie Settle	65,973	100%
Total votes		65,973	100%
Republican win (new seat)			

North Carolina Senate
Preceded by Paul Newton	Member of the North Carolina Senate from the 36th district 2023–Present	Incumbent
