= Jessica Bichler =

American politician

Member-elect of the North Carolina Senate from the 7th district
- Assuming office January 1, 2027
- Succeeding: Michael Lee

Personal details
- Born: 1977 or 1978 (age 48–49)
- Party: Democratic
- Education: Ithaca College (BFA); University of South Carolina (MA)
- Occupation: Small business owner, yoga teacher

Jessica Bichler (born 1977 or 1978) is an American small business owner, yoga teacher, and politician who is a member-elect of the North Carolina Senate from the 7th district. A Democrat, she defeated Senate Majority Leader Michael Lee in the 2026 election.

== Career ==
Bichler earned a Bachelor of Fine Arts degree from Ithaca College and a master's degree in visual and cultural anthropology from the University of South Carolina. She began her career in the film industry and worked as a production coordinator. She has taught yoga for more than a decade and co-owns a yoga studio in Wilmington.

== Political career ==
Bichler entered the race for the 7th district in New Hanover County after her mother's death in 2025. Though she was not Democrats' first choice to challenge Lee, her fundraising and message discipline impressed party leaders. Her campaign called for fully funding Medicaid, preventing Duke Energy from charging ratepayers for planned projects, and protecting wetlands.

In her first run for office, she defeated Lee with 48,310 votes (52.64 percent) to 43,469 (47.36 percent). Lee had been seeking a sixth term and might have become the next leader of the Senate had he won.

== Electoral history ==
=== 2026 ===
North Carolina Senate 7th district general election, 2026
Party	Candidate	Votes	%
Democratic	Jessica Bichler	48,310	52.64%
Republican	Michael Lee (incumbent)	43,469	47.36%
Total votes		91,779	100%
Democratic gain from Republican			

North Carolina Senate
Preceded by Michael Lee	Member-elect of the North Carolina Senate from the 7th district Taking office January 1, 2027	Succeeded by TBD
