= Harris Blake =

American politician (1929–2014)

Member of the North Carolina Senate from the 22nd district
- In office January 1, 2003 – January 1, 2013
- Preceded by: Constituency established
- Succeeded by: Jerry Tillman (Redistricting)

Personal details
- Born: November 3, 1929 Jackson Springs, North Carolina, U.S.
- Died: June 9, 2014 (aged 84)
- Party: Republican
- Education: Elon University

Harris Durham Blake (November 3, 1929 – June 9, 2014) was a Republican member of the North Carolina General Assembly representing the state's twenty-second Senate district, which included constituents in Harnett, Lee and Moore counties. He was also the Republican nominee for North Carolina Secretary of State in 2000.

Born in Jackson Springs, North Carolina, Blake went to Elon University. He served on the Moore County, North Carolina School Board. Blake, a real estate agent from Pinehurst, North Carolina, served five terms in the North Carolina state Senate and chose to retire in 2012 and not seek a sixth term. He was deputy President pro tempore of the North Carolina Senate during his final two-year term. He died at his home in Moore County on June 9, 2014, at the age of 84.

Party political offices
Preceded by Richard Petty	Republican nominee for North Carolina Secretary of State; 2000	Succeeded by Jaye Rao
North Carolina Senate
Preceded by Fletcher Hartsell Jr.	Member of the North Carolina Senate from the 22nd district 2003–2013	Succeeded by Mike Woodard
