= Trudy Wade =

American politician

Member of the North Carolina Senate from the 27th district
- In office January 1, 2013 – January 1, 2019
- Preceded by: Don Vaughan
- Succeeded by: Michael Garrett

Personal details
- Born: July 18, 1951 (age 75) Greensboro, North Carolina, U.S.
- Party: Republican
- Education: Greensboro College (BS); Tuskegee Institute (DVM)

Trudy Wade (born July 18, 1951) is an American politician who served in the North Carolina Senate from the 27th district from 2013 to 2019. She represented the state's twenty-seventh Senate district, which consists of Guilford County, North Carolina

Senator Wade served as Chairman of the Senate's Select Committee on North Carolina River Water Quality, Chair of Senate's Environmental Review Commission, Co-Chairman of the following Committees: Senate's Appropriations on Natural and Economic Resources Committee, Senate's Commerce and Insurance. Additionally, the Senator served as a member on the following Committees: Agriculture/Environment/Natural Resources, Finance, Redistricting, Rules and Operations of the Senate, Select Committee on Elections, Select Committee on Nominations, Joint Legislative Oversight Committee on Agriculture and Natural and Economic Resources, Joint Legislative Economic Development and Global Engagement Oversight Committee, Joint Legislative Elections Oversight Committee, Joint Legislative Commission on Governmental Operations, Committee on Access to Healthcare in Rural North Carolina (LRC)(2017) and Advisory Member Revenue Laws Study Committee.

Senator Wade graduated from Greensboro College in 1975, earning a Bachelor of Science in Biology and graduated from Tuskegee Institute in 1980 earning a Doctor of Veterinary Medicine. After graduation, she opened a veterinary hospital in Jamestown, North Carolina.

North Carolina Senate
| Preceded by Don Vaughan | Member of the North Carolina Senate from the 27th district 2013–2019 | Succeeded by Michael Garrett |
