= Sophia Chitlik =

American politician

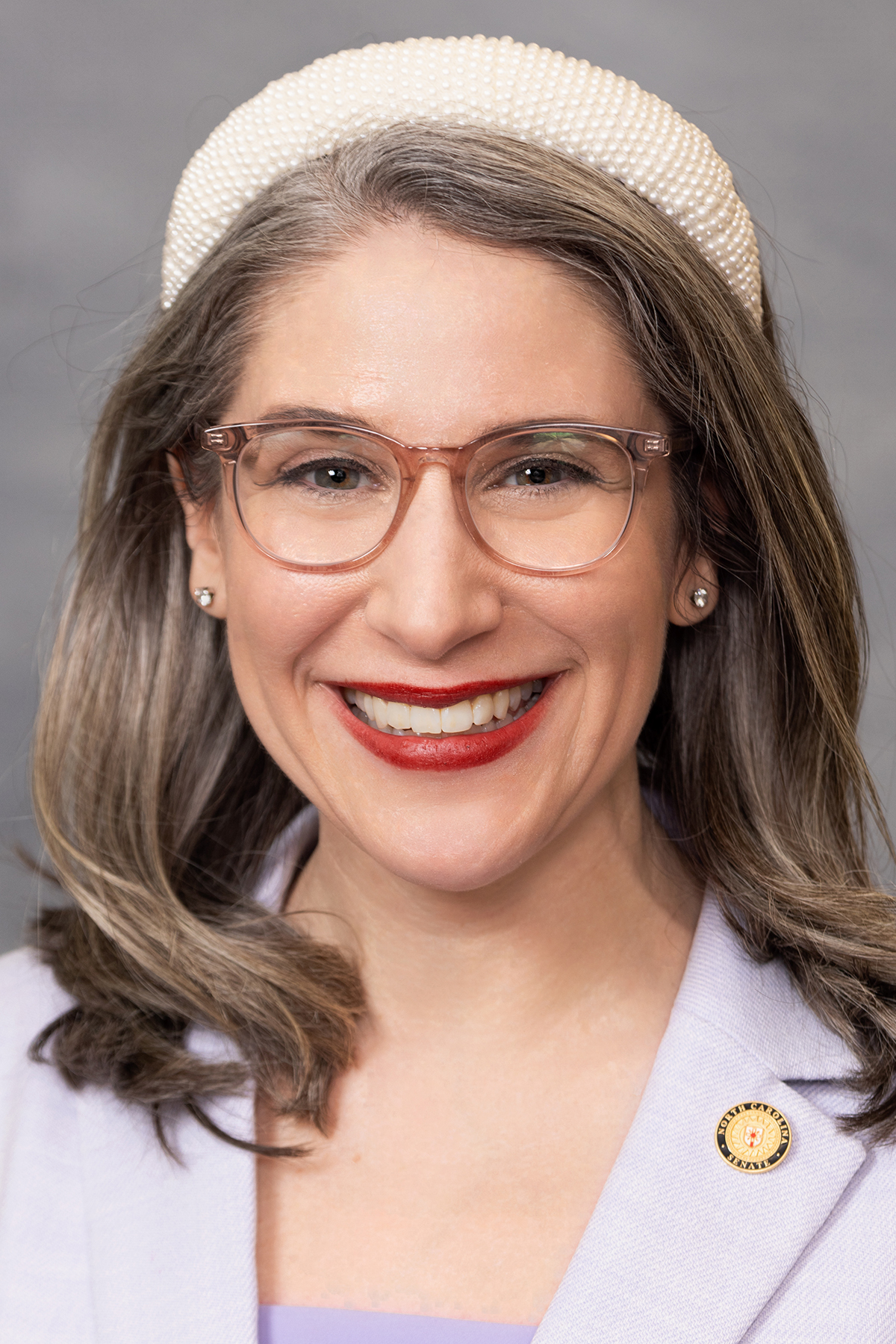

Member of the North Carolina Senate from the 22nd district
- Incumbent
- Assumed office January 1, 2025
- Preceded by: Mike Woodard

Personal details
- Born: 1989 or 1990 (age 36–37) Burbank, California, U.S.
- Party: Democratic
- Spouse: Ben Abram
- Education: New York University (BA)

Sophia Chitlik Abram (born 1989 or 1990) is an American politician serving as a member of the North Carolina Senate from the 22nd district since 2025. She was a field organizer for Barack Obama 2008 presidential campaign and later worked in the U.S. Department of Labor and the White House before transitioning to nonprofit leadership and impact investing.

== Early life and education ==
Chitlik was born in 1989 or 1990 and raised in Burbank, California. She graduated from Campbell Hall School in 2007 and then New York University.

== Career ==
Chitlik was a field organizer during the Barack Obama 2008 presidential campaign, where she led general election operations in Loudoun County, Virginia. She subsequently joined the Obama administration, working as a strategist in the U.S. Department of Labor and in priority placement at the White House.

She later served as chief operating officer of The Future Project, a nonprofit education startup company, overseeing an $11 million budget and leading growth initiatives. Chitlik has also engaged in philanthropy and impact investing, focusing on woman-owned businesses in the health and wellness sector and supporting initiatives aimed at increasing equity for underrepresented entrepreneurs.

In Durham, North Carolina, where she moved in 2017, Chitlik co-founded Tend, a company dedicated to supporting individuals through pregnancy and birth. She also collaborated on the development of Aya Birth & Community Wellness, which aims to become the first Black-owned birth center in North Carolina.

During the 2024 election, Chitlik ran for the 22nd district. She emphasized policies addressing education, healthcare equity, and support for working families. In the March 2024 Democratic primary, she defeated three-term incumbent Mike Woodard with 57.55% of the vote.

=== Electoral history ===
==== 2024 ====
North Carolina Senate 22nd district Democratic primary election, 2024
Party	Candidate	Votes	%
Democratic	Sophia Chitlik	17,270	57.59%
Democratic	Mike Woodard (incumbent)	12,719	42.41%
Total votes		29,989	100%

North Carolina Senate 22nd district general election, 2024
Party	Candidate	Votes	%
Democratic	Sophia Chitlik	83,844	85.98%
Libertarian	Ray Ubinger	13,674	14.02%
Total votes		97,518	100%
Democratic hold			

== Personal life ==
Chitlik has lived in Durham since 2017. She is a mother. Chitlik has lived in Los Angeles, Boulder, Budapest, Hungary, and Tel Aviv, Israel, and has done business in Israel. Chitlik attended New York University (NYU), majoring in Political Community Building. She is the winner of Jewish for Good's 2021 Young Leadership Award and is active in her synagogue, Beth El. She is married to Ben Abram, an energy company executive and the grandson of Morris B. Abram. In March 2025, the Federal Energy Regulatory Commission (FERC) alleged Abram's former company, American Efficient, had operated a fraudulent energy efficiency scheme and proposed fines of $722 million in civil penalties and $252 million in restitution against the company. In April 2026, FERC found that American Efficient "stole half a billion dollars from hard-working Americans" by collecting compensation through their "money-for-nothing scheme." FERC ordered American Efficient to disgorge approximately $410 million in unjust profits and imposed a civil penalty of $722 million.

North Carolina Senate
Preceded by Mike Woodard	Member of the North Carolina Senate from the 22nd district 2025–Present	Incumbent
