= Michael Garrett (politician) =

American politician (born 1980s)

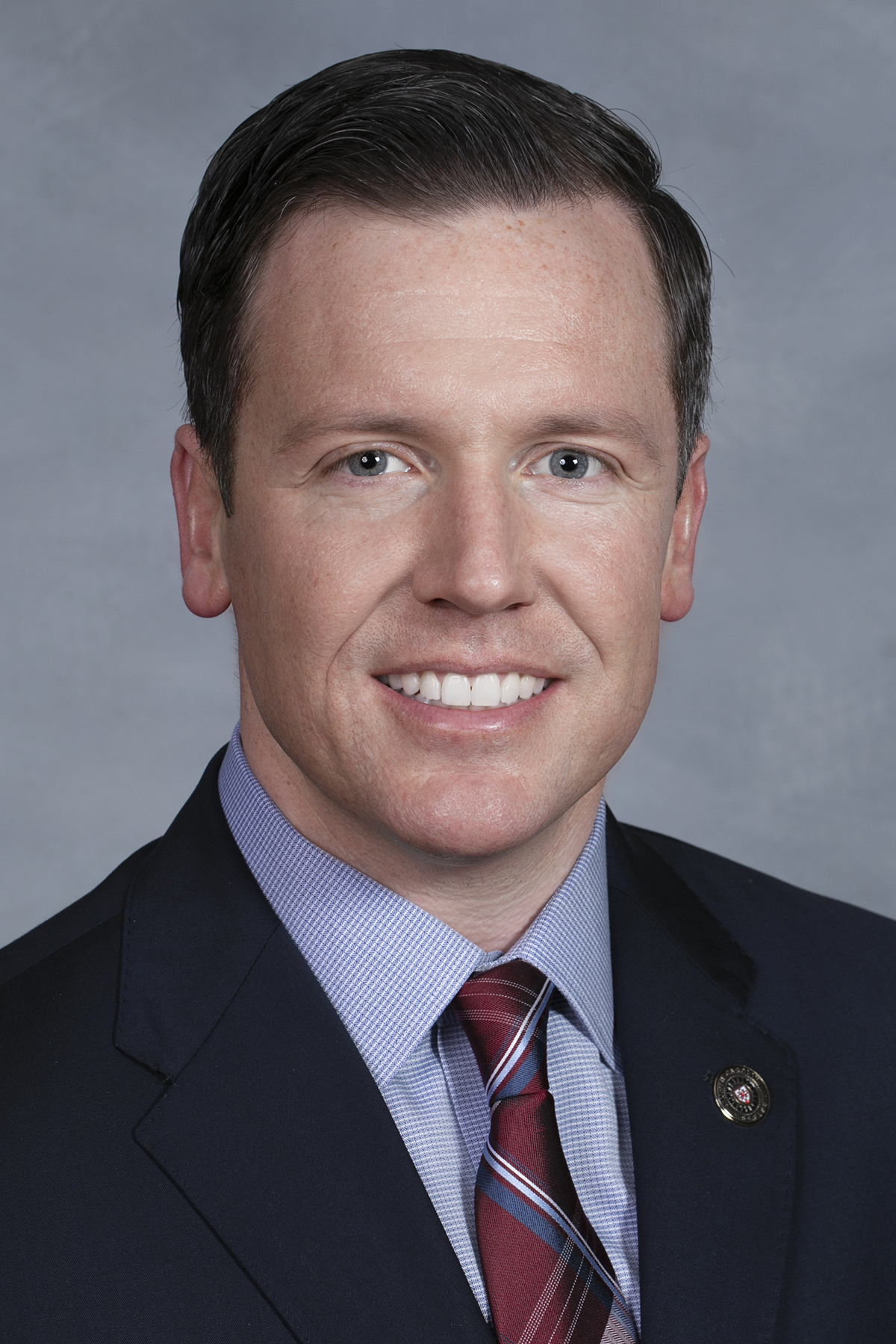
- Garrett in 2019

Member of the North Carolina Senate from the 27th district
- Incumbent
- Assumed office January 1, 2019
- Preceded by: Trudy Wade

Personal details
- Born: Michael Kennedy Garrett; 1984 or 1985 (age 41–42) Robeson County, North Carolina, US
- Party: Democratic
- Education: UNC-Greensboro

Michael Kennedy Garrett (born 1984 or 1985) is an American politician. A Democrat, he is a member of the North Carolina Senate, representing the 27th district. He was elected in 2018, defeating Republican incumbent Trudy Wade.

North Carolina Senate
Preceded by Trudy Wade	Member of the North Carolina Senate from the 27th district 2019-Present	Incumbent
