= Kenneth R. Harris =

American politician (1935–2009)

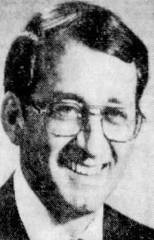

48th Mayor of Charlotte
- In office 1977–1979
- Preceded by: John M. Belk
- Succeeded by: Eddie Knox

Personal details
- Born: Kenneth Rhyne Harris; May 16, 1935 Harmony, North Carolina, U.S.
- Died: January 17, 2009 (aged 73)
- Party: Republican
- Children: 1
- Parent(s): Roy Lee Harris; Beulah Barker Harris
- Education: University of North Carolina at Chapel Hill
- Profession: Politician

Kenneth Rhyne Harris Sr. (May 16, 1935 – January 17, 2009) was the 48th Mayor of Charlotte, North Carolina serving from 1977 to 1979.

Harris was born in Harmony, North Carolina on May 16, 1935 to Roy Lee and Beulah Barker Harris. He attended Iredell County Schools and received his degree from the University of North Carolina at Chapel Hill.

Harris was the first Republican Mayor of Charlotte in the twentieth century having been elected in 1977 in what was then considered a major upset. During his term he championed the development of the Charlotte Douglas International Airport including passing a bond issue which resulted in the construction of a new terminal which was instrumental in the growth of the city in the following decades.

After leaving the office of mayor, Harris was elected to the North Carolina State Senate for two terms. He was appointed in 1988 to the North Carolina State Board of Education by Governor Jim Martin and later served as the chairman of that board under Governor Jim Hunt.

Harris worked professionally in the insurance industry and was a member of the North Carolina Air National Guard for twenty years rising to the rank of major.

Harris's son, Ken Harris Jr. ran unsuccessfully for the Charlotte City Council in 2013.
