= North Carolina's 36th Senate district =

American legislative district

North Carolina's 36th State Senate district
Senator
Eddie Settle; R–Elkin
- Demographics: 84% White; 4% Black; 9% Hispanic; 1% Asian; 1% Other; 2% Multiracial
- Population (2023): 211,249

North Carolina's 36th Senate district is one of 50 districts in the North Carolina Senate. It has been represented by Republican Eddie Settle since 2023.

== Geography ==
Since 2023, the district has included all of Alexander, Wilkes, Surry, and Yadkin counties. The district overlaps with the 77th, 90th, and 94th state house districts.

== District officeholders since 1993 ==
Senator	Party	Dates	Notes	Counties
District created January 1, 1993.				1993–2003; Parts of Wake County.
Linda Hinkleman Gunter (Cary)	Democratic	January 1, 1993 – January 1, 1995	Lost re-election.	1993–2003; Parts of Wake County.
John Carrington (Raleigh)	Republican	January 1, 1995 – January 1, 2003	Redistricted to the 15th district.	1993–2003; Parts of Wake County.
Fletcher Hartsell Jr. (Concord)	Republican	January 1, 2003 – January 1, 2017	Redistricted from the 22nd district. Retired.	2003–2005; All of Cabarrus County. Part of Rowan County.
Fletcher Hartsell Jr. (Concord)	Republican	January 1, 2003 – January 1, 2017	Redistricted from the 22nd district. Retired.	2005–2013; All of Cabarrus County. Part of Iredell County.
Fletcher Hartsell Jr. (Concord)	Republican	January 1, 2003 – January 1, 2017	Redistricted from the 22nd district. Retired.	2013–2023; All of Cabarrus County. Part of Union County.
Paul Newton (Mount Pleasant)	Republican	January 1, 2017 – January 1, 2023	Redistricted to the 34th district.	2013–2023; All of Cabarrus County. Part of Union County.
Eddie Settle (Elkin)	Republican	January 1, 2023 – Present		2023–Present; All of Alexander, Wilkes, Surry, and Yadkin counties.

== Election results ==
=== 2024 ===
North Carolina Senate 36th district general election, 2024
Party	Candidate	Votes	%
Republican	Eddie Settle (incumbent)	88,102	78.98%
Democratic	Darren Staley	23,444	21.02%
Total votes		111,546	100%
Republican hold			

=== 2022 ===
North Carolina Senate 36th district Republican primary election, 2022
Party	Candidate	Votes	%
Republican	Eddie Settle	10,756	37.23%
Republican	Shirley Randleman	9,228	31.94%
Republican	Lee Zachary	5,053	17.49%
Republican	Vann Tate	3,852	13.33%
Total votes		28,889	100%

North Carolina Senate 36th district general election, 2022
Party	Candidate	Votes	%
Republican	Eddie Settle	65,973	100%
Total votes		65,973	100%
Republican win (new seat)			

=== 2020 ===
North Carolina Senate 36th district general election, 2020
Party	Candidate	Votes	%
Republican	Paul Newton (incumbent)	69,932	57.71%
Democratic	Marcus J. Singleton	51,249	42.29%
Total votes		121,181	100%
Republican hold			

=== 2018 ===
North Carolina Senate 36th district general election, 2018
Party	Candidate	Votes	%
Republican	Paul Newton (incumbent)	44,938	56.63%
Democratic	Mark E. Shelley	34,416	43.37%
Total votes		79,354	100%
Republican hold			

=== 2016 ===
North Carolina Senate 36th district Democratic primary election, 2016
Party	Candidate	Votes	%
Democratic	Robert Brown	8,629	65.04%
Democratic	Andrew W. Platek	4,638	34.96%
Total votes		13,267	100%

North Carolina Senate 36th district Republican primary election, 2016
Party	Candidate	Votes	%
Republican	Paul Newton	9,562	37.04%
Republican	Scott C. Aumuller	7,749	30.02%
Republican	Amy Blake	5,509	21.34%
Republican	Parish Moffitt	2,994	11.60%
Total votes		25,814	100%

North Carolina Senate 36th district general election, 2016
Party	Candidate	Votes	%
Republican	Paul Newton	59,584	62.56%
Democratic	Robert Brown	35,664	37.44%
Total votes		95,248	100%
Republican hold			

=== 2014 ===
North Carolina Senate 36th district Republican primary election, 2014
Party	Candidate	Votes	%
Republican	Fletcher Hartsell Jr. (incumbent)	7,496	60.68%
Republican	Fred Biggers	4,858	39.32%
Total votes		12,354	100%

North Carolina Senate 36th district general election, 2014
Party	Candidate	Votes	%
Republican	Fletcher Hartsell Jr. (incumbent)	39,774	100%
Total votes		39,774	100%
Republican hold			

=== 2012 ===
North Carolina Senate 36th district general election, 2012
Party	Candidate	Votes	%
Republican	Fletcher Hartsell Jr. (incumbent)	60,957	100%
Total votes		60,957	100%
Republican hold			

=== 2010 ===
North Carolina Senate 36th district general election, 2010
Party	Candidate	Votes	%
Republican	Fletcher Hartsell Jr. (incumbent)	37,403	69.02%
Democratic	Mike Helms	16,790	30.98%
Total votes		54,193	100%
Republican hold			

=== 2008 ===
North Carolina Senate 36th district Democratic primary election, 2008
Party	Candidate	Votes	%
Democratic	Jim Johnson	10,210	50.93%
Democratic	Mike Helms	9,838	49.07%
Total votes		20,048	100%

North Carolina Senate 36th district Republican primary election, 2008
Party	Candidate	Votes	%
Republican	Fletcher Hartsell Jr. (incumbent)	7,164	68.29%
Republican	Thomas B. Hill	3,327	31.71%
Total votes		10,491	100%

North Carolina Senate 36th district general election, 2008
Party	Candidate	Votes	%
Republican	Fletcher Hartsell Jr. (incumbent)	50,052	56.81%
Democratic	Charles Paxton	38,047	43.19%
Total votes		88,099	100%
Republican hold			

=== 2006 ===
North Carolina Senate 36th district general election, 2006
Party	Candidate	Votes	%
Republican	Fletcher Hartsell Jr. (incumbent)	22,269	63.18%
Democratic	Mike Helms	12,978	36.82%
Total votes		35,247	100%
Republican hold			

=== 2004 ===
North Carolina Senate 36th district general election, 2004
Party	Candidate	Votes	%
Republican	Fletcher Hartsell Jr. (incumbent)	46,848	81.42%
Libertarian	Mike Helms	10,692	18.58%
Total votes		57,540	100%
Republican hold			

=== 2002 ===
North Carolina Senate 36th district general election, 2002
Party	Candidate	Votes	%
Republican	Fletcher Hartsell Jr. (incumbent)	31,428	66.23%
Democratic	Larry Harris	13,363	28.16%
Libertarian	Mike Helms	2,664	5.61%
Total votes		47,455	100%
Republican hold			

=== 2000 ===
North Carolina Senate 36th district Democratic primary election, 2000
Party	Candidate	Votes	%
Democratic	James C. Crew	5,857	55.69%
Democratic	Carlton W. Mosley	4,660	44.31%
Total votes		10,517	100%

North Carolina Senate 36th district general election, 2000
Party	Candidate	Votes	%
Republican	John Carrington (incumbent)	56,010	55.90%
Democratic	James C. Crew	44,181	44.10%
Total votes		100,191	100%
Republican hold			
