= Paul Newton (politician) =

American politician

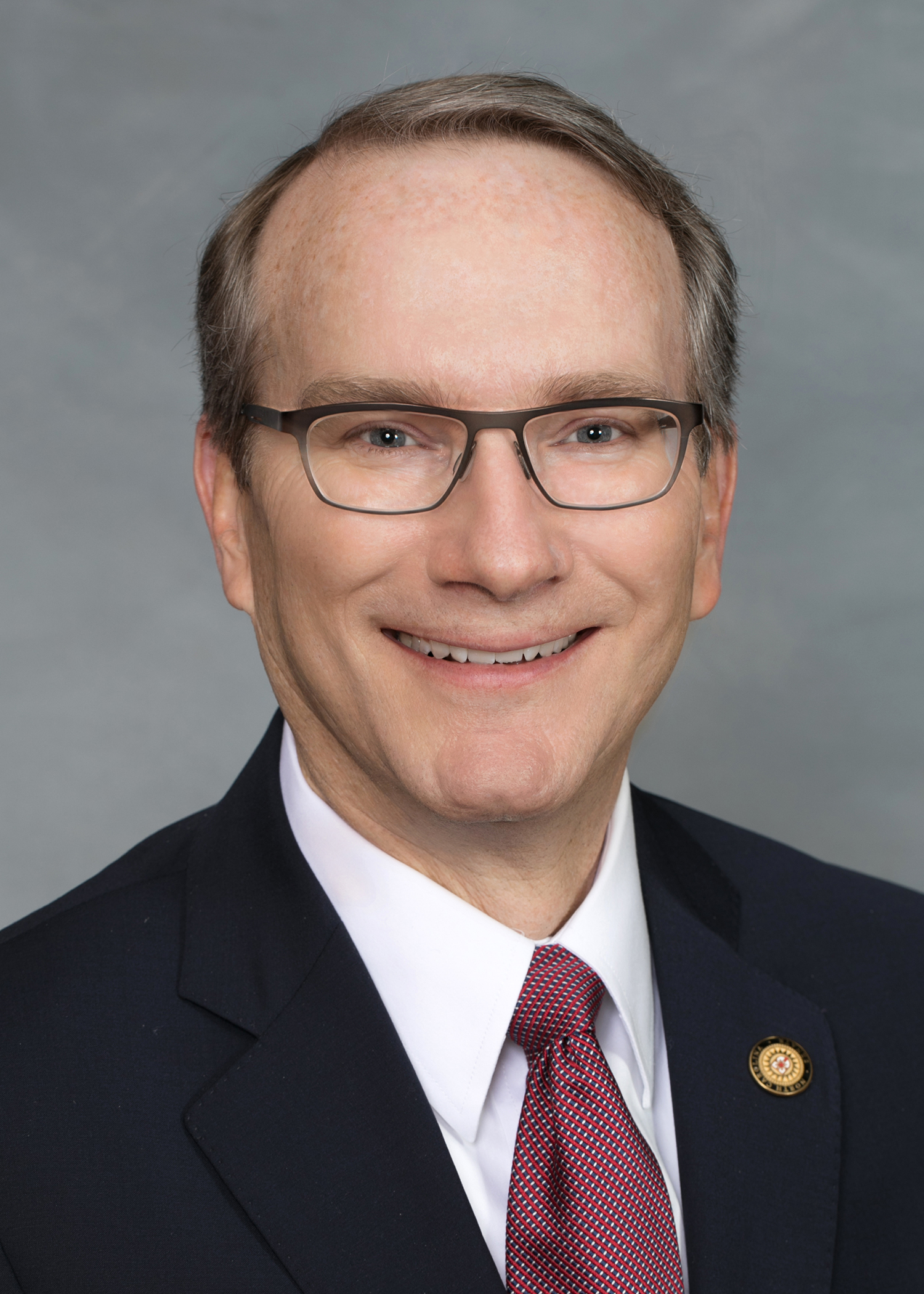

Majority Leader of the North Carolina Senate
- In office January 1, 2023 – March 26, 2025
- Preceded by: Kathy Harrington
- Succeeded by: Michael V. Lee

Member of the North Carolina Senate
- In office January 1, 2017 – March 26, 2025
- Preceded by: Fletcher L. Hartsell Jr.
- Succeeded by: Chris Measmer
- Constituency: 36th district (2017–2023); 34th district (2023–2025)

Personal details
- Born: Paul Robert Newton; June 2, 1960 (age 66) Eden, North Carolina, U.S.
- Party: Republican
- Spouse: Melanie
- Children: 4
- Education: University of North Carolina, Chapel Hill (BS, JD)

Paul Robert Newton (born June 2, 1960) is an American business executive, politician and Republican who was a member of the North Carolina State Senate from 2017 until 2025, formerly representing the 36th and 34th districts. He resigned from the Senate in March 2025 to serve as Vice Chancellor and general counsel for the University of North Carolina at Chapel Hill.

== Political career ==
In April 2020, during the COVID-19 pandemic in North Carolina, Newton was one of five Republican state senators asked Governor Roy Cooper to allow the Coca-Cola 600, a NASCAR race, to be run at Charlotte Motor Speedway, although without a crowd of fans. The following year, Newton sponsored a "liability shield" bill to provide a limited form of immunity to businesses, government agency or nonprofit against lawsuits arising from COVID-19 transmission on their premises.

In 2021, amid nationwide Republican efforts to Republican efforts to restrict voting following the 2020 presidential election, Newton proposed legislation that would prevent counties from counting valid mail-in absentee ballots postmarked before or on election day unless they were received by the polling places by 5 p.m. on election day. Newton argued that it was "suspicious" for valid absentee ballots to be counted after election day. In the 2020 elections, 11,000 ballots arrived in the three-day grace period after election day and were counted; under Newton's proposal, they would have been thrown out.

Newton, a retired Duke Energy executive and member of the state Senate's energy committee, opposed natural gas production limitations in North Carolina.

In 2021, as co-chairman of the Senate Finance Committee, Newton sponsored a proposal to reduce the state income tax rate from 5.25% to 4.99%.

In November 2022, Newton was elected by his colleagues to become Senate Majority Leader for the 2023–2024 session. He served in that role until his resignation in 2025, after which he joined the administration at University of North Carolina at Chapel Hill.

== Electoral history ==
=== 2022 ===
2022 North Carolina Senate 34th district general election
| Party | Candidate | Votes | % |
|---|---|---|---|
| Republican | Paul Newton (incumbent) | 40,991 | 56.90% |
| Democratic | Keshia Sandidge | 31,044 | 43.10% |
| Total votes | | 72,035 | 100% |
| Republican hold | | | |

=== 2020 ===
2020 North Carolina Senate 36th district general election
| Party | Candidate | Votes | % |
|---|---|---|---|
| Republican | Paul Newton (incumbent) | 69,932 | 57.71% |
| Democratic | Marcus J. Singleton | 51,249 | 42.29% |
| Total votes | | 121,181 | 100% |
| Republican hold | | | |

=== 2018 ===
2018 North Carolina Senate 36th district general election
| Party | Candidate | Votes | % |
|---|---|---|---|
| Republican | Paul Newton (incumbent) | 44,938 | 56.63% |
| Democratic | Mark E. Shelley | 34,416 | 43.37% |
| Total votes | | 79,354 | 100% |
| Republican hold | | | |

=== 2016 ===
Republican primary for the 2016 North Carolina Senate 36th district election
| Party | Candidate | Votes | % |
|---|---|---|---|
| Republican | Paul Newton | 9,562 | 37.04% |
| Republican | Scott C. Aumuller | 7,749 | 30.02% |
| Republican | Amy Blake | 5,509 | 21.34% |
| Republican | Parish Moffitt | 2,994 | 11.60% |
| Total votes | | 25,814 | 100% |

2016 North Carolina Senate 36th district general election
| Party | Candidate | Votes | % |
|---|---|---|---|
| Republican | Paul Newton | 59,584 | 62.56% |
| Democratic | Robert Brown | 35,664 | 37.44% |
| Total votes | | 95,248 | 100% |
| Republican hold | | | |

North Carolina Senate
| Preceded by Kathy Harrington | Majority Leader of the North Carolina Senate; 2023–2025 | Succeeded by Michael V. Lee |
