= North Carolina's 34th Senate district =

American legislative district

North Carolina's 34th State Senate district
Senator
| Chris Measmer; R–Concord |
- Demographics: 58% White; 19% Black; 12% Hispanic; 6% Asian; 1% Other; 4% Multiracial
- Population (2023): 222,473

North Carolina's 34th Senate district is one of 50 districts in the North Carolina Senate. It has been represented by Republican Chris Measmer since his appointment in 2025.

== Geography ==
Since 2023, the district has included part of Cabarrus County. The district overlaps with the 73rd, 82nd, and 83rd state house districts.

== District officeholders ==
| Senator | Party | Dates | Notes | Counties |
|---|---|---|---|---|
| T. L. "Fountain" Odom (Charlotte) | Democratic | January 1, 1989 – January 1, 2003 | Redistricted to the 40th district and lost re-election. | 1989–2003; Parts of Mecklenburg and Lincoln counties. |
| Andrew Brock (Mocksville) | Republican | January 1, 2003 – June 30, 2017 | Resigned. | 2003–2005; All of Yadkin and Davie counties. Part of Rowan County. |
| Andrew Brock (Mocksville) | Republican | January 1, 2003 – June 30, 2017 | Resigned. | 2005–2013; All of Davie and Rowan counties. |
| Andrew Brock (Mocksville) | Republican | January 1, 2003 – June 30, 2017 | Resigned. | 2013–2019; All of Davie County. Parts of Iredell and Rowan counties. |
| Vacant | | June 30, 2017 – August 23, 2017 | | 2013–2019; All of Davie County. Parts of Iredell and Rowan counties. |
| Dan Barrett (Advance) | Republican | August 23, 2017 – January 1, 2019 | Appointed to finish Brock's term. Redistricted to the 31st district and lost re-nomination. | 2013–2019; All of Davie County. Parts of Iredell and Rowan counties. |
| Vickie Sawyer (Mooresville) | Republican | January 1, 2019 – January 1, 2023 | Redistricted to the 37th district. | 2019–2023; All of Iredell and Yadkin counties. |
| Paul Newton (Mount Pleasant) | Republican | January 1, 2023 – March 26, 2025 | Redistricted from the 36th district. Resigned. | 2023–Present; Most of Cabarrus County. |
| Vacant | | March 26, 2025 – April 10, 2025 | | 2023–Present; Most of Cabarrus County. |
| Chris Measmer (Concord) | Republican | April 10, 2025 – Present | Appointed to finish Newton's term. | 2023–Present; Most of Cabarrus County. |

== Election results ==
=== 2024 ===
North Carolina Senate 34th district general election, 2024
| Party | Candidate | Votes | % |
|---|---|---|---|
| Republican | Paul Newton (incumbent) | 58,166 | 52.93% |
| Democratic | Kim Sexton-Lewter | 48,558 | 44.19% |
| Libertarian | Thomas Hill | 3,171 | 2.89% |
| Total votes | | 109,895 | 100% |
| Republican hold | | | |

=== 2022 ===
North Carolina Senate 34th district general election, 2022
| Party | Candidate | Votes | % |
|---|---|---|---|
| Republican | Paul Newton (incumbent) | 40,991 | 56.90% |
| Democratic | Keshia Sandidge | 31,044 | 43.10% |
| Total votes | | 72,035 | 100% |
| Republican hold | | | |

=== 2020 ===
North Carolina Senate 34th district general election, 2020
| Party | Candidate | Votes | % |
|---|---|---|---|
| Republican | Vickie Sawyer (incumbent) | 83,707 | 71.01% |
| Democratic | Barry Templeton | 34,172 | 28.99% |
| Total votes | | 117,879 | 100% |
| Republican hold | | | |

=== 2018 ===
North Carolina Senate 34th district Democratic primary election, 2018
| Party | Candidate | Votes | % |
|---|---|---|---|
| Democratic | Beniah McMiller | 1,483 | 43.46% |
| Democratic | William Stinson | 1,271 | 37.25% |
| Democratic | Lisaney Kong | 658 | 19.28% |
| Total votes | | 3,412 | 100% |

North Carolina Senate 34th district Republican primary election, 2018
| Party | Candidate | Votes | % |
|---|---|---|---|
| Republican | Vickie Sawyer | 4,800 | 43.83% |
| Republican | Bob Rucho | 3,636 | 33.20% |
| Republican | A. J. Daoud | 1,519 | 13.87% |
| Republican | William "Bill" Howell | 996 | 9.10% |
| Total votes | | 10,951 | 100% |

North Carolina Senate 34th district general election, 2018
| Party | Candidate | Votes | % |
|---|---|---|---|
| Republican | Vickie Sawyer | 54,635 | 69.73% |
| Democratic | Beniah McMiller | 23,716 | 30.27% |
| Total votes | | 78,351 | 100% |
| Republican win (new seat) | | | |

=== 2016 ===
North Carolina Senate 34th district general election, 2016
| Party | Candidate | Votes | % |
|---|---|---|---|
| Republican | Andrew Brock (incumbent) | 69,470 | 100% |
| Total votes | | 69,470 | 100% |
| Republican hold | | | |

=== 2014 ===
North Carolina Senate 34th district general election, 2014
| Party | Candidate | Votes | % |
|---|---|---|---|
| Republican | Andrew Brock (incumbent) | 38,010 | 66.05% |
| Democratic | Constance L. "Connie" Johnson | 19,533 | 33.95% |
| Total votes | | 57,543 | 100% |
| Republican hold | | | |

=== 2012 ===
North Carolina Senate 34th district general election, 2012
| Party | Candidate | Votes | % |
|---|---|---|---|
| Republican | Andrew Brock (incumbent) | 62,728 | 100% |
| Total votes | | 62,728 | 100% |
| Republican hold | | | |

=== 2010 ===
North Carolina Senate 34th district Republican primary election, 2010
| Party | Candidate | Votes | % |
|---|---|---|---|
| Republican | Andrew Brock (incumbent) | 9,752 | 67.31% |
| Republican | John H. Ferguson | 2,642 | 18.24% |
| Republican | Robert Dale Stirewalt | 2,094 | 14.45% |
| Total votes | | 14,488 | 100% |

North Carolina Senate 34th district general election, 2010
| Party | Candidate | Votes | % |
|---|---|---|---|
| Republican | Andrew Brock (incumbent) | 36,969 | 100% |
| Total votes | | 36,969 | 100% |
| Republican hold | | | |

=== 2008 ===
North Carolina Senate 34th district general election, 2008
| Party | Candidate | Votes | % |
|---|---|---|---|
| Republican | Andrew Brock (incumbent) | 47,960 | 61.17% |
| Democratic | John Carlyle Sherrill III | 30,443 | 38.83% |
| Total votes | | 78,403 | 100% |
| Republican hold | | | |

=== 2006 ===
North Carolina Senate 34th district general election, 2006
| Party | Candidate | Votes | % |
|---|---|---|---|
| Republican | Andrew Brock (incumbent) | 21,608 | 60.60% |
| Democratic | Larry Brown | 14,048 | 39.40% |
| Total votes | | 35,656 | 100% |
| Republican hold | | | |

=== 2004 ===
North Carolina Senate 34th district Republican primary election, 2004
| Party | Candidate | Votes | % |
|---|---|---|---|
| Republican | Andrew Brock (incumbent) | 7,726 | 66.76% |
| Republican | Gus Andrews | 3,846 | 33.24% |
| Total votes | | 11,572 | 100% |

North Carolina Senate 34th district general election, 2004
| Party | Candidate | Votes | % |
|---|---|---|---|
| Republican | Andrew Brock (incumbent) | 41,800 | 63.31% |
| Democratic | Larry C. Brown | 24,223 | 36.69% |
| Total votes | | 66,023 | 100% |
| Republican hold | | | |

=== 2002 ===
North Carolina Senate 34th district Democratic primary election, 2002
| Party | Candidate | Votes | % |
|---|---|---|---|
| Democratic | John Carlyle Sherrill III | 4,720 | 58.82% |
| Democratic | Debra Brown Groce | 3,305 | 41.18% |
| Total votes | | 8,025 | 100% |

North Carolina Senate 34th district Republican primary election, 2002
| Party | Candidate | Votes | % |
|---|---|---|---|
| Republican | Andrew Brock | 6,816 | 36.69% |
| Republican | Gus Andrews | 5,972 | 32.15% |
| Republican | Mac Butner | 4,830 | 26.00% |
| Republican | Baxter (Bo) Turner | 957 | 5.15% |
| Total votes | | 18,575 | 100% |

North Carolina Senate 34th district general election, 2002
| Party | Candidate | Votes | % |
|---|---|---|---|
| Republican | Andrew Brock | 28,593 | 60.19% |
| Democratic | John Carlyle Sherrill III | 17,625 | 37.10% |
| Libertarian | J. Conrad Jones | 1,290 | 2.72% |
| Total votes | | 47,508 | 100% |
| Republican win (new seat) | | | |

=== 2000 ===
North Carolina Senate 34th district general election, 2000
| Party | Candidate | Votes | % |
|---|---|---|---|
| Democratic | T. L. "Fountain" Odom (incumbent) | 46,682 | 56.17% |
| Republican | Jeffrey Ober | 36,430 | 43.83% |
| Total votes | | 83,112 | 100% |
| Democratic hold | | | |
