= Chris Measmer =

American politician

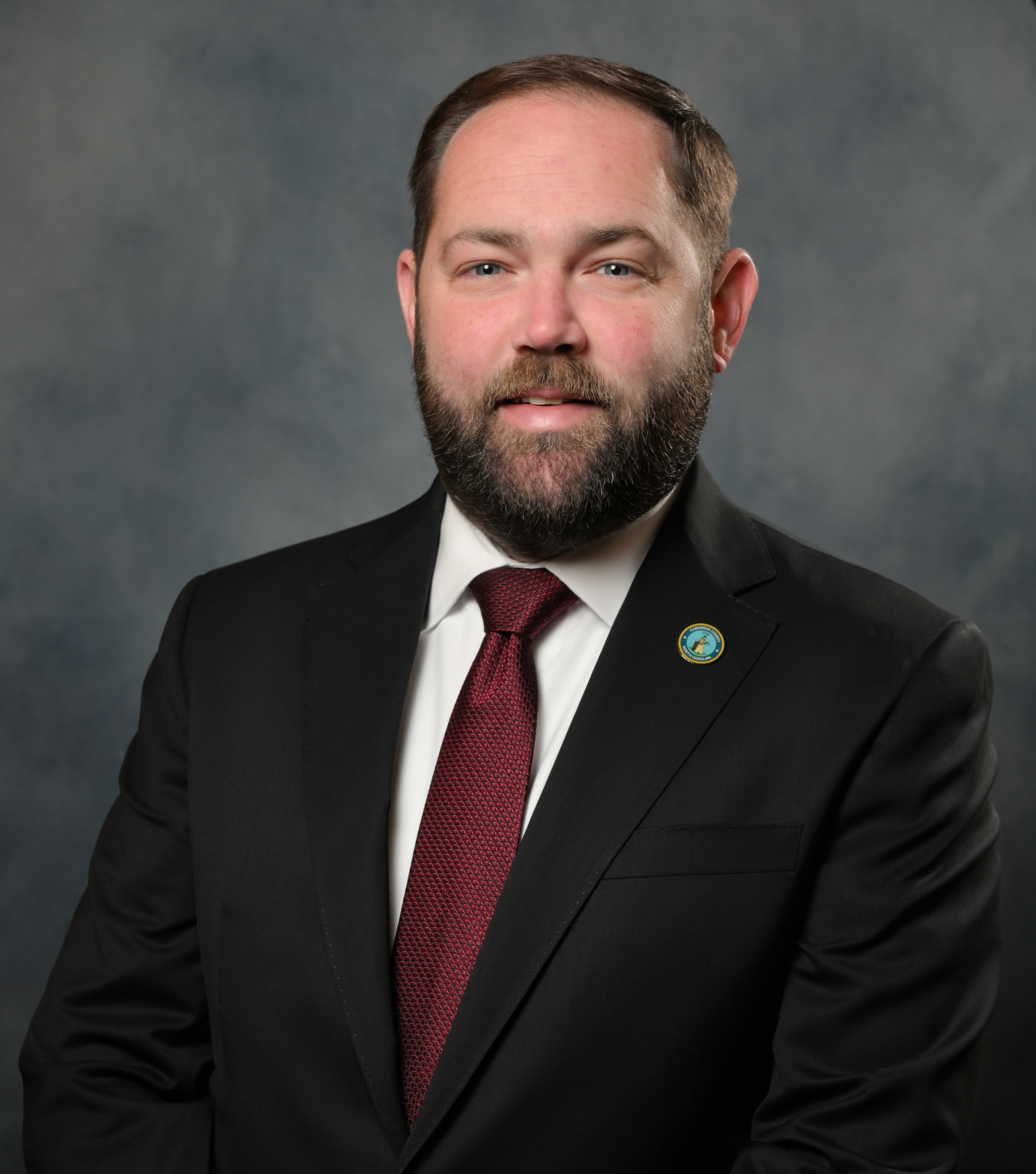

Member of the North Carolina Senate from the 34th district
- Incumbent
- Assumed office April 10, 2025
- Preceded by: Paul Newton

Personal details
- Party: Republican
- Education: Central Cabarrus High School and George Washington University

Christopher Allen Measmer is an American politician and businessman who is currently serving as a Republican member of the North Carolina Senate, representing the 34th district. The district is based in Cabarrus County. He was appointed to the seat on April 10, 2025 after the resignation of incumbent Paul Newton, who resigned in March.

== Personal life and career ==
Measmer graduated from Central Cabarrus High School and George Washington University, but has also studied in Greece and Italy. He is also a business owner. Measmer served on the Cabarrus County Commission for seven years prior to being appointed to the North Carolina Senate. He was also chairman of the commission prior to his resignation. He was succeeded on the commission by Jeff Jones following a weeks-long dispute over the seat.

== Political positions ==
=== Property taxes ===
Measmer has stated that he supports lower property taxes.

== Committee Assignments ==
2025–2026 Session

- Agriculture - Energy & Environment
- Appropriations - General Government & Information Technology
- Judiciary
- Regulation Reform
- State and Local Government
- Joint Legislative Committee on Local Government
- Joint Legislative Oversight Committee on General Government
- Ad-hoc work group committee to study property tax reforms

== Electoral History ==
=== 2026 ===
Cabarrus County Commission, Primary Election 2026
Party	Candidate	Votes	%
Republican	Chris Measmer		0.00%
Republican	Kevin Crutchfield		0.00%
Total votes			100%

=== 2022 ===
Cabarrus County Commission, General Election 2022
Party	Candidate	Votes	%
Republican	Lynn Shue	43,761	27.10%
Republican	Chris Measmer	43,245	26.78%
Republican	Kenny Wortman	40,798	25.26%
Democratic	Sabrina Berry	33,691	20.86%
Total votes		161,495	100%

Cabarrus County Commission, Republican Primary Election 2022
Party	Candidate	Votes	%
Republican	Chris Measmer	8,864	19.49%
Republican	Lynn Shue	6,739	14.82%
Republican	Kenny Wortman	6,485	14.26%
Republican	Ray Helms	5,888	12.94%
Republican	Alan Thompson	5,629	12.38%
Republican	Blake Kiger	5,297	11.65%
Republican	Holly Grimsley	4,758	10.46%
Republican	John Paul	1,825	4.01%
Total votes		45,485	100%

=== 2014 ===
Cabarrus County Commission, Republican Primary Election 2014
Party	Candidate	Votes	%
Republican	Diane Honeycutt	6,884	20.01%
Republican	Grace Mynatt	6,430	18.69%
Republican	Lynn Shue	5,879	17.09%
Republican	Chris Measmer	4,962	14.43%
Republican	Jason Oesterreich	4,638	13.48%
Republican	Larry M. Burrage	4,512	13.12%
Republican	Chad Nevada Mockerman	1,091	3.17%
Total votes		34,496	100%

=== 2010 ===
Cabarrus County Commission, General Election 2010
Party	Candidate	Votes	%
Republican	Chris Measmer	31,473	26.44%
Republican	Jay White	30,502	25.62%
Republican	Larry M. Burrage	29,894	25.11%
Democratic	Rick Brown	14,171	11.91%
Democratic	Jim Fulton	12,994	10.92%
Total votes		27,449	100%

Cabarrus County Commission, Republican Primary Election 2010
Party	Candidate	Votes	%
Republican	Chris Measmer	5,849	23.27%
Republican	Jay White	5,009	19.93%
Republican	Larry M. Burrage	4,012	15.96%
Republican	Christopher McCartan	3,412	13.57%
Republican	Thomas K. Sheppard	2,326	9.25%
Republican	Phil Cowherd	1,612	6.41%
Republican	Fred Eudy	1,481	5.89%
Republican	Jerry Conway	822	3.27%
Republican	Lloyd G. Morris	614	2.44%
Total votes		119,034	100%
