= North Carolina's 27th Senate district =

American legislative district

North Carolina's 27th State Senate district
Senator
Michael Garrett; D–Greensboro
- Demographics: 48% White; 30% Black; 10% Hispanic; 7% Asian; 1% Other; 4% Multiracial
- Population (2023): 204,950

North Carolina's 27th Senate district is one of 50 districts in the North Carolina Senate. It has been represented by Democrat Michael Garrett since 2019.

== Geography ==
Since 2003, the district has included part of Guilford County. The district overlaps with the 57th, 58th, 60th, 61st, and 62nd state house districts.

== District officeholders since 1973 ==
=== Multi-member district ===
Senator	Party	Dates	Notes	Senator	Party	Dates	Notes	Counties
Charles Taylor (Brevard)	Republican	January 1, 1973 – January 1, 1975		Elizabeth Wilkie (Fletcher)	Republican	January 1, 1973 – January 1, 1975		1973–1983; All of Clay, Cherokee, Graham, Macon, Swain, Jackson, Haywood, Transylvania, Henderson, and Polk Counties.
Cecil Hill (Brevard)	Democratic	January 1, 1975 – January 1, 1981		Joe Palmer (Clyde)	Democratic	January 1, 1975 – January 1, 1983		1973–1983; All of Clay, Cherokee, Graham, Macon, Swain, Jackson, Haywood, Transylvania, Henderson, and Polk Counties.
R. P. Thomas (Hendersonville)	Democratic	January 1, 1981 – January 1, 1983		Joe Palmer (Clyde)	Democratic	January 1, 1975 – January 1, 1983		1973–1983; All of Clay, Cherokee, Graham, Macon, Swain, Jackson, Haywood, Transylvania, Henderson, and Polk Counties.
Donald Kincaid (Lenoir)	Republican	January 1, 1983 – July 26, 1997	Resigned.	James Harrell Edwards (Hickory)	Democratic	January 1, 1983 – January 1, 1985		1983–1993; All of Wilkes, Caldwell, Burke, Avery, and Mitchell Counties.
Donald Kincaid (Lenoir)	Republican	January 1, 1983 – July 26, 1997	Resigned.	Daniel Simpson (Morganton)	Republican	January 1, 1985 – January 1, 1997		1983–1993; All of Wilkes, Caldwell, Burke, Avery, and Mitchell Counties.
Donald Kincaid (Lenoir)	Republican	January 1, 1983 – July 26, 1997	Resigned.	Daniel Simpson (Morganton)	Republican	January 1, 1985 – January 1, 1997		1993–2003; All of Yadkin, Wilkes, Alexander, Caldwell, Avery, and Mitchell counties. Part of Burke County.
Donald Kincaid (Lenoir)	Republican	January 1, 1983 – July 26, 1997	Resigned.	John Garwood (North Wilkesboro)	Republican	January 1, 1997 – January 1, 2003	Redistricted to the 30th district.	1993–2003; All of Yadkin, Wilkes, Alexander, Caldwell, Avery, and Mitchell counties. Part of Burke County.
Vacant		July 26, 1997 – August 5, 1997		John Garwood (North Wilkesboro)	Republican	January 1, 1997 – January 1, 2003	Redistricted to the 30th district.	1993–2003; All of Yadkin, Wilkes, Alexander, Caldwell, Avery, and Mitchell counties. Part of Burke County.
Kenneth Moore (Lenoir)	Republican	August 5, 1997 – January 1, 2003	Appointed to finish Kincaid's term. Redistricted to the 45th district and lost re-nomination.	John Garwood (North Wilkesboro)	Republican	January 1, 1997 – January 1, 2003	Redistricted to the 30th district.	1993–2003; All of Yadkin, Wilkes, Alexander, Caldwell, Avery, and Mitchell counties. Part of Burke County.

=== Single-member district ===
Senator	Party	Dates	Notes	Counties
Kay Hagan (Greensboro)	Democratic	January 1, 2003 – January 1, 2009	Redistricted from the 32nd district. Retired to run for U.S. Senator.	2003–Present; Part of Guilford County.
Don Vaughan (Greensboro)	Democratic	January 1, 2009 – January 1, 2013	Retired.	2003–Present; Part of Guilford County.
Trudy Wade (Greensboro)	Republican	January 1, 2013 – January 1, 2019	Lost re-election.	2003–Present; Part of Guilford County.
Michael Garrett (Greensboro)	Democratic	January 1, 2019 – Present		2003–Present; Part of Guilford County.

== Election results ==
=== 2024 ===
North Carolina Senate 27th district general election, 2024
Party	Candidate	Votes	%
Democratic	Michael Garrett (incumbent)	65,146	60.79%
Republican	Paul Schumacher	42,011	39.21%
Total votes		107,157	100%
Democratic hold			

=== 2022 ===
North Carolina Senate 27th district general election, 2022
Party	Candidate	Votes	%
Democratic	Michael Garrett (incumbent)	37,055	54.50%
Republican	Richard "Josh" Sessoms	30,932	45.50%
Total votes		67,987	100%
Democratic hold			

=== 2020 ===
North Carolina Senate 27th district general election, 2020
Party	Candidate	Votes	%
Democratic	Michael Garrett (incumbent)	67,287	54.32%
Republican	Sebastian King	56,575	45.68%
Total votes		123,862	100%
Democratic hold			

=== 2018 ===
North Carolina Senate 27th district general election, 2018
Party	Candidate	Votes	%
Democratic	Michael Garrett	45,205	50.52%
Republican	Trudy Wade (incumbent)	44,268	49.48%
Total votes		89,473	100%
Democratic gain from Republican			

=== 2016 ===
North Carolina Senate 27th district general election, 2016
Party	Candidate	Votes	%
Republican	Trudy Wade (incumbent)	54,512	53.32%
Democratic	Michael Garrett	47,731	46.68%
Total votes		102,243	100%
Republican hold			

=== 2014 ===
North Carolina Senate 27th district general election, 2014
Party	Candidate	Votes	%
Republican	Trudy Wade (incumbent)	46,814	100%
Total votes		46,814	100%
Republican hold			

=== 2012 ===
North Carolina Senate 27th district Republican primary election, 2012
Party	Candidate	Votes	%
Republican	Trudy Wade	13,272	53.91%
Republican	Justin C. Conrad	8,367	33.99%
Republican	Latimer B. Alexander IV	2,472	10.04%
Republican	Sal Leone	506	2.06%
Total votes		24,617	100%

North Carolina Senate 27th district general election, 2012
Party	Candidate	Votes	%
Republican	Trudy Wade	56,865	57.59%
Democratic	Myra Slone	41,870	42.41%
Total votes		98,735	100%
Republican gain from Democratic			

=== 2010 ===
North Carolina Senate 27th district general election, 2010
Party	Candidate	Votes	%
Democratic	Don Vaughan (incumbent)	30,161	59.66%
Republican	Jeffrey T. "Jeff" Hyde	20,398	40.34%
Total votes		50,559	100%
Democratic hold			

=== 2008 ===
North Carolina Senate 27th district general election, 2008
Party	Candidate	Votes	%
Democratic	Don Vaughan	59,609	68.75%
Republican	Joe Wilson	27,100	31.25%
Total votes		86,709	100%
Democratic hold			

=== 2006 ===
North Carolina Senate 27th district general election, 2006
Party	Candidate	Votes	%
Democratic	Kay Hagan (incumbent)	30,180	100%
Total votes		30,180	100%
Democratic hold			

=== 2004 ===
North Carolina Senate 27th district general election, 2004
Party	Candidate	Votes	%
Democratic	Kay Hagan (incumbent)	49,573	65.85%
Republican	Bobby Coffer	23,910	31.76%
Libertarian	Rusty Sheridan	1,797	2.39%
Total votes		75,280	100%
Democratic hold			

=== 2002 ===
North Carolina Senate 27th district general election, 2002
Party	Candidate	Votes	%
Democratic	Kay Hagan (incumbent)	28,170	56.16%
Republican	Mark McDaniel	20,714	41.30%
Libertarian	Tom Bailey	1,272	2.54%
Total votes		50,156	100%
Democratic hold			

=== 2000 ===
North Carolina Senate 27th district general election, 2000
Party	Candidate	Votes	%
Republican	Kenneth Moore (incumbent)	71,111	51.57%
Republican	John Garwood (incumbent)	66,771	48.43%
Total votes		137,882	100%
Republican hold			
Republican hold			
