= 2004 North Carolina Senate election =

- November 2, 2004

All 50 seats in the North Carolina Senate 26 (without Lieutenant Governor) seats needed for a majority
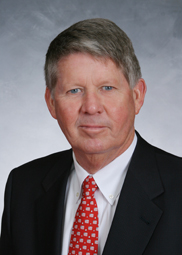

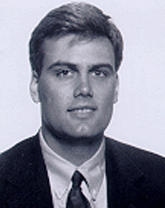
	Majority party	Minority party
Leader	Marc Basnight	Patrick J. Ballantine (retired)
Party	Democratic	Republican
Leader since	January 1, 1993	January 1, 1999
Leader's seat	1st - Manteo	9th - Wilmington
Last election	28	22
Seats won	29	21
Seat change	▲1	▼1
Popular vote	1,505,822	1,565,582
Percentage	48.15%	50.07%
- Results: Democratic hold Democratic gain Republican hold Republican gain
President pro tempore before election
Marc Basnight
Democratic
Elected President pro tempore
Marc Basnight
Democratic

The 2004 North Carolina Senate elections were held on November 2, 2004, to elect members to all fifty seats in the North Carolina Senate. The election coincided with the elections for other offices including the Presidency, U.S. Senate, Governorship, U.S. House of Representatives, Council of State, and state house. The primary election was held on July 20, 2004, with a primary run-off occurring on August 17, 2004. These elections were the first to use new district lines drawn by the General Assembly to account the for changes in population amongst each of the districts after the 2000 census. The 2002 election had been conducted under a map ordered by the North Carolina Superior Court.

== Results summary ==
District	Incumbent	Party	Elected	Party
1st	Marc Basnight	Dem	Marc Basnight	Dem
2nd	Scott Thomas	Dem	Scott Thomas	Dem
3rd	Clark Jenkins	Dem	Clark Jenkins	Dem
4th	Robert Lee Holloman	Dem	Robert Lee Holloman	Dem
5th	John Kerr (Note: Redistricted from the 7th district.)	Dem	John Kerr	Dem
5th	Tony Moore	Rep	John Kerr	Dem
6th	Cecil Hargett	Dem	Harry Brown	Rep
7th	New seat		Doug Berger	Dem
8th	R. C. Soles Jr.	Dem	R. C. Soles Jr.	Dem
9th	Woody White	Rep	Julia Boseman	Dem
10th	Charles Albertson	Dem	Charles Albertson	Dem
11th	A. B. Swindell	Dem	A. B. Swindell	Dem
12th	Fred Smith	Rep	Fred Smith	Rep
13th	David Weinstein	Dem	David Weinstein	Dem
14th	Vernon Malone	Dem	Vernon Malone	Dem
15th	John Carrington	Rep	Neal Hunt	Rep
16th	Eric Miller Reeves†	Dem	Janet Cowell	Dem
17th	Richard Y. Stevens	Rep	Richard Y. Stevens	Rep
18th	Ralph Hunt†	Dem	Bob Atwater	Dem
19th	Tony Rand	Dem	Tony Rand	Dem
20th	Jeanne Hopkins Lucas	Dem	Jeanne Hopkins Lucas	Dem
21st	Larry Shaw	Dem	Larry Shaw	Dem
22nd	Harris Blake	Rep	Harris Blake	Rep
23rd	Eleanor Kinnaird	Dem	Eleanor Kinnaird	Dem
24th	Hugh Webster	Rep	Hugh Webster	Rep
25th	Bill Purcell	Dem	Bill Purcell	Dem
26th	Phil Berger	Rep	Phil Berger	Rep
27th	Kay Hagan	Dem	Kay Hagan	Dem
28th	Katie G. Dorsett	Dem	Katie G. Dorsett	Dem
29th	Jerry W. Tillman	Rep	Jerry W. Tillman	Rep
30th	New seat		Don W. East	Rep
31st	Hamilton Horton Jr.	Rep	Hamilton Horton Jr.	Rep
32nd	Linda Garrou	Dem	Linda Garrou	Dem
33rd	Stan Bingham	Rep	Stan Bingham	Rep
34th	Andrew C. Brock	Rep	Andrew C. Brock	Rep
35th	Fern Shubert†	Rep	Eddie Goodall	Rep
36th	Fletcher L. Hartsell Jr.	Rep	Fletcher L. Hartsell Jr.	Rep
37th	Dan Clodfelter	Dem	Dan Clodfelter	Dem
38th	Charlie Dannelly	Dem	Charlie Dannelly	Dem
39th	Robert Pittenger (Note: Redistricted from the 40th district.)	Rep	Robert Pittenger	Rep
39th	Bob Rucho†	Rep	Robert Pittenger	Rep
40th	New seat		Malcolm Graham	Dem
41st	James Forrester (Note: Redistricted from the 42nd district.)	Rep	James Forrester	Rep
41st	R. B. Sloan Jr.	Rep	James Forrester	Rep
42nd	Austin M. Allran (Note: Redistricted from the 44th district.)	Rep	Austin M. Allran	Rep
43rd	David W. Hoyle	Dem	David W. Hoyle	Dem
44th	New seat		Jim Jacumin	Rep
45th	John Garwood (Note: Redistricted from the 30th district.)	Rep	John Garwood	Rep
45th	Virginia Foxx†	Rep	John Garwood	Rep
46th	Walter Dalton	Dem	Walter Dalton	Dem
47th	Joe Sam Queen	Dem	Keith Presnell	Rep
48th	Tom Apodaca	Rep	Tom Apodaca	Rep
49th	Martin Nesbitt	Dem	Martin Nesbitt	Dem
50th	Bob Carpenter	Rep	John Snow	Dem

† - Incumbent not seeking re-election

Party	Candi- dates	Votes		Seats		
Party	Candi- dates	No.	%	No.	+/–	%
Democratic	42	1,505,822	48.155%	29	▲1	58%
Republican	42	1,565,582	50.066%	21	▼1	42%
Libertarian	12	46,960	1.502%	0	Steady	0%
Write-ins	2	8,687	0.278%	0	Steady	0%
Total	98	3,127,051	100.00%	50	Steady	100.00%

Senate seats
Democratic	58%
Republican	42%

Popular vote
Republican	50.07%
Democratic	48.15%
Libertarian	1.50%
Write-ins	0.28%

=== Incumbents defeated in primary election ===
- John Carrington (R-District 15), defeated by Neal Hunt (R)

=== Incumbents defeated in general election ===
- Cecil Hargett (D-District 6), defeated by Harry Brown (R)
- Joe Sam Queen (D-District 47), defeated by Keith Presnell (R)
- Bob Carpenter (R-District 50), defeated by John Snow (D)

=== Newly created seats ===
- District 7, won by Doug Berger (D)
- District 30, won by Don W. East (R)
- District 40, won by Malcolm Graham (D)
- District 44, won by Jim Jacumin (R)

=== Seats eliminated by redistricting ===
- Tony Moore (R-District 5) lost a redistricting race to John Kerr (D)
- Bob Rucho (R-District 39) didn't seek re-election after the 40th district was merged with his district
- R. B. Sloan Jr. (R-District 41) lost re-nomination to James Forrester (R-District 42) after the 42nd district was merged with the 41st district
- Virginia Foxx (R-District 45) ran for the U.S. House after the 30th district was merged with her district.

== Predictions ==
Source	Ranking	As of
Rothenberg	Lean D	October 1, 2004

== Detailed results ==
=== Districts 1–25 ===
==== District 1 ====
Incumbent Democratic president pro tempore Marc Basnight has represented the 1st district since 1985.

North Carolina Senate 1st district general election, 2004
Party	Candidate	Votes	%
Democratic	Marc Basnight (incumbent)	45,367	64.69%
Republican	Ron Toppin	24,759	35.31%
Total votes		70,126	100%
Democratic hold			

==== District 2 ====
Incumbent Democrat Scott Thomas has represented the 2nd district and its predecessors since 2001.

North Carolina Senate 2nd district general election, 2004
Party	Candidate	Votes	%
Democratic	Scott Thomas (incumbent)	37,123	54.46%
Republican	Chuck Tyson	29,966	43.96%
Libertarian	Richard C. Evey	1,073	1.57%
Total votes		68,162	100%
Democratic hold			

==== District 3 ====
Incumbent Democrat Clark Jenkins has represented the 3rd district since 2003.

North Carolina Senate 3rd district general election, 2004
Party	Candidate	Votes	%
Democratic	Clark Jenkins (incumbent)	36,343	66.04%
Republican	Beverly Moore	18,686	33.96%
Total votes		55,029	100%
Democratic hold			

==== District 4 ====
Incumbent Democrat Robert Lee Holloman has represented the 4th district since 2003.

North Carolina Senate 4th district general election, 2004
Party	Candidate	Votes	%
Democratic	Robert Lee Holloman (incumbent)	44,249	100%
Total votes		44,249	100%
Democratic hold			

==== District 5 ====
The new 5th district includes the homes of Incumbent Democrat turned Republican Tony Moore, who has represented the 5th district since 2003 and Incumbent Democrat John Kerr, who has represented the 7th district and its predecessors since 1993. Kerr defeated Moore in the general election.

North Carolina Senate 5th district general election, 2004
Party	Candidate	Votes	%
Democratic	John Kerr (incumbent)	34,162	56.80%
Republican	Tony Moore (incumbent)	25,987	43.20%
Total votes		60,149	100%
Democratic hold			

==== District 6 ====
Incumbent Democrat Cecil Hargett has represented the 6th district since 2003. Hargett lost re-election to Republican Harry Brown.

North Carolina Senate 6th district general election, 2004
Party	Candidate	Votes	%
Republican	Harry Brown	21,624	52.38%
Democratic	Cecil Hargett (incumbent)	18,514	44.84%
Libertarian	Mathew Tillman	1,148	2.78%
Total votes		41,286	100%
Republican gain from Democratic			

==== District 7 ====
The new 7th district includes all of Franklin, Granville, Vance, and Warren Counties. Democrat Doug Berger won the open seat.

North Carolina Senate 7th district general election, 2004
Party	Candidate	Votes	%
Democratic	Doug Berger	35,091	56.87%
Republican	Harold N. Frazier	26,616	43.13%
Total votes		61,707	100%
Democratic win (new seat)			

==== District 8 ====
Incumbent Democrat R. C. Soles Jr. has represented the 8th district and its predecessors since 1977.

North Carolina Senate 8th district general election, 2004
Party	Candidate	Votes	%
Democratic	R. C. Soles Jr. (incumbent)	39,897	54.26%
Republican	Jack Swann	33,627	45.74%
Total votes		73,524	100%
Democratic hold			

==== District 9 ====
Incumbent Republican Minority Leader Patrick J. Ballantine had represented the 9th district and its predecessors since 1995. Ballantine ran for governor and resigned his seat on April 20, 2004. Fellow Republican Woody White was appointed to replace him on May 5, 2004. White ran for re-election to a full term, but he lost re-election to Democrat Julia Boseman.

North Carolina Senate 9th district general election, 2004
Party	Candidate	Votes	%
Democratic	Julia Boseman	40,486	50.55%
Republican	Woody White (incumbent)	39,601	49.45%
Total votes		80,087	100%
Democratic gain from Republican			

==== District 10 ====
Incumbent Democrat Charles Albertson has represented the 10th district and its predecessors since 1993.

North Carolina Senate 10th district general election, 2004
Party	Candidate	Votes	%
Democratic	Charles Albertson (incumbent)	37,570	61.97%
Republican	Rich Jarman	23,054	38.03%
Total votes		60,624	100%
Democratic hold			

==== District 11 ====
Incumbent Democrat A. B. Swindell has represented the 11th district and its predecessors since 2001.

North Carolina Senate 11th district general election, 2004
Party	Candidate	Votes	%
Democratic	A. B. Swindell (incumbent)	40,234	60.37%
Republican	Dennis Nielsen	26,417	39.63%
Total votes		66,651	100%
Democratic hold			

==== District 12 ====
Incumbent Republican Fred Smith has represented the 12th district since 2003.

North Carolina Senate 12th district general election, 2004
Party	Candidate	Votes	%
Republican	Fred Smith (incumbent)	48,674	100%
Total votes		48,674	100%
Republican hold			

==== District 13 ====
Incumbent Democrat David Weinstein has represented the 13th district and its predecessors since 1997.

North Carolina Senate 13th district general election, 2004
Party	Candidate	Votes	%
Democratic	David Weinstein (incumbent)	37,829	100%
Total votes		37,829	100%
Democratic hold			

==== District 14 ====
incumbent Democrat Vernon Malone has represented the 14th district since 2003.

North Carolina Senate 14th district general election, 2004
Party	Candidate	Votes	%
Democratic	Vernon Malone (incumbent)	45,727	64.11%
Republican	John Odoom	25,595	35.89%
Total votes		71,322	100%
Democratic hold			

==== District 15 ====
Incumbent Republican John Carrington has represented the 15th district and its predecessors since 1995. Carrington lost re-nomination to fellow Republican Neal Hunt, who won the general election.

North Carolina Senate 15th district general election, 2004
Party	Candidate	Votes	%
Republican	Neal Hunt	59,970	84.58%
Libertarian	Lee Griffin	10,934	15.42%
Total votes		70,904	100%
Republican hold			

==== District 16 ====
Incumbent Democrat Eric Miller Reeves has represented the 16th district and its predecessors since 1997. Reeves retired and Democrat Janet Cowell won the open seat.

North Carolina Senate 16th district general election, 2004
Party	Candidate	Votes	%
Democratic	Janet Cowell	45,396	59.44%
Republican	Mark A. Bradick	28,995	37.97%
Libertarian	Jason P. Mara	1,979	2.59%
Total votes		76,370	100%
Democratic hold			

==== District 17 ====
Incumbent Republican Richard Y. Stevens has represented the 17th district since 2003.

North Carolina Senate 17th district general election, 2004
Party	Candidate	Votes	%
Republican	Richard Y. Stevens (incumbent)	55,908	58.74%
Democratic	Norwood Clark	37,432	39.33%
Libertarian	Ryan Maas	1,844	1.94%
Total votes		95,184	100%
Republican hold			

==== District 18 ====
Incumbent Democrat Wib Gulley, who had represented the 18th district and its predecessors since 1993, resigned on March 19, 2004. Ralph Alexander Hunt was appointed to finish Hunt's term on April 21, 2004. Hunt didn't seek a full term and Democrat Bob Atwater won the open seat.

North Carolina Senate 18th district general election, 2004
Party	Candidate	Votes	%
Democratic	Bob Atwater	46,875	58.04%
Republican	Christine Mumma	32,709	40.50%
Libertarian	Jon Guze	1,186	1.47%
Total votes		80,770	100%
Democratic hold			

==== District 19 ====
Incumbent Democratic Majority Leader Tony Rand has represented the 19th district and its predecessors since 1995.

North Carolina Senate 19th district general election, 2004
Party	Candidate	Votes	%
Democratic	Tony Rand (incumbent)	43,413	100%
Total votes		43,413	100%
Democratic hold			

==== District 20 ====
Incumbent Democrat Jeanne Hopkins Lucas has represented the 20th district and its predecessors since 1993.

North Carolina Senate 20th district general election, 2004
Party	Candidate	Votes	%
Democratic	Jeanne Hopkins Lucas (incumbent)	55,050	90.24%
Libertarian	Ray Ubinger	5,953	9.76%
Total votes		61,003	100%
Democratic hold			

==== District 21 ====
Incumbent Democrat Larry Shaw has represented the 21st district and its predecessors since 1995.

North Carolina Senate 21st district general election, 2004
Party	Candidate	Votes	%
Democratic	Larry Shaw (incumbent)	27,866	61.21%
Republican	Richard D. Evans	16,434	36.10%
Libertarian	Brian Irving	1,225	2.69%
Total votes		45,525	100%
Democratic hold			

==== District 22 ====
Incumbent Republican Harris Blake has represented the 22nd district since 2003.

North Carolina Senate 22nd district general election, 2004
Party	Candidate	Votes	%
Republican	Harris Blake (incumbent)	35,605	51.73%
Democratic	Oscar Harris	33,229	48.27%
Total votes		68,834	100%
Republican hold			

==== District 23 ====
Incumbent Democrat Eleanor Kinnaird has represented the 23rd district and its predecessors since 1997.

North Carolina Senate 23rd district general election, 2004
Party	Candidate	Votes	%
Democratic	Eleanor Kinnaird (incumbent)	49,730	65.40%
Republican	Robert E. "Whit" Whitfield	26,307	34.60%
Total votes		76,037	100%
Democratic hold			

==== District 24 ====
Incumbent Republican Hugh Webster has represented the 24th district since 1995.

North Carolina Senate 24th district general election, 2004
Party	Candidate	Votes	%
Republican	Hugh Webster (incumbent)	35,989	57.94%
Democratic	Tony Foriest	26,127	42.06%
Total votes		62,116	100%
Republican hold			

==== District 25 ====
Incumbent Democrat Bill Purcell has represented the 25th district and its predecessors since 1997.

North Carolina Senate 25th district general election, 2004
Party	Candidate	Votes	%
Democratic	Bill Purcell (incumbent)	37,319	81.53%
Independent	Jerry Lineau Gattis (write-in)	8,457	18.47%
Total votes		45,776	100%
Democratic hold			

=== Districts 26–50 ===
==== District 26 ====
Incumbent Republican Phil Berger has represented the 26th district and its predecessors since 2001.

North Carolina Senate 26th district general election, 2004
Party	Candidate	Votes	%
Republican	Phil Berger (incumbent)	59,618	100%
Total votes		59,618	100%
Republican hold			

==== District 27 ====
Incumbent Democrat Kay Hagan has represented the 27th district and its predecessors since 1999.

North Carolina Senate 27th district general election, 2004
Party	Candidate	Votes	%
Democratic	Kay Hagan (incumbent)	49,573	65.85%
Republican	Bobby Coffer	23,910	31.76%
Libertarian	Rusty Sheridan	1,797	2.39%
Total votes		75,280	100%
Democratic hold			

==== District 28 ====
Incumbent Democrat Katie G. Dorsett has represented the 28th district since 2003.

2008 North Carolina Senate District 28th district general election, 2004
Party	Candidate	Votes	%
Democratic	Katie G. Dorsett (incumbent)	47,583	100%
Total votes		47,583	100%
Democratic hold			

==== District 29 ====
Incumbent Republican Jerry W. Tillman has represented the 29th district since 2003.

North Carolina Senate 29th district general election, 2004
Party	Candidate	Votes	%
Republican	Jerry W. Tillman (incumbent)	42,292	70.56%
Democratic	Charles K. Moss	17,644	29.44%
Total votes		59,936	100%
Republican hold			

==== District 30 ====
The new 30th district includes all of Alleghany, Stokes, Surry, and Yadkin counties and has no incumbent. Republican Don W. East won the open seat.

North Carolina Senate 30th district general election, 2004
Party	Candidate	Votes	%
Republican	Don W. East	40,611	64.67%
Democratic	Melvin T. Jackson	22,188	35.33%
Total votes		62,799	100%
Republican win (new seat)			

==== District 31 ====
Incumbent Republican Hamilton Horton Jr. has represented the 31st district and its predecessors since 1995.

North Carolina Senate 31st district general election, 2004
Party	Candidate	Votes	%
Republican	Hamilton Horton Jr. (incumbent)	62,098	100%
Total votes		62,098	100%
Republican hold			

==== District 32 ====
Incumbent Democrat Linda Garrou has represented the 32nd district and its predecessors since 1999.

North Carolina Senate 32nd district general election, 2004
Party	Candidate	Votes	%
Democratic	Linda Garrou (incumbent)	38,903	69.69%
Republican	W. R. "Bill" Dowe	16,920	30.31%
Total votes		55,823	100%
Democratic hold			

==== District 33 ====
Incumbent Republican Stan Bingham has represented the 33rd district and its predecessors since 2001.

North Carolina Senate 33rd district general election, 2004
Party	Candidate	Votes	%
Republican	Stan Bingham (incumbent)	54,801	100%
Total votes		54,801	100%
Republican hold			

==== District 34 ====
Incumbent Republican Andrew C. Brock has represented the 34th district since 2003.

North Carolina Senate 34th district general election, 2004
Party	Candidate	Votes	%
Republican	Andrew C. Brock (incumbent)	41,800	63.31%
Democratic	Larry C. Brown	24,223	36.69%
Total votes		66,023	100%
Republican hold			

==== District 35 ====
Incumbent Republican Fern Shubert has represented the 35th district since 2003. Shubert ran for governor. Fellow Republican Eddie Goodall won the open seat.

North Carolina Senate District 35th district general election, 2004
Party	Candidate	Votes	%
Republican	Eddie Goodall	55,204	99.59%
Independent	Cornelius F. "Neal" Brantley Jr. (write-in)	230	0.41%
Total votes		55,434	100%
Republican hold			

==== District 36 ====
Incumbent Republican Fletcher L. Hartsell Jr. has represented the 36th district and its predecessors since 1991.

North Carolina Senate 36th district general election, 2004
Party	Candidate	Votes	%
Republican	Fletcher L. Hartsell Jr. (incumbent)	46,848	81.42%
Libertarian	Mike Helms	10,692	18.58%
Total votes		57,540	100%
Republican hold			

==== District 37 ====
Incumbent Democrat Dan Clodfelter has represented the 37th district and its predecessors since 1999.

North Carolina Senate 37th district general election, 2004
Party	Candidate	Votes	%
Democratic	Dan Clodfelter (incumbent)	40,902	100%
Total votes		40,902	100%
Democratic hold			

==== District 38 ====
Incumbent Democrat Charlie Dannelly has represented the 38th district and its predecessors since 1995.

North Carolina Senate 38th district general election, 2004
Party	Candidate	Votes	%
Democratic	Charlie Dannelly (incumbent)	47,898	100%
Total votes		47,898	100%
Democratic hold			

==== District 39 ====
The new 39th district includes the homes of incumbent Republicans Bob Rucho, who has represented the 39th district and its predecessors since 1997, and Robert Pittenger, who has represented the 40th district since 2003. Rucho retired and Pittenger was elected here.

North Carolina Senate 39th district general election, 2004
Party	Candidate	Votes	%
Republican	Robert Pittenger (incumbent)	64,948	89.08%
Libertarian	Andy Grum	7,965	10.92%
Total votes		72,913	100%
Republican hold			

==== District 40 ====
The new 40th district is based in Mecklenburg County and had no incumbent. Democrat Malcolm Graham won the open seat.

North Carolina Senate 40th district general election, 2004
Party	Candidate	Votes	%
Democratic	Malcolm Graham	42,096	57.88%
Republican	Brian Sisson	30,633	42.12%
Total votes		72,729	100%
Democratic win (new seat)			

==== District 41 ====
The new 41st district includes the homes of incumbent Republicans R. B. Sloan Jr., who has represented the 41st district since 2003, and James Forrester, who has represented the 42nd district and its predecessors since 1991. Forrester defeated Sloan in the Republican primary and was re-elected here.

North Carolina Senate 41st district general election, 2004
Party	Candidate	Votes	%
Republican	James Forrester (incumbent)	50,458	68.93%
Democratic	Rita W. McElwaine	22,741	31.07%
Total votes		73,199	100%
Republican hold			

==== District 42 ====
The new 42nd district overlaps with much of the former 44th district. Incumbent Republican Austin M. Allran, who has represented the 44th district and its predecessors since 1987, was re-elected here.

North Carolina Senate 42nd district general election, 2004
Party	Candidate	Votes	%
Republican	Austin M. Allran (incumbent)	51,623	100%
Total votes		51,623	100%
Republican hold			

==== District 43 ====
Incumbent Democrat David W. Hoyle has represented the 43rd district and its predecessors since 1993.

North Carolina Senate 43rd district general election, 2004
Party	Candidate	Votes	%
Democratic	David W. Hoyle (incumbent)	28,264	53.76%
Republican	Russell Fleming	24,311	46.24%
Total votes		52,575	100%
Democratic hold			

==== District 44 ====
The new 44th district includes all of Burke and Caldwell counties and has no incumbent. Republican Jim Jacumin won the open seat.

North Carolina 44th district general election, 2004
Party	Candidate	Votes	%
Republican	Jim Jacumin	38,567	61.54%
Democratic	Richard Cornwell Avery	24,100	38.46%
Total votes		62,667	100%
Republican win (new seat)			

==== District 45 ====
The new 45th district includes the homes of Incumbent Republicans Virginia Foxx, who has represented the 45th district and its predecessors since 1995, and John Garwood, who has represented the 30th district and its predecessors since 1997. Foxx ran for the U.S. House and Garwood was re-elected here.

North Carolina Senate 45th district general election, 2004
Party	Candidate	Votes	%
Republican	John Garwood (incumbent)	47,005	61.69%
Democratic	Jim Cain	29,192	38.31%
Total votes		76,197	100%
Republican hold			

==== District 46 ====
Incumbent Democrat Walter Dalton has represented the 46th district and its predecessors since 1997.

North Carolina Senate 46th district general election, 2004
Party	Candidate	Votes	%
Democratic	Walter Dalton (incumbent)	32,595	53.43%
Republican	James "Jim" Testa	28,409	46.57%
Total votes		61,004	100%
Democratic hold			

==== District 47 ====
Incumbent Democrat Joe Sam Queen has represented the 47th district since 2003. Queen lost re-election to Republican Keith Presnell.

North Carolina Senate 47th district general election, 2004
Party	Candidate	Votes	%
Republican	Keith Presnell	37,791	52.56%
Democratic	Joe Sam Queen (incumbent)	34,115	47.44%
Total votes		71,906	100%
Republican gain from Democratic			

==== District 48 ====
Incumbent Republican Tom Apodaca has represented the 48th district since 2003.

North Carolina Senate 48th district general election, 2004
Party	Candidate	Votes	%
Republican	Tom Apodaca (incumbent)	47,832	61.99%
Democratic	Matthew C. Rogers	29,327	38.01%
Total votes		77,159	100%
Republican hold			

==== District 49 ====
Incumbent Democrat Martin Nesbitt has represented the 49th district since his appointment in 2004. Nesbitt was elected to a full term.

North Carolina Senate 49th district general election, 2004
Party	Candidate	Votes	%
Democratic	Martin Nesbitt (incumbent)	43,727	61.40%
Republican	R. L. Clark	27,492	38.60%
Total votes		71,669	100%
Democratic hold			

==== District 50 ====
Incumbent Republican Bob Carpenter has represented the 50th district and its predecessors since 1989. Carpenter lost re-election to Democrat John Snow.

North Carolina Senate 50th district general election, 2004
Party	Candidate	Votes	%
Democratic	John Snow	35,722	49.39%
Republican	Bob Carpenter (incumbent)	35,438	49.00%
Libertarian	Ben Lamm	1,164	1.61%
Total votes		72,324	100%
Democratic gain from Republican			

== See also ==
- List of North Carolina state legislatures
