= 2012 North Carolina Senate election =

- November 6, 2012

All 50 seats in the North Carolina State Senate
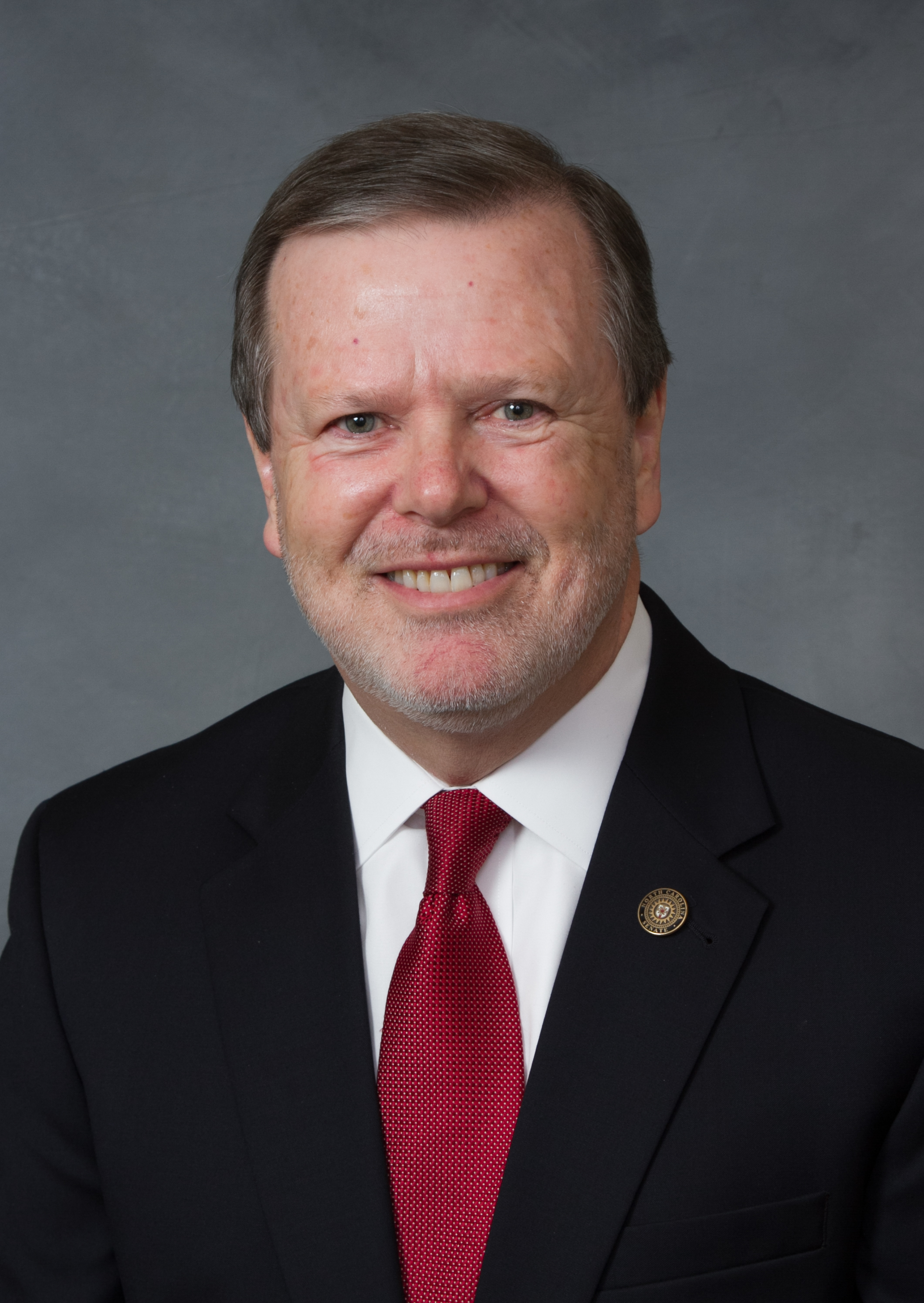

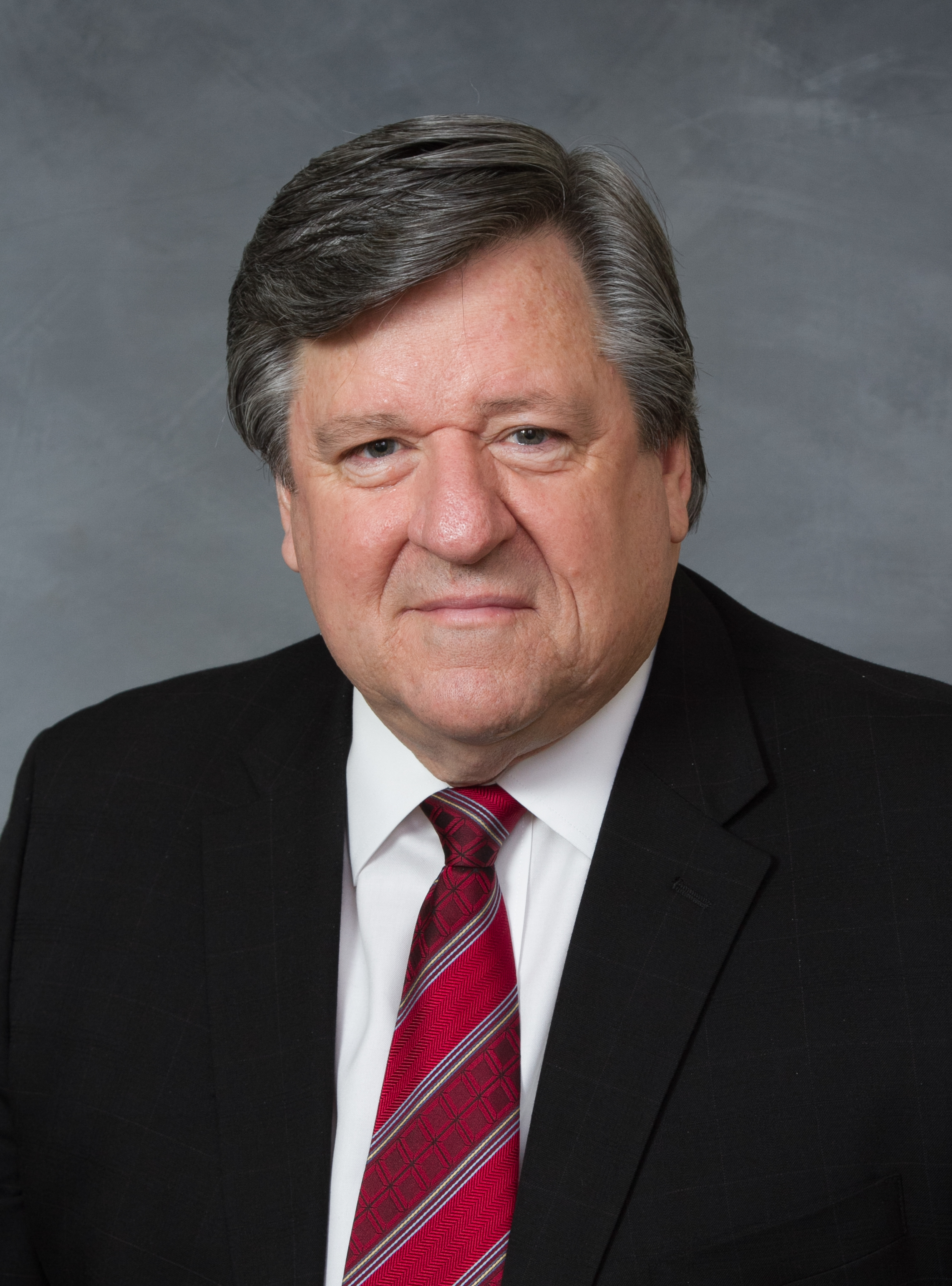
	Majority party	Minority party
Leader	Phil Berger	Martin Nesbitt
Party	Republican	Democratic
Leader since	January 1, 2005	January 1, 2011
Leader's seat	District 26	District 49
Seats before	31	19
Seats after	33	17
Seat change	▲2	▼2
- Results: Democratic hold Democratic gain Republican hold Republican gain
President pro tempore before election
Phil Berger
Republican
President pro tempore-designate
Phil Berger
Republican

The 2012 North Carolina State Senate elections selected members to serve in the North Carolina Senate for a two-year term commencing in January 2013. Going into the election, the Senate had 31 Republican and 19 Democratic members, which constituted a two-thirds super-majority for the Republican Party. Following the election, the Senate had 33 Republican and 17 Democratic members.

== Results summary ==
District	Incumbent	Party	Elected	Party
1st	Stan White	Dem	Bill Cook	Rep
2nd	Jean Preston†	Rep	Norman W. Sanderson	Rep
3rd	Clark Jenkins	Dem	Clark Jenkins	Dem
4th	Edward Jones	Dem	Edward Jones	Dem
5th	New seat		Don Davis	Dem
6th	Harry Brown	Rep	Harry Brown	Rep
7th	Louis M. Pate Jr. (Note: Redistricted from the 5th district.)	Rep	Louis M. Pate Jr.	Rep
8th	Bill Rabon	Rep	Bill Rabon	Rep
9th	Thom Goolsby	Rep	Thom Goolsby	Rep
10th	Brent Jackson	Rep	Brent Jackson	Rep
11th	Buck Newton	Rep	Buck Newton	Rep
12th	David Rouzer†	Rep	Ronald Rabin	Rep
13th	Michael Walters	Dem	Michael Walters	Dem
14th	Dan Blue	Dem	Dan Blue	Dem
15th	Neal Hunt	Rep	Neal Hunt	Rep
16th	Josh Stein	Dem	Josh Stein	Dem
17th	Tamara P. Barringer	Rep	Tamara P. Barringer	Rep
18th	Doug Berger (Note: Redistricted from the 7th district.)	Dem	Chad Barefoot	Rep
19th	Wesley Meredith	Rep	Wesley Meredith	Rep
20th	Floyd McKissick Jr.	Dem	Floyd McKissick Jr.	Dem
21st	Eric Mansfield†	Dem	Ben Clark	Dem
22nd	New seat		Mike Woodard	Dem
23rd	Eleanor Kinnaird	Dem	Eleanor Kinnaird	Dem
23rd	Bob Atwater† (Note: Redistricted from the 18th district.)	Dem	Eleanor Kinnaird	Dem
24th	Rick Gunn	Rep	Rick Gunn	Rep
25th	William R. Purcell†	Dem	Gene McLaurin	Dem
26th	Phil Berger	Rep	Phil Berger	Rep
27th	Don Vaughan†	Dem	Trudy Wade	Rep
28th	Gladys A. Robinson	Dem	Gladys A. Robinson	Dem
29th	Jerry W. Tillman	Rep	Jerry W. Tillman	Rep
29th	Harris Blake† (Note: Redistricted from the 22nd district.)	Rep	Jerry W. Tillman	Rep
30th	Don W. East	Rep	Don W. East	Rep
31st	Pete Brunstetter	Rep	Pete Brunstetter	Rep
32nd	Linda Garrou†	Dem	Earline Parmon	Dem
33rd	Stan Bingham	Rep	Stan Bingham	Rep
34th	Andrew C. Brock	Rep	Andrew C. Brock	Rep
35th	Tommy Tucker	Rep	Tommy Tucker	Rep
36th	Fletcher L. Hartsell Jr.	Rep	Fletcher L. Hartsell Jr.	Rep
37th	Dan Clodfelter	Dem	Dan Clodfelter	Dem
38th	Charlie Dannelly†	Dem	Joel Ford	Dem
39th	Bob Rucho	Rep	Bob Rucho	Rep
40th	Malcolm Graham	Dem	Malcolm Graham	Dem
41st	New seat		Jeff Tarte	Rep
42nd	Austin M. Allran	Rep	Austin M. Allran	Rep
43rd	Kathy Harrington	Rep	Kathy Harrington	Rep
44th	Chris Carney (Note: Redistricted from the 41st district.)	Rep	David L. Curtis	Rep
45th	Dan Soucek	Rep	Dan Soucek	Rep
46th	Warren Daniel (Note: Redistricted from the 44th district.)	Rep	Warren Daniel	Rep
46th	Wes Westmoreland†	Rep	Warren Daniel	Rep
47th	Ralph Hise	Rep	Ralph Hise	Rep
48th	Tom Apodaca	Rep	Tom Apodaca	Rep
49th	Martin Nesbitt	Dem	Martin Nesbitt	Dem
50th	Jim Davis	Rep	Jim Davis	Rep

† - Incumbent not seeking re-election

=== Incumbents defeated in primary election ===
- Chris Carney (R-District 44), defeated by David L. Curtis (R)

=== Incumbents defeated in general election ===
- Stan White (D-District 1), defeated by Bill Cook (R)
- Doug Berger (D-District 18), defeated by Chad Barefoot (R)

=== Open seats that changed parties ===
- Don Vaughan (D-District 27) did not seek re-election, seat won by Trudy Wade (R)

=== Newly created seats ===
- District 5, won by Don Davis (D)
- District 22, won by Mike Woodard (D)
- District 41, won by Jeff Tarte (R)

=== Seats eliminated by redistricting ===
- Bob Atwater (D-District 18) did not seek re-election after his seat was merged with 23rd district
- Harris Blake (R-District 22) did not seek re-election after his seat was merged with the 29th district
- Wes Westmoreland (R-District 46) did not seek re-election after his seat was merged with the 44th district

== Predictions ==
Source	Ranking	As of
Governing	Likely R	October 24, 2012

== Detailed results ==
=== Districts 1–25 ===
==== District 1 ====
Incumbent Democrat Stan M. White has represented the 1st district since 2011.

North Carolina Senate 1st district general election, 2012
Party	Candidate	Votes	%
Republican	Bill Cook	43,735	50.01%
Democratic	Stan White (incumbent)	43,714	49.99%
Total votes		87,449	100%
Republican gain from Democratic			

==== District 2 ====
Incumbent Republican Jean Preston has represented the 2nd district since 2007. Preston did not seek re-election. Representative Norman W. Sanderson won the open seat.

North Carolina Senate 2nd district general election, 2012
Party	Candidate	Votes	%
Republican	Norman W. Sanderson	53,873	63.12%
Democratic	Greg Muse	31,479	36.88%
Total votes		85,352	100%
Republican hold			

==== District 3 ====
Incumbent Democrat Clark Jenkins has represented the 3rd district since 2003.

North Carolina Senate 3rd district general election, 2012
Party	Candidate	Votes	%
Democratic	Clark Jenkins (incumbent)	65,851	100%
Total votes		65,851`	100%
Democratic hold			

==== District 4 ====
Incumbent Democrat Edward Jones has represented the 4th district since 2007.

North Carolina Senate 4th district general election, 2012
Party	Candidate	Votes	%
Democratic	Edward Jones (incumbent)	63,666	72.32%
Republican	Warren Scott Nail	24,363	27.68%
Total votes		88,029	100%
Democratic hold			

==== District 5 ====
The 5th district is an open seat that includes Democratic leaning areas in Greene, Pitt, Lenoir, and Wayne counties. Democrat Don Davis who represented a different version of the 5th district from 2009 to 2011 won the open seat.

North Carolina Senate 5th district general election, 2012
Party	Candidate	Votes	%
Democratic	Don Davis	59,648	100%
Total votes		59,648	100%
Democratic win (new seat)			

==== District 6 ====
Incumbent Republican Majority Leader Harry Brown has represented the 6th district since 2004.

North Carolina Senate 6th district general election, 2012
Party	Candidate	Votes	%
Republican	Harry Brown (incumbent)	38,572	100%
Total votes		38,572	100%
Republican hold			

==== District 7 ====
The new 7th district is the successor to the old 5th district, but it has been drawn to be more Republican leaning than its predecessor. It now includes mostly Republican leaning areas in Pitt, Lenoir, and Wayne counties. Incumbent Republican Louis M. Pate Jr., who has represented the 5th district since 2011, successfully sought re-election here.

North Carolina Senate 7th district general election, 2012
Party	Candidate	Votes	%
Republican	Louis M. Pate Jr. (incumbent)	60,120	100%
Total votes		60,120	100%
Republican hold			

==== District 8 ====
Incumbent Republican Bill Rabon has represented the 8th district since 2011.

North Carolina Senate 8th district general election, 2012
Party	Candidate	Votes	%
Republican	Bill Rabon (incumbent)	58,282	59.96%
Democratic	Danny Hefner	38,919	40.04%
Total votes		97,201	100%
Republican hold			

==== District 9 ====
Incumbent Republican Thom Goolsby has represented the 9th district since 2011.

North Carolina Senate 9th district general election, 2012
Party	Candidate	Votes	%
Republican	Thom Goolsby (incumbent)	52,955	54.16%
Democratic	Deb Butler	44,817	45.84%
Total votes		97,772	100%
Republican hold			

==== District 10 ====
Incumbent Republican Brent Jackson has represented the 10th district since 2011.

North Carolina Senate 10th district general election, 2012
Party	Candidate	Votes	%
Republican	Brent Jackson (incumbent)	48,772	100%
Total votes		48,772	100%
Republican hold			

==== District 11 ====
Incumbent Republican Buck Newton has represented the 11th district since 2011.

North Carolina Senate 11th district general election, 2012
Party	Candidate	Votes	%
Republican	Buck Newton (incumbent)	53,127	60.77%
Democratic	Clarence A. Bender	34,291	39.23%
Total votes		87,418	100%
Republican hold			

==== District 12 ====
The new 12th district is considerably different from its predecessor. Redistricting resulted in it losing its share of Wayne County and most of Johnston County, except for a small section in the western corner where Rouzer's home is located. The new district now includes all of Harnett and Lee counties. Incumbent Republican David Rouzer, who has represented the 12th district since 2009, did not seek re-election. Rouzer instead ran for U.S. House district 7. Republican Ronald Rabin won the open seat.

North Carolina Senate 12th district general election, 2012
Party	Candidate	Votes	%
Republican	Ronald Rabin	37,809	50.99%
Democratic	Brad Salmon	36,337	49.01%
Total votes		74,146	100%
Republican hold			

==== District 13 ====
Incumbent Democrat Michael Walters has represented the 13th district since 2009. The new 13th district lost its share of Hoke County, but now includes Columbus County.

North Carolina Senate 13th district general election, 2012
Party	Candidate	Votes	%
Democratic	Michael Walters (incumbent)	46,974	72.55%
Republican	W. Bernard White Jr.	17,770	27.45%
Total votes		64,744	100%
Democratic hold			

==== District 14 ====
Incumbent Democrat Dan Blue has represented the 14th district since 2009.

North Carolina Senate 14th district general election, 2012
Party	Candidate	Votes	%
Democratic	Dan Blue (incumbent)	72,652	100%
Total votes		72,652	100%
Democratic hold			

==== District 15 ====
Incumbent Republican Neal Hunt has represented the 15th district since 2005.

North Carolina Senate 15th district general election, 2012
Party	Candidate	Votes	%
Republican	Neal Hunt (incumbent)	61,981	55.82%
Democratic	Sig Hutchinson	49,050	44.18%
Total votes		111,031	100%
Republican hold			

==== District 16 ====
Incumbent Democrat Josh Stein has represented the 16th district since 2009.

North Carolina Senate 16th district general election, 2012
Party	Candidate	Votes	%
Democratic	Josh Stein (incumbent)	69,405	100%
Total votes		69,405	100%
Democratic hold			

==== District 17 ====
Incumbent Republican Richard Y. Stevens has represented the 17th district since 2003. Stevens did not seek re-election.

North Carolina Senate 17th district general election, 2012
Party	Candidate	Votes	%
Republican	Tamara P. Barringer (incumbent)	57,101	53.67%
Democratic	Erv Portman	49,298	46.33%
Total votes		106,399	100%
Republican hold			

==== District 18 ====
The new 18th district is essentially a new district, including constituents in eastern Wake County and also includes all of Franklin County. Democrat Doug Berger, who has represented 7th district since 2005, had most of his constituents drawn into the 4th and 20th districts, but he sought re-election here where is home was located. The district was expected to favor Republicans and, as expected, Berger lost re-election to Republican opponent Chad Barefoot.

North Carolina Senate 18th district general election, 2012
Party	Candidate	Votes	%
Republican	Chad Barefoot	51,873	55.92%
Democratic	Doug Berger (incumbent)	40,897	44.08%
Total votes		92,770	100%
Republican gain from Democratic			

==== District 19 ====
Incumbent Republican Wesley Meredith has represented the 19th district since 2011. The new 19th district lost its share of Bladen County and traded Democratic leaning areas with Republican leaning areas to the 21st district in Cumberland County. The gerrymandered district was designed to protect the incumbent Meredith.

North Carolina Senate 19th district general election, 2012
Party	Candidate	Votes	%
Republican	Wesley Meredith (incumbent)	37,308	53.88%
Democratic	George Tatum	31,936	46.12%
Total votes		69,244	100%
Republican hold			

==== District 20 ====
Incumbent Democrat Floyd McKissick Jr. has represented the 20th district since 2007.

North Carolina Senate 20th district general election, 2012
Party	Candidate	Votes	%
Democratic	Floyd McKissick Jr. (incumbent)	75,673	100%
Total votes		75,673	100%
Democratic hold			

==== District 21 ====
Incumbent Democrat Eric Mansfield has represented the 21st district since 2011. The new district was made heavily Democratic by gaining Hoke County and losing Republican leaning areas in Cumberland County to the 19th district. Mansfield did not seek re-election, instead he ran Lieutenant Governor. Democrat Ben Clark won the open seat.

North Carolina Senate 21st district general election, 2012
Party	Candidate	Votes	%
Democratic	Ben Clark	57,805	100%
Total votes		57,805	100%
Democratic hold			

==== District 22 ====
The new 22nd district is a newly created constituency with no incumbent. The new district includes all of Caswell and Person counties as well as parts of Durham County, though most of the city of Durham remains in the heavily Democratic 20th district. Democrat Mike Woodard won the open seat.

North Carolina Senate 22nd district general election, 2012
Party	Candidate	Votes	%
Democratic	Mike Woodard	67,484	65.38%
Republican	Milton Holmes	35,730	34.62%
Total votes		103,214	100%
Democratic win (new seat)			

==== District 23 ====
The new 23rd district loses its share of Person County and gains Chatham County. Incumbent Democrats Eleanor Kinnaird, who has represented the 23rd district and its predecessors since 1997, and Bob Atwater, who has represented the 18th district since 2005, were both redistricted here. Atwater retired and Kinnaird ran for re-election.

North Carolina Senate 23rd district general election, 2012
Party	Candidate	Votes	%
Democratic	Eleanor Kinnaird (incumbent)	71,919	66.97%
Republican	Dave Carter	35,467	33.03%
Total votes		107,386	100%
Democratic hold			

==== District 24 ====
Incumbent Republican Rick Gunn has represented the 24th district since 2011.

North Carolina Senate 24th district general election, 2012
Party	Candidate	Votes	%
Republican	Rick Gunn (incumbent)	51,230	79.02%
Democratic	Brandon Black	13,605	20.98%
Total votes		64,835	100%
Republican hold			

==== District 25 ====
Incumbent Democrat William R. Purcell has represented the 25th district and its predecessors since 1997. Purcell did not seek re-election. Gene McLaurin won the open seat.

North Carolina Senate 25th district general election, 2012
Party	Candidate	Votes	%
Democratic	Gene McLaurin	44,560	53.01%
Republican	Gene McIntyre	39,506	46.99%
Total votes		84,066	100%
Democratic hold			

=== Districts 26–50 ===
==== District 26 ====
Incumbent Republican president pro tempore Phil Berger has represented the 26th district since and its predecessors since 2001.

North Carolina Senate 26th district general election, 2012
Party	Candidate	Votes	%
Republican	Phil Berger (incumbent)	58,276	61.11%
Democratic	Bobby R. Stanley	37,092	38.89%
Total votes		95,368	100%
Republican hold			

==== District 27 ====
The new 27th district is still based in Guilford County but has been drawn to be more Republican than its predecessor. Incumbent Republican Don Vaughan has represented the 27th district since 2009. Vaughan did not seek re-election.

North Carolina Senate 27th district general election, 2012
Party	Candidate	Votes	%
Republican	Trudy Wade	56,865	57.59%
Democratic	Myra Slone	41,870	42.41%
Total votes		98,735	100%
Republican gain from Democratic			

==== District 28 ====
Incumbent Democrat Gladys A. Robinson has represented the 28th district since 2011.

North Carolina Senate 28th district general election, 2012
Party	Candidate	Votes	%
Democratic	Gladys A. Robinson (incumbent)	80,689	100%
Total votes		80,689	100%
Democratic hold			

==== District 29 ====
The new 29th district lost its share of Montgomery County and the eastern half of Randolph County. It gained all of Moore County. Incumbent Republicans Jerry W. Tillman, who has represented the 29th district since 2003, and Harris Blake, who has represented the 22nd district since 2003, were both redistricted here. Blake retired and Tillman was successfully re-elected here.

North Carolina Senate 29th district general election, 2012
Party	Candidate	Votes	%
Republican	Jerry W. Tillman (incumbent)	65,000	100%
Total votes		65,000	100%
Republican hold			

==== District 30 ====
Incumbent Republican Don W. East has represented the 30th district since 2005. East died before the election, so all votes cast for him were given to Shirley B. Randleman, who took the seat at the beginning of the 2013–2014 session.

North Carolina Senate 30th district general election, 2012
Party	Candidate	Votes	%
Republican	Don W. East (incumbent)	49,417	64.32%
Democratic	Ric Marshall	27,416	35.68%
Total votes		76,833	100%
Republican hold			

==== District 31 ====
Incumbent Republican Pete Brunstetter has represented the 31st district since 2006.

North Carolina Senate 31st district general election, 2012
Party	Candidate	Votes	%
Republican	Pete Brunstetter (incumbent)	71,806	68.98%
Democratic	Delmas Parker	32,298	31.02%
Total votes		104,104	100%
Republican hold			

==== District 32 ====
Incumbent Democrat Linda Garrou has represented the 32nd district and its predecessors since 1999. Garrou did not seek re-election. Representative Earline Parmon won the open seat.

North Carolina Senate 32nd district general election, 2012
Party	Candidate	Votes	%
Democratic	Earline Parmon	57,803	72.99%
Republican	Reginald Reid	21,387	27.01%
Total votes		79,190	100%
Democratic hold			

==== District 33 ====
The new 33rd district gained Montgomery County. Incumbent Republican Stan Bingham has represented the 33rd district and its predecessors since 2001.

North Carolina Senate 33rd district general election, 2012
Party	Candidate	Votes	%
Republican	Stan Bingham (incumbent)	61,664	100%
Total votes		61,664	100%
Republican hold			

==== District 34 ====
Incumbent Republican Andrew C. Brock has represented the 34th district since 2003.

North Carolina Senate 34th district general election, 2012
Party	Candidate	Votes	%
Republican	Andrew C. Brock (incumbent)	62,728	100%
Total votes		62,728	100%
Republican hold			

==== District 35 ====
Incumbent Republican Tommy Tucker has represented the 35th district since 2011.

North Carolina Senate 35th district general election, 2012
Party	Candidate	Votes	%
Republican	Tommy Tucker (incumbent)	62,213	100%
Total votes		62,213	100%
Republican hold			

==== District 36 ====
Incumbent Republican Fletcher L. Hartsell Jr. has represented the 36th district and its predecessors since 1991.

North Carolina Senate 36th district general election, 2012
Party	Candidate	Votes	%
Republican	Fletcher L. Hartsell Jr. (incumbent)	60,957	100%
Total votes		60,957	100%
Republican hold			

==== District 37 ====
Incumbent Democrat Dan Clodfelter has represented the 37th district and its predecessors since 1999.

North Carolina Senate 37th district general election, 2012
Party	Candidate	Votes	%
Democratic	Dan Clodfelter (incumbent)	51,376	66.98%
Republican	Michael Alan Vadini	25,325	33.02%
Total votes		76,701	100%
Democratic hold			

==== District 38 ====
Incumbent Democrat Charlie Dannelly has represented the 38th district and its predecessors since 1995. Dannelly initially ran for re-election but later withdrew. Democrat Joel Ford won the open seat.

North Carolina Senate 38th district general election, 2012
Party	Candidate	Votes	%
Democratic	Joel Ford	65,715	80.21%
Republican	Richard Rivette	16,214	19.79%
Total votes		81,929	100%
Democratic hold			

==== District 39 ====
Incumbent Republican Bob Rucho has represented the 39th district and its predecessors since 2008 and previously from 1997 to 2005.

North Carolina Senate 39th district general election, 2012
Party	Candidate	Votes	%
Republican	Bob Rucho (incumbent)	61,006	61.60%
Democratic	Jack Flynn	38,025	38.40%
Total votes		99,031	100%
Republican hold			

==== District 40 ====
Incumbent Democrat Malcolm Graham has represented the 40th district since 2005.

North Carolina Senate 40th district general election, 2012
Party	Candidate	Votes	%
Democratic	Malcolm Graham (incumbent)	63,925	84.11%
Republican	Earl Lyndon Philip	12,075	15.89%
Total votes		76,000	100%
Democratic hold			

==== District 41 ====
The new 41st district is based in Mecklenburg County and includes Republican leaning areas in the Northern and Southeastern sections of the county connected by a narrow strip of land that runs along the county's border with Cabarrus County. The district, which has now incumbent, is expected to favor Republicans. Republican Jeff Tarte won the open seat.

North Carolina Senate 41st district general election, 2012
Party	Candidate	Votes	%
Republican	Jeff Tarte	64,153	100%
Total votes		64,153	100%
Republican win (new seat)			

==== District 42 ====
Incumbent Republican Austin M. Allran has represented the 42nd district and its predecessors since 1986.

North Carolina Senate 42nd district general election, 2012
Party	Candidate	Votes	%
Republican	Austin M. Allran (incumbent)	54,128	64.53%
Democratic	Joseph (Jody) Inglefield	29,757	35.47%
Total votes		83,885	100%
Republican hold			

==== District 43 ====
Incumbent Republican Kathy Harrington has represented the 43rd district since 2011.

North Carolina Senate 43rd district general election, 2012
Party	Candidate	Votes	%
Republican	Kathy Harrington (incumbent)	57,752	100%
Total votes		57,752	100%
Republican hold			

==== District 44 ====
The new 44th district overlaps with much of the former 41st district represented by Republican Chris Carney since December 20, 2011. Carney sought re-election here but was defeated in the Republican primary by David L. Curtis. Curtis won the general election.

North Carolina Senate 44th district general election, 2012
Party	Candidate	Votes	%
Republican	David L. Curtis	60,167	65.85%
Democratic	Ross Bulla	31,197	34.15%
Total votes		91,364	100%
Republican hold			

==== District 45 ====
Incumbent Republican Dan Soucek has represented the 45th district since 2011.

North Carolina Senate 45th district general election, 2012
Party	Candidate	Votes	%
Republican	Dan Soucek (incumbent)	50,848	60.71%
Democratic	Roy J. Carter	32,913	39.29%
Total votes		83,761	100%
Republican hold			

==== District 46 ====
The new 46th district lost its share Caldwell County but gained Cleveland County. Incumbent Republicans Wes Westmoreland, who has represented the 46th district since 2012 and Warren Daniel, who has represented the 44th district since 2011 were both redistricted here. Westmoreland did not seek re-election and Daniel successfully sought re-election here.

North Carolina Senate 46th district general election, 2012
Party	Candidate	Votes	%
Republican	Warren Daniel (incumbent)	43,904	55.96%
Democratic	John T. McDevitt	32,409	41.31%
Libertarian	Richard C. Evey	2,144	2.73%
Total votes		78,457	100%
Republican hold			

==== District 47 ====
The new 48th district lost its share of Haywood and Avery counties but gained all of Polk and Rutherford counties. Incumbent Republican Ralph Hise has represented the 47th district since 2011.

North Carolina Senate 47th district general election, 2012
Party	Candidate	Votes	%
Republican	Ralph Hise (incumbent)	46,415	56.46%
Democratic	Phil Feagan	35,799	43.54%
Total votes		82,214	100%
Republican hold			

==== District 48 ====
The new 48th District lost Polk County but gained Transylvania County. Incumbent Republican Tom Apodaca has represented the 48th district since 2003.

North Carolina Senate 48th district general election, 2012
Party	Candidate	Votes	%
Republican	Tom Apodaca (incumbent)	62,736	100%
Total votes		62,736	100%
Republican hold			

==== District 49 ====
Incumbent Democrat Martin Nesbitt has represented the 49th district since 2004.

North Carolina Senate 49th district general election, 2012
Party	Candidate	Votes	%
Democratic	Martin Nesbitt (incumbent)	61,826	61.96%
Republican	R. L. Clark	37,953	38.04%
Total votes		99,779	100%
Democratic hold			

==== District 50 ====
The new 50th district lost Transylvania County but gained all of Haywood County. Incumbent Republican Jim Davis has represented the 50th district since 2011.

North Carolina Senate 50th district general election, 2012
Party	Candidate	Votes	%
Republican	Jim Davis (incumbent)	50,421	57.11%
Democratic	John J. Snow Jr.	37,873	42.89%
Total votes		88,294	100%
Republican hold			

== See also ==
- List of North Carolina state legislatures
