= Mujtaba A. Mohammed =

American politician

Mujtaba Mohammed
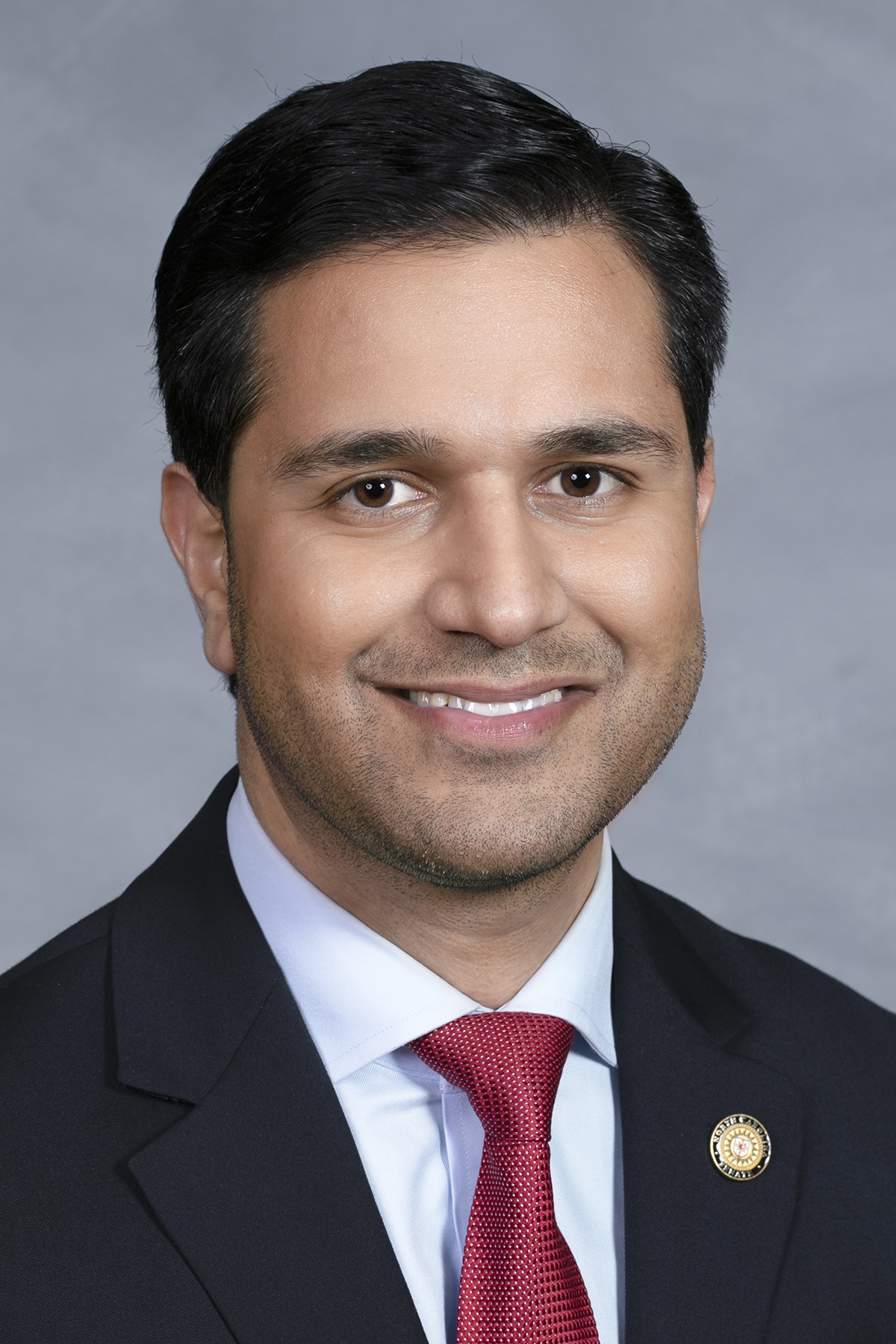
- Official portrait, 2019

Member of the North Carolina Senate from the 38th district
- Incumbent
- Assumed office January 1, 2019
- Preceded by: Joel Ford

Personal details
- Born: June 8, 1985 (age 41) Toledo, Ohio, U.S.
- Party: Democratic
- Education: University of North Carolina, Charlotte (B.A.); North Carolina Central University School of Law (J.D.)
- Occupation: Attorney
- Website: https://mohammednc.com

Mujtaba Aziz Mohammed (Urdu: موجٹابا آزز موہیمڈ) is a Democratic member of the North Carolina General Assembly. On November 6, 2018 he was elected to represent the Mecklenburg County's 38th district in the North Carolina State Senate. He received 81.74% of the votes to secure his victory over the Republican opponent Richard Rivette. He defeated incumbent Joel D. M. Ford in the Democratic primary election on May 8, 2018 by double digits and earned every major endorsement in the race.

== Early life and career ==
Mohammed was born in Toledo, Ohio, and raised in Charlotte, North Carolina. He was born to two immigrant parents from India. Mohammed is a graduate of Charlotte-Mecklenburg Schools, earning his bachelor's degree from the University of North Carolina, Charlotte and Juris Doctor degree from North Carolina Central University School of Law.

His professional experience includes working as a children's rights advocate and public interest attorney. In addition to defending the rights of the underprivileged in the courtroom, and fighting to connect low-income families to the services they need every day, Mohammed serves on the Boards of Directors of non-profit and child advocacy organizations.

=== 2018 Election ===
In 2018 Mohammed challenged a three-term incumbent and won the Democratic primary election. Mohammed campaigned on improving outcomes for North Carolinians. His campaign focused on prioritizing education issues to restore North Carolina's public schools and policies that seek to expand the economy and diversify workforce. In addition, Mohammed's proposals included advocacy for livable wages, restoring tax credits for working families, closing the gender pay gap, increasing affordable access to quality health care, independent redistricting, and criminal justice reforms.

Mohammed was endorsed in his campaign by North Carolina Association of Educators, Charlotte-Mecklenburg Association of Educators, Planned Parenthood, Black Political Caucus of Charlotte-Mecklenburg, North Carolina AFL-CIO, NC League of Conservation Voters, and The Charlotte Observer.

North Carolina Senate
Preceded by Joel Ford	Member of the North Carolina Senate from the 38th district 2019–Present	Incumbent
