= Michael Lazzara =

American politician

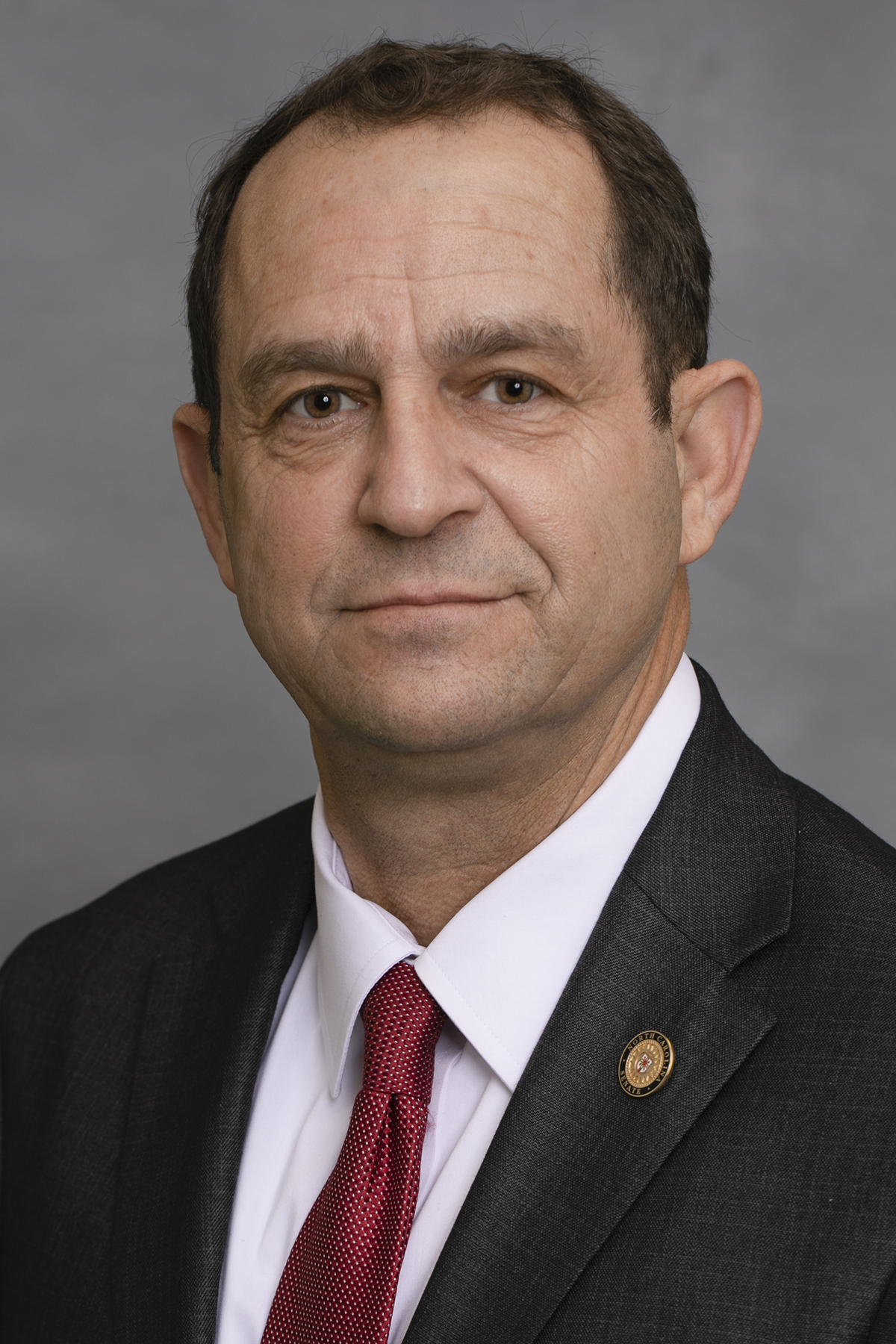

Member of the North Carolina Senate from the 6th district
- Incumbent
- Assumed office January 1, 2021
- Preceded by: Harry Brown

Personal details
- Born: Palermo, Sicily, Italy
- Party: Republican

Michael A. Lazzara is a North Carolina politician.

== Early life and education ==
Lazzara was born in Palermo, Sicily, and raised in Chicago.

== Military career ==
Lazzara served in the United States Marine Corps from 1982-1986 and was stationed at Camp Lejeune. He was promoted to corporal.

== Career ==
Lazzara is the owner of Lazzara Pizza Inc. By 2021, Lazzara has been in the pizza industry for 30 years. In 2005, Lazzara first started serving as Mayor Pro Tem of Jacksonville, North Carolina. On the Jacksonville city council, he represented the 3rd ward. Lazzara is chairman of the Jacksonville Tourism Development Authority. In 2020, Mayor Pro Tem Lazzara, along with Chief Michael Yaniero, accepted a Law Enforcement Agency of the Year awarded to the Jacksonville Police Department by the North Carolina Police Executives Association. On November 3, 2020, Lazzara was elected to the North Carolina Senate seat representing the 6th district. He resigned from the city council as result. Lazarra assumed office on January 1, 2021. Lazarra and was sworn in with a virtual ceremony on January 2 alongside George G. Cleveland and Jimmy Dixon due to the COVID-19 pandemic. Lazzara was appointed to three committees in the state senate: Appropriations on General Government, State and Local Government, Education, and Judiciary. In January 2021, Lazzara advocated for a state senate bill sponsored by Deanna Ballard that sought to reopen North Carolina schools, with a virtual option, amid the pandemic.

== Personal life ==
Lazzara is Catholic.

North Carolina Senate
Preceded by Harry Brown	Member of the North Carolina Senate from the 6th district 2021-present	Incumbent
