= Joyce Waddell =

American politician (born 1944)

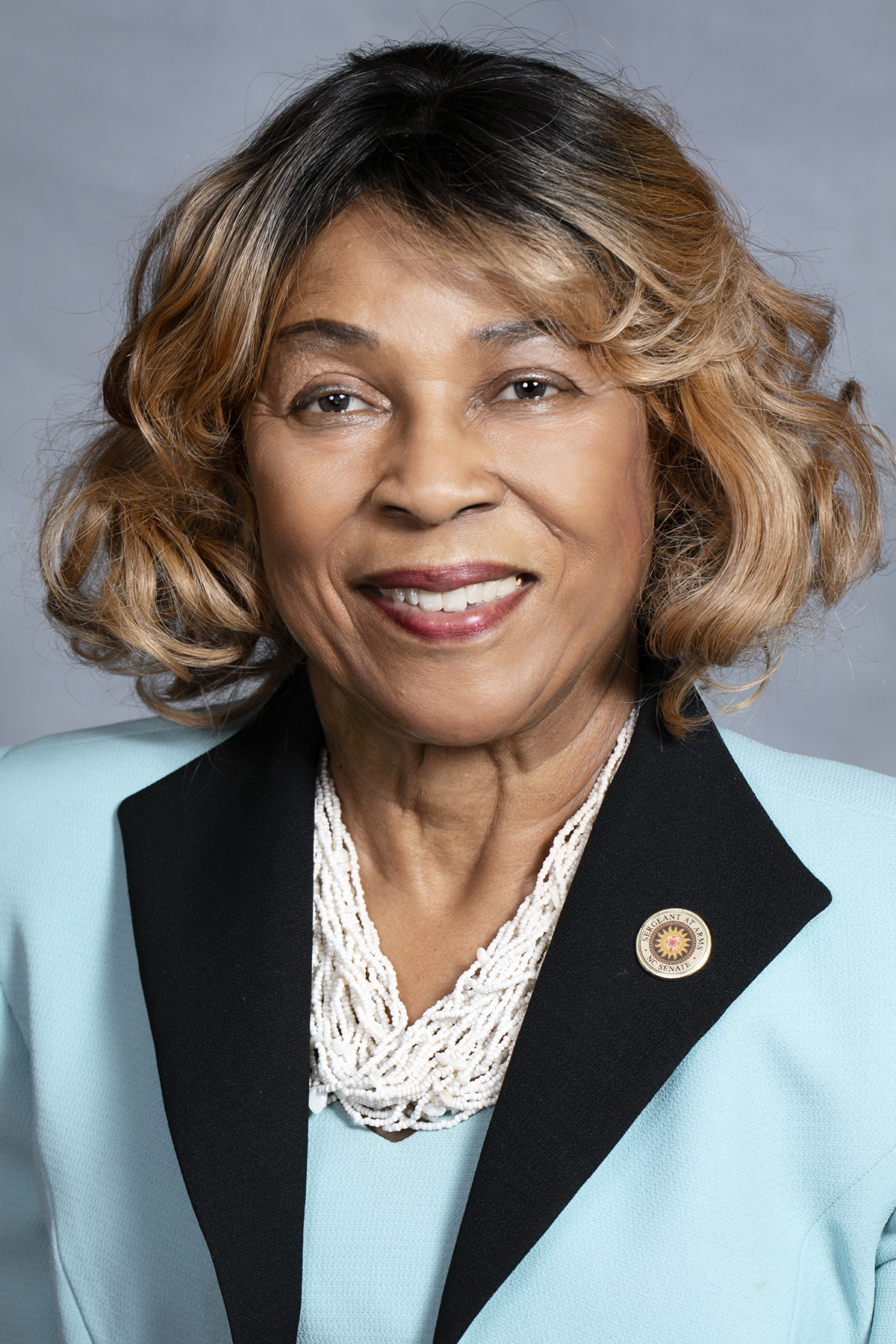

Member of the North Carolina Senate from the 40th district
- Incumbent
- Assumed office January 1, 2015
- Preceded by: Malcolm Graham

Personal details
- Born: July 11, 1944 (age 82)
- Party: Democratic

Joyce Lucille Davis Waddell (born July 11, 1944) is an American politician who has served in the North Carolina Senate from the 40th district since 2015. Waddell is a graduate of South Carolina State University and holds master's degrees from UNC Charlotte, North Carolina A&T State University and Appalachian State University. She earned her Ph.D from the University of North Carolina at Greensboro.

Waddell, a Mullins, SC native is the widow of Dr. E. E. Waddell, a longtime Charlotte-Mecklenburg Schools administrator and superintendent.

North Carolina Senate
Preceded by Malcolm Graham	Member of the North Carolina Senate from the 40th district 2015-Present	Incumbent
