= North Carolina's 50th Senate district =

American legislative district

North Carolina's 50th State Senate district
Senator
Kevin Corbin; R–Franklin
- Demographics: 85% White; 2% Black; 6% Hispanic; 1% Asian; 4% Native American; 2% Multiracial
- Population (2023): 215,113

North Carolina's 50th Senate district is one of 50 districts in the North Carolina Senate. It has been represented by Republican Kevin Corbin since 2021.

== Geography ==
Since 2023, the district has covered all of Cherokee, Clay, Macon, Graham, Swain, Jackson, and Transylvania counties, as well as most of Haywood County. The district overlaps with the 118th, 119th, and 120th state house districts.

== List of members representing the district ==
Senator	Party	Dates	Notes	Counties
District created January 1, 2003.
Bob Carpenter (Murphy)	Republican	January 1, 2003 – January 1, 2005	Redistricted from the 42nd district and re-elected in 2002. Lost re-election.	2003–2013; All of Cherokee, Clay, Macon, Graham, Swain, Jackson, and Transylvania counties. Part of Haywood County.
John Snow (Murphy)	Democratic	January 1, 2005 – January 1, 2011	Elected in 2004. Elected in 2006. Re-elected in 2008. Lost re-election.	2003–2013; All of Cherokee, Clay, Macon, Graham, Swain, Jackson, and Transylvania counties. Part of Haywood County.
Jim Davis (Franklin)	Republican	January 1, 2011 – January 1, 2021	Elected in 2010. Re-elected in 2012. Re-elected in 2014. Re-elected in 2016. Re-elected in 2018. Retired to run for U.S. House of Representatives.	2003–2013; All of Cherokee, Clay, Macon, Graham, Swain, Jackson, and Transylvania counties. Part of Haywood County.
Jim Davis (Franklin)	Republican	January 1, 2011 – January 1, 2021	Elected in 2010. Re-elected in 2012. Re-elected in 2014. Re-elected in 2016. Re-elected in 2018. Retired to run for U.S. House of Representatives.	2013–2023; All of Cherokee, Clay, Macon, Graham, Swain, Jackson, and Haywood counties.
Kevin Corbin (Franklin)	Republican	January 1, 2021 – present	Elected in 2020. Re-elected in 2022. Re-elected in 2024.	2013–2023; All of Cherokee, Clay, Macon, Graham, Swain, Jackson, and Haywood counties.
Kevin Corbin (Franklin)	Republican	January 1, 2021 – present	Elected in 2020. Re-elected in 2022. Re-elected in 2024.	2023–Present; All of Cherokee, Clay, Macon, Graham, Swain, Jackson, and Transylvania counties. Most of Haywood County.

== Election results ==
=== 2024 ===
North Carolina Senate 50th district general election, 2024
Party	Candidate	Votes	%
Republican	Kevin Corbin (incumbent)	83,381	66.53%
Democratic	Adam Tebrugge	41,939	33.47%
Total votes		125,320	100%
Republican hold			

=== 2022 ===
North Carolina Senate 50th district general election, 2022
Party	Candidate	Votes	%
Republican	Kevin Corbin (incumbent)	59,534	66.24%
Democratic	Karen Burnette McCracken	30,347	33.76%
Total votes		89,881	100%
Republican hold			

=== 2020 ===
North Carolina Senate 50th district Republican primary election, 2020
Party	Candidate	Votes	%
Republican	Kevin Corbin	20,077	78.15%
Republican	Sarah Conway	5,613	21.85%
Total votes		25,690	100%

North Carolina Senate 50th district general election, 2020
Party	Candidate	Votes	%
Republican	Kevin Corbin	73,875	66.66%
Democratic	Victoria Fox	36,954	33.34%
Total votes		110,829	100%
Republican hold			

=== 2018 ===
North Carolina Senate 50th district general election, 2018
Party	Candidate	Votes	%
Republican	Jim Davis (incumbent)	48,387	60.30%
Democratic	Bobby Kuppers	31,851	39.70%
Total votes		80,238	100%
Republican hold			

=== 2016 ===
North Carolina Senate 50th district general election, 2016
Party	Candidate	Votes	%
Republican	Jim Davis (incumbent)	59,028	62.46%
Democratic	Jane Hipps	35,476	37.54%
Total votes		94,504	100%
Republican hold			

=== 2014 ===
North Carolina Senate 50th district Democratic primary election, 2014
Party	Candidate	Votes	%
Democratic	Jane Hipps	9,444	69.97%
Democratic	Ron Robinson	4,053	30.03%
Total votes		13,497	100%

North Carolina Senate 50th district general election, 2014
Party	Candidate	Votes	%
Republican	Jim Davis (incumbent)	33,820	53.86%
Democratic	Jane Hipps	28,974	46.14%
Total votes		62,974	100%
Republican hold			

=== 2012 ===
North Carolina Senate 50th district general election, 2012
Party	Candidate	Votes	%
Republican	Jim Davis (incumbent)	50,421	57.11%
Democratic	John Snow	37,873	42.89%
Total votes		88,294	100%
Republican hold			

=== 2010 ===
North Carolina Senate 50th district Republican primary election, 2010
Party	Candidate	Votes	%
Republican	Jim Davis	5,484	60.68%
Republican	Jimmy Goodman	3,554	39.32%
Total votes		9,038	100%

North Carolina Senate 50th district general election, 2010
Party	Candidate	Votes	%
Republican	Jim Davis	31,041	50.13%
Democratic	John Snow (incumbent)	30,880	49.87%
Total votes		61,921	100%
Republican gain from Democratic			

=== 2008 ===
North Carolina Senate 50th district general election, 2008
Party	Candidate	Votes	%
Democratic	John Snow (incumbent)	46,536	57.45%
Republican	Susan C. Pons	34,462	42.55%
Total votes		80,998	100%
Democratic hold			

=== 2006 ===
North Carolina Senate 50th district Republican primary election, 2006
Party	Candidate	Votes	%
Republican	Ken McKim	4,869	43.90%
Republican	Sue Lynn Ledford	4,737	42.71%
Republican	Mark Crawford	849	7.65%
Republican	Rick Bagley	637	5.74%
Total votes		11,092	100%

North Carolina Senate 50th district general election, 2006
Party	Candidate	Votes	%
Democratic	John Snow (incumbent)	37,130	59.93%
Republican	Ken McKim	24,823	40.07%
Total votes		61,953	100%
Democratic hold			

=== 2004 ===
North Carolina Senate 50th district general election, 2004
Party	Candidate	Votes	%
Democratic	John Snow	35,722	49.39%
Republican	Bob Carpenter (incumbent)	35,438	49.00%
Libertarian	Ben Lamm	1,164	1.61%
Total votes		72,324	100%
Democratic gain from Republican			

=== 2002 ===
North Carolina Senate 50th district general election, 2002
Party	Candidate	Votes	%
Republican	Bob Carpenter (incumbent)	30,032	56.46%
Democratic	Dan Robinson (incumbent)	23,164	43.54%
Total votes		53,196	100%
Republican hold			
