= Cathy Dunn =

American politician

Member of the North Carolina Senate from the 33rd district
- In office January 1, 2017 – January 1, 2019
- Preceded by: Stan Bingham
- Succeeded by: Eddie Gallimore (Redistricting)

Personal details
- Born: May 16, 1949 (age 77) Linwood, North Carolina
- Party: Republican

Cathy Dunn (born May 16, 1949) is an American politician who served in the North Carolina Senate from the 33rd district from 2017 to 2019.

== Electoral history ==
North Carolina Senate 33rd district Republican primary election, 2016
Party	Candidate	Votes	%
Republican	Cathy Dunn	9,615	40.14%
Republican	Eddie Gallimore	7,724	32.24%
Republican	Joe D. Kennedy	6,616	27.62%
Total votes		23,955	100%

North Carolina Senate 33rd district general election, 2016
Party	Candidate	Votes	%
Republican	Cathy Dunn	59,367	71.38%
Democratic	Jim Beall Graham	23,809	28.62%
Total votes		83,176	100%
Republican hold			

North Carolina Senate
Preceded by Stan Bingham	Member of the North Carolina Senate from the 33rd district 2017-2019	Succeeded by Carl Ford
