= Jim Davis (North Carolina politician) =

American politician

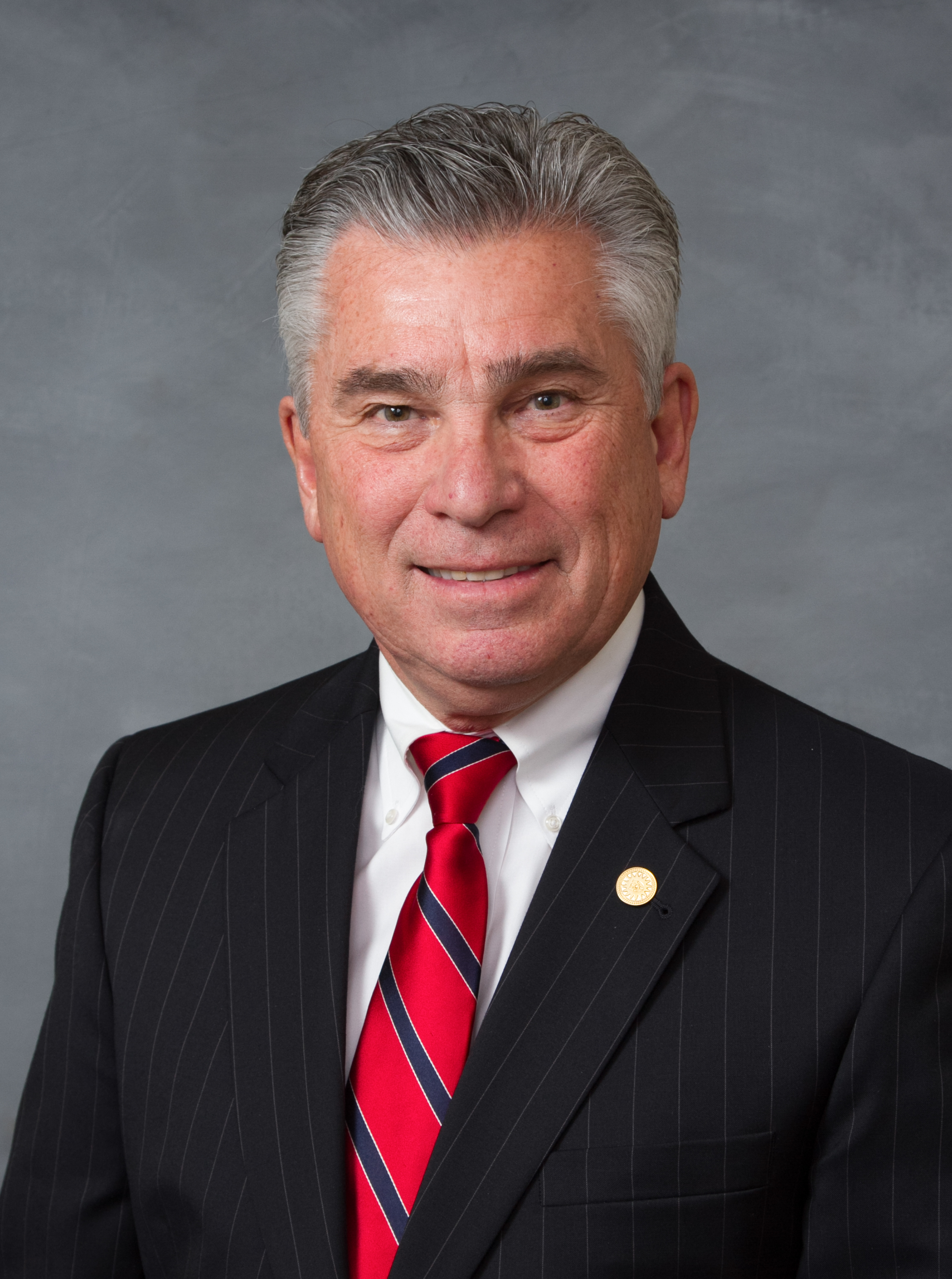

Member of the North Carolina Senate from the 50th district
- In office January 1, 2011 – January 1, 2021
- Preceded by: John Snow
- Succeeded by: Kevin Corbin

Personal details
- Born: James Wayland Davis; January 7, 1947 (age 79) Lynchburg, Virginia, U.S.
- Party: Republican
- Education: Southern Adventist University (BA); Loma Linda University (MS, DDS)
- Profession: Orthodontist, politician

James Wayland Davis (born January 7, 1947) is an American politician and orthodontist who served as a member of the North Carolina General Assembly. He represented the Senate's fiftieth district, which includes Cherokee, Clay, Graham, Haywood, Jackson, Macon, and Swain counties from 2011 until 2021.

== Early life and education ==
Davis was born in Lynchburg, Virginia. He attended Shenandoah Valley Academy, graduating in 1965. Davis earned his bachelor's degree from Southern Missionary College, now Southern Adventist University in 1969. He earned his DDS degree from Loma Linda University's School of Dentistry in 1974. In 1989, he graduated from Loma Linda with his MS in orthodontics.

== Career ==
Prior to operating an orthodontic practice in Franklin, North Carolina, Davis worked as a dentist.

Davis defeated four-term incumbent John J. Snow Jr. in the 2010 and 2012 elections. He defeated Jane Hipps in the 2014 and 2016 elections.

In 2014, Davis's death was falsely reported on Wikipedia in a hoax.

On December 19, 2019, Davis announced that he would be a candidate for Congress in 2020 to succeed incumbent Mark Meadows, who resigned from congress to serve as the 29th White House Chief of Staff. Davis placed third in the June 23, 2020 Republican primary.

North Carolina Senate
Preceded by John Snow	Member of the North Carolina Senate from the 50th district 2011–2021	Succeeded by Kevin Corbin
