= Robert C. Carpenter =

American politician

Member of the North Carolina Senate
- In office January 1, 1989 – January 1, 2005
- Preceded by: Charles William Hipps; Royce Phelps Thomas
- Succeeded by: John J. Snow Jr.
- Constituency: 29th (1989-1993); 42nd (1993-2001); 50th (2003-2005)

Personal details
- Born: June 18, 1924 Franklin, North Carolina, U.S.
- Died: August 6, 2011 (aged 87)
- Party: Republican

Robert C. Carpenter (June 18, 1924 – August 6, 2011) was a Republican member of the North Carolina General Assembly. He represented the state's 29th, 42nd, and 50th Senate districts, including constituents in Cherokee, Clay, Graham, Haywood, Jackson, Macon, Swain and Transylvania counties. A retired bank executive from Franklin, North Carolina, Carpenter was elected to the state senate in 1988. He served eight terms, finally losing his seat in 2004 by fewer than 300 votes.

Carpenter was born in Franklin, North Carolina and graduated from Franklin High School in 1942. He briefly attended Western Carolina University before undergoing flight training at the University of North Carolina at Chapel Hill and flying with the United States Navy during World War II (from 1943 to 1945). After the war, he graduated from the University of Virginia School of Consumer Banking and served as a bank executive in Franklin until his retirement.

Carpenter married twice. His first wife, Ruth, died of cancer on September 15, 1985. Carpenter then married T. Helen Edwards Bryant on January 18, 1986. He had eight children with his first wife. He is the father-in-law of former North Carolina Representative Marge Carpenter (R). He was a member of the Franklin Rotary Club for 50 years. He died in 2011.

After Carpenter's death in 2011, county commissioners unanimously approved a resolution Tuesday, March 18, 2014, to memorialize his life, with the county's community building located on the Georgia Road to be known as the Robert C. Carpenter Community Facilities Building. Carpenter's wife attended the meeting and was herself recognized for her service to the community.

Carpenter worked in politics for much of his life, working on the local level as a county commissioner, and on a national level during eight terms as a North Carolina State Senator. He was a delegate to the Republican National Convention. Locally, he served as President of the Franklin Chamber of Commerce and as Honorary Chairman for the Relay for Life. He worked on behalf of community colleges, serving 20 years on the Southwestern Community College Board of Trustees as well as President of the North Carolina Association of Community Colleges. Carpenter received many awards and recognitions including the State of North Carolina Distinguished Service Award, the NC Knights of Columbus Knight of the Year Award and Macon County Citizen of the Year recognition. He was a recipient of the Order of Long Leaf Pine Award, awarded by the governor of North Carolina. Carpenter spent many hours volunteering his time to baseball; he started Franklin's Little League Baseball, coached Little League Baseball for 30 years, and was the first coach to recruit African Americans to play Little League Baseball in Asheville. For his work with baseball he received the Coach of the Year award and the Franklin Little League award. Carpenter was involved in many local organizations including the Optimist Club, Rotary Club, Jaycees and Knights of Columbus. He was on the Smokey Mountain Mental Health Board and served on the Governor's NC Council on Developmental Disabilities. Carpenter was instrumental in establishing the county's Highway 441 Welcome Center and the Veteran's Clinic in Franklin, and in getting a natural gas line to western North Carolina.

North Carolina Senate
Preceded by Charles William Hipps; Royce Phelps Thomas	Member of the North Carolina Senate from the 29th district 1989–1993; Served alongside: Charles W. Hardin, Clark Plexico	Succeeded by James Clark Plexico
Preceded by District created	Member of the North Carolina Senate from the 42nd district 1993–2003	Succeeded by James Forrester
Preceded by District created	Member of the North Carolina Senate from the 50th district 2003–2005	Succeeded by John Snow
