= Cecil Hargett =

American politician

Cecil Hargett Jr. is a businessman and politician, a former Democratic member of the North Carolina General Assembly, representing the state's sixth Senate district, including constituents in Jones and Onslow counties.

He is a real estate investor from Jacksonville, North Carolina, elected to the state senate for the first time in 2002. He served one term in the 2003-2004 session. He was defeated in the 2004 election by the Republican challenger, Harry Brown, in a year when Democrats gained strength in the Senate and regained control of the State House.

North Carolina Senate
Preceded by R. L. "Bob" Martin	Member of the North Carolina Senate from the 6th district 2003–2005	Succeeded by Harry Brown
