= Joel D. M. Ford =

American politician

Member of the North Carolina Senate from the 38th district
- In office January 1, 2013 – January 1, 2019
- Preceded by: Charlie Dannelly
- Succeeded by: Mujtaba Mohammed

Personal details
- Born: January 16, 1969 (age 57) Charlotte, North Carolina, U.S.
- Party: Democratic

Joel D. M. Ford (born January 16, 1969) is an American politician who served in the North Carolina Senate from the 38th district from 2013 until 2019. In 2021, he became a member of the University of North Carolina Board of Governors.

North Carolina Senate
Preceded by Charlie Dannelly	Member of the North Carolina Senate from the 38th district 2013–2019	Succeeded by Mujtaba Mohammed
