= Harry Brown (American politician) =

American businessman and politician

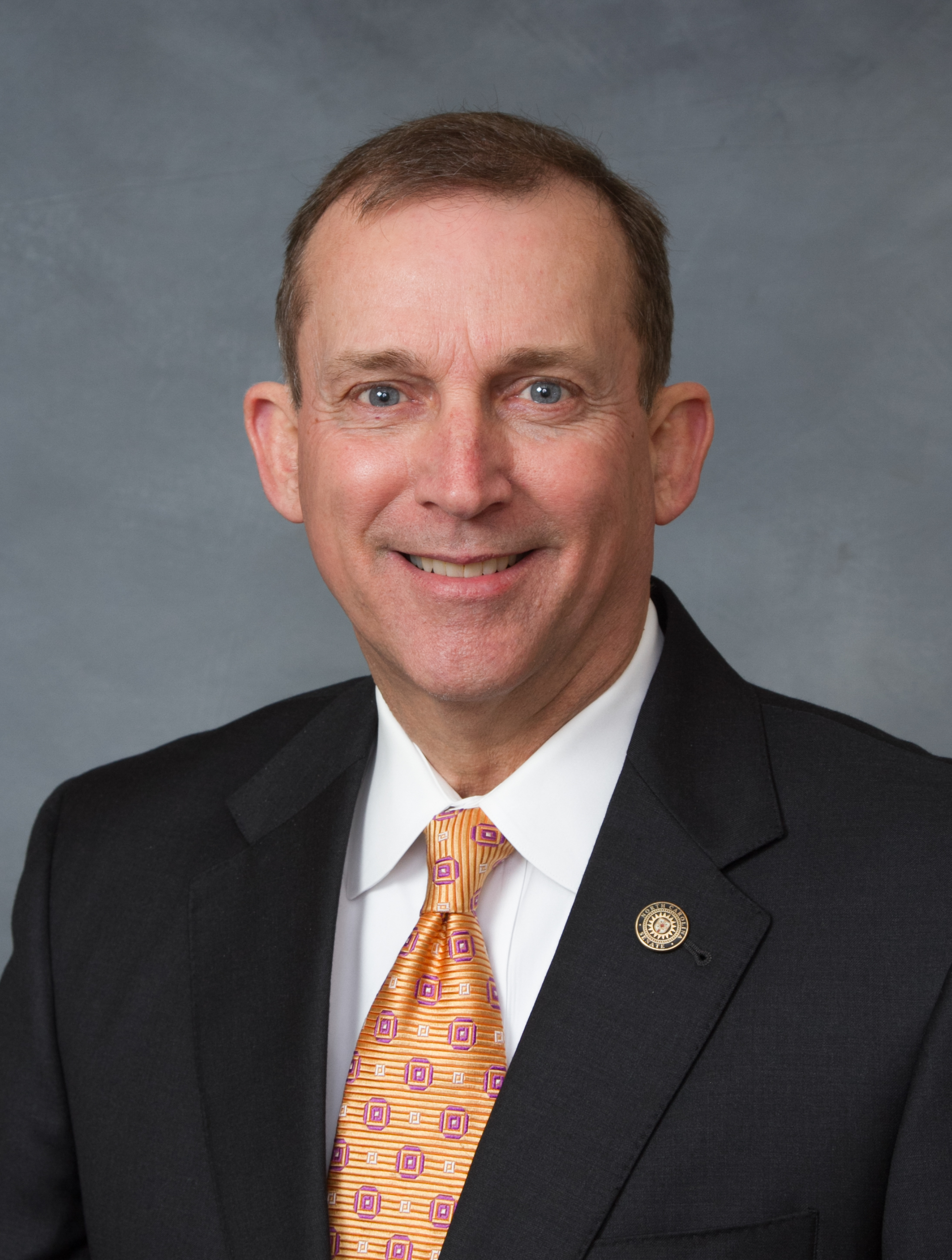

Majority Leader of the North Carolina Senate
- In office January 26, 2011 – January 1, 2021
- Preceded by: Martin Nesbitt
- Succeeded by: Kathy Harrington

Member of the North Carolina Senate from the 6th district
- In office January 1, 2005 – January 1, 2021
- Preceded by: Cecil Hargett
- Succeeded by: Michael Lazzara

Personal details
- Born: April 13, 1955 (age 71) New Bern, North Carolina, U.S.
- Party: Democratic (before 2004); Republican (2004–present)
- Education: Campbell University (BA, MBA)

Harry Brown (born April 13, 1955) is an American businessman and politician. A Republican, Brown has been a member of the North Carolina State Senate since 2004, and the Senate majority leader since 2011. He represents the state's sixth Senate district, which consists of Jones and Onslow counties.

== Early life and education ==
Brown received a BA in business administration and an MBA from Campbell University.

== Business and political career ==
Brown is an automobile dealer, owning a Dodge-Chrysler-Jeep and a Volkswagen-Subaru dealership. Brown later expanded into other businesses, owning an Allstate insurance agency and two Jacksonville, North Carolina radio stations.

Brown first ran for the North Carolina House as a Democrat in 2002, losing by 61 votes in the primary election.

Brown subsequently switched to the Republican Party and in 2004 defeated Democratic incumbent Cecil Hargett. He retained his seat in 2006 by beating Democratic challenger Carolyn Pittman-Dorsey; ran unopposed in the general elections of 2010 and 2014; and in 2018 won re-election with 65% of the vote, defeating Democratic nominee Joseph (Joe) Webb.

Staunchly conservative, Brown opposed the creation of the North Carolina Lottery in 2005, which passed on a close vote. Brown opposes Medicaid expansion for low-income North Carolinians. In 2010, when Republicans took control of the state Senate, Brown was selected by the caucus to become Senate majority leader. As the chamber's chief budget-writer, Brown and state House Speaker Tim Moore, a fellow Republican, were the two North Carolina lawmakers with the most earmarked funding for their districts in the 2015 state budget, securing a collective total of $19 million. Brown defended his use of earmarks for projects in his district, which included $10.96 million for a new middle and high school in Jones County, $2 million for construction of an air traffic control tower at the Albert J. Ellis Airport, and $500,000 for the Museum of the Marine. In 2017 Brown, in an attempt to increase funding in rural communities, proposed legislation to modify the distribution of state spending from sales tax revenue by allocating more of the money to the areas where the customers lived instead of where the businesses they shopped at were located. Urban areas with large shopping centers opposed the move, and the change was not implemented.

In the North Carolina State Senate, Brown was the chief proponent of controversial legislation in 2017 and 2019 to ban, or impose a moratorium on, new wind farms in most of Eastern North Carolina. The wind-power ban proposed by Brown was ultimately dropped from the 2019 legislation as part of a compromise.

North Carolina Senate
Preceded by Martin Nesbitt	Majority Leader of the North Carolina Senate; 2011–2021	Succeeded by Kathy Harrington
