= John J. Snow Jr. =

American politician (1945–2026)

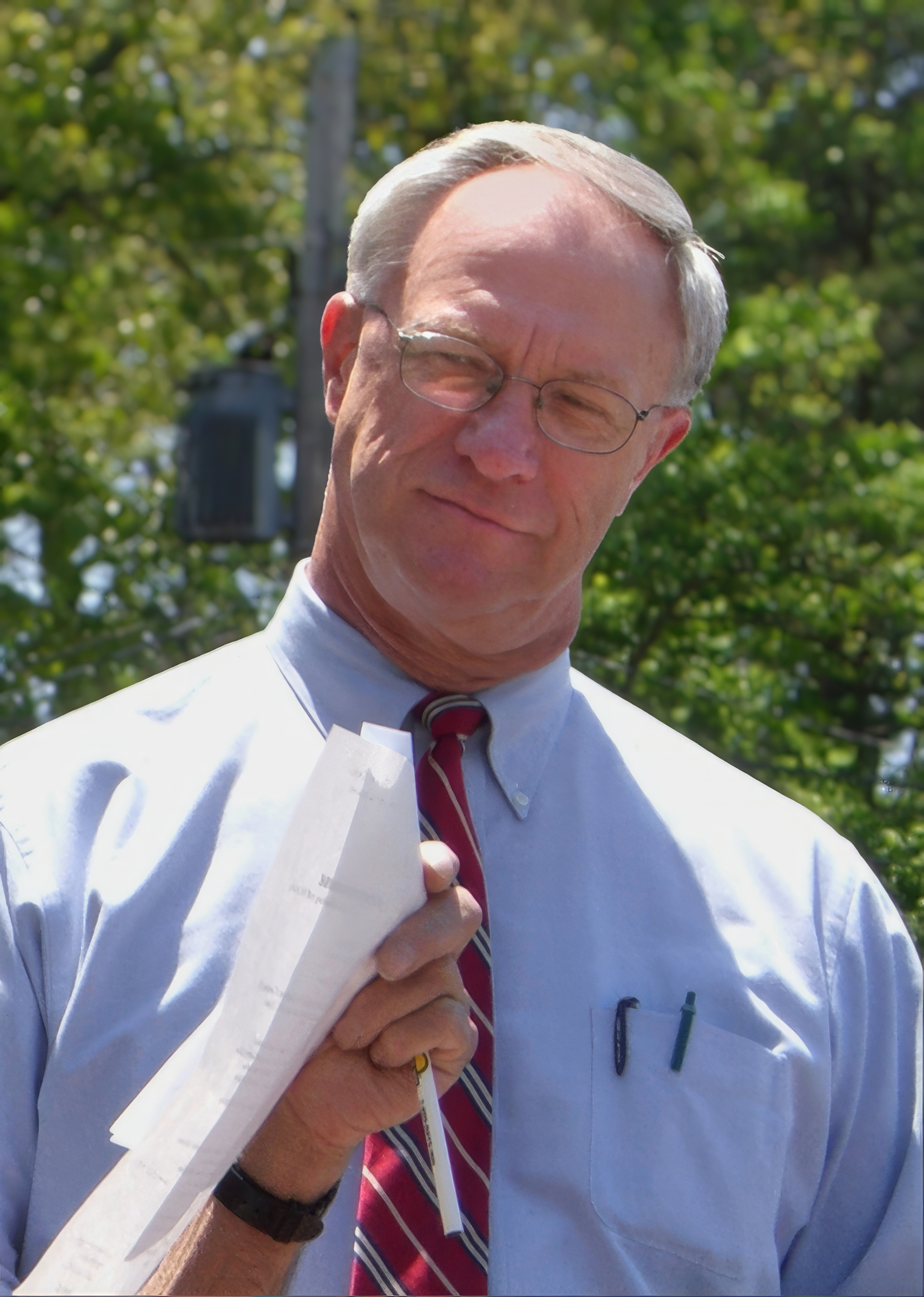

Member of the North Carolina Senate from the 50th district
- In office January 1, 2005 – January 1, 2011
- Preceded by: Bob Carpenter
- Succeeded by: Jim Davis

Personal details
- Born: October 24, 1945 Asheville, North Carolina, U.S.
- Died: June 16, 2026 (aged 80) Murphy, North Carolina, U.S.
- Party: Democratic
- Education: Wake Forest University (BA, JD)

Military service
- Branch/service: United States Army

John Joyner Snow Jr. (October 24, 1945 – June 16, 2026) was an American politician, attorney and football player who served as a member of the North Carolina Senate, for the 50th district from 2005 to 2011. His district included Cherokee, Clay, Graham, Haywood, Jackson, Macon, Swain and Transylvania counties. Snow was the co-chair of the Subcommittee on Justice and Public Safety.

== Early life and education ==
Snow was born in Asheville, North Carolina on October 24, 1945. He grew up in Murphy, North Carolina, and graduated from Murphy High School in 1963. He earned a Bachelor of Arts degree from Wake Forest University and Juris Doctor from the Wake Forest University School of Law in 1970. Snow was a defensive tackle for Wake Forest University, and was drafted 368th overall in the 15th round of the 1967 NFL/AFL draft by the New Orleans Saints.

== Career ==
In 1967, Snow served in the United States Army. After law school Snow worked as an Assistant District Attorney. He later served as a District Court Judge from 1976 to 1986 and Chief District Court Judge from 1996 to 2004. He took office as a member of the North Carolina Senate in 2005.

Franklin orthodontist Jim Davis defeated Snow in 2010 by a margin of less than 200 votes after Snow was subjected to two dozen mass-mailed negative ads during the election. After the election, it was revealed that many of the mail-outs were funded by groups founded by businessman Art Pope, including Civitas Action and Real Jobs NC. In 2012, Snow ran in a re-match with Davis to return to his former seat in the Senate. He was defeated by a substantial margin of 12,548 votes. A bridge on US 64 East in Murphy was named in Snow's honor.

== Personal life and death ==
Snow was a practicing Christian who served in leadership roles at First United Methodist Church in Murphy, North Carolina. Snow died in Murphy on June 16, 2026, at the age of 80, after suffering dementia.

North Carolina Senate
Preceded by Bob Carpenter	Member of the North Carolina Senate from the 50th district 2005-2011	Succeeded by Jim Davis
