= North Carolina's 40th Senate district =

American legislative district

North Carolina's 40th State Senate district
Senator
Joyce Waddell; D–Charlotte
- Demographics: 30% White; 39% Black; 22% Hispanic; 5% Asian; 1% Other; 3% Multiracial
- Population (2023): 223,768

North Carolina's 40th Senate district is one of 50 districts in the North Carolina Senate. It has been represented by Democrat Joyce Waddell since 2015.

== Geography ==
Since 1993, the district has covered part of Mecklenburg County. The district overlaps with the 99th, 100th, 102nd, 104th, and 112th state house districts.

== District officeholders since 1993 ==
Senator	Party	Dates	Notes	Counties
District created January 1, 1993.				1993–Present; Part of Mecklenburg County.
Leslie Winner (Charlotte)	Democratic	January 1, 1993 – January 1, 1999	Retired.	1993–Present; Part of Mecklenburg County.
Dan Clodfelter (Charlotte)	Democratic	January 1, 1999 – January 1, 2003	Redistricted to the 37th district.	1993–Present; Part of Mecklenburg County.
Robert Pittenger (Charlotte)	Republican	January 1, 2003 – January 1, 2005	Redistricted to the 39th district.	1993–Present; Part of Mecklenburg County.
Malcolm Graham (Charlotte)	Democratic	January 1, 2005 – January 1, 2015	Retired to run for Congress.	1993–Present; Part of Mecklenburg County.
Joyce Waddell (Charlotte)	Democratic	January 1, 2015 – Present		1993–Present; Part of Mecklenburg County.

== Election results ==
=== 2024 ===
North Carolina Senate 40th district general election, 2024
Party	Candidate	Votes	%
Democratic	Joyce Waddell (incumbent)	67,654	79.38%
We The People	Jeff Scott	17,569	20.62%
Total votes		85,223	100%
Democratic hold			

=== 2022 ===
North Carolina Senate 40th district general election, 2022
Party	Candidate	Votes	%
Democratic	Joyce Waddell (incumbent)	36,799	67.21%
Republican	Bobbie Shields	17,954	32.79%
Total votes		54,753	100%
Democratic hold			

=== 2020 ===
North Carolina Senate 40th district general election, 2020
Party	Candidate	Votes	%
Democratic	Joyce Waddell (incumbent)	64,278	72.07%
Republican	Bobbie Shields	24,906	27.93%
Total votes		89,184	100%
Democratic hold			

=== 2018 ===
North Carolina Senate 40th district general election, 2018
Party	Candidate	Votes	%
Democratic	Joyce Waddell (incumbent)	44,773	75.63%
Republican	Bobbie Shields	14,426	24.37%
Total votes		59,199	100%
Democratic hold			

=== 2016 ===
North Carolina Senate 40th district general election, 2016
Party	Candidate	Votes	%
Democratic	Joyce Waddell (incumbent)	61,481	82.51%
Republican	Marguerite Cooke	13,032	17.49%
Total votes		74,513	100%
Democratic hold			

=== 2014 ===
North Carolina Senate 40th district Democratic primary election, 2014
Party	Candidate	Votes	%
Democratic	Joyce Waddell	3,244	41.87%
Democratic	Nasif Majeed	2,163	27.92%
Democratic	Matt Newton	1,036	13.37%
Democratic	Morris F. McAdoo	817	10.54%
Democratic	Ty Turner	488	6.30%
Total votes		7,748	100%

North Carolina Senate 40th district general election, 2014
Party	Candidate	Votes	%
Democratic	Joyce Waddell	34,788	100%
Total votes		34,788	100%
Democratic hold			

=== 2012 ===
North Carolina Senate 40th district general election, 2012
Party	Candidate	Votes	%
Democratic	Malcolm Graham (incumbent)	63,925	84.11%
Republican	Earl Lyndon Philip	12,075	15.89%
Total votes		76,000	100%
Democratic hold			

=== 2010 ===
North Carolina Senate 40th district Democratic primary election, 2010
Party	Candidate	Votes	%
Democratic	Malcolm Graham (incumbent)	4,180	75.40%
Democratic	John Montgomery	1,364	24.60%
Total votes		5,544	100%

North Carolina Senate 40th district general election, 2010
Party	Candidate	Votes	%
Democratic	Malcolm Graham (incumbent)	32,168	58.16%
Republican	John Aneralla	23,145	41.84%
Total votes		55,313	100%
Democratic hold			

=== 2008 ===
North Carolina Senate 40th district general election, 2008
Party	Candidate	Votes	%
Democratic	Malcolm Graham (incumbent)	66,307	66.96%
Republican	Ed Mulheren	32,711	33.04%
Total votes		99,018	100%
Democratic hold			

=== 2006 ===
North Carolina Senate 40th district general election, 2006
Party	Candidate	Votes	%
Democratic	Malcolm Graham (incumbent)	21,247	61.48%
Republican	Ed Mulheren	13,314	38.52%
Total votes		34,561	100%
Democratic hold			

=== 2004 ===
North Carolina Senate 40th district Democratic primary election, 2004
Party	Candidate	Votes	%
Democratic	Malcolm Graham	4,767	62.93%
Democratic	T. L. "Fountain" Odom	2,808	37.07%
Total votes		7,575	100%

North Carolina Senate 40th district general election, 2004
Party	Candidate	Votes	%
Democratic	Malcolm Graham	42,096	57.88%
Republican	Brian Sisson	30,633	42.12%
Total votes		72,729	100%
Democratic win (new seat)			

=== 2002 ===
North Carolina Senate 40th district general election, 2002
Party	Candidate	Votes	%
Republican	Robert Pittenger	29,979	54.55%
Democratic	T. L. "Fountain" Odom (incumbent)	23,704	43.13%
Libertarian	Steven Wright	1,272	2.31%
Total votes		54,955	100%
Republican gain from Democratic			

=== 2000 ===
North Carolina Senate 40th district general election, 2000
Party	Candidate	Votes	%
Democratic	Dan Clodfelter (incumbent)	28,118	63.82%
Republican	Wayne Johnson	15,943	36.18%
Total votes		44,061	100%
Democratic hold			
