= North Carolina's 6th Senate district =

American legislative district

North Carolina's 6th State Senate district
Senator
Michael Lazzara; R–Jacksonville
- Demographics: 65% White; 12% Black; 14% Hispanic; 2% Asian; 1% Native American; 7% Multiracial
- Population (2023): 208,537

North Carolina's 6th Senate district is one of 50 districts in the North Carolina Senate. It has been represented by Republican Michael Lazzara since 2021.

== Geography ==
Since 2023, the district has covered all of Onslow County. The district overlaps with the 14th, 15th, and 16th state house districts.

== District officeholders since 1973 ==
=== Multi-member district ===
Senator	Party	Dates	Notes	Senator	Party	Dates	Notes	Counties
Julian Russell Allsbrook (Roanoke Rapids)	Democratic	January 1, 1973 – January 1, 1983	Redistricted from the 4th district. Redistricted to the single-member district.	Vernon White (Winterville)	Democratic	January 1, 1973 – January 1, 1983	Redistricted from the 4th district. Redistricted to the 9th district.	1973–1983; All of Halifax, Edgecombe, Martin, and Pitt counties.

=== Single-member district ===
Senator	Party	Dates	Notes	Counties
Julian Russell Allsbrook (Roanoke Rapids)	Democratic	January 1, 1983 – January 1, 1985	Redistricted from the single-member district.	1983–1985; All of Warren County. Parts of Halifax and Edgecombe counties.
R.L. "Bob" Martin (Bethel)	Democratic	January 1, 1985 – January 1, 2003	Redistricted to the 3rd district and retired.	1983–1993; Parts of Wilson, Edgecombe, Pitt, and Martin counties.
R.L. "Bob" Martin (Bethel)	Democratic	January 1, 1985 – January 1, 2003	Redistricted to the 3rd district and retired.	1993–2003; Parts of Wilson, Edgecombe, Pitt, Martin, and Washington counties.
Cecil Hargett (Richlands)	Democratic	January 1, 2003 – January 1, 2005	Lost re-election.	2003–2023; All of Onslow and Jones counties.
Harry Brown (Jacksonville)	Republican	January 1, 2005 – January 1, 2021	Retired.	2003–2023; All of Onslow and Jones counties.
Michael Lazzara (Jacksonville)	Republican	January 1, 2021 – Present		2003–2023; All of Onslow and Jones counties.
Michael Lazzara (Jacksonville)	Republican	January 1, 2021 – Present		2023–Present; All of Onslow County.

== Election results ==
=== 2024 ===
North Carolina Senate 6th district general election, 2024
Party	Candidate	Votes	%
Republican	Michael Lazzara (incumbent)	53,923	69.63%
Democratic	Andi Morrow	23,519	30.37%
Total votes		77,442	100%
Republican hold			

=== 2022 ===
North Carolina Senate 6th district general election, 2022
Party	Candidate	Votes	%
Republican	Michael Lazzara (incumbent)	33,339	100%
Total votes		33,339	100%
Republican hold			

=== 2020 ===
North Carolina Senate 6th district Republican primary election, 2020
Party	Candidate	Votes	%
Republican	Michael Lazzara	9,291	63.17%
Republican	Bob Williams	5,416	36.83%
Total votes		14,707	100%

North Carolina Senate 6th district general election, 2020
Party	Candidate	Votes	%
Republican	Michael Lazzara	49,007	65.48%
Democratic	Isaiah (Ike) Johnson	25,831	34.52%
Total votes		74,838	100%
Republican hold			

=== 2018 ===
North Carolina Senate 6th district general election, 2018
Party	Candidate	Votes	%
Republican	Harry Brown (incumbent)	27,228	65.07%
Democratic	Joseph (Joe) Webb	14,615	34.93%
Total votes		41,843	100%
Republican hold			

=== 2016 ===
North Carolina Senate 6th district general election, 2016
Party	Candidate	Votes	%
Republican	Harry Brown (incumbent)	45,391	100%
Total votes		45,391	100%
Republican hold			

=== 2014 ===
North Carolina Senate 6th district general election, 2014
Party	Candidate	Votes	%
Republican	Harry Brown (incumbent)	26,604	100%
Total votes		26,604	100%
Republican hold			

=== 2012 ===
North Carolina Senate 6th district general election, 2012
Party	Candidate	Votes	%
Republican	Harry Brown (incumbent)	38,572	100%
Total votes		38,572	100%
Republican hold			

=== 2010 ===
North Carolina Senate 6th district general election, 2010
Party	Candidate	Votes	%
Republican	Harry Brown (incumbent)	21,651	100%
Total votes		21,651	100%
Republican hold			

=== 2008 ===
North Carolina Senate 6th district general election, 2008
Party	Candidate	Votes	%
Republican	Harry Brown (incumbent)	38,139	100%
Total votes		38,139	100%
Republican hold			

=== 2006 ===
North Carolina Senate 6th district general election, 2006
Party	Candidate	Votes	%
Republican	Harry Brown (incumbent)	13,917	64.73%
Democratic	Carolyn Pittman-Dorsey	7,582	35.27%
Total votes		21,499	100%
Republican hold			

=== 2004 ===
North Carolina Senate 6th district Republican primary election, 2004
Party	Candidate	Votes	%
Republican	Harry Brown	2,916	56.74%
Republican	Tommy Pollard Jr.	2,223	43.26%
Total votes		5,139	100%

North Carolina Senate 6th district general election, 2004
Party	Candidate	Votes	%
Republican	Harry Brown	21,624	52.38%
Democratic	Cecil Hargett (incumbent)	18,514	44.84%
Libertarian	Mathew Tillman	1,148	2.78%
Total votes		41,286	100%
Republican gain from Democratic			

=== 2002 ===
North Carolina Senate 6th district Democratic primary election, 2002
Party	Candidate	Votes	%
Democratic	Cecil Hargett	6,329	63.70%
Democratic	Kever M. Clark	3,606	36.30%
Total votes		9,935	100%

North Carolina Senate 6th district Republican primary election, 2002
Party	Candidate	Votes	%
Republican	Tommy Pollard Jr.	2,893	61.61%
Republican	Thomas R. "Tom" Mattison	1,803	38.39%
Total votes		4,696	100%

North Carolina Senate 6th district general election, 2002
Party	Candidate	Votes	%
Democratic	Cecil Hargett	14,146	51.78%
Republican	Tommy Pollard Jr.	13,175	48.22%
Total votes		27,321	100%
Democratic win (new seat)			

=== 2000 ===
North Carolina Senate 6th district Democratic primary election, 2000
Party	Candidate	Votes	%
Democratic	R.L. "Bob" Martin (incumbent)	12,267	84.89%
Democratic	Henry Williams II	2,183	15.11%
Total votes		14,450	100%

North Carolina Senate 6th district general election, 2000
Party	Candidate	Votes	%
Democratic	R.L. "Bob" Martin (incumbent)	34,645	100%
Total votes		34,645	100%
Democratic hold			
