= Malcolm Graham (politician) =

American politician

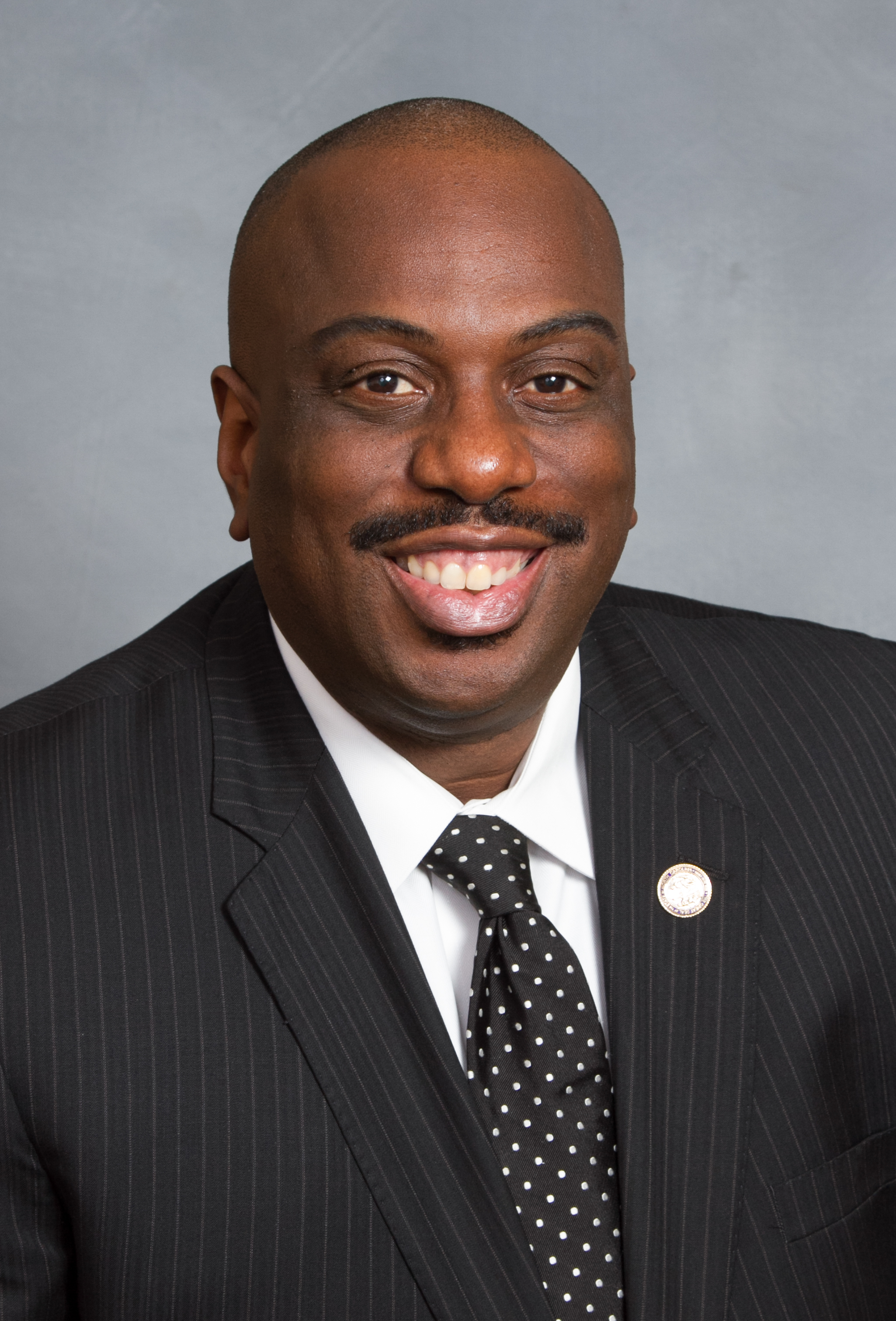

Member of the Charlotte City Council
- Incumbent
- Assumed office December 2, 2019
- Preceded by: Justin Harlow
- Constituency: 2nd district
- In office 1999–2004
- Preceded by: Nasif Majeed
- Succeeded by: Greg Phipps
- Constituency: 4th district

Member of the North Carolina Senate from the 40th district
- In office January 1, 2005 – January 1, 2015
- Preceded by: Constituency established
- Succeeded by: Joyce Waddell

Personal details
- Born: January 14, 1963 (age 63) Charleston, South Carolina, U.S.
- Party: Democratic
- Spouse: Kim
- Education: Johnson C. Smith University (BA)

Malcolm Graham (born January 14, 1963) is a former Democratic member of the North Carolina Senate, where he represented District 40 (Mecklenburg County). He was first elected in 2004, defeating former senator Fountain Odom in the Democratic primary and Republican Brian Sisson in the general election. He served in the Senate until 2014, when he ran unsuccessfully ran for the United States House of Representatives in District 12.

From 1999 until his election to the Senate in 2004, Graham served as a Charlotte City Council Member representing the city's 4th District.

In 2019, Graham ran for the Charlotte City Council again. He won the Democratic primary for the District 2 seat on September 10, and the general election on November 5. He was sworn into office on December 2, 2019.

== Personal life and family ==
Graham was born in Charleston, South Carolina and first came to Charlotte in 1981 to attend Johnson C. Smith University on a tennis scholarship. He is the founder of the Center for Supplier Diversity and has served in leadership roles for Bank of America and Time-Warner Cable. Graham currently serves as Special Assistant to the President for Government and Community Relations at Johnson C. Smith University.

Graham and his wife, Kim, have two daughters, Cortney and Nicole. His sister Cynthia was murdered by white supremacist Dylann Roof in the Charleston church shooting in 2015.
