= Stan Bingham =

American politician (1945–2022)

Stanley Bingham
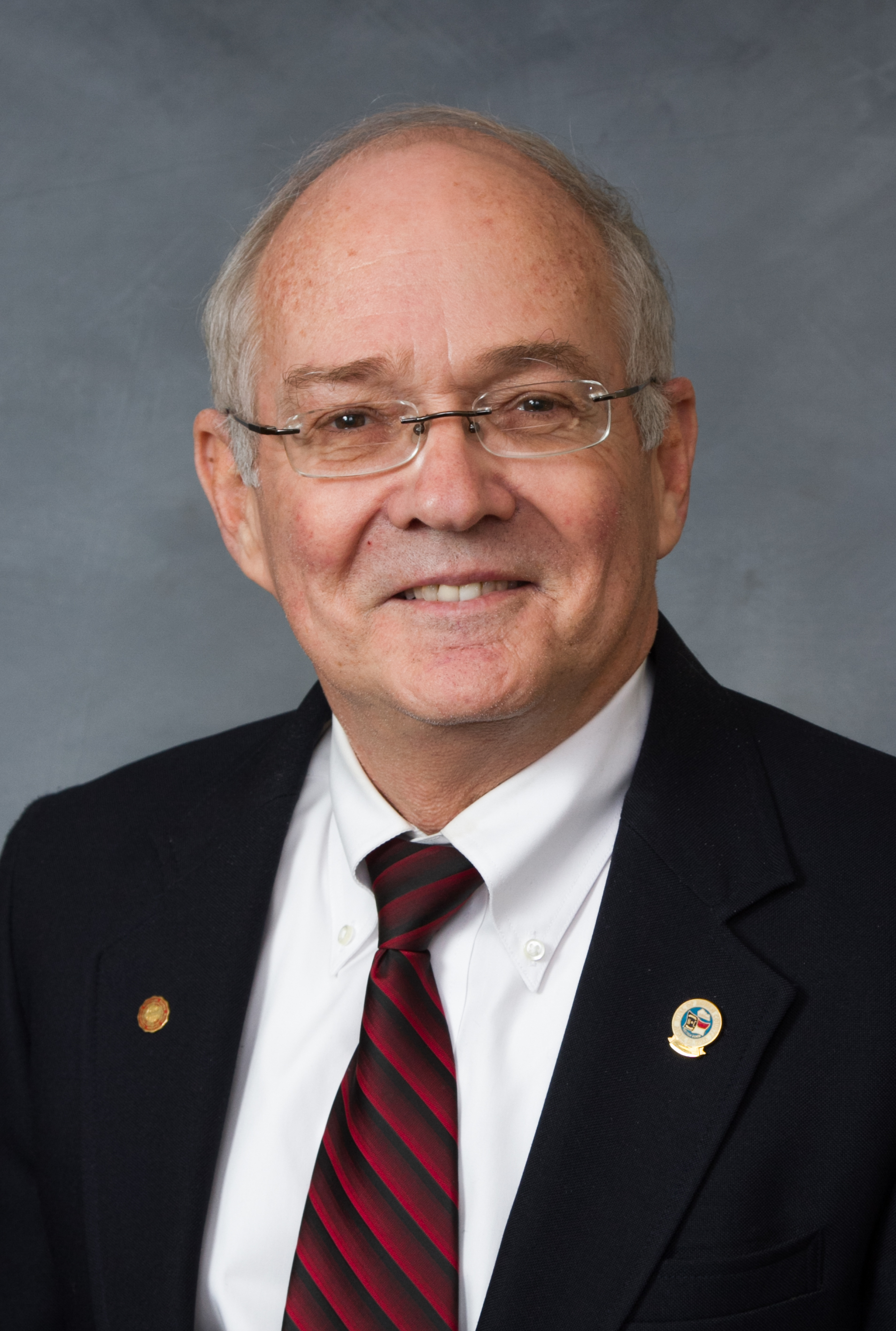

Member of the North Carolina Senate
- In office January 1, 2001 – January 1, 2017
- Preceded by: Betsy Lane Cochrane
- Succeeded by: Cathy Dunn
- Constituency: 38th District (2001-2003); 33rd District (2003-2017)

Personal details
- Born: Stanley Walker Bingham; December 29, 1945 Clemmons, North Carolina, U.S.
- Died: October 27, 2022 (aged 76) Denton, North Carolina, U.S.
- Party: Republican
- Education: North Carolina State University (BS)
- Occupation: Lumber Company Owner, publisher

Stanley Walker Bingham (December 29, 1945 – October 27, 2022) was an American politician, a Republican member of the North Carolina General Assembly representing the state's thirty-third Senate district, including constituents in Davidson and Guilford counties. A small town newspaper publisher and retired lumber company owner from Denton, North Carolina, Bingham formerly served in the state Senate.

Before being elected to the North Carolina General Assembly, Bingham served as chairman of the Davidson County Commissioners. Bingham was married to Lora Bingham; he was first elected to the North Carolina Senate in 2000. He completed 8 terms in 2016 and retired from the Senate in 2017. During his tenure, he introduced and passed 171 bills, many of which were consumer protection related. He supported anti-LGBT legislation.

Bingham died of natural causes at his home in Denton, North Carolina, on October 27, 2022. He was 76.

North Carolina Senate
Preceded by Betsy Lane Cochrane	Member of the North Carolina Senate from the 38th district 2001–2003	Succeeded by Charlie Dannelly
Preceded by Charlie Dannelly	Member of the North Carolina Senate from the 33rd district 2003–2017	Succeeded by Cathy Dunn
