= North Carolina's 38th Senate district =

American legislative district

North Carolina's 38th State Senate district
Senator
Mujtaba Mohammed; D–Charlotte
- Demographics: 31% White; 43% Black; 16% Hispanic; 6% Asian; 3% Multiracial
- Population (2023): 217,749

North Carolina's 38th Senate district is one of 50 districts in the North Carolina Senate. It has been represented by Democrat Mujtaba Mohammed since 2019.

== Geography ==
Since 2003, the district has covered part of Mecklenburg County. The district overlaps with the 98th, 99th, 101st, 106th, and 107th state house districts.

== District officeholders since 1993 ==
Senator	Party	Dates	Notes	Counties
District created January 1, 1993.				1993–2003; All of Davie County. Parts of Forsyth, Davidson, and Rowan counties.
Betsy Lane Cochrane (Mocksville)	Republican	January 1, 1993 – January 1, 2001	Redistricted from the 23rd district. Retired to run for Lieutenant Governor.	1993–2003; All of Davie County. Parts of Forsyth, Davidson, and Rowan counties.
Stan Bingham (Denton)	Republican	January 1, 2001 – January 1, 2003	Redistricted to the 33rd district.	1993–2003; All of Davie County. Parts of Forsyth, Davidson, and Rowan counties.
Charlie Dannelly (Charlotte)	Democratic	January 1, 2003 – January 1, 2013	Redistricted from the 33rd district. Retired.	2003–Present; Part of Mecklenburg County.
Joel Ford (Charlotte)	Democratic	January 1, 2013 – January 1, 2019	Lost re-nomination.	2003–Present; Part of Mecklenburg County.
Mujtaba Mohammed (Charlotte)	Democratic	January 1, 2019 – Present		2003–Present; Part of Mecklenburg County.

== Election results ==
=== 2024 ===
North Carolina Senate 38th district general election, 2024
Party	Candidate	Votes	%
Democratic	Mujtaba Mohammed (incumbent)	94,162	100%
Total votes		94,162	100%
Democratic hold			

=== 2022 ===
North Carolina Senate 38th district general election, 2022
Party	Candidate	Votes	%
Democratic	Mujtaba Mohammed (incumbent)	53,072	100%
Total votes		53,072	100%
Democratic hold			

=== 2020 ===
North Carolina Senate 38th district Democratic primary election, 2020
Party	Candidate	Votes	%
Democratic	Mujtaba Mohammed (incumbent)	18,803	59.36%
Democratic	Laura Anthony	8,537	26.95%
Democratic	Roderick Davis	4,334	13.68%
Total votes		31,674	100%

North Carolina Senate 38th district general election, 2020
Party	Candidate	Votes	%
Democratic	Mujtaba Mohammed (incumbent)	82,871	78.14%
Republican	Jack W. Brosch	23,187	21.86%
Total votes		106,058	100%
Democratic hold			

=== 2018 ===
North Carolina Senate 38th district Democratic primary election, 2018
Party	Candidate	Votes	%
Democratic	Mujtaba Mohammed	6,899	51.93%
Democratic	Joel Ford (incumbent)	5,408	40.71%
Democratic	Roderick Davis	631	4.75%
Democratic	Tim Wallis	346	2.60%
Total votes		13,284	100%

North Carolina Senate 38th district general election, 2018
Party	Candidate	Votes	%
Democratic	Mujtaba Mohammed	53,563	81.73%
Republican	Richard Rivette	11,972	18.27%
Total votes		65,535	100%
Democratic hold			

=== 2016 ===
North Carolina Senate 38th district Democratic primary election, 2018
Party	Candidate	Votes	%
Democratic	Joel Ford (incumbent)	11,619	52.10%
Democratic	Roderick Davis	10,682	47.90%
Total votes		22,301	100%

North Carolina Senate 38th district general election, 2016
Party	Candidate	Votes	%
Democratic	Joel Ford (incumbent)	67,059	79.06%
Republican	Richard Rivette	17,764	20.94%
Total votes		84,823	100%
Democratic hold			

=== 2014 ===
North Carolina Senate 38th district general election, 2014
Party	Candidate	Votes	%
Democratic	Joel Ford (incumbent)	35,366	79.71%
Republican	Richard Rivette	9,003	20.29%
Total votes		44,369	100%
Democratic hold			

=== 2012 ===
North Carolina Senate 38th district Democratic primary election, 2012
Party	Candidate	Votes	%
Democratic	Joel Ford	7,877	52.15%
Democratic	Charlie Dannelly (incumbent) (Withdrawn, but remained on the ballot)	4,569	30.25%
Democratic	Jamison Lawson	2,658	17.60%
Total votes		15,104	100%

North Carolina Senate 38th district Republican primary election, 2012
Party	Candidate	Votes	%
Republican	Richard Rivette	2,283	58.79%
Republican	James Soder	1,600	41.21%
Total votes		3,883	100%

North Carolina Senate 38th district general election, 2012
Party	Candidate	Votes	%
Democratic	Joel Ford	65,715	80.21%
Republican	Richard Rivette	16,214	19.79%
Total votes		81,929	100%
Democratic hold			

=== 2010 ===
North Carolina Senate 38th district general election, 2010
Party	Candidate	Votes	%
Democratic	Charlie Dannelly (incumbent)	33,692	68.67%
Republican	Cedric Scott	15,369	31.33%
Total votes		49,061	100%
Democratic hold			

=== 2008 ===
North Carolina Senate 38th district general election, 2008
Party	Candidate	Votes	%
Democratic	Charlie Dannelly (incumbent)	67,755	73.33%
Republican	James R. Soder	22,056	23.87%
Libertarian	C. Travis Wheat	2,588	2.80%
Total votes		92,399	100%
Democratic hold			

=== 2006 ===
North Carolina Senate 38th district general election, 2006
Party	Candidate	Votes	%
Democratic	Charlie Dannelly (incumbent)	20,372	100%
Total votes		20,372	100%
Democratic hold			

=== 2004 ===
North Carolina Senate 38th district Democratic primary election, 2004
Party	Candidate	Votes	%
Democratic	Charlie Dannelly (incumbent)	4,868	75.67%
Democratic	Lawrence B. Brinson	1,565	24.33%
Total votes		6,433	100%

North Carolina Senate 38th district general election, 2004
Party	Candidate	Votes	%
Democratic	Charlie Dannelly (incumbent)	47,898	100%
Total votes		47,898	100%
Democratic hold			

=== 2002 ===
North Carolina Senate 38th district general election, 2002
Party	Candidate	Votes	%
Democratic	Charlie Dannelly (incumbent)	26,569	100%
Total votes		26,569	100%
Democratic hold			

=== 2000 ===
North Carolina Senate 38th district general election, 2000
Party	Candidate	Votes	%
Republican	Stan Bingham	45,880	88.94%
Libertarian	Michael G. Smith	5,703	11.06%
Total votes		51,583	100%
Republican hold			
