= Charlie Smith Dannelly =

American politician from North Carolina (1924–2026)

Member of the North Carolina Senate
- In office September 2, 1994 – January 1, 2013
- Preceded by: James Franklin Richardson
- Succeeded by: Joel Ford
- Constituency: 33rd District (1995–2003); 38th District (2003–2013)

Member of the Charlotte City Council
- In office 1977–1989

Personal details
- Born: August 13, 1924 Bishopville, South Carolina, U.S.
- Died: February 25, 2026 (aged 101)
- Party: Democratic
- Spouse: Rose
- Education: Johnson C. Smith University; University of North Carolina at Chapel Hill
- Profession: Educator

Charlie Smith Dannelly (August 13, 1924 – February 25, 2026) was an American politician who served as a Democratic member of the North Carolina Senate, who represented the 33rd (and later 38th) district from 1994 to 2013. His district includes constituents in Mecklenburg County. A retired educator from Charlotte, North Carolina, Dannelly served several years as Deputy President Pro Tempore of the Senate.

In 2012, Dannelly, then the longest-serving lawmaker representing Mecklenburg County, filed to run for another term but due to his wife's deteriorating health, he dropped out and endorsed another candidate in the Democratic primary, Joel Ford.

== Life and career ==
Before entering politics in 1977, Dannelly was a teacher and principal. He served during the Korean War as a first lieutenant in the 82nd Airborne Division. Dannelly made 50 parachute jumps and earned the Korean Service Medal with a Bronze Star.

He served on the Charlotte City Council from 1977 until 1989.

Dannelly turned 100 in August 2024, and died on February 25, 2026, at the age of 101.

North Carolina Senate
Preceded by James Franklin Richardson	Member of the North Carolina Senate from the 33rd district 1994–2003	Succeeded by Stan Bingham
Preceded by Stan Bingham	Member of the North Carolina Senate from the 38th district 2003–2013	Succeeded by Joel Ford
