= North Carolina's 33rd Senate district =

American legislative district

North Carolina's 33rd State Senate district
Senator
Carl Ford; R–China Grove
- Demographics: 74% White; 14% Black; 9% Hispanic; 1% Asian; 3% Multiracial
- Population (2023): 212,044

North Carolina's 33rd Senate district is one of 50 districts in the North Carolina Senate. It has been represented by Republican Carl Ford since 2019.

== Geography ==
Since 2019, the district has included all of Rowan and Stanly counties. The district overlaps with the 67th, 76th, 77th, and 83rd state house districts.

== District officeholders ==
Senator	Party	Dates	Notes	Counties
District created January 1, 1985.				1985–2003; Part of Mecklenburg County.
Mel Watt (Charlotte)	Democratic	January 1, 1985 – January 1, 1987		1985–2003; Part of Mecklenburg County.
Jim Richardson (Charlotte)	Democratic	January 1, 1987 – August 15, 1994	Resigned to assume seat on the Mecklenburg County Board of Commissioners.	1985–2003; Part of Mecklenburg County.
Vacant		August 15, 1994 – September 2, 1994		1985–2003; Part of Mecklenburg County.
Charlie Dannelly (Charlotte)	Democratic	September 2, 1994 – January 1, 2003	Appointed to finish Richardson's term. Redistricted to the 38th district.	1985–2003; Part of Mecklenburg County.
Stan Bingham (Denton)	Republican	January 1, 2003 – January 1, 2017	Redistricted from the 38th district. Retired.	2003–2013; All of Davidson County. Part of Guilford County.
Stan Bingham (Denton)	Republican	January 1, 2003 – January 1, 2017	Redistricted from the 38th district. Retired.	2013–2019; All of Davidson and Montgomery counties.
Cathy Dunn (Southmont)	Republican	January 1, 2017 – January 1, 2019	Redistricted to the 29th district and retired.	2013–2019; All of Davidson and Montgomery counties.
Carl Ford (China Grove)	Republican	January 1, 2019 – Present		2019–Present; All of Rowan and Stanly counties.

== Election results ==
=== 2024 ===
North Carolina Senate 33rd district general election, 2024
Party	Candidate	Votes	%
Republican	Carl Ford (incumbent)	77,115	70.99%
Democratic	Tangela (Lucy Horne) Morgan	31,509	29.01%
Total votes		108,624	100%
Republican hold			

=== 2022 ===
North Carolina Senate 33rd district general election, 2022
Party	Candidate	Votes	%
Republican	Carl Ford (incumbent)	52,235	73.27%
Democratic	Tangela (Lucy Horne) Morgan	19,058	26.73%
Total votes		71,293	100%
Republican hold			

=== 2020 ===
North Carolina Senate 33rd district Democratic primary election, 2020
Party	Candidate	Votes	%
Democratic	Tarsha Ellis	7,141	56.70%
Democratic	Geoffrey Hoy	5,453	43.30%
Total votes		12,594	100%

North Carolina Senate 33rd district general election, 2020
Party	Candidate	Votes	%
Republican	Carl Ford (incumbent)	73,453	70.54%
Democratic	Tarsha Ellis	30,679	29.46%
Total votes		104,132	100%
Republican hold			

=== 2018 ===
North Carolina Senate 33rd district Republican primary election, 2018
Party	Candidate	Votes	%
Republican	Carl Ford	8,418	60.04%
Republican	Bill Sorenson	5,602	39.96%
Total votes		14,020	100%

North Carolina Senate 33rd district general election, 2018
Party	Candidate	Votes	%
Republican	Carl Ford	47,473	68.18%
Democratic	Arin Wilhelm	22,154	31.82%
Total votes		69,627	100%
Republican win (new seat)			

=== 2016 ===
North Carolina Senate 33rd district Republican primary election, 2016
Party	Candidate	Votes	%
Republican	Cathy Dunn	9,615	40.14%
Republican	Eddie Gallimore	7,724	32.24%
Republican	Joe D. Kennedy	6,616	27.62%
Total votes		23,955	100%

North Carolina Senate 33rd district general election, 2016
Party	Candidate	Votes	%
Republican	Cathy Dunn	59,367	71.38%
Democratic	Jim Beall Graham	23,809	28.62%
Total votes		83,176	100%
Republican hold			

=== 2014 ===
North Carolina Senate 33rd district Republican primary election, 2014
Party	Candidate	Votes	%
Republican	Stan Bingham (incumbent)	8,210	63.87%
Republican	Eddie Gallimore	4,645	36.13%
Total votes		12,855	100%

North Carolina Senate 33rd district general election, 2014
Party	Candidate	Votes	%
Republican	Stan Bingham (incumbent)	38,784	100%
Total votes		38,784	100%
Republican hold			

=== 2012 ===
North Carolina Senate 33rd district Republican primary election, 2012
Party	Candidate	Votes	%
Republican	Stan Bingham (incumbent)	9,135	40.44%
Republican	Eddie Gallimore	8,630	38.21%
Republican	Sam Watford	4,823	21.35%
Total votes		22,588	100%

North Carolina Senate 33rd district general election, 2012
Party	Candidate	Votes	%
Republican	Stan Bingham (incumbent)	61,664	100%
Total votes		61,664	100%
Republican hold			

=== 2010 ===
North Carolina Senate 33rd district general election, 2010
Party	Candidate	Votes	%
Republican	Stan Bingham (incumbent)	38,859	100%
Total votes		38,859	100%
Republican hold			

=== 2008 ===
North Carolina Senate 33rd district general election, 2008
Party	Candidate	Votes	%
Republican	Stan Bingham (incumbent)	61,387	100%
Total votes		61,387	100%
Republican hold			

=== 2006 ===
North Carolina Senate 33rd district general election, 2006
Party	Candidate	Votes	%
Republican	Stan Bingham (incumbent)	25,469	100%
Total votes		25,469	100%
Republican hold			

=== 2004 ===
North Carolina Senate 33rd district general election, 2004
Party	Candidate	Votes	%
Republican	Stan Bingham (incumbent)	54,801	100%
Total votes		54,801	100%
Republican hold			

=== 2002 ===
North Carolina Senate 33rd district Republican primary election, 2002
Party	Candidate	Votes	%
Republican	Stan Bingham (incumbent)	8,609	71.13%
Republican	Ronald Gilbert Coleman	3,495	28.87%
Total votes		12,104	100%

North Carolina Senate 33rd district general election, 2002
Party	Candidate	Votes	%
Republican	Stan Bingham (incumbent)	39,932	100%
Total votes		39,932	100%
Republican hold			

=== 2000 ===
North Carolina Senate 33rd district general election, 2000
Party	Candidate	Votes	%
Democratic	Charlie Dannelly (incumbent)	30,682	100%
Total votes		30,682	100%
Democratic hold			
