= North Carolina General Assembly of 2015–16 =

152nd North Carolina General Assembly 2015–16
←	2013–14	2017–18	→
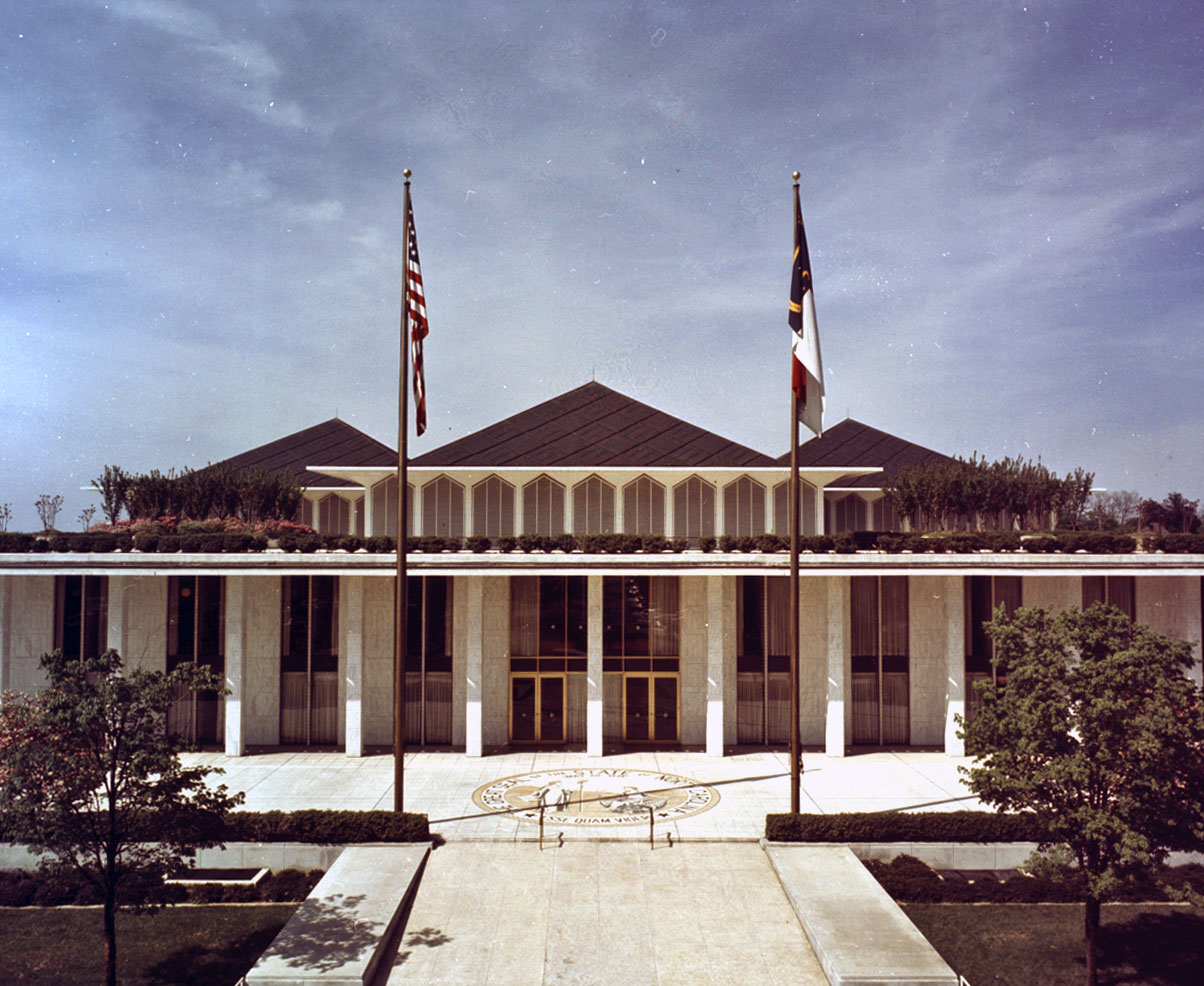
- North Carolina Legislative Building

Overview
- Legislative body: North Carolina General Assembly
- Jurisdiction: North Carolina, United States
- Meeting place: State Legislative Building, Raleigh
- Term: 2015–16
- Website: House, Senate

North Carolina Senate
- Members: 50 senators
- President pro tempore: Phil Berger
- Majority Leader: Harry Brown
- Minority Leader: Dan Blue
- Party control: Republican Party

North Carolina House of Representatives
- Members: 120 representatives
- Speaker: Tim Moore
- Majority Leader: Mike Hager
- Minority Leader: Larry Hall
- Party control: Republican Party

The North Carolina General Assembly of 2015–16 was the state legislature that was first convened in Raleigh, North Carolina on January 14, 2015, and concluded in December 2016. This was the 151st meeting of the North Carolina General Assembly. Members of the North Carolina Senate and the North Carolina House of Representatives were elected on November 4, 2014. Republicans controlled the Senate and Democrats controlled the House of Representatives.

== Legislation ==
The legislature passed 123 session laws during regular sessions. There were four additional sessions dealing with elections and redistricting in which six additional session laws were passed. One particularly controversial session law was Senate Bill 2 (North Carolina General Assembly, 2015 Session) that dealt with an anti-LGBT law and allowed magistrates, assistant registers of deeds, and deputy registers of deeds to recuse themselves from performing duties related to marriage ceremonies due to sincerely held religious objection.

Pat McCrory was the Governor of North Carolina and Dan Forest was Lieutenant Governor of North Carolina and President of the Senate during these sessions of the general assembly. Both were Republicans.

== House of Representatives ==
=== House leadership ===
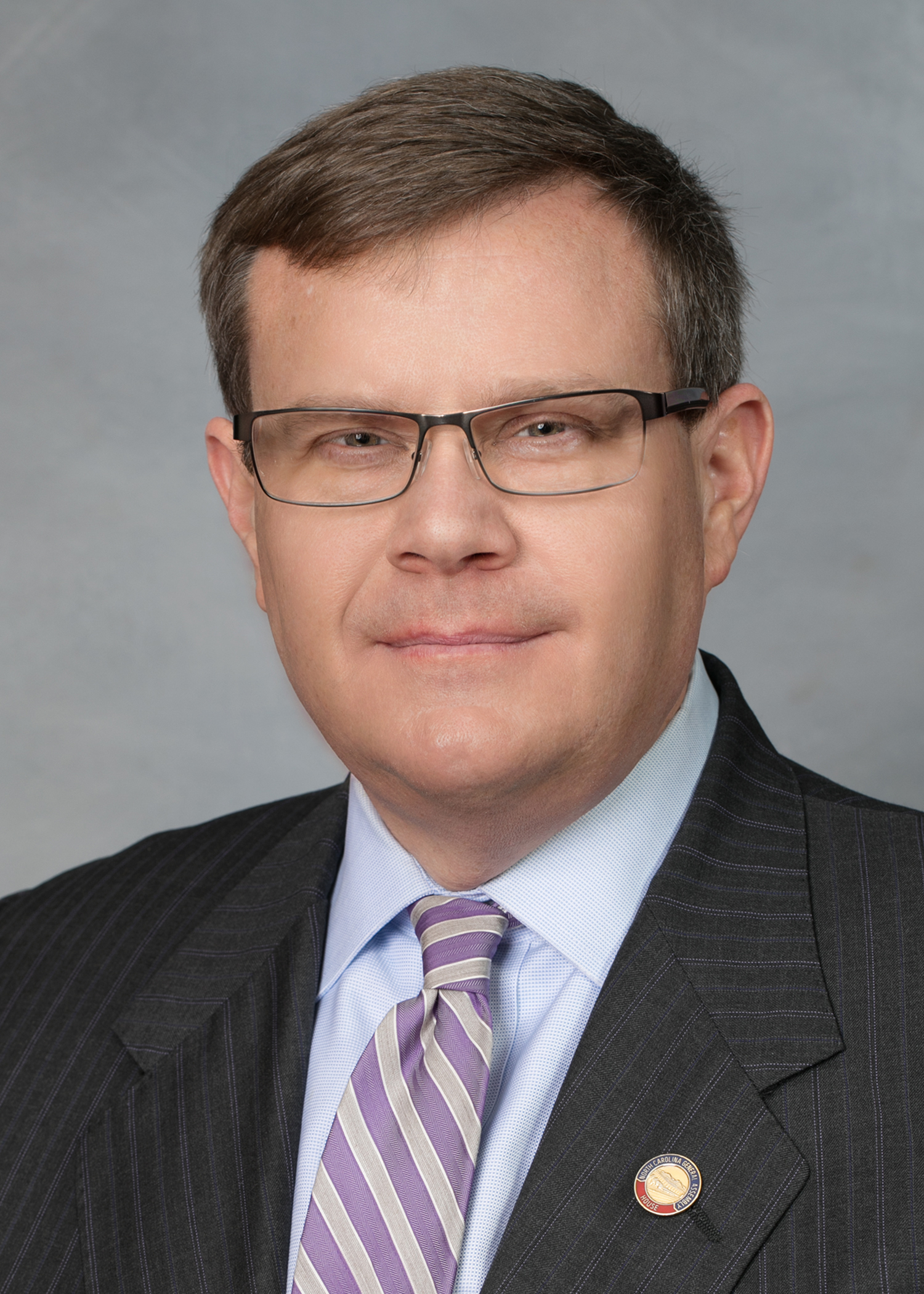
Speaker Tim Moore

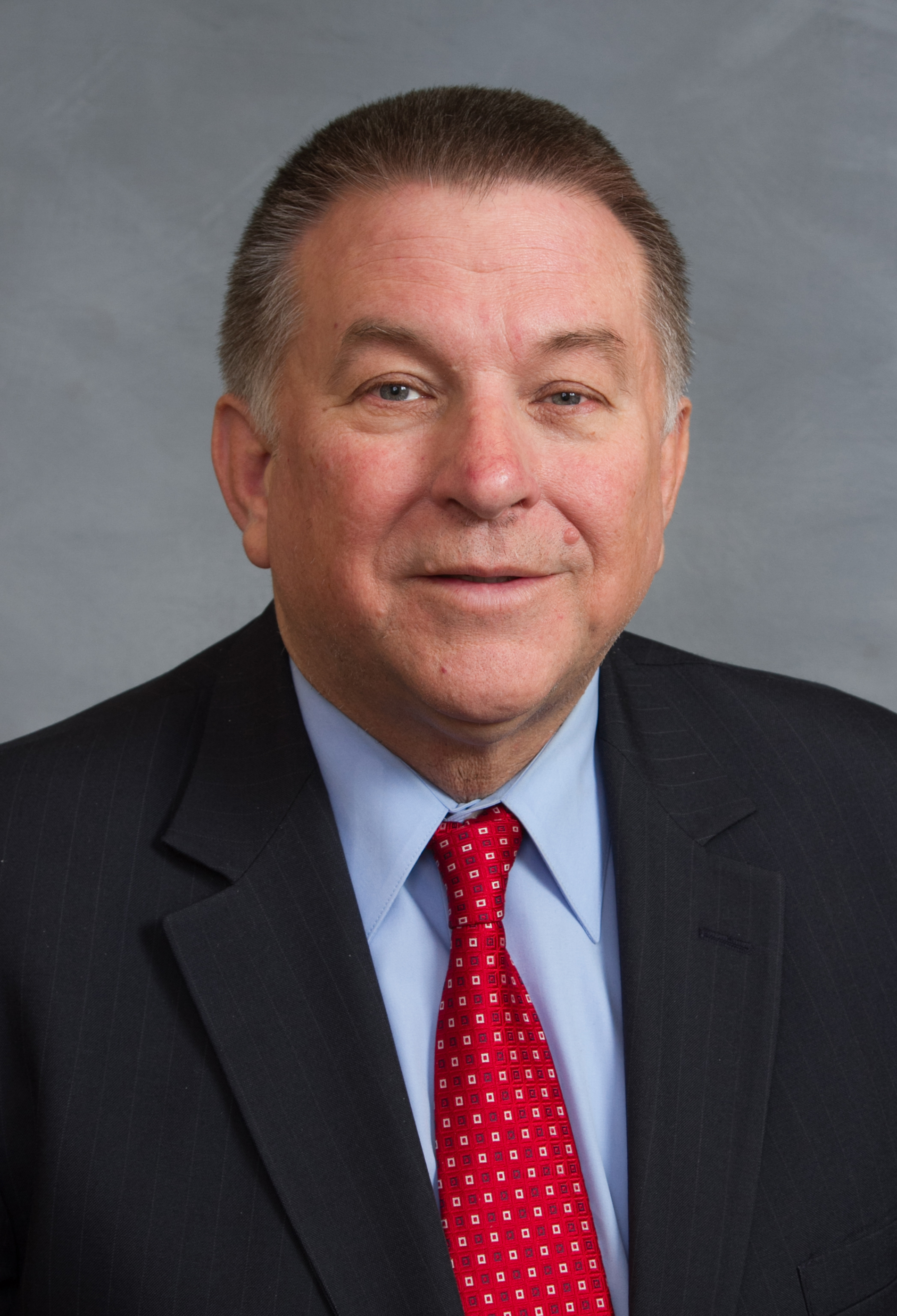
Speaker Pro Tempore Paul Stam

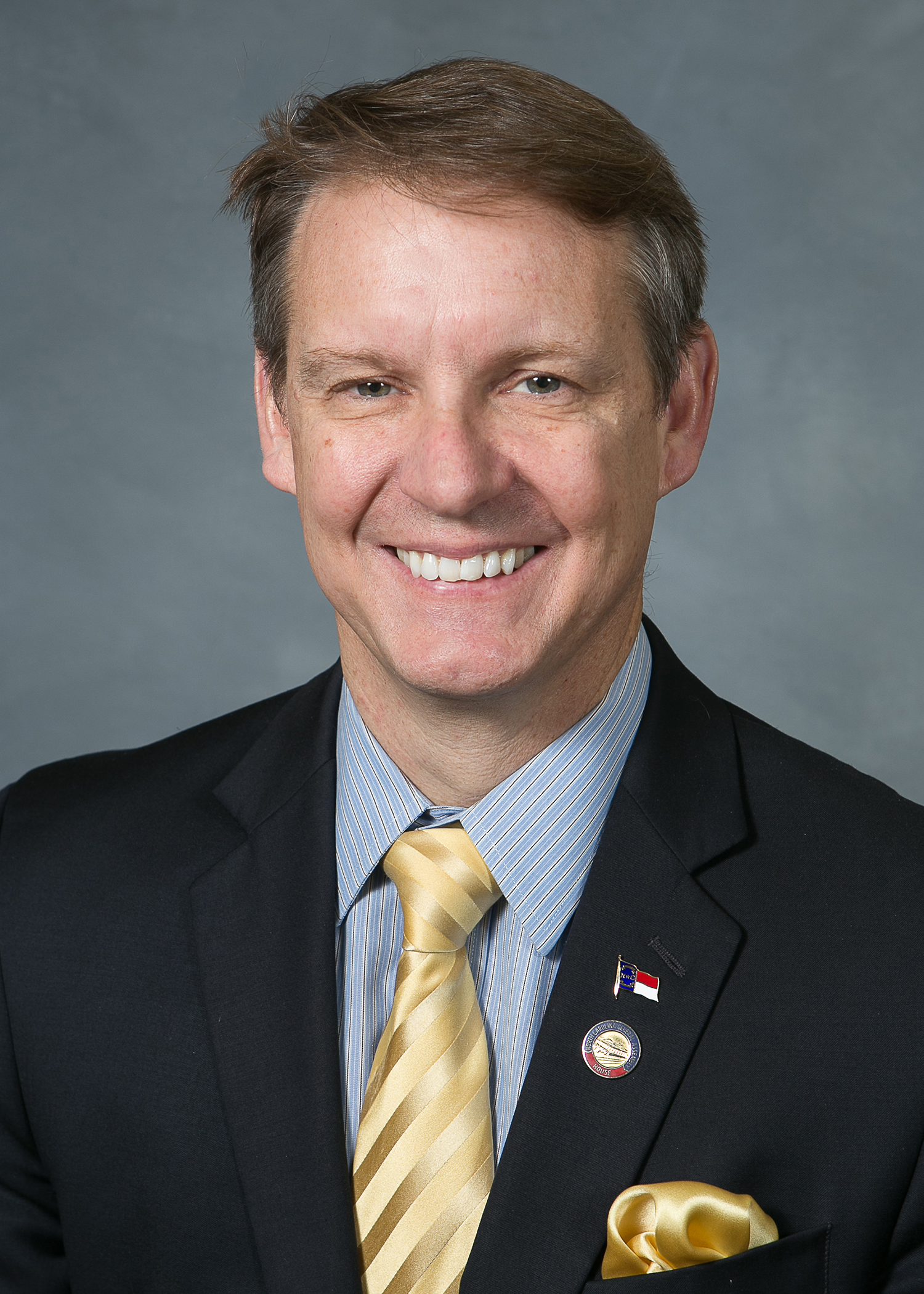
Majority Leader Michael Hager

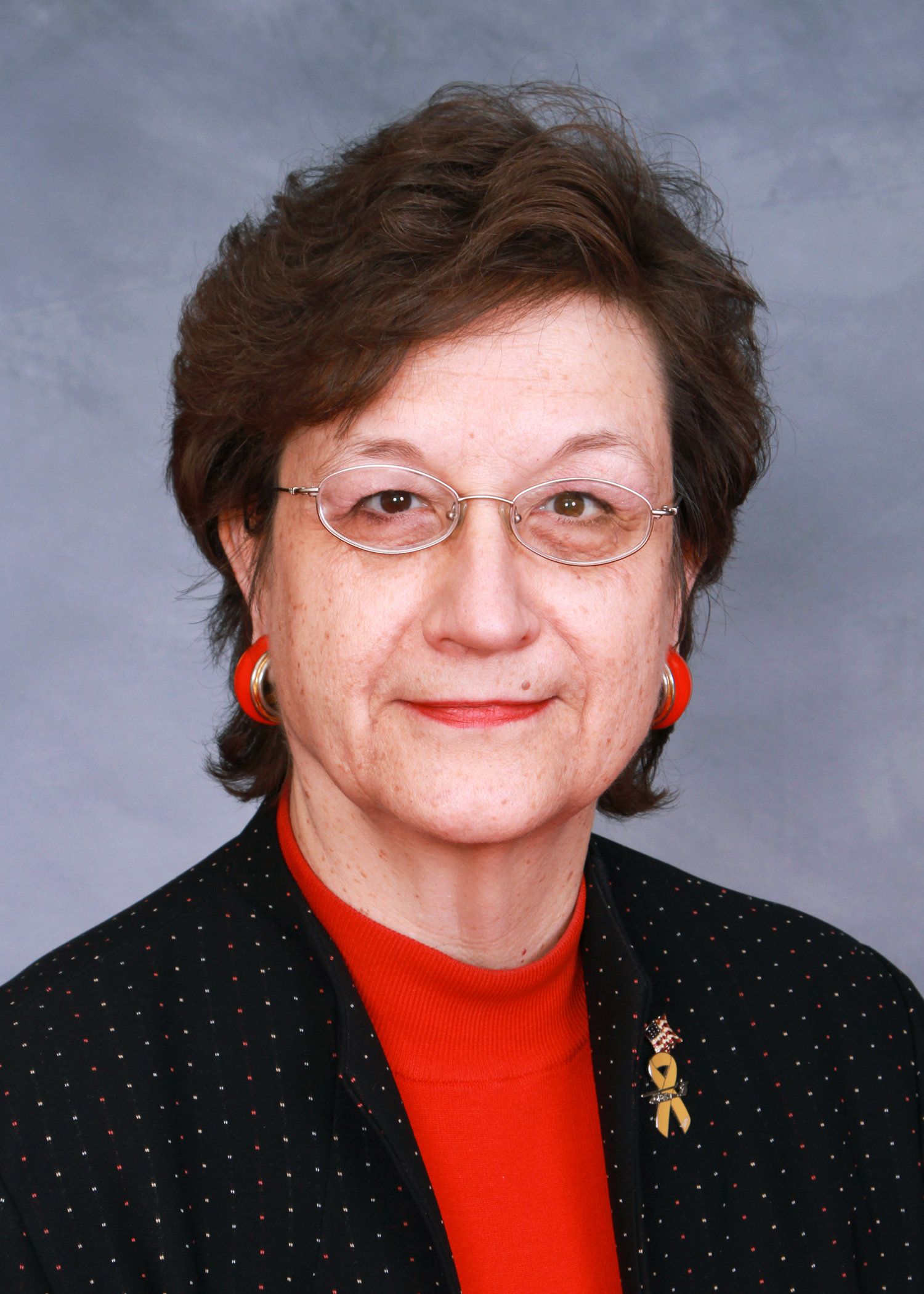
Deputy Majority Leader Marilyn Avila

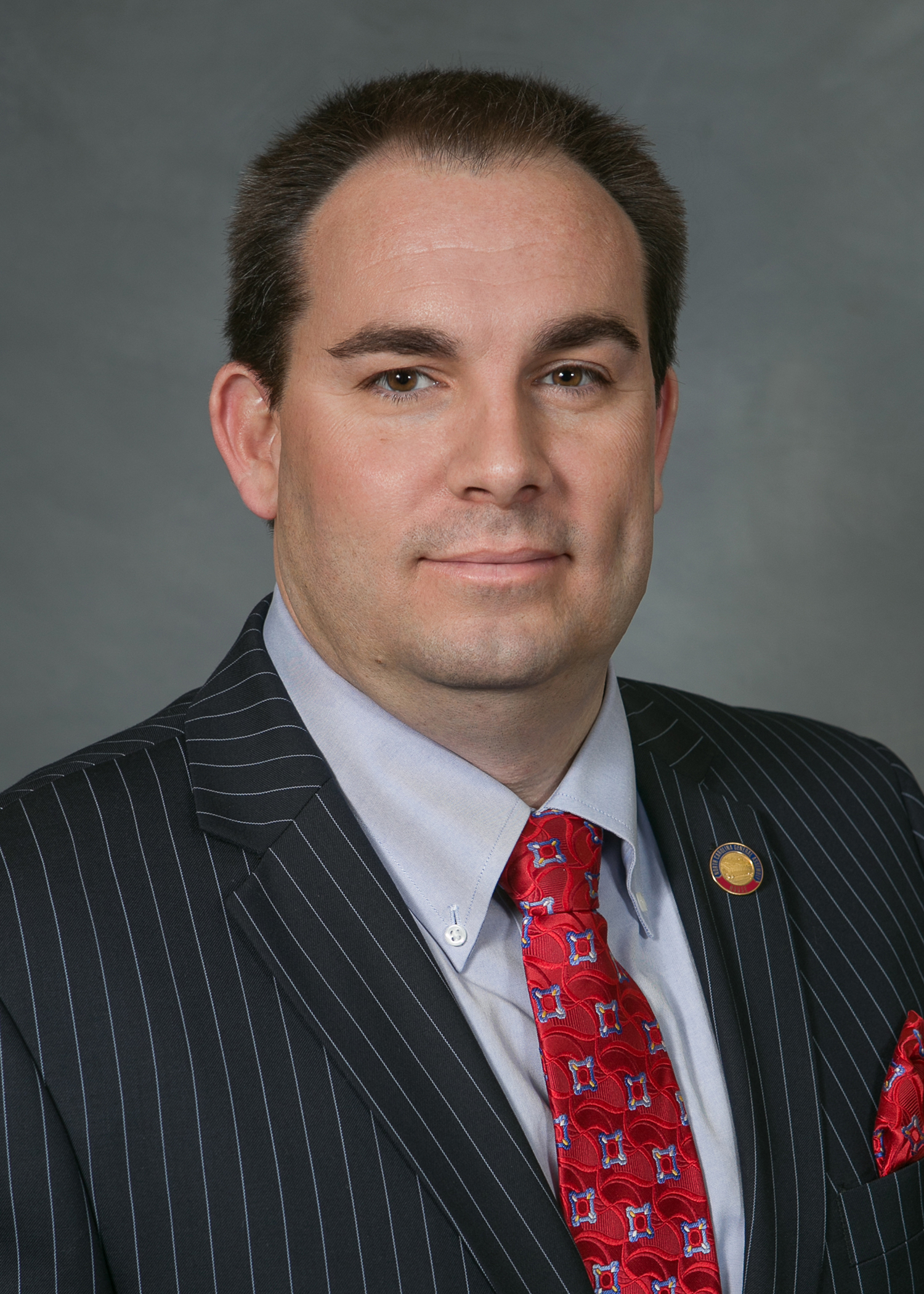
Majority Whip J. R. Bell, IV

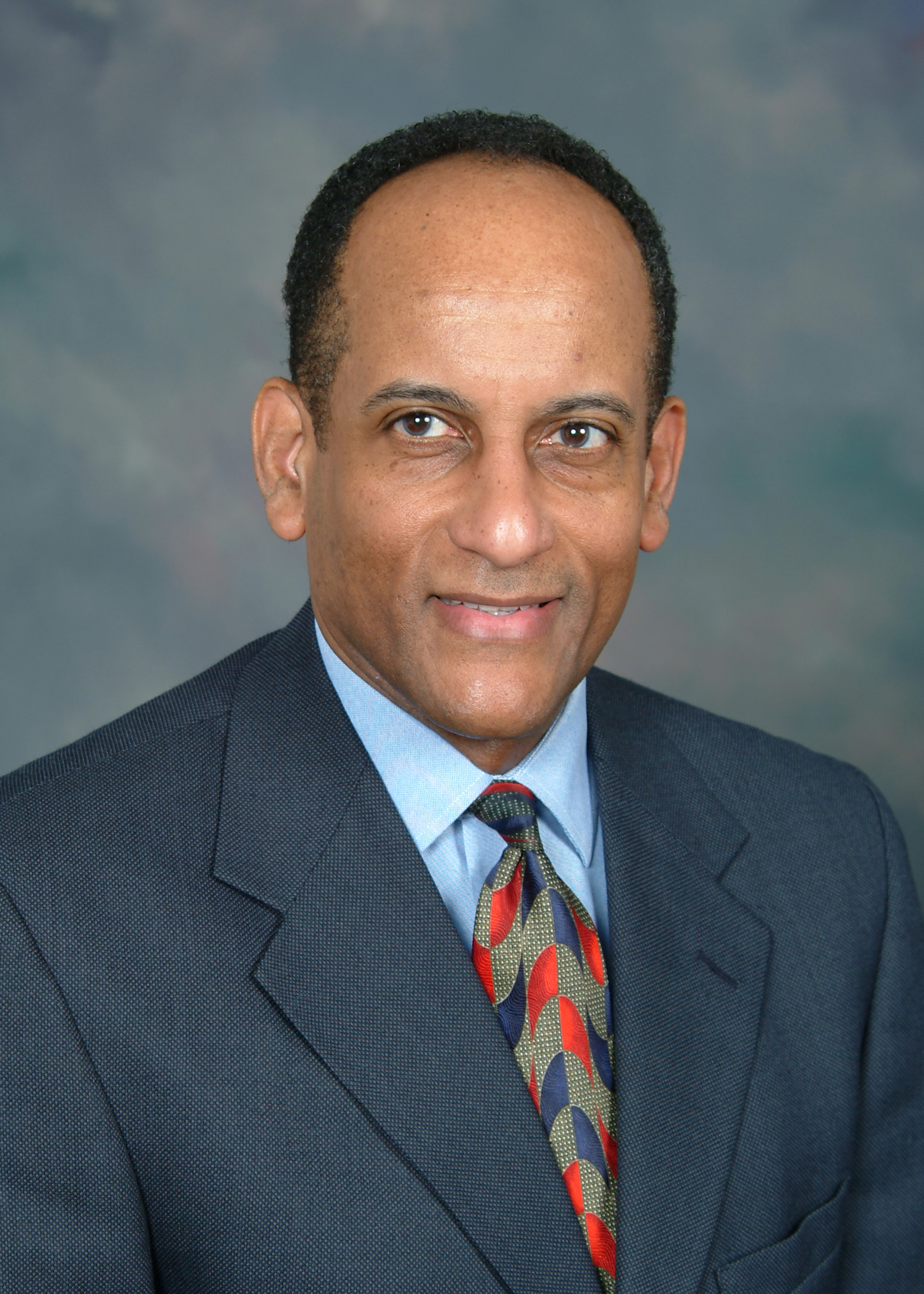
Minority Leader Larry Hall

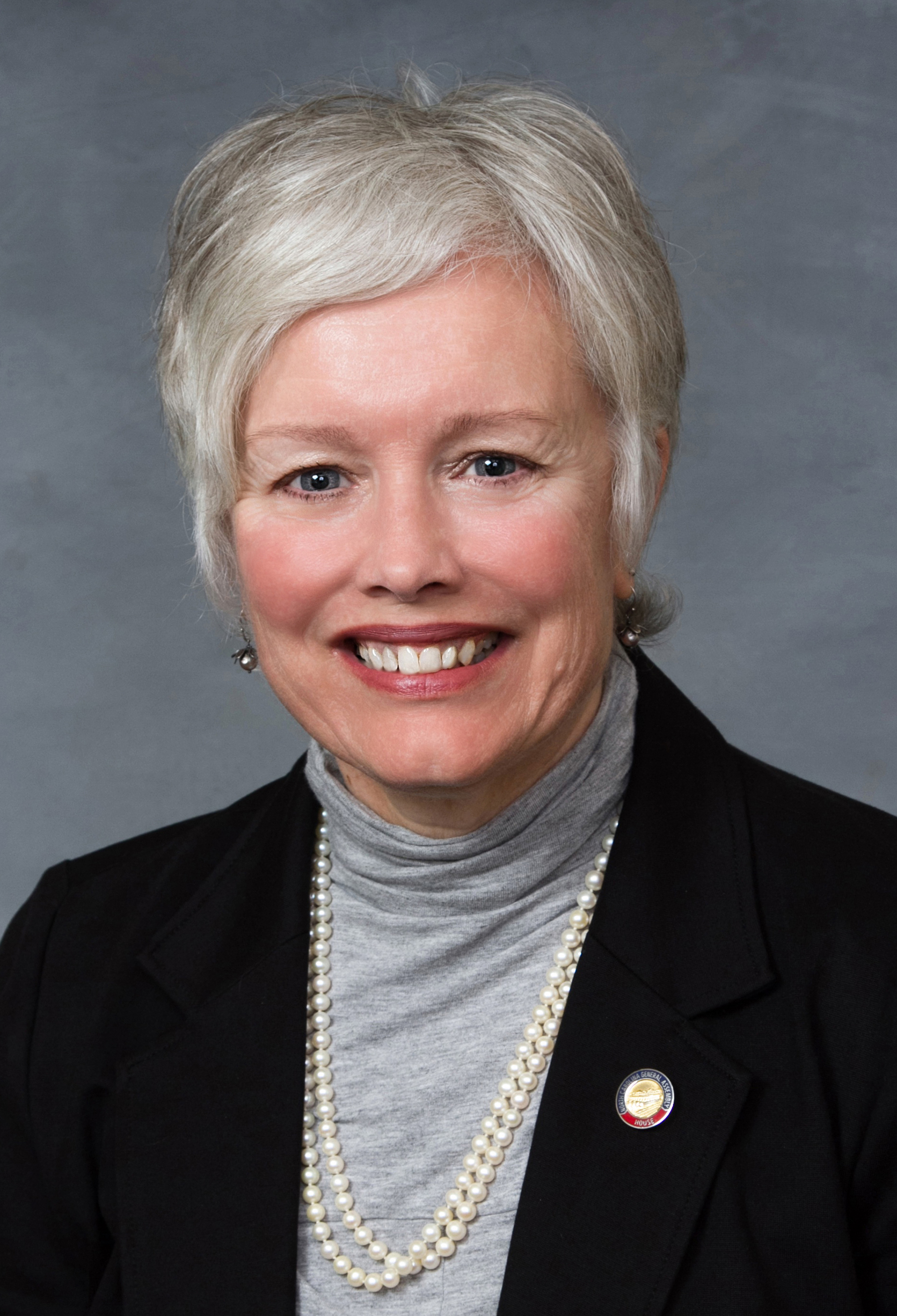
Deputy Minority Leader Susan C. Fisher

House of Representatives officers
Position	Name	Party
Speaker Pro Tempore	Paul Stam	Republican
Majority Leader	Mike Hager	Republican
Deputy Majority Leader	Marilyn Avila	Republican
Majority Whip	John R. Bell IV	Republican
Deputy Majority Whips	Dean Arp	Republican
Deputy Majority Whips	James L. Boles Jr.	Republican
Conference Chair	Charles Jeter	Republican
Joint Caucus Leader	Pat B. Hurley	Republican
Majority Freshman Leader	John A. Fraley	Republican
Majority Freshman Whip	John R. Bradford III	Republican
Deputy Minority Leader	Susan C. Fisher	Democratic
Secretary	Bobbie Richardson	Democratic
Executive Liaisons	Mickey Michaux	Democratic
Executive Liaisons	Michael H. Wray	Democratic
Democratic Conference Chairs	Grier Martin	Democratic
Democratic Conference Chairs	Garland E. Pierce	Democratic
Freshman Caucus Co-Chairs	Graig R. Meyer	Democratic
Freshman Caucus Co-Chairs	Robert T. Reives II	Democratic

=== Members of the House ===
The House of Representatives consisted of members representing the 120 districts established from population numbers in the 2010 census. The house members included 26 women, 22 African Americans, and one Native American. There were 74 Republicans, 45 Democrats and one Independent Representatives from the 120 districts in North Carolina.

The following table lists the districts and representatives:

District	Representative	Party	Residence	Counties represented
1st	Bob Steinburg	Republican	Edenton	Tyrrell, Currituck, Camden, Pasquotank (part), Perquimans, and Chowan
2nd	Larry Yarborough	Republican	Roxboro	Person and Granville (part)
3rd	Michael Speciale	Republican	New Bern	Pamlico, Beaufort (part), and Craven (part)
4th	Jimmy Dixon	Republican	Warsaw	Duplin (part) and Wayne (part)
5th	Howard Hunter III	Democratic	Ahoskie	Bertie, Hertford, Gates, and Pasquotank (part)
6th	Paul Tine	Independent	Kitty Hawk	Dare, Hyde, Washington, and Beaufort (part)
7th	Bobbie Richardson	Democratic	Louisburg	Nash (part) and Franklin (part)
8th	Susan Martin	Republican	Wilson	Wilson (part) and Pitt (part)
9th	Brian Brown (Note: Resigned October 6, 2015.)	Republican	Greenville	Pitt (part)
9th	Greg Murphy (Note: Appointed October 19, 2015.)	Republican	Greenville	Pitt (part)
10th	John Bell	Republican	Goldsboro	Wayne (part), Greene (part), Lenoir (part), and Craven (part)
11th	Duane Hall	Democratic	Raleigh	Wake (part)
12th	George Graham	Democratic	Kinston	Greene (part), Lenoir (part), and Craven (part)
13th	Pat McElraft	Republican	Emerald Isle	Carteret and Jones
14th	George Cleveland	Republican	Jacksonville	Onslow (part)
15th	Phil Shepard	Republican	Jacksonville	Onslow (part)
16th	Chris Millis	Republican	Hampstead	Pender and Onslow (part)
17th	Frank Iler	Republican	Oak Island	Brunswick (part)
18th	Susi Hamilton	Democratic	Wilmington	Brunswick (part) and New Hanover (part)
19th	Ted Davis Jr.	Republican	Wilmington	New Hanover (part)
20th	Rick Catlin (Note: Resigned August 15, 2016.)	Republican	Wilmington	New Hanover (part)
20th	Holly Grange (Note: Appointed August 29, 2016.)	Republican	Wilmington	New Hanover (part)
21st	Larry Bell	Democratic	Clinton	Wayne (part), Sampson (part), and Duplin (part)
22nd	William Brisson	Democratic	Dublin	Bladen (part), Sampson (part), and Johnston (part)
23rd	Shelly Willingham	Democratic	Rocky Mount	Edgecombe and Martin
24th	Jean Farmer-Butterfield	Democratic	Wilson	Wilson (part) and Pitt (part)
25th	Jeff Collins	Republican	Rocky Mount	Nash (part) and Franklin (part)
26th	Leo Daughtry	Republican	Smithfield	Johnston (part)
27th	Michael Wray	Democratic	Gaston	Halifax and Northampton
28th	James Langdon Jr.	Republican	Angier	Johnston (part)
29th	Larry Hall	Democratic	Durham	Durham (part)
30th	Paul Luebke (Note: Died October 29, 2016.)	Democratic	Durham	Durham (part)
30th	Philip Lehman (Note: Appointed November 10, 2016.)	Democratic	Durham	Durham (part)
31st	Mickey Michaux	Democratic	Durham	Durham (part)
32nd	Nathan Baskerville	Democratic	Henderson	Warren, Vance, and Granville (part)
33rd	Rosa Gill	Democratic	Raleigh	Wake (part)
34th	Grier Martin	Democratic	Raleigh	Wake (part)
35th	Chris Malone	Republican	Wake Forest	Wake (part)
36th	Nelson Dollar	Republican	Cary	Wake (part)
37th	Paul Stam	Republican	Apex	Wake (part)
38th	Yvonne Lewis Holley	Democratic	Raleigh	Wake (part)
39th	Darren Jackson	Democratic	Raleigh	Wake (part)
40th	Marilyn Avila	Republican	Raleigh	Wake (part)
41st	Gale Adcock	Democratic	Cary	Wake (part)
42nd	Marvin Lucas	Democratic	Spring Lake	Cumberland (part)
43rd	Elmer Floyd	Democratic	Fayetteville	Cumberland (part)
44th	Rick Glazier (Note: Resigned August 28, 2015.)	Democratic	Fayetteville	Cumberland (part)
44th	Billy Richardson (Note: Appointed September 1, 2015.)	Democratic	Fayetteville	Cumberland (part)
45th	John Szoka	Republican	Fayetteville	Cumberland (part)
46th	Ken Waddell	Democratic	Chadbourn	Columbus, Robeson (part), and Bladen (part)
47th	Charles Graham	Democratic	Lumberton	Robeson (part)
48th	Garland Pierce	Democratic	Wagram	Robeson (part), Hoke (part), Scotland (part), and Richmond (part)
49th	Gary Pendelton	Republican	Raleigh	Wake (part)
50th	Graig Meyer	Democratic	Hillsborough	Durham (part) and Orange (part)
51st	Brad Salmon	Democratic	Mamers	Harnett (part) and Lee (part)
52nd	James Boles	Republican	Whispering Pines	Moore (part)
53rd	David Lewis	Republican	Dunn	Harnett (part)
54th	Robert Reives	Democratic	Sanford	Chatham and Lee (part)
55th	Mark Brody	Republican	Monroe	Anson and Union (part)
56th	Verla Insko	Democratic	Chapel Hill	Orange (part)
57th	Pricey Harrison	Democratic	Greensboro	Guilford (part)
58th	Ralph Johnson (Note: Died March 15, 2016.)	Democratic	Greensboro	Guilford (part)
58th	Chris Sgro (Note: Appointed April 14, 2016.)	Democratic	Greensboro	Guilford (part)
59th	Jon Hardister	Republican	Greensboro	Guilford (part)
60th	Cecil Brockman	Democratic	High Point	Guilford (part)
61st	John Faircloth	Republican	High Point	Guilford (part)
62nd	John Blust	Republican	Greensboro	Guilford (part)
63rd	Stephen Ross	Republican	Burlington	Alamance (part)
64th	Dennis Riddell	Republican	Snow Camp	Alamance (part)
65th	Bert Jones	Republican	Reidsville	Caswell and Rockingham (part)
66th	Ken Goodman	Democratic	Rockingham	Robeson (part), Hoke (part), Scotland (part), Richmond (part), and Montgomery (part)
67th	Justin Burr	Republican	Albemarle	Stanly and Montgomery (part)
68th	Craig Horn	Republican	Weddington	Union (part)
69th	Dean Arp	Republican	Monroe	Union (part)
70th	Pat Hurley	Republican	Asheboro	Randolph (part)
71st	Evelyn Terry	Democratic	Winston-Salem	Forsyth (part)
72nd	Ed Hanes	Democratic	Winston-Salem	Forsyth (part)
73rd	Lee Zachary	Republican	Yadkinville	Yadkin, Wilkes (part), and Alexander
74th	Debra Conrad	Republican	Winston-Salem	Forsyth (part)
75th	Donny Lambeth	Republican	Winston-Salem	Forsyth (part)
76th	Carl Ford	Republican	China Grove	Rowan (part) and Cabarrus (part)
77th	Harry Warren	Republican	Salisbury	Rowan (part)
78th	Allen McNeill	Republican	Asheboro	Randolph (part) and Moore (part)
79th	Julia C. Howard	Republican	Mocksville	Davie and Forsyth (part)
80th	Sam Watford	Republican	Thomasville	Davidson (part)
81st	Rayne Brown	Republican	Lexington	Davidson (part)
82nd	Larry Pittman	Republican	Concord	Cabarrus (part)
83rd	Linda Johnson	Republican	Kannapolis	Cabarrus (part)
84th	Rena Turner	Republican	Olin	Iredell (part)
85th	Josh Dobson	Republican	Nebo	Avery, Mitchell, and McDowell
86th	Hugh Blackwell	Republican	Valdese	Burke (part)
87th	George Robinson	Republican	Lenoir	Caldwell
88th	Rob Bryan	Republican	Charlotte	Mecklenburg (part)
89th	Mitchell Setzer	Republican	Catawba	Catawba (part)
90th	Sarah Stevens	Republican	Mount Airy	Surry and Wilkes (part)
91st	Bryan Holloway (Note: Resigned October 23, 2015.)	Republican	King	Stokes and Rockingham (part)
91st	Kyle Hall (Note: Appointed November 9, 2015.)	Republican	King	Stokes and Rockingham (part)
92nd	Charles Jeter (Note: Resigned July 25, 2016.)	Republican	Huntersville	Mecklenburg (part)
92nd	Justin Moore (Note: Appointed August 23, 2016.)	Republican	Huntersville	Mecklenburg (part)
93rd	Jonathan Jordan	Republican	Jefferson	Ashe and Watauga
94th	Jeffrey Elmore	Republican	North Wilkesboro	Alleghany and Wilkes (part)
95th	John Fraley	Republican	Mooresville	Iredell (part)
96th	Jay Adams	Republican	Hickory	Catawba (part)
97th	Jason Saine	Republican	Lincolnton	Lincoln
98th	John Bradford	Republican	Cornelius	Mecklenburg (part)
99th	Rodney Moore	Democratic	Charlotte	Mecklenburg (part)
100th	Tricia Cotham	Democratic	Matthews	Mecklenburg (part)
101st	Beverly Earle	Democratic	Charlotte	Mecklenburg (part)
102nd	Becky Carney	Democratic	Charlotte	Mecklenburg (part)
103rd	Bill Brawley	Republican	Matthews	Mecklenburg (part)
104th	Dan Bishop	Republican	Charlotte	Mecklenburg (part)
105th	Jacqueline Schaffer (Note: Resigned April 22, 2016.)	Republican	Charlotte	Mecklenburg (part)
105th	Scott Stone (Note: Appointed May 12, 2016.)	Republican	Charlotte	Mecklenburg (part)
106th	Carla Cunningham	Democratic	Charlotte	Mecklenburg (part)
107th	Kelly Alexander	Democratic	Charlotte	Mecklenburg (part)
108th	John Torbett	Republican	Stanley	Gaston (part)
109th	Dana Bumgardner	Republican	Gastonia	Gaston (part)
110th	Kelly Hastings	Republican	Cherryville	Gaston (part) and Cleveland (part)
111th	Tim Moore	Republican	Kings Mountain	Cleveland (part)
112th	Mike Hager (Note: Resigned August 16, 2016.)	Republican	Rutherfordton	Rutherford and Burke (part)
112th	David Rogers (Note: Appointed August 19, 2016.)	Republican	Rutherfordton	Rutherford and Burke (part)
113th	Chris Whitmire	Republican	Rosman	Polk, Henderson (part), and Transylvania
114th	Susan Fisher	Democratic	Asheville	Buncombe (part)
115th	John Ager	Democratic	Fairview	Buncombe (part)
116th	Brian Turner	Democratic	Asheville	Buncombe (part)
117th	Chuck McGrady	Republican	Hendersonville	Henderson (part)
118th	Michele Presnell	Republican	Burnsville	Yancey, Madison, and Haywood (part)
119th	Joe Sam Queen	Democratic	Waynesville	Haywood (part), Jackson, and Swain
120th	Roger West	Republican	Marble	Graham, Cherokee, Clay, and Macon

== Senate ==
=== Senate leadership ===
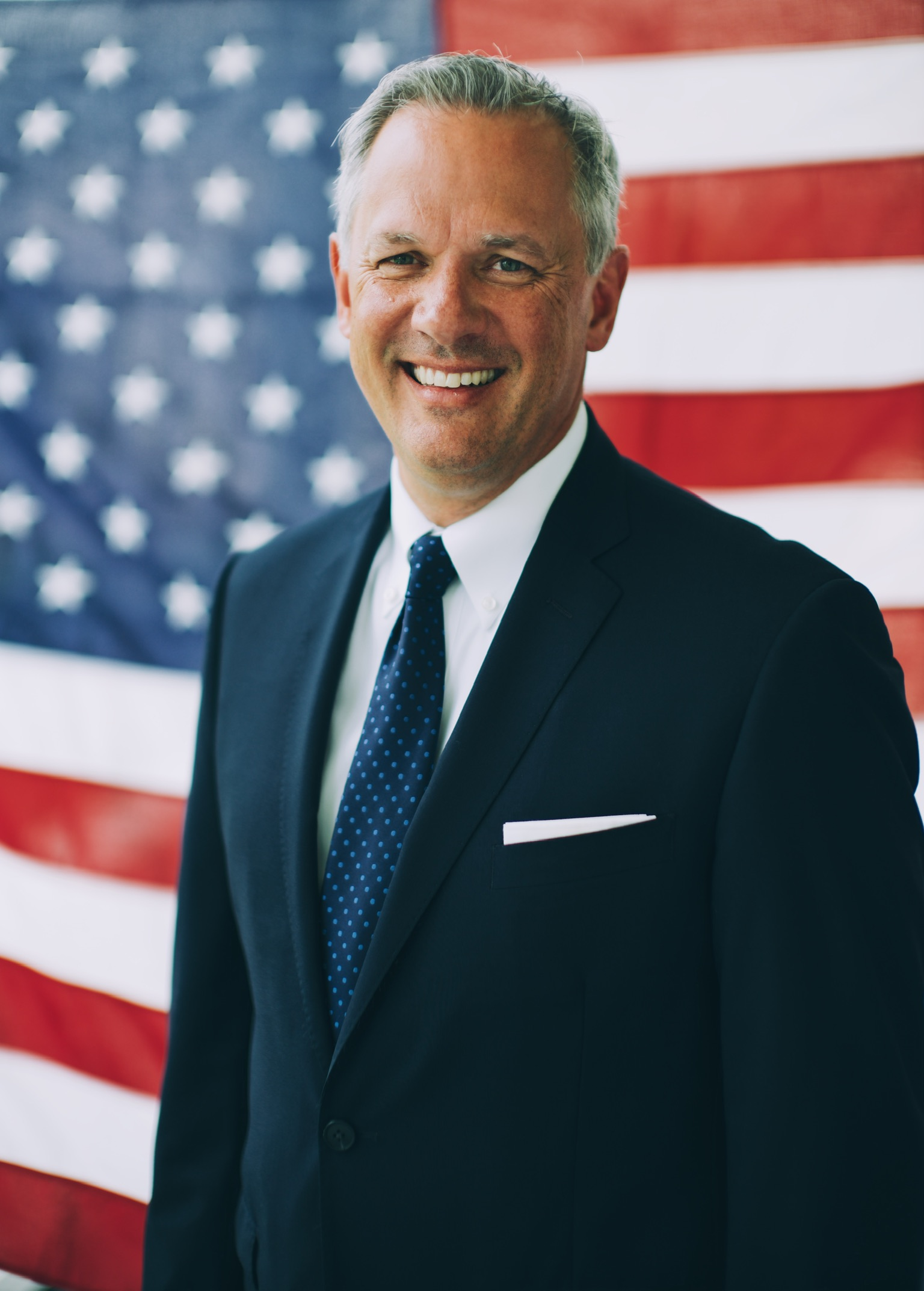
President of the Senate Dan Forest

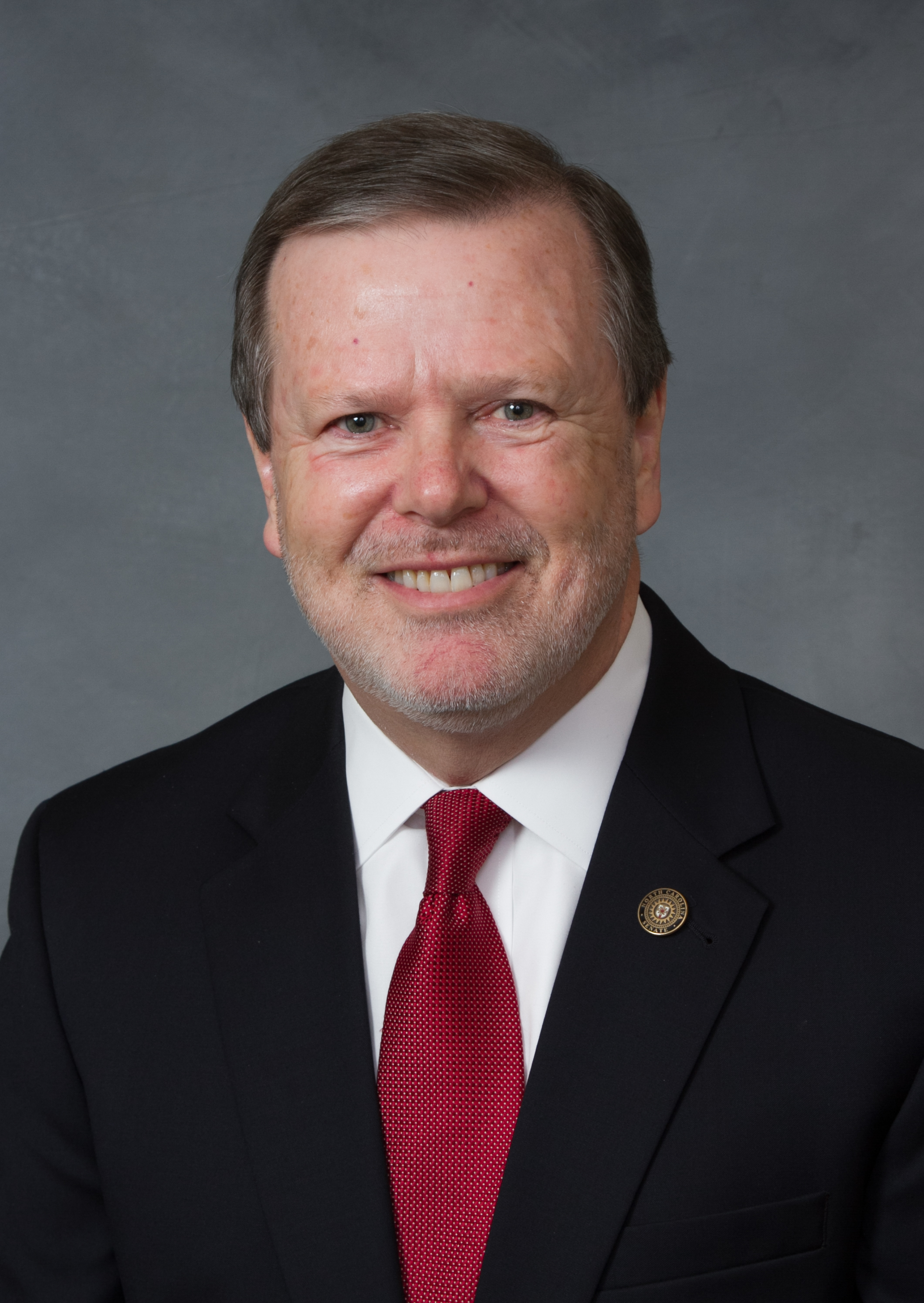
President Pro Tempore Phil Berger

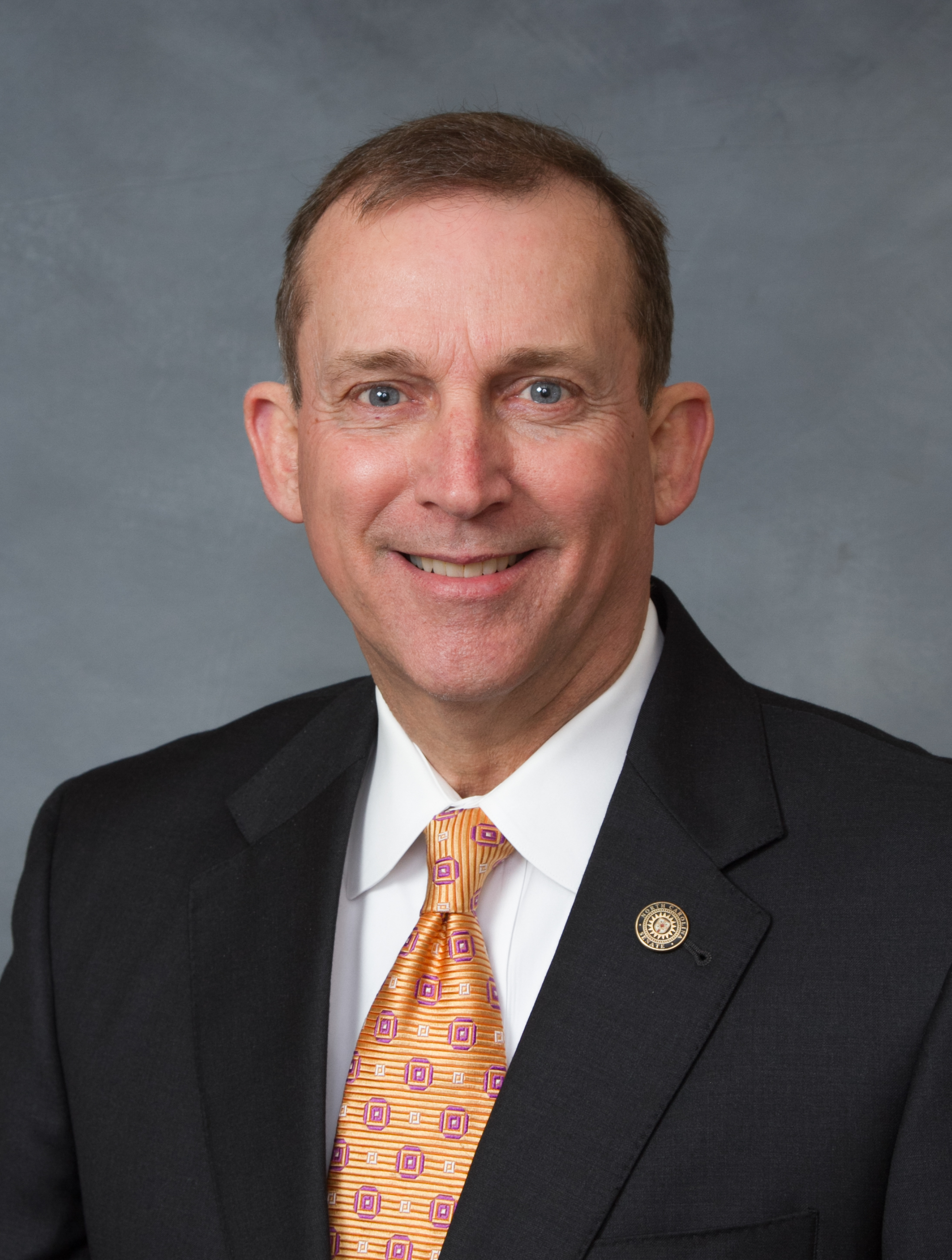
Majority Leader Harry Brown

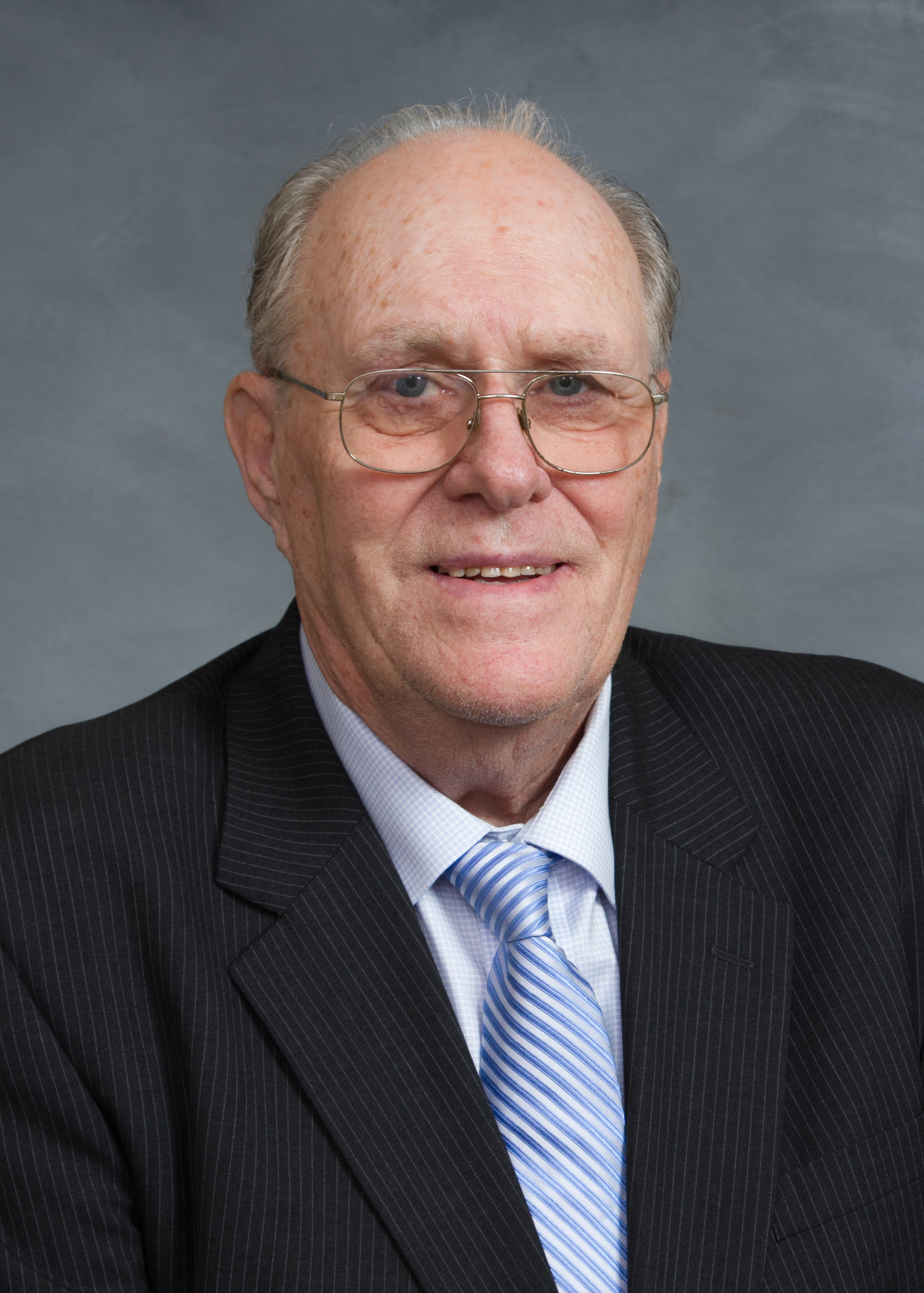
Majority Whip Jerry Tillman

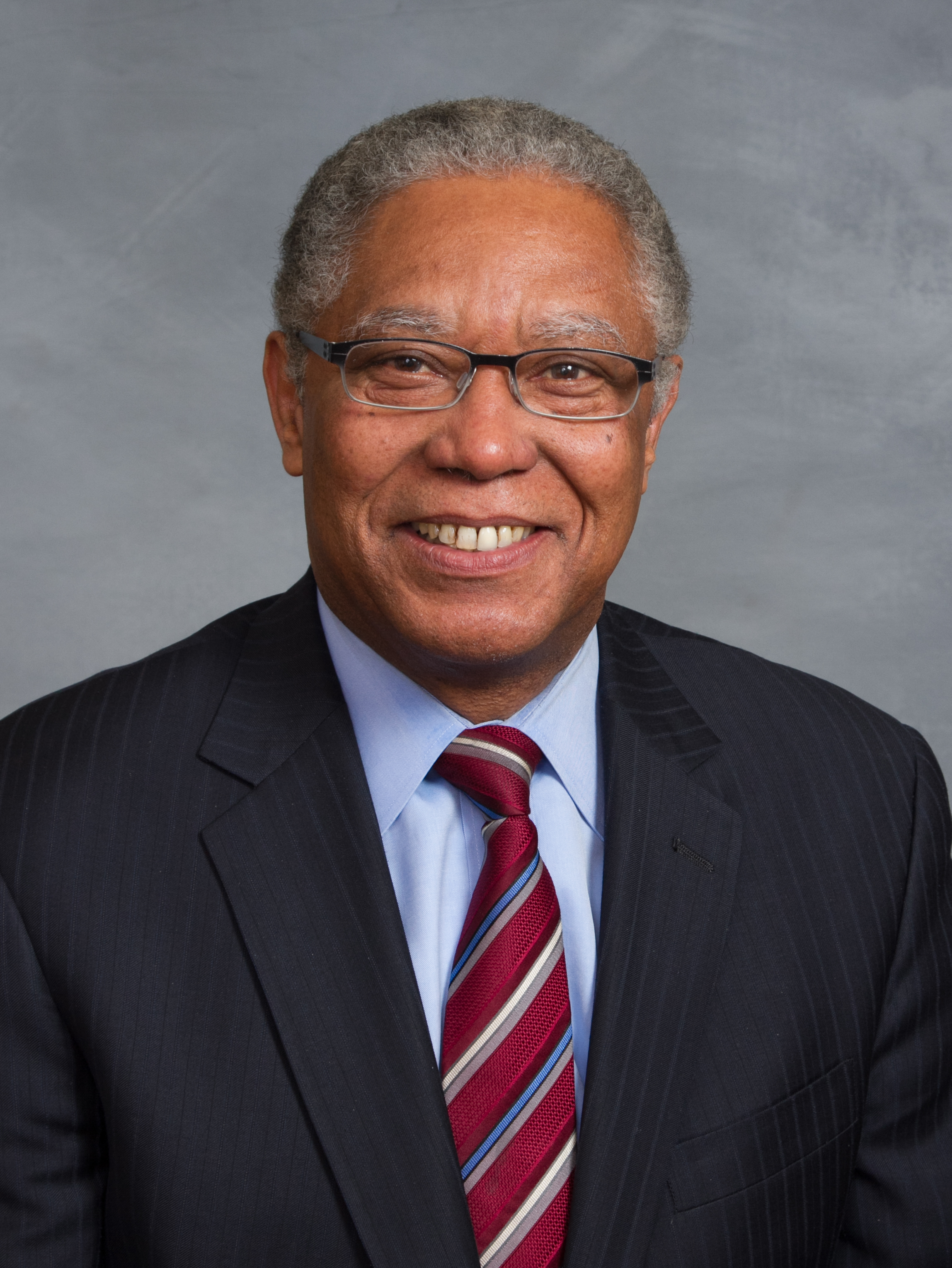
Minority Leader Dan Blue

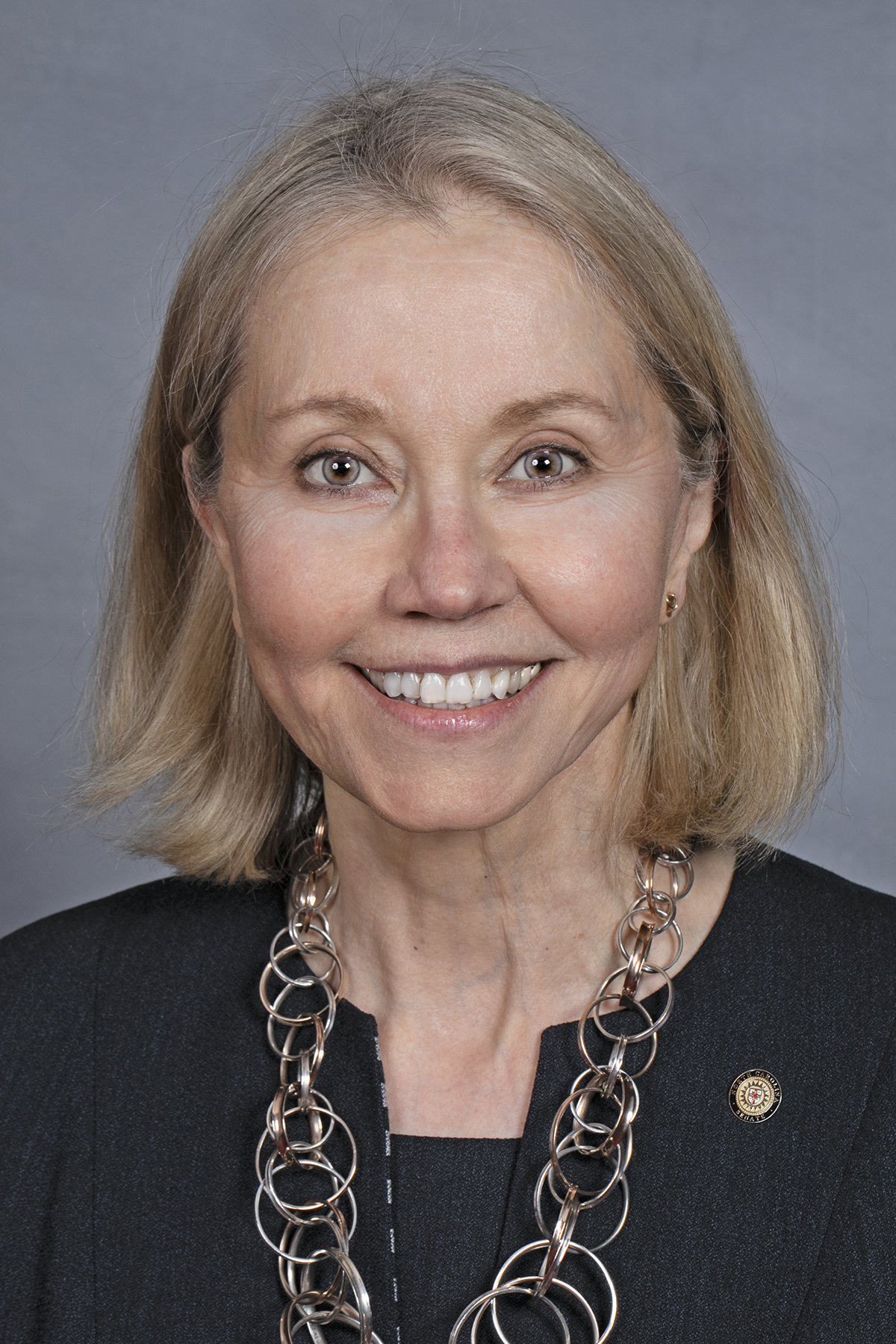
Minority Whip Terry Van Duyn

North Carolina Senate officers
Position	Name	Party
President Pro Tempore	Phil Berger	Republican
Deputy President Pro Tempore	Louis M. Pate Jr.	Republican
Majority Leader	Harry Brown	Republican
Majority Whip	Jerry W. Tillman	Republican
Majority Caucus Leader	Fletcher L. Hartsell Jr.	Republican
Minority Whip	Terry Van Duyn	Democratic
Minority Caucus Secretary	Ben Clark	Democratic

=== Members of the Senate ===
The Senate consisted of 50 members including 13 female, 11 African-American, 34 Republican, 16 Democrat, 10 new, and 40 returning senators. Fletcher L. Hartsell Jr. was the most senior senator with 13 terms in the Senate.

District	Senator	Party	Residence	Counties represented	First elected
1st	Bill Cook	Republican	Chocowinity	Beaufort, Camden, Currituck, Dare, Gates, Hyde, Pasquotank, Perquimans	2012
2nd	Norman Sanderson	Republican	Minnesott Beach	Carteret, Craven, Pamlico	2012
3rd	Erica Smith	Democratic	Henrico	Bertie, Chowan, Edgecombe, Hertford, Martin, Northampton, Tyrrell, Washington	2014
4th	Angela Bryant	Democratic	Rocky Mount	Halifax, Nash (part), Vance, Warren, Wilson (part)	2013↑
5th	Don Davis	Democratic	Greenville	Greene, Lenoir (part), Pitt (part), Wayne (part)	2012
6th	Harry Brown	Republican	Jacksonville	Jones, Onslow	2004
7th	Louis M. Pate Jr.	Republican	Mount Olive	Lenoir (part), Pitt (part), Wayne (part)	2012
8th	Bill Rabon	Republican	Winnabow	Bladen, Brunswick, New Hanover (part), Pender	2010
9th	Michael Lee	Republican	Wilmington	New Hanover (part)	2014↑
10th	Brent Jackson	Republican	Autryville	Duplin, Johnston (part), Sampson	2010
11th	Buck Newton	Republican	Wilson	Johnston (part), Nash (part), Wilson (part)	2010
12th	Ronald Rabin	Republican	Spring Lake	Harnett, Johnston (part), Lee	2012
13th	Jane Smith	Democratic	Lumberton	Columbus, Robeson	2014
14th	Dan Blue	Democratic	Raleigh	Wake (part)	2009↑
15th	John Alexander	Republican	Raleigh	Wake (part)	2014
16th	Josh Stein	Democratic	Raleigh	Wake (part)	2008
16th	Jay Chaudhuri (Note: Appointed April 19, 2016.)	Democratic	Raleigh	Wake (part)	2016↑
17th	Tamara Barringer	Republican	Cary	Wake (part)	2012↑
18th	Chad Barefoot	Republican	Wake Forest	Franklin, Wake (part)	2012
19th	Wesley Meredith	Republican	Fayetteville	Cumberland (part)	2010
20th	Floyd McKissick Jr.	Democratic	Durham	Durham (part), Granville	2007↑
21st	Ben Clark	Democratic	Raeford	Cumberland (part), Hoke	2012
22nd	Mike Woodard	Democratic	Durham	Caswell, Durham (part), Person	2012
23rd	Valerie Foushee	Democratic	Hillsborough	Chatham, Orange	2013↑
24th	Rick Gunn	Republican	Burlington	Alamance, Randolph (part)	2010
25th	Tom McInnis	Republican	Ellerbe	Anson, Richmond, Rowan (part), Scotland, Stanly	2014
26th	Phil Berger	Republican	Eden	Guilford (part), Rockingham	2000
27th	Trudy Wade	Republican	Jamestown	Guilford (part)	2012
28th	Gladys Robinson	Democratic	Greensboro	Guilford (part)	2010
29th	Jerry Tillman	Republican	Archdale	Moore, Randolph (part)	2002
30th	Shirley Randleman	Republican	Wilkesboro	Stokes, Surry, Wilkes	2012
31st	Joyce Krawiec	Republican	Kernersville	Forsyth (part), Yadkin	2014↑
32nd	Earline Parmon	Democratic	Winston-Salem	Forsyth (part)	2012
32nd	Paul Lowe Jr. (Note: Appointed January 30, 2015.)	Democratic	Winston-Salem	Forsyth (part)	2015↑
33rd	Stan Bingham	Republican	Denton	Davidson, Montgomery	2000
34th	Andrew Brock	Republican	Mocksville	Davie, Iredell (part), Rowan (part)	2002
35th	Tommy Tucker	Republican	Indian Trail, North Carolina	Union (part)	2010
36th	Fletcher L. Hartsell Jr.	Republican	Concord	Cabarrus, Union (part)	1990
37th	Jeff Jackson	Democratic	Charlotte	Mecklenburg (part)	2014↑
38th	Joel Ford	Democratic	Charlotte	Mecklenburg (part)	2012
39th	Bob Rucho	Republican	Matthews	Mecklenburg (part)	2008↑
40th	Joyce Waddell	Democratic	Charlotte	Mecklenburg (part)	2014
41st	Jeff Tarte	Republican	Cornelius	Mecklenburg (part)	2012
42nd	Andy Wells	Republican	Hickory	Alexander, Catawba	2014
43rd	Kathy Harrington	Republican	Gastonia	Gaston (part)	2010
44th	David Curtis	Republican	Lincolnton	Gaston (part), Iredell (part), Lincoln	2012
45th	Dan Soucek	Republican	Boone	Alleghany, Ashe, Avery, Caldwell, Watauga	2010
45th	Deanna Ballard (Note: Appointed April 26, 2016.)	Republican	Blowing Rock	Alleghany, Ashe, Avery, Caldwell, Watauga	2016↑
46th	Warren Daniel	Republican	Morganton	Burke, Cleveland	2010
47th	Ralph Hise	Republican	Spruce Pine	Madison, McDowell, Mitchell, Polk, Rutherford, Yancey	2010
48th	Tom Apodaca	Republican	Hendersonville	Buncombe (part), Henderson, Transylvania	2002
48th	Chuck Edwards (Note: Appointed August 19, 2016.)	Republican	Flat Rock	Buncombe (part), Henderson, Transylvania	2016↑
49th	Terry Van Duyn	Democratic	Asheville	Buncombe (part)	2014↑
50th	Jim Davis	Republican	Franklin	Cherokee, Clay, Graham, Haywood, Jackson, Macon, Swain	2010

- ↑: Member was first appointed to office.

== See also ==
- 2014 North Carolina Senate election
- 2014 United States House of Representatives elections in North Carolina
- List of North Carolina state legislatures
