= North Carolina General Assembly of 2013–14 =

Legislative term in US state of North Carolina

151st North Carolina General Assembly 2013–14
←	2011–12	2015–16	→
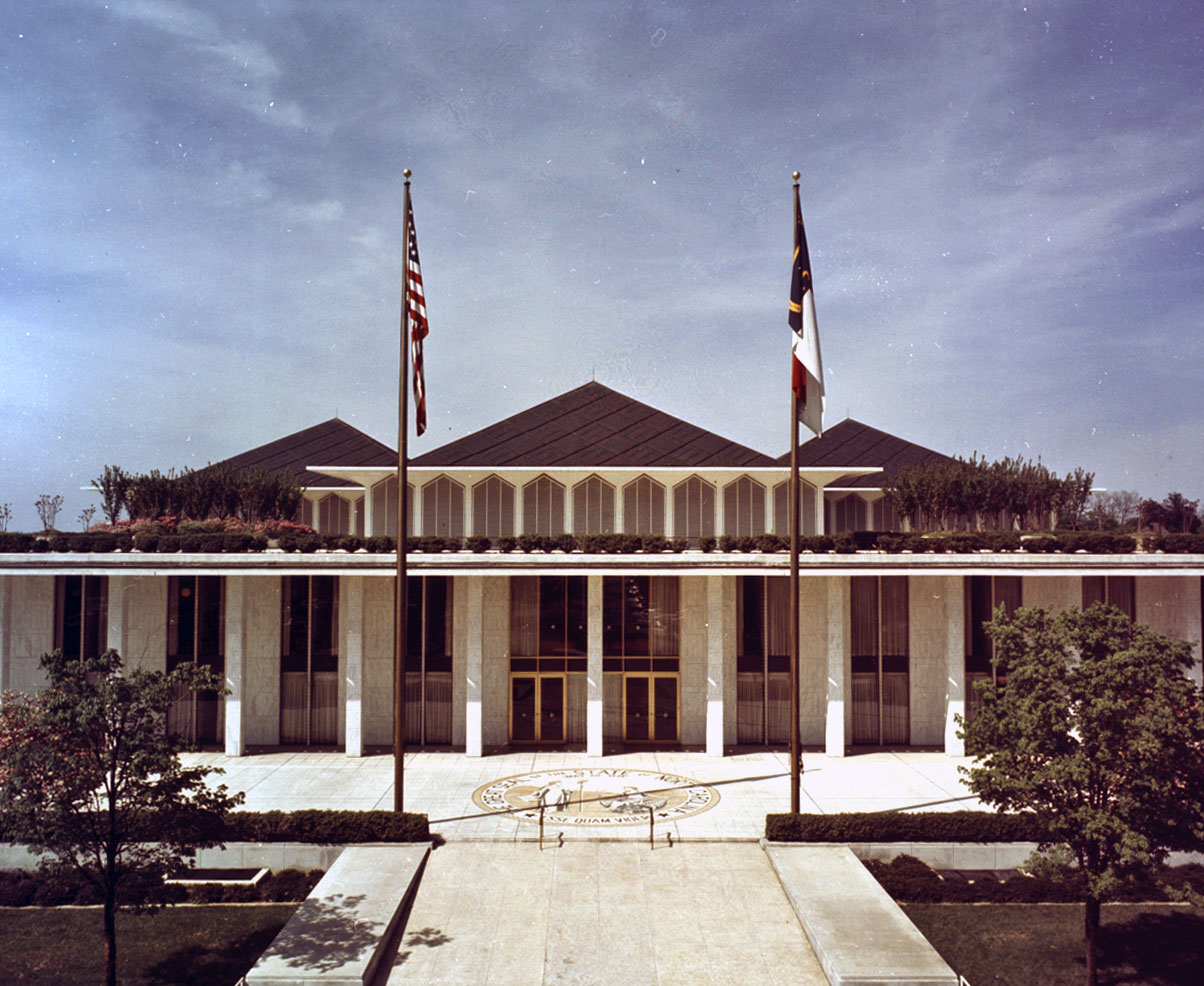
- North Carolina Legislative Building

Overview
- Legislative body: North Carolina General Assembly
- Jurisdiction: North Carolina, United States
- Meeting place: State Legislative Building in Raleigh
- Term: 2013–14
- Website: House Senate

North Carolina Senate
- Members: 50 senators
- President pro tempore: Phil Berger (Rep)
- Majority Leader: Harry Brown (Rep)
- Minority Leader: Dan Blue (Dem)
- Party control: Republican Party

North Carolina House of Representatives
- Members: 120 representatives
- Speaker: Thom Tillis (Rep)
- Majority Leader: Edgar V. Starnes (Rep)
- Minority Leader: Larry Hall (Dem)
- Party control: Republican Party

The North Carolina General Assembly 2013–14 session is the state legislature that first convened on January 9, 2013, and concluded (adjourned sine die) on August 20, 2014. Members of the North Carolina Senate and the North Carolina House of Representatives were elected on November 6, 2012, when the Republican Party increased the size of its majorities in both the North Carolina Senate and House of Representative to exceed the three-fifths number of elected members required for a super-majority.

== House of Representatives ==
At the beginning of the session 2013–2014 session, the North Carolina House of Representatives consisted of 77 Republicans and 43 Democrats. Accounting for vacancies and appointments to date, as of January 12, 2014, there are 77 Republicans and 42 Democrats in office. As of January 12, 2014, there is one unfilled vacancy, created by the resignation of Rep. Deb McManus (D) on December 11, 2013. McManus represented the 54th House district, which includes all of Chatham County and parts of Lee County.

The 120 members of the House included 27 women, 22 African Americans and one Native American.

=== House leadership ===
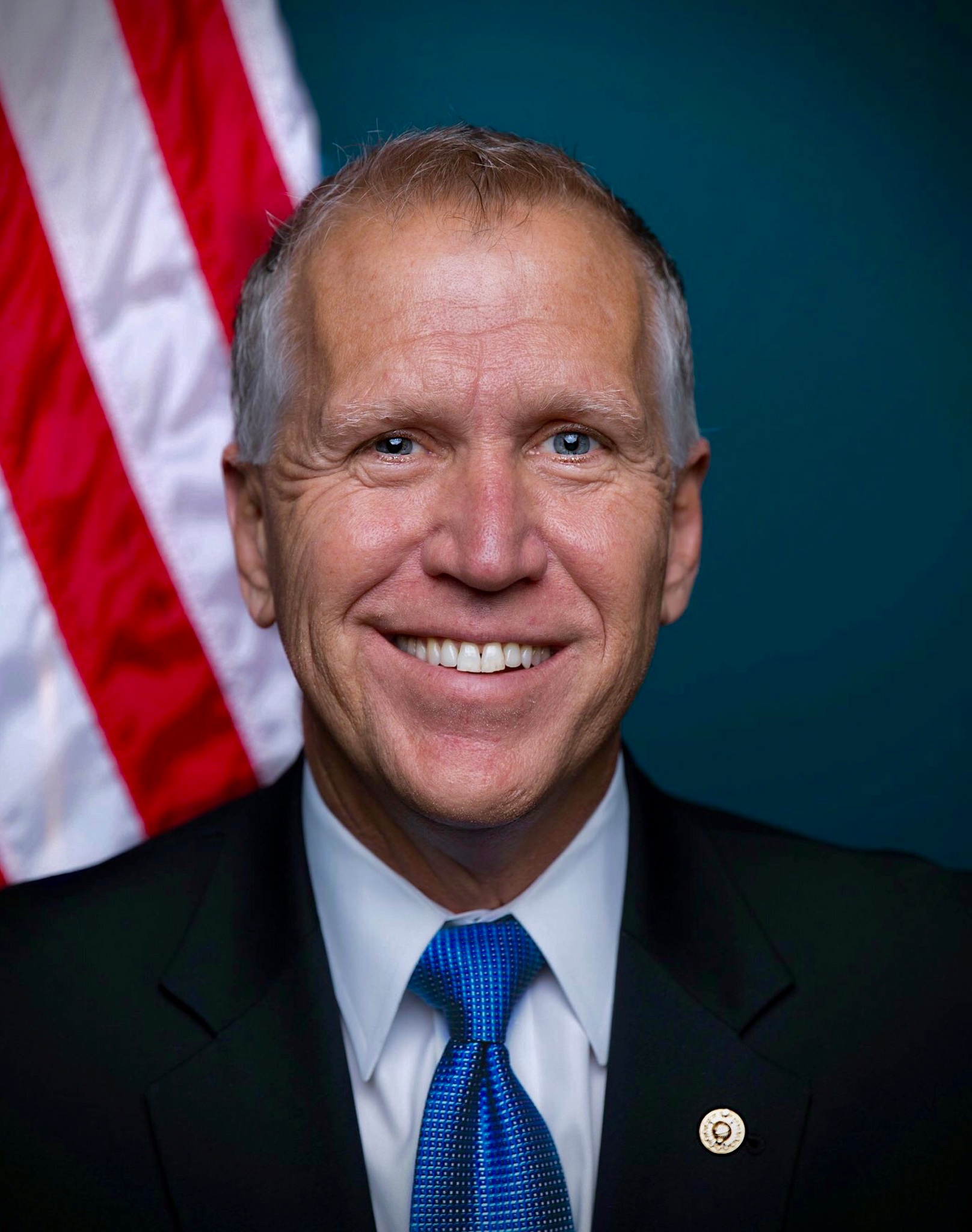
Speaker Thom Tillis

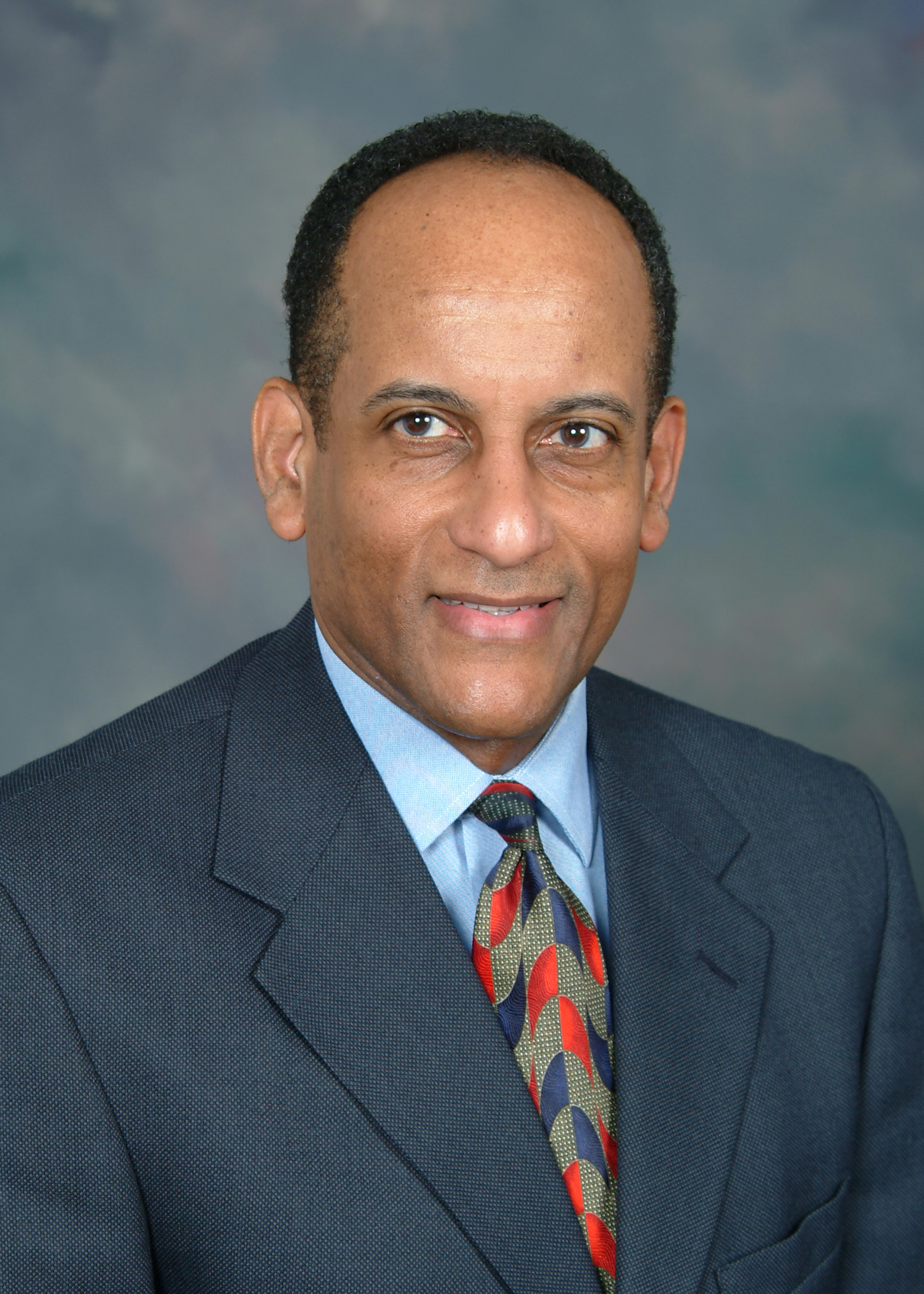
Minority Leader Larry Hall

The following members were the leadership of the House of Representatives:

North Carolina House officers
Position	Name	Party
Speaker pro tempore	Paul Stam	Republican
Majority Leader	Edgar V. Starnes	Republican
Majority Whip	Mike Hager	Republican
Deputy Majority Whips	Pat McElraft	Republican
Deputy Majority Whips	James L. Boles Jr.	Republican
Majority Conference Leader	Ruth Samuelson	Republican
Deputy Minority Leader	Michael H. Wray	Democratic
Republican Freshman Leader	Rick Catlin	Republican
Democratic Whips	Winkie Wilkins	Democratic
Democratic Whips	Susan C. Fisher	Democratic
Democratic Whips	Rosa Gill	Democratic
Democratic Conference Co-Chair	Deborah Ross	Democratic
Democratic Conference Co-Chair	Marvin W. Lucas	Democratic

== Senate ==
At the beginning of the session 2013–2014 session, the North Carolina Senate consisted of 33 Republicans and 17 Democrats. Accounting for vacancies and appointments to date, as of April 8, 2014, there are 33 Republicans and 15 Democrats in office. In December, there was one vacancy, created by the resignation of Sen. Peter S. Brunstetter (R) on December 15, 2013. Brunstetter represented the 31st Senate district, which consists of parts of Forsyth County and all of Yadkin County. The seat was filled by appointee Joyce Krawiec, former vice chairwoman of the state GOP. There is now a vacancy in the late Sen. Martin Nesbitt's (D) seat, 49th Senate district (Buncombe County), since his passing on March 6, 2014. Additionally, there is a vacancy for Dan Clodfelter's (D) seat after he resigned on April 8, 2014, due to be appointed Mayor of Charlotte by the City Council after the resignation of Patrick Cannon on March 26, 2014.

The Senate members included 10 women and 10 African-American members.

=== Senate leadership ===
Senate leadership included the following

North Carolina Senate officers
Position	Name	Party
President Pro Tem	Phil Berger	Republican
Deputy President Pro Tempore	Louis M. Pate Jr.	Republican
Majority Leader	Harry Brown	Republican
Majority Whip	Jerry W. Tillman	Republican
Majority Caucus Secretary	Fletcher L. Hartsell Jr.	Republican
Joint Majority Caucus Leader	Andrew C. Brock	Republican
Minority Leader	Dan Blue	Democratic
Deputy Minority Leaders	Clark Jenkins	Democratic
Deputy Minority Leaders	Floyd McKissick Jr.	Democratic
Deputy Minority Leaders	Gladys A. Robinson	Democratic
Minority Whip	Josh Stein	Democratic
Democratic Caucus Chair	Dan Clodfelter (resigned April 8, 2014)	Democratic

== See also ==
- List of North Carolina state legislatures
