= North Carolina General Assembly of 2011–12 =

Legislative term in US state of North Carolina

150th North Carolina General Assembly 2011–12
←	2009–10	2013–14	→
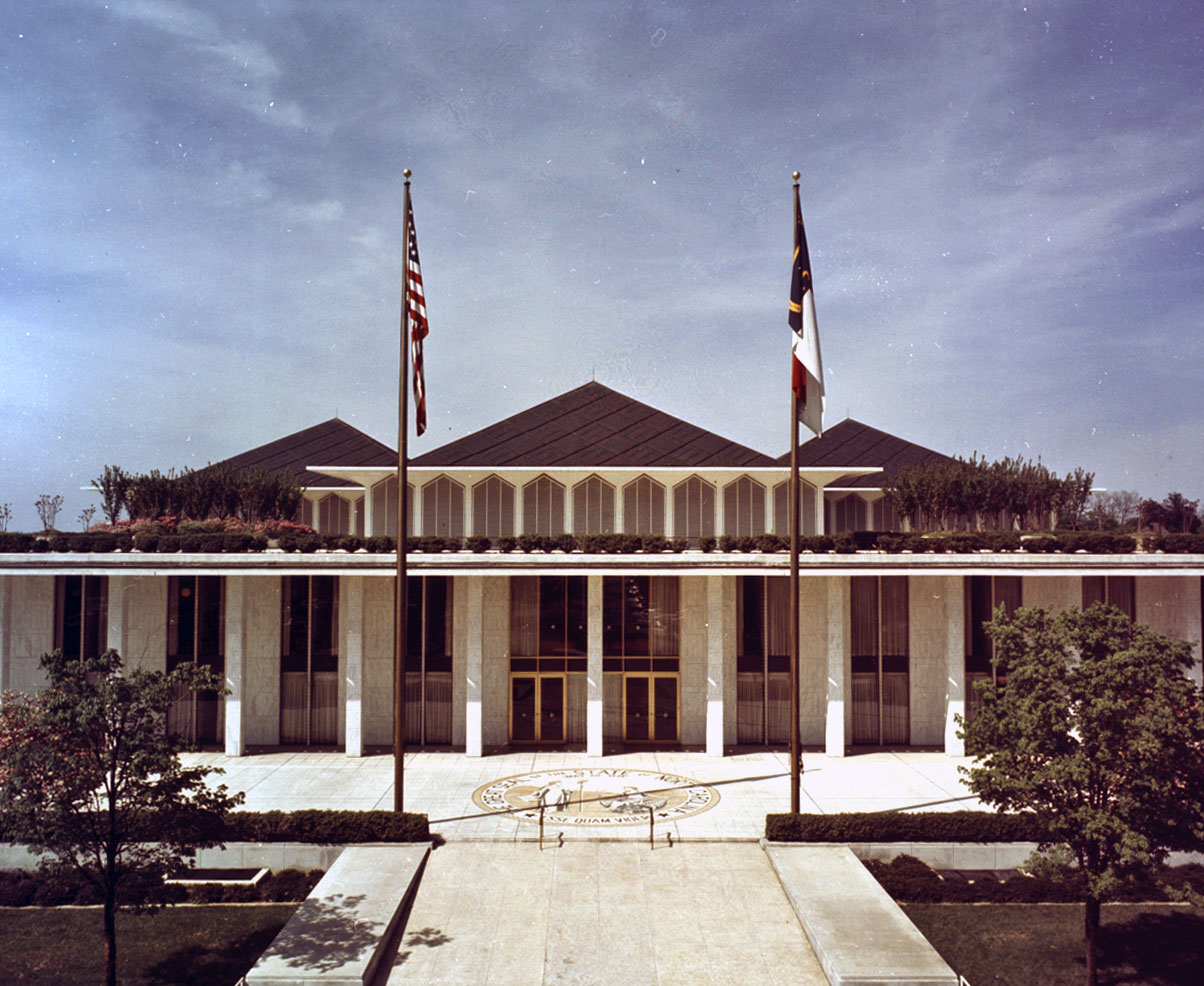
- North Carolina Legislative Building

Overview
- Legislative body: North Carolina General Assembly
- Jurisdiction: North Carolina, United States
- Meeting place: State Legislative Building, Raleigh
- Term: 2011–12
- Website: House Senate

North Carolina Senate
- Members: 50 senators
- President pro tempore: Phil Berger (Rep)
- Majority Leader: Harry Brown (Rep)
- Minority Leader: Martin Nesbitt (Dem)
- Party control: Republican Party

North Carolina House of Representatives
- Members: 120 representatives
- Speaker: Thom Tillis (Rep)
- Majority Leader: Paul Stam (Rep)
- Minority Leader: Joe Hackney (Dem)
- Party control: Republican Party

The North Carolina General Assembly 2011–12 was the state legislature that first convened on January 26, 2011, and concluded in December 2012. Members of the North Carolina Senate and the North Carolina House of Representatives were elected on November 2, 2010. This 149th North Carolina General Assembly was the first North Carolina General Assembly with a Republican majority in both chambers since 1870.

== Legislation ==
A complete list of session laws passed by this legislature is found at 2011 Session laws. There were 419 laws passed in 2011 and 203 in 2012. Among the Session laws that passed was 2011-409, "AN ACT TO AMEND THE CONSTITUTION TO PROVIDE THAT MARRIAGE BETWEEN ONE MAN AND ONE WOMAN IS THE ONLY DOMESTIC LEGAL UNION THAT SHALL BE VALID OR RECOGNIZED IN THIS STATE."

== State House of Representatives ==
The North Carolina state House of Representatives, during the 2011–12 session, consisted of 68 Republicans and 52 Democrats. At the beginning of the session, there was one independent member, Rep. Bert Jones, who caucused with the Republicans, but he formally changed his registration to Republican around September 2011. The members included 35 women, 18 African Americans, and one Native American out of 120 members.

=== House leadership ===
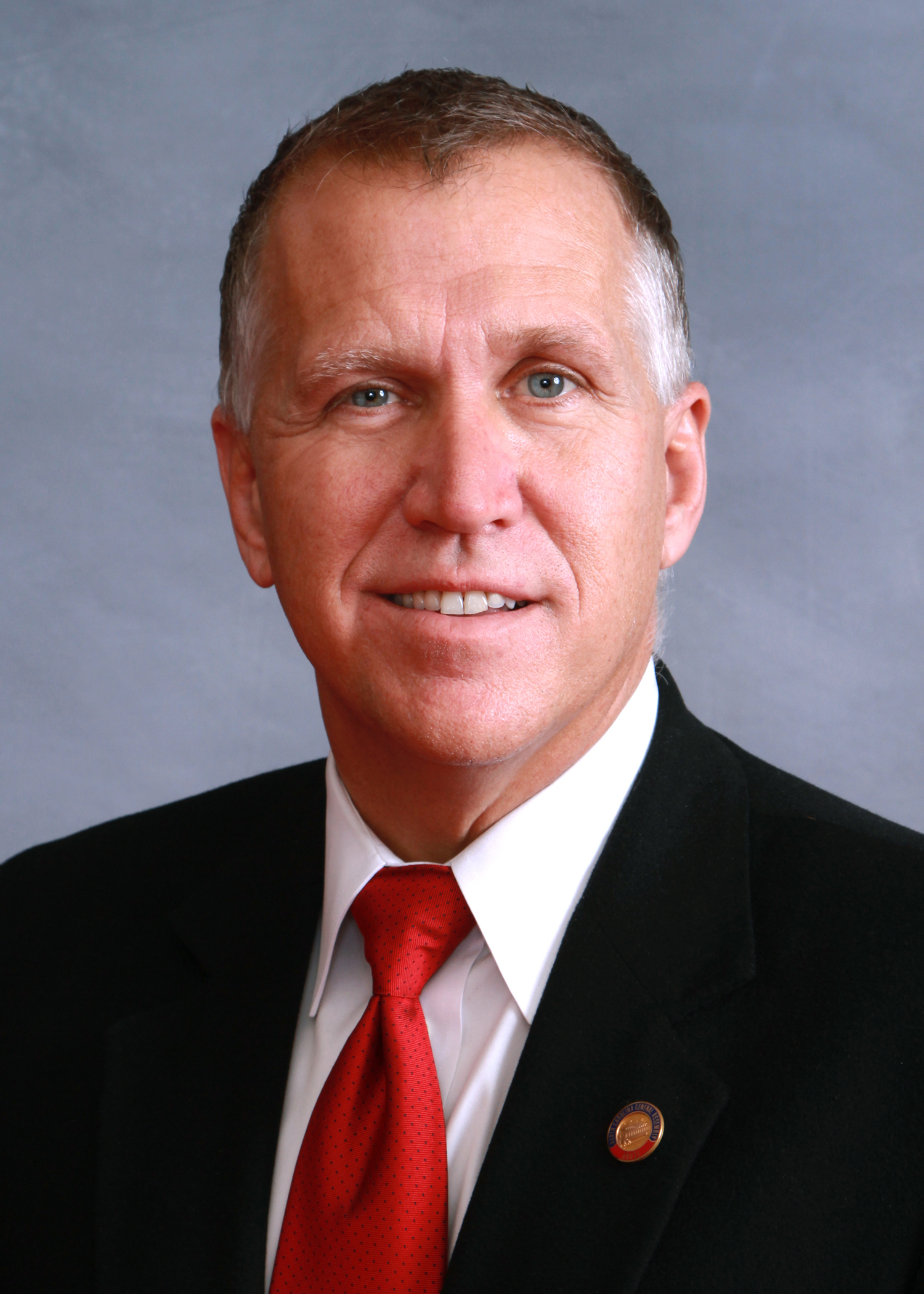
Speaker Thom Tillis

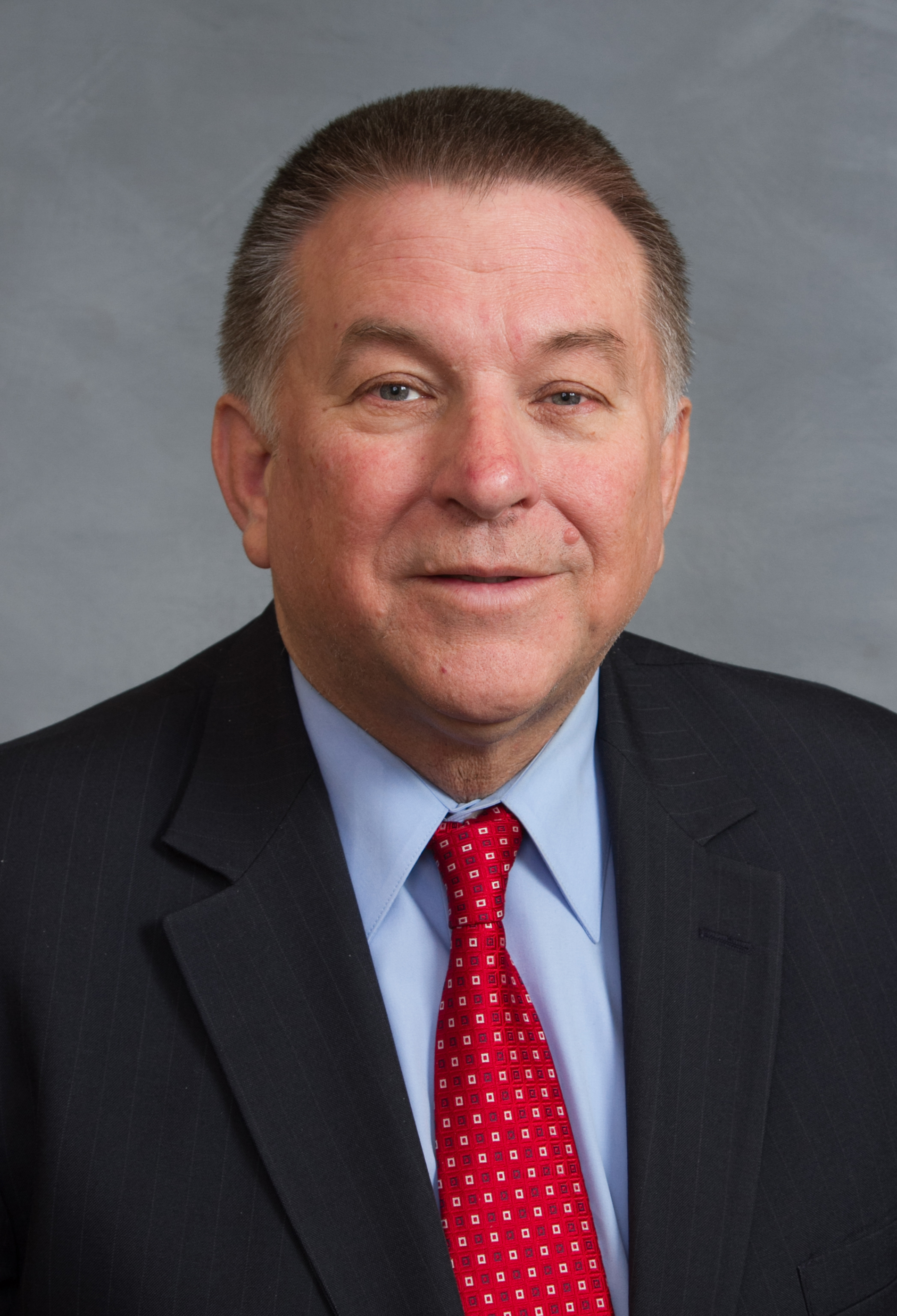
Majority Leader Paul Stam

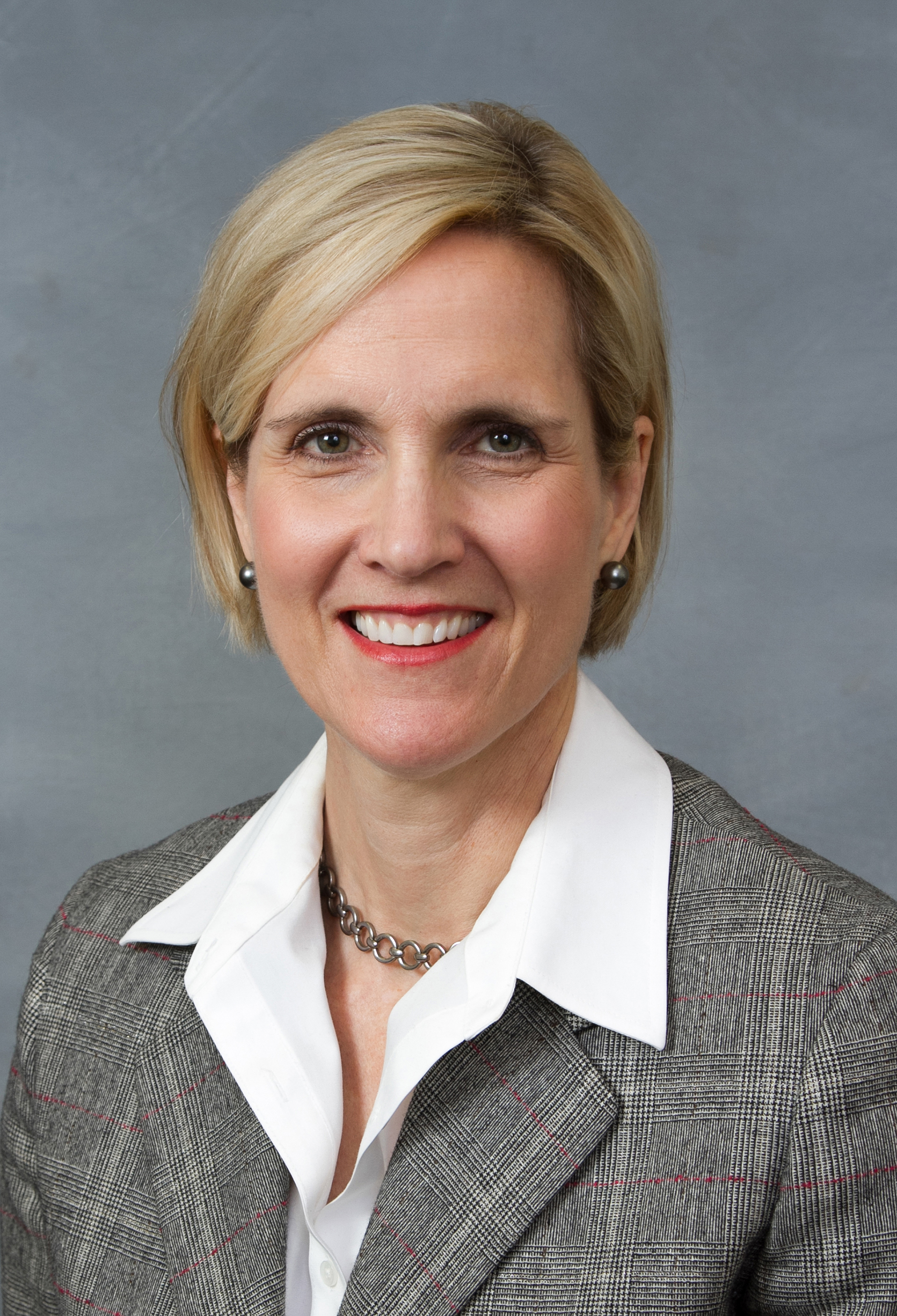
Majority Whip Ruth Samuelson

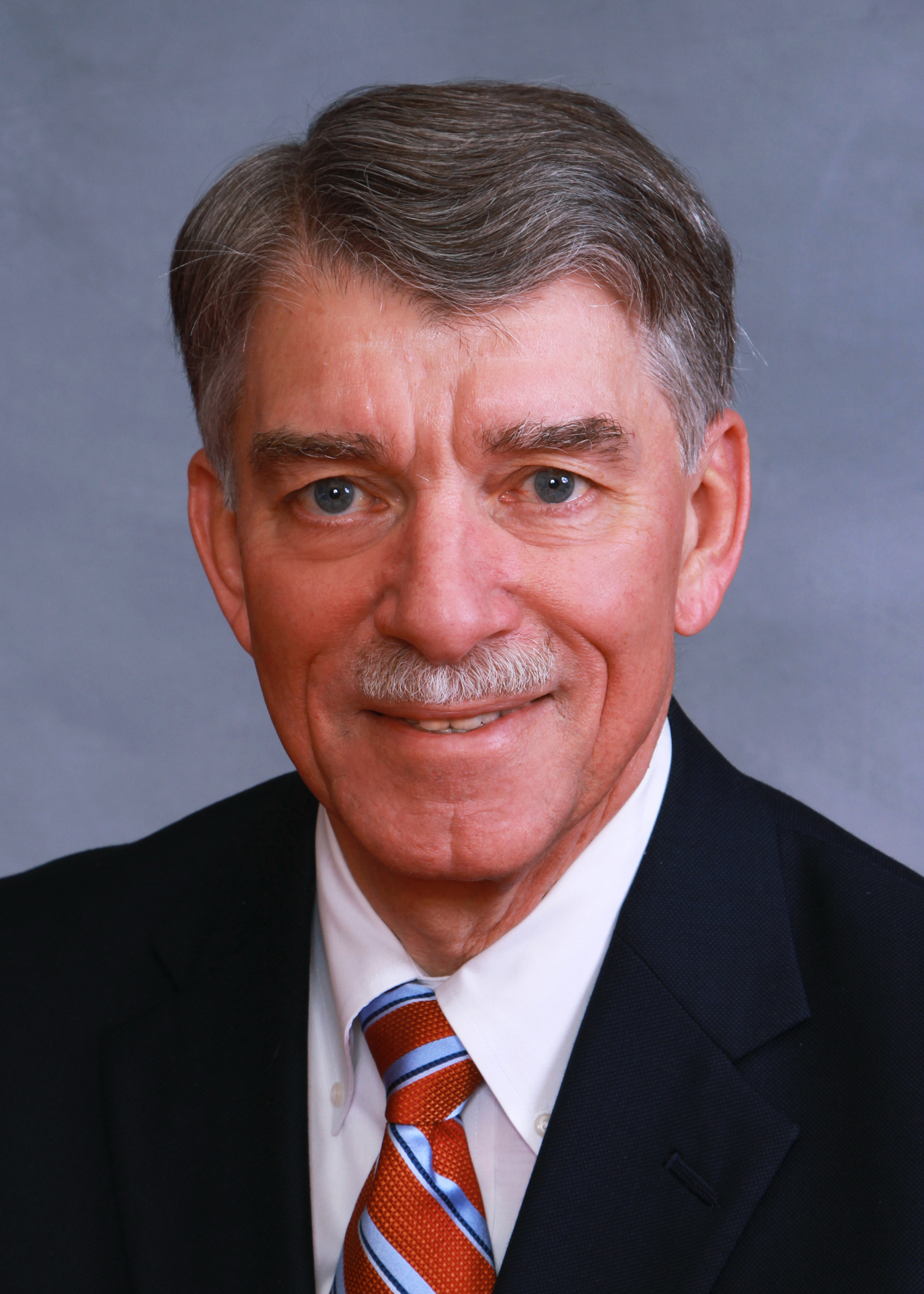
Minority Leader Joe Hackney, Dem.

The following members were the leadership of the House of Representatives:

North Carolina House officers
Position	Name	Party
Speaker pro tempore	Dale Folwell	Republican
Majority Leader	Paul Stam	Republican
Majority Whip	Ruth Samuelson	Republican
Deputy Majority Whips	Pat McElraft	Republican
Deputy Majority Whips	Jonathan Jordan	Republican
Deputy Minority Leader	William L. Wainwright (until his death on July 17, 2012)	Democratic
Republican Freshman Leader	Mike Hager	Republican
Joint Caucus Leader	Marilyn Avila	Republican
Minority Whips	Rick Glazier	Democratic
Minority Whips	Larry Hall	Democratic
Minority Whips	Ray Rapp	Democratic
Minority Whips	Deborah Ross	Democratic
Minority Whips	Michael H. Wray	Democratic

=== House members ===
The following were the members of the House of Representatives during 2011–2012:

District	Representative	Party	Residence
1st	William C. Owens Jr.	Democratic	Elizabeth City
2nd	Timothy L. Spear	Democratic	Creswell
3rd	Norman W. Sanderson	Republican	Arapahoe
4th	Jimmy Dixon	Republican	Calypso
5th	Annie Mobley	Democratic	Ahoskie
6th	Bill Cook	Republican	Chocowinity
7th	Angela Bryant	Democratic	Rocky Mount
8th	Edith D. Warren	Democratic	Farmville
9th	Marian N. McLawhorn	Democratic	Grifton
10th	Stephen A. LaRoque (until August 1, 2012)	Republican	Kinston
10th	Karen Kozel (from August 29, 2012)	Republican	Kinston
11th	Efton Sager	Republican	Goldsboro
12th	William L. Wainwright (until July 17, 2012)	Democratic	Havelock
12th	Barbara Lee (from August 6, 2012)	Democratic	Havelock
13th	Pat McElraft	Republican	Emerald Isle
14th	George G. Cleveland	Republican	Jacksonville
15th	Phil Shepard	Republican	Jacksonville
16th	Carolyn H. Justice	Republican	Hampstead
17th	Frank Iler	Republican	Oak Island
18th	Susi Hamilton	Democratic	Wilmington
19th	Daniel F. McComas (until September 2, 2012)	Republican	Wilmington
19th	Ted Davis Jr. (from September 26, 2012)	Republican	Wilmington
20th	Dewey L. Hill	Democratic	Whiteville
21st	Larry M. Bell	Democratic	Clinton
22nd	William Brisson	Democratic	Dublin
23rd	Joe P. Tolson	Democratic	Pinetops
24th	Jean Farmer-Butterfield	Democratic	Wilson
25th	Jeff Collins	Republican	Rocky Mount
26th	N. Leo Daughtry	Republican	Smithfield
27th	Michael H. Wray	Democratic	Gaston
28th	James Langdon Jr.	Republican	Angier
29th	Larry Hall	Democratic	Durham
30th	Paul Luebke	Democratic	Durham
31st	Mickey Michaux	Democratic	Durham
32nd	James W. Crawford Jr.	Democratic	Oxford
33rd	Rosa Gill	Democratic	Raleigh
34th	Grier Martin	Democratic	Raleigh
35th	Jennifer Weiss	Democratic	Raleigh
36th	Nelson Dollar	Republican	Cary
37th	Paul Stam	Republican	Apex
38th	Deborah Ross	Democratic	Raleigh
39th	Darren Jackson	Democratic	Raleigh
40th	Marilyn Avila	Republican	Raleigh
41st	Tom Murry	Republican	Morrisville
42nd	Marvin W. Lucas	Democratic	Spring Lake
43rd	Elmer Floyd	Democratic	Fayetteville
44th	Diane Parfitt	Democratic	Fayetteville
45th	Rick Glazier	Democratic	Fayetteville
46th	G. L. Pridgenn	Republican	Lumberton
47th	Charles Graham	Democratic	Lumberton
48th	Garland E. Pierce	Democratic	Wagram
49th	Glen Bradley	Republican	Youngsville
50th	Bill Faison	Democratic	Durham
51st	Mike C. Stone	Republican	Sanford
52nd	James L. Boles Jr.	Republican	Southern Pines
53rd	David R. Lewis	Republican	Dunn
54th	Joe Hackney	Democratic	Chapel Hill
55th	Winkie Wilkins	Democratic	Roxboro
56th	Verla C. Insko	Democratic	Chapel Hill
57th	Pricey Harrison	Democratic	Greensboro
58th	Alma Adams	Democratic	Greensboro
59th	Maggie Jeffus	Democratic	Greensboro
60th	Marcus Brandon	Democratic	Greensboro
61st	John Faircloth	Republican	High Point
62nd	John Blust	Republican	Greensboro
63rd	Alice L. Bordsen	Democratic	Mebane
64th	Dan Ingle	Republican	Burlington
65th	Bert Jones	Independent	Reidsville
65th	Bert Jones	Republican (Note: Elected as Independent; Republican from September 2011.)	Reidsville
66th	Ken Goodman	Democratic	Rockingham
67th	Justin Burr	Republican	Albemarle
68th	D. Craig Horn	Republican	Weddington
69th	Pryor A. Gibson III (until March 3, 2011)	Democratic	Wadesboro
69th	Frank McGuirt (from March 7, 2011)	Democratic	Wingate
70th	Pat Hurley	Republican	Asheboro
71st	Larry W. Womble	Democratic	Winston-Salem
72nd	Earline Parmon	Democratic	Winston-Salem
73rd	Larry R. Brown (until August 16, 2012)	Republican	Kernersville
73rd	Joyce Krawiec (from October 10, 2012)	Republican	Kernersville
74th	Dale Folwell	Republican	Winston-Salem
75th	William C. McGee	Republican	Clemmons
76th	Fred F. Steen II	Republican	Landis
77th	Harry J. Warren	Republican	Salisbury
78th	Harold J. Brubaker (until July 12, 2012)	Republican	Asheboro
78th	Allen McNeill (from August 13, 2012)	Republican	Asheboro
79th	Julia C. Howard	Republican	Mocksville
80th	Jerry Dockham	Republican	Denton
81st	Rayne Brown	Republican	Lexington
82nd	Jeffrey L. Barnhart (until September 30, 2011)	Republican	Concord
82nd	Larry Pittman (from October 10, 2011)	Republican	Concord
83rd	Linda P. Johnson	Republican	Kannapolis
84th	Phillip D. Frye	Republican	Spruce Pine
85th	Mitch Gillespie	Republican	Marion
86th	Hugh Blackwell	Republican	Valdese
87th	Edgar V. Starnes	Republican	Hickory
88th	Mark Hollo	Republican	Taylorsville
89th	Mitchell S. Setzer	Republican	Catawba
90th	Sarah Stevens	Republican	Mt. Airy
91st	Bryan R. Holloway	Republican	King
92nd	Darrell McCormick	Republican	Winston-Salem
93rd	Jonathan Jordan	Republican	Jefferson
94th	Shirley B. Randleman	Republican	Wilkesboro
95th	Grey Mills	Republican	Mooresville
96th	Mark K. Hilton	Republican	Conover
97th	Johnathan Rhyne Jr. (until August 15, 2011)	Republican	Lincolnton
97th	Jason Saine (from August 24, 2011)	Republican	Denver
98th	Thom Tillis	Republican	Cornelius
99th	Rodney W. Moore	Democratic	Charlotte
100th	Tricia Cotham	Democratic	Charlotte
101st	Beverly M. Earle	Democratic	Charlotte
102nd	Becky Carney	Democratic	Charlotte
103rd	William M. Brawley	Republican	Matthews
104th	Ruth Samuelson	Republican	Charlotte
105th	Ric Killian	Republican	Charlotte
106th	Martha B. Alexander	Democratic	Charlotte
107th	Kelly Alexander	Democratic	Charlotte
108th	John Torbett	Republican	Stanley
109th	William Current	Republican	Gastonia
110th	Kelly Hastings	Republican	Cherryville
111th	Tim Moore	Republican	Kings Mountain
112th	Mike Hager	Republican	Rutherfordton
113th	David Guice (until January 1, 2012)	Republican	Brevard
113th	Trudi Walend (from January 4, 2012)	Republican	Brevard
114th	Susan C. Fisher	Democratic	Asheville
115th	Patsy Keever	Democratic	Asheville
116th	Tim Moffitt	Republican	Asheville
117th	Chuck McGrady	Republican	Hendersonville
118th	Ray Rapp	Democratic	Mars Hill
119th	R. Phillip Haire	Democratic	Sylva
120th	Roger West	Republican	Marble

== State Senate ==
The state Senate, during the 2011–12 session, consisted of 31 Republicans and 19 Democrats. The senate members included six females and six African-Americans, as well as 15 attorneys and three small business owners.

=== Senate leaders ===
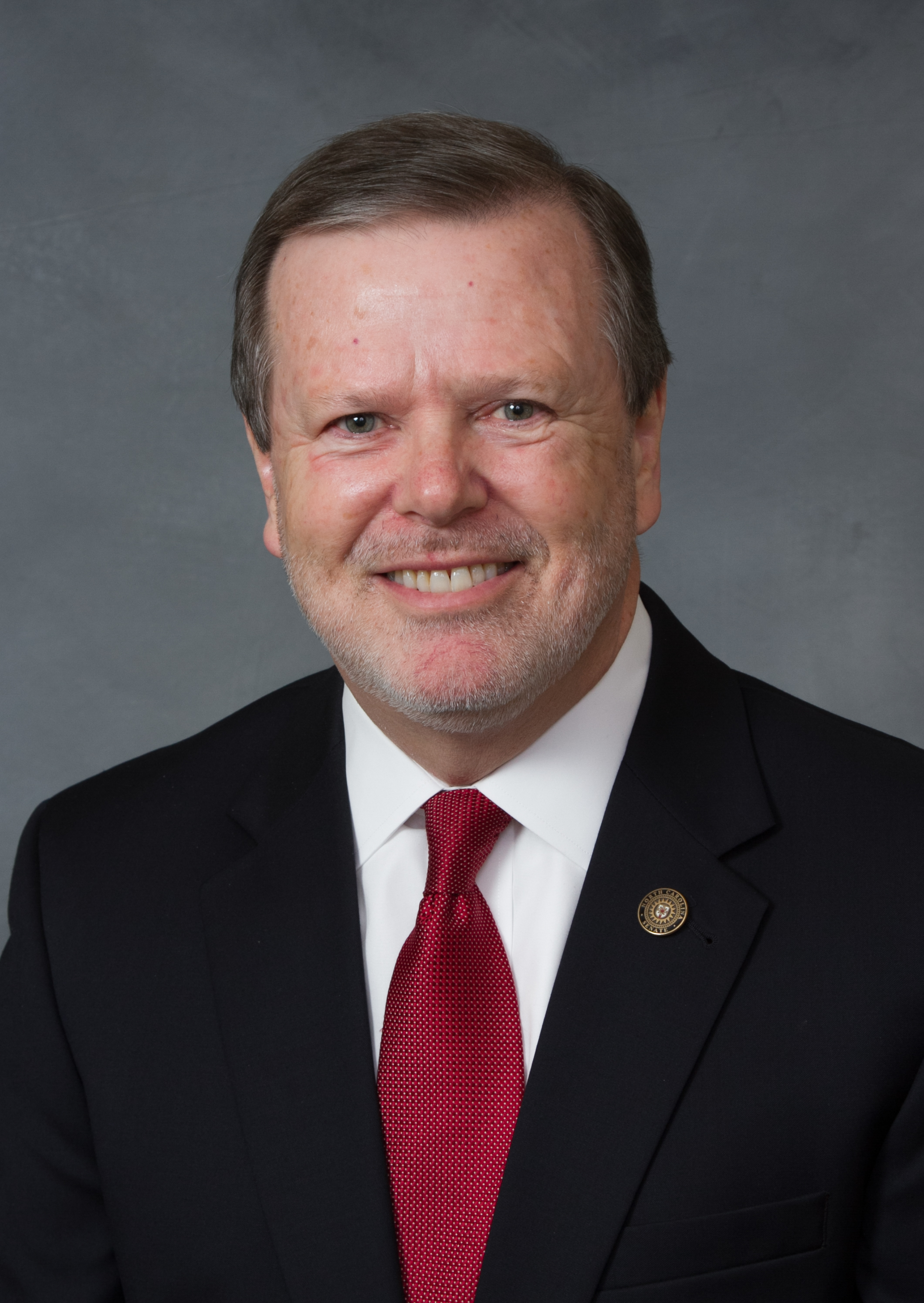
President Pro Tem, Phil Berger, Rep.

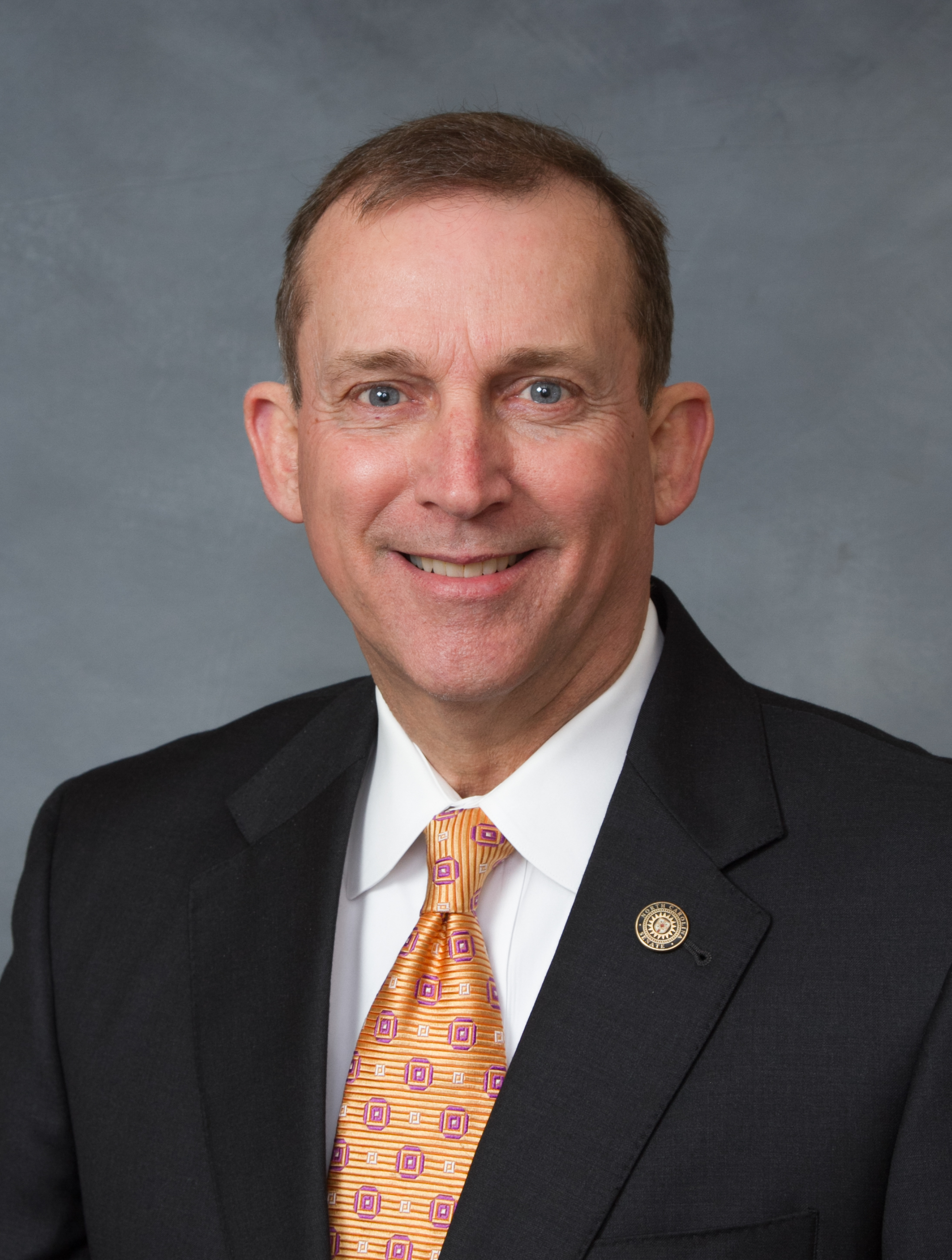
Majority Leader Harry Brown

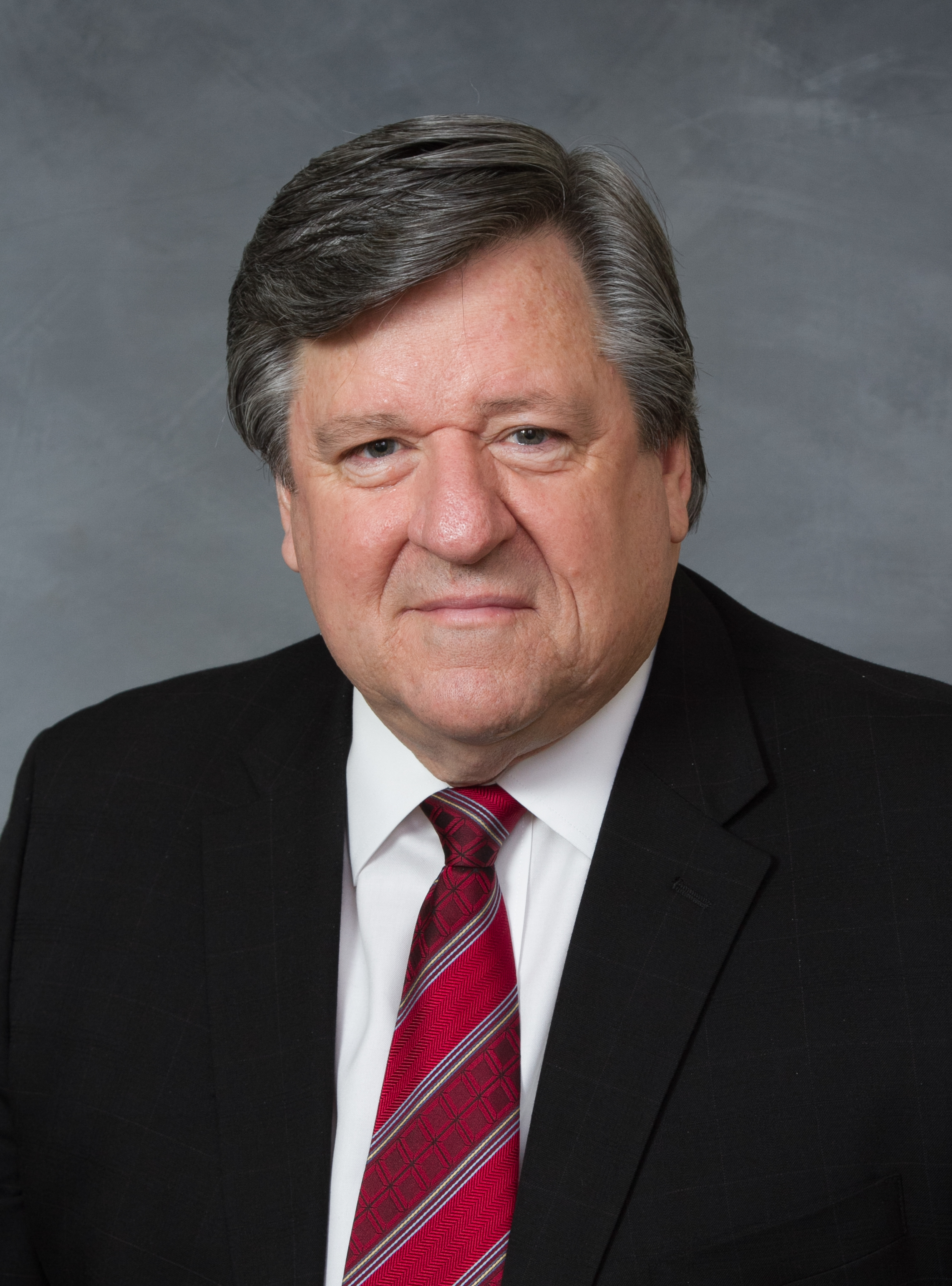
Minority Leader Martin Nesbitt, Dem.

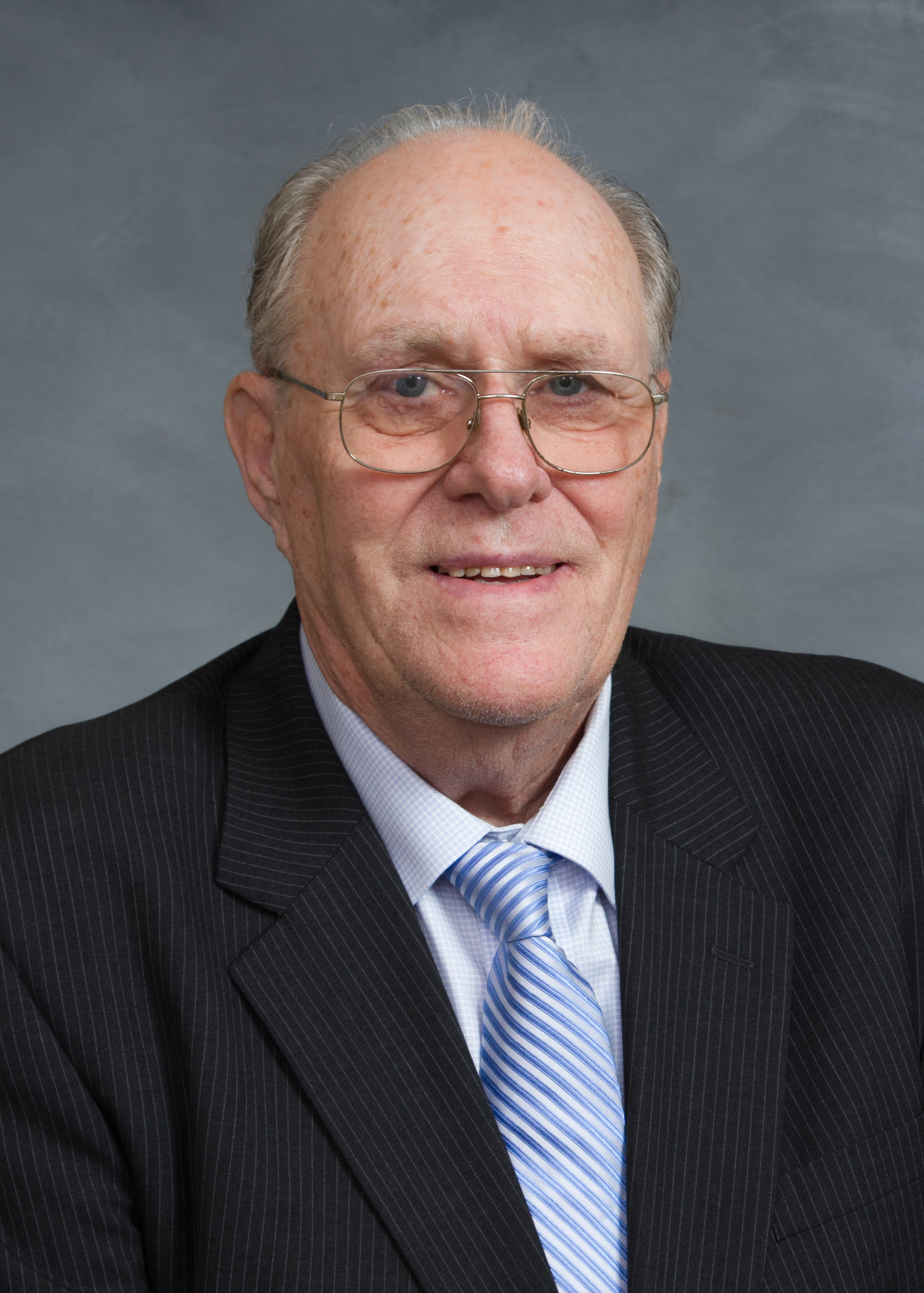
Majority Whip Jerry W. Tillman

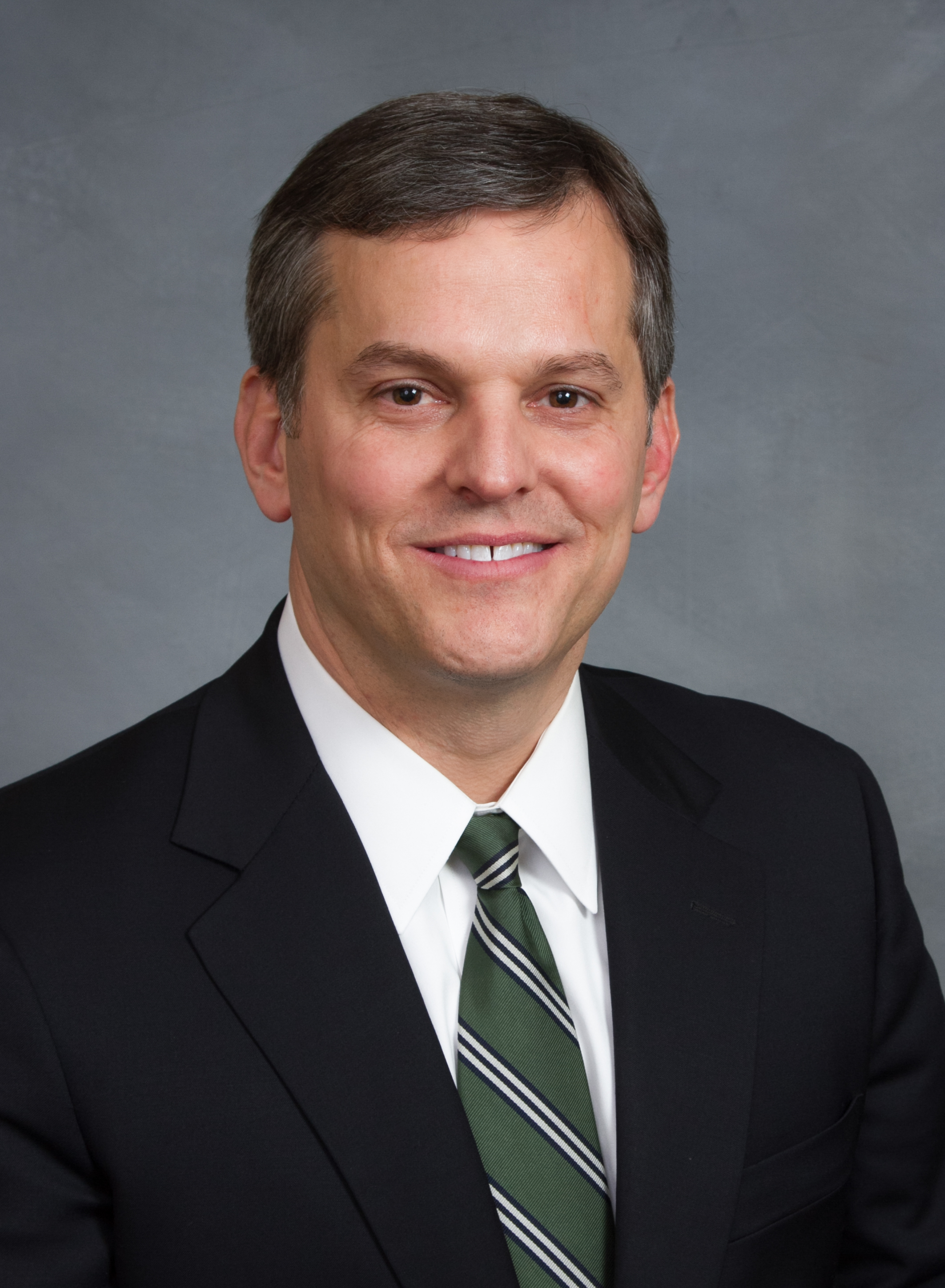
Minority Whip Josh Stein

Senate leadership included the following

North Carolina Senate officers
Position	Name	Party
Deputy President Pro Tempore	James Forrester (until his death on October 31, 2011); Harris Blake (from January 4, 2012)	Republican
Majority Leader	Harry Brown	Republican
Majority Whip	Jerry W. Tillman	Republican
Minority Leader	Martin Nesbitt	Democratic
Deputy Minority Leaders	Linda Garrou	Democratic
Deputy Minority Leaders	Floyd McKissick Jr.	Democratic
Deputy Minority Leaders	Don Vaughan	Democratic
Minority Whip	Josh Stein	Democratic

=== Senate members ===
The following table lists the Senators, their party, city of residence, and the district and counties they represented:

District	Senator	Party	Residence	Counties represented	First elected
1st	Marc Basnight	Democratic	Manteo	Beaufort, Camden, Currituck, Dare, Hyde, Pasquotank, Tyrrell, Washington	1984
1st	Stan White	Democratic	Nags Head	Beaufort, Camden, Currituck, Dare, Hyde, Pasquotank, Tyrrell, Washington	2011↑
2nd	Jean Preston	Republican	Emerald Isle	Carteret, Craven, Pamlico	2006
3rd	Clark Jenkins	Democratic	Tarboro	Edgecombe, Martin, Pitt	2002
4th	Edward Jones	Democratic	Enfield	Bertie, Chowan, Gates, Halifax, Hertford, Northampton, Perquimans	2007↑
5th	Louis M. Pate Jr.	Republican	Mount Olive	Greene, Pitt, Wayne	2010
6th	Harry Brown	Republican	Jacksonville	Jones, Onslow	2004
7th	Doug Berger	Democratic	Youngsville	Franklin, Granville, Vance, Warren	2004
8th	Bill Rabon	Republican	Winnabow	Brunswick, Columbus, Pender	2010
9th	Thom Goolsby	Republican	Wilmington	New Hanover	2010
10th	Brent Jackson	Republican	Autryville	Duplin, Lenoir, Samson	2010
11th	Buck Newton	Republican	Wilson	Nash, Wilson	2010
12th	David Rouzer	Republican	Benson	Johnston, Wayne	2008
13th	Michael P. Walters	Democratic	Fairmont	Hoke, Robeson	2009↑
14th	Dan Blue	Democratic	Raleigh	Wake	2009↑
15th	Neal Hunt	Republican	Raleigh	Wake	2004
16th	Josh Stein	Democratic	Raleigh	Wake	2008
17th	Richard Y. Stevens until Sept. 2012 (resignation)	Republican	Cary	Wake	2002
17th	Tamara P. Barringer	Republican	Cary	Wake	2012↑
18th	Bob Atwater	Democratic	Chapel Hill	Chatham, Durham, Lee	2004
19th	Wesley Meredith	Republican	Fayetteville	Bladen, Cumberland	2010
20th	Floyd McKissick Jr.	Democratic	Durham	Durham	2007↑
21st	Eric L. Mansfield	Democratic	Fayetteville	Cumberland	2010
22nd	Harris Blake	Republican	Pinehurst	Harnett, Moore	2002
23rd	Eleanor Kinnaird	Democratic	Carrboro	Orange, Person	1996
24th	Rick Gunn	Republican	Burlington	Alamance, Caswell	2010
25th	William R. Purcell	Democratic	Laurinburg	Anson, Richmond, Scotland, Stanly	1997↑
26th	Phil Berger	Republican	Eden	Guilford, Rockingham	2000
27th	Don Vaughan	Democratic	Greensboro	Guilford	2008
28th	Gladys A. Robinson	Democratic	Greensboro	Guilford	2010
29th	Jerry W. Tillman	Republican	Archdale	Montgomery, Randolph	2002
30th	Don W. East until Oct. 22, 2012 (death)	Republican	Pilot Mountain	Alleghany, Stokes, Surry, Yadkin	2004
31st	Peter S. Brunstetter	Republican	Lewisville	Forsyth	2006
32nd	Linda Garrou	Democratic	Winston-Salem	Forsyth	1998
33rd	Stan Bingham	Republican	Denton	Davidson, Guilford	2000
34th	Andrew C. Brock	Republican	Mocksville	Davie, Rowan	2002
35th	Tommy Tucker	Republican	Waxhaw	Mecklenburg, Union	2010
36th	Fletcher L. Hartsell Jr.	Republican	Concord	Cabarrus, Iredell	1990
37th	Dan Clodfelter	Democratic	Charlotte	Mecklenburg	1998
38th	Charlie Dannelly	Democratic	Charlotte	Mecklenburg	1994
39th	Bob Rucho	Republican	Matthews	Mecklenburg	2008↑
40th	Malcolm Graham	Democratic	Charlotte	Mecklenburg	2004
41st	James Forrester until October 31, 2011 (death)	Republican	Stanley	Gaston, Iredell, Lincoln	1990
41st	Chris Carney from December 20, 2011	Republican	Mooresville	Gaston, Iredell, Lincoln	2011↑
42nd	Austin M. Allran	Republican	Hickory	Catawba, Iredell	1986
43rd	Kathy Harrington	Republican	Gastonia	Gaston	2010
44th	Warren Daniel	Republican	Morganton	Burke, Caldwell	2010
45th	Dan Soucek	Republican	Boone	Alexander, Ashe, Watauga, Wilkes	2010
46th	Debbie Clary until January 2012 (resignation)	Republican	Shelby	Cleveland, Rutherford	2008
46th	Wes Westmoreland from January 2012	Republican	Shelby	Cleveland, Rutherford	2012↑
47th	Ralph Hise	Republican	Spruce Pine	Avery, Haywood, Madison, McDowell, Mitchell, Yancey	2010
48th	Tom Apodaca	Republican	Hendersonville	Buncombe, Henderson, Polk	2002
49th	Martin Nesbitt	Democratic	Asheville	Buncombe	2004↑
50th	Jim Davis	Republican	Franklin	Cherokee, Clay, Graham, Haywood, Jackson, Macon, Swain, Transylvania	2010

- ↑: Member was originally appointed to fill the remainder of an unexpired term.

== See also ==
- List of North Carolina state legislatures
