= North Carolina Senate Bill 2 (2015) =

2015 North Carolina law

Senate Bill 2, officially called An act to allow magistrates, assistant registers of deeds, and deputy registers of deeds to recuse themselves from performing duties related to marriage ceremonies due to sincerely held religious objection., is a 2015 North Carolina anti-LGBT law that allows for an exemption for state magistrates, assistant register of deeds, or deputy register of deeds who object to participating to issuing marriage licenses for marriages they object to "based upon any sincerely held religious objection."

== Background ==
On October 10, 2014, U.S. District Court judge Max O. Cogburn, Jr. ruled in the case of General Synod of the United Church of Christ v. Cooper that the state's denial of marriage rights to same-sex couples was unconstitutional, thus legalizing same-sex marriage in North Carolina.

== Legislative history ==
On February 25, 2015, the North Carolina Senate passed, with 32 ayes, 16 noes, and 2 absent, Senate Bill 2. On May 28, 2015, the North Carolina House of Representatives passed, with 67 ayes, 43 noes, and 10 absent, SB 2. On that same day, Governor Pat McCrory vetoed SB 2. On June 1, 2015, the North Carolina Senate voted, with 32 ayes, 16 noes, and 2 absent, in favor of overriding the governor's veto of Senate Bill 2. On June 11, 2015, the North Carolina House of Representatives voted, with 69 ayes, 41 noes, and 10 absent, in favor of overriding the governor's veto of Senate Bill 2 and the law went into effect as Chapter Session Law 2015-75.

== See also ==
- LGBT rights in North Carolina
- Same-sex marriage in North Carolina
