= North Carolina General Assembly of 2017–18 =

Legislative term in US state of North Carolina

153rd North Carolina General Assembly 2017–18
←	2015–16	2019–20	→
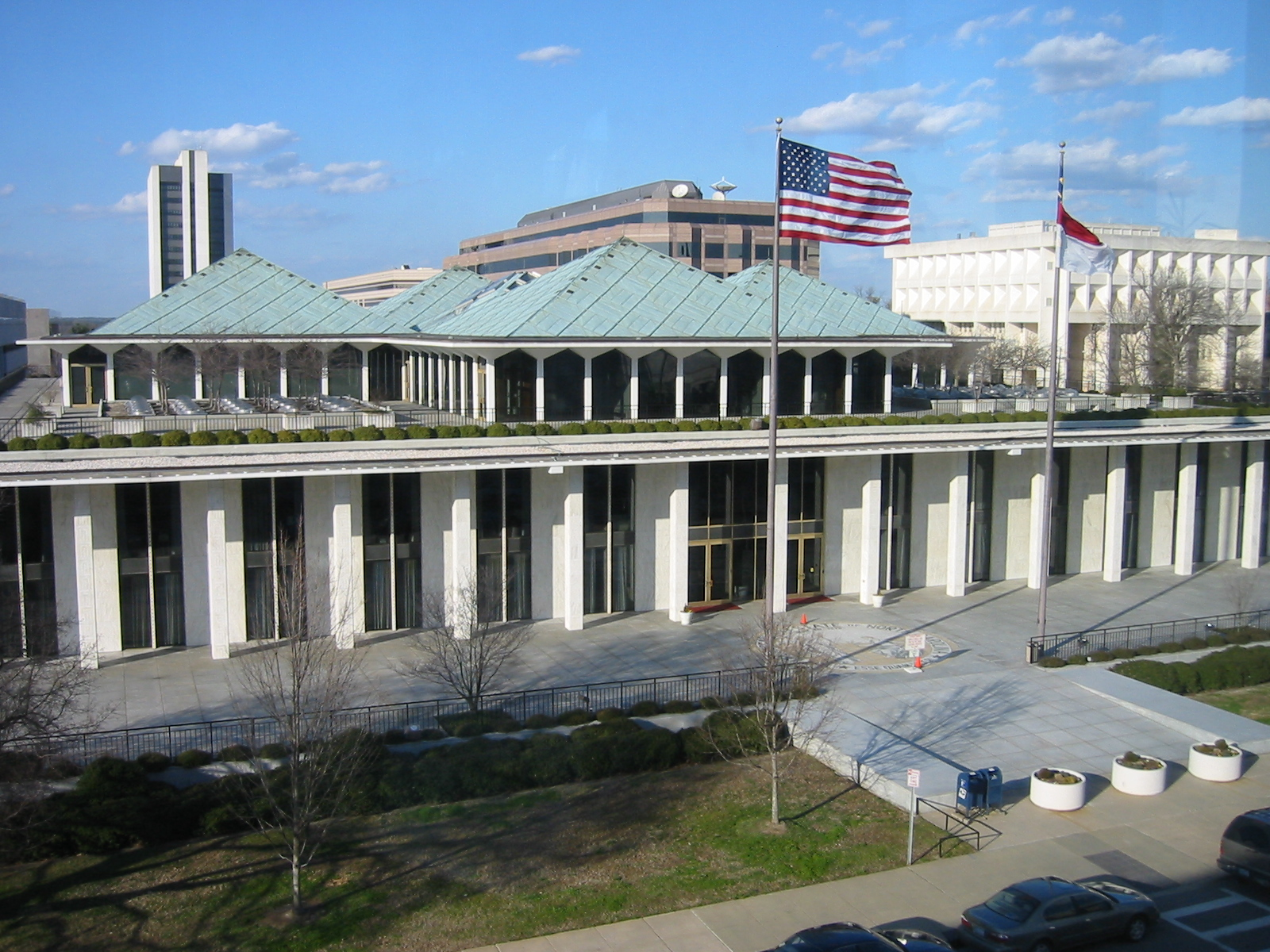
- North Carolina Legislative Building

Overview
- Legislative body: North Carolina General Assembly
- Jurisdiction: North Carolina, United States
- Meeting place: State Legislative Building in Raleigh
- Term: 2017–18
- Website: House Senate

North Carolina Senate
- Members: 50 senators
- President pro tempore: Phil Berger Rep.
- Majority Leader: Harry Brown Rep.
- Minority Leader: Dan Blue Dem.
- Party control: Republican Party

North Carolina House of Representatives
- Members: 120 representatives
- Speaker: Tim Moore Rep.
- Majority Leader: John R. Bell IV Rep
- Minority Leader: Darren Jackson Dem.
- Party control: Republican Party

The North Carolina General Assembly 2017–18 was the 153rd State legislature that first convened on January 11, 2017. Members of the North Carolina Senate and the North Carolina House of Representatives were elected on November 7, 2016. This legislature was in session from January 11, 2017, through June 30, 2017. Additional sessions were held on August 3, August 18–25, August 28–31, and October 4–17 in 2017. The 2018 session was held from January 10, 2018, through July 4, 2018.

== Legislation ==
This legislature created 360 session laws (146 in 2018, 214 in 2017). Some of the session laws included an act to amend the Constitution of North Carolina to require photo identification in order to vote (H1092), an act to amend the constitution to establish a bipartisan board of ethics and elections enforcement (H4), and several acts dealing with Hurricane Florence recovery.

== House of Representatives ==
=== House leadership ===
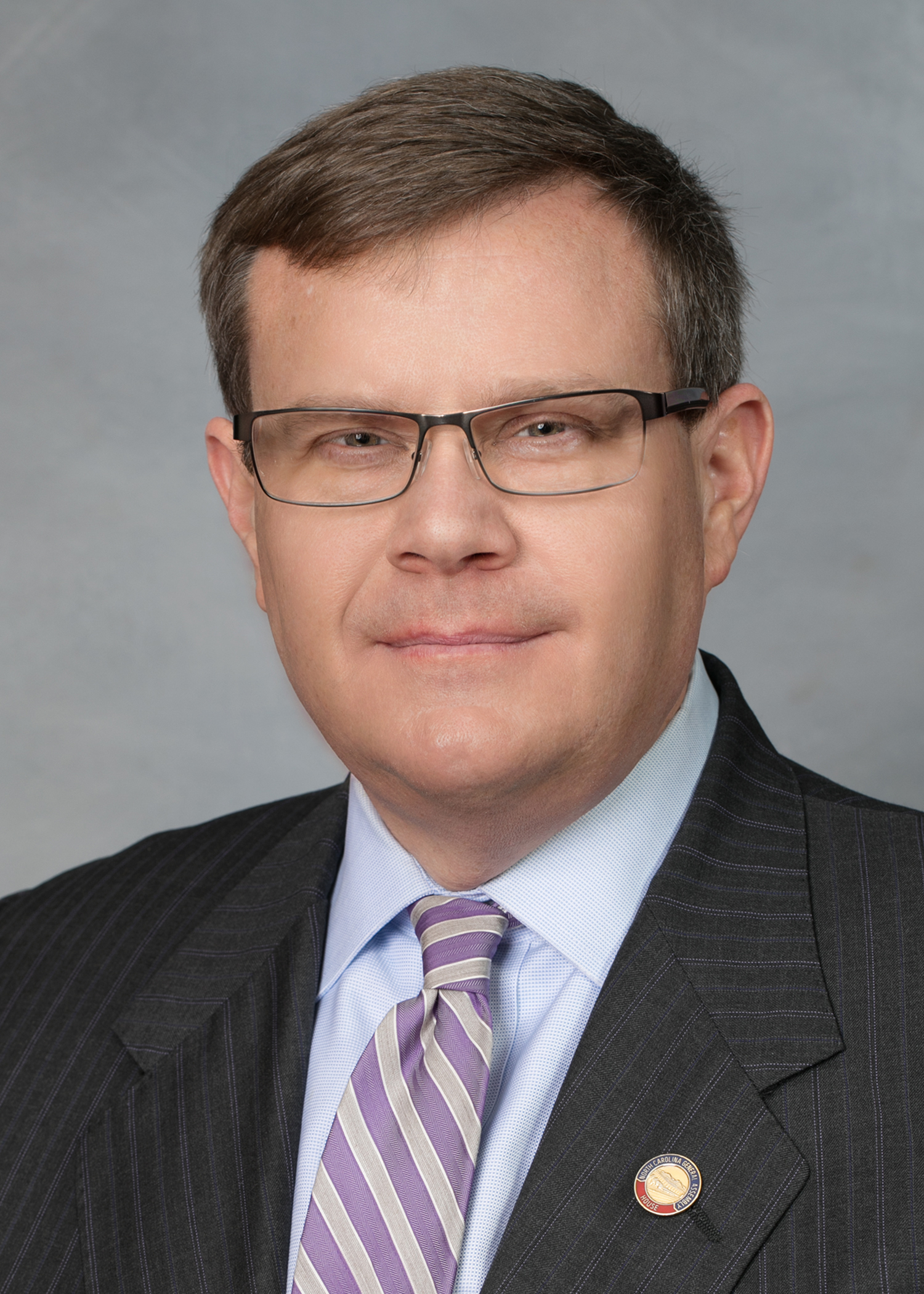
Speaker Tim Moore

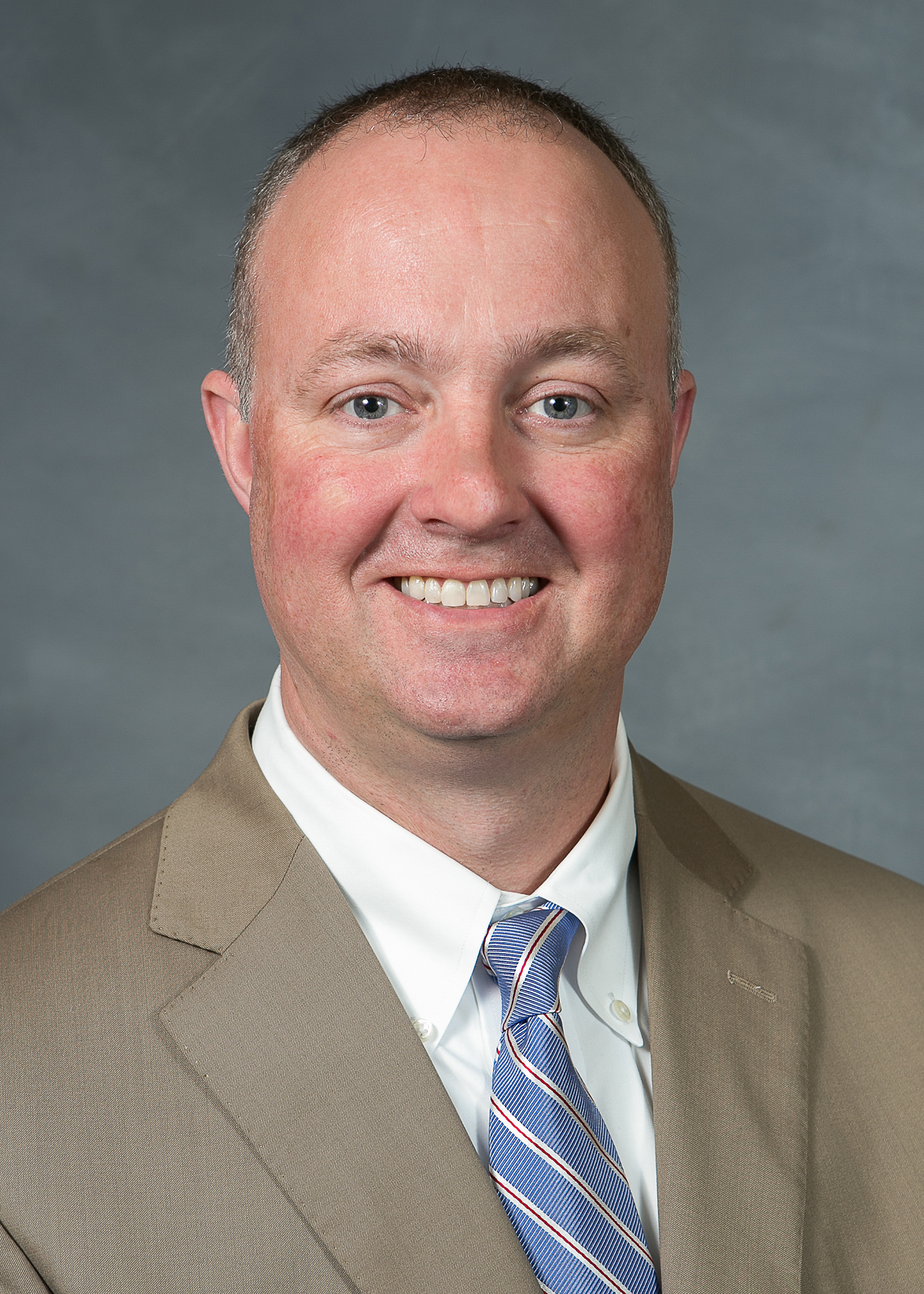
Minority Leader Darren G. Jackson

The General Assembly House of Representatives consisted of representatives from the 120 State districts in North Carolina.

North Carolina House officers
Position	Name	Party
Speaker Pro Tempore	Sarah Stevens	Republican
Majority Leader	John R. Bell IV	Republican
Deputy Majority Leader	Brenden H. Jones	Republican
Majority Whip	Jon Hardister	Republican
Deputy Minority Leader	Robert T. Reives II	Democratic
Minority Whips	Cynthia Ball	Democratic
Minority Whips	Garland E. Pierce	Democratic
Minority Whips	Deb Butler	Democratic
Minority Whips	Carla Cunningham	Democratic
Minority Whips	Amos Quick	Democratic

=== House members ===
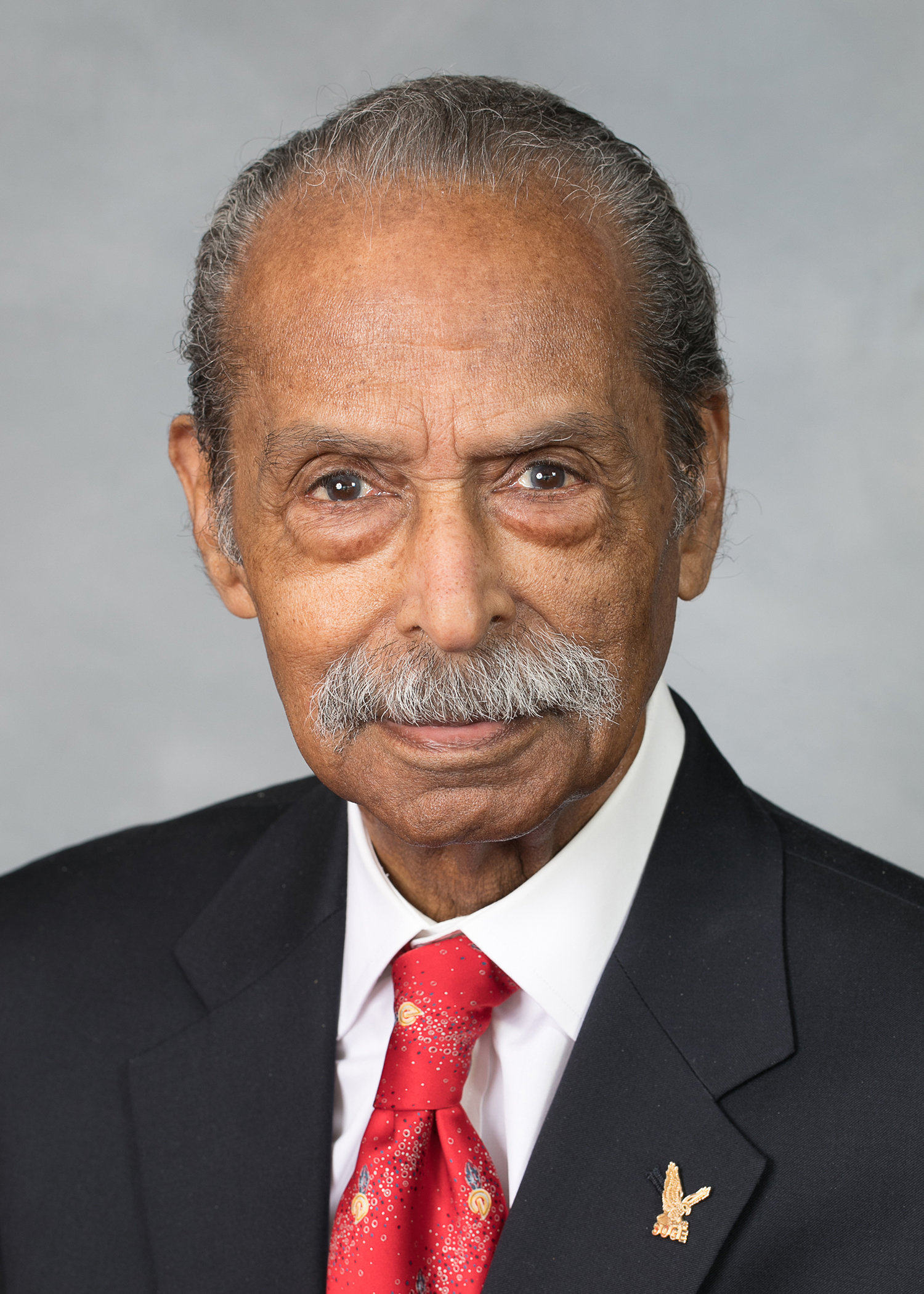
Rep. Henry Michaux

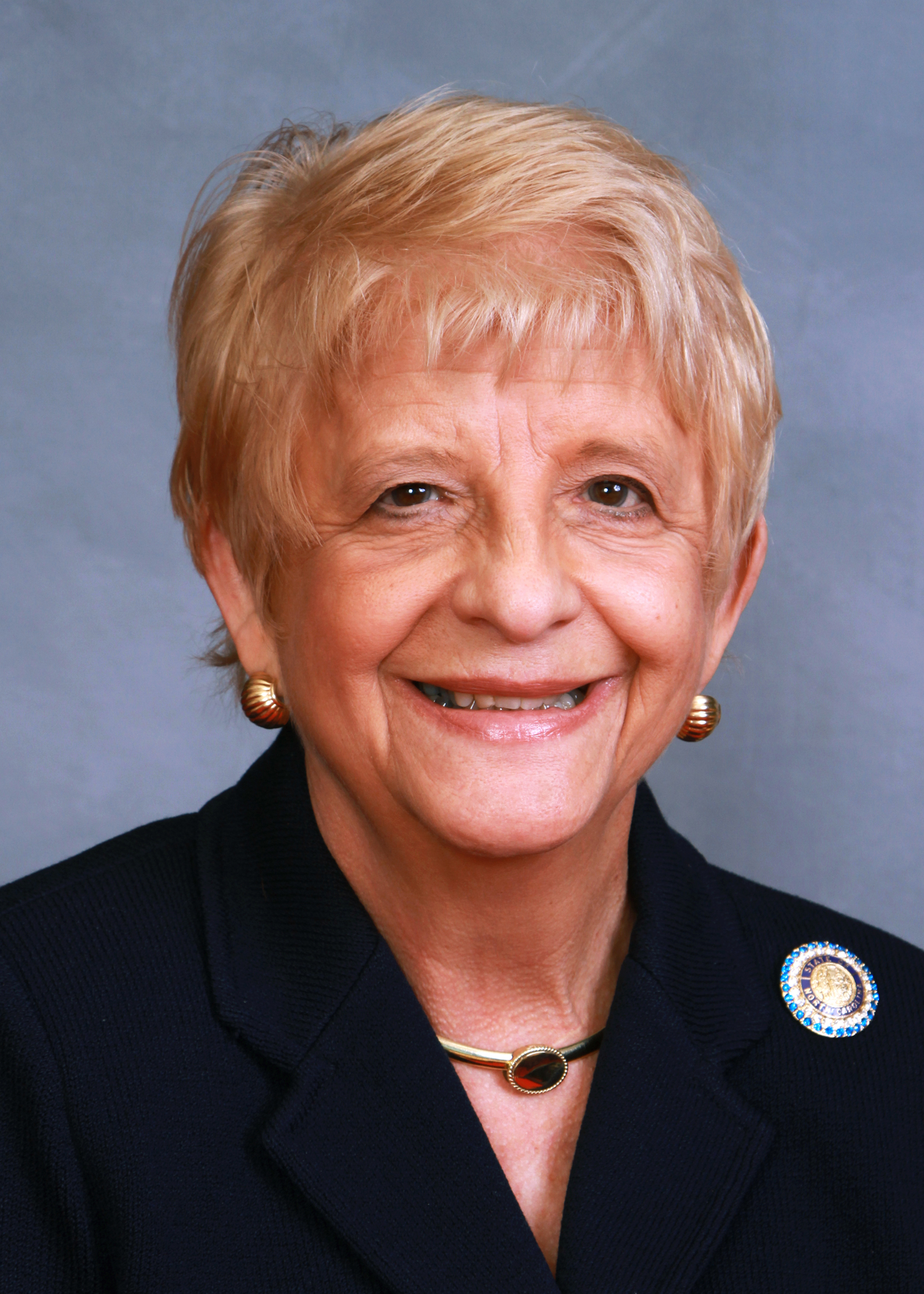
Rep. Julia Howard

The 120 members of the State House of Representatives for 2017–2018 included 75 Republicans, 45 Democrats, 30 women, 24 African Americans, one Native American (Charles Graham), and 25 new members.

District	Representative	Party	Residence	Counties represented	First elected
1st	Bob Steinburg	Republican	Edenton	Camden, Chowan, Currituck, Pasquotank, Perquimans, Tyrrell	2012
2nd	Larry Yarborough	Republican	Roxboro	Granville, Person	2014
3rd	Michael Speciale	Republican	New Bern	Beaufort, Craven, Pamlico	2012
4th	Jimmy Dixon	Republican	Warsaw	Duplin, Wayne	2010
5th	Howard Hunter III	Democratic	Ahoskie	Bertie, Gates, Hertford, Pasquotank	2014
6th	Beverly Boswell	Republican	Kill Devil Hills	Beaufort, Dare, Hyde, Washington	2016
7th	Bobbie Richardson	Democratic	Louisburg	Franklin, Nash	2012
8th	Susan Martin	Republican	Wilson	Pitt, Wilson	2012
9th	Greg Murphy	Republican	Greenville	Pitt	2015↑
10th	John Bell	Republican	Goldsboro	Craven, Greene, Lenoir, Wayne	2012
11th	Duane Hall	Democratic	Raleigh	Wake	2012
12th	George Graham	Democratic	Kinston	Craven, Greene, Lenoir	2012
13th	Pat McElraft	Republican	Emerald Isle	Carteret, Jones	2006
14th	George Cleveland	Republican	Jacksonville	Onslow	2004
15th	Phil Shepard	Republican	Jacksonville	Onslow	2010
16th	Chris Millis (Note: Resigned 9/15/17.)	Republican	Hampstead	Onslow, Pender	2012
16th	Bob Muller (Note: Bob Muller appointed 9/26/17.)	Republican	Hampstead	Onslow, Pender	2017↑
17th	Frank Iler	Republican	Oak Island	Brunswick	2009↑
18th	Susi Hamilton (Note: Resigned 1/26/17.)	Democratic	Wilmington	Brunswick, New Hanover	2010
18th	Deb Butler (Note: Appointed 2/6/17.)	Democratic	Wilmington	Brunswick, New Hanover	2017↑
19th	Ted Davis Jr.	Republican	Wilmington	New Hanover	2012↑
20th	Holly Grange	Republican	Wilmington	New Hanover	2016↑
21st	Larry Bell	Democratic	Clinton	Duplin, Sampson, Wayne	2000
22nd	William Brisson (Note: Changed party affiliation to Republican 10/25/17.)	Republican	Dublin	Bladen, Johnston, Sampson	2006
23rd	Shelly Willingham	Democratic	Rocky Mount	Edgecombe, Martin	2014
24th	Jean Farmer-Butterfield	Democratic	Wilson	Pitt, Wilson	2002
25th	Jeff Collins	Republican	Rocky Mount	Franklin, Nash	2010
26th	Donna McDowell White	Republican	Clayton	Johnston	2016
27th	Michael Wray	Democratic	Gaston	Halifax, Northampton	2004
28th	Larry Strickland	Republican	Pine Level	Johnston	2016
29th	Larry Hall (Note: Resigned 1/16/17.)	Democratic	Durham	Durham	2006↑
29th	MaryAnn Black (Note: Appointed 2/15/17.)	Democratic	Durham	Durham	2017↑
30th	Philip Lehman (Note: Resigned 3/30/17.)	Democratic	Durham	Durham	2016↑
30th	Marcia Morey (Note: Appointed 4/5/17.)	Democratic	Durham	Durham	2017↑
31st	Mickey Michaux	Democratic	Durham	Durham	1984
32nd	Terry Garrison	Democratic	Henderson	Granville, Vance, Warren	2016
33rd	Rosa Gill	Democratic	Raleigh	Wake	2009↑
34th	Grier Martin	Democratic	Raleigh	Wake	2013↑
35th	Chris Malone	Republican	Wake Forest	Wake	2012
36th	Nelson Dollar	Republican	Cary	Wake	2004
37th	Linda Hunt Williams (Note: Resigned 8/31/18.)	Republican	Holly Springs	Wake	2016
37th	John Adcock (Note: Appointed 9/21/18.)	Republican	Holly Springs	Wake	2018↑
38th	Yvonne Lewis Holley	Democratic	Raleigh	Wake	2012
39th	Darren Jackson	Democratic	Raleigh	Wake	2009↑
40th	Joe John	Democratic	Raleigh	Wake	2016
41st	Gale Adcock	Democratic	Cary	Wake	2014
42nd	Marvin Lucas	Democratic	Spring Lake	Cumberland	2000
43rd	Elmer Floyd	Democratic	Fayetteville	Cumberland	2008
44th	Billy Richardson	Democratic	Fayetteville	Cumberland	2015↑
45th	John Szoka	Republican	Fayetteville	Cumberland	2012
46th	Brenden Jones	Republican	Tabor City	Bladen, Columbus, Robeson	2016
47th	Charles Graham	Democratic	Lumberton	Robeson	2010
48th	Garland Pierce	Democratic	Wagram	Hoke, Richmond, Robeson, Scotland	2004
49th	Cynthia Ball	Democratic	Raleigh	Wake	2016
50th	Graig Meyer	Democratic	Hillsborough	Durham, Orange	2013↑
51st	John Sauls	Republican	Sanford	Harnett, Lee	2016
52nd	Jamie Boles	Republican	Southern Pines	Moore	2008
53rd	David Lewis	Republican	Dunn	Harnett	2002
54th	Robert Reives	Democratic	Goldston	Chatham, Lee	2014↑
55th	Mark Brody	Republican	Monroe	Anson, Union	2012
56th	Verla Insko	Democratic	Chapel Hill	Orange	1996
57th	Pricey Harrison	Democratic	Greensboro	Guilford	2004
58th	Amos Quick	Democratic	Greensboro	Guilford	2016
59th	Jon Hardister	Republican	Whitsett	Guilford	2012
60th	Cecil Brockman	Democratic	High Point	Guilford	2014
61st	John Faircloth	Republican	High Point	Guilford	2010
62nd	John Blust	Republican	Greensboro	Guilford	2000
63rd	Stephen Ross	Republican	Burlington	Alamance	2012
64th	Dennis Riddell	Republican	Snow Camp	Alamance	2012
65th	Bert Jones	Republican	Reidsville	Caswell, Rockingham	2010
66th	Ken Goodman	Democratic	Rockingham	Hoke, Montgomery, Richmond, Robeson, Scotland	2010
67th	Justin Burr	Republican	Albemarle	Montgomery, Stanly	2008
68th	Craig Horn	Republican	Matthews	Union	2010
69th	Dean Arp	Republican	Monroe	Union	2012
70th	Pat Hurley	Republican	Asheboro	Randolph	2006
71st	Evelyn Terry	Democratic	Winston-Salem	Forsyth	2012
72nd	Ed Hanes (Note: Resigned August 7, 2018.)	Democratic	Winston-Salem	Forsyth	2012
72nd	Derwin Montgomery (Note: Appointed August 15, 2018.Winston-Salem Journal)	Democratic	Winston-Salem	Forsyth	2018↑
73rd	Lee Zachary	Republican	Yadkinville	Alexander, Wilkes, Yadkin	2014
74th	Debra Conrad	Republican	Winston-Salem	Forsyth	2012
75th	Donny Lambeth	Republican	Winston-Salem	Forsyth	2012
76th	Carl Ford	Republican	China Grove	Cabarrus, Rowan	2012
77th	Harry Warren	Republican	Salisbury	Rowan	2010
78th	Allen McNeill	Republican	Asheboro	Moore, Randolph	2012↑
79th	Julia C. Howard	Republican	Mocksville	Davie, Forsyth	1988
80th	Sam Watford	Republican	Thomasville	Davidson	2014
81st	Larry Potts	Republican	Lexington	Davidson	2016
82nd	Larry Pittman	Republican	Concord	Cabarrus	2011↑
83rd	Linda Johnson	Republican	Kannapolis	Cabarrus	2000
84th	Rena Turner	Republican	Olin	Iredell	2012
85th	Josh Dobson	Republican	Nebo	Avery, McDowell, Mitchell	2013↑
86th	Hugh Blackwell	Republican	Valdese	Burke	2008
87th	Destin Hall	Republican	Lenoir	Caldwell	2016
88th	Mary Belk	Democratic	Charlotte	Mecklenburg	2016
89th	Mitchell Setzer	Republican	Catawba	Catawba	1998
90th	Sarah Stevens	Republican	Mt. Airy	Surry, Wilkes	2008
91st	Kyle Hall	Republican	King	Rockingham, Stokes	2015↑
92nd	Chaz Beasley	Democratic	Charlotte	Mecklenburg	2016
93rd	Jonathan Jordan	Republican	Jefferson	Ashe, Watauga	2010
94th	Jeffrey Elmore	Republican	North Wilkesboro	Alleghany, Wilkes	2012
95th	John Fraley	Republican	Troutman	Iredell	2014
96th	Jay Adams	Republican	Hickory	Catawba	2014
97th	Jason Saine	Republican	Lincolnton	Lincoln	2011↑
98th	John Bradford	Republican	Cornelius	Mecklenburg	2014
99th	Rodney Moore	Democratic	Charlotte	Mecklenburg	2010
100th	John Autry	Democratic	Charlotte	Mecklenburg	2016
101st	Beverly Earle	Democratic	Charlotte	Mecklenburg	1994
102nd	Becky Carney	Democratic	Charlotte	Mecklenburg	2002
103rd	Bill Brawley	Republican	Matthews	Mecklenburg	2010
104th	Andy Dulin	Republican	Charlotte	Mecklenburg	2016
105th	Scott Stone	Republican	Charlotte	Mecklenburg	2016↑
106th	Carla Cunningham	Democratic	Charlotte	Mecklenburg	2012
107th	Kelly Alexander	Democratic	Charlotte	Mecklenburg	2009↑
108th	John Torbett	Republican	Stanley	Gaston	2010
109th	Dana Bumgardner	Republican	Gastonia	Gaston	2012
110th	Kelly Hastings	Republican	Cherryville	Cleveland, Gaston	2010
111th	Tim Moore	Republican	Kings Mountain	Cleveland	2002
112th	David Rogers	Republican	Rutherfordton	Burke, Rutherford	2016↑
113th	Cody Henson	Republican	Brevard	Henderson, Polk, Transylvania	2016
114th	Susan Fisher	Democratic	Asheville	Buncombe	2004↑
115th	John Ager	Democratic	Fairview	Buncombe	2014
116th	Brian Turner	Democratic	Asheville	Buncombe	2014
117th	Chuck McGrady	Republican	Hendersonville	Henderson	2010
118th	Michele Presnell	Republican	Burnsville	Haywood, Madison, Yancey	2012
119th	Mike Clampitt	Republican	Bryson City	Haywood, Jackson, Swain	2016
120th	Kevin Corbin	Republican	Franklin	Cherokee, Clay, Graham, Macon	2016

== Senate ==
=== Senate leadership ===
The Senate leadership is as follows, as was shown on the North Carolina Legislature web page in 2017.

North Carolina Senate officers
Position	Name	Party
President Pro Tempore	Phil Berger	Republican
Deputy President Pro Tempore	Louis M. Pate Jr.	Republican
Majority Leader	Harry Brown	Republican
Majority Whip	Jerry W. Tillman	Republican
Majority Whip	Wesley Meredith	Republican
Majority Caucus Secretary	Vacant	Republican
Joint Majority Caucus Leader	Norman W. Sanderson	Republican
Floyd McKissick Jr.	Democratic	
Gladys A. Robinson	Democratic	
Minority Whip	Terry Van Duyn	Democratic
Minority Caucus Secretary	Ben Clark	Democratic
Minority Caucus Co-Chairs	Vacant	Democratic
Minority Caucus Co-Chairs	Vacant	Democratic

=== Membership ===
District	Senator	Party	Residence	Counties represented	First elected
1st	Bill Cook	Republican	Chocowinity	Beaufort, Camden, Currituck, Dare, Gates, Hyde, Pasquotank, Perquimans	2012
2nd	Norman W. Sanderson	Republican	Minnesott Beach	Carteret, Craven, Pamlico	2012
3rd	Erica Smith	Democratic	Henrico	Bertie, Chowan, Edgecombe, Hertford, Martin, Northampton, Tyrrell, Washington	2014
4th	Angela Bryant	Democratic	Rocky Mount	Halifax, Nash, Vance, Warren, Wilson	2013↑
4th	Toby Fitch (Note: Appointed to replace Angela Bryant, who resigned in 2018.)	Democratic	Wilson	Halifax, Nash, Vance, Warren, Wilson	2018↑
5th	Don Davis	Democratic	Greenville	Greene, Lenoir, Pitt, Wayne	2012
6th	Harry Brown	Republican	Jacksonville	Jones, Onslow	2004
7th	Louis M. Pate Jr.	Republican	Mount Olive	Lenoir, Pitt, Wayne	2010
8th	Bill Rabon	Republican	Winnabow	Bladen, Brunswick, New Hanover, Pender	2010
9th	Michael Lee	Republican	Wilmington	New Hanover	2014↑
10th	Brent Jackson	Republican	Autryville	Duplin, Johnston, Samson	2010
11th	Rick Horner	Republican	Bailey	Johnston, Nash, Wilson	2016
12th	Ronald Rabin	Republican	Spring Lake	Harnett, Johnston, Lee	2012
13th	Danny Britt	Republican	Lumberton	Columbus, Robeson	2016
14th	Dan Blue	Democratic	Raleigh	Wake	2009↑
15th	John Alexander	Republican	Raleigh	Wake	2014
16th	Jay Chaudhuri	Democratic	Raleigh	Wake	2016↑
17th	Tamara Barringer	Republican	Cary	Wake	2012↑
18th	Chad Barefoot	Republican	Wake Forest	Franklin, Wake	2012
19th	Wesley Meredith	Republican	Fayetteville	Cumberland	2010
20th	Floyd McKissick Jr.	Democratic	Durham	Durham, Granville	2007↑
21st	Ben Clark	Democratic	Raeford	Cumberland, Hoke	2012
22nd	Mike Woodard	Democratic	Durham	Caswell, Durham, Person	2012
23rd	Valerie Foushee	Democratic	Hillsborough	Chatham, Orange	2013↑
24th	Rick Gunn	Republican	Burlington	Alamance, Randolph	2010
25th	Tom McInnis	Republican	Ellerbe	Anson, Richmond, Rowan, Scotland, Stanly	2014
26th	Phil Berger	Republican	Eden	Guilford, Rockingham	2000
27th	Trudy Wade	Republican	Greensboro	Guilford	2012
28th	Gladys Robinson	Democratic	Greensboro	Guilford	2010
29th	Jerry W. Tillman	Republican	Archdale	Moore, Randolph	2002
30th	Shirley B. Randleman	Republican	Wilkesboro	Stokes, Surry, Wilkes	2012
31st	Joyce Krawiec	Republican	Kernersville	Forsyth, Yadkin	2014↑
32nd	Paul Lowe Jr.	Democratic	Winston-Salem	Forsyth	2015↑
33rd	Cathy Dunn	Republican	Southmont	Davidson, Montgomery	2016
34th	Andrew Brock	Republican	Mocksville	Davie, Iredell, Rowan	2002
34th	Dan Barrett	Republican	Advance	Davie, Iredell, Rowan	2017↑
35th	Tommy Tucker	Republican	Waxhaw	Union	2010
36th	Paul Newton	Republican	Concord	Cabarrus, Union	2016
37th	Jeff Jackson	Democratic	Charlotte	Mecklenburg	2014↑
38th	Joel Ford	Democratic	Charlotte	Mecklenburg	2012
39th	Dan Bishop	Republican	Charlotte	Mecklenburg	2016
40th	Joyce Waddell	Democratic	Charlotte	Mecklenburg	2014
41st	Jeff Tarte	Republican	Cornelius	Mecklenburg	2012
42nd	Andy Wells	Republican	Hickory	Alexander, Catawba	2014
43rd	Kathy Harrington	Republican	Gastonia	Gaston	2010
44th	David Curtis	Republican	Lincolnton	Gaston, Iredell, Lincoln	2012
44th	Vickie Sawyer	Republican	Mooresville	Gaston, Iredell, Lincoln	2018↑
45th	Deanna Ballard	Republican	Blowing Rock	Alleghany, Ashe, Avery, Caldwell, Watauga	2016↑
46th	Warren Daniel	Republican	Morganton	Burke, Cleveland	2010
47th	Ralph Hise	Republican	Spruce Pine	Madison, McDowell, Mitchell, Polk, Rutherford, Yancey	2010
48th	Chuck Edwards	Republican	Flat Rock	Buncombe, Henderson, Transylvania	2016↑
49th	Terry Van Duyn	Democratic	Asheville	Buncombe	2014↑
50th	Jim Davis	Republican	Franklin	Cherokee, Clay, Graham, Haywood, Jackson, Macon, Swain	2010

- ↑: Member was first appointed to office.

== See also ==
- List of North Carolina state legislatures
