= North Carolina General Assembly of 2021–22 =

American state legislature

155th North Carolina General Assembly 2021–22
←	2019–20	2023–24	→
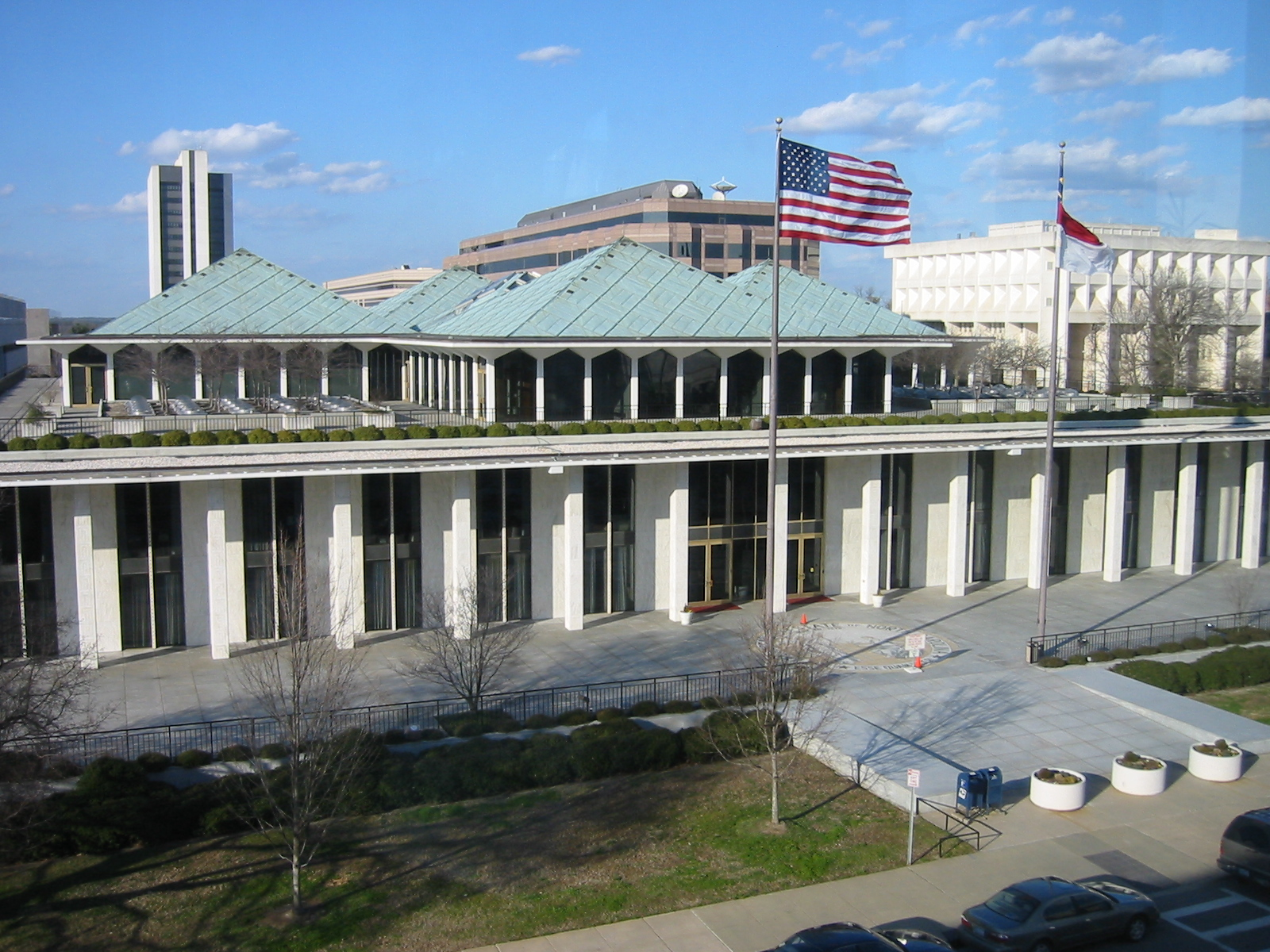
- North Carolina Legislative Building

Overview
- Legislative body: North Carolina General Assembly
- Jurisdiction: North Carolina, United States
- Meeting place: North Carolina State Legislative Building
- Term: 2021–22
- Website: www.ncleg.net

North Carolina Senate
- Members: 50 senators
- President pro tempore of the Senate: Phil Berger
- Majority Leader: Kathy Harrington
- Minority Leader: Dan Blue
- Party control: Republican Party

North Carolina House of Representatives
- Members: 120 representatives
- Speaker of the House: Tim Moore
- Majority Leader: John R. Bell IV
- Minority Leader: Robert T. Reives II

The North Carolina General Assembly 2021–22 session was the state legislature that first convened in January 2021 and concluded in December 2022. Members of the North Carolina Senate and the North Carolina House of Representatives were elected in November 2020.

== House of Representatives ==
The House of Representatives leadership and members are listed below.

=== House leadership ===
North Carolina House officers
Position	Name	Party
Speaker Pro Tempore	Sarah Stevens	Republican
Majority Leader	John R. Bell IV	Republican
Deputy Majority Leader	Brenden Jones	Republican
Majority Whip	Jon Hardister	Republican
Deputy Minority Leader	Gale Adcock	Democratic
Minority Whips	Cynthia Ball	Democratic
Minority Whips	Garland E. Pierce	Democratic
Minority Whips	Deb Butler	Democratic
Minority Whips	Carla Cunningham	Democratic
Minority Whips	Amos Quick	Democratic

=== House members ===
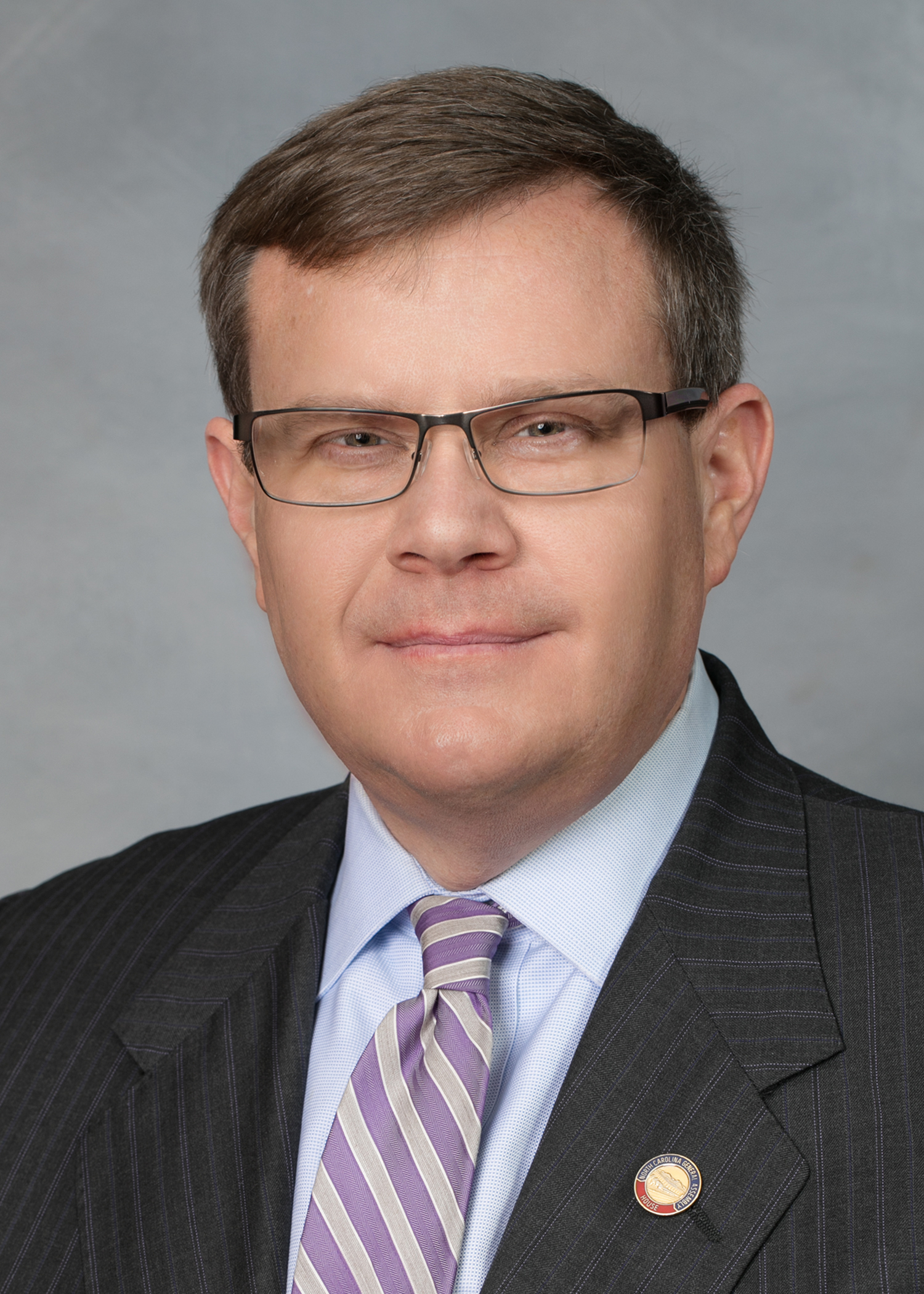
Speaker Tim Moore

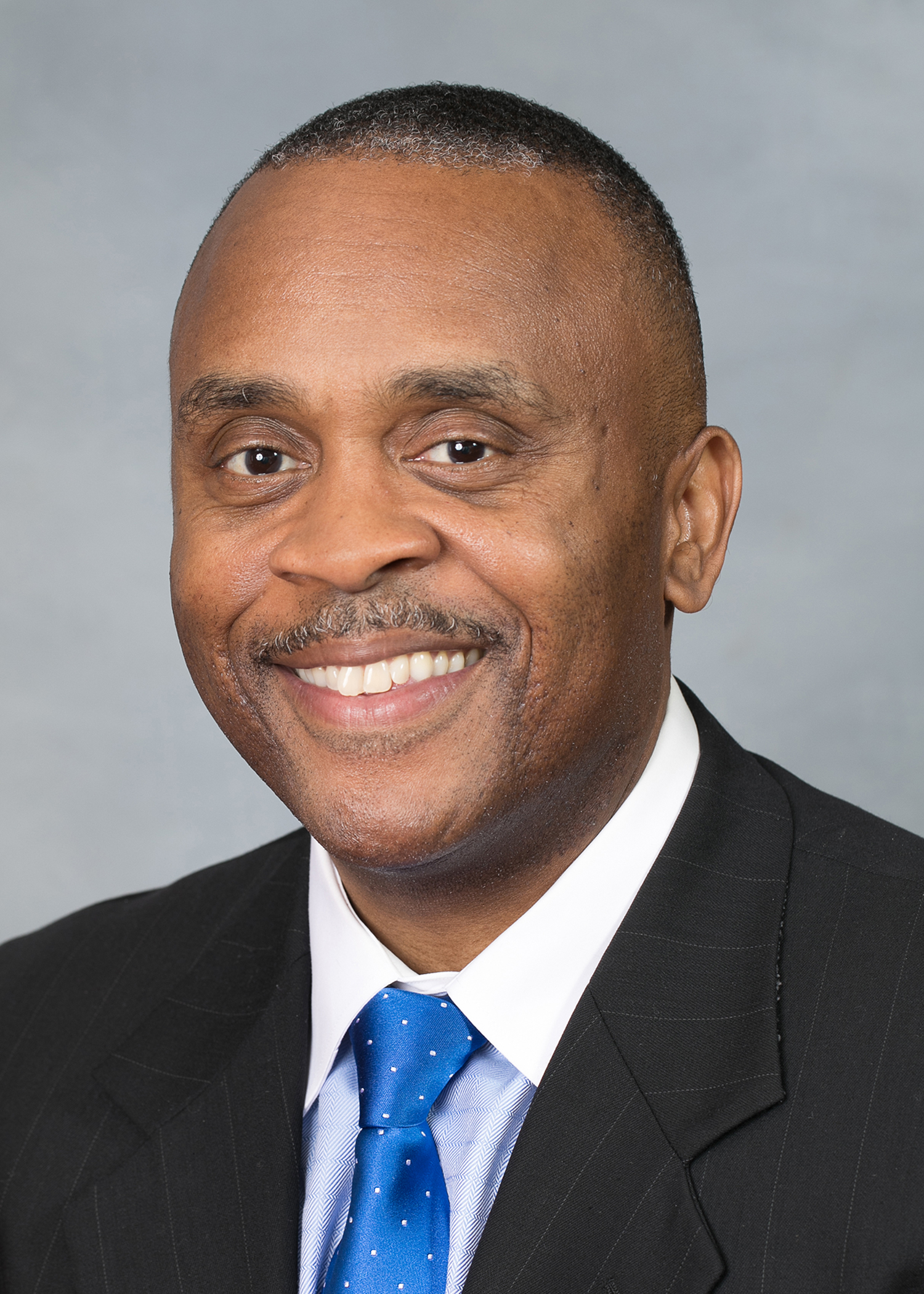
Minority Leader Robert T. Reives II

The following table shows the district, party, counties represented, and date first elected of members of the House of Representatives.

District	Representative	Party	Residence	Counties represented	First elected
1st	Ed Goodwin	Republican	Edenton	Bertie, Camden, Chowan, Perquimans, Tyrrell, Washington	2018
2nd	Larry Yarborough	Republican	Roxboro	Granville, Person	2014
3rd	Steve Tyson	Republican	New Bern	Craven	2020
4th	Jimmy Dixon	Republican	Mount Olive	Duplin, Onslow	2010
5th	Howard Hunter III	Democratic	Ahoskie	Gates, Hertford, Pasquotank	2014
6th	Bobby Hanig (Note: Resigned August 29, 2022.)	Republican	Powells Point	Currituck, Dare, Hyde, Pamlico	2018
6th	Paul O'Neal (Note: Appointed September 19, 2022.)	Republican	Waterlily	Currituck, Dare, Hyde, Pamlico	2022↑
7th	Matthew Winslow	Republican	Youngsville	Franklin, Nash	2020
8th	Kandie Smith	Democratic	Greenville	Pitt	2018
9th	Brian Farkas	Democratic	Greenville	Pitt	2020
10th	John R. Bell IV	Republican	Goldsboro	Greene, Johnston, Wayne	2012
11th	Allison Dahle	Democratic	Raleigh	Wake	2018
12th	Chris Humphrey	Republican	La Grange	Lenoir, Pitt	2018
13th	Pat McElraft	Republican	Emerald Isle	Carteret, Jones	2006
14th	George Cleveland	Republican	Jacksonville	Onslow	2004
15th	Phil Shepard	Republican	Jacksonville	Onslow	2010
16th	Carson Smith	Republican	Hampstead	Columbus, Pender	2018
17th	Frank Iler	Republican	Shallotte	Brunswick	2009↑
18th	Deb Butler	Democratic	Wilmington	New Hanover	2017↑
19th	Charlie Miller	Republican	Southport	Brunswick, New Hanover	2020
20th	Ted Davis Jr.	Republican	Wilmington	New Hanover	2012↑
21st	Raymond Smith Jr.	Democratic	Goldsboro	Sampson, Wayne	2018
22nd	William Brisson	Republican	Dublin	Bladen, Sampson	2006
23rd	Shelly Willingham	Democratic	Rocky Mount	Edgecombe, Martin	2014
24th	Linda Cooper-Suggs	Democratic	Wilson	Wilson	2020↑
25th	James Gailliard	Democratic	Rocky Mount	Nash	2018
26th	Donna McDowell White	Republican	Clayton	Johnston	2016
27th	Michael Wray	Democratic	Gaston	Halifax, Northampton	2004
28th	Larry Strickland	Republican	Pine Level	Harnett, Johnston	2016
29th	Vernetta Alston	Democratic	Durham	Durham	2020↑
30th	Marcia Morey	Democratic	Durham	Durham	2017↑
31st	Zack Forde-Hawkins	Democratic	Durham	Durham	2018
32nd	Terry Garrison	Democratic	Henderson	Granville, Vance, Warren	2016
33rd	Rosa Gill	Democratic	Raleigh	Wake	2009↑
34th	Grier Martin (Note: Resigned July 8, 2022.)	Democratic	Raleigh	Wake	2013↑ (2005–2012)
34th	Jack Nichols (Note: Appointed July 15, 2022.)	Democratic	Raleigh	Wake	2022↑
35th	Terence Everitt	Democratic	Wake Forest	Wake	2018
36th	Julie von Haefen	Democratic	Apex	Wake	2018
37th	Erin Paré	Republican	Holly Springs	Wake	2020
38th	Abe Jones	Democratic	Raleigh	Wake	2020
39th	James Roberson	Democratic	Knightdale	Wake	2021↑
40th	Joe John	Democratic	Raleigh	Wake	2016
41st	Gale Adcock	Democratic	Cary	Wake	2014
42nd	Marvin Lucas	Democratic	Spring Lake	Cumberland	2000
43rd	Diane Wheatley	Republican	Linden	Cumberland	2020
44th	Billy Richardson	Democratic	Fayetteville	Cumberland	2015↑ (1993–1997)
45th	John Szoka	Republican	Fayetteville	Cumberland	2012
46th	Brenden Jones	Republican	Tabor City	Columbus, Robeson	2016
47th	Charles Graham	Democratic	Lumberton	Robeson	2010
48th	Garland Pierce	Democratic	Wagram	Hoke, Scotland	2004
49th	Cynthia Ball	Democratic	Raleigh	Wake	2016
50th	Graig Meyer	Democratic	Hillsborough	Caswell, Orange	2013↑
51st	John Sauls	Republican	Sanford	Harnett, Lee	2016
52nd	Jamie Boles	Republican	Whispering Pines	Moore	2008
53rd	Howard Penny Jr.	Republican	Coats	Harnett	2020↑
54th	Robert Reives	Democratic	Goldston	Chatham, Durham	2014↑
55th	Mark Brody	Republican	Monroe	Anson, Union	2012
56th	Verla Insko (Note: Resigned May 31, 2022.)	Democratic	Chapel Hill	Orange	1996
56th	Allen Buansi (Note: Appointed June 1, 2022.)	Democratic	Chapel Hill	Orange	2022↑
57th	Ashton Clemmons	Democratic	Greensboro	Guilford	2018
58th	Amos Quick	Democratic	Greensboro	Guilford	2016
59th	Jon Hardister	Republican	Whitsett	Guilford	2012
60th	Cecil Brockman	Democratic	High Point	Guilford	2014
61st	Pricey Harrison	Democratic	Greensboro	Guilford	2004
62nd	John Faircloth	Republican	High Point	Guilford	2010
63rd	Ricky Hurtado	Democratic	Burlington	Alamance	2020
64th	Dennis Riddell	Republican	Snow Camp	Alamance	2012
65th	Jerry Carter (Note: Died August 3, 2021.)	Republican	Reidsville	Rockingham	2018
65th	Reece Pyrtle (Note: Appointed August 11, 2021.)	Republican	Stoneville	Rockingham	2021↑
66th	Ben Moss	Republican	Rockingham	Montgomery, Richmond, Stanly	2020
67th	Wayne Sasser	Republican	Albemarle	Cabarrus, Stanly	2018
68th	David Willis	Republican	Waxhaw	Union	2020
69th	Dean Arp	Republican	Monroe	Union	2012
70th	Pat Hurley	Republican	Asheboro	Randolph	2006
71st	Evelyn Terry	Democratic	Winston-Salem	Forsyth	2012
72nd	Amber Baker	Democratic	Winston-Salem	Forsyth	2020
73rd	Lee Zachary	Republican	Yadkinville	Forsyth, Yadkin	2014
74th	Jeff Zenger	Republican	Lewisville	Forsyth	2020
75th	Donny Lambeth	Republican	Winston-Salem	Forsyth	2012
76th	Harry Warren	Republican	Salisbury	Rowan	2010
77th	Julia C. Howard	Republican	Mocksville	Davie, Rowan	1988
78th	Allen McNeill	Republican	Asheboro	Moore, Randolph	2012↑
79th	Keith Kidwell	Republican	Chocowinity	Beaufort, Craven	2018
80th	Sam Watford	Republican	Thomasville	Davidson	2020 (2015–2019)
81st	Larry Potts	Republican	Lexington	Davidson	2016
82nd	Larry Pittman	Republican	Concord	Cabarrus, Rowan	2011↑
83rd	Kristin Baker	Republican	Concord	Cabarrus	2020↑
84th	Jeffrey McNeely	Republican	Stony Point	Iredell	2019↑
85th	Dudley Greene	Republican	Marion	Avery, McDowell, Mitchell	2020
86th	Hugh Blackwell	Republican	Valdese	Burke	2008
87th	Destin Hall	Republican	Granite Falls	Caldwell	2016
88th	Mary Belk	Democratic	Charlotte	Mecklenburg	2016
89th	Mitchell Setzer	Republican	Catawba	Catawba	1998
90th	Sarah Stevens	Republican	Mount Airy	Alleghany, Surry, Wilkes	2008
91st	Kyle Hall	Republican	King	Rockingham, Stokes, Surry	2016
92nd	Terry Brown	Democratic	Charlotte	Mecklenburg	2020
93rd	Ray Pickett	Republican	Blowing Rock	Ashe, Watauga	2020
94th	Jeffrey Elmore	Republican	North Wilkesboro	Alleghany, Wilkes	2012
95th	Grey Mills	Republican	Mooresville	Iredell	2020 (2009–2013)
96th	Jay Adams	Republican	Hickory	Catawba	2014
97th	Jason Saine	Republican	Lincolnton	Lincoln	2011↑
98th	John Bradford	Republican	Cornelius	Mecklenburg	2020 (2015–2019)
99th	Nasif Majeed	Democratic	Charlotte	Mecklenburg	2018
100th	John Autry	Democratic	Charlotte	Mecklenburg	2016
101st	Carolyn Logan	Democratic	Charlotte	Mecklenburg	2018
102nd	Becky Carney	Democratic	Charlotte	Mecklenburg	2002
103rd	Rachel Hunt	Democratic	Charlotte	Mecklenburg	2018
104th	Brandon Lofton	Democratic	Charlotte	Mecklenburg	2018
105th	Wesley Harris	Democratic	Charlotte	Mecklenburg	2018
106th	Carla Cunningham	Democratic	Charlotte	Mecklenburg	2012
107th	Kelly Alexander	Democratic	Charlotte	Mecklenburg	2008
108th	John Torbett	Republican	Stanley	Gaston	2010
109th	Donnie Loftis	Republican	Gastonia	Gaston	2021↑
110th	Kelly Hastings	Republican	Cherryville	Cleveland, Gaston	2010
111th	Tim Moore	Republican	Kings Mountain	Cleveland	2002
112th	David Rogers	Republican	Rutherfordton	Burke, Rutherford	2016↑
113th	Jake Johnson	Republican	Saluda	Henderson, Polk, Transylvania	2019↑
114th	Susan Fisher (Note: Resigned January 31, 2022.)	Democratic	Asheville	Buncombe	2004↑
114th	Caleb Rudow (Note: Appointed February 1, 2022.)	Democratic	Asheville	Buncombe	2022↑
115th	John Ager	Democratic	Fairview	Buncombe	2014
116th	Brian Turner	Democratic	Asheville	Buncombe	2014
117th	Tim Moffitt	Republican	Hendersonville	Henderson	2020↑ (2011–2015)
118th	Mark Pless	Republican	Canton	Haywood, Madison, Yancey	2020
119th	Mike Clampitt	Republican	Bryson City	Haywood, Jackson, Swain	2020 (2017–2019)
120th	Karl Gillespie	Republican	Franklin	Cherokee, Clay, Graham, Macon	2020

- ↑: Member was first appointed to office.

== Senate ==
The North Carolina Senate leadership and members are listed below.

=== Senate leadership ===
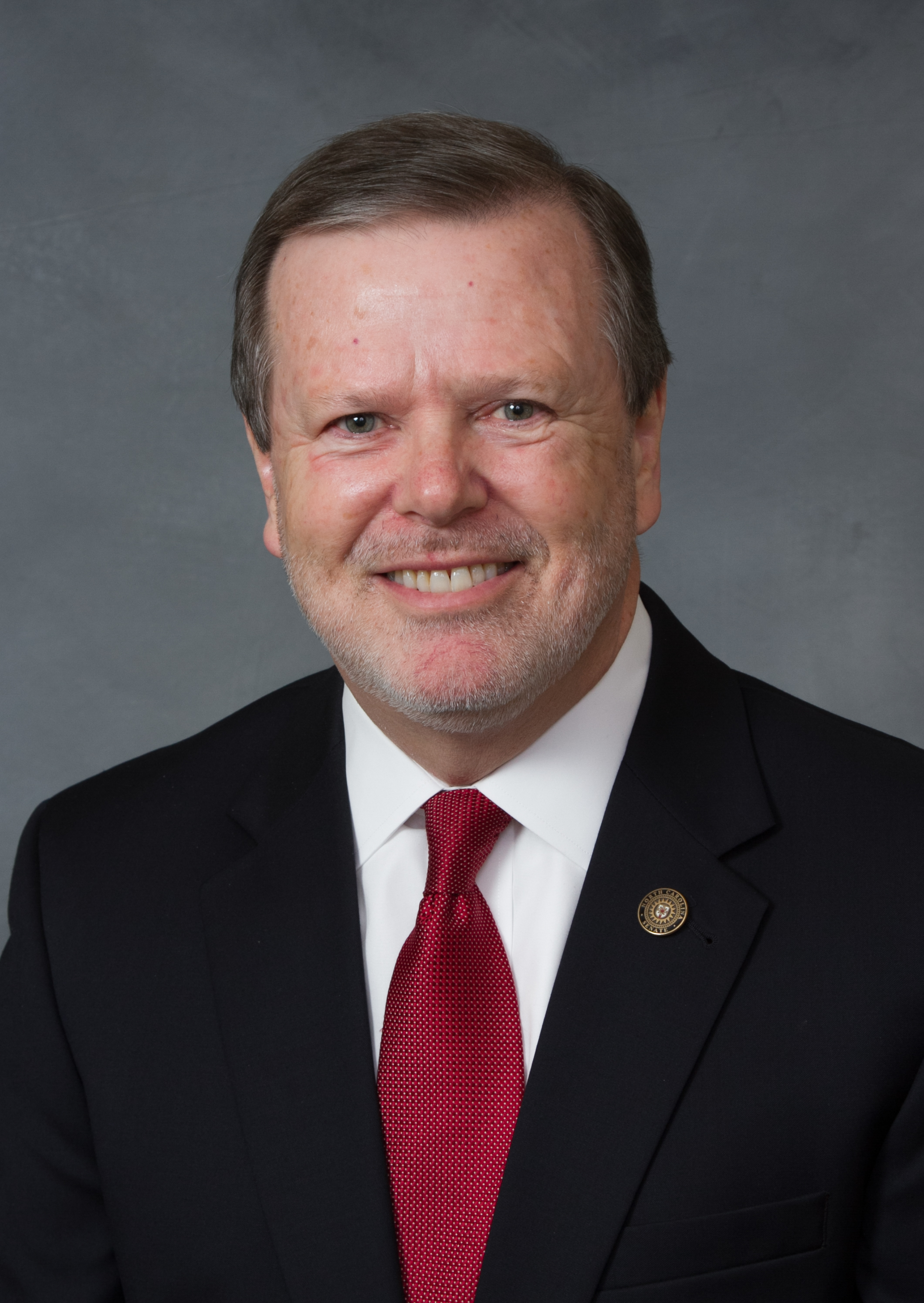
President Pro Tempore Phil Berger

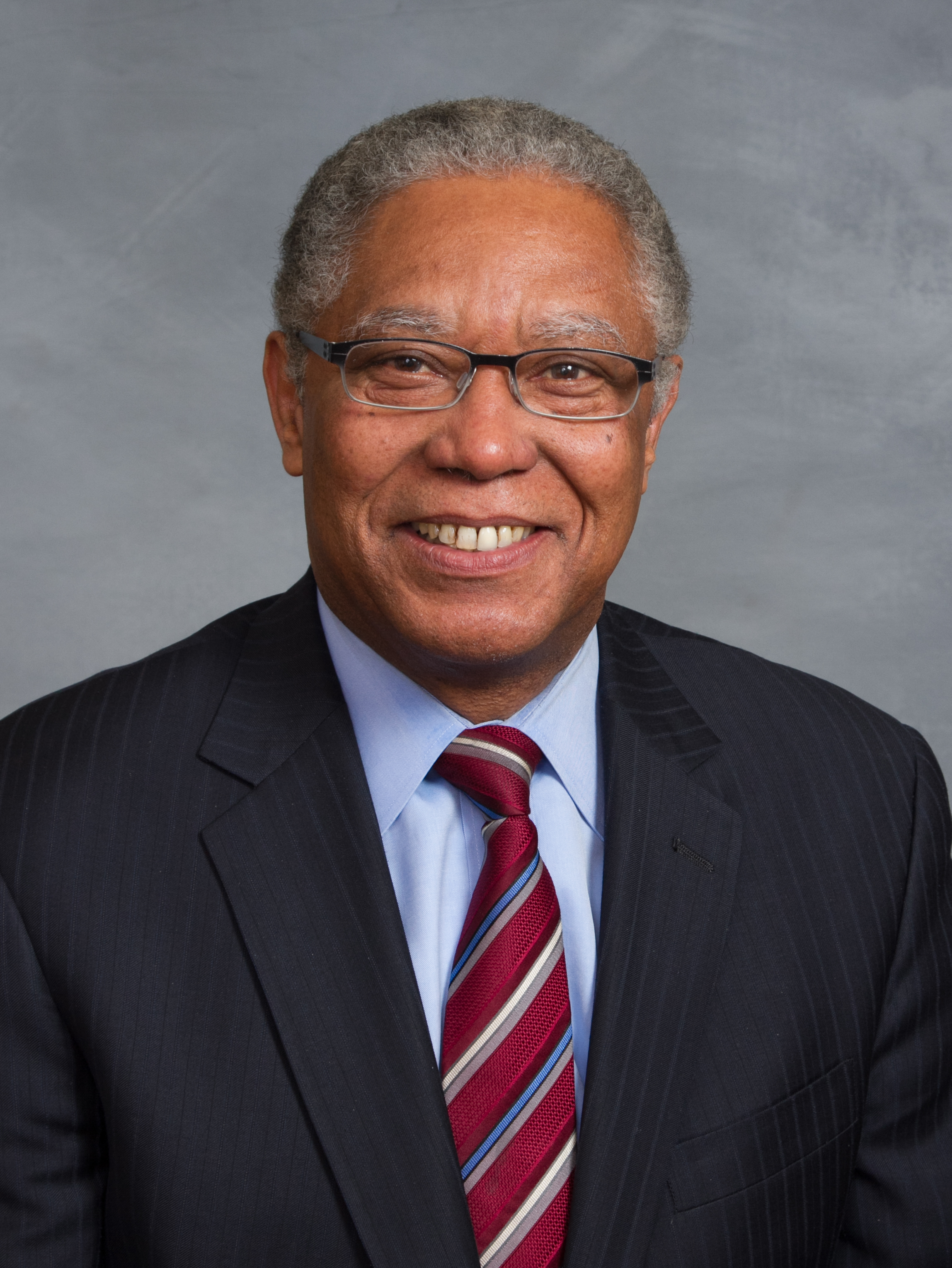
Minority Leader Dan Blue

North Carolina Senate officers
Position	Name	Party
President Pro Tempore	Phil Berger	Republican
Deputy President Pro Tempore	Ralph Hise	Republican
Majority Leader	Kathy Harrington	Republican
Majority Whip	Jim Perry	Republican
Joint Majority Caucus Leader	Norman W. Sanderson	Republican
Minority Whip	Jay Chaudhuri	Democratic
Minority Caucus Secretary	Ben Clark	Democratic

=== Members of the Senate ===
The district, party, home residence, counties represented, and date first elected is listed below for the members of the Senate:

District	Senator	Party	Residence	Counties represented	First elected
1st	Bob Steinburg	Republican	Edenton	Camden, Chowan, Currituck, Dare, Gates, Hertford, Hyde, Pasquotank, Perquimans, Tyrrell, Washington	2018
2nd	Norman W. Sanderson	Republican	Minnesott Beach	Carteret, Craven, Pamlico	2012
3rd	Ernestine Bazemore	Democratic	Aulander	Beaufort, Bertie, Martin, Northampton, Vance, Warren	2020
4th	Toby Fitch	Democratic	Wilson	Edgecombe, Halifax, Wilson	2018↑
5th	Don Davis	Democratic	Greenville	Greene, Pitt	2012
6th	Michael Lazzara	Republican	Jacksonville	Jones, Onslow	2020
7th	Jim Perry	Republican	Kinston	Lenoir, Wayne	2019↑
8th	Bill Rabon	Republican	Southport	Bladen, Brunswick, New Hanover (part), Pender	2010
9th	Michael Lee	Republican	Wilmington	New Hanover (part)	2020
10th	Brent Jackson	Republican	Autryville	Duplin, Johnston (part), Samson	2010
11th	Lisa Stone Barnes	Republican	Spring Hope	Johnston (part), Nash	2020
12th	Jim Burgin	Republican	Angier	Harnett, Johnston (part), Lee	2018
13th	Danny Britt	Republican	Lumberton	Columbus, Robeson	2016
14th	Dan Blue	Democratic	Raleigh	Wake (part)	2009↑
15th	Jay Chaudhuri	Democratic	Raleigh	Wake (part)	2016↑
16th	Wiley Nickel	Democratic	Cary	Wake (part)	2018
17th	Sydney Batch	Democratic	Apex	Wake (part)	2021↑
18th	Sarah Crawford	Democratic	Raleigh	Franklin, Wake (part)	2020
19th	Kirk deViere	Democratic	Fayetteville	Cumberland (part)	2018
20th	Natalie Murdock	Democratic	Durham	Durham (part)	2020↑
21st	Ben Clark	Democratic	Raeford	Cumberland (part), Hoke	2012
22nd	Mike Woodard	Democratic	Durham	Durham (part), Granville, Person	2012
23rd	Valerie Foushee	Democratic	Hillsborough	Chatham, Orange	2013↑
24th	Amy Galey	Republican	Burlington	Alamance, Guilford (part)	2020
25th	Tom McInnis	Republican	Ellerbe	Anson, Moore, Richmond, Scotland	2014
26th	Dave Craven	Republican	Asheboro	Guilford (part), Randolph	2020↑
27th	Michael Garrett	Democratic	Greensboro	Guilford (part)	2018
28th	Gladys A. Robinson	Democratic	Greensboro	Guilford (part)	2010
29th	Steve Jarvis	Republican	Lexington	Davidson, Montgomery	2020
30th	Phil Berger	Republican	Eden	Caswell, Rockingham, Stokes, Surry (part)	2000
31st	Joyce Krawiec	Republican	Kernersville	Davie, Forsyth (part)	2014↑
32nd	Paul A. Lowe Jr.	Democratic	Winston-Salem	Forsyth (part)	2015↑
33rd	Carl Ford	Republican	China Grove	Rowan, Stanly	2018
34th	Vickie Sawyer	Republican	Mooresville	Iredell, Yadkin	2018↑
35th	Todd Johnson	Republican	Monroe	Union (part)	2018
36th	Paul Newton	Republican	Mount Pleasant	Cabarrus, Union (part)	2016
37th	Jeff Jackson	Democratic	Charlotte	Mecklenburg (part)	2014↑
38th	Mujtaba Mohammed	Democratic	Charlotte	Mecklenburg (part)	2018
39th	DeAndrea Salvador	Democratic	Charlotte	Mecklenburg (part)	2020
40th	Joyce Waddell	Democratic	Charlotte	Mecklenburg (part)	2014
41st	Natasha Marcus	Democratic	Davidson	Mecklenburg (part)	2018
42nd	Dean Proctor	Republican	Hickory	Alexander, Catawba	2020↑
43rd	Kathy Harrington	Republican	Gastonia	Gaston (part)	2010
44th	Ted Alexander	Republican	Shelby	Cleveland, Gaston (part)	2018
45th	Deanna Ballard	Republican	Blowing Rock	Alleghany, Ashe, Surry (part) Watauga, Wilkes	2016↑
46th	Warren Daniel	Republican	Morganton	Avery, Burke, Caldwell	2010
47th	Ralph Hise	Republican	Spruce Pine	Madison, McDowell, Mitchell, Polk, Rutherford, Yancey	2010
48th	Chuck Edwards	Republican	Flat Rock	Buncombe (part), Henderson, Transylvania	2016↑
49th	Julie Mayfield	Democratic	Asheville	Buncombe (part)	2020
50th	Kevin Corbin	Republican	Franklin	Cherokee, Clay, Graham, Haywood, Jackson, Macon, Swain	2020

- ↑: Member was originally appointed to fill the remainder of an unexpired term.

== See also ==
- List of North Carolina state legislatures
