= Roger West (North Carolina politician) =

American politician from North Carolina

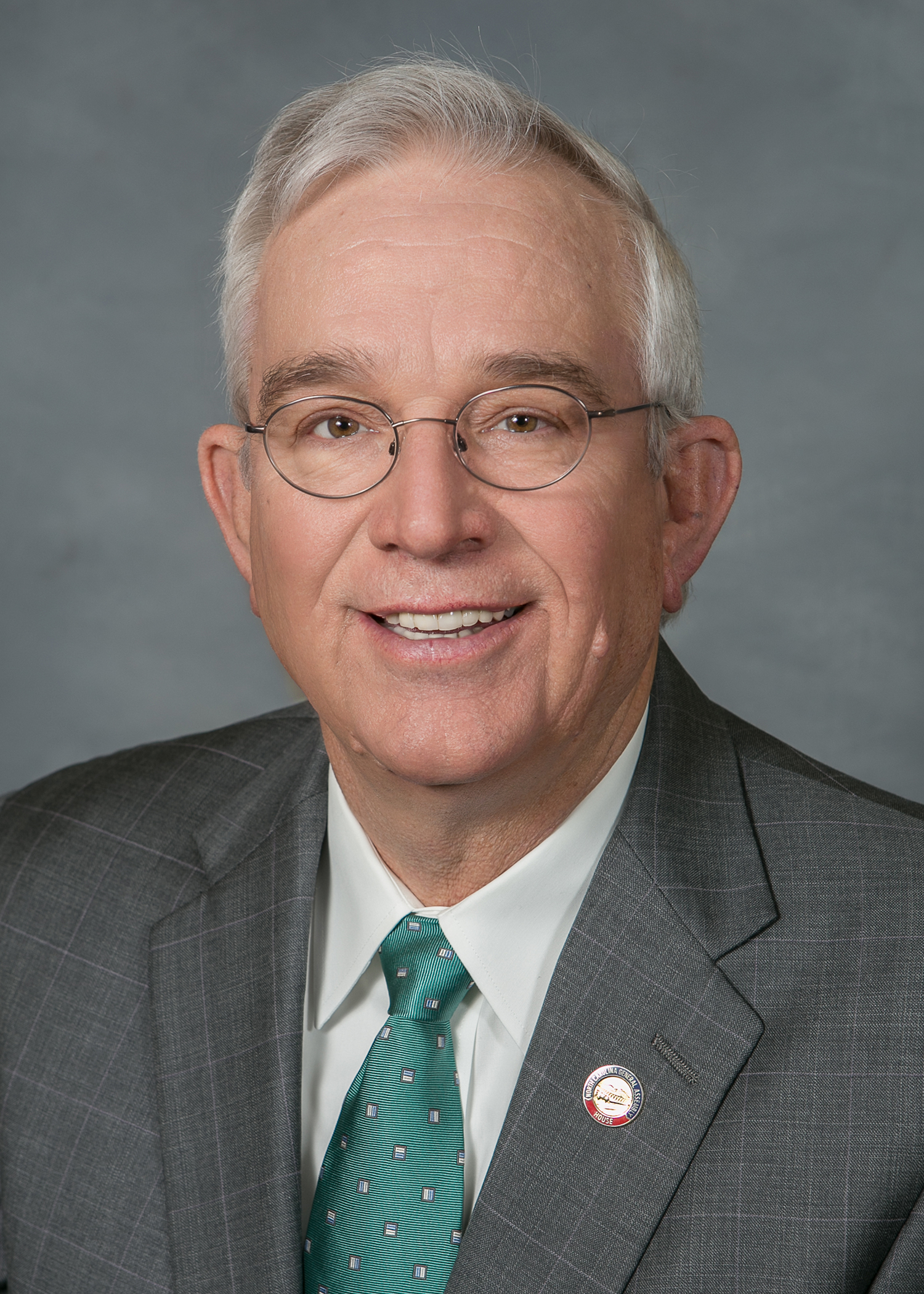

Member of the North Carolina House of Representatives
- In office May 5, 2000 – January 1, 2017
- Preceded by: James C. Carpenter
- Succeeded by: Kevin Corbin
- Constituency: 53rd District (2000-2003); 120th District (2003-2017)

Personal details
- Born: November 1, 1948 (age 77); Murphy, North Carolina, U.S.
- Party: Republican
- Spouse: Judy
- Children: 2
- Occupation: Owner of West Construction Inc.
- Website: Roger West for House

Military service
- Allegiance: United States
- Branch/service: United States Navy
- Years of service: 1968–1971 Active Duty

Thomas Roger West (born November 1, 1948) is a former Republican member of the North Carolina House of Representatives representing the state's 120th district, including constituents in Cherokee, Clay, Graham and Macon counties. A contractor from Marble, North Carolina, West served 8.5 term in the state House.

== Possum drop law ==
Representative West represented Brasstown, North Carolina, which held an annual "Possum Drop" on New Year's Eve, which involved capturing a wild opossum, enclosing it in a clear plastic box, suspending it high in the air, and lowering it to the ground with the countdown to midnight. During the suspension and lowering, fireworks are set off, muskets are fired, crowds of people scream, and loud music is played. The possum is later released. People for the Ethical Treatment of Animals filed a lawsuit in October 2013 attempting to outlaw the practice, claiming it makes it likely that the possum will die from stress-related ailments within days or weeks.

West was the sponsor of a law in the North Carolina House that exempts opossums from state wildlife laws from Dec. 26, 2014 to Jan. 2, 2015 in Clay County, where the drop is held. West jokingly noted when asked by another committee member that the marsupial community was in support of the bill. Its consideration was met with some joking by committee members and passed easily.

North Carolina House of Representatives
Preceded by James C. Carpenter	Member of the North Carolina House of Representatives from the 53rd district 2000–2003	Succeeded by David Lewis
Preceded by Constituency established	Member of the North Carolina House of Representatives from the 120th district 2003–2017	Succeeded by Kevin Corbin
