= Karl Gillespie =

American politician

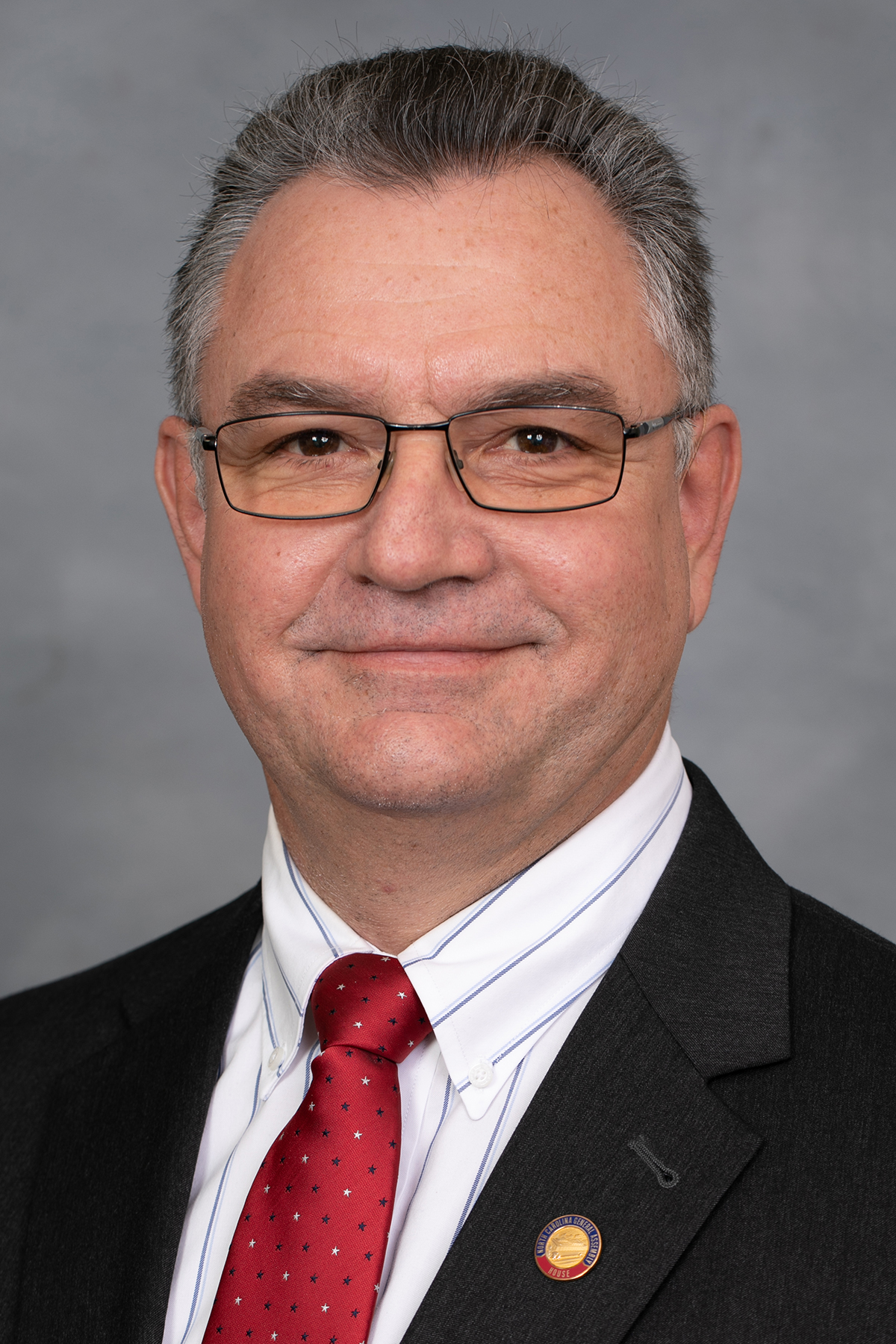

Member of the North Carolina House of Representatives from the 120th district
- Incumbent
- Assumed office January 1, 2021
- Preceded by: Kevin Corbin

Member of the Macon County Board of Commissioners from the 2nd district
- In office December 5, 2016 – December 7, 2020
- Preceded by: Kevin Corbin
- Succeeded by: Josh Young

Personal details
- Born: Karl Ellis Gillespie; September 6, 1962 (age 63)
- Party: Republican
- Spouse: Janet
- Children: 1
- Education: Southwestern Community College (attended)
- Website: State House website

Karl Ellis Gillespie is a Republican member of the North Carolina House of Representatives who has represented the 120th district (including all of Cherokee, Clay, Graham, and Macon counties) since 2021. Gillespie previously served on the Macon County board of commissioners from 2016 to 2020.

== Electoral history ==
Macon County Board of Commissioners 2nd district Republican primary election, 2016
Party	Candidate	Votes	%
Republican	Karl Gillespie	3,181	56.51%
Republican	Ron Haven	2,448	43.49%
Total votes		5,629	100%

Macon County Board of Commissioners 2nd district general election, 2016
Party	Candidate	Votes	%
Republican	Karl Gillespie	10,623	62.32%
Democratic	Charlie Leatherman	6,424	37.68%
Total votes		17,047	100%
Republican hold			

North Carolina House of Representatives 120th district general election, 2020
Party	Candidate	Votes	%
Republican	Karl Gillespie	34,933	74.19%
Democratic	Susan Landis	12,155	25.81%
Total votes		47,088	100%
Republican hold			

== Committee assignments ==
=== 2021-2022 session ===
- Federal Relations and American Indian Affairs (Vice chair)
- Agriculture
- Wildlife Resources Committee (Vice chair)
- Appropriations
- Appropriations - Education
