= Henrico, North Carolina =

- Unincorporated community
- Location within North Carolina Location within the United States
- Coordinates: 36°32′04″N 77°49′51″W
- Country: United States
- State: North Carolina
- County: Northampton
- Elevation: 272 ft (83 m)
- Time zone: UTC-5 (Eastern (EST))
  - Summer (DST): UTC-4 (EDT)
- ZIP code: 27842
- Area code: 252
- GNIS feature ID: 986618

Henrico is an unincorporated community in Northampton County, North Carolina, United States. The community is 11 miles (18 km) west-northwest of Roanoke Rapids. Henrico has a post office with ZIP code 27842.
