= Kevin Corbin =

American politician

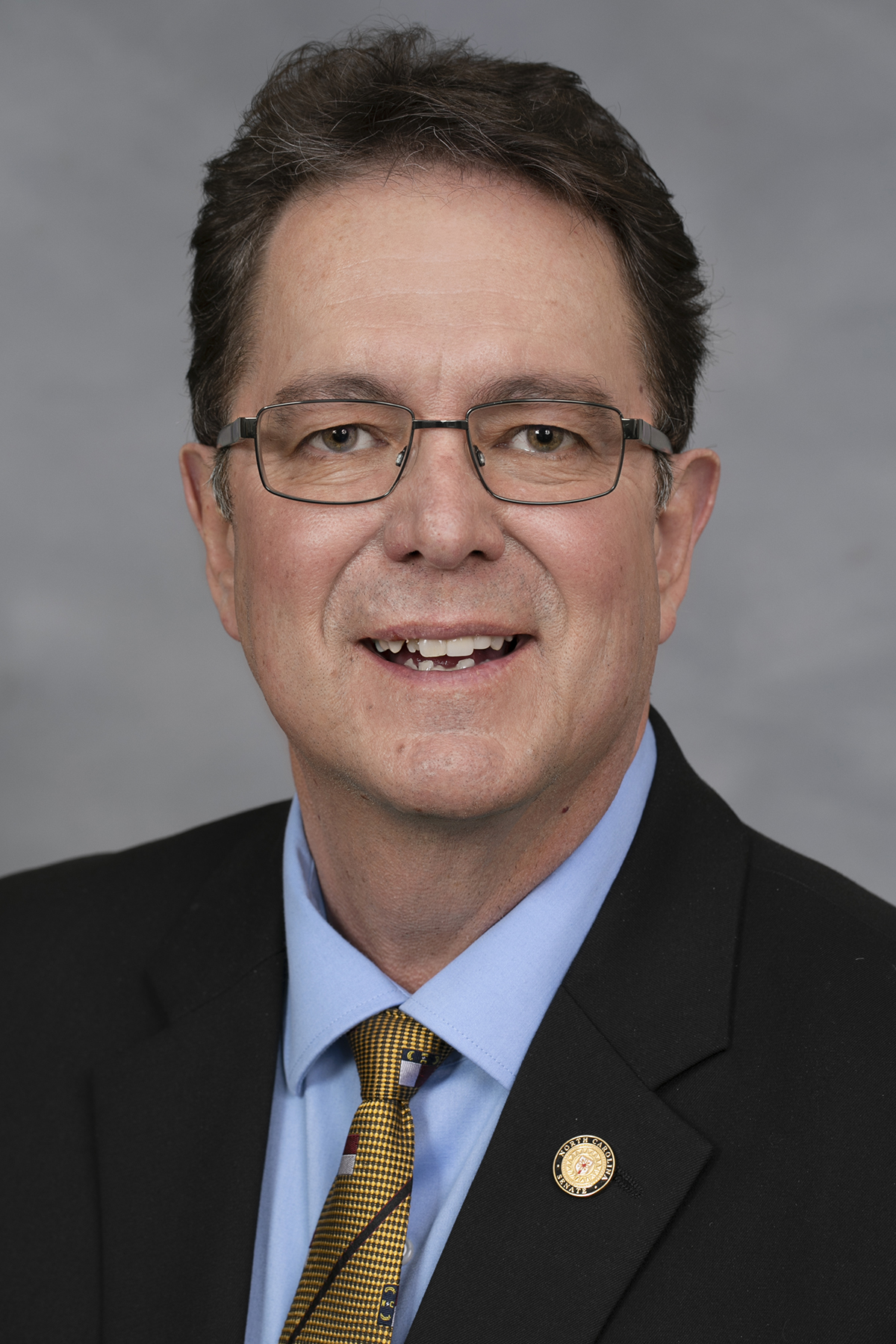

Member of the North Carolina Senate from the 50th district
- Incumbent
- Assumed office January 1, 2021
- Preceded by: Jim Davis

Member of the North Carolina House of Representatives from the 120th district
- In office January 1, 2017 – January 1, 2021
- Preceded by: Roger West
- Succeeded by: Karl Gillespie

Personal details
- Born: Harold Kevin Corbin; 1960 or 1961 (age 64–65) Macon County, North Carolina, U.S.
- Party: Republican
- Spouse: Beth
- Children: 2
- Education: Appalachian State University (BS)
- Website: State Senate website Campaign website

Harold Kevin Corbin (born 1960/1961 in Macon County, North Carolina) is a Republican member of the North Carolina Senate, having represented the 50th district since 2021. Corbin previously served two terms in the North Carolina House of Representatives, representing the 120th district from 2017 to 2021. An insurance executive from Franklin, North Carolina, he also served as a member of the Macon County board of commissioners from 2011 to 2016 and served 20 years on the Macon County School Board.

== Political positions ==
Corbin supports Medicaid expansion, one of the first Republicans in the North Carolina General Assembly to do so. During the 2021-2022 session, Corbin and Sen. Jim Burgin announced they were working on a bill to expand coverage to 12 months for new mothers. The bill was referred to Appropriations where it was approved and signed by the Governor.

== Electoral history ==
=== 2024 ===
North Carolina Senate 50th district Republican general election, 2024
Party	Candidate	Votes	%
Republican	Kevin Corbin	83,381	66.53%
Democratic	Adam Tebrugge	41,939	33.47%
Total votes		125,320	100%

=== 2022 ===
North Carolina Senate 50th district Republican primary election, 2022
Party	Candidate	Votes	%
Republican	Kevin Corbin	59,534	66.2%
Democratic	Karen McCracken	30,347	33.8%
Total votes		89,881	100%

=== 2020 ===
North Carolina Senate 50th district Republican primary election, 2020
Party	Candidate	Votes	%
Republican	Kevin Corbin	20,077	78.15%
Republican	Sarah Conway	5,613	21.85%
Total votes		25,690	100%

North Carolina Senate 50th district general election, 2020
Party	Candidate	Votes	%
Republican	Kevin Corbin	73,875	66.66%
Democratic	Victoria Fox	36,954	33.34%
Total votes		110,829	100%
Republican hold			

=== 2018 ===
North Carolina House of Representatives 120th district general election, 2018
Party	Candidate	Votes	%
Republican	Kevin Corbin (incumbent)	25,619	73.44%
Democratic	Aaron Martin	9,267	26.56%
Total votes		34,886	100%
Republican hold			

=== 2016 ===
North Carolina House of Representatives 120th district Republican primary election, 2016
Party	Candidate	Votes	%
Republican	Kevin Corbin	10,135	73.86%
Republican	Elliott J. Southworth	3,587	26.14%
Total votes		13,722	100%

North Carolina House of Representatives 120th district general election, 2016
Party	Candidate	Votes	%
Republican	Kevin Corbin	29,047	72.03%
Democratic	Randy Hogsed	11,282	27.97%
Total votes		40,329	100%
Republican hold			
