= North Carolina's 81st House district =

American legislative district

North Carolina's 81st State House of Representatives district
Representative
| Larry Potts; R–Lexington |
- Demographics: 77% White; 9% Black; 8% Hispanic; 2% Asian; 1% Other; 3% Multiracial
- Population (2024): 85,583

North Carolina's 81st House district is one of 120 districts in the North Carolina House of Representatives. It has been represented by Republican Larry Potts since 2017.

== Geography ==
Since 2003, the district has included part of Davidson County. The district overlaps with the 30th Senate district.

== District officeholders ==
| Representative | Party | Dates | Notes | Counties |
|---|---|---|---|---|
District created January 1, 1993.
| Tim Tallent (Concord) | Republican | January 1, 1993 – January 1, 2001 | Redistricted from the 34th district. Retired. | 1993–2003; Parts of Cabarrus and Union counties. |
| Jeff Barnhart (Concord) | Republican | January 1, 2001 – January 1, 2003 | Redistricted to the 75th district. | 1993–2003; Parts of Cabarrus and Union counties. |
| Hugh Holliman (Lexington) | Democratic | January 1, 2003 – January 1, 2011 | Redistricted from the 37th district. Lost re-election. | 2003–Present; Part of Davidson County. |
| Rayne Brown (Lexington) | Republican | January 1, 2011 – January 1, 2017 | Retired. | 2003–Present; Part of Davidson County. |
| Larry Potts (Lexington) | Republican | January 1, 2017 – Present | | 2003–Present; Part of Davidson County. |

== Election results ==
=== 2026 ===
North Carolina House of Representatives 81st district Republican primary election, 2026
| Party | Candidate | Votes | % |
|---|---|---|---|
| Republican | Larry Potts (incumbent) | 6,929 | 83.12% |
| Republican | Pamela Zanni | 1,407 | 16.88% |
| Total votes | | 8,336 | 100% |

North Carolina House of Representatives 81st district general election, 2026
| Party | Candidate | Votes | % |
|---|---|---|---|
| Republican | Larry Potts (incumbent) | | |
| Democratic | Dylan Tucker | | |
| Total votes | | | 100% |

=== 2024 ===
North Carolina House of Representatives 81st district general election, 2024
| Party | Candidate | Votes | % |
|---|---|---|---|
| Republican | Larry Potts (incumbent) | 33,971 | 75.70% |
| Democratic | Pamela McAfee | 13,293 | 28.13% |
| Total votes | | 47,264 | 100% |
| Republican hold | | | |

=== 2022 ===
North Carolina House of Representatives 81st district general election, 2022
| Party | Candidate | Votes | % |
|---|---|---|---|
| Republican | Larry Potts (incumbent) | 21,922 | 74.23% |
| Democratic | Joe Watkins | 7,612 | 25.77% |
| Total votes | | 29,534 | 100% |
| Republican hold | | | |

=== 2020 ===
North Carolina House of Representatives 81st district general election, 2020
| Party | Candidate | Votes | % |
|---|---|---|---|
| Republican | Larry Potts (incumbent) | 32,092 | 73.00% |
| Democratic | Robert Lewis Jordan | 11,872 | 27.00% |
| Total votes | | 43,964 | 100% |
| Republican hold | | | |

=== 2018 ===
North Carolina House of Representatives 81st district Republican primary election, 2018
| Party | Candidate | Votes | % |
|---|---|---|---|
| Republican | Larry Potts (incumbent) | 7,697 | 73.08% |
| Republican | Eric S. Osborne | 2,835 | 26.92% |
| Total votes | | 10,532 | 100% |

North Carolina House of Representatives 81st district general election, 2018
| Party | Candidate | Votes | % |
|---|---|---|---|
| Republican | Larry Potts (incumbent) | 20,276 | 71.84% |
| Democratic | Lewie Phillips | 7,946 | 28.16% |
| Total votes | | 28,222 | 100% |
| Republican hold | | | |

=== 2016 ===
North Carolina House of Representatives 81st district Republican primary election, 2016
| Party | Candidate | Votes | % |
|---|---|---|---|
| Republican | Larry Potts | 5,817 | 52.24% |
| Republican | Tyler Lohr Forrest | 3,091 | 27.76% |
| Republican | Sharon Phillips Pearce | 2,228 | 20.01% |
| Total votes | | 11,136 | 100% |

North Carolina House of Representatives 81st district general election, 2016
| Party | Candidate | Votes | % |
|---|---|---|---|
| Republican | Larry Potts | 24,379 | 68.07% |
| Democratic | Andy Hedrick | 11,438 | 31.93% |
| Total votes | | 35,817 | 100% |
| Republican hold | | | |

=== 2014 ===
North Carolina House of Representatives 81st district general election, 2014
| Party | Candidate | Votes | % |
|---|---|---|---|
| Republican | Rayne Brown (incumbent) | 15,090 | 100% |
| Total votes | | 15,090 | 100% |
| Republican hold | | | |

=== 2012 ===
North Carolina House of Representatives 81st district general election, 2012
| Party | Candidate | Votes | % |
|---|---|---|---|
| Republican | Rayne Brown (incumbent) | 25,775 | 100% |
| Total votes | | 25,775 | 100% |
| Republican hold | | | |

=== 2010 ===
North Carolina House of Representatives 81st district Republican primary election, 2010
| Party | Candidate | Votes | % |
|---|---|---|---|
| Republican | Rayne Brown | 2,883 | 59.73% |
| Republican | Fred D. McClure | 1,944 | 40.27% |
| Total votes | | 4,827 | 100% |

North Carolina House of Representatives 81st district general election, 2010
| Party | Candidate | Votes | % |
|---|---|---|---|
| Republican | Rayne Brown | 8,744 | 57.48% |
| Democratic | Hugh Holliman (incumbent) | 6,469 | 42.52% |
| Total votes | | 15,213 | 100% |
| Republican gain from Democratic | | | |

=== 2008 ===
North Carolina House of Representatives 81st district general election, 2008
| Party | Candidate | Votes | % |
|---|---|---|---|
| Democratic | Hugh Holliman (incumbent) | 12,975 | 52.64% |
| Republican | Rayne Brown | 11,673 | 47.36% |
| Total votes | | 24,648 | 100% |
| Democratic hold | | | |

=== 2006 ===
North Carolina House of Representatives 81st district general election, 2006
| Party | Candidate | Votes | % |
|---|---|---|---|
| Democratic | Hugh Holliman (incumbent) | 8,454 | 100% |
| Total votes | | 8,454 | 100% |
| Democratic hold | | | |

=== 2004 ===
North Carolina House of Representatives 81st district general election, 2004
| Party | Candidate | Votes | % |
|---|---|---|---|
| Democratic | Hugh Holliman (incumbent) | 15,141 | 100% |
| Total votes | | 15,141 | 100% |
| Democratic hold | | | |

=== 2002 ===
North Carolina House of Representatives 81st district general election, 2002
| Party | Candidate | Votes | % |
|---|---|---|---|
| Democratic | Hugh Holliman (incumbent) | 9,074 | 53.20% |
| Republican | John T. Walser Jr. | 7,540 | 44.21% |
| Libertarian | Stuart Britt | 442 | 2.59% |
| Total votes | | 17,056 | 100% |
| Democratic hold | | | |

=== 2000 ===
North Carolina House of Representatives 81st district general election, 2000
| Party | Candidate | Votes | % |
|---|---|---|---|
| Republican | Jeff Barnhart | 23,157 | 62.83% |
| Democratic | Hector H. Henry II | 13,697 | 37.17% |
| Total votes | | 36,854 | 100% |
| Republican hold | | | |
