= Larry Potts =

American politician

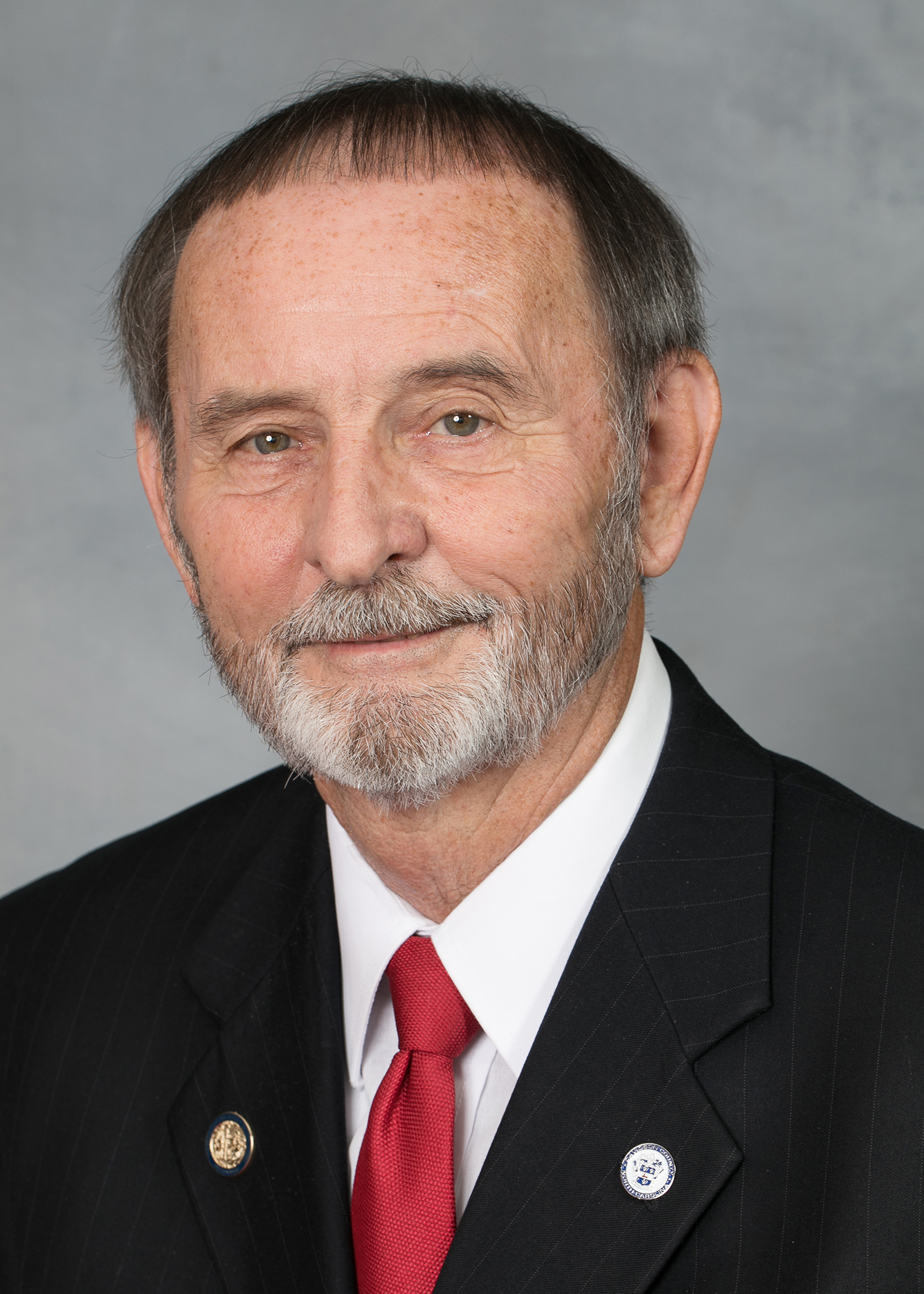

Member of the North Carolina House of Representatives from the 81st district
- Incumbent
- Assumed office January 1, 2017
- Preceded by: Rayne Brown

Personal details
- Born: September 14, 1948 (age 78) Lexington, North Carolina, U.S.
- Party: Republican
- Spouse: Carolyn
- Children: 3
- Education: Davidson County Community College

Larry W. Potts (born September 14, 1948) is an American politician. He was elected to the North Carolina House of Representatives in 2016. A Republican, he serves the 81st district.

== Career ==
Potts previously served on the board of Davidson County Social Services. He also previously served as Chairman of the NC Social Services Commission prior to taking his seat in the NC General Assembly.

In 2018 he was appointed by the Speaker of the House as Chairman of the Health Committee, DHHS Appropriations Committee, and vice-chairman of the House Appropriations Committee. In 2022 the Speaker of the House appointed Rep Potts Senior Chair of the House Health Committee and Chair of the House Appropriations Committee for HHS. Prior to being elected to the NC General Assembly he served almost 21 years as a Davidson County Commissioner-serving 9 terms as chairman.

Rep. Potts has served on the executive board of Directors for WFBH-Lexington Medical Center as well as 24 years on the Davidson County Economic Development Commission, and positions on various other boards and commissions. In January 2020 Rep. Potts received the Legislator of the Year Award from the National MS Society.

== Electoral history ==
=== 2020 ===
North Carolina House of Representatives 81st district general election, 2020
Party	Candidate	Votes	%
Republican	Larry Potts (incumbent)	32,092	73.00%
Democratic	Robert Lewis Jordan	11,872	27.00%
Total votes		43,964	100%
Republican hold			

=== 2018 ===
North Carolina House of Representatives 81st district Republican primary election, 2018
Party	Candidate	Votes	%
Republican	Larry Potts (incumbent)	7,697	73.08%
Republican	Eric S. Osborne	2,835	26.92%
Total votes		10,532	100%

North Carolina House of Representatives 81st district general election, 2018
Party	Candidate	Votes	%
Republican	Larry Potts (incumbent)	20,276	71.84%
Democratic	Lewie Phillips	7,946	28.16%
Total votes		28,222	100%
Republican hold			

=== 2016 ===
North Carolina House of Representatives 81st district Republican primary election, 2016
Party	Candidate	Votes	%
Republican	Larry Potts	5,817	52.24%
Republican	Tyler Lohr Forrest	3,091	27.76%
Republican	Sharon Phillips Pearce	2,228	20.01%
Total votes		11,136	100%

North Carolina House of Representatives 81st district general election, 2016
Party	Candidate	Votes	%
Republican	Larry Potts	24,379	68.07%
Democratic	Andy Hedrick	11,438	31.93%
Total votes		35,817	100%
Republican hold			

North Carolina House of Representatives
Preceded by Rayne Brown	Member of the North Carolina House of Representatives from the 81st district 2017-Present	Incumbent
