= North Carolina's 120th House district =

American legislative district

North Carolina's 120th State House of Representatives district
Representative
Karl Gillespie; R–Franklin
- Demographics: 87% White; 2% Black; 6% Hispanic; 1% Asian; 1% Native American; 3% Multiracial
- Population (2024): 87,185

North Carolina's 120th House district is one of 120 districts in the North Carolina House of Representatives. It has been represented by Republican Karl Gillespie since 2021.

== Geography ==
Since 2013, the district has included all of Graham, Cherokee, Clay, and Macon counties. The district overlaps with the 50th Senate district.

== List of members representing the district ==
Representative	Party	Dates	Notes	Counties
District created January 1, 2003.
Roger West (Marble)	Republican	January 1, 2003 – January 1, 2017	Redistricted from the 53rd district and re-elected in 2002. Re-elected in 2004. Re-elected in 2006. Re-elected in 2008. Re-elected in 2010. Re-elected in 2012. Re-elected in 2014. Retired.	2003–2013; All of Graham, Cherokee, and Clay counties. Part of Macon County.
Roger West (Marble)	Republican	January 1, 2003 – January 1, 2017	Redistricted from the 53rd district and re-elected in 2002. Re-elected in 2004. Re-elected in 2006. Re-elected in 2008. Re-elected in 2010. Re-elected in 2012. Re-elected in 2014. Retired.	2013–Present; All of Graham, Cherokee, Clay, and Macon counties.
Kevin Corbin (Franklin)	Republican	January 1, 2017 – January 1, 2021	Elected in 2016. Re-elected in 2018. Retired to run for North Carolina Senate.	2013–Present; All of Graham, Cherokee, Clay, and Macon counties.
Karl Gillespie (Franklin)	Republican	January 1, 2021 – present	Elected in 2020. Re-elected in 2022. Re-elected in 2024.	2013–Present; All of Graham, Cherokee, Clay, and Macon counties.

== Election results ==
=== 2024 ===
North Carolina House of Representatives 120th district general election, 2024
Party	Candidate	Votes	%
Republican	Karl Gillespie (incumbent)	38,040	75.16%
Democratic	Nancy Curtis	12,572	24.84%
Total votes		50,612	100%
Republican hold			

=== 2022 ===
North Carolina House of Representatives 120th district general election, 2022
Party	Candidate	Votes	%
Republican	Karl Gillespie (incumbent)	30,037	100%
Total votes		30,037	100%
Republican hold			

=== 2020 ===
North Carolina House of Representatives 120th district general election, 2020
Party	Candidate	Votes	%
Republican	Karl Gillespie	34,933	74.19%
Democratic	Susan Landis	12,155	25.81%
Total votes		47,088	100%
Republican hold			

=== 2018 ===
North Carolina House of Representatives 120th district general election, 2018
Party	Candidate	Votes	%
Republican	Kevin Corbin (incumbent)	25,619	73.44%
Democratic	Aaron Martin	9,267	26.56%
Total votes		34,886	100%
Republican hold			

=== 2016 ===
North Carolina House of Representatives 120th district Republican primary election, 2016
Party	Candidate	Votes	%
Republican	Kevin Corbin	10,135	73.86%
Republican	Elliott J. Southworth	3,587	26.14%
Total votes		13,722	100%

North Carolina House of Representatives 120th district general election, 2016
Party	Candidate	Votes	%
Republican	Kevin Corbin	29,047	72.03%
Democratic	Randy Hogsed	11,282	27.97%
Total votes		40,329	100%
Republican hold			

=== 2014 ===
North Carolina House of Representatives 120th district general election, 2014
Party	Candidate	Votes	%
Republican	Roger West (incumbent)	22,496	100%
Total votes		22,496	100%
Republican hold			

=== 2012 ===
North Carolina House of Representatives 120th district Republican primary election, 2012
Party	Candidate	Votes	%
Republican	Roger West (incumbent)	7,941	74.10%
Republican	Mike Edwards	2,775	25.90%
Total votes		10,716	100%

North Carolina House of Representatives 120th district general election, 2012
Party	Candidate	Votes	%
Republican	Roger West (incumbent)	28,903	100%
Total votes		28,903	100%
Republican hold			

=== 2010 ===
North Carolina House of Representatives 120th district Republican primary election, 2010
Party	Candidate	Votes	%
Republican	Roger West (incumbent)	4,466	72.65%
Republican	Tim West	1,681	27.35%
Total votes		6,147	100%

North Carolina House of Representatives 120th district general election, 2010
Party	Candidate	Votes	%
Republican	Roger West (incumbent)	20,086	72.11%
Democratic	Randy Hogsed	7,767	27.89%
Total votes		27,853	100%
Republican hold			

=== 2008 ===
North Carolina House of Representatives 120th district general election, 2008
Party	Candidate	Votes	%
Republican	Roger West (incumbent)	25,201	100%
Total votes		25,201	100%
Republican hold			

=== 2006 ===
North Carolina House of Representatives 120th district general election, 2006
Party	Candidate	Votes	%
Republican	Roger West (incumbent)	19,066	100%
Total votes		19,066	100%
Republican hold			

=== 2004 ===
North Carolina House of Representatives 120th district general election, 2004
Party	Candidate	Votes	%
Republican	Roger West (incumbent)	22,375	100%
Total votes		22,375	100%
Republican hold			

=== 2002 ===
North Carolina House of Representatives 120th district general election, 2002
Party	Candidate	Votes	%
Republican	Roger West (incumbent)	17,968	100%
Total votes		17,968	100%
Republican hold			
