= WSIF =

- Wilkesboro, North Carolina; United States
- Frequency: 90.9 MHz

Programming
- Format: Album Adult Alternative/Americana (rebroadcasts WNCW)

Ownership
- Owner: Isothermal Community College

Technical information
- Licensing authority: FCC
- Facility ID: 72460
- Class: A
- ERP: 1,000 Watts
- HAAT: -52.0 meters
- Transmitter coordinates: 36°8′12.4″N 81°11′1.3″W

Links
- Public license information: Public file; LMS
- Webcast: http://www.wncw.org/ListenLive.html
- Website: wncw.org

WSIF (90.9 FM) is a radio station with an Album Adult Alternative/Americana format, rebroadcasting the programming of station WNCW.

It is owned and operated by Isothermal Community College in Spindale, North Carolina, which took over the station on January 5, 2010.

Previously, the station was owned and operated by Wilkes Community College, Wilkesboro, North Carolina. According to FCC filings in May 2008, the school decided to end its broadcasting program, and requested permission to remain silent while the license was transferred to another educational institution. At the expiration of the six month "Stay Silent" authorization in November 2008, the College asked for an extension of the order to finalize the details of the transfer to an unspecified community college.

In 2009, Isothermal Community College acquired the license of WSIF, Wilkesboro, North Carolina, formerly operated by Wilkes Community College. WSIF began simulcasting WNCW programming in January, 2010.
