= North Carolina House Bill 11 =

The North Carolina State Seal. The North Carolina General Assembly is the state's legislative body.

North Carolina House Bill 11 (NCHB 11), titled "No Post-Secondary Education/Illegal Aliens", was brought before the North Carolina General Assembly by Representative George G. Cleveland. The bill was introduced on January 31, 2011, and is currently in committee. The bill calls for the prohibition of admission for undocumented students to North Carolina community colleges and universities.

== Provisions ==
A relatively short bill, NCHB 11 states its purpose as "an act prohibiting illegal aliens from attending North Carolina community colleges and universities." In its statement of purpose, the bill recalls the State's responsibility to "provide for the establishment, organization, and administration of a system of educational institutions throughout the State, offering courses of instruction in one or more of the general areas of two-year college parallel, technical, vocational, and adult education programs." In its effort to amend G.S. 115D-1, the bill further defines the only legal recipients of State education, as "students who are lawfully present in the United States. In sections 2 and 3 of the bill, the proposed law provides for two exceptions: any person "concurrently enrolled in secondary school [which they may lawfully attend, regardless of immigration status] during the quarter, term, or semester during which he/she will take class at a North Carolina community college or university, as well as any person who will not be in the United States during any portion of the class taken at an NC community college or constituent institution of the University of North Carolina." Section 4 states that upon passage of the bill, the law will be applied immediately, with the exception of undocumented students currently and previously enrolled in post-secondary education programs before the law being enacted; these students are permitted to complete their course of study.

== Background ==
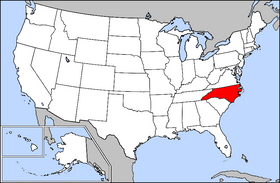
North Carolina

According to the 2010 United States census, North Carolina's population was 9,535,483. Of that populace, 800,120 are Hispanic or Latino. The Migration Policy Institute (MPI) reports that in 2009, 30.6% of the foreign born population in North Carolina were citizens. On a national scale, the MPI reports that 11.8% of the foreign-born migrant population that entered in the year 2000 or later, are citizens. These data reflect a national trend in the growing population of Latino-origin migrants, particularly in North Carolina. A statewide split in political ideologies has resulted in an array of policy proposals to manage this growing population in the context of education.

=== Legislative history ===
On January 27, 2011, Representative George Cleveland filed NCHB 11 with the North Carolina General Assembly." The bill passed its first reading on January 31, 2011, and was referred to the Committee on Education." NCHB 11 was co-sponsored by House Republican Representatives Larry Brown, William Current, John Faircloth, Dale Folwell, Phillip Frye, David Guice, Mike Hager, D. Craig Horn, Frank Iler, Dan Ingle, Bert Jones, Jonathan Jordan, James Langdon, Bill McGee, Shirley Randleman, Norman Sanderson, Mitchell Setzer, John Torbett, and Harry Warren." The bill currently awaits a decision from the North Carolina House Committee on Education."

=== North Carolina House Bill 1183 ===
In 2005, House Bill 1183 was introduced in the North Carolina General Assembly, but did not pass. This bill, sponsored primarily by Representatives Rick Glazier, Paul Luebke, Jeff Barnhart, and John Sauls, would have allowed undocumented students to gain access to institutions of higher education at in-state-tuition rates, by meeting three criteria. The student "must have received a high school diploma from a secondary or high school within NC, attended NC schools for four consecutive years prior to high school graduation, and have filed an affidavit of intent to legalize his or her immigration status." A policy initiative almost completely opposite of NCHB 11, this bill aimed to create avenues of access for undocumented students in North Carolina. In just six years, the policy proposal has shifted completely, in an effort to totally restrict access. This highlights the ever-changing ideological majority in North Carolina education policy for undocumented students.

=== Current admissions policies for undocumented students ===
The North Carolina Community College System policy on admission of undocumented students has varied over the last decade, ranging from more stringent regulations with narrow criteria, to actively pursuing an "open door," increased access policy. Former North Carolina Community College System (NCCCS) President Martin Lancaster announced in a recent study, that the state's 58 community colleges will "maintain an open door policy to all applicants who are high school graduates or at least 18 years of age." North Carolina community colleges enroll 883,000 students each year, which makes up 37.3% of students enrolled in post-secondary education in the state. Within community colleges, Latinos account for 3.5% of enrolled students, a number that grows exponentially each year. Currently, the NCCCS is continuing to operate under its latest affirmed policy, 23 N.C.A.C 02C .0301 "Admission to Colleges, by allowing undocumented students admission to North Carolina community colleges, upon passing the Rules and Review Commission and if the student: "is a graduate of a United States high school, pays out-of-state tuition, and does not displace a North Carolina or U.S. citizen."

Regarding North Carolina public universities, the University of North Carolina (UNC) system has adopted a policy similar to that of North Carolina's community colleges. It is the policy of the UNC system to allow all undocumented students to be considered for admission, and prohibits any school from approving any individual policies that would bar access for these students." The UNC system requires that such students "must be graduates of high schools in the United States, are treated as out-of-state students for admissions purposes, and must pay out-of-state tuition rates."

== Comparative policies: other states ==
=== Tuition equity laws and policy categories ===
Many states have adopted tuition equity laws in an effort to improve access to education for all students. Generally, most tuition equity laws require that undocumented students attend and graduate high school within the state, and meet certain academic criteria, in order to pay-in-state tuition rates. States with tuition equity laws qualify as Type 1 or the "access/low-cost" category. The NCCCS provides a statement on the related issues of adopting Type 1 policies. In Type 1 states there are no requirements to submit documentation of immigration status; the same qualifying criteria apply to all students, regarding how long the applicant has maintained residence within the state. These Type 1 states include California, Illinois, New Mexico, New York, and Texas. Type 1 policies increase the access to education, resulting in a more educated workforce, higher tax revenues, and a decrease in spending on social welfare programs and police. However, these Type 1 policies augment the burden on taxpayers, and the tuition standard would likely have to increase in North Carolina to afford expenditures of increased enrollment.

Type 2 states provide access with a higher cost (included in the study were Arizona, Colorado, Florida, Georgia, and Virginia). Here, undocumented students may be admitted, but are not afforded the option of in-state-tuition rates. In North Carolina, adopting Type 2 policies would have a "modest" impact on enrollment, with a reciprocally modest impact on an educated populace, tax revenues, and welfare and law enforcement spending. Implementation of Type 2 policies in North Carolina would require a uniform verification standard for admitted students, for which North Carolina colleges would incur costs. However, the taxpayer burden would decrease, if admitted undocumented students paid out-of-state tuition.

Type 3 states (represented by South Carolina in the NCCCS study) provide no access—denying all undocumented students access to post-secondary education. The study indicates that "no access" states have lower rates of high school completion, translating to lower tax revenues and salaries, and increased spending for social programming and law enforcement. However, Type 3 states carry a largely reduced risk of litigation over education policies.

=== North Carolina: implications as a Type 3 state ===
For North Carolina to adopt a Type 3 policy, as NCHB 11 advocates, the benefits and disadvantages could differ significantly. Because the NCCCS currently uses an "open-door" policy to education, such legislation would require substantial regulatory changes to amend and clarify the new admission policy. If North Carolina were not able to sufficiently clarify its mission, the state could incur an increased risk of legal challenges, as it would violate its existing policy. Another issue to consider is the major policy shift in North Carolina education policy. With its current access policy (legal admission to post-secondary schools at a higher cost of tuition for undocumented students) North Carolina is accustomed to certain benefits associated with an educated labor force, lower crime rates, and increased tax revenues. The state has an interest in maintaining these benefits and minimizing any costs incurred by allowing undocumented students admission to its institutions of higher education.

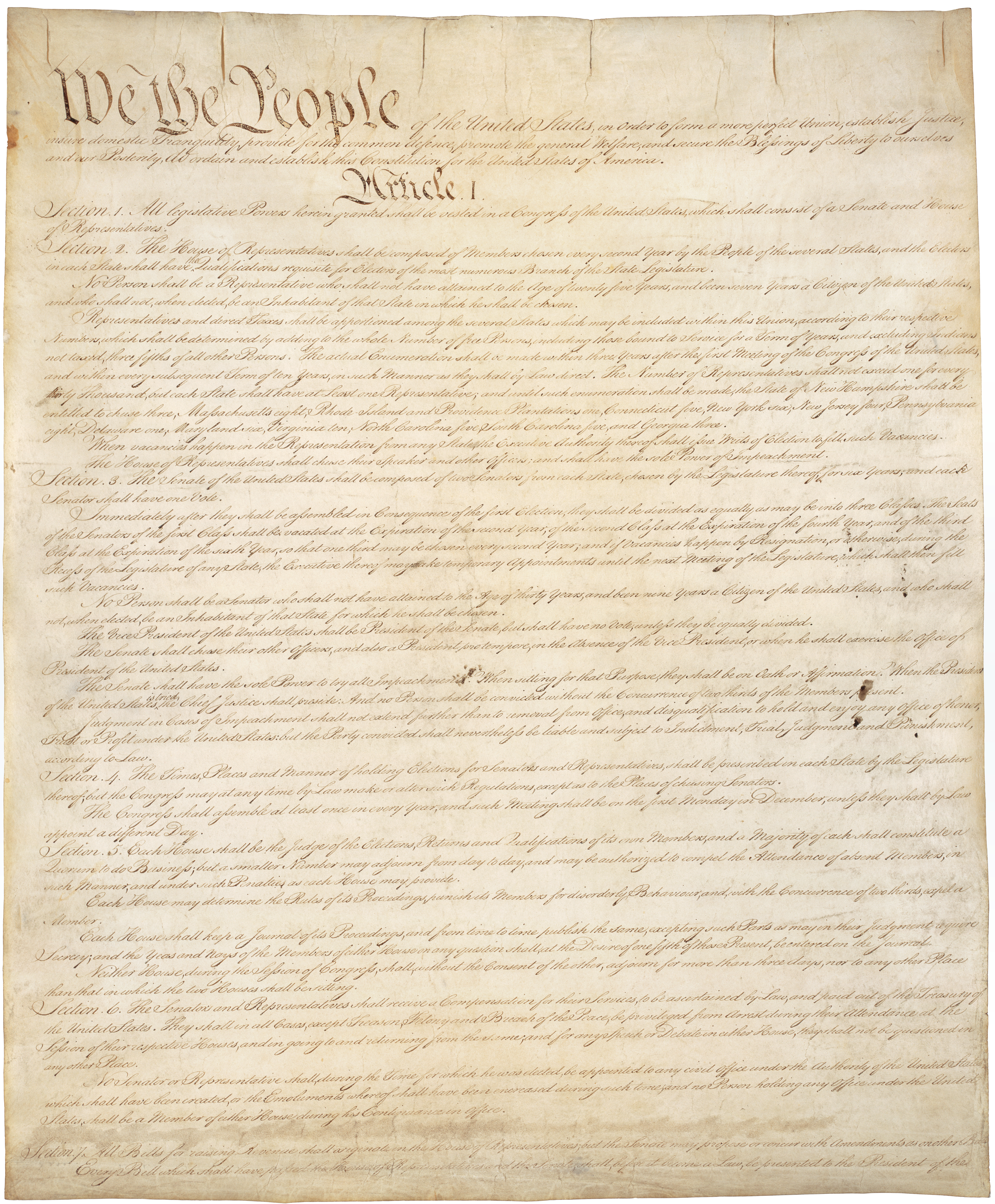
The Constitution Party of North Carolina adheres to strict constitutional beliefs, conservative social values, and the foundational ideal of a limited government. This organization is recognized as a leading supporter of NC House Bill 11

== In support of NCHB 11 ==
Support for NCHB 11 stems mainly from House Republicans. Republican Representative George Cleveland gained the support of nineteen Republican co-sponsors, and several similar sentiments from other North Carolina House Republicans.

Among interest groups supporting the legislation is the Constitution Party of North Carolina. This group is founded on strict constitutional beliefs, conservative social values, and the foundational ideal of limited government. This group has publicly voiced its support of NCHB 11 and encouraged its affiliates to express that support to the North Carolina General Assembly. The Constitution Party of North Carolina believes that the passage of this bill, by denying undocumented students access to post-secondary education, will restore the constitutional foundations from which the nation and the state of North Carolina have strayed.

At the forefront of anti-illegal immigration rallying is Americans for Legal Immigration Political Action Committee (ALIPAC). William Gheen is the leader of ALIPAC, and says his organization aims to defend border security, fight for stricter immigration enforcement, and to defend against illegal immigration and amnesty. ALIPAC is a well-known force on the federal front of the immigration policy debate, but Gheen has directed his support to North Carolina, urging them to pass NCHB 11.

== Opposition to NCHB 11 ==
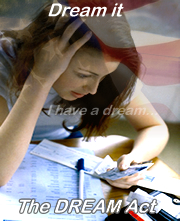
The DREAM Act (Development Relief and Education for Alien Minors) aimed to provide a path to college or university education, military enlistment, and eventual citizenship for undocumented youth that met certain criteria. Though the DREAM Act did not pass, several organizations were inspired by its movement, such as the NC DREAM Team.

Several student groups and nonprofit organizations have been active and vocal since NCHB 11 was introduced. The NC DREAM Team is a group of immigrant student youth and their allies committed to immigrants' rights in North Carolina. NC DREAM Team is a part of the Adelante Student Coalition, which aims to ensure K-12 and post-secondary education for all students. The NC DREAM Team's philosophy for educational reform is built upon the foundations of the DREAM Act (Development Relief and Education for Alien Minors). The DREAM Act was a federal piece of legislation that failed in 2010. The DREAM Act aimed to provide a path to college or university education, military enlistment, and eventual citizenship for undocumented youth that were able to meet a very specific list of criteria regarding residency, completed education and good moral character.

Also in opposition to NCHB 11 is the American Civil Liberties Union (ACLU) of North Carolina.The ACLU worries that NCHB 11 will open the door to racial profiling and discrimination, and that it places an undue burden on undocumented students seeking post-secondary education. Referencing the Equal Protection Clause of the Fourteenth Amendment to the United States Constitution, the ACLU argues that the amendment protects individuals such as undocumented students from discrimination in the education arena. They also point to the 1982 U.S. Supreme Court decision in Plyler v. Doe, quoting that "education prepares individuals to become self-reliant and self-sufficient participants in society. The ACLU maintains that the disadvantage to undocumented students is "bad fiscal and social policy," quoting a report by the State Board of Community Colleges, which found that the NCCCS makes $1,650 from every undocumented student currently paying out-of-state tuition to attend North Carolina community colleges. They have asked legislators to vote against NHB11, and encouraged other citizens to oppose the passage of the bill as well.

== Implications for the future of education in North Carolina ==
As evidenced above, the debate over North Carolina's education policy for undocumented students has been heated and arduous. Throughout the United States, a variety of policies are being adopted, implemented, and amended. North Carolina torn between its interests in maintaining a consistent and efficient policy on education, balanced against the state's social, political, and economic welfare. North Carolina House Bill 11 is the most recent policy initiative concerning the education of undocumented students. While the bill remains in committee, when aligned with the issue's legislative history in the state, its mere introduction signals yet another shift in philosophy in North Carolina.

== See also ==
- North Carolina Community College System policy on admission of undocumented students

== Reference List ==
- Assembly of North Carolina Session 2011: House Bill 11 "General Assembly of North Carolina Session 2011: House Bill 11".
- US Census Bureau (2010). "2010 Census Interactive Population Search". Archived from the original on June 14, 2012.
- Migration Policy Institute. "North Carolina Social and Demographic Characteristics". Archived from the original on April 16, 2012.
- North Carolina General Assembly (April 12, 2005). "General Assembly of North Carolina Session 2005: House Bill 1183" (PDF). Archived (PDF) from the original on January 26, 2012.
- Lee, John B. / Frishberg2, Ellen2 / Shkodriani3, Gina M.3 / Freeman4, Stanley A.4 / Maginnis5, Alice M.5 / Bob6, Sharon H.6 (April 16, 2009). "Study on the Admission of Undocumented Students into the North Carolina Community College System" (PDF). Archived from the original (PDF) on June 4, 2012.
- Oseguera, Leticia; Flores, Stella M.; Burciaga, Edelina (2010). "Documenting Implementation Realities: Undocumented Immigrant Students in California and North Carolina" (PDF). Journal of College Admission (Winter 2010). National Association for College Admissions Counseling: 37–43. Archived from the original (PDF) on March 3, 2016.
- Dr. R. Scott Ralls (March 19, 2010). "NCCCS Press Release" (PDF). Archived from the original (PDF) on March 24, 2012.
- National Immigration Law Center (April 17, 2012). "State Bills on Access to Education for Immigrants 2012". Archived from the original on May 2, 2012.
- The Constitution Party of North Carolina. "The Constitution Party of North Carolina". Archived from the original on February 7, 2012.
- William Gheen. "Americans for Legal Immigration Political Action Committee". Archived from the original on April 16, 2012.
- NC DREAM Team. "Mission and Vision, NC DREAM Team". Archived from the original on April 14, 2012.
- Dream Act Portal (July 16, 2010). "Basic Information About the DREAM Act Legislation". Archived from the original on April 15, 2012.
- American Civil Liberties Union of North Carolina. "Statement in Opposition to NC HB11: No Postsecondary Education/Illegal Aliens" (PDF). Archived from the original (PDF) on December 12, 2011.
