= North Carolina's 113th House district =

American legislative district

North Carolina's 113th State House of Representatives district
Representative
| Jake Johnson; R–Saluda |
- Demographics: 81% White; 6% Black; 8% Hispanic; 1% Asian; 3% Multiracial
- Population (2024): 91,984

North Carolina's 113th House district is one of 120 districts in the North Carolina House of Representatives. It has been represented by Republican Jake Johnson since 2019.

== Geography ==
Since 2023, the district has included all of Polk County, as well as parts of Henderson, Rutherford, and McDowell counties. The district overlaps with the 46th and 48th Senate districts.

== District officeholders since 2003 ==
| Representative | Party | Dates | Notes | Counties |
|---|---|---|---|---|
| District created January 1, 2003. | | | | 2003–2005; All of Polk County. Parts of Transylvania and Henderson counties. |
| Trudi Walend (Brevard) | Republican | January 1, 2003 – January 1, 2009 | Redistricted from the 68th district. Retired. | 2003–2005; All of Polk County. Parts of Transylvania and Henderson counties. |
| Trudi Walend (Brevard) | Republican | January 1, 2003 – January 1, 2009 | Redistricted from the 68th district. Retired. | 2005–2023; All of Polk and Transylvania counties. Part of Henderson County. |
| David Guice (Brevard) | Republican | January 1, 2009 – January 1, 2012 | Resigned. | 2005–2023; All of Polk and Transylvania counties. Part of Henderson County. |
| Vacant | | January 1, 2012 – January 4, 2012 | | 2005–2023; All of Polk and Transylvania counties. Part of Henderson County. |
| Trudi Walend (Brevard) | Republican | January 4, 2012 – January 1, 2013 | Appointed to finish Guice's term. Lost re-nomination. | 2005–2023; All of Polk and Transylvania counties. Part of Henderson County. |
| Chris Whitmire (Brevard) | Republican | January 1, 2013 – January 1, 2017 | Retired. | 2005–2023; All of Polk and Transylvania counties. Part of Henderson County. |
| Cody Henson (Rosman) | Republican | January 1, 2017 – July 24, 2019 | Resigned. | 2005–2023; All of Polk and Transylvania counties. Part of Henderson County. |
| Vacant | | July 24, 2019 – August 6, 2019 | | 2005–2023; All of Polk and Transylvania counties. Part of Henderson County. |
| Jake Johnson (Saluda) | Republican | August 6, 2019 – Present | Appointed to finish Henson's term. | 2005–2023; All of Polk and Transylvania counties. Part of Henderson County. |
| Jake Johnson (Saluda) | Republican | August 6, 2019 – Present | Appointed to finish Henson's term. | 2023–Present; All of Polk County. Parts of Henderson, Rutherford, and McDowell counties. |

== Election results ==
=== 2026 ===
North Carolina House of Representatives 113th district Republican primary election, 2026
| Party | Candidate | Votes | % |
|---|---|---|---|
| Republican | Jake Johnson (incumbent) | 7,341 | 61.04% |
| Republican | Mike Hager | 4,685 | 38.96% |
| Total votes | | 12,026 | 100% |

North Carolina House of Representatives 113th district general election, 2026
| Party | Candidate | Votes | % |
|---|---|---|---|
| Republican | Jake Johnson (incumbent) | | |
| Democratic | Mason Rhodes | | |
| Total votes | | | 100% |

=== 2024 ===
North Carolina House of Representatives 113th district general election, 2024
| Party | Candidate | Votes | % |
|---|---|---|---|
| Republican | Jake Johnson (incumbent) | 34,467 | 66.68% |
| Democratic | Michelle Antalec | 17,223 | 33.32% |
| Total votes | | 51,690 | 100% |
| Republican hold | | | |

=== 2022 ===
North Carolina House of Representatives 113th district Republican primary election, 2022
| Party | Candidate | Votes | % |
|---|---|---|---|
| Republican | Jake Johnson (incumbent) | 7,585 | 65.08% |
| Republican | David Rogers (incumbent) | 4,069 | 34.92% |
| Total votes | | 11,654 | 100% |

North Carolina House of Representatives 113th district general election, 2022
| Party | Candidate | Votes | % |
|---|---|---|---|
| Republican | Jake Johnson (incumbent) | 27,267 | 100% |
| Total votes | | 27,267 | 100% |
| Republican hold | | | |

=== 2020 ===
North Carolina House of Representatives 113th district general election, 2020
| Party | Candidate | Votes | % |
|---|---|---|---|
| Republican | Jake Johnson (incumbent) | 30,367 | 59.59% |
| Democratic | Sam Edney | 20,596 | 40.41% |
| Total votes | | 50,963 | 100% |
| Republican hold | | | |

=== 2018 ===
North Carolina House of Representatives 113th district general election, 2018
| Party | Candidate | Votes | % |
|---|---|---|---|
| Republican | Cody Henson (incumbent) | 22,407 | 57.52% |
| Democratic | Sam Edney | 16,551 | 42.48% |
| Total votes | | 38,958 | 100% |
| Republican hold | | | |

=== 2016 ===
North Carolina House of Representatives 113th district Republican Primary election, 2016
| Party | Candidate | Votes | % |
|---|---|---|---|
| Republican | Cody Henson | 7,718 | 64.69% |
| Republican | Coty James Ferguson | 4,212 | 35.31% |
| Total votes | | 11,930 | 100% |

North Carolina House of Representatives 113th district general election, 2016
| Party | Candidate | Votes | % |
|---|---|---|---|
| Republican | Cody Henson | 26,848 | 61.61% |
| Democratic | Maureen Mahan Copelof | 16,726 | 38.39% |
| Total votes | | 43,574 | 100% |
| Republican hold | | | |

=== 2014 ===
North Carolina House of Representatives 113th district general election, 2014
| Party | Candidate | Votes | % |
|---|---|---|---|
| Republican | Chris Whitmire (incumbent) | 19,594 | 63.26% |
| Democratic | Norm Bossert | 11,379 | 36.74% |
| Total votes | | 30,973 | 100% |
| Republican hold | | | |

=== 2012 ===
North Carolina House of Representatives 113th district Republican Primary election, 2012
| Party | Candidate | Votes | % |
|---|---|---|---|
| Republican | Chris Whitmire | 6,448 | 51.11% |
| Republican | Trudi Walend (incumbent) | 6,169 | 48.89% |
| Total votes | | 12,617 | 100% |

North Carolina House of Representatives 113th district general election, 2012
| Party | Candidate | Votes | % |
|---|---|---|---|
| Republican | Chris Whitmire | 25,663 | 63.03% |
| Democratic | George Alley | 15,055 | 36.97% |
| Total votes | | 40,718 | 100% |
| Republican hold | | | |

=== 2010 ===
North Carolina House of Representatives 113th district general election, 2010
| Party | Candidate | Votes | % |
|---|---|---|---|
| Republican | David Guice (incumbent) | 19,641 | 100% |
| Total votes | | 19,641 | 100% |
| Republican hold | | | |

=== 2008 ===
North Carolina House of Representatives 113th district general election, 2008
| Party | Candidate | Votes | % |
|---|---|---|---|
| Republican | David Guice | 19,122 | 50.72% |
| Democratic | Tom Thomas | 18,579 | 49.28% |
| Total votes | | 37,701 | 100% |
| Republican hold | | | |

=== 2006 ===
North Carolina House of Representatives 113th district general election, 2006
| Party | Candidate | Votes | % |
|---|---|---|---|
| Republican | Trudi Walend (incumbent) | 19,026 | 100% |
| Total votes | | 19,026 | 100% |
| Republican hold | | | |

=== 2004 ===
North Carolina House of Representatives 113th district general election, 2004
| Party | Candidate | Votes | % |
|---|---|---|---|
| Republican | Trudi Walend (incumbent) | 24,016 | 100% |
| Total votes | | 24,016 | 100% |
| Republican hold | | | |

=== 2002 ===
North Carolina House of Representatives 113th district general election, 2002
| Party | Candidate | Votes | % |
|---|---|---|---|
| Republican | Trudi Walend (incumbent) | 17,472 | 83.96% |
| Libertarian | Jean Marlowe | 3,338 | 16.04% |
| Total votes | | 20,810 | 100% |
| Republican hold | | | |
