= North Carolina's 112th House district =

American legislative district

North Carolina's 112th State House of Representatives district
Representative
Jordan Lopez; D–Charlotte
- Demographics: 19% White; 45% Black; 29% Hispanic; 4% Asian; 1% Other; 2% Multiracial
- Population (2024): 94,885

North Carolina's 112th House district is one of 120 districts in the North Carolina House of Representatives. It has been represented by Democrat Jordan Lopez since 2025.

== Geography ==
Since 2023, the district has included part of Mecklenburg County. The district overlaps with the 40th Senate district.

== District officeholders since 2003 ==
Representative	Party	Dates	Notes	Counties
District created January 1, 2003.				2003–2013; All of Rutherford County. Part of Cleveland County.
Bob England (Ellenboro)	Democratic	January 1, 2003 – January 1, 2011	Retired.	2003–2013; All of Rutherford County. Part of Cleveland County.
Mike Hager (Rutherfordton)	Republican	January 1, 2011 – August 16, 2016	Resigned.	2003–2013; All of Rutherford County. Part of Cleveland County.
Mike Hager (Rutherfordton)	Republican	January 1, 2011 – August 16, 2016	Resigned.	2013–2023; All of Rutherford County. Part of Burke County.
Vacant		August 16, 2016 – August 19, 2016		2013–2023; All of Rutherford County. Part of Burke County.
David Rogers (Rutherfordton)	Republican	August 19, 2016 – January 1, 2023	Appointed to finish Hager's term. Redistricted to the 113th district and lost re-nomination.	2013–2023; All of Rutherford County. Part of Burke County.
Tricia Cotham (Mint Hill)	Democratic	January 1, 2023 – April 4, 2023	Switched parties. Redistricted to the 105th district.	2023–Present; Part of Mecklenburg County.
Tricia Cotham (Mint Hill)	Republican	April 4, 2023 – January 1, 2025	Switched parties. Redistricted to the 105th district.	2023–Present; Part of Mecklenburg County.
Jordan Lopez (Charlotte)	Democratic	January 1, 2025 – Present		2023–Present; Part of Mecklenburg County.

== Election results ==
=== 2024 ===
North Carolina House of Representatives 112th district general election, 2024
Party	Candidate	Votes	%
Democratic	Jordan Lopez	32,721	100%
Total votes		32,721	100%
Democratic win (new seat)			

(Note: Previous incumbent Tricia Cotham was redistricted to the 105th district.)

=== 2022 ===
North Carolina House of Representatives 112th district Democratic primary election, 2022
Party	Candidate	Votes	%
Democratic	Tricia Cotham	2,385	47.81%
Democratic	Yolanda Holmes	1,559	31.25%
Democratic	Jay Holman	853	17.10%
Democratic	Rodney Moore	192	3.85%
Total votes		4,989	100%

North Carolina House of Representatives 112th district general election, 2022
Party	Candidate	Votes	%
Democratic	Tricia Cotham	15,389	59.22%
Republican	Tony Long	10,597	40.78%
Total votes		25,986	100%
Democratic win (new seat)			

(Note: Previous incumbent David Rogers was redistricted to the 113th district.)

=== 2020 ===
North Carolina House of Representatives 112th district general election, 2020
Party	Candidate	Votes	%
Republican	David Rogers (incumbent)	28,059	73.90%
Democratic	Ed Hallyburton	9,836	25.90%
Write-in		50	0.13%
Independent	Darren Joiner (Write-In)	25	0.07%
Total votes		37,970	100%
Republican hold			

=== 2018 ===
North Carolina House of Representatives 112th district general election, 2018
Party	Candidate	Votes	%
Republican	David Rogers (incumbent)	18,155	70.94%
Democratic	Gregory James Gallagher	7,436	29.06%
Total votes		25,591	100%
Republican hold			

=== 2016 ===
North Carolina House of Representatives 112th district general election, 2016
Party	Candidate	Votes	%
Republican	David Rogers (incumbent)	22,938	70.96%
Independent	Ben Edwards	9,388	29.04%
Total votes		32,326	100%
Republican hold			

=== 2014 ===
North Carolina House of Representatives 112th district general election, 2014
Party	Candidate	Votes	%
Republican	Mike Hager (incumbent)	12,722	58.58%
Democratic	Lisa Harris Bralley	8,997	41.42%
Total votes		21,719	100%
Republican hold			

=== 2012 ===
North Carolina House of Representatives 112th district general election, 2012
Party	Candidate	Votes	%
Republican	Mike Hager (incumbent)	19,593	61.90%
Democratic	Mark Brown	12,059	38.10%
Total votes		31,652	100%
Republican hold			

=== 2010 ===
North Carolina House of Representatives 112th district Republican primary election, 2010
Party	Candidate	Votes	%
Republican	Mike Hager	1,515	43.82%
Republican	Alan Toney	843	24.39%
Republican	Dennis Davis	791	22.88%
Republican	Jim Wayne Newton	308	8.91%
Total votes		3,457	100%

North Carolina House of Representatives 112th district general election, 2010
Party	Candidate	Votes	%
Republican	Mike Hager	13,486	65.18%
Democratic	Jim Proctor	7,203	34.82%
Total votes		20,689	100%
Republican gain from Democratic			

=== 2008 ===
North Carolina House of Representatives 112th district general election, 2008
Party	Candidate	Votes	%
Democratic	Bob England (incumbent)	23,362	100%
Total votes		23,362	100%
Democratic hold			

=== 2006 ===
North Carolina House of Representatives 112th district general election, 2006
Party	Candidate	Votes	%
Democratic	Bob England (incumbent)	14,169	70.62%
Republican	David L. Reno	5,894	29.38%
Total votes		20,063	100%
Democratic hold			

=== 2004 ===
North Carolina House of Representatives 112th district general election, 2004
Party	Candidate	Votes	%
Democratic	Bob England (incumbent)	16,681	61.19%
Republican	Mike Hager	10,171	37.31%
Libertarian	Ralph Haulk	408	1.50%
Total votes		27,260	100%
Democratic hold			

=== 2002 ===
North Carolina House of Representatives 112th district Democratic primary election, 2002
Party	Candidate	Votes	%
Democratic	Bob England	3,996	72.26%
Democratic	Kenneth Hankinson	1,534	27.74%
Total votes		5,530	100%

North Carolina House of Representatives 112th district general election, 2002
Party	Candidate	Votes	%
Democratic	Bob England	11,215	57.90%
Republican	David Rogers	7,817	40.36%
Libertarian	Ralph Haulk	338	1.74%
Total votes		19,370	100%
Democratic win (new seat)			
