= David Rogers (North Carolina politician) =

American politician

Representative David Rogers
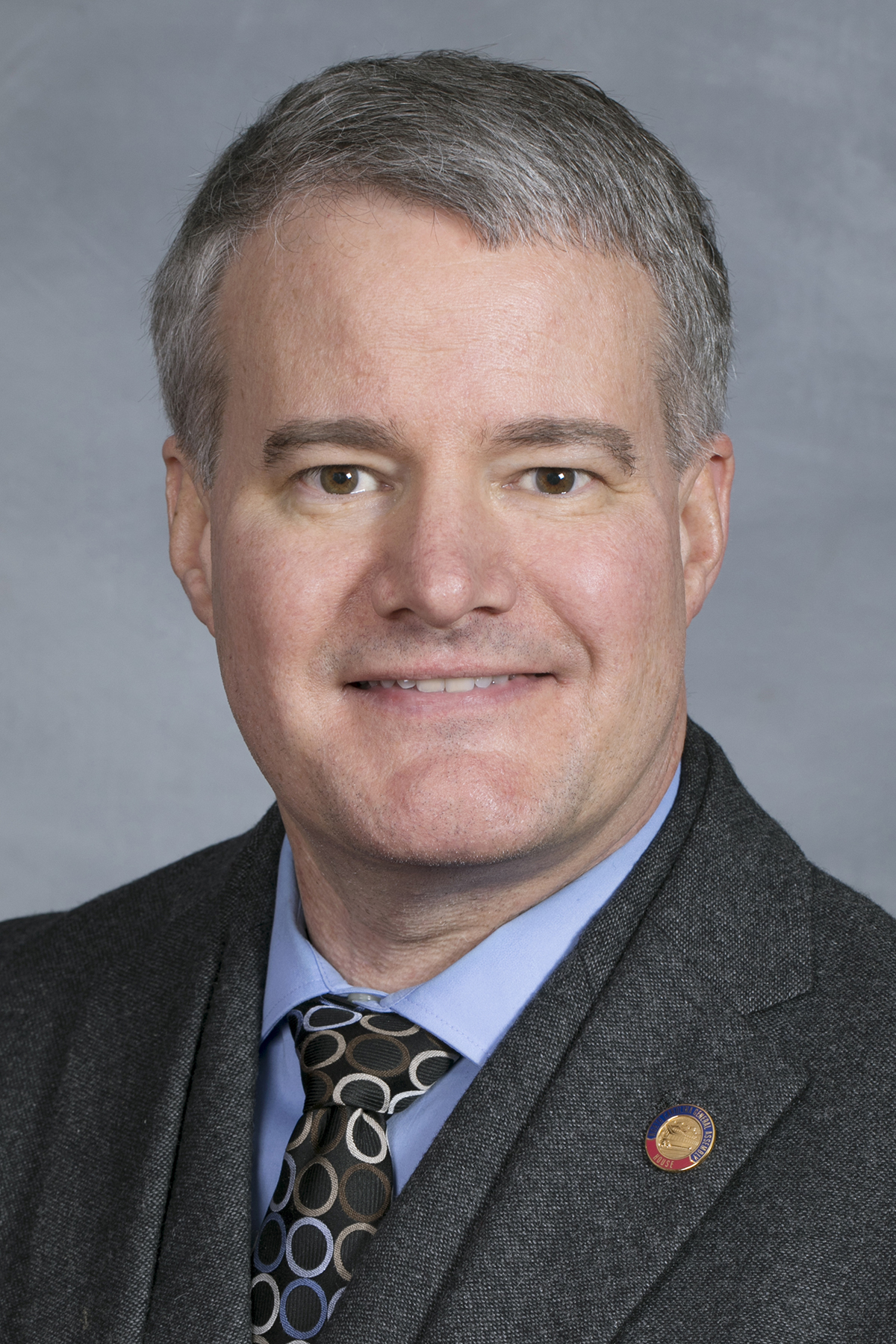

Member of the North Carolina House of Representatives from the 112th district
- In office August 19, 2016 – January 1, 2023
- Preceded by: Mike Hager
- Succeeded by: Jake Johnson (Redistricting)

Personal details
- Born: David William Rogers; July 1, 1965 (age 61) Cleveland, Ohio, U.S.
- Party: Republican
- Education: Oral Roberts University (BS); University of Tulsa (JD)
- Occupation: Attorney

David William Rogers (born July 1, 1965) is an American politician from the state of North Carolina. He is a former Republican member of the North Carolina House of Representatives, who represented the 112th district (including constituents in Rutherford and Burke counties) from 2016 to 2023. He was first appointed to the chamber in August 2016.

Rogers is listed as one of the most conservative members of the North Carolina legislature. Rogers is an attorney, and was admitted to the North Carolina Bar in 1991. He earned his JD from the University of Tulsa and his BS from Oral Roberts University.

== Electoral history ==
=== 2022 ===
North Carolina House of Representatives 113th district Republican primary election, 2022
Party	Candidate	Votes	%
Republican	Jake Johnson (incumbent)	7,585	65.08%
Republican	David Rogers (incumbent)	4,069	34.92%
Total votes		11,654	100%

=== 2020 ===
North Carolina House of Representatives 112th district general election, 2020
Party	Candidate	Votes	%
Republican	David Rogers (incumbent)	28,059	73.90%
Democratic	Ed Hallyburton	9,836	25.90%
Write-in		50	0.13%
Unaffaliated	Darren Joiner (Write-In)	25	0.07%
Total votes		37,970	100%
Republican hold			

=== 2018 ===
North Carolina House of Representatives 112th district general election, 2018
Party	Candidate	Votes	%
Republican	David Rogers (incumbent)	18,155	70.94%
Democratic	Gregory James Gallagher	7,436	29.06%
Total votes		25,591	100%
Republican hold			

=== 2016 ===
North Carolina House of Representatives 112th district general election, 2016
Party	Candidate	Votes	%
Republican	David Rogers (incumbent)	22,938	70.96%
Unaffaliated	Ben Edwards	9,388	29.04%
Total votes		32,326	100%
Republican hold			

=== 2002 ===
North Carolina House of Representatives 112th district general election, 2002
Party	Candidate	Votes	%
Democratic	Bob England	11,215	57.90%
Republican	David Rogers	7,817	40.36%
Libertarian	Ralph Haulk	338	1.74%
Total votes		19,370	100%
Democratic win (new seat)			

== Committee assignments ==
=== 2021-2022 session ===
- Appropriations
- Appropriations - Justice and Public Safety (Vice Chair)
- Judiciary III (Chair)
- Wildlife Resources
- Election Law and Campaign Finance Reform
- Marine Resources and Aqua Culture
- Redistricting

=== 2019-2020 session ===
- Appropriations
- Appropriations - Justice and Public Safety
- Judiciary (Vice Chair)
- Homeland Security, Military, and Veterans Affairs
- Health
- Wildlife Resources

=== 2017-2018 session ===
- Appropriations
- Appropriations - Capital
- Appropriations - Justice and Public Safety
- Judiciary I
- Education - K-12
- Energy and Public Utilities
- Health

North Carolina House of Representatives
Preceded by Mike Hager	Member of the North Carolina House of Representatives from the 112th district 2016–2023	Succeeded by Tricia Cotham
