= North Carolina Community College System policy on admission of undocumented students =

The North Carolina Community College System (NCCCS) is the governing body for North Carolina's 58 public community colleges and has been empowered by the state of North Carolina to "adopt all policies, regulations and standards it may deem necessary for operation of the System" by the North Carolina General Assembly. On March 19, 2010, the State Board of Community Colleges approved policy 23 N.C.A.C. 02C .0301 entitled "Admission to Colleges". The State Board has been researching and amending the policy for a decade now and it was implemented on July 10, 2010, after completing the full amendment process. The Admission to Colleges policy states "undocumented immigrants can enter the system's 58 community colleges if they are a graduate of a United States high school, pay out-of-state tuition, and do not displace a North Carolina or United States citizen"

According to a research study completed by JBL Associates, Inc., and Powers, Pyles, Sutter & Verville PC, undocumented students are "those students who are non-United States citizens and do not hold a valid visa or other recognized immigration status authorizing them to be lawfully present in the United States". Each state has a different policy such as admitting undocumented students or not admitting them at all.

== Background history ==
On August 22, 1996, the Personal Responsibility and Work Opportunity Reconciliation Act of 1996 was enacted by congress followed closely by the Illegal Immigration Reform and Immigrant Responsibility Act of 1996 (IIRIRA) on September 30, 1996. These policies transformed the United States immigration laws that existed before the act was passed. The Personal Responsibility and Work Opportunity Reconciliation Act of 1996 denied all state and federal benefits to those who are not qualified aliens. Qualified aliens are those who are:

... lawfully admitted for permanent residence under the Immigration and Nationality Act, an alien who is granted asylum under section 208 of such Act, a refugee who is admitted to the United States under section 207 of such Act, an alien who is paroled into the United States under section 212(d)(5) of such Act for a period of at least 1 year, an alien whose deportation is being withheld under section 243(h) of such Act, or, an alien who is granted conditional entry pursuant to section 203(a)(7) of such Act as in effect prior to April 1, 1980.

The Illegal Immigration Reform and Immigrant Responsibility Act of 1996 was introduced to improve border protection and enhance penalties against smugglers and employers of undocumented aliens. It also set the basis for states to implement their own laws to either allow or deny undocumented students admission into their schools. Section 505(a) of the IIRIRA states:

Notwithstanding any other provision of law, an alien who is not lawfully present in the United States shall not be eligible on the basis of residence within a State (or a political subdivision) for any postsecondary education benefit unless a citizen or national of the United States is eligible for such a benefit (in no less an amount, duration, and scope) without regard to whether the citizen or national is such a resident.

After these federal laws were passed, the North Carolina Community College System board met, discussed, and implemented their first policy on undocumented students in North Carolina community colleges. This first policy implemented on December 21, 2001, stated "undocumented students could be admitted to community colleges only if they were: (1) In high school and enrolling in college-level courses; (2) Enrolling in non-college-level courses or programs (such as GED preparation courses); or (3) Determined to meet other qualifying conditions set forth under Federal law". The only way an undocumented student could enroll in a North Carolina Community College is if they met one of three criteria listed and they paid out-of-state tuition. They were not permitted to enroll for purposes of post-secondary education.

Almost two years later, the board met to discuss and implement their second policy regarding undocumented students on August 13, 2004. This policy gave each individual North Carolina community college the discretion to choose to enroll undocumented students or deny them. This second policy "permitted the enrollment of undocumented non-immigrant applicants to curriculum, continuing education, and basic skills programs and required qualifying undocumented non-immigrants to pay out-of-state tuition

Three years later, on November 7, 2007, the board issued a third memorandum stating "All colleges are to maintain an open-door admission policy to all applicants who are high school graduates or who are at least 18 years of age". The downside to this new policy is that undocumented students are to continue to pay out-of-state tuition. This new policy concerned NCCCS board members and so they sent a letter to the North Carolina Attorney General. In this letter the NCCCS is asking if their policy allowing undocumented students into North Carolina's Community Colleges is in compliance with Federal and State law. In response to the NCCCS's letter, the North Carolina Attorney General's office advised the board to return to their December 21, 2001, policy because it "would more likely withstand judicial scrutiny". Governor Mike Easley on the other hand suggested the NCCCS Board to continue their current policy since there is no federal policy. In response to Governor Easley's suggestion, the board replied to the Attorney General asking them to seek federal advice from The Department of Homeland Security.

While awaiting response from Homeland Security, the NCCCS board issued a fourth memo on May 13, 2008, stating:

... colleges should admit or enroll undocumented or illegal aliens only as follows: Undocumented or illegal aliens who are high school students may enroll in college level courses, Undocumented or illegal aliens may enroll in non-college level courses or programs including GED preparation courses, Adult Basic Education, Adult High School, English as a Second Language and other continuing education courses less than college level, and/or Undocumented or battered illegal aliens who have been determined to meet one of the qualifying conditions set forth in Federal Law, 8 USC Section 1641.

This policy was intended to be a temporary policy until the board could find out what would be best for them and the state of North Carolina.

== Policy agenda setting ==
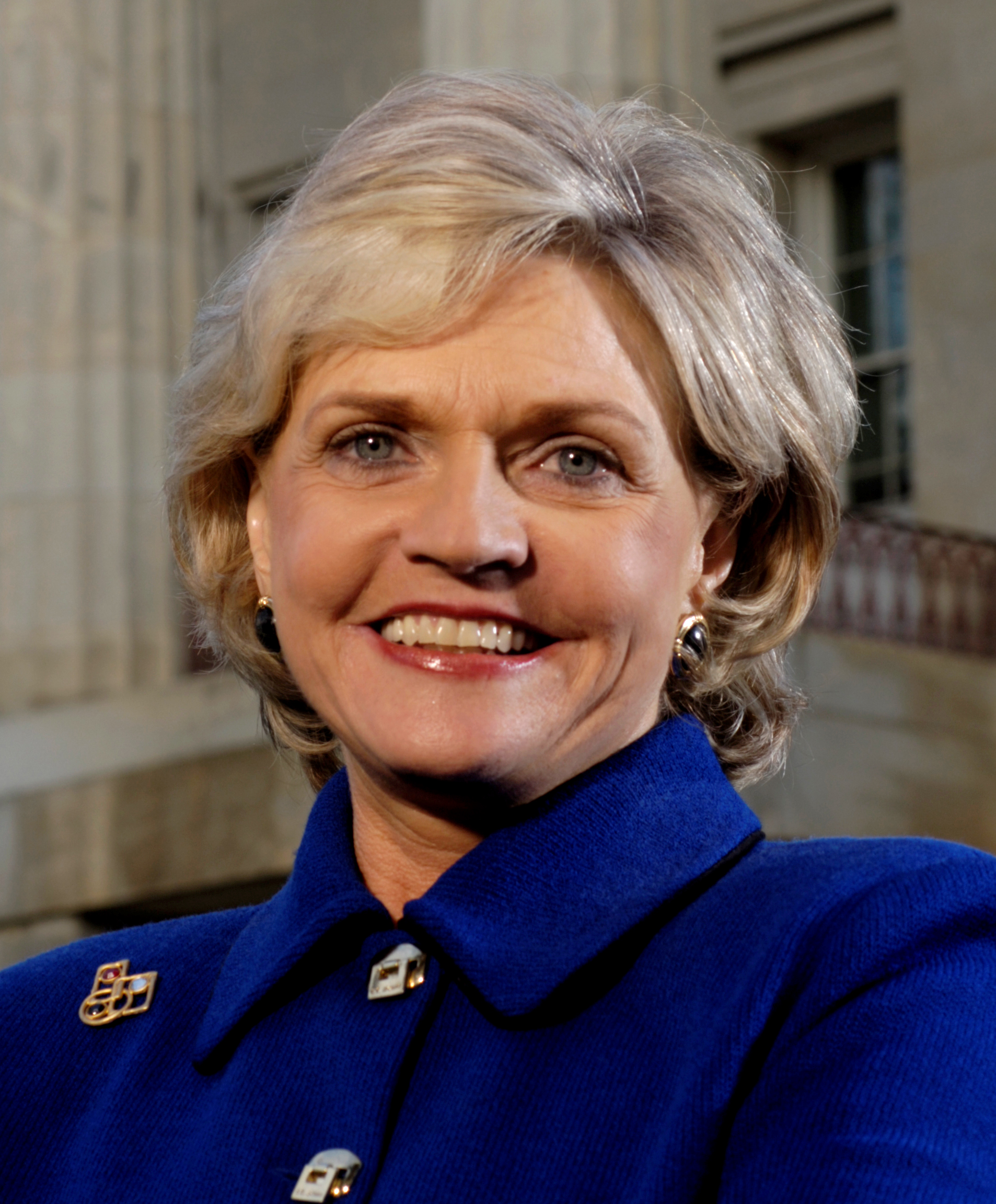
Lieutenant Governor Bev Perdue

Worried about public and judicial scrutiny, General Counsel Q. Shante Martin asked the North Carolina Attorney General on May 9, 2008, to consult the Secretary of the Department of Homeland Security for guidance "on the issue of the admission of undocumented or illegal aliens to local community colleges when state law does not affirmatively provide for such eligibility". The North Carolina Attorney General's office requested clarification on May 28, 2008, and the Department of Homeland Security responded on July 9, 2008, stating

The admissions to public post-secondary educational institutions is not one of the benefits regulated by the Illegal Immigration Reform and Immigrant Responsibility Act of 1996 and is not a public benefit under the Personal Responsibility and Work Opportunity Reconciliation Act of 1996. Therefore, the individual states must decide for themselves whether or not to admit illegal aliens into their public post-secondary institutions. States may bar or admit illegal aliens from enrolling in public post-secondary institutions either as a matter of policy or through legislation.

With this in mind, the NCCCS board was still not sure on how they should formulate their next policy. They questioned themselves about whether or not they should bar all undocumented students from entering the post-secondary schools or allow them at the out-of-state tuition rate.

Several different North Carolina key politicians, NCCCS board members, North Carolina Community College Presidents, North Carolina University professors, non-profit entity members, and North Carolina citizens were concerned about the next policy and thus gave their input. These letters are on file for the public to see. There were concerns from Senator Phil Berger (who was the Republican Leader of the North Carolina Senate at the time), then-Lieutenant Governor Bev Perdue, and North Carolina residents asking the NCCCS board to maintain their admission policy prohibiting undocumented students until they figure out a long-term policy. There were also concerns from the chairman from the board of trustees at Isothermal Community College, members from the North Carolina Association of Community College Presidents, members of the North Carolina State University's Business Committee on Higher Education, the president of the North Carolina Association of Educators, the Director of the Hispanic Ministry, the chief executive officer of the Latino American Coalition, and North Carolina residents who were in favor of changing the policy to allow undocumented students into the schools. To determine a long-term policy that best suits the State of North Carolina and its citizens, the Policy Committee for the State Board of Community Colleges decided that the State Board should employ an independent consultant to study issues surrounding the admission of undocumented students into the North Carolina Community College System. The board voted and approved on September 18, 2008, to have a research study completed by an independent consultant with a budget of $75,000.

== Formulation of the policy ==
The research conducted for the North Carolina Community College System was completed by two different research organizations; JBL Associates, Inc. and Powers, Pyles, Sutter & Verville PC. The reasons for this research were to address the issues dealing with the admission of undocumented students and to determine an adequate, long-term policy for the State of North Carolina. In this report, JBL Associates and Powers, Pyles, Sutter & Verville split up the work to complete an analysis of different state policies on the admission of undocumented students in public schools of higher education across the nation and to calculate the local and state resources needed to support a full-time undocumented student. The states researched and surveyed were "Arizona, California, Colorado, Florida, Georgia, Illinois, New Mexico, New York, South Carolina, Texas, and Virginia".

The research Team JBLA-PPSV divided the undocumented students in each researched state into three categories: access/low cost, access/high cost, and no access. States who are access/low cost allow undocumented student to receive in-state tuition based on several factors met. As of 2009, states surveyed that follow this method are California, Illinois, New York, New Mexico, and Texas. To receive in-state tuition in these states, undocumented students must graduate from a state high school, attend a state high school for a specified number of years, or receive their Graduate Equivalence Diploma from the state. These legislative exemptions, exceptions, or changes allow the state to bypass Section 505 of the IIRIRA of 1996 and allow for undocumented students to receive in-state tuition. Following the access/low cost method has its positives and negatives. The positives for North Carolina to use this method are that it will increase access to higher education and decrease verification costs. The negatives are that it could be a burden for tax payers, cause for legislation changes to tuition standards, and potentially be challenged in court.

The next method, access/high cost, allows for any undocumented student to enter into the community college system, but they must pay out-of-state tuition. North Carolina followed this policy from 2004 to 2008, but changed the policy to a "no-admission" policy to allow time for JBLA-PPSV to research more effective methods. States that follow this method are Arizona, Colorado, Florida, Georgia, and Virginia. The positives of this method for North Carolina are that there will not be a tax payer burden, there will be no need to change legislation, and it reduces the risk of legal challenge. The negatives are that if undocumented students cannot afford the tuition, then they will not be going to college and potentially be what Texas Governor Rick Perry describes "a drag on our society". The second negative aspect is that there will be an increase in the SAVE verification process to decide who is here legally and who is not.

The last category to follow is the No Access method. There is only one state that follows this method and that is South Carolina. Even if the undocumented student has graduated from an in-state high school, they are not allowed to enroll at any public school of higher education in the state. The positives of this method for North Carolina are that there is no tax payer burden and that there is low risk of legal challenge. The negatives are that there is no access to higher education for undocumented students, there will be an increase for verification costs for the SAVE program, and a cause for regulatory change for the state.

Team JBLA-PPSV also examined the method the UNC System uses when accessing the admission of undocumented students. The UNC System allows for the admission of undocumented students as long as they graduate from a high school in the United States. If the undocumented student is admitted, then they are treated as out-of-state and will not receive any financial aid in the form of grants or loans. There will be an eighteen percent cap on tuition on all out-of-state freshman and undocumented students cannot be placed into a program where they can receive a professional license. This policy applies to all UNC schools across the state meaning that one school cannot deny undocumented students while the others accept them. To follow the UNC System in the way that they handle undocumented students, the NCCCS would be implementing policy differently from previous practice.

The JBLA-PPSV research team reported to the NCCCS an estimated amount of the cost to attend a community college in North Carolina full-time for in-state students versus out-of-state students in the years 2006–2007. To attend a community college in North Carolina full-time as an in-state student, it would cost an estimated amount of $5,344 per student. If the student is considered out-of-state, then costs would estimate around $7,024 per student. If the NCCCS follows the Access/High Cost method, then the community colleges could earn an estimated $1,680 per out-of-state student in revenue. In the year 2007–2008, there was an estimated number of 112 undocumented students attending school in the North Carolina Community College System. If all 112 undocumented students paid out-of-state tuition, that would be an estimate of $188,160 in revenue for North Carolina Community Colleges. With this research completed, the NCCCS had come to a decision for a new policy that would be long-term.

== Enactment of the policy ==
On March 19, 2010, the North Carolina Community College System enacted their new policy stating "Each college shall maintain an open-door admission policy to all applicants who are legal residents of the United States and who are either high school graduates or are at least 18 years of age". A community college can admit an undocumented student if the student applying attended and graduated from a United States high school that operates in compliance with state or local law. The undocumented student may not receive any state or federal financial aid in the form of a grant or loan and the undocumented student may not be considered as a North Carolina resident for tuition purposes; therefore being charged out-of-state tuition wherever they may live. In deciding to admit an undocumented student, the student cannot enroll in a program that grants them a professional license, which is also prohibited by federal law.

== Legitimization of the policy ==
The legitimization process is defined as "giving legal force to decisions or justifying policy action". This is typical for most organizations and policy makers, but the North Carolina Community College System does not need to hear from the public on the policies they implement. They are the commanding board for the community colleges in North Carolina and the policies they implement can only be challenged by the court system if they are unconstitutional. So far their first four policies have been constitutional and have not broken any laws. This fifth policy that is meant to be long-term was legitimized through a memo delivered to all fifty-eight community colleges stating the terms of admission for undocumented students. Nineteen months have passed and the newest policy has yet to be challenged in court.

== Implementation of the policy ==
The U.S. Department of Homeland Security Seal

After this long-term policy has been formulated, the people want to know who will be carrying it out. As define in Denhardt and Denhardt, implementation is the "set of activities directed toward putting a program into effect". As discussed earlier, the North Carolina Community College System is the governing body of the state's fifty-eight community colleges, not the State of North Carolina. The NCCCS is a non-profit corporation who formulates the policies and implements them in the community colleges while at the same time abiding by the laws of North Carolina. Their purpose as the governing body as stated in the Bylaws is:

... to support the mission of the community college system and to foster and promote the growth, progress, and general welfare of the community college system; to support programs, services and activities of the community college system which promote its mission; to support and promote excellence in administration and instruction throughout the community college system; to foster quality in programs and to encourage research to support long-range planning in the system; to provide an alternative vehicle for contributions of funds to support programs, services, and activities that are not being funded adequately through traditional resources; to broaden the base of the community college system's support; to lend support and prestige to fund raising efforts of the institutions within the system; and to communicate to the public the community college system's mission and responsiveness to local needs.

This policy is being carried out by allowing United States citizens, aliens with correct verification, and those who are undocumented to enter into a North Carolina Community college. What is not allowed is for those students considered to be "out-of-state" entering the community colleges to receive in-state benefits, but how do we know who is in-state and out-of-state without the student lying about where they live? The NCCCS has left this up to each individual fifty-eight institutions to verify the information submitted by each student to distinguish who is in-state and who is out-of-state. The Department of Homeland Security has incorporated their own federal immigration status standards and has let each state know that they must use these standards to identify illegal alien applicants. There are three different ways to verify illegal aliens. These ways are self-certification, local review, and database verification.

Self-certification involves "a process where a student is responsible for self-reporting his or her residency and/or citizenship status on an application or other required forms". The admissions office can either trust the student on what they say or they can ask them for more documentation. This is the least recommended verification process, but it is also the cheapest.

When the admissions office asks for more documents to verify residency, this is called Local Review. The local review verification method is "a process by which the student submits documentation to support residency and/or citizenship claims". Documents that can be submitted can either be a birth certificate from any one of the fifty states or one that proves you are an American citizen but you were born out of the country or a passport or Immigration Customs Enforcement (ICE) documentation.

The last method to use is the Database Verification method. This method costs more to use because you are not just paying for those working in the admissions office, but you are also paying to use the Systematic Alien Verification of Entitlements (SAVE) program as discussed earlier. This is a "process used to verify the legal status of non-citizens, where students submit the requested information and colleges use a two-stage national system to determine the legality of a student's non-citizen status". The SAVE program costs the individual school using the program twenty-five dollars a month for the service plus up to a dollar maximum per student being verified. When a school is verifying a student using the SAVE system, the initial verification costs fifty cents. If the school needs to complete an additional verification, it will cost an extra fifty cents, but any additional verification after the second is free.

== Policy evaluation ==
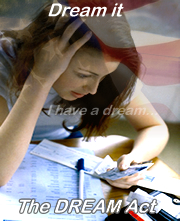
Poster advocating passage of the DREAM Act

As of right now, there have not been any studies on the NCCCS's new policy on their admission of undocumented students; only criticism. The board is receiving criticism from all sorts of politicians, scholars, and protesters on their state policy. One piece of legislation that was introduced to the senate in 2001 and then reintroduced again in 2011 that would be in favor of illegal aliens is the Development, Relief, and Education for Alien Minors (DREAM) Act. The purpose of the DREAM Act is to "help those individuals who meet certain requirements, have an opportunity to enlist in the military or go to college and have a path to citizenship which they otherwise would not have without this legislation". The DREAM Act would give illegal aliens conditional permanent residency if they meet the criteria: enter the United States before the age of sixteen, be present in the United States for at least five (5) consecutive years prior to enactment of the bill, either graduate from a United States high school, have a G.E.D., or be accepted into a school of higher education, be between the age of twelve and twenty-five at the time of application, and have good moral character. The illegal alien will have permanent resident status for six years and will be eligible for student loans and federal work-study programs; however, the student is not eligible for federal financial aid programs such as Pell Grants.

If the DREAM Act passes, the Congressional Budget Office and the Joint Committee on Taxation stated in 2010 that the DREAM Act will "reduce deficits by about $1.4 billion over the 2011–2020 period and increase government revenues by $2.3 billion over the next 10 years". So far only eleven states have passed legislation that has allowed illegal aliens to attend college at the in-state tuition rate: California, Illinois, Kansas, Maryland, Nebraska, New Mexico, New York, Texas, Utah, Washington, and Wisconsin. There are thirty-nine other states that do not either allow for in-state tuition or no admission at all for illegal aliens and there has yet to be federal legislation passed.
