= WNCW =

Radio station in Spindale, North Carolina, United States

- Spindale, North Carolina; United States
- Broadcast area: Western North Carolina; Charlotte, North Carolina; Greenville, South Carolina
- Frequency: 88.7 MHz
- Branding: WNCW 88.7

Programming
- Format: Adult album alternative; Americana
- Affiliations: National Public Radio; American Public Media

Ownership
- Owner: Isothermal Community College

History
- First air date: October 13, 1989
- Call sign meaning: "Western North Carolina Window"

Technical information
- Licensing authority: FCC
- Facility ID: 29262
- Class: C
- ERP: 17,000 watts
- HAAT: 923 meters (3,028 ft)
- Transmitter coordinates: 35°44′6.4″N 82°17′10.4″W
- Translator: See § Translators
- Repeater: See § Simulcast

Links
- Public license information: Public file; LMS
- Webcast: Listen live
- Website: www.wncw.org

WNCW (88.7 FM, "WNCW 88.7") is a non-commercial public radio FM station licensed to serve Spindale, North Carolina. Owned by Isothermal Community College, the station broadcasts a varied format including Americana, folk, blues, jazz, reggae, Celtic, world, rock, bluegrass, indie, and National Public Radio News.

The station's broadcast area covers most of western North Carolina from a tower on Clingman's Peak near Mount Mitchell. The tower's elevation is 6,634 feet (2,022 m) above sea level. WNCW programming is also available on WSIF, Wilkesboro, North Carolina, and on four translators. WNCW has at least secondary coverage in portions of North Carolina, South Carolina, Tennessee, Georgia, and Virginia.

The station has a recording facility, Studio B, where a range of musical artists perform and are interviewed for the station's regular live programs. Selected recordings are compiled into annual "Crowd Around The Mic" albums which are only available to people who pledge support to the station, while some video recordings of the sessions are posted on YouTube.

== History ==
In 1986, Isothermal Community College received support of the State of North Carolina and the federal government to begin the process of planning and starting a public radio station for western North Carolina along with the communities it would be serving. The college was granted a construction permit for a new station by the Federal Communications Commission on October 8, 1986.

On October 13, 1989, WNCW signed on from a tower on Clingman's Peak near Mount Mitchell at 6 a.m. with Morning Edition, starting with the theme music from B.J. Leiderman. Station manager Burr Beard described the audience as "everyone". Crossroads aired from 9 a.m. to 5 p.m. weekdays, with songs from 6000 LPs and "hundreds of compact discs", and started with a song from the Tracy Chapman album Crossroads. Other programming included National Public Radio and American Public Radio. The earliest description of WNCW's original programming said that the station's weekday program was Crossroads, featuring a broad range of music genres, similar to today; in the evenings, listeners could hear classic radio dramas like The Lone Ranger and Sherlock Holmes followed by classical music. The FCC granted the station its first license on January 23, 1990.

In 1992, the Alternative Radio Coalition began. A major goal of the 1600-member group was to raise $15,000 for a translator that would reach Charlotte listeners. Meanwhile, WNCW added a translator at 97.3 MHz in Greenville, South Carolina, in 1993 and had plans for one in Boone, North Carolina, by 1995. The Charlotte translator finally signed on at 100.7 MHz across the street from Cotswold Mall in May 1994.

WNCW produced its first "Crowd Around the Mic" CD compilation of live recordings in 1997. In 1999, WNCW began streaming programming on the Internet.

In 2002, WNCW wanted to improve its signal in Charlotte, which would include a move to 100.3 MHz and relocating to the WFAE tower. One reason for the change: WABZ (broadcasting at 100.9 MHz) planned to move to the Charlotte area from Albemarle, North Carolina, and this would significantly impact WNCW's translator on 100.7 MHz. The move to 100.3 MHz was completed late in 2004.

Until 2003, WNCW programming was simulcast on a translator at 96.7 MHz in Knoxville, Tennessee.

In 2009, Isothermal Community College acquired the license of WSIF, Wilkesboro, North Carolina, formerly operated by Wilkes Community College. WSIF began simulcasting WNCW programming in January 2010. Also in 2009, the North Carolina General Assembly voted to eliminate state funding for all public radio stations that received the funding. There was much restructuring during this time. An emergency fundraiser was held, and many members and underwriters increased their support to WNCW, to make up for the 20% funding loss. For the station's 20th anniversary, more than 1000 listeners voted for WNCW's Top Artists - Bob Dylan was voted #1, followed by The Avett Brothers, Grateful Dead/Jerry Garcia, Alison Krauss, Johnny Cash, Acoustic Syndicate, The Beatles, Doc Watson, Neil Young, and The Allman Brothers Band.

WNCW's 25th annual end-of-year Top 100 contest, in which listeners and programmers vote for their ten favorite album releases of the year, was conducted in 2014. The #1 pick was Sturgill Simpson's "Metamodern Sounds in Country Music", followed by that year's albums from Balsam Range, Lake Street Dive, Old Crow Medicine Show, and Shovels & Rope.

As of 2019, WNCW's translators were on 97.3 MHz in Greenville, South Carolina, 92.9 MHz in Boone, North Carolina, and 101.3 MHz in Charlotte, North Carolina, in addition to WSIF on 90.9 MHz in Wilkesboro, North Carolina. For the station's 30th anniversary Fall Fund Drive, listeners contributed approximately $230,000, the highest fund drive total in at least 15 years. The "Crowd Around the Mic" compilation (Volume 23) was expanded to 3 CD's for the first time.

== Simulcast ==
One full-power station is licensed to simulcast the programming of WNCW:

Call sign	Frequency	City of license	Facility ID	ERP W	Height m (ft)	Class	Transmitter coordinates
WSIF	90.9 FM	Wilkesboro, North Carolina	72460	1,000	−52 m (−171 ft)	A	36°8′12.4″N 81°11′1.3″W

== Translators ==
WNCW programming is broadcast on the following translators:

Broadcast translators for WNCW
Call sign	Frequency	City of license	FID	ERP (W)	HAAT	Class	Transmitter coordinates	FCC info
W225AA	92.9 FM	Boone, North Carolina	29266	10	422 m (1,385 ft)	D	36°14′6.4″N 81°42′6.3″W	LMS
W247AB	97.3 FM	Greenville, South Carolina	29263	19	78 m (256 ft)	D	34°51′7.4″N 82°23′59.4″W	LMS
W267BZ	101.3 FM	Charlotte, North Carolina	156599	80	32 m (105 ft)	D	35°11′23.5″N 80°48′35.3″W	LMS

The following translator is owned by Isothermal Community College and WNCW is the listed parent station, according to the FCC:

Call sign	Frequency	City of license	FID	ERP (W)	HAAT	Class	Transmitter coordinates	FCC info
W271CB	102.1 FM	Asheville, North Carolina	156688	10	349 m (1,145 ft)	D	35°35′23.3″N 82°40′25.4″W	LMS
