= John Autry (politician) =

American politician from North Carolina

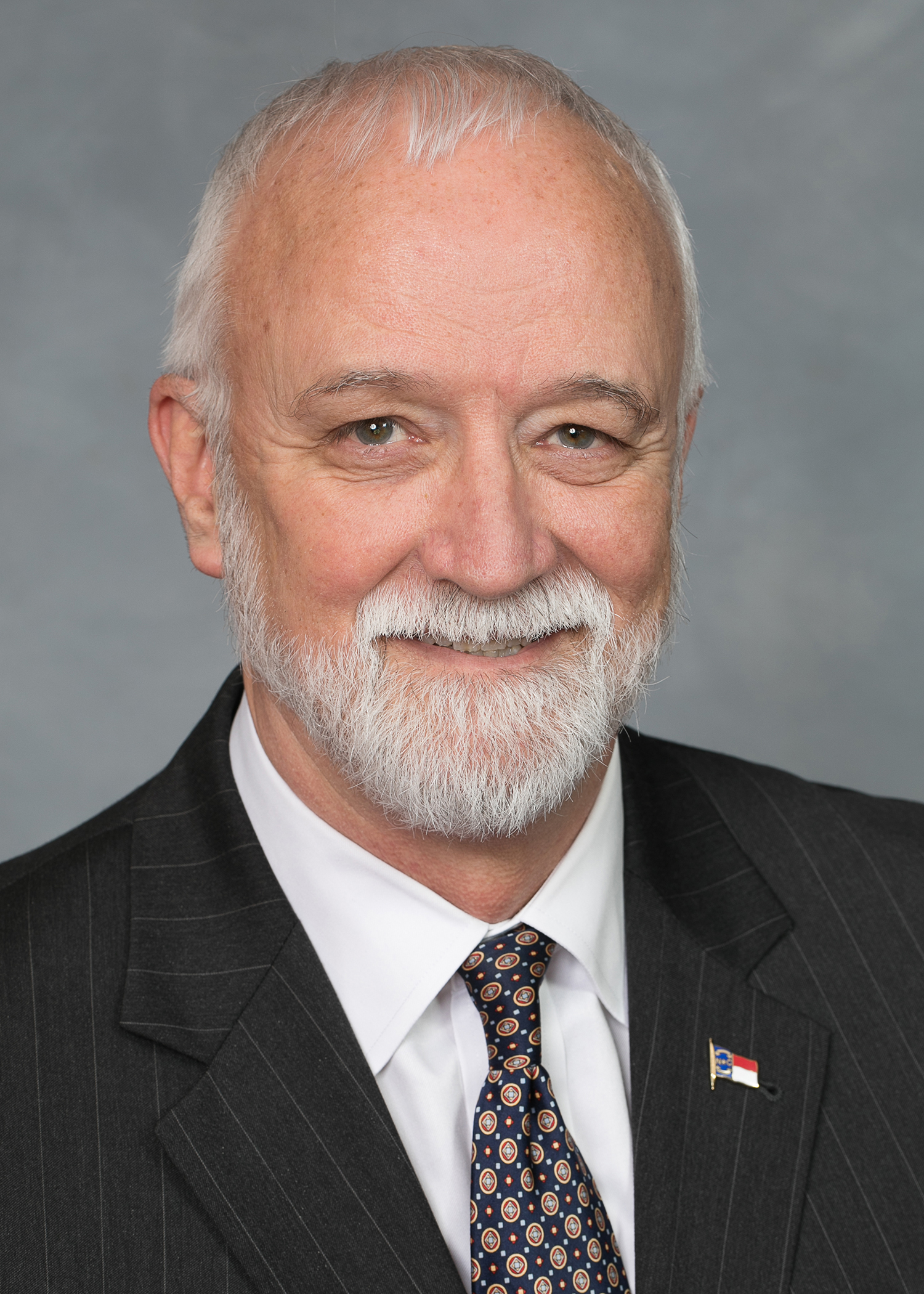

Member of the North Carolina House of Representatives from the 100th district
- In office 2017–2025
- Preceded by: Tricia Cotham
- Succeeded by: Julia Greenfield

Personal details
- Born: Johnnie Newton Autry; March 16, 1953 (age 73) Fayetteville, North Carolina, U.S.
- Party: Democratic
- Spouse: Rebecca
- Education: California State University, Fullerton
- Occupation: Freelance media production

Johnnie Newton Autry (born March 16, 1953) is an American politician. He was elected to the North Carolina House of Representatives in 2016. A Democrat, he served the 100th district. He previously served on the Charlotte City Council.

On November 9, 2023, Rep. Autry announced he would not seek reelection in 2024.

== Electoral history ==
=== 2020 ===
North Carolina House of Representatives 100th district general election, 2020
| Party | Candidate | Votes | % |
|---|---|---|---|
| Democratic | John Autry (incumbent) | 23,805 | 71.94% |
| Republican | Kalle Thompson | 9,285 | 28.06% |
| Total votes | | 33,090 | 100% |
| Democratic hold | | | |

=== 2018 ===
North Carolina House of Representatives 100th district general election, 2018
| Party | Candidate | Votes | % |
|---|---|---|---|
| Democratic | John Autry (incumbent) | 16,755 | 70.83% |
| Republican | Nancy Campbell | 6,901 | 29.17% |
| Total votes | | 23,656 | 100% |
| Democratic hold | | | |

=== 2016 ===
North Carolina House of Representatives 100th district Democratic primary election, 2016
| Party | Candidate | Votes | % |
|---|---|---|---|
| Democratic | John Autry | 4,498 | 53.22% |
| Democratic | Billy Maddalon | 3,953 | 46.78% |
| Total votes | | 8,451 | 100% |

North Carolina House of Representatives 100th district general election, 2016
| Party | Candidate | Votes | % |
|---|---|---|---|
| Democratic | John Autry | 25,736 | 100% |
| Total votes | | 25,736 | 100% |
| Democratic hold | | | |

North Carolina House of Representatives
| Preceded by Tricia Cotham | Member of the North Carolina House of Representatives from the 100th district 2017–Present | Incumbent |
