= Julia Greenfield =

American politician

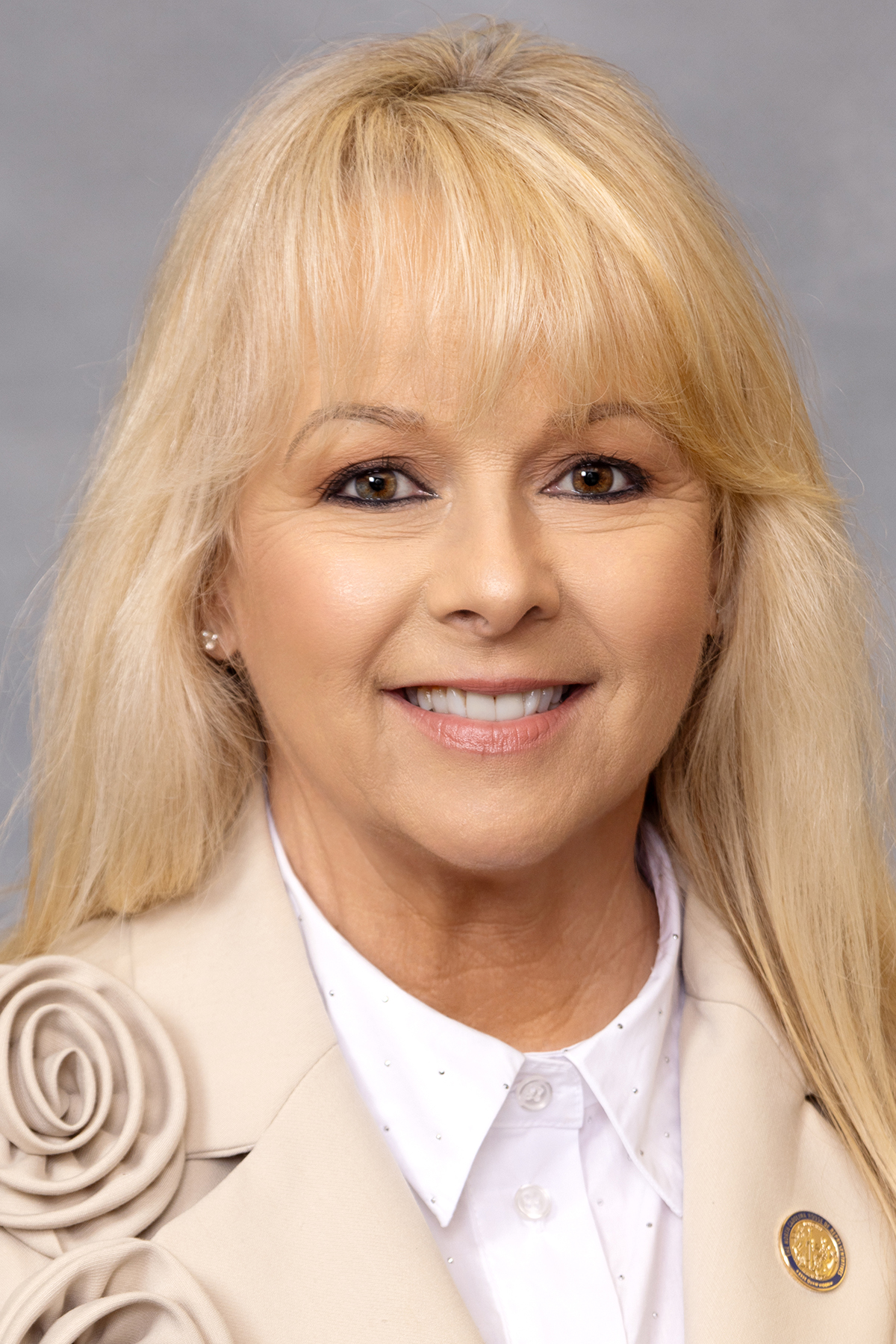

Member of the North Carolina House of Representatives from the 100th district
- Incumbent
- Assumed office January 1, 2025
- Preceded by: John Autry

Personal details
- Party: Democratic
- Education: Central Piedmont Community College
- Alma mater: Appalachian State University
- Website: www.juliag4nc.com

Julia Greenfield is a Democratic member of the North Carolina House of Representatives. She has represented the 100th district since 2025. She's a member of the Progressive House Caucus.

Greenfield is a former nurse. She attended Appalachian State University and graduated from nursing school at Central Piedmont Community College.
