= Tricia Cotham =

American politician (born 1978)

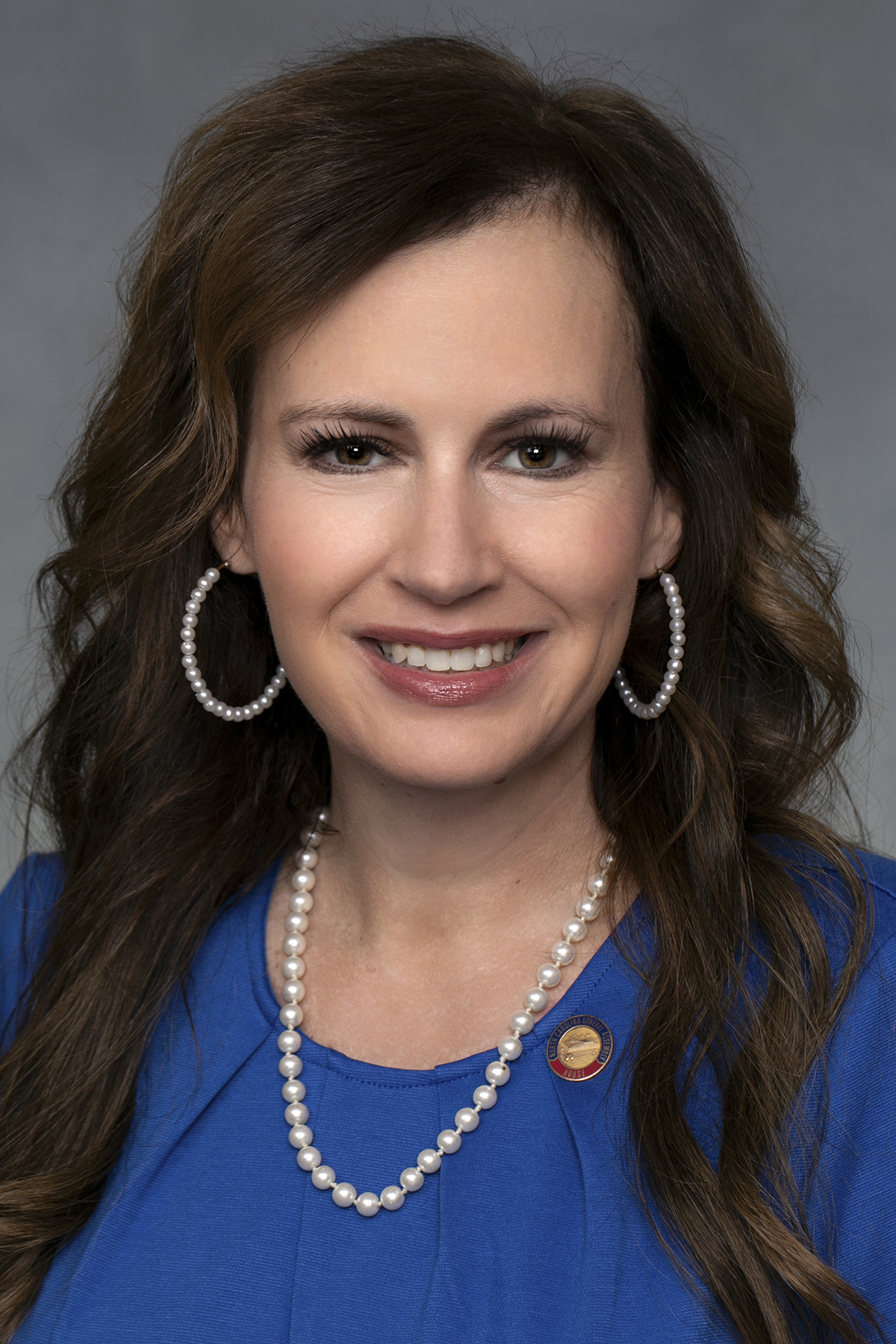
- Official portrait, 2023

Member of the North Carolina House of Representatives
- Incumbent
- Assumed office January 1, 2023
- Preceded by: Constituency established
- Constituency: 112th District (2023–2025); 105th District (2025–Present)
- In office March 22, 2007 – January 1, 2017
- Preceded by: Jim Black
- Succeeded by: John Autry
- Constituency: 100th District

Personal details
- Born: Patricia Ann Cotham; November 26, 1978 (age 47) Charlotte, North Carolina, U.S.
- Party: Democratic (before 2023); Republican (since 2023)
- Spouse: Jerry Meek (m. 2008, divorced)
- Children: 2
- Relatives: Pat Cotham (mother), John Cotham (father)
- Education: University of North Carolina, Charlotte (BA); University of North Carolina, Chapel Hill (MPA)

Patricia Ann Cotham (born November 26, 1978) is an American politician, lobbyist and former schoolteacher. She is a member of the North Carolina House of Representatives from the 105th district, based in Mecklenburg County.

Cotham represented the 100th district in the North Carolina House of Representatives from 2007 to 2017 as a Democrat. She was elected as a Democrat in 2022 to represent District 112. Cotham formally changed her affiliation to the Republican Party on April 5, 2023, granting the North Carolina House Republicans a supermajority. Prior to her party switch, Cotham had campaigned on a traditional Democratic Party platform and had voted for abortion rights legislation. Shortly after her party switch, Cotham cast the deciding vote for legislation to limit abortion to the first 12 weeks of pregnancy. Cotham ran for re-election in 2026, but lost to the Democratic Party challenger Ken McCool in the general election by a wide margin, 57% (24,608) to 43% (18,479).

== Career ==
In March 2007, Cotham was appointed to represent the 100th district in the North Carolina House of Representatives to replace Rep. Jim Black, who had resigned. She was elected to the House in 2008, and was re-elected in 2010, 2012, and 2014. Cotham was co-chair of the House's K-12 Education subcommittee from 2008–2010.

Cotham is a "former CMS Teacher of the Year and assistant principal of East Mecklenburg and Independence high schools".

In 2015, Cotham gave a speech on the House floor explaining that she had had an abortion, saying, "This decision was up to me, my husband, my doctor and my God. It was not up to any of you in this chamber."

Cotham chose not to run for re-election in 2016 to pursue a U.S. congressional seat. She later said she would consider running for the U.S. House of Representatives in the newly redrawn 12th congressional district. Cotham filed to run for the U.S. House seat on March 21, 2016, but lost the Democratic primary to incumbent Congresswoman Alma Adams.

In 2019, Cotham and three partners founded the lobbying firm BCHL. She worked as a registered lobbyist, routinely engaging with the leadership in the North Carolina General Assembly.

In 2022, Cotham sought to return to the North Carolina House of Representatives. Some Republican political leaders in North Carolina recruited her to run for office as a Democrat. Reporting uncovered the Cotham campaign disengaged with key Democratic allies during the primary, such as Planned Parenthood, and she had a long-rumored romantic relationship with Speaker Tim Moore, though Cotham has denied it. Moore has been sued for his personal affairs with other married women. This time, she ran for the House in the 112th district, defeating Republican Tony Long, 59.2%-40.8%. Cotham ran on a platform of raising the minimum wage, protecting voting rights and supporting LGBTQ rights.

In early 2023, Cotham voted to codify the abortion-related Roe v. Wade decision into state law.

On April 4, 2023, WRAL-TV reported that Cotham had changed her party registration from Democratic to Republican. On April 5, 2023, Cotham announced that she had left the Democratic Party and joined the Republican Party. Cotham's move gave House Republicans a veto-proof majority that allowed them to pass legislation without negotiating with North Carolina's Democratic governor, Roy Cooper. Cotham stated that fellow Democrats had criticized her on Twitter, called her names, and had been "coming after [her] family, coming after [her] children". She also said the turning point was a situation in which she was hounded for using the American flag on social media and on her vehicles. In another interview, she said "she felt bullied by Democrats and wanted to switch to a party that felt more welcoming".

In May 2023, Cotham voted in favor of a ban on abortions after 12 weeks of pregnancy. Cotham's deciding vote enabled Republicans to override Gov. Cooper's veto and enact the legislation. North Carolina Rep. Wesley Harris accused Cotham of having lied to the voters, Alexis McGill Johnson of Planned Parenthood admonished Cotham, and former aides spoke out against her "abortion betrayal". As well as her colleagues, many of Cotham’s constituents have expressed feelings of betrayal from her party switch.

Cotham ran for re-election in the 2024 elections, and was narrowly re-elected with after a recount against the Democratic party challenger Nichole Sidman by just 213 votes. However, she lost re-election in the subsequent 2026 elections to the Democratic party challenger Ken McCool, by a margin of 57.1% to 42.9%. McCool had garnered significant support from the North Carolina Democratic Party and he had consistently outspent and outraised more money than Cotham.

== Personal life and family ==
Cotham's mother, Pat Cotham, was elected to the Democratic National Committee in 2010. Pat Cotham served as a member of the Mecklenburg County Board of Commissioners from 2012 until 2024. Cotham's father, John Cotham, was CEO of Carolina Industrial Trucks in 2024. He has had a long legal association with Republican US Rep. Tim Moore and has donated to his campaigns.

Tricia Cotham married state Democratic Party chair Jerry Meek in late 2008. They divorced in 2021.

Cotham has two sons.

== Electoral history ==
=== 2026 ===
North Carolina House of Representatives 105th district general election, 2026
Party	Candidate	Votes	%
Democratic	Ken McCool	24,608	57%
Republican	Tricia Cotham	18,479	43%
Total votes		43,087	100%

=== 2024 ===
North Carolina House of Representatives 105th district general election, 2024
Party	Candidate	Votes	%
Republican	Tricia Cotham (incumbent)	27,303	50.20%
Democratic	Nicole Sidman	27,087	49.80%
Total votes		54,390	100%
Republican hold			

=== 2022 ===
North Carolina House of Representatives 112th district Democratic primary election, 2022
Party	Candidate	Votes	%
Democratic	Tricia Cotham	2,385	47.81%
Democratic	Yolanda Holmes	1,559	31.25%
Democratic	Jay Holman	853	17.10%
Democratic	Rodney Moore	192	3.85%
Total votes		4,989	100%

North Carolina House of Representatives 112th district general election, 2022
Party	Candidate	Votes	%
Democratic	Tricia Cotham	15,389	59.22%
Republican	Tony Long	10,597	40.78%
Total votes		25,986	100%
Democratic win (new seat)			

=== 2016 ===
North Carolina's 12th congressional district Democratic primary election, 2016
Party	Candidate	Votes	%
Democratic	Alma Adams (incumbent)	12,400	42.51%
Democratic	Malcolm Graham	8,428	28.89%
Democratic	Tricia Cotham	6,165	21.13%
Democratic	Carla Cunningham	1,255	4.30%
Democratic	Gardenia Henley	444	1.52%
Democratic	Rodney Moore	245	0.84%
Democratic	Rick Miller	235	0.81%
Total votes		29,172	100%

=== 2014 ===
North Carolina House of Representatives 100th district general election, 2014
Party	Candidate	Votes	%
Democratic	Tricia Cotham (incumbent)	12,707	100%
Total votes		12,707	100%
Democratic hold			

=== 2012 ===
North Carolina House of Representatives 100th district general election, 2012
Party	Candidate	Votes	%
Democratic	Tricia Cotham (incumbent)	24,217	100%
Total votes		24,217	100%
Democratic hold			

=== 2010 ===
North Carolina House of Representatives 100th district general election, 2010
Party	Candidate	Votes	%
Democratic	Tricia Cotham (incumbent)	9,578	100%
Total votes		9,578	100%
Democratic hold			

=== 2008 ===
North Carolina House of Representatives 100th district Democratic primary election, 2008
Party	Candidate	Votes	%
Democratic	Tricia Cotham (incumbent)	7,685	78.83%
Democratic	Lloyd Scher	2,064	21.17%
Total votes		9,749	100%

North Carolina House of Representatives 100th district general election, 2008
Party	Candidate	Votes	%
Democratic	Tricia Cotham (incumbent)	19,548	74.07%
Republican	Tom White	6,843	25.93%
Total votes		26,391	100%
Democratic hold			

North Carolina House of Representatives
Preceded by Jim Black	Member of the North Carolina House of Representatives from the 100th district 2007–2017	Succeeded by John Autry
Preceded by David Rogers	Member of the North Carolina House of Representatives from the 112th district 2023–2025	Succeeded by Jordan Lopez
Preceded by Wesley Harris	Member of the North Carolina House of Representatives from the 105th district 2025–Present	Incumbent
