= Cody Henson =

American politician

Member of the North Carolina House of Representatives from the 113th district
- In office January 1, 2017 – July 24, 2019
- Preceded by: Chris Whitmire
- Succeeded by: Jake Johnson

Personal details
- Born: Rosman, North Carolina
- Party: Republican

Cody Henson is an American politician who served in the North Carolina House of Representatives representing the 113th district (including constituents in Henderson, Polk, and Transylvania counties) from January 2017 until his resignation on July 24, 2019, following his pleading guilty to cyberstalking in a domestic violence case.

== Career ==
Henson was elected to the North Carolina House of Representatives in 2016 to succeed Chris Whitmire, who wasn't seeking re-election. He was re-elected to the seat in 2018. Henson pleaded guilty to cyberstalking on July 23, 2019 as part of a plea deal to receive looser sentencing, and he was sentenced to 18 months probation. Henson who had already announced that he wouldn't seek re-election in 2020 originally said he would finish his term in the NC House, but resigned the next day. Polk County Commissioner Jake Johnson was appointed to Henson's seat on August 6, 2019 to fill the remainder of the term and he was elected to a full term in 2020.

== Electoral history ==
=== 2018 ===
North Carolina House of Representatives 113th district general election, 2018
Party	Candidate	Votes	%
Republican	Cody Henson (incumbent)	22,407	57.52%
Democratic	Sam Edney	16,551	42.48%
Total votes		38,958	100%
Republican hold			

=== 2016 ===
North Carolina House of Representatives 113th district Republican Primary election, 2016
Party	Candidate	Votes	%
Republican	Cody Henson	7,718	64.69%
Republican	Coty James Ferguson	4,212	35.31%
Total votes		11,930	100%

North Carolina House of Representatives 113th district general election, 2016
Party	Candidate	Votes	%
Republican	Cody Henson	26,848	61.61%
Democratic	Maureen Mahan Copelof	16,726	38.39%
Total votes		43,574	100%
Republican hold			

== Committee assignments ==
=== 2019 Session ===
- Wildlife Resources (Chair)
- Homeland Security, Military, and Veterans Affairs (Vice Chair)
- Education - K-12
- Finance
- Regulatory Reform
- Insurance

=== 2017-2018 Session ===
- Wildlife Resources
- Homeland Security, Military, and Veterans Affairs
- Education - K-12
- Finance
- Regulatory Reform

North Carolina House of Representatives
Preceded by Chris Whitmire	Member of the North Carolina House of Representatives from the 113th district 2017-2019	Succeeded by Jake Johnson
