= Jake Johnson (North Carolina politician) =

American politician (born 1994)

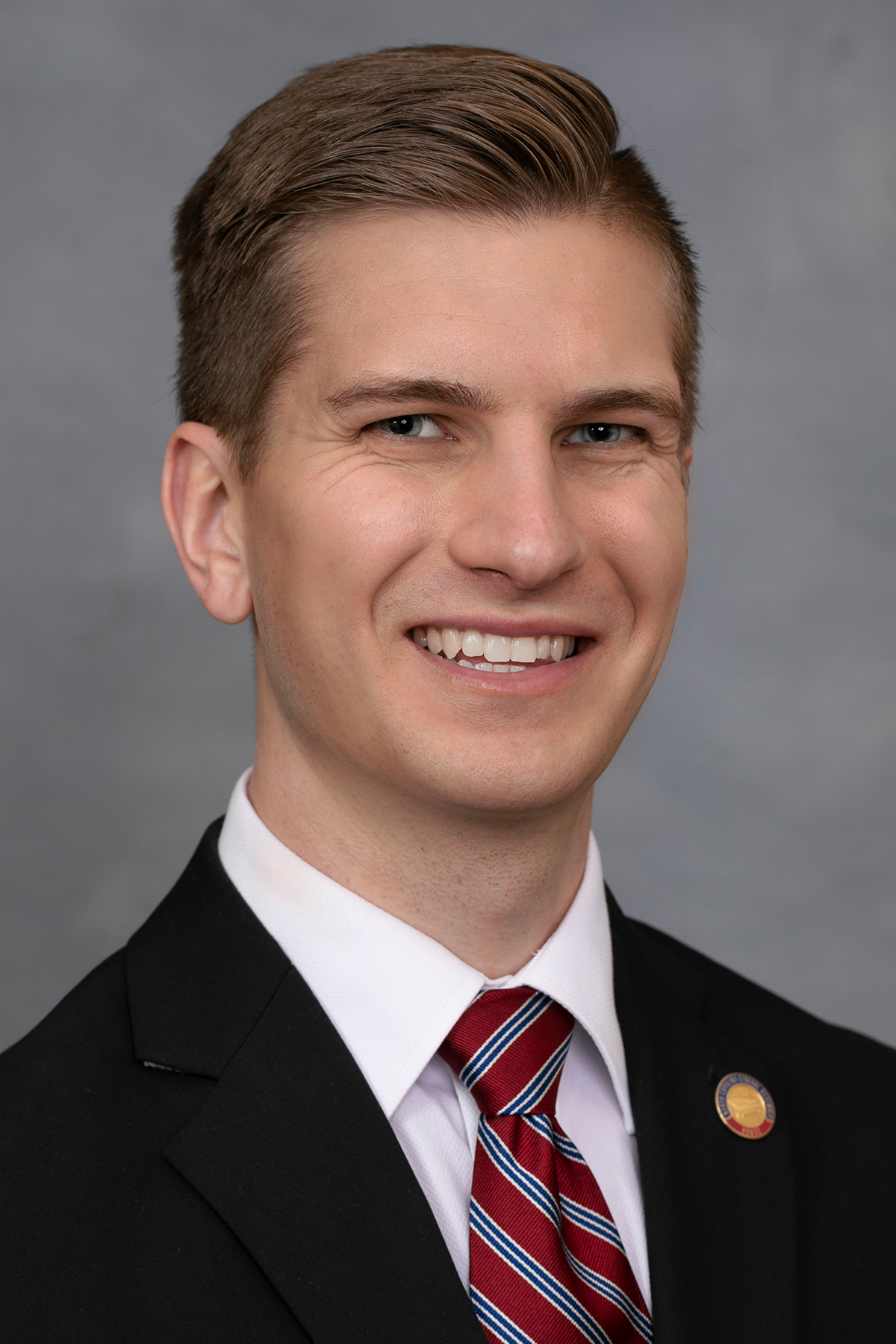

Member of the North Carolina House of Representatives from the 113th district
- Incumbent
- Assumed office August 2, 2019
- Preceded by: Cody Henson

Personal details
- Born: May 15, 1994 (age 32) Saluda, North Carolina, U.S.
- Party: Republican
- Education: University of North Carolina, Charlotte (BA)
- Website: State House website Campaign website

Jake Hunter Johnson is a Republican member of the North Carolina House of Representatives who has represented the 113th district (covering all or parts of Polk, Henderson, McDowell, and Rutherford counties) since 2019.

== Early life and education ==
Johnson was born and raised on a farm in Saluda, a small town in Polk County. He was the first member of his family to attend college. Johnson graduated from the University of North Carolina at Charlotte in 2016 with a Bachelor of Arts degree in political science and a minor in economics.

== Early political career ==
Johnson became involved in politics during his college years. At the age of 22, he was elected to the Polk County Board of Commissioners in 2016, becoming one of the youngest elected officials in North Carolina at the time and serving from December 5, 2016 to August 2, 2019. After initially serving as the board's vice chairman, he was appointed chairman in December 2017.

During his tenure, the board oversaw initiatives that included reductions in the county unemployment rate, pay increases for county employees, construction of a new law enforcement facility, and economic development efforts connected to the 2018 FEI World Equestrian Games held at Tryon International Equestrian Center in Mill Spring.

Prior to his appointment to the House in 2019, Johnson was reported to be considering a run for Secretary of State in 2020.

== North Carolina House of Representatives ==
Johnson was appointed to the North Carolina House of Representatives in August 2019 to fill the unexpired term of Cody Henson in the 113th district. He was elected to his first full term in 2020 and was subsequently re-elected in 2022 and 2024.

In 2023, Johnson was appointed House Deputy Majority Whip.

In October 2025, former House Majority Leader Mike Hager announced his intention to challenge Johnson in the Republican primary for the seat in 2026. Johnson defeated Hager in the 2026 primary with over 60 percent of the vote.

== Professional career ==
Johnson works as a real estate agent with Berkshire Hathaway HomeServices in Hendersonville, North Carolina.

== Personal life ==
Johnson resides in Polk County, North Carolina. He enjoys outdoor activities, including hunting and fishing, and spends time with his family and his dog, Scout. He is a member of Silver Creek Baptist Church in Mill Spring, North Carolina.

== Electoral history ==
=== 2024 ===
North Carolina House of Representatives 113th district general election, 2024
Party	Candidate	Votes	%
Republican	Jake Johnson (incumbent)	34,467	66.68%
Democratic	Michelle Antalec	17,223	33.32%
Total votes		51,690	100%
Republican hold			

=== 2022 ===
North Carolina House of Representatives 113th district general election, 2022
Party	Candidate	Votes	%
Republican	Jake Johnson (incumbent)	27,267	100%
Total votes		27,267	100%
Republican hold			

North Carolina House of Representatives 113th district primary election, 2022
Party	Candidate	Votes	%
Republican	Jake Johnson (incumbent)	7,585	65.08%
Republican	David Rogers (incumbent)	4,069	34.92%
Total votes		11,654	100%

=== 2020 ===
North Carolina House of Representatives 113th district general election, 2020
Party	Candidate	Votes	%
Republican	Jake Johnson (incumbent)	30,367	59.59%
Democratic	Sam Edney	20,596	40.41%
Total votes		50,963	100%
Republican hold			

=== 2016 ===
Polk County Board of Commissioners general election, 2016
Party	Candidate	Votes	%
Republican	Jake Johnson	6,370	22.19%
Republican	Myron L. Yoder	5,913	20.60%
Republican	Tommy W. Melton	5,569	19.40%
Democratic	Penny Padgett	3,868	13.47%
Democratic	Rhonda Lewis	3,726	12.98%
Democratic	Russell A. Mierop	3,261	11.36%
Total votes		28,707	100%

Polk County Board of Commissioners primary election, 2016
Party	Candidate	Votes	%
Republican	Jake Johnson	2,032	26.17%
Republican	Tommy W. Melton	1,778	22.89%
Republican	Myron L. Yoder	1,590	20.47%
Republican	John Dennis Hill	1,221	15.72%
Republican	Josh Denton	1,145	14.74%
Total votes		7,766	100%

=== 2014 ===
Polk County Board of Commissioners primary election, 2014
Party	Candidate	Votes	%
Republican	Keith Holbert	787	27.24%
Republican	Shane Bradley	740	25.61%
Republican	Teddy (Ted) Owens	731	25.30%
Republican	Jake Johnson	631	21.84%
Total votes		11,654	100%

== Committee assignments ==
=== 2025-2026 session ===
Standing or Select Committees:

- Appropriations (Vice Chair)
- Appropriations, Capital and Information Technology (Chair)
- Commerce and Economic Development (Vice Chair)
- Education - K-12
- Helene Recovery (Vice Chair)
- Oversight and Reform (Chair)
- Oversight (Chair)
- Wildlife Resources

=== 2023-2024 session ===
Standing or Select Committees:

- Appropriations (Vice Chair)
- Appropriations - Information Technology (Chair)
- Banking
- Commerce (Vice Chair)
- Education - K-12
- Oversight and Reform (Chair)
- Wildlife Resources

=== 2021-2022 session ===
Standing or Select Committees:

- Appropriations (Vice Chair)
- Appropriations - Information Technology (Chair)
- Commerce (Vice Chair)
- Homeland Security, Military, and Veterans Affairs
- Regulatory Reform
- UNC BOG Nominations
