= Chris Whitmire =

American politician

Member of the North Carolina House of Representatives from the 113th district
- In office January 1, 2013 – January 1, 2017
- Preceded by: Trudi Walend
- Succeeded by: Cody Henson

Personal details
- Born: February 2, 1968 (age 58) Transylvania County, North Carolina
- Party: Republican
- Education: United States Air Force Academy (BS); Columbia University (MS)
- Occupation: Airline Pilot, Farmer

Chris Whitmire (born February 2, 1968) is an American politician who served in the North Carolina House of Representatives representing the 113th district (including constituents in Henderson, Polk, and Transylvania counties) from 2013 to 2017. A retired Colonel in the US Air Force, Whitmire also previously served on the Transylvania County Board of Education.

== Electoral history ==
=== 2014 ===
North Carolina House of Representatives 113th district general election, 2014
Party	Candidate	Votes	%
Republican	Chris Whitmire (incumbent)	19,594	63.26%
Democratic	Norm Bossert	11,379	36.74%
Total votes		30,973	100%
Republican hold			

=== 2012 ===
North Carolina House of Representatives 113th district Republican Primary election, 2012
Party	Candidate	Votes	%
Republican	Chris Whitmire	6,448	51.11%
Republican	Trudi Walend (incumbent)	6,169	48.89%
Total votes		12,617	100%

North Carolina House of Representatives 113th district general election, 2012
Party	Candidate	Votes	%
Republican	Chris Whitmire	25,663	63.03%
Democratic	George Alley	15,055	36.97%
Total votes		40,718	100%
Republican hold			

== Committee assignments ==
=== 2015-2016 Session ===
- Agriculture
- Appropriations
- Appropriations - Education (Vice Chair)
- Education - K-12
- Homeland Security, Military, and Veterans Affairs, Chairman
- Regulatory Reform
- State Personnel

=== 2013-2014 Session ===
- Agriculture
- Appropriations
- Education
- Homeland Security, Military, and Veterans Affairs
- Commerce and Job Development
- Public Utilities

North Carolina House of Representatives
Preceded by Trudi Walend	Member of the North Carolina House of Representatives from the 113th district 2013-2017	Succeeded by Cody Henson
