= Trudi Walend =

American politician from North Carolina

Representative Trudi Walend

Member of the North Carolina House of Representatives
- In office January 4, 2012 – January 1, 2013
- Preceded by: W. David Guice
- Succeeded by: Chris Whitmire
- Constituency: 113th District
- In office January 1, 1999 – January 1, 2009
- Preceded by: Bill Ives
- Succeeded by: W. David Guice
- Constituency: 68th District (1999–2003); 113th District (2003–2009)

Personal details
- Born: June 25, 1943 Atlanta, Georgia, U.S.
- Died: May 14, 2024 (aged 80)
- Party: Republican
- Education: Western Carolina University
- Occupation: Public Health Administration & Computer Business Owner
- Website: Campaign Website

Gertrude "Trudi" Walend (June 25, 1943 – May 14, 2024) was an American politician who served as a Republican member of the North Carolina House of Representatives who represented the 68th and 113th districts (including constituents in Henderson, Polk and Transylvania counties) from her election in 1998 until her retirement in 2009. She was then appointed to the seat again in 2012 to fill the vacancy caused by the resignation of Rep. W. David Guice. When she ran for a new full term, she was defeated by a narrow margin in the May 2012 Republican primary. A businessperson in Brevard, North Carolina, Walend at one time held the position of House Republican Whip.

Walend died at the age of 80 on May 14, 2024, due to complications from a fall.

== Committee assignments ==
=== 2012-2013 session ===
- Appropriations
- Appropriations - Justice and Public Safety
- Judiciary (Vice Chair)
- Agriculture
- Government
- State Personnel

== Electoral history ==
=== 2012 ===
North Carolina House of Representatives 113th district Republican Primary election, 2012
Party	Candidate	Votes	%
Republican	Chris Whitmire	6,448	51.11%
Republican	Trudi Walend (incumbent)	6,169	48.89%
Total votes		12,617	100%

=== 2006 ===
North Carolina House of Representatives 113th district general election, 2006
Party	Candidate	Votes	%
Republican	Trudi Walend (incumbent)	19,026	100%
Total votes		19,026	100%
Republican hold			

=== 2004 ===
North Carolina House of Representatives 113th district general election, 2004
Party	Candidate	Votes	%
Republican	Trudi Walend (incumbent)	24,016	100%
Total votes		24,016	100%
Republican hold			

=== 2002 ===
North Carolina House of Representatives 113th district general election, 2002
Party	Candidate	Votes	%
Republican	Trudi Walend (incumbent)	17,472	83.96%
Libertarian	Jean Marlowe	3,338	16.04%
Total votes		20,810	100%
Republican hold			

=== 2000 ===
North Carolina House of Representatives 68th district Republican primary election, 2000
Party	Candidate	Votes	%
Republican	Trudi Walend (incumbent)	3,809	78.59%
Republican	Horace Jarrett	1,038	21.42%
Total votes		4,847	100%

North Carolina House of Representatives 68th district general election, 2000
Party	Candidate	Votes	%
Republican	Trudi Walend (incumbent)	21,456	100%
Total votes		21,456	100%
Republican hold			

North Carolina House of Representatives
Preceded by William Maner "Bill" Ives	Member of the North Carolina House of Representatives from the 68th district 1999–2003	Succeeded by Wayne Goodwin
Preceded by Constituency established	Member of the North Carolina House of Representatives from the 113th district 2003–2009	Succeeded by David Guice
Preceded by David Guice	Member of the North Carolina House of Representatives from the 113th district 2012–2013	Succeeded by Chris Whitmire
