= North Carolina's 100th House district =

American legislative district

North Carolina's 100th State House of Representatives district
Representative
Julia Greenfield; D–Charlotte
- Demographics: 40% White; 26% Black; 22% Hispanic; 8% Asian; 3% Multiracial
- Population (2024): 88,870

North Carolina's 100th House district is one of 120 districts in the North Carolina House of Representatives. It has been represented by Democrat Julia Greenfield since 2025.

== Geography ==
Since 2003, the district has included part of Mecklenburg County. The district overlaps with the 40th and 42nd Senate districts.

== District officeholders ==
Representative	Party	Dates	Notes	Counties
District created January 1, 2003.				2003–Present; Part of Mecklenburg County.
Jim Black (Matthews)	Democratic	January 1, 2003 – February 14, 2007	Redistricted from the 36th district. Resigned.	2003–Present; Part of Mecklenburg County.
Vacant		February 14, 2007 – March 22, 2007		2003–Present; Part of Mecklenburg County.
Tricia Cotham (Matthews)	Democratic	March 22, 2007 – January 1, 2017	Appointed to finish Black's term. Retired to run for Congress.	2003–Present; Part of Mecklenburg County.
John Autry (Charlotte)	Democratic	January 1, 2017 – January 1, 2025	Retired.	2003–Present; Part of Mecklenburg County.
Julia Greenfield (Charlotte)	Democratic	January 1, 2025 – Present		2003–Present; Part of Mecklenburg County.

== Election results ==
=== 2024 ===
North Carolina House of Representatives 100th district general election, 2024
Party	Candidate	Votes	%
Democratic	Julia Greenfield	28,937	100%
Total votes		28,937	100%
Democratic hold			

=== 2022 ===
North Carolina House of Representatives 100th district general election, 2022
Party	Candidate	Votes	%
Democratic	John Autry (incumbent)	15,219	100%
Total votes		15,219	100%
Democratic hold			

=== 2020 ===
North Carolina House of Representatives 100th district general election, 2020
Party	Candidate	Votes	%
Democratic	John Autry (incumbent)	23,805	71.94%
Republican	Kalle Thompson	9,285	28.06%
Total votes		33,090	100%
Democratic hold			

=== 2018 ===
North Carolina House of Representatives 100th district general election, 2018
Party	Candidate	Votes	%
Democratic	John Autry (incumbent)	16,755	70.83%
Republican	Nancy Campbell	6,901	29.17%
Total votes		23,656	100%
Democratic hold			

=== 2016 ===
North Carolina House of Representatives 100th district Democratic primary election, 2016
Party	Candidate	Votes	%
Democratic	John Autry	4,498	53.22%
Democratic	Billy Maddalon	3,953	46.78%
Total votes		8,451	100%

North Carolina House of Representatives 100th district general election, 2016
Party	Candidate	Votes	%
Democratic	John Autry	25,736	100%
Total votes		25,736	100%
Democratic hold			

=== 2014 ===
North Carolina House of Representatives 100th district general election, 2014
Party	Candidate	Votes	%
Democratic	Tricia Cotham (incumbent)	12,707	100%
Total votes		12,707	100%
Democratic hold			

=== 2012 ===
North Carolina House of Representatives 100th district general election, 2012
Party	Candidate	Votes	%
Democratic	Tricia Cotham (incumbent)	24,217	100%
Total votes		24,217	100%
Democratic hold			

=== 2010 ===
North Carolina House of Representatives 100th district general election, 2010
Party	Candidate	Votes	%
Democratic	Tricia Cotham (incumbent)	9,578	100%
Total votes		9,578	100%
Democratic hold			

=== 2008 ===
North Carolina House of Representatives 100th district Democratic primary election, 2008
Party	Candidate	Votes	%
Democratic	Tricia Cotham (incumbent)	7,685	78.83%
Democratic	Lloyd Scher	2,064	21.17%
Total votes		9,749	100%

North Carolina House of Representatives 100th district general election, 2008
Party	Candidate	Votes	%
Democratic	Tricia Cotham (incumbent)	19,548	74.07%
Republican	Tom White	6,843	25.93%
Total votes		26,391	100%
Democratic hold			

=== 2006 ===
North Carolina House of Representatives 100th district general election, 2006
Party	Candidate	Votes	%
Democratic	Jim Black (incumbent)	5,340	50.14%
Republican	Hal Jordan	5,310	49.86%
Total votes		10,650	100%
Democratic hold			

=== 2004 ===
North Carolina House of Representatives 100th district general election, 2004
Party	Candidate	Votes	%
Democratic	Jim Black (incumbent)	16,160	100%
Total votes		16,160	100%
Democratic hold			

=== 2002 ===
North Carolina House of Representatives 100th district general election, 2002
Party	Candidate	Votes	%
Democratic	Jim Black (incumbent)	8,450	60.87%
Republican	Nick Cicali	5,432	39.13%
Total votes		13,882	100%
Democratic hold			
