= Jordan Lopez =

American politician from North Carolina

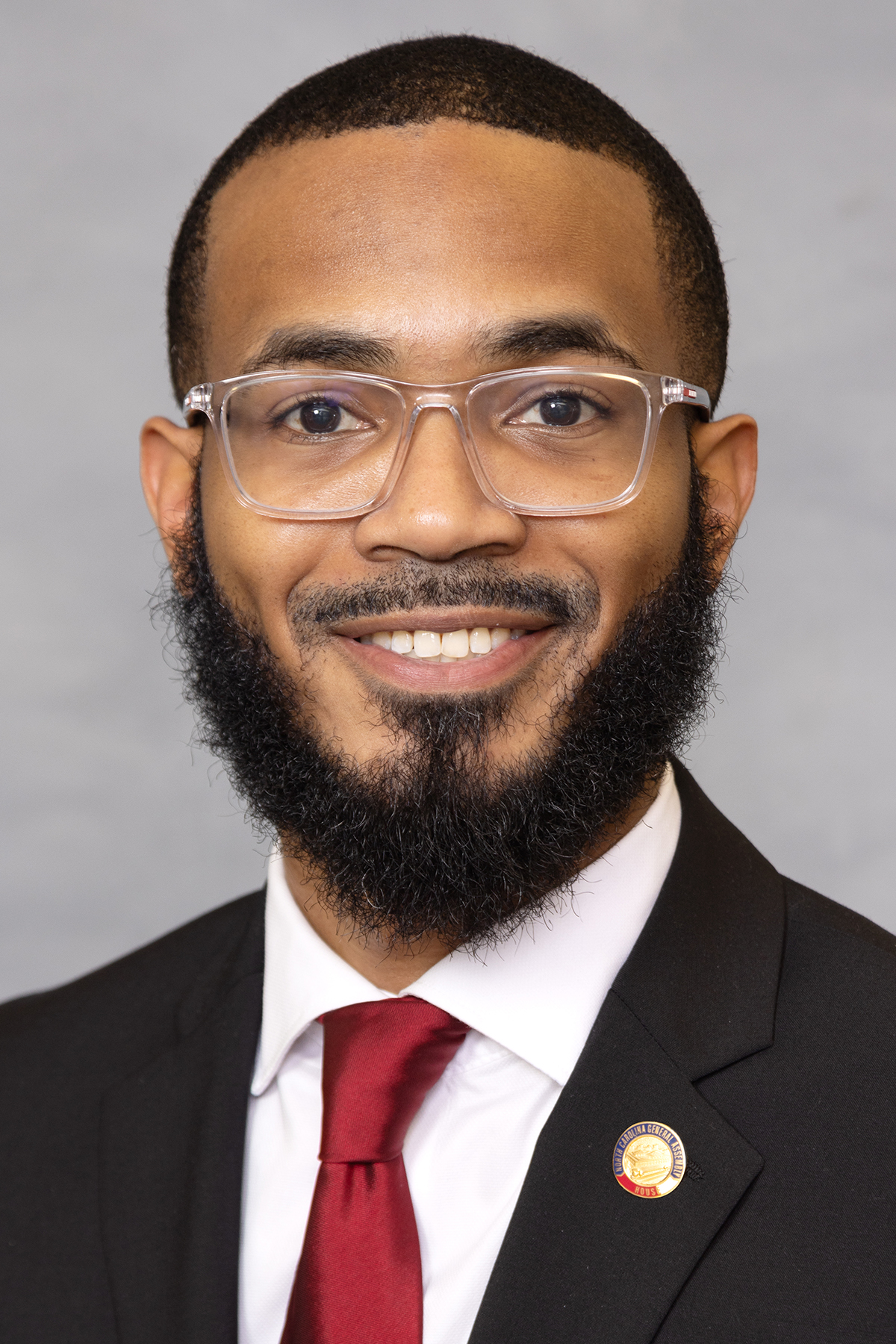

Member of the North Carolina House of Representatives from the 112th district
- Incumbent
- Assumed office January 1, 2025
- Preceded by: Constituency established

Personal details
- Born: Jordan Lopez; April 21, 1998 (age 28) Charlotte, North Carolina, U.S.
- Party: Democratic
- Education: University of North Carolina at Greensboro (BA); North Carolina Central University (MPA)

Jordan Lopez is an American politician serving as a member of the North Carolina House of Representatives from the 112th district. He is the first Afro-Latino member of the NC General Assembly.

== Personal life ==
Lopez is a native of East Charlotte and identifies as Black and Afro-Latino. He attended undergrad at UNC-Greensboro, and went on to get his MPA from NC Central University.

He currently serves as a member of the Andrea Harris Task Force for Racial Equity appointed by Governor Roy Cooper. He is a former member of the Charlotte Community Relations Committee appointed by Mayor Vi Lyles and the board of directors for community advocacy group CharlotteEAST.

== Professional career ==
Lopez is a policy analyst who has previously worked for the Office of NC Governor Roy Cooper and for Senator Mujtaba Mohammed in the NC Senate.

Lopez was elected to the NC House in 2024, facing no primary or general election opposition.

== Electoral history ==
=== 2024 ===
North Carolina House of Representatives 112th district general election, 2024
Party	Candidate	Votes	%
Democratic	Jordan Lopez	32,721	100%
Total votes		32,721	100%
Democratic hold			

North Carolina House of Representatives
Preceded by Tricia Cotham	Member of the North Carolina House of Representatives from the 112th district 2025–Present	Incumbent
