= Word of Faith Fellowship =

Evangelical church in Spindale, North Carolina, US

Word of Faith Fellowship is a Protestant non-denominational church in Spindale, North Carolina. It has been the subject of several allegations describing it as a cult and accusing it of abuse.

== History ==
Word of Faith Fellowship began in 1979, when Jane Whaley, then a math teacher, and her husband Sam Whaley converted a former steakhouse into a chapel. Jane Whaley, the daughter of a plumber and a homemaker in rural North Carolina, led the group as it grew to a membership of 750. The group later added almost 2,000 followers in related churches in Brazil, Ghana, Scotland, Sweden and other countries. Though Jane Whaley had no formal training in ministry, she was described as a compelling speaker and leader. The Whaleys' student from Rhema Bible College, Brooke Covington, is a minister in the church.

In Brazil, missionary John Martin started Ministerio Verbo Vivo (Live Word) near Belo Horizonte in 1987 after serving as pastor of a Baptist church. Former members said in 2017 that the Whaleys and others from Spindale visited Martin's church after Martin met Sam Whaley in 1986. The Word of Faith Fellowship eventually developed a greater influence on the church. The church moved to São Joaquim de Bicas in 2005 and many members moved to Betim.

Solange Granieri and Juarez De Souza Oliveira met the Whaleys in São Paulo, and in 1988 they opened Ministerio Evangelico Comunidade Rhema (Rhema Community Evangelical Ministry) in Franco da Rocha. Jane Whaley began visiting the Brazilian churches frequently and members often visit the Spindale church.

On April 27, 2020, an attorney for the church confirmed three members had died of COVID-19 and that it was not known how many had the virus, though the church claimed to be "100 percent compliant" with guidelines released during the pandemic. Because Rutherford County had over 100 cases, a very high number for the population, some people blamed the church for the virus's spread, and the church received threats of violence.

== Worship ==
Word of Faith identifies as a Pentecostal/charismatic body. A 2012 Charlotte Observer article described worship at Word of Faith as "ecstatic [...] Sometimes members hop. Sometimes they speak in tongues. The music and prayer booms through the sanctuary." Jane Whaley, describing the practice, stated that "'God has freed us' to be loud."

== Rules ==
According to the Associated Press, members of the Fellowship follow a list of rules 145 entries long. These rules include:

- Followers do not celebrate birthdays and religious or secular holidays, including Christmas and Easter because they are "pagan".
- Congregants do not watch television and movies, read newspapers, or eat in restaurants that serve alcohol.
- Men and women must swim with shirts covering their upper bodies and cannot take them off in public, including in their own backyards.
- Men cannot grow beards.
- Followers are not allowed to enroll in college without permission and, if permission is granted, can attend only alongside other members so their behavior can be monitored. Whaley also picks their majors, and they must work for the church or a business owned by church leaders once they leave school.
- Whaley's permission is required to buy a house or a car.
- Members must tithe 10% of their gross earnings in addition to contributing to the collection plate.

Current church members have stated this list of rules is inaccurate and has never been published, promulgated, or distributed by the church.

Children in the Fellowship are isolated, monitored and controlled closely by the church, being educated in the church-controlled school, and prevented from watching television under threat of punishment. Children are also told to display a positive attitude, regardless of how they feel.

== Abuse allegations ==
Although a number of critics and former members have described the church as a cult and accused the church of abuse, these accusations are disputed by current members and church officials who claim that through "strong prayer", church fellowship, Biblical teaching, and encouraging community, lives ultimately change.

In 1995, Jane and Sam Whaley denied allegations made by several former members of the TV program Inside Edition. One former student said he had been beaten multiple times by church members to remove a "destructive spirit". Other former members described sitting in a "prayer chair" as former members walked around them shouting prayers.

The church was investigated by the SBI in the 1990s for child abuse, after more than 40 former members gave testimony to the Forest City Daily Courier and other news outlets as to their experiences in the Fellowship. No charges resulted. In 2000, a woman testifying in a child custody case said her one-year-old son was subjected to "blasting", or standing in a circle and loudly praying, sometimes for hours, in order to "drive out demons". She also said her son was beaten enough to cause bruises. Jane Whaley was asked about discipline at her church and said God wanted children to be beaten if that was necessary. Whaley cited Acts 2:2 to justify disciplinary practices, members said.

Jane Whaley was convicted of misdemeanor assault in 2004 as a result of an incident two years earlier where former member Lacy Wien described "blasting" by a group of members, followed by the assault by Whaley. Wien was suing the church for $2.5 million in a separate case. After five years of appeals, the conviction was overturned.

Another former member, Michael Lowry, claimed to have been beaten and held prisoner in 2011 to drive out "gay demons". Lowry testified before a grand jury but in 2013 he rejoined the church, recanting his allegations. Lowry later left the church again and said he stood by his earlier statements.

Former member Jamey Anderson, who joined the Fellowship aged 4, described the treatment by the church that he had undergone, with many former members describing his treatment as some of the harshest anyone suffered. Anderson stated he was frequently sent to a storage area called the green room, and one former member said he was "brutally paddled" after incidents where other children told on him for the minor offenses in school. Anderson also stated that when his grandfather died, he was not allowed to attend the funeral and was left out of the obituary. Anderson also testified to being forced to work, and that in 2002, he and four other boys were punished by being put in a room by themselves to watch Whaley on video during school; Anderson was restricted to his home outside of school. He said after leaving the church, family members who remained members cut off contact. Whaley's attorney denied the allegations and said other members supported Whaley. Anderson's mother and grandmother have stated Jamey was not abused but "they have always deeply loved Jamey" even though he is "spreading lies to paint a horrible picture about his loving family."

An Associated Press investigation included interviews with 43 former members, who told stories of physical abuse resulting in injuries which were not treated, families being separated, and males being held prisoner in a former storage building for as long as a year. Former members described being afraid to leave the church or even oppose Whaley for fear of public reprimand or worse. Children at the church's school were beaten for minor offenses, former members said, even by the other children. The investigation also included numerous documents, and recordings of Whaley made without her knowledge. Whaley denied abuse took place and defended certain practices as being protected by the First Amendment. She refused to be interviewed for the AP investigation, instead accusing former members of lying.

=== Matthew Fenner case ===
In 2017, Matthew Fenner testified that, after he and his family joined the church in 2010, he witnessed members being shouted at for hours to remove "demons". In January 2013, Fenner was allegedly beaten for two hours "to break me free of the homosexual 'demons'", he said in a police affidavit. He said he escaped to the home of his grandparents, who reported the incident to law enforcement. Fenner tried and failed to get law enforcement agencies, including the FBI, to pursue the case. Because Fenner persevered, five church members were indicted in December 2014 and charged with kidnapping and assault. Fenner and his girlfriend at the time of the alleged incident, Danielle Cordes, testified in the trial. Observers have noted that there are "important differences in Fenner's and Cordes's recollections and telling of key events."

In May 2017, Brooke Covington, with whom Fenner lived before his escape, became the first Word of Faith member to go on trial. Because the jury foreman shared documents that were not supposed to be made public, Superior Court Judge Gary Gavenus declared a mistrial and a new trial was scheduled for September 11, 2017. As of October 2017, Covington's trial had not taken place but it would still be in Rutherford County. Four other related cases were moved to Buncombe County. Robert Walker was scheduled to appear in court in October but his case and those of Sarah Anderson, Adam Bartley, and Justin Covington were moved to January 2018.

A month later on June 19, 2017, Matthew Fenner's grandfather Robert Marvin Rape was found dead in his yard from a gunshot wound to the chest. With the North Carolina State Bureau of Investigation's assistance, District Attorney Ted Bell determined the death was a suicide.

On September 28, 2026, Brooke Covington pleaded guilty and was sentenced to two years probation.

=== Brazil ===
The Associated Press found that the churches in Brazil also have the same practices as the Spindale church. Former members claimed that a move by Verbo Vivo and its members was intended to keep them away from the rest of the world. The church and the area where members lived were both surrounded by high fences. In 2009, two of the pastors quit, accusing the church of "brainwashing". A committee of the Minas Gerais state legislature held hearings. John Martin described practices as "guidelines and not prohibitions". Both churches lost many members. For the Associated Press investigation in 2017, over three dozen former members were interviewed and many reported being afraid of what the church would do if they spoke out. Some needed therapy. While the changes in Brazil happened slowly, they were drastic. Some young people were taken to the United States and allegedly required to work at the church or companies owned by members. Some young people were told not to contact their families. One of the rules in Brazil was the banning of soccer. Former students reported being isolated and shouted at for bad behavior.

Three former members said in 2014 to a U.S. Attorney that Brazilians brought to the United States were not paid for their work, while Americans working with them were paid, and that they were beaten if they disobeyed. One former member who left the church in 2016 also said his passport and money were taken away. The federal investigation found no such evidence.

Pastors of the Rhema church told Folha de S.Paulo that the claims were "many lies and distorted facts."

Labor prosecutors sued to shut down the Rhema church. In a March 1, 2018 labor court filing in São Paulo state, prosecutors suggested they had evidence of beating and forced labor in the Rhema church. The case was summarily dismissed in the church's favor, with the judge's finding.

== Other charges ==
On May 11, 2018, Jerry Gross and his son Jason Lee Gross were charged in U.S. District Court. The U.S. attorney's office claimed their business received $150,000 between 2009 and 2013 by claiming they had laid off employees who as a result became eligible for unemployment benefits, when in fact the employees continued to work at the business. Eleven former members claimed in September 2017 that Word of Faith leaders insisted church members take similar actions.

Randy Fields told the Associated Press that during the 2008 economic slowdown, he asked to be able to donate less to the church. Fields said Jane Whaley told him to take fraudulent actions to keep giving 10 percent of his income to the church, calling this "God's plan." The Associated Press found six cases of companies allegedly making fraudulent unemployment claims, in which many of the companies' employees belonged to Word of Faith. Jerry Gross and Jason Gross pled guilty to wire fraud on May 25.

Minister Kent Covington was sentenced to 34 months in prison in April 2019 for conspiracy to commit mail fraud. Diane McKinny pled guilty to making a false claim for unemployment benefits.

The U.S. attorney's office announced in a September 26, 2019 press release that it ended its investigation.

== Documentary ==
The Devil Next Door was originally scheduled to air on A&E on November 27, 2018. According to WLOS-TV, the church asked that the documentary not be aired because some participants were paid. A&E claimed the documentary was postponed due to the need for more information. The church hired attorneys to stop the broadcast, and a church spokesman said the reason for the postponement was "some serious ethical problems with paying participants." A&E had cancelled a documentary about the Ku Klux Klan for similar reasons. In July 2019, "People Magazine Investigates: Word of Faith" aired on the Investigative Discovery cable channel.

== Book ==
Associated Press reporters Mitch Weiss and Holbrook Mohr wrote the book Broken Faith: Inside the Word of Faith Fellowship, One of America's Most Dangerous Cults.

== Support for political candidates ==
In September 2024, The New York Times reported that a group of women members of the church volunteer at campaign events for presidential candidate Donald Trump. The women set up and disassemble the VIP section and handle media sign-in.

Their husbands, when they participate, distribute floor passes and police the VIP areas. In 2022, members of the church donated to and volunteered for the campaign of Madison Cawthorn. In July 2024, members of the church also held a fundraiser for North Carolina gubernatorial Republican nominee Mark Robinson.
