= Pat Cotham =

American politician

Personal details
- Party: Democratic
- Children: Tricia
- Education: University of Missouri (BA)
- Website: Official website

Pat Cotham is a former Mecklenburg Board County Commissioner. During her first term she served as Chair of the Board. She earned a BA in Spanish and a BJ in journalism from the University of Missouri.

She is a trustee to the North Carolina Blumenthal Performing Arts Center, a Democratic National Committee member and a delegate member of the Executive Council of the N.C. Democratic Party. She is an active member of St. Matthew’s Catholic Church, a Democratic Party Precinct leader, past president of the Mecklenburg County Democratic Women, chair of Uptown Democratic Forum and a member of the Charlotte 2012 Host Committee.

She was the 2012 award winner as the "Grassroots Leader of the Year" for the Mecklenburg County Democratic Party. She was also a Democratic Party "superdelegate" in 2016, and endorsed Bernie Sanders for president in June 2016.

Pat Cotham has a daughter, NC Representative Tricia Cotham, a state representative from Matthews, NC.
