= Bobby F. England =

American politician from North Carolina (born 1932)

Bob England

Member of the North Carolina House of Representatives from the 112th district
- In office January 1, 2003 – January 1, 2011
- Preceded by: Constituency established
- Succeeded by: Mike Hager

Personal details
- Born: May 13, 1932 (age 94) Spindale, North Carolina, US
- Party: Democratic
- Education: Wofford College (BS); University of South Carolina (MD)
- Occupation: physician

Military service
- Allegiance: United States
- Branch/service: United States Air Force
- Years of service: 1951–1955

Bobby F. England (born May 13, 1932) is an American former politician. A Democrat, he was a member of the North Carolina General Assembly representing the state's 112th House district, including constituents in Cleveland and Rutherford counties. He was born in Spindale, North Carolina.

In 2009, England was credited with helping to save the life of fellow Rep. Becky Carney who suffered cardiac arrest at the state legislative building.

North Carolina House of Representatives
Preceded by Constituency established	Member of the North Carolina House of Representatives from the 112th district 2003–2011	Succeeded by Mike Hager
