= Spindale, North Carolina =

- Town
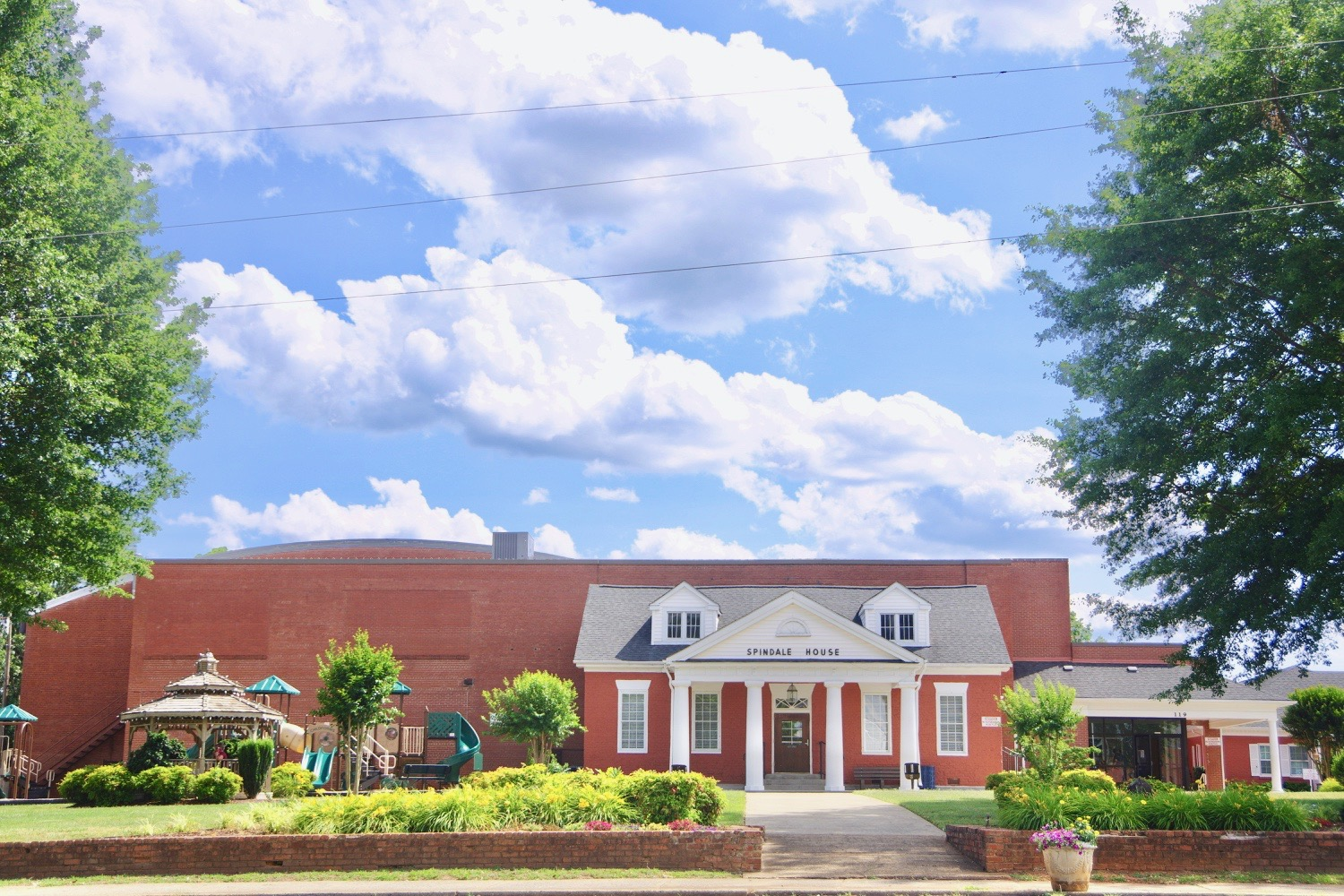
- Spindale House
- Nickname: The Dale
- Motto: Small Town Friendly
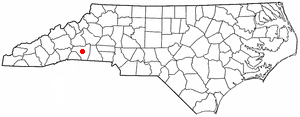
- Location of Spindale, North Carolina
- Coordinates: 35°21′35″N 81°55′24″W
- Country: United States
- State: North Carolina
- County: Rutherford

Area
  - Total: 5.41 sq mi (14.01 km^{2})
  - Land: 5.41 sq mi (14.01 km^{2})
  - Water: 0 sq mi (0.00 km^{2})
- Elevation: 994 ft (303 m)

Population (2020)
  - Total: 4,225
  - Density: 781.3/sq mi (301.66/km^{2})
- Time zone: UTC-5 (Eastern (EST))
  - Summer (DST): UTC-4 (EDT)
- ZIP code: 28160
- Area code: 828
- FIPS code: 37-63880
- GNIS feature ID: 2407383
- Website: www.spindalenc.net

Spindale is a town in Rutherford County, North Carolina, United States. The population was 4,225 at the 2020 census.

== History ==
Spindale originated as a mill town from its first textile mill, Spencer Mills, in 1916, until its last textile mill, Stonecutter Mills, organized by J. B. Tanner in 1920, which closed in 1999. The town of Spindale was incorporated on August 21, 1923. In 1939, the North Carolina General Assembly passed a local act that extended the corporate limits of the town of Spindale, which nearly doubled its size in area.

In 1926, the iconic Spindale House was opened as a community and recreation center and as a memorial building, presented to the town by K. S. Tanner and other members of the Tanner family.

Opening in 1926, a classic landmark of the Spindale mill village was Greene's Grocery Store located on Spindale Street, which stood for over five decades as the number one volume store for many mill families, featuring a home delivery truck service, a credit account system, and a fresh meat market.

The first organized churches in Spindale were First Baptist in 1917, Methodist in 1919, Presbyterian in 1922, and Spencer Baptist in 1926.

In 1930, the Carolina Theater opened on Main Street in Spindale, which could seat 360 patrons and operated until it closed in 1961.

The Spindale Sun newspaper was established in 1941.

== Geography ==
Spindale is located along U.S. Route 221A between Forest City to the southeast and Rutherfordton to the west. U.S. Route 74A passes through the southern part of town.

According to the United States Census Bureau, the town has a total area of 5.5 square miles (14 km^{2}), all of it land.

== Demographics ==
Historical population
Census	Pop.	Note	%±
1930	3,066		—
1940	3,952		28.9%
1950	3,891		−1.5%
1960	4,082		4.9%
1970	3,848		−5.7%
1980	4,246		10.3%
1990	4,040		−4.9%
2000	4,022		−0.4%
2010	4,321		7.4%
2020	4,225		−2.2%
U.S. Decennial Census

=== 2020 census ===
As of the 2020 census, Spindale had a population of 4,225. The median age was 41.0 years. 20.4% of residents were under the age of 18 and 17.4% of residents were 65 years of age or older. For every 100 females there were 106.8 males, and for every 100 females age 18 and over there were 107.5 males age 18 and over.

92.9% of residents lived in urban areas, while 7.1% lived in rural areas.

There were 1,722 households in Spindale, of which 28.0% had children under the age of 18 living in them. Of all households, 29.8% were married-couple households, 22.2% were households with a male householder and no spouse or partner present, and 39.0% were households with a female householder and no spouse or partner present. About 36.3% of all households were made up of individuals and 17.9% had someone living alone who was 65 years of age or older. There were 938 families residing in the town.

There were 1,957 housing units, of which 12.0% were vacant. The homeowner vacancy rate was 1.7% and the rental vacancy rate was 9.1%.

Spindale racial composition
Race	Number	Percentage
White (non-Hispanic)	2,758	65.3%
Black or African American (non-Hispanic)	1,004	23.8%
Native American	26	0.6%
Asian	29	0.7%
Pacific Islander	6	0.1%
Other/Mixed	250	5.9%
Hispanic or Latino	152	3.6%

=== 2000 census ===
At the 2000 census there were 4,022 people, 1,662 households, and 1,065 families in the town. The population density was 726.8 inhabitants per square mile (280.6/km^{2}). There were 1,887 housing units at an average density of 341.0 per square mile (131.7/km^{2}). The racial makeup of the town was 72.8% White, 24.9% African American, 0.5% Native American, 0.6% Asian, 0.5% from other races, and 0.8% from two or more races. Hispanic or Latino of any race were 1.44%.

Of the 1,662 households 25.6% had children under the age of 18 living with them, 43.9% were married couples living together, 14.7% had a female householder with no husband present, and 35.9% were non-families. 33.3% of households were one person and 15.2% were one person aged 65 or older. The average household size was 2.29 and the average family size was 2.87.

The age distribution was 22.2% under the age of 18, 8.2% from 18 to 24, 29.5% from 25 to 44, 22.5% from 45 to 64, and 17.6% 65 or older. The median age was 38 years. For every 100 females, there were 97.7 males. For every 100 females age 18 and over, there were 97.0 males.

The median household income was $23,365 and the median family income was $33,583. Males had a median income of $25,504 versus $20,395 for females. The per capita income for the town was $13,789. About 12.5% of families and 16.5% of the population were below the poverty line, including 21.0% of those under age 18 and 15.9% of those age 65 or over.

== Education ==
Spindale is home to Isothermal Community College, a two-year community college, named for its location in the thermal belt, and a part of the North Carolina Community College System.

== Media ==
WNCW, a noncommercial radio station affiliated with NPR, broadcasts from Isothermal Community College on a frequency of 88.7mhz. WNCW's programming consists of a diverse blend of musical styles. Its eclectic music mix and presence on the World Wide Web attracts listeners well beyond the reach of its coverage area.

== Notable person ==
- Bobby F. England – member of the North Carolina General Assembly

== See also ==
- Word of Faith Fellowship
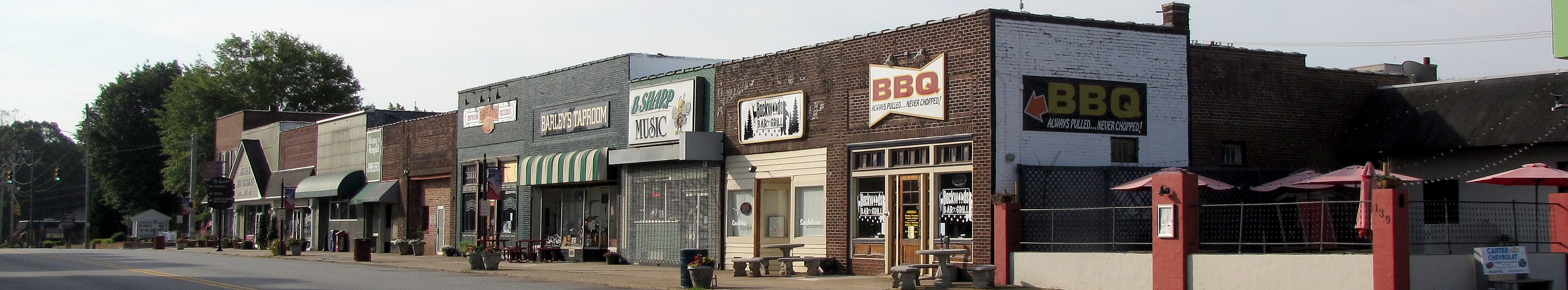
Main Street
