= Isothermal Community College =

Public college in Spindale, North Carolina, US

Coordinates: 35.341788°N 81.904548°W

Isothermal Community College (ICC) is a public community college in Spindale, North Carolina. Named after its location in the thermal belt, an area in the foothills of Western North Carolina with significantly milder temperatures than its immediate neighboring areas, it is part of the North Carolina Community College System.

Isothermal is also the home to the public broadcast station WNCW. The Foundation of the Performing Arts Center at ICC is a community center that hosts plays, concerts, and other events by featured artists and groups. ICC offers several programs, such as Huskins courses in which high school students from the three local high schools can take and attend college courses, and the Rutherford Early College High (REaCH), an alternative high school that combines a college education with high school courses. The school's athletic program is known as the Patriots.

The president, since February 1, 2021, is Margaret Annunziata. Preceding her was Walter Dalton, former lieutenant governor of North Carolina.

== Locations ==
- Rutherford County
