= Mike Hager =

American politician

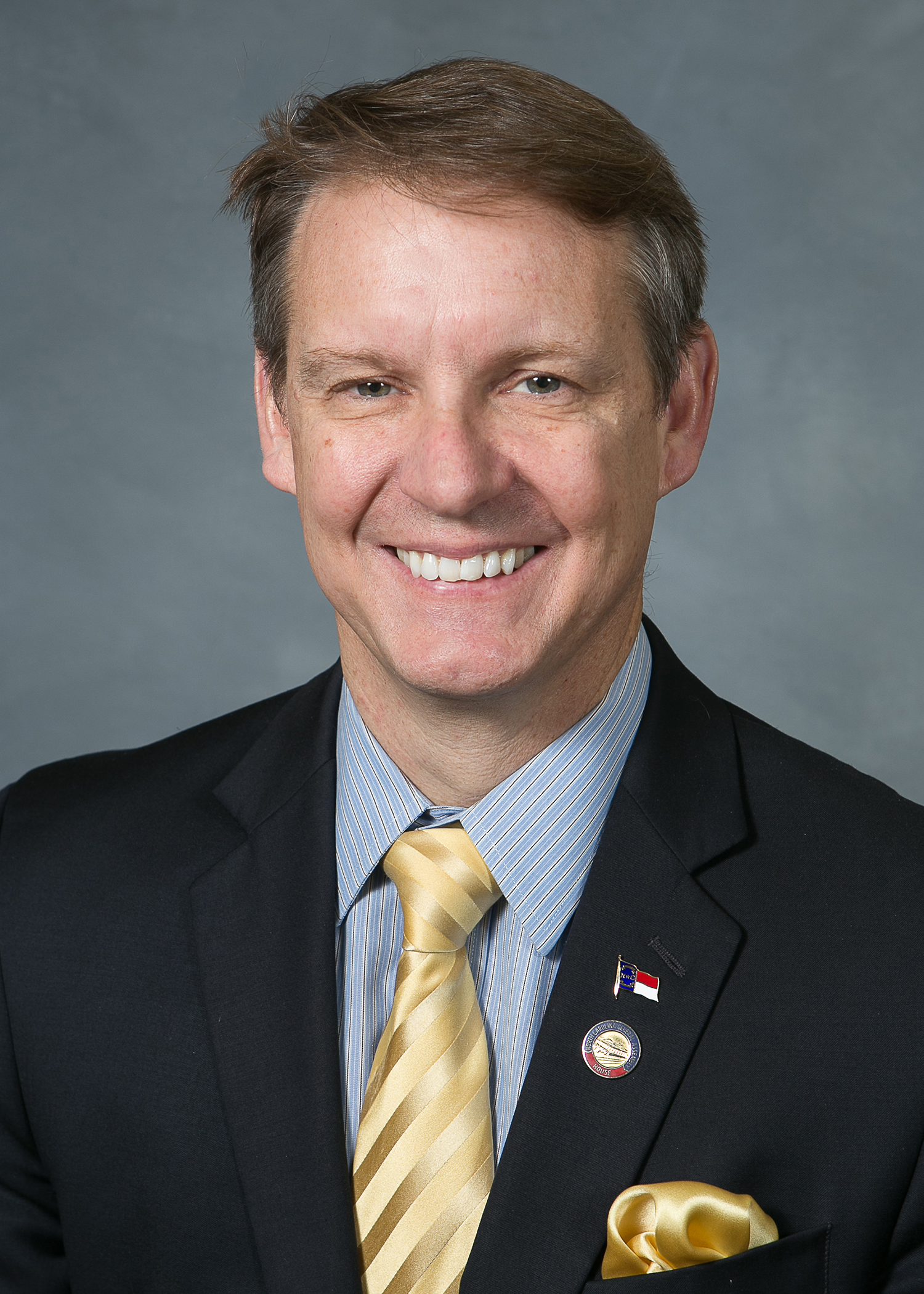

Majority Leader of the North Carolina House of Representatives
- In office January 1, 2015 – August 16, 2016
- Preceded by: Edgar Starnes
- Succeeded by: John Bell

Member of the North Carolina House of Representatives from the 112th district
- In office January 1, 2011 – August 16, 2016
- Preceded by: Bob England
- Succeeded by: David Rogers

Member of the Rutherford County Board of Education from the 1st district
- In office October/November 2019 – December 8, 2020
- Preceded by: Barry Gold
- Succeeded by: Angel King

Personal details
- Born: November 5, 1962 (age 63) South Gastonia, North Carolina
- Party: Republican
- Education: University of North Carolina, Charlotte (BS)

Michael Hager (born November 5, 1962) is an American politician. He served as a Republican member of the North Carolina House of Representatives until August 2016 when he unexpectedly resigned. He represented the 112th district and had served as majority leader since January 2015.

In late 2019, Hager was appointed to fill an unexpired term on the Rutherford County Board of Education. In 2020, he ran for a full term on the board, but was defeated in the Republican primary by retired school administrator Angel King. In October 2025, Hager announced his intention to challenge Representative Jake Johnson in the Republican primary in the 113th House District in 2026.

== Committee assignments ==
=== 2015-2016 session ===
- Public Utilities (Vice Chair)
- Finance (Vice Chair)
- Commerce and Job Development
- Environment
- Judiciary IV
- Regulatory Reform

=== 2013-2014 session ===
- Appropriations
- Public Utilities (Chair)
- Environment (Vice Chair)
- Finance
- Commerce and Job Development
- Banking

=== 2011-2012 session ===
- Appropriations
- Public Utilities (Vice Chair)
- Banking
- Commerce and Job Development
- Education
- Government

== Electoral history ==
=== 2020 ===
Rutherford County Board of Education 1st district Republican primary election, 2020
Party	Candidate	Votes	%
Republican	Angel King	3,652	50.12%
Republican	Mike Hager	2,798	38.40%
Republican	Bruce L. Greene	837	11.49%
Total votes		7,287	100%

=== 2014 ===
North Carolina House of Representatives 112th district general election, 2014
Party	Candidate	Votes	%
Republican	Mike Hager (incumbent)	12,722	58.58%
Democratic	Lisa Harris Bralley	8,997	41.42%
Total votes		21,719	100%
Republican hold			

=== 2012 ===
North Carolina House of Representatives 112th district general election, 2012
Party	Candidate	Votes	%
Republican	Mike Hager (incumbent)	19,593	61.90%
Democratic	Mark Brown	12,059	38.10%
Total votes		31,652	100%
Republican hold			

=== 2010 ===
North Carolina House of Representatives 112th district Republican primary election, 2010
Party	Candidate	Votes	%
Republican	Mike Hager	1,515	43.82%
Republican	Alan Toney	843	24.39%
Republican	Dennis Davis	791	22.88%
Republican	Jim Wayne Newton	308	8.91%
Total votes		3,457	100%

North Carolina House of Representatives 112th district general election, 2010
Party	Candidate	Votes	%
Republican	Mike Hager	13,486	65.18%
Democratic	Jim Proctor	7,203	34.82%
Total votes		20,689	100%
Republican gain from Democratic			

=== 2004 ===
North Carolina House of Representatives 112th district general election, 2004
Party	Candidate	Votes	%
Democratic	Bob England (incumbent)	16,681	61.19%
Republican	Mike Hager	10,171	37.31%
Libertarian	Ralph Haulk	408	1.50%
Total votes		27,260	100%
Democratic hold			

North Carolina House of Representatives
Preceded by Edgar Starnes	Majority Leader of the North Carolina House of Representatives; 2015–2016	Succeeded by John Bell
