= 2006 North Carolina House of Representatives election =

- November 7, 2006

All 120 seats in the North Carolina House of Representatives 61 seats needed for a majority
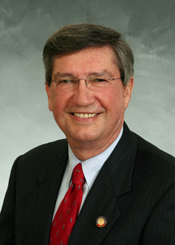

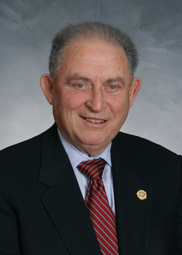
	Majority party	Minority party
Leader	Jim Black	Joe Kiser
Party	Democratic	Republican
Leader since	January 1, 1999	January 1, 2003
Leader's seat	100th - Matthews	97th - Vale
Last election	63	57
Seats won	68	52
Seat change	▲5	▼5
Popular vote	830,642	860,225
Percentage	48.82%	50.55%
- Results: Democratic gain Democratic hold Republican hold
Speaker before election
Jim Black
Democratic
Elected Speaker
Joe Hackney
Democratic

An election was held on November 7, 2006 to elect all 120 members to North Carolina's House of Representatives. The election coincided with elections for other offices, including the U.S. House of Representatives, and state senate. The primary election was held on May 2, 2006 with primary run-offs held on May 30, 2006 and September 12, 2006.

== Results summary ==
District	Incumbent	Party	Elected	Party
1st	Bill Owens	Dem	Bill Owens	Dem
2nd	Timothy Spear	Dem	Timothy Spear	Dem
3rd	Alice Graham Underhill	Dem	Alice Graham Underhill	Dem
4th	Russell Tucker	Dem	Russell Tucker	Dem
5th	Howard Hunter Jr.	Dem	Howard Hunter Jr.	Dem
6th	Arthur Williams	Dem	Arthur Williams	Dem
7th	Ed Jones	Dem	Ed Jones	Dem
8th	Edith Warren	Dem	Edith Warren	Dem
9th	Marian McLawhorn	Dem	Marian McLawhorn	Dem
10th	Stephen LaRoque	Rep	Van Braxton	Dem
11th	Louis Pate	Rep	Louis Pate	Rep
12th	William Wainwright	Dem	William Wainwright	Dem
13th	Jean Preston†	Rep	Pat McElraft	Rep
14th	George Cleveland	Rep	George Cleveland	Rep
15th	Robert Grady	Rep	Robert Grady	Rep
16th	Carolyn Justice	Rep	Carolyn Justice	Rep
17th	Bonner Stiller	Rep	Bonner Stiller	Rep
18th	Thomas Wright	Dem	Thomas Wright	Dem
19th	Danny McComas	Rep	Danny McComas	Rep
20th	Dewey Hill	Dem	Dewey Hill	Dem
21st	Larry Bell	Dem	Larry Bell	Dem
22nd	Edd Nye	Dem	William Brisson	Dem
23rd	Joe Tolson	Dem	Joe Tolson	Dem
24th	Jean Farmer-Butterfield	Dem	Jean Farmer-Butterfield	Dem
25th	Bill Daughtridge	Rep	Bill Daughtridge	Rep
26th	Leo Daughtry	Rep	Leo Daughtry	Rep
27th	Michael Wray	Dem	Michael Wray	Dem
28th	James Langdon Jr.	Rep	James Langdon Jr.	Rep
29th	Larry Hall	Dem	Larry Hall	Dem
30th	Paul Luebke	Dem	Paul Luebke	Dem
31st	Mickey Michaux	Dem	Mickey Michaux	Dem
32nd	Jim Crawford	Dem	Jim Crawford	Dem
33rd	Dan Blue	Dem	Dan Blue	Dem
34th	Grier Martin	Dem	Grier Martin	Dem
35th	Jennifer Weiss	Dem	Jennifer Weiss	Dem
36th	Nelson Dollar	Rep	Nelson Dollar	Rep
37th	Paul Stam	Rep	Paul Stam	Rep
38th	Deborah Ross	Dem	Deborah Ross	Dem
39th	Linda Coleman	Dem	Linda Coleman	Dem
40th	Rick Eddins	Rep	Marilyn Avila	Rep
41st	Russell Capps	Rep	Ty Harrell	Dem
42nd	Marvin Lucas	Dem	Marvin Lucas	Dem
43rd	Mary McAllister	Dem	Mary McAllister	Dem
44th	Margaret Dickson	Dem	Margaret Dickson	Dem
45th	Rick Glazier	Dem	Rick Glazier	Dem
46th	Douglas Yongue	Dem	Douglas Yongue	Dem
47th	Ronnie Sutton	Dem	Ronnie Sutton	Dem
48th	Garland Pierce	Dem	Garland Pierce	Dem
49th	Lucy Allen	Dem	Lucy Allen	Dem
50th	Bill Faison	Dem	Bill Faison	Dem
51st	John Sauls†	Rep	Jimmy Love Sr.	Dem
52nd	Richard Morgan	Rep	Joe Boylan	Rep
53rd	David Lewis	Rep	David Lewis	Rep
54th	Joe Hackney	Dem	Joe Hackney	Dem
55th	Winkie Wilkins	Dem	Winkie Wilkins	Dem
56th	Verla Insko	Dem	Verla Insko	Dem
57th	Pricey Harrison	Dem	Pricey Harrison	Dem
58th	Alma Adams	Dem	Alma Adams	Dem
59th	Maggie Jeffus	Dem	Maggie Jeffus	Dem
60th	Earl Jones	Dem	Earl Jones	Dem
61st	Laura Wiley	Rep	Laura Wiley	Rep
62nd	John Blust	Rep	John Blust	Rep
63rd	Alice Bordsen	Dem	Alice Bordsen	Dem
64th	Cary Allred	Rep	Cary Allred	Rep
65th	Nelson Cole	Dem	Nelson Cole	Dem
66th	Melanie Wade Goodwin	Dem	Melanie Wade Goodwin	Dem
67th	David Almond	Rep	David Almond	Rep
68th	Curtis Blackwood	Rep	Curtis Blackwood	Rep
69th	Pryor Gibson	Dem	Pryor Gibson	Dem
70th	Arlie Culp†	Rep	Pat Hurley	Rep
71st	Larry Womble	Dem	Larry Womble	Dem
72nd	Earline Parmon	Dem	Earline Parmon	Dem
73rd	Larry Brown	Rep	Larry Brown	Rep
74th	Dale Folwell	Rep	Dale Folwell	Rep
75th	Bill McGee	Rep	Bill McGee	Rep
76th	Fred Steen II	Rep	Fred Steen II	Rep
77th	Lorene Coates	Dem	Lorene Coates	Dem
78th	Harold Brubaker	Rep	Harold Brubaker	Rep
79th	Julia Craven Howard	Rep	Julia Craven Howard	Rep
80th	Jerry Dockham	Rep	Jerry Dockham	Rep
81st	Hugh Holliman	Dem	Hugh Holliman	Dem
82nd	Jeff Barnhart	Rep	Jeff Barnhart	Rep
83rd	Linda Johnson	Rep	Linda Johnson	Rep
84th	Phillip Frye	Rep	Phillip Frye	Rep
85th	Mitch Gillespie	Rep	Mitch Gillespie	Rep
86th	Walt Church	Dem	Walt Church	Dem
87th	Edgar Starnes	Rep	Edgar Starnes	Rep
88th	Mark Hollo	Rep	Ray Warren	Dem
89th	Mitchell Setzer	Rep	Mitchell Setzer	Rep
90th	Jim Harrell	Dem	Jim Harrell	Dem
91st	Bryan Holloway	Rep	Bryan Holloway	Rep
92nd	George Holmes	Rep	George Holmes	Rep
93rd	Gene Wilson	Rep	Cullie Tarleton	Dem
94th	Tracy Walker	Rep	Tracy Walker	Rep
95th	Karen Ray	Rep	Karen Ray	Rep
96th	Mark Hilton	Rep	Mark Hilton	Rep
97th	Joe Kiser	Rep	Joe Kiser	Rep
98th	John Rhodes	Rep	Thom Tillis	Rep
99th	Drew Saunders	Dem	Drew Saunders	Dem
100th	Jim Black	Dem	Jim Black	Dem
101st	Beverly Earle	Dem	Beverly Earle	Dem
102nd	Becky Carney	Dem	Becky Carney	Dem
103rd	Jim Gulley	Rep	Jim Gulley	Rep
104th	Ed McMahan†	Rep	Ruth Samuelson	Rep
105th	Doug Vinson†	Rep	Ric Killian	Rep
106th	Martha Alexander	Dem	Martha Alexander	Dem
107th	Pete Cunningham	Dem	Pete Cunningham	Dem
108th	John Rayfield†	Rep	Wil Neumann	Rep
109th	William Current	Rep	William Current	Rep
110th	Debbie Clary	Rep	Debbie Clary	Rep
111th	Tim Moore	Rep	Tim Moore	Rep
112th	Bob England	Dem	Bob England	Dem
113th	Trudi Walend	Rep	Trudi Walend	Rep
114th	Susan Fisher	Dem	Susan Fisher	Dem
115th	Bruce Goforth	Dem	Bruce Goforth	Dem
116th	Wilma Sherrill†	Rep	Charles Thomas	Rep
117th	Carolyn Justus	Rep	Carolyn Justus	Rep
118th	Ray Rapp	Dem	Ray Rapp	Dem
119th	Phil Haire	Dem	Phil Haire	Dem
120th	Roger West	Rep	Roger West	Rep

† - Incumbent not seeking re-election

Party	Candi- dates	Votes		Seats		
Party	Candi- dates	No.	%	No.	+/–	%
Democratic	89	830,642	48.815%	68	▲5	57%
Republican	88	860,225	50.553%	52	▼5	43%
Independent	2	10,757	0.632%	0	Steady	0%
Total	179	1,701,624	100.00%	120	Steady	100.00%

House seats
Democratic	57%
Republican	43%

Popular vote
Republican	50.553%
Democratic	48.815%
Independent	0.632%

=== Incumbents defeated in primary election ===
- Stephen LaRoque (R-District 10), defeated by Willie Ray Starling (R)
- Edd Nye (D-District 22), defeated by William Brisson (D)
- Rick Eddins (R-District 40), defeated by Marilyn Avila (R)
- Richard Morgan (R-District 52), defeated by Joe Boylan (R)
- John Rhodes (R-District 98), defeated by Thom Tillis (R)

=== Incumbents defeated in general election ===
- Russell Capps (R-District 41), defeated by Ty Harrell (D)
- Mark Hollo (R-District 88), defeated by Ray Warren (D)
- Gene Wilson (R-District 93), defeated by Cullie Tarleton (D)

=== Open seats that changed parties ===
- Stephen LaRoque (R-District 10) lost re-nomination, seat won by Van Braxton (D)
- John Sauls (R-District 51) didn't seek re-election, seat won by Jimmy Love Sr. (D)

== Predictions ==
Source	Ranking	As of
Rothenberg	Lean D	November 4, 2006

== Detailed Results ==
=== Districts 1-19 ===
==== District 1 ====
Incumbent Democrat Bill Owens has represented the 1st District since 1995.

North Carolina House of Representatives 1st district general election, 2006
Party	Candidate	Votes	%
Democratic	Bill Owens (incumbent)	12,446	100%
Total votes		12,446	100%
Democratic hold			

==== District 2 ====
Incumbent Democrat Timothy Spear has represented the 2nd district since 2006.

North Carolina House of Representatives 2nd district general election, 2006
Party	Candidate	Votes	%
Democratic	Timothy Spear (incumbent)	12,193	68.73%
Republican	Daniel M. Beall	5,547	31.27%
Total votes		17,740	100%
Democratic hold			

==== District 3 ====
Incumbent Democrat Alice Graham Underhill has represented the 3rd district since 2005.

North Carolina House of Representatives 3rd district general election, 2006
Party	Candidate	Votes	%
Democratic	Alice Graham Underhill (incumbent)	10,772	55.70%
Republican	Michael Speciale	8,568	44.30%
Total votes		19,340	100%
Democratic hold			

==== District 4 ====
Incumbent Democrat Russell Tucker has represented the 4th district since 2005.

North Carolina House of Representatives 4th district general election, 2006
Party	Candidate	Votes	%
Democratic	Russell Tucker (incumbent)	6,844	63.20%
Republican	Richard J. Kaiser	3,985	36.80%
Total votes		10,829	100%
Democratic hold			

==== District 5 ====
Incumbent Democrat Howard Hunter Jr. has represented the 5th district since 1989.

North Carolina House of Representatives 5th district general election, 2006
Party	Candidate	Votes	%
Democratic	Howard Hunter Jr. (incumbent)	8,125	64.27%
Republican	Kyle Jones	4,516	35.73%
Total votes		12,641	100%
Democratic hold			

==== District 6 ====
Incumbent Democrat Arthur Williams has represented the 6th district since 2003.

North Carolina House of Representatives 6th district general election, 2006
Party	Candidate	Votes	%
Democratic	Arthur Williams (incumbent)	10,716	62.73%
Republican	Hood Richardson	6,368	37.27%
Total votes		17,084	100%
Democratic hold			

==== District 7 ====
Incumbent Democrat Ed Jones has represented the 7th district since his appointment on April 5, 2005. Jones was elected to a full term

North Carolina House of Representatives 7th district general election, 2006
Party	Candidate	Votes	%
Democratic	Ed Jones (incumbent)	7,264	100%
Total votes		7,264	100%
Democratic hold			

==== District 8 ====
Incumbent Democrat Edith Warren has represented the 8th district and its predecessors since 1999.

North Carolina House of Representatives 8th district general election, 2006
Party	Candidate	Votes	%
Democratic	Edith Warren (incumbent)	8,843	100%
Total votes		8,843	100%
Democratic hold			

==== District 9 ====
Incumbent Democrat Marian McLawhorn has represented the 9th district since 1999.

North Carolina House of representatives 9th district general election, 2006
Party	Candidate	Votes	%
Democratic	Marian McLawhorn (incumbent)	8,424	56.75%
Republican	Tony Moore	6,419	43.25%
Total votes		14,843	100%
Democratic hold			

==== District 10 ====
Incumbent Republican Stephen LaRoque has represented the 10th district since 2003. LaRoque lost re-nomination to fellow Republican Wille Ray Starling. Starling lost the general election to Democrat Van Braxton.

North Carolina House of Representatives 10th district general election, 2006
Party	Candidate	Votes	%
Democratic	Van Braxton	7,699	55.01%
Republican	Willie Ray Starling	6,296	44.99%
Total votes		13,995	100%
Democratic gain from Republican			

==== District 11 ====
Incumbent Republican Louis Pate has represented the 11th district since 2003.

North Carolina House of Representatives 11th district general election, 2006
Party	Candidate	Votes	%
Republican	Louis Pate (incumbent)	9,016	65.50%
Democratic	Ronnie Griffin	4,749	34.50%
Total votes		13,765	100%
Republican hold			

==== District 12 ====
Incumbent Democrat William Wainwright has represented the 12th district and its predecessors since 1991.

North Carolina House of Representatives 12th district general election, 2006
Party	Candidate	Votes	%
Democratic	William Wainwright (incumbent)	7,941	66.28%
Republican	John Percy Wetherington, Jr.	4,040	33.72%
Total votes		11,981	100%
Democratic hold			

==== District 13 ====
Incumbent Republican Jean Preston has represented the 13th district and its predecessors since 1993. Preston ran for the State Senate and fellow Republican Pat McElraft won the open seat.

North Carolina House of Representatives 13th district general election, 2006
Party	Candidate	Votes	%
Republican	Pat McElraft	14,304	58.37%
Democratic	G. Malcolm Fulcher, Jr.	10,201	41.63%
Total votes		24,505	100%
Republican hold			

==== District 14 ====
Incumbent Republican George Cleveland has represented the 14th district since 2005.

North Carolina House of Representatives 14th district general election, 2006
Party	Candidate	Votes	%
Republican	George Cleveland (incumbent)	5,238	58.05%
Democratic	Kever M. Clark	3,785	41.95%
Total votes		9,023	100%
Republican hold			

==== District 15 ====
Incumbent Republican Robert Grady has represented the 15th district and its predecessors since 1987.

North Carolina House of Representatives 15th district general election, 2006
Party	Candidate	Votes	%
Republican	Robert Grady (incumbent)	3,920	61.88%
Democratic	Jean Hawley	2,415	38.12%
Total votes		6,335	100%
Republican hold			

==== District 16 ====
Incumbent Republican Carolyn Justice has represented the 16th district since 2003.

North Carolina House of Representatives 16th district general election, 2006
Party	Candidate	Votes	%
Republican	Carolyn Justice (incumbent)	14,918	100%
Total votes		14,918	100%
Republican hold			

==== District 17 ====
Incumbent Republican Bonner Stiller has represented the 17th district since 2003.

North Carolina House of representatives 17th district general election, 2006
Party	Candidate	Votes	%
Republican	Bonner Stiller (incumbent)	14,619	62.32%
Democratic	Allan Dameron	8,838	37.68%
Total votes		23,457	100%
Republican hold			

==== District 18 ====
Incumbent Democrat Thomas Wright has represented the 18th district and its predecessors since 1993.

North Carolina House of Representatives 18th district general election, 2006
Party	Candidate	Votes	%
Democratic	Thomas Wright (incumbent)	8,007	63.56%
Republican	Frankie Roberts	4,590	36.44%
Total votes		12,597	100%
Democratic hold			

==== District 19 ====
Incumbent Republican Danny McComas has represented the 19th district and its predecessors since 1995.

North Carolina House of Representatives 19th district general election, 2006
Party	Candidate	Votes	%
Republican	Danny McComas (incumbent)	14,850	100%
Total votes		14,850	100%
Republican hold			

=== Districts 20-39 ===
==== District 20 ====
Incumbent Democrat Dewey Hill has represented the 20th district and its predecessors since 1993.

North Carolina House of Representatives 20th district general election, 2006
Party	Candidate	Votes	%
Democratic	Dewey Hill (incumbent)	10,164	62.78%
Republican	R. C. (Ray) Gilbert	6,026	37.22%
Total votes		16,190	100%
Democratic hold			

==== District 21 ====
Incumbent Democrat Larry Bell has represented the 21st district and its predecessors since 2001.

North Carolina House of Representatives 21st district general election, 2006
Party	Candidate	Votes	%
Democratic	Larry Bell (incumbent)	9,215	100%
Total votes		9,215	100%
Democratic hold			

==== District 22 ====
Incumbent Democrat Edd Nye has represented the 22nd district and its predecessors since 1985. Nye lost re-nomination to fellow Democrat William Brisson. Brisson won the general election unopposed.

North Carolina House of Representatives 22nd district general election, 2006
Party	Candidate	Votes	%
Democratic	William Brisson	10,267	100%
Total votes		10,267	100%
Democratic hold			

==== District 23 ====
Incumbent Democrat Joe Tolson has represented the 23rd district and its predecessors since 1997.

North Carolina House of Representatives 23rd district general election, 2006
Party	Candidate	Votes	%
Democratic	Joe Tolson (incumbent)	7,924	71.05%
Republican	Henry Williams, II	3,228	28.95%
Total votes		11,152	100%
Democratic hold			

==== District 24 ====
Incumbent Democrat Jean Farmer-Butterfield has represented the 24th district since 2003.

North Carolina House of Representatives 24th district general election, 2006
Party	Candidate	Votes	%
Democratic	Jean Farmer-Butterfield (incumbent)	7,987	100%
Total votes		7,987	100%
Democratic hold			

==== District 25 ====
Incumbent Republican Bill Daughtridge has represented the 25th district since 2003.

North Carolina House of Representatives 25th district general election, 2006
Party	Candidate	Votes	%
Republican	Bill Daughtridge (incumbent)	8,444	61.58%
Democratic	Carnell Taylor	5,268	38.42%
Total votes		13,712	100%
Republican hold			

==== District 26 ====
Incumbent Republican Leo Daughtry has represented the 26th district and its predecessors since 1993.

North Carolina House of Representatives 26th district general election, 2006
Party	Candidate	Votes	%
Republican	Leo Daughtry (incumbent)	12,169	100%
Total votes		12,169	100%
Republican hold			

==== District 27 ====
Incumbent Democrat Michael Wray has represented the 27th district since 2005.

North Carolina House of Representatives 27th district general election, 2006
Party	Candidate	Votes	%
Democratic	Michael Wray (incumbent)	13,839	100%
Total votes		13,839	100%
Democratic hold			

==== District 28 ====
Incumbent Republican James Langdon Jr. has represented the 28th district since 2005.

North Carolina House of Representatives 28th district general election, 2006
Party	Candidate	Votes	%
Republican	James Langdon Jr. (incumbent)	12,687	100%
Total votes		12,687	100%
Republican hold			

==== District 29 ====
Incumbent Democrat Larry Hall has represented the 29th district since his appointment in 2006. Hall was elected to a full term.

North Carolina House of Representatives 29th district general election, 2006
Party	Candidate	Votes	%
Democratic	Larry Hall (incumbent)	13,295	100%
Total votes		13,295	100%
Democratic hold			

==== District 30 ====
Incumbent Democrat Paul Luebke has represented the 30th district and its predecessors since 1991.

North Carolina House of Representatives 30th district general election, 2006
Party	Candidate	Votes	%
Democratic	Paul Luebke (incumbent)	12,033	100%
Total votes		12,033	100%
Democratic hold			

==== District 31 ====
Incumbent Democrat Mickey Michaux has represented the 31st district and its predecessors since 1985.

North Carolina House of Representatives 31st district general election, 2006
Party	Candidate	Votes	%
Democratic	Mickey Michaux (incumbent)	11,555	100%
Total votes		11,555	100%
Democratic hold			

==== District 32 ====
Incumbent Democrat Jim Crawford has represented the 32nd district and its predecessors since 1995.

North Carolina House of Representatives 32nd district general election, 2006
Party	Candidate	Votes	%
Democratic	Jim Crawford (incumbent)	10,531	100%
Total votes		10,531	100%
Democratic hold			

==== District 33 ====
Incumbent Democrat Bernard Allen has represented the 33rd district since 2003.

North Carolina House of Representatives 33rd district general election, 2006
Party	Candidate	Votes	%
Democratic	Bernard Allen (incumbent)	12,566	100%
Total votes		12,566	100%
Democratic hold			

==== District 34 ====
Incumbent Democrat Grier Martin has represented the 34th district since 2005.

North Carolina House of Representatives 34th district general election, 2006
Party	Candidate	Votes	%
Democratic	Grier Martin (incumbent)	13,596	59.13%
Republican	J. H. Ross	9,396	40.87%
Total votes		22,992	100%
Democratic hold			

==== District 35 ====
Incumbent Democrat Jennifer Weiss has represented the 35th district and its predecessors since 1999.

North Carolina House of Representatives 35th district general election, 2006
Party	Candidate	Votes	%
Democratic	Jennifer Weiss (incumbent)	13,157	100%
Total votes		13,157	100%
Democratic hold			

==== District 36 ====
Incumbent Republican Nelson Dollar has represented the 36th district since 2005.

North Carolina House of Representatives 36th district general election, 2006
Party	Candidate	Votes	%
Republican	Nelson Dollar (incumbent)	12,305	50.69%
Democratic	Greer Beaty	11,970	49.31%
Total votes		24,275	100%
Republican hold			

==== District 37 ====
Incumbent Republican Paul Stam has represented the 37th district since 2003.

North Carolina House of Representatives 37th district general election, 2006
Party	Candidate	Votes	%
Republican	Paul Stam (incumbent)	15,459	57.07%
Democratic	Ed Ridpath	11,628	42.93%
Total votes		27,087	100%
Republican hold			

==== District 38 ====
Incumbent Democrat Deborah Ross has represented the 38th district since 2003.

North Carolina House of Representatives 38th district general election, 2006
Party	Candidate	Votes	%
Democratic	Deborah Ross (incumbent)	11,819	100%
Total votes		11,819	100%
Democratic hold			

==== District 39 ====
Incumbent Democrat Linda Coleman has represented the 39th district since 2005.

North Carolina House of Representatives 39th district general election, 2006
Party	Candidate	Votes	%
Democratic	Linda Coleman (incumbent)	11,737	58.73%
Republican	John W. Blackwell	8,246	41.27%
Total votes		19,983	100%
Democratic hold			

=== Districts 40-59 ===
==== District 40 ====
Incumbent Republican Rick Eddins has represented the 40th district and its predecessors since 1995. Eddins lost re-nomination to fellow Republican Marilyn Avila. Avila was unopposed in the general election.

North Carolina House of Representatives 40th district general election, 2006
Party	Candidate	Votes	%
Republican	Marilyn Avila	20,556	100%
Total votes		20,556	100%
Republican hold			

==== District 41 ====
Incumbent Republican Russell Capps has represented the 41st district and its predecessors since 1995. Capps lost re-election to Democrat Ty Harrell.

North Carolina House of Representatives 41st district general election, 2006
Party	Candidate	Votes	%
Democratic	Ty Harrell	13,051	51.64%
Republican	Russell Capps (incumbent)	12,224	48.36%
Total votes		25,275	100%
Democratic gain from Republican			

==== District 42 ====
Incumbent Democrat Marvin Lucas has represented the 42nd district and its predecessors since 2001.

North Carolina House of Representatives 42nd district general election, 2006
Party	Candidate	Votes	%
Democratic	Marvin Lucas (incumbent)	5,610	100%
Total votes		5,610	100%
Democratic hold			

==== District 43 ====
Incumbent Democrat Mary McAllister has represented the 43rd district and its predecessors since 1991.

North Carolina House of Representatives 43rd district general election, 2006
Party	Candidate	Votes	%
Democratic	Mary McAllister (incumbent)	5,645	100%
Total votes		5,645	100%
Democratic hold			

==== District 44 ====
Incumbent Democrat Margaret Dickson has represented the 44th district and its predecessors since 2003

North Carolina House of Representatives 44th district general election, 2006
Party	Candidate	Votes	%
Democratic	Margaret Dickson (incumbent)	8,648	100%
Total votes		8,648	100%
Democratic hold			

==== District 45 ====
Incumbent Democrat Rick Glazier has represented the 45th district since 2003.

North Carolina House of Representatives 45th district general election, 2006
Party	Candidate	Votes	%
Democratic	Rick Glazier (incumbent)	6,990	52.30%
Republican	Alex Warner	6,375	47.70%
Total votes		13,365	100%
Democratic hold			

==== District 46 ====
Incumbent Democrat Douglas Yongue has represented the 46th district and its predecessors since 1994.

North Carolina House of Representatives 46th district general election, 2006
Party	Candidate	Votes	%
Democratic	Douglas Yongue (incumbent)	7,684	100%
Total votes		7,684	100%
Democratic hold			

==== District 47 ====
Incumbent Democrat Ronnie Sutton has represented the 47th district since 1995.

North Carolina House of Representatives 47th district general election, 2006
Party	Candidate	Votes	%
Democratic	Ronnie Sutton (incumbent)	5,791	100%
Total votes		5,791	100%
Democratic hold			

==== District 48 ====
Incumbent Democrat Garland Pierce has represented the 48th district since 2005.

North Carolina House of Representatives 48th district general election, 2006
Party	Candidate	Votes	%
Democratic	Garland Pierce (incumbent)	8,714	100%
Total votes		8,714	100%
Democratic hold			

==== District 49 ====
Incumbent Democrat Lucy Allen has represented the 49th district since 2003.

North Carolina House of Representatives 49th district general election, 2006
Party	Candidate	Votes	%
Democratic	Lucy Allen (incumbent)	9,173	59.22%
Republican	Dave Harker	6,316	40.78%
Total votes		15,489	100%
Democratic hold			

==== District 50 ====
Incumbent Democrat Bill Faison has represented the 50th district since 2005.

North Carolina House of Representatives 50th district general election, 2006
Party	Candidate	Votes	%
Democratic	Bill Faison (incumbent)	12,516	100%
Total votes		12,516	100%
Democratic hold			

==== District 51 ====
Incumbent Republican John Sauls has represented the 51st district since 2003. Sauls didn't seek re-election and Democrat Jimmy Love Sr. won the open seat.

North Carolina House of Representatives 51st district general election, 2006
Party	Candidate	Votes	%
Democratic	Jimmy Love Sr.	8,724	54.16%
Republican	Tim McNeill	7,383	45.84%
Total votes		16,107	100%
Democratic gain from Republican			

==== District 52 ====
Incumbent Republican Richard Morgan has represented the 52nd district and its predecessors since 1991. Morgan lost re-nomination to fellow Republican Joe Boylan. Boylan won the open seat.

North Carolina House of Representatives 52nd district general election, 2006
Party	Candidate	Votes	%
Republican	Joe Boylan	8,250	43.41%
Independent	Gerald L. Galloway	6,799	35.77%
Independent	Manila G. (Bud) Shaver	3,958	20.82%
Total votes		19,007	100%
Republican hold			

==== District 53 ====
Incumbent Republican David Lewis has represented the 53rd district since 2003.

North Carolina House of Representatives 53rd district general election, 2006
Party	Candidate	Votes	%
Republican	David Lewis (incumbent)	7,763	53.14%
Democratic	Frank Stewart	6,846	46.86%
Total votes		14,609	100%
Republican hold			

==== District 54 ====
Incumbent Democratic Majority Leader Joe Hackney has represented the 54th district and its predecessors since 1981.

North Carolina House of Representatives 54th district general election, 2006
Party	Candidate	Votes	%
Democratic	Joe Hackney (incumbent)	15,649	69.78%
Republican	Alvin Reed	6,776	30.22%
Total votes		22,425	100%
Democratic hold			

==== District 55 ====
Incumbent Democrat Winkie Wilkins has represented the 55th district since 2005.

North Carolina House of Representatives 55th district general election, 2006
Party	Candidate	Votes	%
Democratic	Winkie Wilkins (incumbent)	14,319	100%
Total votes		14,319	100%
Democratic hold			

==== District 56 ====
Incumbent Democrat Verla Insko has represented the 56th district and its predecessors since 1997.

North Carolina House of Representatives 56th district general election, 2006
Party	Candidate	Votes	%
Democratic	Verla Insko (incumbent)	14,472	100%
Total votes		14,472	100%
Democratic hold			

==== District 57 ====
Incumbent Democrat Pricey Harrison has represented the 57th district since 2005.

North Carolina House of Representatives 57th district general election, 2006
Party	Candidate	Votes	%
Democratic	Pricey Harrison (incumbent)	9,897	63.05%
Republican	Ron Styers	5,799	36.95%
Total votes		15,696	100%
Democratic hold			

==== District 58 ====
Incumbent Democrat Alma Adams has represented the 58th district and its predecessors since 1994.

North Carolina House of Representatives 58th district general election, 2006
Party	Candidate	Votes	%
Democratic	Alma Adams (incumbent)	10,391	65.63%
Republican	Olga Morgan Wright	5,441	34.37%
Total votes		15,832	100%
Democratic hold			

==== District 59 ====
Incumbent Democrat Maggie Jeffus has represented the 59th district since 1991.

North Carolina House of Representatives 58th district general election, 2006
Party	Candidate	Votes	%
Democratic	Maggie Jeffus (incumbent)	10,044	59.48%
Republican	Jim Rumley	6,843	40.52%
Total votes		16,887	100%
Democratic hold			

=== Districts 60-79 ===
==== District 60 ====
Incumbent Democrat Earl Jones has represented the 60th district since 2003.

North Carolina House of Representatives 58th district general election, 2006
Party	Candidate	Votes	%
Democratic	Earl Jones (incumbent)	6,417	59.96%
Republican	Bill Wright	4,285	40.04%
Total votes		10,702	100%
Democratic hold			

==== District 61 ====
Incumbent Republican Laura Wiley has represented the 61st District since 2005.

North Carolina House of Representatives 61st district general election, 2006
Party	Candidate	Votes	%
Republican	Laura Wiley (incumbent)	12,342	100%
Total votes		12,342	100%
Republican hold			

==== District 62 ====
Incumbent Republican John Blust has represented the 62nd District and its predecessors since 2001.

North Carolina House of Representatives 62nd district general election, 2006
Party	Candidate	Votes	%
Republican	John Blust (incumbent)	16,116	100%
Total votes		16,116	100%
Republican hold			

==== District 63 ====
Incumbent Democrat Alice Bordsen has represented the 63rd District since 2003.

North Carolina House of Representatives 63rd district general election, 2006
Party	Candidate	Votes	%
Democratic	Alice Bordsen (incumbent)	8,105	100%
Total votes		8,105	100%
Democratic hold			

==== District 64 ====
Incumbent Republican Cary Allred has represented the 64th District and its predecessors since 1995.

North Carolina House of Representatives 64th district general election, 2006
Party	Candidate	Votes	%
Republican	Cary Allred (incumbent)	12,320	100%
Total votes		12,320	100%
Republican hold			

==== District 65 ====
Incumbent Democrat Nelson Cole has represented the 65th District since and its predecessors since 1997.

North Carolina House of Representatives 65th district general election, 2006
Party	Candidate	Votes	%
Democratic	Nelson Cole (incumbent)	9,749	66.56%
Republican	Michael Moore	4,897	33.44%
Total votes		14,646	100%
Democratic hold			

==== District 66 ====
Incumbent Democrat Melanie Wade Goodwin has represented the 66th District since 2005.

North Carolina House of Representatives 66th district general election, 2006
Party	Candidate	Votes	%
Democratic	Melanie Wade Goodwin (incumbent)	9,578	70.55%
Republican	David Browder	3,999	29.45%
Total votes		13,577	100%
Democratic hold			

==== District 67 ====
Incumbent Republican David Almond has represented the 67th District since 2005.

North Carolina House of Representatives 67th district general election, 2006
Party	Candidate	Votes	%
Republican	David Almond (incumbent)	13,788	100%
Total votes		13,788	100%
Republican hold			

==== District 68 ====
Incumbent Republican Curtis Blackwood has represented the 68th District since 2003.

North Carolina House of Representatives 68th district general election, 2006
Party	Candidate	Votes	%
Republican	Curtis Blackwood (incumbent)	16,837	100%
Total votes		16,837	100%
Republican hold			

==== District 69 ====
Incumbent Democrat Pryor Gibson has represented the 69th district and its predecessors since 1999.

North Carolina House of Representatives 69th district general election, 2006
Party	Candidate	Votes	%
Democratic	Pryor Gibson (incumbent)	8,616	66.66%
Republican	Jim H. Bention, Sr.	4,309	33.34%
Total votes		12,925	100%
Democratic hold			

==== District 70 ====
Incumbent Republican Arlie Culp has represented the 70th District since 1989. Culp didn't seek re-election. Republican Pat Hurley won the open seat.

North Carolina House of Representatives 70th district general election, 2006
Party	Candidate	Votes	%
Republican	Pat Hurley	8,756	64.77%
Democratic	Hampton (Happy) Spivey	4,762	35.23%
Total votes		13,518	100%
Republican hold			

==== District 71 ====
Incumbent Democrat Larry Womble has represented the 71st District and its predecessors since 1995.

North Carolina House of Representatives 71st district general election, 2006
Party	Candidate	Votes	%
Democratic	Larry Womble (incumbent)	7,101	100%
Total votes		7,101	100%
Democratic hold			

==== District 72 ====
Incumbent Democrat Earline Parmon has represented the 72nd District since 2003.

North Carolina House of Representatives 72nd district general election, 2006
Party	Candidate	Votes	%
Democratic	Earline Parmon (incumbent)	7,971	100%
Total votes		7,971	100%
Democratic hold			

==== District 73 ====
Incumbent Republican Larry Brown has represented the 73rd district since 2005.

North Carolina House of Representatives 73rd district general election, 2006
Party	Candidate	Votes	%
Republican	Larry Brown (incumbent)	11,432	100%
Total votes		11,432	100%
Republican hold			

==== District 74 ====
Incumbent Republican Dale Folwell has represented the 74th District since 2005.

North Carolina House of Representatives 74th district general election, 2006
Party	Candidate	Votes	%
Republican	Dale Folwell (incumbent)	13,942	100%
Total votes		13,942	100%
Republican hold			

==== District 75 ====
Incumbent Republican Bill McGee has represented the 75th District and its predecessors since 2003.

North Carolina House of Representatives 75th district general election, 2006
Party	Candidate	Votes	%
Republican	Bill McGee (incumbent)	12,893	100%
Total votes		12,893	100%
Republican hold			

==== District 76 ====
Incumbent Republican Fred Steen II has represented the 76th District since 2004.

North Carolina House of Representatives 76th district general election, 2006
Party	Candidate	Votes	%
Republican	Fred Steen II (incumbent)	9,457	100%
Total votes		9,457	100%
Republican hold			

==== District 77 ====
Incumbent Democrat Lorene Coates has represented the 77th District since and its predecessors since 2001.

North Carolina House of Representatives 77th district general election, 2006
Party	Candidate	Votes	%
Democratic	Lorene Coates (incumbent)	8,279	61.68%
Republican	Susan Morris	5,144	38.32%
Total votes		13,423	100%
Democratic hold			

==== District 78 ====
Incumbent Republican Harold Brubaker has represented the 78th District and its predecessors since 1977.

North Carolina House of Representatives 78th district general election, 2006
Party	Candidate	Votes	%
Republican	Harold Brubaker (incumbent)	10,472	100%
Total votes		10,472	100%
Republican hold			

==== District 79 ====
Incumbent Republican Julia Craven Howard has represented the 79th District and its predecessors since 1989.

North Carolina House of Representatives 79th district general election, 2006
Party	Candidate	Votes	%
Republican	Julia Craven Howard (incumbent)	12,553	100%
Total votes		12,553	100%
Republican hold			

=== Districts 80-99 ===
==== District 80 ====
Incumbent Republican Jerry Dockham has represented the 80th district and its predecessors since 1991.

North Carolina House of Representatives 80th district general election, 2006
Party	Candidate	Votes	%
Republican	Jerry Dockham (incumbent)	10,801	100%
Total votes		10,801	100%
Republican hold			

==== District 81 ====
Incumbent Democrat Hugh Holliman has represented the 81st District and its predecessors since 2001.

North Carolina House of Representatives 81st district general election, 2006
Party	Candidate	Votes	%
Democratic	Hugh Holliman (incumbent)	8,454	100%
Total votes		8,454	100%
Democratic hold			

==== District 82 ====
Incumbent Republican Jeff Barnhart has represented the 82nd District since 2001.

North Carolina House of Representatives 82nd district general election, 2006
Party	Candidate	Votes	%
Republican	Jeff Barnhart (incumbent)	11,298	100%
Total votes		11,298	100%
Republican hold			

==== District 83 ====
Incumbent Republican Linda Johnson has represented the 83rd District and its predecessors since 2001.

North Carolina House of Representatives 83rd district general election, 2006
Party	Candidate	Votes	%
Republican	Linda Johnson (incumbent)	10,947	100%
Total votes		10,947	100%
Republican hold			

==== District 84 ====
Incumbent Republican Phillip Frye has represented the 84th district since 2003.

North Carolina House of Representatives 84th district general election, 2006
Party	Candidate	Votes	%
Republican	Phillip Frye (incumbent)	13,150	100%
Total votes		13,150	100%
Republican hold			

==== District 85 ====
Incumbent Republican Mitch Gillespie has represented the 85th District since 1999.

North Carolina House of Representatives 85th district general election, 2006
Party	Candidate	Votes	%
Republican	Mitch Gillespie (incumbent)	8,899	54.07%
Democratic	Chuck Aldridge	7,560	45.93%
Total votes		16,459	100%
Republican hold			

==== District 86 ====
Incumbent Republican Walt Church has represented the 86th District and its predecessors since 1993.

North Carolina House of Representatives 86th district general election, 2006
Party	Candidate	Votes	%
Democratic	Walt Church (incumbent)	8,369	51.50%
Republican	Hugh Blackwell	7,883	48.50%
Total votes		16,252	100%
Democratic hold			

==== District 87 ====
Incumbent Republican Edgar Starnes has represented the 87th District and its predecessors since 1997.

North Carolina House of Representatives 87th district general election, 2006
Party	Candidate	Votes	%
Republican	Edgar Starnes (incumbent)	11,548	100%
Total votes		11,548	100%
Republican hold			

==== District 88 ====
Incumbent Republican Mark Hollo has represented the 88th district since 2005. Hollo lost re-election to Democrat Ray Warren.

North Carolina House of Representatives 88th district general election, 2006
Party	Candidate	Votes	%
Democratic	Ray Warren	9,650	52.61%
Republican	Mark Hollo (incumbent)	8,693	47.39%
Total votes		18,343	100%
Democratic gain from Republican			

==== District 89 ====
Incumbent Republican Mitchell Setzer has represented the 89th District and its predecessors since 1999.

North Carolina House of Representatives 89th district general election, 2006
Party	Candidate	Votes	%
Republican	Mitchell Setzer (incumbent)	11,301	100%
Total votes		11,301	100%
Republican hold			

==== District 90 ====
Incumbent Democrat Jim Harrell has represented the 90th District since 2003.

North Carolina House of Representatives 90th district general election, 2006
Party	Candidate	Votes	%
Democratic	Jim Harrell (incumbent)	9,533	60.93%
Republican	Jack Conway	6,114	39.07%
Total votes		15,647	100%
Democratic hold			

==== District 91 ====
Incumbent Republican Bryan Holloway has represented the 91st District since 2005.

North Carolina House of Representatives 91st district general election, 2006
Party	Candidate	Votes	%
Republican	Bryan Holloway (incumbent)	10,295	61.61%
Democratic	Ed Gambill	6,416	38.39%
Total votes		16,711	100%
Republican hold			

==== District 92 ====
Incumbent Republican George Holmes has represented the 92nd district and its predecessors since 1979.

North Carolina House of Representatives 92nd district general election, 2006
Party	Candidate	Votes	%
Republican	George Holmes (incumbent)	10,664	100%
Total votes		10,664	100%
Republican hold			

==== District 93 ====
Incumbent Republican Gene Wilson has represented the 93rd district and its predecessors since 1995. Wilson lost re-election to Democrat Cullie Tarleton.

North Carolina House of Representatives 93rd district general election, 2006
Party	Candidate	Votes	%
Democratic	Cullie Tarleton	13,414	54.79%
Republican	Gene Wilson (incumbent)	11,069	45.21%
Total votes		24,483	100%
Democratic gain from Republican			

==== District 94 ====
Incumbent Republican Tracy Walker has represented the 94th District and its predecessors since 2001.

North Carolina House of Representatives 94th district general election, 2006
Party	Candidate	Votes	%
Republican	Tracy Walker (incumbent)	7,550	55.62%
Democratic	Judith Barlow Porter	6,025	44.38%
Total votes		13,575	100%
Republican hold			

==== District 95 ====
Incumbent Republican Karen Ray has represented the 95th District since 2003.

North Carolina House of Representatives 95th district general election, 2006
Party	Candidate	Votes	%
Republican	Karen Ray (Incumbent)	11,269	100%
Total votes		11,269	100%
Republican hold			

==== District 96 ====
Incumbent Republican Mark Hilton has represented the 96th District and its predecessors since 2001.

North Carolina House of Representatives 96th district general election, 2006
Party	Candidate	Votes	%
Republican	Mark Hilton (incumbent)	10,575	100%
Total votes		10,575	100%
Republican hold			

==== District 97 ====
Incumbent Republican Minority Leader Joe Kiser has represented the 97th District and its predecessors since 1995.

North Carolina House of Representatives 97th district general election, 2006
Party	Candidate	Votes	%
Republican	Joe Kiser (incumbent)	12,080	100%
Total votes		12,080	100%
Republican hold			

==== District 98 ====
Incumbent Republican John Rhodes has represented the 98th District since 2003. Rhodes lost re-nomination to fellow Republican Thom Tillis. Tillis won the general election.

North Carolina House of Representatives 98th district general election, 2006
Party	Candidate	Votes	%
Republican	Thom Tillis	14,479	100%
Total votes		14,479	100%
Republican hold			

==== District 99 ====
Incumbent Democrat Drew Saunders has represented the 99th District and its predecessors since 1997.

North Carolina House of Representatives 99th district general election, 2006
Party	Candidate	Votes	%
Democratic	Drew Saunders (incumbent)	9,463	100%
Total votes		9,463	100%
Democratic hold			

=== Districts 100-120 ===
==== District 100 ====
Incumbent Democrat Speaker of the House Jim Black has represented the 100th District and its predecessors since 1991.

North Carolina House of Representatives 100th district general election, 2006
Party	Candidate	Votes	%
Democratic	Jim Black (incumbent)	5,340	50.14%
Republican	Hal Jordan	5,310	49.86%
Total votes		10,650	100%
Democratic hold			

==== District 101 ====
Incumbent Democrat Beverly Earle has represented the 101st District and its predecessors since 1995.

North Carolina House of Representatives 101st district general election, 2006
Party	Candidate	Votes	%
Democratic	Beverly Earle (incumbent)	8,535	100%
Total votes		8,535	100%
Democratic hold			

==== District 102 ====
Incumbent Democrat Becky Carney has represented the 102nd District since 2003.

North Carolina House of Representatives 102nd district general election, 2006
Party	Candidate	Votes	%
Democratic	Becky Carney (incumbent)	7,994	100%
Total votes		7,994	100%
Democratic hold			

==== District 103 ====
Incumbent Republican Jim Gulley has represented the 103rd District and its predecessors since 1997.

North Carolina House of Representatives 103rd district general election, 2006
Party	Candidate	Votes	%
Republican	Jim Gulley (incumbent)	9,267	57.90%
Democratic	Everette A. Passaly	6,738	42.10%
Total votes		16,005	100%
Republican hold			

==== District 104 ====
Incumbent Republican Ed McMahan has represented the 104th District and its predecessors since 1995. McMahon didn't seek re-election. Republican Ruth Samuelson won the open seat.

North Carolina House of Representatives 104th district general election, 2006
Party	Candidate	Votes	%
Republican	Ruth Samuelson	14,668	67.03%
Democratic	Paula McSwain	7,215	32.97%
Total votes		21,883	100%
Republican hold			

==== District 105 ====
Incumbent Republican Doug Vinson has represented the 105th District since 2005. Vinson didn't seek re-election and fellow Republican Ric Killian win the open seat.

North Carolina House of Representatives 105th district general election, 2006
Party	Candidate	Votes	%
Republican	Ric Killian	15,343	100%
Total votes		15,343	100%
Republican hold			

==== District 106 ====
Incumbent Democrat Martha Alexander has represented the 106th district and its predecessors since 1999.

North Carolina House of Representatives 106th district general election, 2006
Party	Candidate	Votes	%
Democratic	Martha Alexander (incumbent)	8,571	100%
Total votes		8,571	100%
Democratic hold			

==== District 107 ====
Incumbent Democrat Pete Cunningham has represented the 107th District and its predecessors since 1987.

North Carolina House of Representatives 107th district general election, 2006
Party	Candidate	Votes	%
Democratic	Pete Cunningham (incumbent)	7,826	100%
Total votes		7,826	100%
Democratic hold			

==== District 108 ====
Incumbent Republican John Rayfield has represented the 108th District and its predecessors since 1995. Rayfield didn't seek re-election. Republican Wil Neumann won the open seat.

North Carolina House of Representatives 108th district general election, 2006
Party	Candidate	Votes	%
Republican	Wil Neumann	8,653	59.02%
Democratic	Marvin E. (Eddie) Wyatt, Jr.	6,009	40.98%
Total votes		14,662	100%
Republican hold			

==== District 109 ====
Incumbent Republican William Current has represented the 109th District since 2005.

North Carolina House of Representatives 109th district general election, 2006
Party	Candidate	Votes	%
Republican	William Current (incumbent)	9,047	100%
Total votes		9,047	100%
Republican hold			

==== District 110 ====
Incumbent Republican Debbie Clary has represented the 110th District and its predecessors since 1995.

North Carolina House of Representatives 110th district general election, 2006
Party	Candidate	Votes	%
Republican	Debbie Clary (incumbent)	8,888	62.19%
Democratic	Jim Long	5,404	37.81%
Total votes		14,294	100%
Republican hold			

==== District 111 ====
Incumbent Republican Tim Moore has represented the 111th District since 2003.

North Carolina House of Representatives 111th district general election, 2006
Party	Candidate	Votes	%
Republican	Tim Moore (incumbent)	9,841	60.72%
Democratic	Betsy H. Fonvielle	6,367	39.28%
Total votes		16,208	100%
Republican hold			

==== District 112 ====
Incumbent Democrat Bob England has represented the 112th District since 2003.

North Carolina House of Representatives 112th district general election, 2006
Party	Candidate	Votes	%
Democratic	Bob England (incumbent)	14,169	70.62%
Republican	David L. Reno	5,894	29.38%
Total votes		20,063	100%
Democratic hold			

==== District 113 ====
Incumbent Republican Trudi Walend has represented the 113th District and its predecessors since 1999.

North Carolina House of Representatives 113th district general election, 2006
Party	Candidate	Votes	%
Republican	Trudi Walend (incumbent)	19,026	100%
Total votes		19,026	100%
Republican hold			

==== District 114 ====
Incumbent Democrat Susan Fisher has represented the 114th District since 2004.

North Carolina House of Representatives 114th district general election, 2006
Party	Candidate	Votes	%
Democratic	Susan Fisher (incumbent)	16,073	64.28%
Republican	Mike Harrison	8,933	35.72%
Total votes		25,006	100%
Democratic hold			

==== District 115 ====
Incumbent Democrat Bruce Goforth has represented the 115th District since 2003.

North Carolina House of Representatives 115th district general election, 2006
Party	Candidate	Votes	%
Democratic	Bruce Goforth (incumbent)	18,584	67.64%
Republican	Eric Gorny	8,892	32.36%
Total votes		27,476	100%
Democratic hold			

==== District 116 ====
Incumbent Republican Wilma Sherrill has represented the 116th district and its predecessors since 1995. Sherrill didn't seek re-election. Fellow Republican Charles Thomas won the open seat.

North Carolina House of Representatives 116th district general election, 2006
Party	Candidate	Votes	%
Republican	Charles Thomas	12,840	50.83%
Democratic	Doug Jones	12,420	49.17%
Total votes		25,260	100%
Republican hold			

==== District 117 ====
Incumbent Republican Carolyn Justus has represented the 117th District since October 2002.

North Carolina House of Representatives 117th district general election, 2006
Party	Candidate	Votes	%
Republican	Carolyn Justus (incumbent)	16,783	67.48%
Democratic	Gordon Hoots	8,088	32.52%
Total votes		24,871	100%
Republican hold			

==== District 118 ====
Incumbent Democrat Ray Rapp has represented the 118th District since 2003.

North Carolina House of Representatives 118th district general election, 2006
Party	Candidate	Votes	%
Democratic	Ray Rapp (incumbent)	16,712	69.18%
Republican	Chris Gowan	7,445	30.82%
Total votes		24,157	100%
Democratic hold			

==== District 119 ====
Incumbent Democrat Phil Haire has represented the 119th District and its predecessors since 1999.

North Carolina House of Representatives 119th district general election, 2006
Party	Candidate	Votes	%
Democratic	Phil Haire (incumbent)	13,158	58.61%
Republican	Margaret Carpenter	9,292	41.39%
Total votes		22,450	100%
Democratic hold			

==== District 120 ====
Incumbent Republican Roger West has represented the 120th District and its predecessors since 2000.

North Carolina House of Representatives 120th district general election, 2006
Party	Candidate	Votes	%
Republican	Roger West (incumbent)	19,066	100%
Total votes		19,066	100%
Republican hold			

== See also ==
- List of North Carolina state legislatures
