= 2024 North Carolina Attorney General election =

- November 5, 2024
- Turnout: 73.73% (▲0.18%)
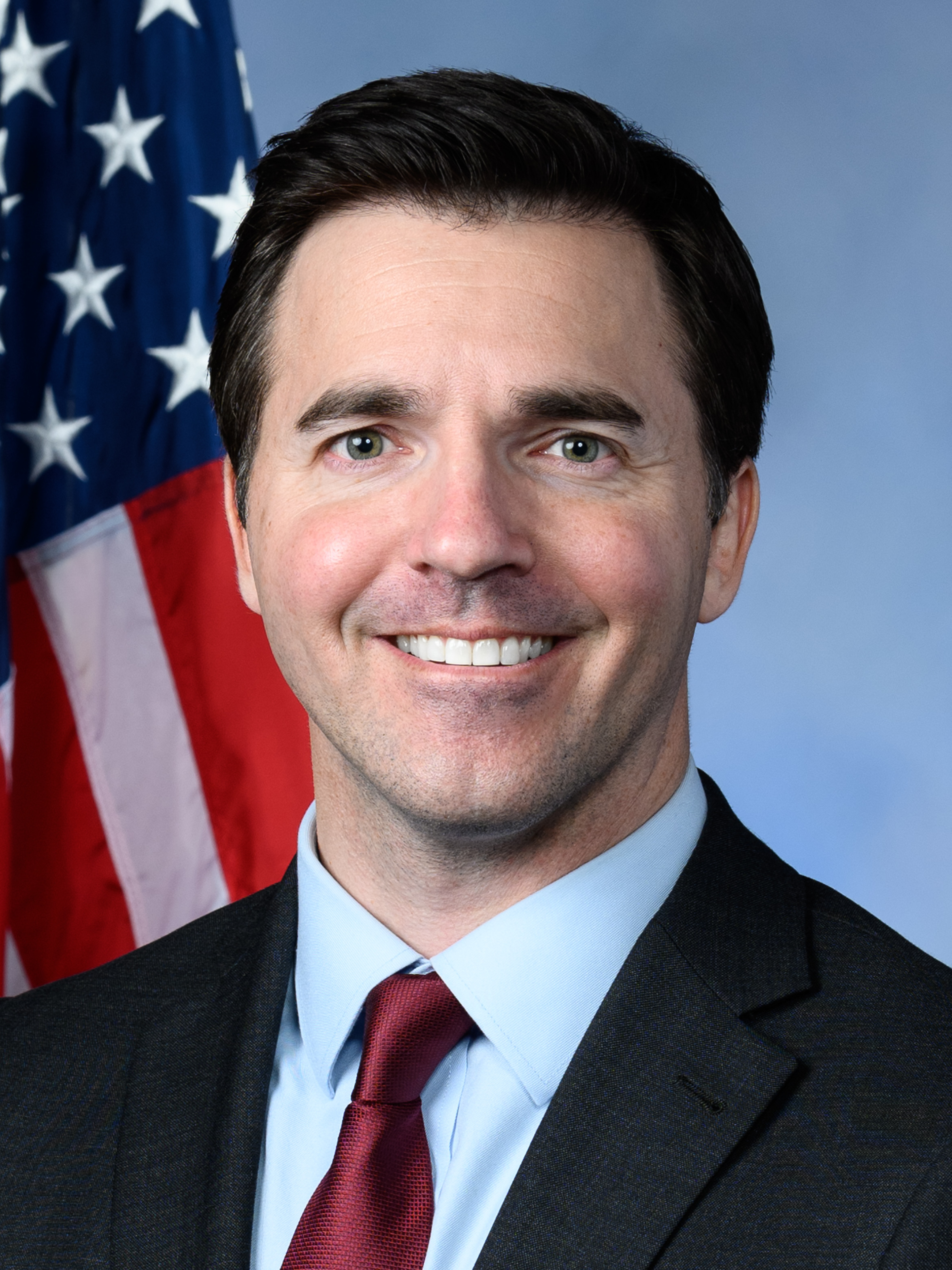

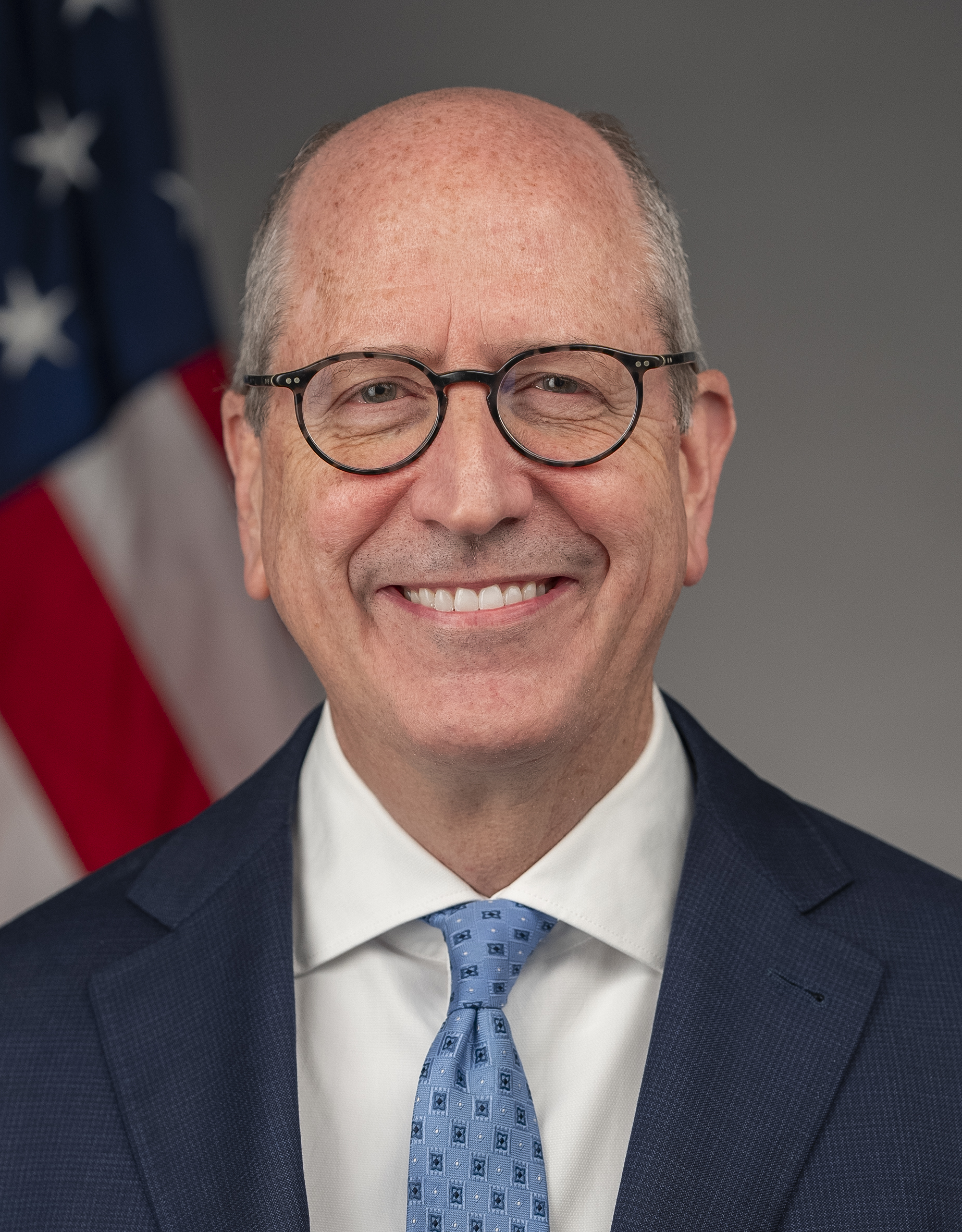
Candidate	Jeff Jackson	Dan Bishop
Party	Democratic	Republican
Popular vote	2,874,960	2,715,411
Percentage	51.43%	48.57%
- Jackson: 50–60% 60–70% 70–80% 80–90% >90% Bishop: 50–60% 60–70% 70–80% 80–90% >90% Tie: 50% No votes
Attorney General before election
Josh Stein
Democratic
Elected Attorney General
Jeff Jackson
Democratic

The 2024 North Carolina Attorney General election was held on November 5, 2024, to elect the next attorney general of North Carolina. Democratic congressman Jeff Jackson defeated Republican congressman Dan Bishop. Jackson succeeded Democratic incumbent Josh Stein, who did not seek re-election in order to successfully run for governor.

== Democratic primary ==
=== Candidates ===
==== Nominee ====
- Jeff Jackson, U.S. Representative from North Carolina's 14th congressional district

==== Eliminated in primary ====
- Satana Deberry, Durham County District Attorney
- Tim Dunn, lawyer

==== Declined ====
- Josh Stein, incumbent attorney general (ran for governor)

=== Endorsements ===
Satana Deberry

Organizations

- LGBTQ Victory Fund
Jeff Jackson

Organizations

- Vote Common Good

Labor unions

- North Carolina AFL-CIO

=== Polling ===
Poll source	Date(s) administered	Sample size (Note: Key: A – all adults RV – registered voters LV – likely voters V – unclear)	Margin of error	Satana Deberry	Tim Dunn	Jeff Jackson	Other	Undecided
High Point University	February 16–23, 2024	317 (LV)	± 6.0%	31%	3%	36%	–	–
Change Research (D) (Note: Poll sponsored by Carolina Forward)	February 15–19, 2024	1,622 (LV)	± 2.6%	14%	–	38%	4% (Note: "Would not vote" with 4%)	44%
Public Policy Polling (D)	December 15–16, 2023	556 (LV)	± 4.2%	8%	2%	34%	–	56%
Public Policy Polling (D) (Note: Poll sponsored by Jackson's campaign)	November 29–30, 2023	531 (LV)	–	12%	4%	40%	–	45%

=== Results ===
Results by county: Jackson: 30–40%; 40–50%; 50–60%; 60–70% 70–80%; Deberry: 30–40%; 40–50%; 50–60%; 60–70%

Democratic primary results
Party	Candidate	Votes	%
Democratic	Jeff Jackson	370,666	54.83%
Democratic	Satana Deberry	223,835	33.11%
Democratic	Tim Dunn	81,492	12.06%
Total votes		675,993	100.00%

== Republican primary ==
=== Candidates ===
==== Nominee ====
- Dan Bishop, U.S. Representative from North Carolina's 8th congressional district

==== Withdrew ====
- Tom Murry, former state representative from the 41st district (2011–2015) (endorsed Bishop, ran for Court of Appeals)

==== Declined ====
- Danny Britt, state senator from the 24th district
- Tim Moore, Speaker of the North Carolina House of Representatives from the 111th district (ran for U.S. House)
- Andrew Murray, former U.S. Attorney for the Western District of North Carolina (2017–2021)

=== Endorsements ===
Dan Bishop

Executive branch officials

- Donald Trump, 45th president of the United States

U.S. Representatives

- Lauren Boebert, U.S. Representative from Colorado's 3rd congressional district
- Matt Gaetz, U.S. Representative from Florida's 1st congressional district
- David McIntosh, former U.S. Representative from Indiana's 2nd congressional district (1995–2001)

State legislators

- Tom Murry, former state representative from the 41st district (2011–2015)

Organizations

- Club for Growth PAC
- Republican Attorneys General Association

=== Polling ===
Hypothetical polling

Poll source	Date(s) administered	Sample size	Margin of error	Tom Murry	Ray Starling	Undecided
SurveyUSA (Note: Poll sponsored by the John Locke Foundation)	April 25–29, 2023	707 (LV)	± 3.9%	17%	10%	73%

== General election ==
=== Predictions ===
Source	Ranking	As of
Sabato's Crystal Ball	Tossup	July 25, 2024

=== Post-primary endorsements ===
Jeff Jackson (D)

U.S. representatives

- Gabby Giffords, U.S. representative from Arizona's 8th congressional district (2007–2012)

Organizations

- Democratic Attorneys General Association
- Giffords
- Human Rights Campaign

=== Fundraising ===
Campaign finance reports as of October 19, 2024
Candidate	Raised	Spent	Cash on hand
Jeff Jackson (D)	$15,433,988	$12,872,599	$2,599,218
Dan Bishop (R)	$8,926,941	$7,384,331	$1,542,609
Source: North Carolina State Board of Elections

=== Debates ===
2024 North Carolina Attorney general debate
No.	Date	Host	Moderator	Link	Democratic	Republican
Key: P Participant A Absent N Not invited I Invited W Withdrawn						
Key: P Participant A Absent N Not invited I Invited W Withdrawn					Jackson	Bishop
1	June 21, 2024	North Carolina Bar Association	Tim Boyum	YouTube	P	P

=== Polling ===
Poll source	Date(s) administered	Sample size	Margin of error	Jeff Jackson (D)	Dan Bishop (R)	Other	Undecided
SurveyUSA (Note: Poll sponsored by WRAL-TV)	October 23–26, 2024	853 (LV)	± 4.1%	44%	42%	–	14%
ActiVote	October 8–26, 2024	400 (LV)	± 4.9%	53%	47%	–	–
Cygnal (R) (Note: Poll sponsored by Carolina Journal)	October 12–14, 2024	600 (LV)	± 4.0%	46%	43%	–	11%
ActiVote	August 20 – September 22, 2024	400 (LV)	± 4.9%	53%	47%	–	–
Fabrizio, Lee & Associates (R)/ Impact Research (D) (Note: Poll sponsored by AARP)	September 11–17, 2024	600 (LV)	± 4.0%	47%	43%	–	10%
Cygnal (R)	September 15–16, 2024	600 (LV)	± 4.0%	45%	43%	–	12%
SurveyUSA	September 4–7, 2024	676 (LV)	± 4.9%	43%	36%	–	21%
SoCal Strategies (R) (Note: Poll sponsored by On Point Politics and Red Eagle Politics, which supports Republican candidates.)	August 26–27, 2024	612 (LV)	–	36%	39%	–	24%
YouGov (D)	August 5–9, 2024	802 (RV)	± 3.9%	42%	40%	–	18%
Cygnal (R) (Note: Poll sponsored by the Carolina Journal)	August 4–5, 2024	600 (LV)	± 4.0%	38%	42%	–	20%
Change Research (D)	May 13–18, 2024	835 (LV)	± 3.8%	43%	40%	4% (Note: "Would not vote" with 4%)	14%
Meeting Street Insights (R) (Note: Poll sponsored by the Carolina Partnership for Reform & Carolina Leadership Coalition)	April 25–28, 2024	500 (RV)	± 4.4%	43%	41%	–	15%
SurveyUSA	March 3–9, 2024	598 (LV)	± 4.9%	41%	40%	–	19%
Cygnal (R)	March 6–7, 2024	600 (LV)	± 4.0%	39%	41%	–	20%
Change Research (D)	February 15–19, 2024	1,622 (LV)	± 2.6%	39%	41%	–	20%

Hypothetical polling

Generic Democrat vs. generic Republican

Poll source	Date(s) administered	Sample size	Margin of error	Generic Democrat (D)	Generic Republican (R)	Other	Undecided
High Point University	February 16–23, 2024	753 (LV)	± 3.9%	43%	44%	4% (Note: "Another party's candidate" with 4%)	9%

=== Results ===
2024 North Carolina Attorney General election
Party	Candidate	Votes	%	±%
Democratic	Jeff Jackson	2,874,960	51.43%	+1.30%
Republican	Dan Bishop	2,715,411	48.57%	–1.30%
Total votes		5,590,371	100.00%	
Democratic hold				

==== Counties that flipped from Democratic to Republican ====
- Martin (largest city: Williamston)
- Pasquotank (largest city: Elizabeth City)
- Scotland (largest city: Laurinburg)

==== By congressional district ====
District	Jackson	Bishop	Representative
1st	51%	49%	Don Davis
2nd	69%	31%	Deborah Ross
3rd	42%	58%	Greg Murphy
4th	75%	25%	Valerie Foushee
5th	45%	55%	Virginia Foxx
6th	45%	55%	Addison McDowell
7th	46%	54%	David Rouzer
8th	43%	57%	Mark Harris
9th	45%	55%	Richard Hudson
10th	44%	56%	Pat Harrigan
11th	48%	52%	Chuck Edwards
12th	76%	24%	Alma Adams
13th	45%	55%	Brad Knott
14th	46%	54%	Tim Moore

== Notes ==
Partisan clients

== See also ==
- 2024 North Carolina elections
