= 2024 North Carolina judicial elections =

One justice of the seven-member North Carolina Supreme Court and three judges of the fifteen-member North Carolina Court of Appeals were elected by North Carolina voters on November 5, 2024, concurrently with other state elections. Terms for seats on each court are eight years. These elections were conducted on a partisan basis.

The ultimate result was that Republicans won three of the four elections (all for the Court of Appeals), while a Democrat won the Supreme Court race.

Primary elections (for seats with more than one candidate from a political party) were held on March 5, 2024.

== Supreme Court Seat 6 ==
This seat was held by Associate Justice Allison Riggs, a Democrat. Governor Roy Cooper appointed her to the seat following the early retirement of Michael R. Morgan, also a Democrat. The final results of the election showed Riggs ahead of Republican challenger Jefferson Griffin by fewer than 800 votes, but legal challenges prevented their certification for months after. State courts, under a legal challenge by Griffin, had ordered the reexamination of thousands of voters' eligibilities, but a federal court later ordered the certification of the results as they stood. Griffin finally conceded the race on May 7, 2025.

2024 North Carolina Supreme Court election
- November 5, 2024

1 of 7 seat of the Supreme Court of North Carolina
	Majority party	Minority party
Party	Republican	Democratic
Last election	2 seats, 52.29%	0 seats, 47.71%
Seats before	5	2
Seats won	0	1
Seats after	5	2
Seat change	Steady	Steady
Popular vote	2,769,678	2,770,412
Percentage	49.99%	50.01%

=== Results ===
North Carolina Supreme Court election, 2024
Party	Candidate	Votes	%
Democratic	Allison Riggs (incumbent)	2,770,412	50.01%
Republican	Jefferson Griffin	2,769,678	49.99%
Total votes		5,540,090	100.00
Democratic hold			

== Court of Appeals Seat 12 (Thompson seat) ==
The incumbent was Carolyn Thompson, a Democrat. Governor Roy Cooper appointed her to fill the vacancy caused when he elevated Judge Allison Riggs (also a Democrat) to the Supreme Court. Thompson ran for a full term, but was defeated by former state representative Tom Murry.

=== Democratic primary ===
==== Candidates ====
- Carolyn Thompson, incumbent and 2022 candidate

=== Republican primary ===
==== Candidates ====
- Tom Murry, former state representative

=== General election ===
==== Debates ====
2024 North Carolina Court of Appeals Seat 12 debate
No.	Date	Host	Moderator	Link	Democratic	Republican
Key: P Participant A Absent N Not invited I Invited W Withdrawn						
Key: P Participant A Absent N Not invited I Invited W Withdrawn					Thompson	Murry
1	June 28, 2024	North Carolina Bar Association	Tim Boyum	YouTube	P	P

==== Polling ====
Poll source	Date(s) administered	Sample size (Note: Key: A – all adults RV – registered voters LV – likely voters V – unclear)	Margin of error	Carolyn Thompson	Tom Murry
ActiVote	October 8–26, 2024	400 (LV)	± 4.9%	48%	52%
ActiVote	August 20 – September 22, 2024	400 (LV)	± 4.9%	49%	51%

==== Endorsements ====
Tom Murry

Organizations

- National Federation of Independent Business North Carolina PAC

==== Results ====
Results by county Murry: 50–60%; 60–70%; 70–80%; 80–90%; Thompson: 50–60%; 60–70%; 70–80%; 80–90%

North Carolina Court of Appeals Seat 12 election, 2024
Party	Candidate	Votes	%
Republican	Tom Murry	2,809,458	50.89
Democratic	Carolyn Thompson (incumbent)	2,710,863	49.11
Total votes		5,520,321	100.00
Republican gain from Democratic			

== Court of Appeals Seat 14 (Zachary seat) ==
The incumbent was Judge Valerie Zachary, a Republican.

=== Democratic primary ===
==== Candidates ====
- Ed Eldred, attorney

=== Republican primary ===
==== Candidates ====
- Valerie Zachary, incumbent

=== General election ===
==== Polling ====
Poll source	Date(s) administered	Sample size	Margin of error	Valerie Zachary	Ed Eldred	Undecided
ActiVote	October 8–26, 2024	400 (LV)	± 4.9%	52%	48%	–
ActiVote	August 20 – September 22, 2024	400 (LV)	± 4.9%	53%	47%	–

==== Endorsements ====
Valerie Zachary

Organizations

- National Federation of Independent Business North Carolina PAC

==== Results ====
Results by county Zachary: 50–60%; 60–70%; 70–80%; 80–90%; Eldred: 50–60%; 60–70%; 70–80%

North Carolina Court of Appeals Seat 14 election, 2024
Party	Candidate	Votes	%
Republican	Valerie Zachary (incumbent)	2,879,049	52.28
Democratic	Ed Eldred	2,628,453	47.72
Total votes		5,507,502	100.00
Republican hold			

== Court of Appeals Seat 15 (Murphy seat) ==
The incumbent was Republican Hunter Murphy, who lost to Chris Freeman in the primary. Freeman then went on to win the general election, defeating Democrat Martin Moore.

=== Democratic primary ===
==== Candidates ====
- Martin E. Moore, attorney and Buncome County commissioner

=== Republican primary ===
==== Candidates ====
- Chris Freeman, District Court judge
- Hunter Murphy, incumbent

==== Results ====
Results by county Freeman: 50–60%; 60–70%; 70–80%; Murphy: 50–60%

Republican primary results
Party	Candidate	Votes	%
Republican	Chris Freeman	532,794	62.64
Republican	Hunter Murphy (incumbent)	317,807	37.36
Total votes		850,601	100.00

=== General election ===
==== Polling ====
Poll source	Date(s) administered	Sample size	Margin of error	Chris Freeman	Martin Moore	Undecided
ActiVote	October 8–26, 2024	400 (LV)	± 4.9%	53%	47%	–
ActiVote	August 20 – September 22, 2024	400 (LV)	± 4.9%	52%	48%	–

==== Endorsements ====
Chris Freeman

Organizations

- National Federation of Independent Business North Carolina PAC

==== Results ====
Results by county Freeman: 50–60%; 60–70%; 70–80%; 80–90%; Moore: 50–60%; 60–70%; 70–80%; 80–90%

North Carolina Court of Appeals Seat 15 election, 2024
Party	Candidate	Votes	%
Republican	Chris Freeman	2,844,286	51.72
Democratic	Martin E. Moore	2,654,765	48.28
Total votes		5,499,051	100.00
Republican hold			

== See also ==
- 2024 North Carolina elections
