= Chris Hegarty =

Chris Hegarty may refer to:

- Chris Hegarty (footballer, born 1984), Scottish footballer
- Chris Hegarty (footballer, born 1992), Northern Irish footballer

== See also ==
- Chris Heagarty (fl. 2000s–2020s), American politician
