= 2024 North Carolina Supreme Court election =

2024 North Carolina Supreme Court seat 6 election
- November 5, 2024
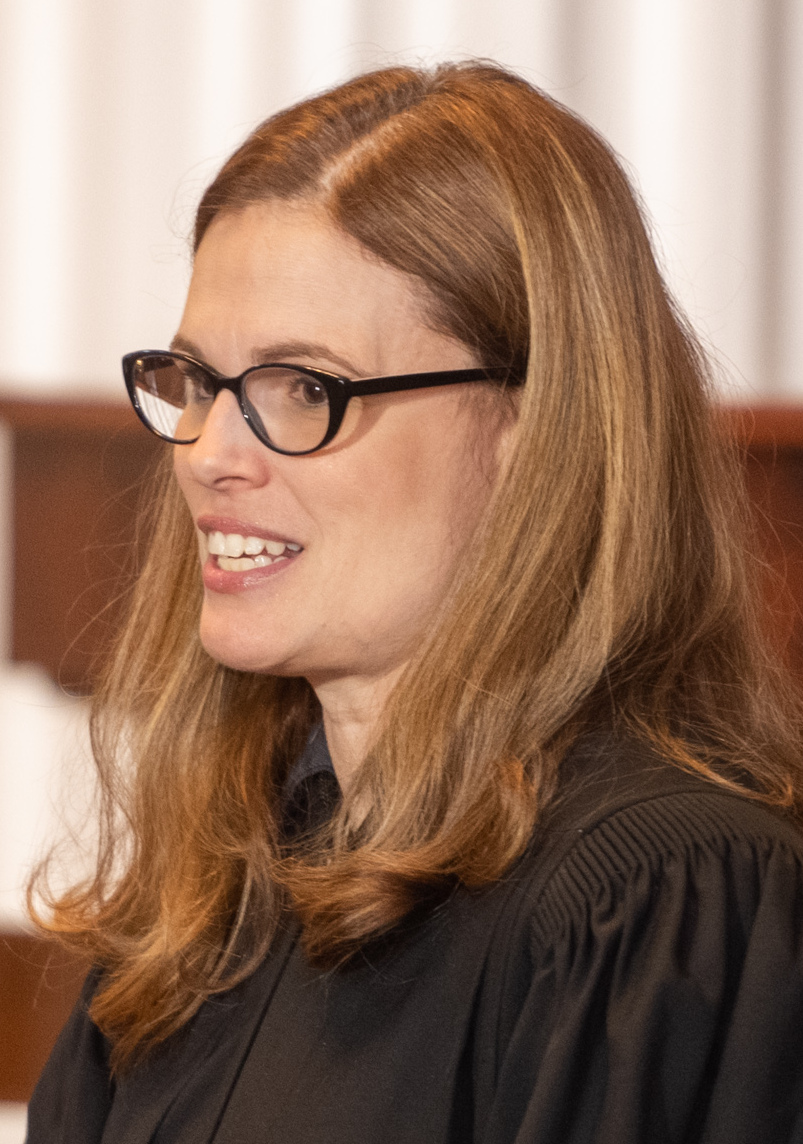

Nominee	Allison Riggs	Jefferson Griffin
Party	Democratic	Republican
Popular vote	2,770,412	2,769,678
Percentage	50.007%	49.993%
- Riggs: 50–60% 60–70% 70–80% 80–90% >90% Griffin: 50–60% 60–70% 70–80% 80–90% >90% Tie: 50%
Associate Justice before election
Allison Riggs
Democratic
Elected Associate Justice
Allison Riggs
Democratic

The 2024 North Carolina Supreme Court election was held on November 5, 2024, to elect a justice of the North Carolina Supreme Court for an eight-year term. Democratic incumbent Allison Riggs was elected to her first full term, defeating Republican state Court of Appeals judge Jefferson Griffin. Due to a legal challenge over the results from Griffin, the election was not certified until May 13, 2025, 189 days later, making it the last of the 2024 cycle to be certified.

Although the Election Day results and two recounts showed Riggs won the race by 734 votes, Griffin protested the eligibility of over 60,000 absentee ballots, prompting a lengthy legal battle in state and federal court. Griffin conceded on May 7 after a federal judge ordered the certification of the results.

== Democratic primary ==
This seat was held by Associate Justice Allison Riggs, a Democrat. Governor Roy Cooper appointed her to the seat following the early retirement of Michael R. Morgan, also a Democrat. Morgan had announced in 2023 that he would not run for reelection in 2024.

=== Candidates ===
==== Nominee ====
- Allison Riggs, incumbent Associate Justice and former North Carolina Court of Appeals judge (2023)

==== Eliminated in primary ====
- Lora Cubbage, North Carolina Superior Court judge and former District Court judge

=== Polling ===
Poll source	Date(s) administered	Sample size (Note: Key: A – all adults RV – registered voters LV – likely voters V – unclear)	Margin of error	Allison Riggs	Lora Cubbage	Undecided
Public Policy Polling (D)	December 15–16, 2023	556 (LV)	± 4.2%	12%	9%	79%

=== Results ===
Democratic primary results by county Riggs: 50–60%; 60–70%; 70–80%; 80–90%; Cubbage: 50–60%; 60–70%

Democratic primary results
Party	Candidate	Votes	%
Democratic	Allison Riggs (incumbent)	450,268	69.10%
Democratic	Lora Christine Cubbage	201,336	30.90%
Total votes		651,604	100.0%

== Republican primary ==
=== Candidates ===
- Jefferson Griffin, North Carolina Court of Appeals judge

== General election ==
=== Endorsements ===
Jefferson Griffin (R)

Organizations

- National Federation of Independent Business North Carolina PAC

=== Debate ===
2024 North Carolina Supreme Court Seat 6 debate
No.	Date	Host	Moderator	Link	Democratic	Republican
Key: P Participant A Absent N Not invited I Invited W Withdrawn						
Key: P Participant A Absent N Not invited I Invited W Withdrawn					Riggs	Griffin
1	June 28, 2024	North Carolina Bar Association	Tim Boyum	YouTube	P	P

=== Polling ===
Poll source	Date(s) administered	Sample size	Margin of error	Allison Riggs (D)	Jefferson Griffin (R)	Undecided
ActiVote	October 8–26, 2024	400 (LV)	± 4.9%	48%	52%	–
Cygnal (R) (Note: Poll sponsored by the Carolina Journal)	October 12–14, 2024	600 (LV)	± 4.0%	43%	45%	12%
ActiVote	August 20 – September 22, 2024	400 (LV)	± 4.9%	52%	48%	–
Cygnal (R)	September 15–16, 2024	600 (LV)	± 4.0%	44%	41%	15%
YouGov (D) (Note: Poll sponsored by Carolina Forward)	August 5–9, 2024	802 (RV)	± 3.9%	42%	41%	17%
Cygnal (R)	August 4–5, 2024	600 (LV)	± 4.0%	37%	40%	22%
Spry Strategies	June 7–11, 2024	600 (LV)	± 4.0%	39%	37%	24%
Change Research (D)	May 13–18, 2024	835 (LV)	± 3.8%	41%	40%	19%
Cygnal (R)	May 4–5, 2024	600 (LV)	± 4.0%	39%	40%	21%
Meeting Street Insights (R) (Note: Poll sponsored by Carolina Partnership for Reform & Carolina Leadership Coalition)	April 25–28, 2024	500 (RV)	± 4.4%	42%	40%	18%

=== Results ===
2024 North Carolina Supreme Court Seat 6 election
Party	Candidate	Votes	%
Democratic	Allison Riggs (incumbent)	2,770,412	50.007%
Republican	Jefferson Griffin	2,769,678	49.993%
Total votes		5,540,090	100.00%
Democratic hold			

==== By congressional district ====
Despite losing the state, Griffin won ten of 14 congressional districts.

District	Riggs	Griffin	Representative
1st	50.1%	49.9%	Don Davis
2nd	68%	32%	Deborah Ross
3rd	41%	59%	Greg Murphy
4th	74%	26%	Valerie Foushee
5th	43%	57%	Virginia Foxx
6th	43%	57%	Addison McDowell
7th	45%	55%	David Rouzer
8th	42%	58%	Mark Harris
9th	44%	56%	Richard Hudson
10th	43%	57%	Pat Harrigan
11th	47%	53%	Chuck Edwards
12th	74%	26%	Alma Adams
13th	44%	56%	Brad Knott
14th	44%	56%	Tim Moore

== Aftermath ==
=== State court proceedings ===
Following the initial election recount, Jefferson Griffin filed an election protest challenging the eligibility of over 60,000 absentee ballots from six heavily Democratic-voting counties (Buncombe, Cumberland, Durham, Forsyth, Guilford and New Hanover). These ballots fell into three categories:

- ~60,000 ballots from voters with incomplete registration information—alleged voters whose record lacked a driver's license number or social security number
- ~1,409 ballots from military and overseas voters without photo ID in Guilford County
- 266 ballots from overseas voters who have not previously resided in North Carolina but whose parents are North Carolina citizens (referred to as "never residents")

At the time of the election, in accordance with UOCAVA, military and overseas voters were not required to provide a photo ID when voting absentee. In addition, North Carolina law permits overseas voters who have never resided in the United States to vote in North Carolina elections, provided they have a parent or legal guardian who currently resides or last resided in the state. The Republican National Committee and the state Republican Party challenged these voters' ability to cast votes before the election, however the challenges were dismissed.

In December 2024, the North Carolina State Board of Elections dismissed Griffin's election protest. Griffin then filed a Writ of prohibition petition with the state Supreme Court to stop the certification of the election. The Supreme Court dismissed the challenge in January 2025, stating that the proper avenue to appeal State Board of Election decisions was through the Wake County Superior Court. However, the Court did grant a stay of certification, halting the election certification pending resolution of all appeals. In February, Superior Court judge William Pittman affirmed the State Board decision, denying relief to Griffin.

Griffin appealed to the North Carolina Court of Appeals which overturned the lower court ruling by a 2–1 vote on April 4. On the issue of (1) incomplete voter registration, the majority analyzed N.C. Gen. Stat. § 163-82.4, a statute that sets out voter registration requirements. In analyzing this statute with a strict interpretation, the court held that any voter who registered after this law was effective in 2004 and failed to provide proof of identification (driver's license or last 4 digits of a Social Security number) was not a lawfully registered voter. On the issue of (2) photo identification for military and overseas voters, the court used the legal principle of in pari materia, meaning dealing with the same subject. In this case, the court compared Article 20 of Chapter 163 of the North Carolina General Statutes, the procedures for absentee voting, with Article 21A of the Uniform Military and Overseas Voters Act (UMOVA), the procedures for military and overseas voters. When doing so, the court found that these statutes did not exempt these voters from the photo ID requirement. The court held that the Board of Elections’ reasoning for this exemption wasn't consistent with the General Assembly's intent in enacting Article 20 of Chapter 163 of preventing voter fraud.

For both challenges (1) and (2), the Court ordered a 15-day cure process.This would allow the voters who are subject to this challenge the opportunity to provide the adequate information to cure their votes. Lastly, on the issue of (3) never residents, the court relied on Article 6 of the North Carolina Constitution. This article requires that a person must reside within the state for at least one year to vote. The court reasoned that since these voters had never resided within the state, they were ineligible to vote. Thus, these 266 alleged votes should be removed from the vote count. The court gave no opportunity for these individuals to cure their vote.

Riggs and the State Board appealed to the state Supreme Court. For (1) incomplete voter registration, the high court unanimously overturned the Court of Appeals’ decision. The court reasoned that voters should not be penalized for clerical errors made by election officials; thus, the votes should be counted. On issue (2), photo identification for military and overseas voters, the Supreme Court by a 4-2 vote affirmed the Court of Appeals decision to cure these votes. However, the Supreme Court extended the cure process deadline to 30 days after notice was sent for those alleged votes. Lastly, the Supreme Court affirmed the lower court's decision for (3) never residents as well by a 4–2 vote. Subsequently, the Court ordered the 266 alleged never-resident votes be thrown out. Justice Anita Earls vehemently dissented, characterizing the majority's decision as "stealing the election" and a "bloodless coup". Justice Richard Dietz also dissented, proclaiming the majority should have "embrace[d] the universally accepted principle that courts cannot change election outcomes by retroactively rewriting the law." In addition, Justice Dietz criticized the majority decision as incentivizing future losing candidates to challenge their election results.

=== Federal court proceedings ===
Following the state Supreme Court decision, Riggs announced that she would be taking the case to federal court. Riggs filed a motion for a preliminary injunction seeking to halt the curing process, in the United States District Court for the Eastern District of North Carolina. Chief Judge Richard Myers declined to halt the curing process, but ordered the State Board to halt certification of the election (presumably any amended results after the conclusion of the cure process), pending resolution of the case in federal court. Riggs further appealed to the 4th Circuit, which granted a stay on April 22, effectively halting the curing process and potential discarding of the challenged ballots, while the case proceeds through the district court.

On May 5, 2025, six months to the day after the election, Chief Judge Myers ordered the Board of Elections to certify the results of the election as they stood following the December recount. Myers held that retroactively throwing out mail ballots from overseas and military voters violated their substantive due process rights, and the cure procedure sanctioned by the NC Supreme Court violated equal protection. In regard to the category of voters labeled as "never residents", Myers ruled that the decisions of the state Supreme Court and Court of Appeals to throw out their votes without any chance for these voters to challenge their classification, violated procedural due process. This was especially significant given the numerous instances of voters who were classified as "never residents", but were in fact, North Carolina residents with extensive histories of voting in the state.

Griffin conceded the election to Riggs on May 7, 2025. Riggs was officially sworn into office on Tuesday, May 13, 2025, in the state Capitol by Justice Anita Earls. Justice Riggs' investiture ceremony soon followed on June 11, 2025, with a dual ceremony at the state Capitol and the Supreme Court of North Carolina.
