= Allison Riggs =

American judge (born 1981)

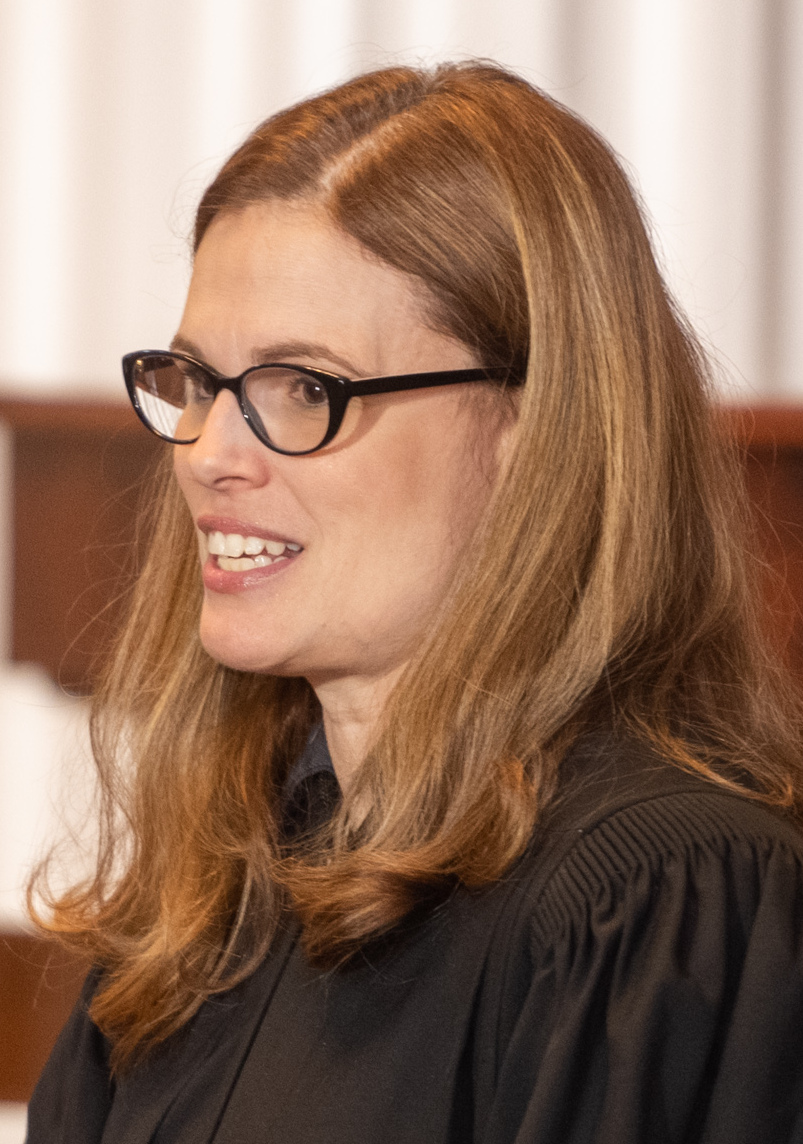
- Riggs in 2025

Associate Justice of the North Carolina Supreme Court
- Incumbent
- Assumed office September 13, 2023
- Appointed by: Roy Cooper
- Preceded by: Michael R. Morgan

Judge of the North Carolina Court of Appeals
- In office January 1, 2023 – September 13, 2023
- Appointed by: Roy Cooper
- Preceded by: Richard Dietz
- Succeeded by: Carolyn Thompson

Personal details
- Born: May 8, 1981 (age 44)
- Party: Democratic
- Education: University of Florida (BA, MA, JD)

Allison Jean Riggs (born May 8, 1981) is an American state court judge who is an associate justice of the North Carolina Supreme Court. She was appointed by Governor Roy Cooper in 2023 and retained her seat in the 2024 election.

Riggs has served as co-leader of the Southern Coalition for Social Justice in Durham, North Carolina, and has argued before the U.S. Supreme Court in a Texas redistricting case in 2018 and a North Carolina redistricting case in 2019.

== Early life and education ==
Riggs was born in New York, and raised in Morgantown, West Virginia. Her father is a US Navy veteran, who worked at West Virginia University. She is the eldest of four children, one brother, who also served in the military, and three sisters. She attended private school until middle school, and then went to the local public high school, where she was a National Merit Scholar.

Riggs earned her Bachelor of Arts in Microbiology from the University of Florida in 2003. As an undergraduate, she researched the effect of recreational drugs, such as MDMA, on brain structures. For graduate school, she continued at the University of Florida and received a Master's degree in History in 2006, and a Juris Doctor in 2009. In law school, she became involved in voting rights efforts. She served as president of the American Constitution Society and invested in the Restoration of Civil Rights Clinic. During her law school summers, she worked at the UNC School of Government and in the North Carolina Attorney General’s office.

== Career ==
In 2009, Riggs joined the Voting Rights Program at Southern Coalition for Social Justice in Durham, North Carolina. As part of her various roles, she was responsible for writing the grant that created the organization. During her tenure, she served as a staff attorney, senior attorney, chief counsel for Voting Rights, interim executive director, and co-executive director.

=== Notable cases ===
- Riggs was part of the legal team that filed a lawsuit challenging North Carolina's voter law signed by North Carolina Governor Pat McCrory in August 2013. The case was League of Women Voters of North Carolina, et al. v. North Carolina.
- In 2018, Riggs argued for the plaintiffs in Abbott v. Perez. The case involved a challenge to Texas's 2013 redistricting plan as unlawfully based on race, violating the Fourteenth Amendment's prohibition on racial gerrymandering and Section 2 of the Voting Rights Act of 1965. Split 5-4 along ideological lines, the Court upheld Texas's redistricting as lawful because the state was entitled to legislative good faith, and the plaintiffs could not meet their burden of proof.
- In 2021, Riggs was part of the legal team in Judicial Watch v. North Carolina. The suit was to compel the State of North Carolina, the North Carolina State Board of Elections, the Mecklenburg County Board of Elections, and the Guilford County Board of Elections to comply with their voter rolls maintenance and record production obligations under Section 8 of the National Voter Registration Act of 1993.

== Judicial career ==
=== North Carolina Court of Appeals ===
Governor Roy Cooper appointed Riggs to be a judge on the North Carolina Court of Appeals starting on January 1, 2023. She filled the vacancy on the Court of Appeals created by the election of Richard Dietz to the North Carolina Supreme Court.

=== North Carolina Supreme Court ===
Governor Cooper appointed Riggs to be a judge on the North Carolina Supreme Court in September 2023, filling the vacancy created by the resignation of Michael R. Morgan. She won the election for the same position in November 2024. Jefferson Griffin, her Republican opponent, lost by 734 votes. Despite two independent recounts and judicial review by the Wake County Superior Court and the State Board of Elections, which found his claims of election manipulation baseless, he refused to concede. On May 5, 2025, Chief District Judge Richard E. Myers II ordered the North Carolina Board of Elections to certify the results of the state’s Supreme Court election and that the ballots challenged by Griffin should be counted, deeming the "retroactive invalidation of absentee ballots cast by overseas military and civilian voters violates those voters’ substantive due process rights.”

On May 7, 2025, Jefferson Griffin conceded the North Carolina Supreme Court race to Allison Riggs, ending a more than six-month legal challenge and concluding the final uncertified contest of the 2024 general election cycle. The North Carolina State Board of Elections issued a certificate of election to Riggs on May 13, 2025. Later that day, during a ceremony held in the old House chamber of the North Carolina State Capitol, Riggs was administered the oath of office by Associate Justice Anita Earls and officially sworn in to begin her eight-year term on the court.

==== Electoral history ====
Associate Justice of the North Carolina Supreme Court (Seat 6) Democratic primary election, 2024
Party	Candidate	Votes	%
Democratic	Allison Riggs (incumbent)	450,268	69.10
Democratic	Lora Christine Cubbage	201,336	30.90
Total votes		651,604	100.00

North Carolina Supreme Court election, 2024
Party	Candidate	Votes	%
Democratic	Allison Riggs (incumbent)	2,770,412	50.01
Republican	Jefferson Griffin	2,769,678	49.99
Total votes		5,540,090	100.00

Legal offices
Preceded by Michael R. Morgan	Associate Justice of the North Carolina Supreme Court; 2023–present	Incumbent
