= R. Tracy Walker =

American politician (1937-2019)

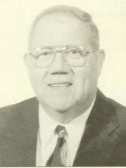
Walker in the 2001 legislative manual

Ronald Tracy Walker (July 27, 1937 – October 14, 2019) was a Republican member of the North Carolina General Assembly who represented the state's ninety-fourth House district, including constituents in Wilkes county. A retired human resources manager from Wilkesboro, North Carolina, Walker served four terms in the state House.

In 1996, Walker was the Republican nominee for North Carolina Commissioner of Labor but lost the election to incumbent Harry Payne, a Democrat.

He died on October 14, 2019, at age 82.

== Electoral history ==
=== 2006 ===
North Carolina House of Representatives 94th district Republican primary election, 2006
Party	Candidate	Votes	%
Republican	Tracy Walker (incumbent)	2,848	61.18%
Republican	Barry Brown	1,807	38.82%
Total votes		4,655	100%

North Carolina House of Representatives 94th district general election, 2006
Party	Candidate	Votes	%
Republican	Tracy Walker (incumbent)	7,550	55.62%
Democratic	Judith Barlow Porter	6,025	44.38%
Total votes		13,575	100%
Republican hold			

=== 2004 ===
North Carolina House of Representatives 94th district Republican primary election, 2004
Party	Candidate	Votes	%
Republican	Tracy Walker (incumbent)	4,126	60.61%
Republican	David Sprinkle	2,682	39.39%
Total votes		6,808	100%

North Carolina House of Representatives 94th district general election, 2004
Party	Candidate	Votes	%
Republican	Tracy Walker (incumbent)	20,714	100%
Total votes		20,714	100%
Republican hold			

=== 2002 ===
North Carolina House of Representatives 83rd district Republican primary election, 2002
Party	Candidate	Votes	%
Republican	Tracy Walker (incumbent)	3,181	51.69%
Republican	Roger Smithey	2,973	48.31%
Total votes		6,154	100%

North Carolina House of Representatives 83rd district general election, 2002
Party	Candidate	Votes	%
Republican	Tracy Walker (incumbent)	12,976	64.58%
Democratic	Robert T. Johnston	6,472	32.21%
Libertarian	Pat Kingsbury	646	3.21%
Total votes		20,094	100%
Republican hold			

=== 2000 ===
North Carolina House of Representatives 41st district Republican primary election, 2000
Party	Candidate	Votes	%
Republican	George Holmes (incumbent)	7,116	33.62%
Republican	Tracy Walker	6,578	31.08%
Republican	Benny P. West	4,756	22.47%
Republican	David Sprinkle	2,714	12.82%
Total votes		21,164	100%

North Carolina House of Representatives 41st district general election, 2000
Party	Candidate	Votes	%
Republican	Tracy Walker	34,478	51.23%
Republican	George Holmes (incumbent)	32,829	48.78%
Total votes		67,307	100%
Republican hold			
Republican hold			

Party political offices
Preceded by Nelson Dollar	Republican nominee for North Carolina Commissioner of Labor; 1996	Succeeded by Cherie Berry
North Carolina House of Representatives
Preceded by John Walter Brown	Member of the North Carolina House of Representatives from the 41st district 2001–2003; Served alongside: George Holmes	Succeeded by Margaret Dickson
Preceded by Gene McCombs	Member of the North Carolina House of Representatives from the 83rd district 2003–2005	Succeeded by Linda Johnson
Preceded by Michael Decker	Member of the North Carolina House of Representatives from the 94th district 2005–2009	Succeeded by Shirley Randleman
