= Maria Cervania =

American politician

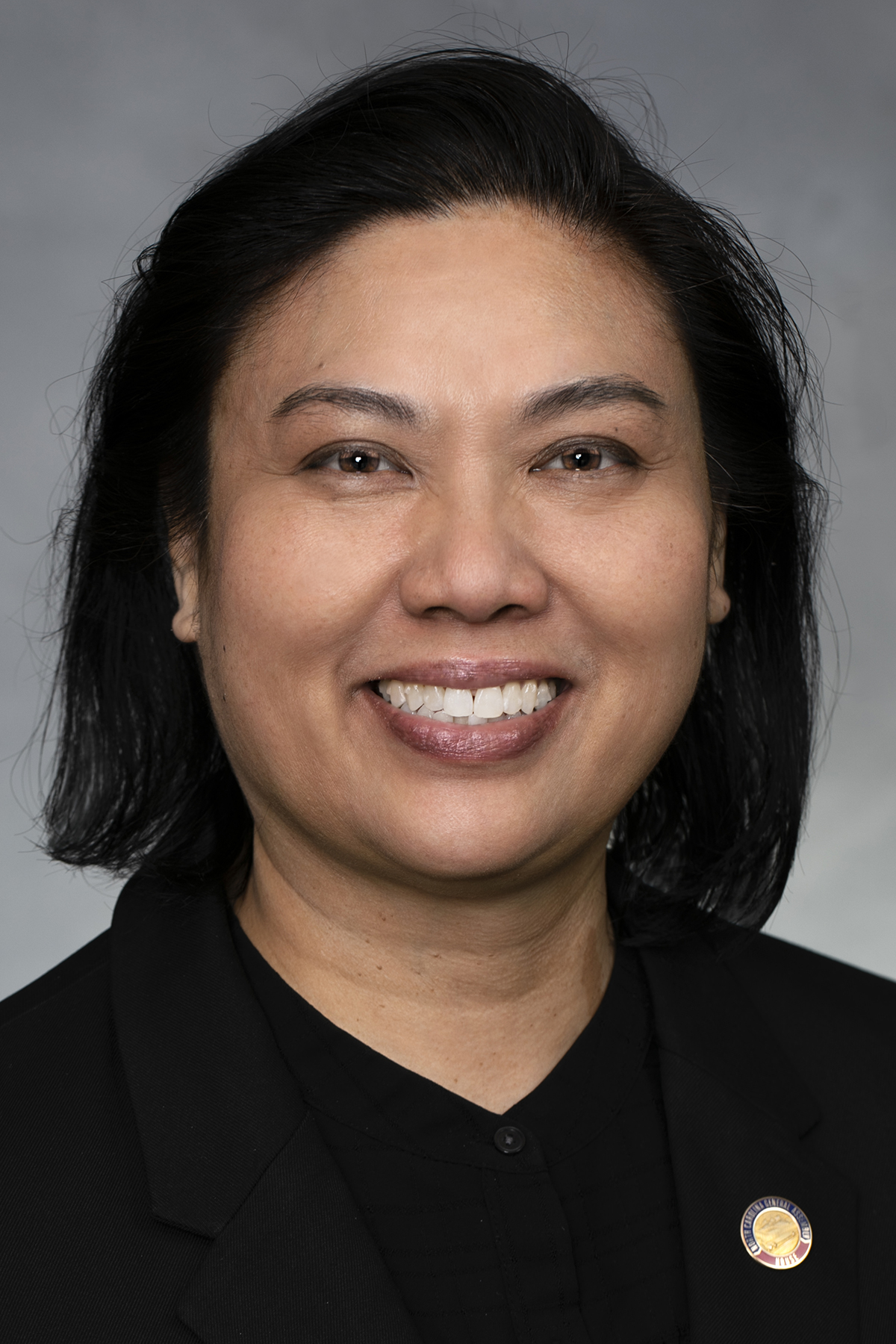

Member of the North Carolina House of Representatives from the 41st district
- Incumbent
- Assumed office January 1, 2023
- Preceded by: Gale Adcock

Member of the Wake County Board of Commissioners from the 3rd District
- In office December 2, 2020 – December 4, 2022
- Preceded by: Jessica Holmes
- Succeeded by: Cheryl Stallings

Personal details
- Born: Oakland, California, U.S.
- Party: Democratic
- Education: University of California at Berkeley (BA); University of Illinois Chicago (MPH)
- Occupation: Biostatistician
- Website: Official website

Maria Cervania is an American epidemiologist and politician serving as a Democratic member of the North Carolina House of Representatives, representing the 41st district in western Wake County since 2023. Cervania previously served on the Wake County Board of Commissioners from 2020 to 2022, making her the first person of AAPI descent to be elected to the Board. She's a member of the Progressive House Caucus.

== Committee assignments ==
=== 2023-2024 Session ===
- Appropriations
- Appropriations - Health and Human Services
- Energy and Public Utilities
- Health
- Oversight and Reform

== Electoral history ==
=== 2022 ===
North Carolina House of Representatives 41st district general election, 2022
Party	Candidate	Votes	%
Democratic	Maria Cervania	24,096	63.92%
Republican	Bruce K. Forster	12,629	33.50%
Libertarian	Kevin Terrett	970	2.57%
Total votes		37,695	100%
Democratic hold			

=== 2020 ===
Wake County Board of Commissioners 3rd district Democratic primary election, 2020
Party	Candidate	Votes	%
Democratic	Maria Cervania	96,495	59.92%
Democratic	Audra Killingsworth	64,558	40.08%
Total votes		161,053	100%

Wake County Board of Commissioners 3rd district general election, 2020
Party	Candidate	Votes	%
Democratic	Maria Cervania	364,737	60.55%
Republican	Steve Hale	237,605	39.45%
Total votes		602,342	100%
Democratic hold			

North Carolina House of Representatives
Preceded by Gale Adcock	Member of the North Carolina House of Representatives from the 41st district 2023–Present	Incumbent
