= Jefferson Griffin =

American judge

Judge of the North Carolina Court of Appeals
- Incumbent
- Assumed office January 1, 2021
- Preceded by: Christopher Brook

Personal details
- Party: Republican
- Education: University of North Carolina, Chapel Hill (BA); North Carolina Central University (JD)

Jefferson Griffin is an American judge on the North Carolina Court of Appeals.

== Early life and education ==
Griffin grew up in Red Oak, North Carolina and graduated from the University of North Carolina at Chapel Hill and the North Carolina Central University School of Law.

== Career ==
He was appointed by North Carolina Governor Pat McCrory to be a District Court Judge in Wake County in 2015. Judge Griffin was elected to a four-year term in the 2016 general election to retain his seat. He served there until his election to the North Carolina Court of Appeals in 2020.

=== North Carolina Supreme Court election ===
On January 5, 2023, he declared his intentions to run for the North Carolina Supreme Court in the 2024 elections.

In the 2024 election, Griffin lost narrowly to incumbent Democratic justice Allison Riggs, by a margin of 734 votes out of more than 5.5 million cast. Following three recounts indicating his loss, rather than concede, Griffin filed suit in state court, arguing that approximately 60,000 votes should be disqualified. Griffin argued ballots should be thrown out where the voter registration did not include their driver’s license number or the last four digits of a social security number. There are many legitimate reasons why such information is not included in a voter registration such as transcription issues. Many of the voters whose ballots Griffin sought to throw out had participated in North Carolina elections without problems for decades. The News and Observer described Griffin's campaign against these voters as "unprecedented."

The North Carolina state election board and a Wake County Superior Court rejected Griffin's claims. On April 4th, 2025, the North Carolina Court of Appeals ordered the state election board require that the 65,000 ballots challenged by Griffin be verified within 15 days or be removed from the election results.

On April 11, 2025, the North Carolina Supreme Court ruled that the approximately 60,000 voters missing registration information would not be required to validate their votes. However the NC Supreme Court granted a partial win to Griffin’s ongoing challenge of approximately 5,000 voters of overseas and military NC voters. These voters would have to undergo a “cure” process within 30 days whereby they present photo ID to the NCBOE. The affected ballots were primarily overseas and military voters. An additional couple hundred included in this challenge are so-called Never-Residents, children of NC residents who live outside the US. Only overseas voters registered in 4 counties have had their votes challenged in Griffin’s lawsuit: Durham, Guilford, Buncombe, and Forsyth, with all 4 leaning heavily Democratic. Riggs announced that she planned to appeal the case to the federal Fourth Circuit, which would on April 12, 2025, order the North Carolina State Board of Elections to begin implementing the North Carolina Supreme Court's ruling. According to the North Carolina State Board of Elections, the rulings will impact 1,675 votes. The board has said that they will require the 1,409 voters from Guilford County to provide a photo ID within 30 days. The other challenges Griffin made in other counties were not filed in time. On May 5, 2025, Chief District Judge Richard E. Myers II ordered the North Carolina Board of Elections to certify the results of the state’s Supreme Court election and that the ballots challenged by Griffin should be counted, deeming the "retroactive invalidation of absentee ballots cast by overseas military and civilian voters violates those voters’ substantive due process rights.”

Griffin conceded the election to Riggs on May 7, 2025.

== Electoral history ==
Wake County District Court Judge, 2016
Party	Candidate	Votes	%	±%
	Jefferson G. Griffin	293,797	100.00%	
Total votes		293,797	100.00%	

North Carolina Court of Appeals Seat 13 election, 2020
Party	Candidate	Votes	%
Republican	Jefferson G. Griffin	2,720,503	51.16%
Democratic	Christopher Brook (incumbent)	2,597,573	48.84%
Total votes		5,318,076	100.00%

Republican primary results for North Carolina Supreme Court election, 2024
Party	Candidate	Votes	%
Republican	Jefferson Griffin	Unopposed	
Total votes		None (cancelled)	100.00

North Carolina Supreme Court election, 2024
Party	Candidate	Votes	%
Democratic	Allison Riggs (incumbent)	2,770,412	50.01
Republican	Jefferson Griffin	2,769,678	49.99
Total votes		5,540,090	100.00
