= Tom Murry =

American politician from North Carolina

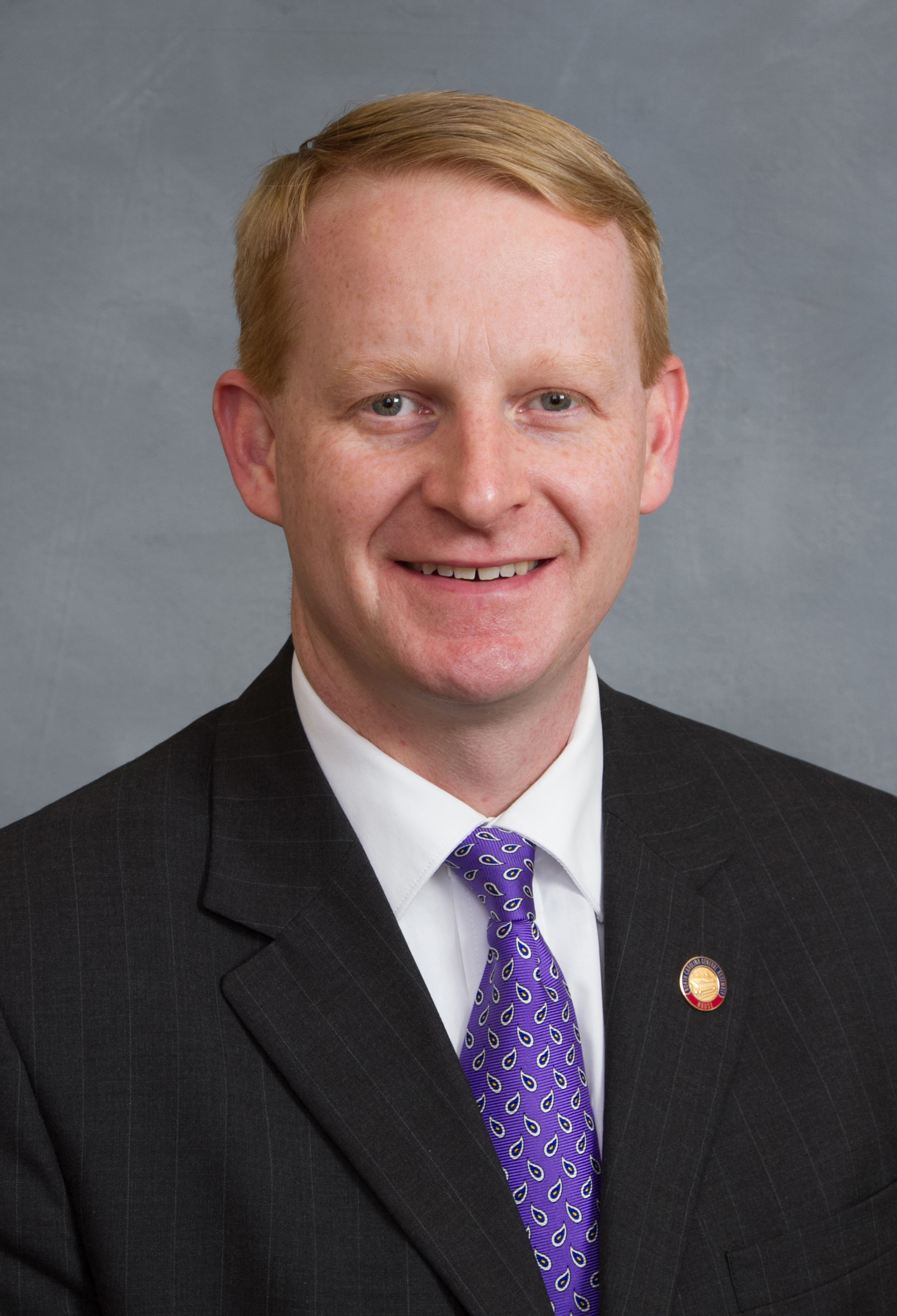

Judge of the North Carolina Court of Appeals
- Incumbent
- Assumed office January 1, 2025
- Preceded by: Carolyn Thompson

Member of the North Carolina House of Representatives from the 41st district
- In office January 1, 2011 – January 1, 2015
- Preceded by: Chris Heagarty
- Succeeded by: Gale Adcock

Member of the Morrisville Town Council from the At-Large district
- In office December 5, 2005 – January 1, 2011
- Preceded by: Jan Faulkner
- Succeeded by: Steve Rao

Personal details
- Born: Thomas Otis Murry; May 8, 1977 (age 49) Pine Bluff, Arkansas
- Party: Republican
- Spouse: Tamara
- Children: 3
- Education: University of Arkansas (PharmD); Campbell University (JD)
- Profession: Judge, Attorney, Pharmacist

Military service
- Allegiance: United States
- Branch/service: Army National Guard
- Years of service: 2014–present
- Rank: Major
- Unit: 60thTroop Command

Thomas Otis Murry (born May 8, 1977) is an American jurist, pharmacist and Army National Guard Judge Advocate General who serves as a member of the North Carolina Court of Appeals. Murry formerly served as a member of the North Carolina General Assembly representing the state's 41st House district in western Wake County between 2011 and 2015.

== Early life and education ==
Murry was born in Pine Bluff, Arkansas. He earned a Doctor of Pharmacy from the University of Arkansas and Juris Doctor from the Norman Adrian Wiggins School of Law at Campbell University.

== Career ==
=== Local Government ===
Murry served as an at-large member of the Morrisville Town Council for five years after winning elections in 2005 and 2009. Murry resigned his council seat to be sworn-in as a member of the North Carolina House of Representatives.

=== Legislative ===
In May 2010, Murry defeated Todd Batchelor in the Republican primary before facing Democrat Chris Heagarty for in the November general election. Heagarty had been appointed to the seat just months earlier by Gov. Bev Perdue to fill the remainder of the scandal-plagued term of Democratic Rep. Ty Harrell, who had recently resigned. Murry defeated Heagarty by a 54% to 46% margin.

Murry did not face a primary opponent in 2012. Murry defeated his November 2012 general election opponent, Jim Messina, by a 52-48 percent margin.

In his first term as Representative of the 41st district, Murry was the primary sponsor of numerous bills involving medical or health care issues in North Carolina, including a GOP-led measure that sought to exempt North Carolina from the federal Affordable Care Act.

Murry was the primary sponsor of voter ID legislation and a regulatory reform bill that eliminated over 1400 regulations.

The North Carolina Free Enterprise Foundation (NCFEF) called Murry the most pro-business freshman legislator in the NC State House in 2010.

Murry was ranked as the "Most Effective Freshman" in the North Carolina State House for the 2011-12 legislative session by the North Carolina Center for Public Policy Research (NCCPPR).

Murry was ranked as the 10th most effective member of the North Carolina State House for the 2013-14 legislative session by NCCPPR.

=== Judicial ===
Following the 2014 General Election, Murry became the Chief Legal Counsel to North Carolina Supreme Court Chief Justice Mark Martin in the administrative office of the NC Judicial Branch assisting the judiciary with legislative activities and strategic initiatives.

After leaving the NC Judicial Branch, Murry served as Chief of Client Services at the North Carolina Army National Guard at Joint Forces Headquarters. In this capacity, Captain Murry provided legal services to Soldiers, their families and military retirees ranging from estate planning, family law, consumer protection issues, and tax law. Murry is currently a Major at 60th Troop Command based in Raleigh, NC.

Murry served as an assistant district attorney (prosecutor) in the Eleventh Prosecutorial District, comprising Franklin, Granville, Person, Vance, and Warren Counties from 2020-2023.

In 2023, Murry announced his campaign for NC Attorney General, before switching his candidacy to oppose then-NC Appellate Court Judge Carolyn Thompson. Thompson, a Democrat who was appointed in September 2023 to the NC Court of Appeals by then-Gov. Roy Cooper, lost to Murry in the November 2024 General Election, 51% to 49%.

== Electoral history ==
=== 2024 ===
North Carolina Court of Appeals (Seat 12) election, 2024
Party	Candidate	Votes	%
Republican	Tom Murry	2,809,458	50.89%
Democratic	Carolyn Thompson (incumbent)	2,710,863	49.11%
Total votes		5,520,321	100%
Republican gain from Democratic			

=== 2014 ===
North Carolina House of Representatives 41st district general election, 2014
Party	Candidate	Votes	%
Democratic	Gale Adcock	15,160	51.32%
Republican	Tom Murry (incumbent)	14,383	48.68%
Total votes		29,543	100%
Democratic gain from Republican			

=== 2012 ===
North Carolina House of Representatives 41st district general election, 2012
Party	Candidate	Votes	%
Republican	Tom Murry (incumbent)	21,639	51.78%
Democratic	Jim Messina	20,150	48.22%
Total votes		41,789	100%
Republican hold			

=== 2010 ===
North Carolina House of Representatives 41st district Republican primary election, 2010
Party	Candidate	Votes	%
Republican	Tom Murry	2,070	49.72%
Republican	Todd A. Batchelor	1,941	46.63%
Republican	David Sloane	152	3.65%
Total votes		4,163	100%

North Carolina House of Representatives 41st district general election, 2010
Party	Candidate	Votes	%
Republican	Tom Murry	19,736	53.65%
Democratic	Chris Heagarty (incumbent)	17,052	46.35%
Total votes		36,788	100%
Republican gain from Democratic			

=== 2009 ===
Morrisville Town Council At-Large election, 2009
Party	Candidate	Votes	%
Nonpartisan	Tom Murry (incumbent)	868	76.75%
Nonpartisan	Michael Roberts	173	15.30%
Nonpartisan	Lydia Martin	84	7.43%
Write-in		6	0.53%
Total votes		1,131	100%

=== 2005 ===
Morrisville Town Council At-Large election, 2005
Party	Candidate	Votes	%
Nonpartisan	Tom Murry	247	31.59%
Nonpartisan	Ward Mercer	153	19.57%
Nonpartisan	Michael Roberts	142	18.16%
Nonpartisan	Richard Elliott	139	17.77%
Nonpartisan	Sam Gabr	49	6.27%
Nonpartisan	Paul Harris	44	5.63%
Nonpartisan	Ken Sack	6	0.77%
Write-in		2	0.26%
Total votes		782	100%

North Carolina House of Representatives
Preceded by Chris Heagarty	Member of the North Carolina House of Representatives from the 41st district 2011–2015	Succeeded by Gale Adcock
Legal offices
Preceded by Carolyn Thompson	Judge of the North Carolina Court of Appeals; 2025–Present	Incumbent
