= Carolyn Thompson (judge) =

American judge

Judge of the North Carolina Court of Appeals
- In office September 13, 2023 – December 31, 2024
- Appointed by: Roy Cooper
- Preceded by: Allison Riggs
- Succeeded by: Tom Murry

Personal details
- Party: Democratic
- Education: Hampton University (BA); North Carolina Central University (JD)

Carolyn Jennings Thompson is an American politician who served on the North Carolina Court of Appeals from September 11, 2023 until her defeat in the 2024 General Election to state prosecutor and former State Rep. Tom Murry. Governor Roy Cooper appointed Thompson to the Court in 2023 to fill a vacancy.

She previously served as a Deputy Commissioner on the North Carolina Industrial Commission, a state District Court Judge and a North Carolina Superior Court Judge in District 9.

In 2026, she was appointed County Attorney for Guilford County.

Thompson received her Bachelor’s Degree from Hampton University and her Juris Doctor from North Carolina Central University School of Law.

== Electoral history ==
=== 2024 ===
North Carolina Court of Appeals (Seat 12) election, 2024
Party	Candidate	Votes	%
Republican	Tom Murry	2,809,458	50.89%
Democratic	Carolyn Thompson (incumbent)	2,710,863	49.11%
Total votes		5,520,321	100%
Republican gain from Democratic			

=== 2022 ===
North Carolina Court of Appeals (Seat 8) election, 2022
Party	Candidate	Votes	%
Republican	Julee Tate Flood	1,956,550	52.42%
Democratic	Carolyn Thompson	1,775,943	47.58%
Total votes		3,732,493	100%
Republican gain from Democratic			

Legal offices
Preceded by Allison Riggs	Judge of the North Carolina Court of Appeals; 2023–2024	Succeeded by Tom Murry
