= Ty Harrell =

American politician

Member of the North Carolina House of Representatives from the 41st district
- In office January 1, 2007 – September 20, 2009
- Preceded by: Russell Capps
- Succeeded by: Chris Heagarty

Personal details
- Born: February 6, 1970 (age 56) Newark, New Jersey, U.S.
- Party: Democratic
- Education: Appalachian State University; The George Washington University
- Profession: Fundraiser, consultant

Warren Tyrone "Ty" Harrell (born February 6, 1970, in Newark, New Jersey) is a former Democratic member of the North Carolina General Assembly representing the state's 41st House district in western Wake County. He defeated Chris Mintz in the 2006 Democratic primary, and incumbent Russell Capps in the 2006 general election.

On September 20, 2009, just nine months into his second term in office, Harrell resigned from the North Carolina House of Representatives after separate investigations into his campaign expenditures were launched by the House Ethics Committee and the State Board of Elections; however, after supplying the missing details and receipts going back to 2005, the Board of Elections concurred, notifying him that his case was closed "with no outstanding issues."

== Personal life ==
Harrell was raised in Raleigh, North Carolina and graduated from Sanderson High School. Harrell received his B.A in English from Appalachian State University and his M.A in Political Management from The George Washington University. He is also a member of the Kappa Alpha Psi fraternity.

== Controversies & investigations ==
In early September 2009, the North Carolina State Board of Elections began an official audit of Harrell's campaign finance records, citing irregularities, unusual activity and incomplete entries. Among the items that reportedly caught the attention of auditors were hundreds of dollars in campaign expenditures at clothing and luggage stores marked as "committee meetings" on the paperwork Harrell filed.

Shortly after the Board of Elections' announcement, the NC House Speaker's Office announced that the Speaker had ordered an ethics investigation of Harrell over his financial records.

On September 20, 2009, Harrell submitted a letter of resignation to House Speaker Joe Hackney, effective immediately, amid the ongoing controversy over campaign expenditures totaling more than $13,000, revelations he was living outside of his district, and his divorce from his wife.

== Legislative activities ==
In his first term as Representative of the 41st district, Harrell supported measures for higher teacher and state employee salaries, accessible and quality healthcare, protection of local small businesses and collaborative university efforts in the search for renewable energy sources.

Harrell began his second term as Chair of the House Committee on Science and Technology and vice-chair of the House Committee on State Government and State Personnel, as well as vice-chair of the House Appropriations Subcommittee on Transportation.

Early in his second term, Harrell received criticism for his support of H. 1252 ("Level Playing Field") in his committee. The bill was heavily supported by various conservative organizations as well as Time Warner Cable, which had a location within then-Representative Harrell's district.

The left-leaning North Carolina Center for Public Policy Research listed Harrell 52nd in their 2008 effectiveness rankings, the highest ranking given to any freshman lawmaker. Those rankings have since been criticized for favoring the majority party, as they include votes from the media, lobbyists, and the lawmakers themselves.

In the group's subsequent 2010 rankings, the Raleigh News & Observer reported that "the dubious honor for the biggest drop in effectiveness belongs to former Rep. Ty Harrell, who dropped from 52nd to 110th."

== Political activities ==
In June 2007, Harrell became the first elected official in North Carolina to endorse Barack Obama, and after the president's election, Harrell was briefly rumored to have been considered a potential choice as Obama's ambassador to Canada.

== Electoral history ==
=== 2008 ===
North Carolina House of Representatives 41st district general election, 2008
Party	Candidate	Votes	%
Democratic	Ty Harrell (incumbent)	30,929	53.77%
Republican	Bryan Gossage	26,595	46.23%
Total votes		57,524	100%
Democratic hold			

=== 2006 ===
North Carolina House of Representatives 41st district Democratic primary election, 2006
Party	Candidate	Votes	%
Democratic	Ty Harrell	1,556	75.75%
Democratic	Chris Mintz	498	24.25%
Total votes		2,054	100%

North Carolina House of Representatives 41st district general election, 2006
Party	Candidate	Votes	%
Democratic	Ty Harrell	13,051	51.64%
Republican	Russell Capps (incumbent)	12,224	48.36%
Total votes		25,275	100%
Democratic gain from Republican			

North Carolina House of Representatives
Preceded by Russell Capps	Member of the North Carolina House of Representatives from the 41st district 2007-2009	Succeeded by Chris Heagarty
