= 2024 North Carolina elections =

- November 5, 2024

A general election was held in the U.S. state of North Carolina on November 5, 2024.

The November general election had mixed results, with neither major party winning every statewide race on the ballot. Republicans retained majorities in both state legislative chambers and picked up three of the seven Democratic-held seats in the U.S. House of Representatives and the office of State Auditor. In contrast, Democrats held the offices of Attorney General, Governor, and Secretary of State, while also flipping the offices of Lieutenant Governor and Superintendent of Public Instruction.

== Local ==
- 2024 Raleigh mayoral election

== See also ==
- Electoral reform in North Carolina
- North Carolina State Board of Elections
- Political party strength in North Carolina
- Politics of North Carolina
- Elections in North Carolina
