= Chris Heagarty =

American politician

Member of the Wake County School Board from the 7th district
- Incumbent
- Assumed office December 11, 2018
- Preceded by: Kathy Hartenstine

Member of the North Carolina House of Representatives from the 41st district
- In office October 30, 2009 – January 1, 2011
- Preceded by: Ty Harrell
- Succeeded by: Tom Murry

Personal details
- Party: Democratic
- Education: William G. Enloe High School
- Alma mater: North Carolina State University (BA)

John Christopher Heagarty is an American politician. He was appointed by Governor Bev Perdue to serve in the North Carolina House of Representatives in 2009 to fill the vacancy created by the resignation of Rep. Ty Harrell, a fellow Democrat. Heagarty represented the 41st House district in western Wake County.

A long-time resident of Wake County, Heagarty attended York Elementary School and William G. Enloe High School. He graduated from North Carolina State University with a Bachelor of Arts in multi-disciplinary studies with a concentration in political communications.

Heagarty lobbied at the North Carolina General Assembly for the NC Association of Electric Cooperatives Inc. He next served as executive director and lobbyist for the non-partisan North Carolina Center for Voter Education from 2000 until he left in 2007 to pursue a J.D. degree from North Carolina Central University.

Morrisville Councilman Tom Murry defeated Heagarty in the 2010 general election by a 54-46% margin. After his loss, Heagarty went on to head the North Carolina Judicial Standards Commission and the City of Oaks Foundation, a land conservancy.

Upon the death and posthumous re-election of Wake County School Board member Kathy Hartenstine, Heagarty applied to be appointed to the position. As he was the only contender for the District 7 seat, he was chosen to serve on the school board. He was elected to full terms on the board in 2020 and 2022.

== Electoral history ==
=== 2022 ===
Wake County School Board 7th district general election, 2022
Party	Candidate	Votes	%
Nonpartisan	Chris Heagarty (incumbent)	22,746	52.44%
Nonpartisan	Jacob Arthur	11,227	25.88%
Nonpartisan	Katie Thuy Long	9,183	21.17%
Write-in		217	0.50%
Total votes		43,373	100%

=== 2020 ===
Wake County School Board 7th district general election, 2020
Party	Candidate	Votes	%
Nonpartisan	Chris Heagarty (incumbent)	30,462	51.14%
Nonpartisan	Rachel Mills	28,596	48.01%
Write-in		506	0.85%
Total votes		59,564	100%

=== 2010 ===
North Carolina House of Representatives 41st district general election, 2010
Party	Candidate	Votes	%
Republican	Tom Murry	19,736	53.65%
Democratic	Chris Heagarty (incumbent)	17,052	46.35%
Total votes		36,788	100%
Republican gain from Democratic			

North Carolina House of Representatives
Preceded by Ty Harrell	Member of the North Carolina House of Representatives from the 41st district 2009–2011	Succeeded by Tom Murry
