= J. Russell Capps =

American politician (1931–2020)

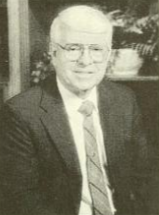
- Capps in the 2001 legislative manual

Member of the North Carolina House of Representatives
- In office January 1, 1995 – January 1, 2007
- Preceded by: Erin J. Kuczmarski
- Succeeded by: Ty Harrell
- Constituency: 92nd District (1995-2003); 50th District (2003-2005); 41st District (2005-2007)

Personal details
- Born: James Russell Capps; February 26, 1931 Raleigh, North Carolina, U.S.
- Died: October 6, 2020 (age 89) Raleigh, North Carolina, U.S.
- Party: Republican
- Education: Wake Forest University
- Profession: announcer, public servant

James Russell Capps (February 26, 1931 – October 6, 2020) was a Republican member of the North Carolina General Assembly from 1994 to 2006. Capps represented the state's 50th House District until the General Assembly redrew legislative districts. Capps then represented the 41st House District, which includes portions of the Town of Apex, Town of Cary, City of Raleigh, and the entire Town of Morrisville. The portion of Research Triangle Park (RTP) within Wake county as well as Raleigh-Durham International Airport (RDU) are also in the district.

Capps was born in Raleigh, North Carolina. He graduated from Hugh Morson High School in Raleigh. Capps went to the Radio/Television Institute of Chicago. He graduated from Wake Forest University in 1956 with a bachelor's degree in sociology. Capps was involved in the radio and television business in Raleigh. Capps went to the Southeastern Baptist Theological Seminary and served as a volunteer pastor at a Baptist church in Raleigh.

In the 2006 general election, Capps was defeated by Democratic challenger Ty Harrell.

Capps attempted a comeback to the NC State House in 2012, but was defeated by Jim Fulghum in the May primary election.

North Carolina House of Representatives
Preceded by Erin J. Kuczmarski	Member of the North Carolina House of Representatives from the 92nd district 1995–2003	Succeeded by George Holmes
Preceded by Larry Justus	Member of the North Carolina House of Representatives from the 50th district 2003–2005	Succeeded by Bill Faison
Preceded by Margaret Dickson	Member of the North Carolina House of Representatives from the 41st district 2005–2007	Succeeded by Ty Harrell
