= George M. Holmes =

American politician from North Carolina (1929–2009)

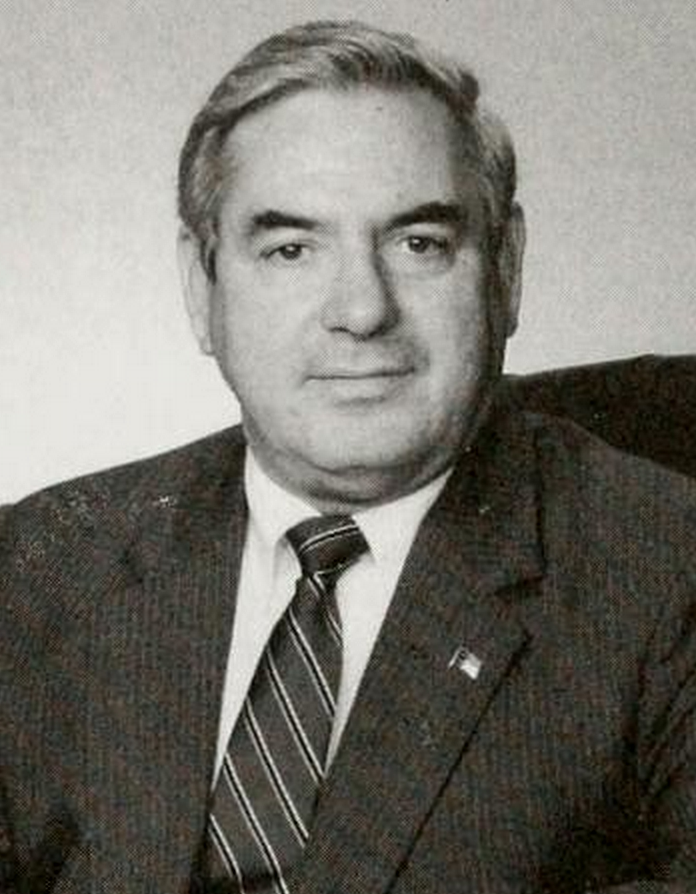

Member of the North Carolina House of Representatives
- In office January 10, 1979 – January 28, 2009
- Preceded by: James Harrell Edwards; Albert Jennings Martin
- Succeeded by: Darrell McCormick
- Constituency: 34th District (1979-1983); 41st District (1983-2003); 92nd District(2003-2009)
- In office January 15, 1975 – January 12, 1977
- Preceded by: William Edward Stevens, Jr. John Walter Brown; Jester L. Haynes
- Succeeded by: Eugene Morrison White; Albert Jennings Martin
- Constituency: 34th District

Personal details
- Born: June 20, 1929 Mount Airy, North Carolina, U.S.
- Died: December 31, 2009 (aged 80) Winston-Salem, North Carolina, U.S.
- Party: Republican
- Spouse: Barbara Ann Ireland
- Children: one daughter
- Education: Appalachian State University
- Occupation: real estate broker

George Milton Holmes (June 20, 1929 – December 31, 2009) was a Republican member of the North Carolina General Assembly representing the state's 92nd House district, including constituents in eastern Surry, northern Iredell and Yadkin counties. A retiree from Hamptonville, North Carolina, Holmes began serving his sixteenth term in January 2007. He was one of the longest serving North Carolina legislators. He died on December 31, 2009, in Winston-Salem, North Carolina.

== Early life ==
Holmes, a native of Mount Airy, North Carolina, was a 1954 graduate of Appalachian State University. At Appalachian, he received a football scholarship. Holmes married Barbara Ireland, the daughter of William Nelson Ireland, who was also a state legislator in the 1950s.

He taught at West Yadkin High School from 1954 to 1956, coaching football, baseball and basketball. In 1956, he joined W. N. Ireland Insurance Company in Yadkinville, North Carolina. He later became president and co-owner.

== Political life ==
Holmes was first elected to state office in 1974 and was defeated only once, in the post-Watergate backlash against Republicans in 1976. He was the minority whip from 1981 to 1982 and minority party joint caucus leader from 1983 to 1984. When Republicans took over the state House in 1995, Holmes gained considerable power as the co-chairman of the House Appropriations Committee from 1995 to 1998.

In 2003, Holmes, the senior Republican, was a candidate for speaker of the state House. Holmes was a compromise candidate after five Republicans refused to support Rep. Leo Daughtry. Republican Rep. Richard T. Morgan ended Holmes' bid when he and his allies orchestrated a power-sharing deal with Democrat Jim Black.

The George M. Holmes Convocation Center, an 8,325 seat arena in Boone, North Carolina, is named for Holmes, who was instrumental in bringing in state funds for the project.

Holmes was popular in his district, which is overwhelmingly Republican. He ran unopposed in the 2006 and 2004 elections, and had a Libertarian challenger in 2002.

=== Campaign finance questions ===
In December 2006, Holmes was criticized after it was reported he wrote three checks to himself totaling more than $79,000 from his campaign finance account. The last payment from the account was four days before a new law limiting personal use of campaign money took effect.

Holmes defended the transfer, saying what he did was within the law.

"Through 32 years of serving in the General Assembly, I accumulated more than I had to spend for my campaign," Holmes told the Winston-Salem Journal. "I see nothing wrong with a person who has accumulated excess funds through the years using that money because it was given with no strings attached."

=== Recent news ===
In the 2007-08 session of the legislature, Holmes was a member of these committees: Appropriations, Aging, Election Law and Campaign Finance Reform, Financial Institutions, Judiciary, Public Utilities, and University Board of Governors Nominating. He also is vice-chairman of the Appropriations Subcommittee on Transportation.

Holmes was hospitalized in March 2007 for pneumonia and to receive some treatment for his heart. He was back at his desk by March 26, 2007.

In 2008, Holmes cited his health when he declined to run for a 17th term.

== Awards ==
- Appalachian State University Distinguished Alumni Award, 1995
- N.C. Senior Tarheel Legislative Award for Exemplary Leadership, 1996
- Order of the Long Leaf Pine, 1992
- Yadkin County Chamber of Commerce Public Service Award, 1993
- The Veterans of Foreign Wars Exemplary Service award, 1995

North Carolina House of Representatives
Preceded by William Edward Stevens Jr. John Walter Brown; Jeter L. Haynes	Member of the North Carolina House of Representatives from the 34th district 1975–1977	Succeeded by Eugene Morrison White; Albert Jennings Martin
Preceded by James Harrell Edwards; Albert Jennings Martin	Member of the North Carolina House of Representatives from the 34th district 1979–1983	Succeeded by Dwight Wilson Quinn; Betty Marie Dorton Thomas; Robert L. Slaughter
Preceded by Bob Hunter	Member of the North Carolina House of Representatives from the 41st district 1983–2003	Succeeded by Margaret Dickson
Preceded by Russell Capps	Member of the North Carolina House of Representatives from the 92nd district 2003–2009	Succeeded by Darrell McCormick
