= North Carolina's 41st House district =

American legislative district

North Carolina's 41st State House of Representatives district
Representative
Maria Cervania; D–Cary
- Demographics: 46% White; 11% Black; 6% Hispanic; 31% Asian; 1% Other; 5% Multiracial
- Population (2024): 94,260

North Carolina's 41st House district is one of 120 districts in the North Carolina House of Representatives. It has been represented by Democrat Maria Cervania since 2023.

== Geography ==
Since 2005, the district has included part of Wake County. The district overlaps with the 16th and 17th Senate districts.

== District officeholders ==
=== Multi-member district ===
Representative	Party	Dates	Notes	Representative	Party	Dates	Notes	Representative	Party	Dates	Notes	Representative	Party	Dates	Notes	Counties
District created January 1, 1967.
Clarence Leatherman (Lincolnton)	Democratic	January 1, 1967 – January 1, 1973	Redistricted from the Lincoln County district.	Carl Stewart Jr. (Gastonia)	Democratic	January 1, 1967 – January 1, 1973	Redistricted to the 38th district.	David Bumgardner Jr. (Belmont)	Democratic	January 1, 1967 – January 1, 1973	Redistricted to the 38th district.	H. Max Craig Jr. (Stanley)	Republican	January 1, 1967 – January 1, 1969		1967–1973; All of Lincoln and Gaston counties.
Clarence Leatherman (Lincolnton)	Democratic	January 1, 1967 – January 1, 1973	Redistricted from the Lincoln County district.	Carl Stewart Jr. (Gastonia)	Democratic	January 1, 1967 – January 1, 1973	Redistricted to the 38th district.	David Bumgardner Jr. (Belmont)	Democratic	January 1, 1967 – January 1, 1973	Redistricted to the 38th district.	Jack Rhyne (Belmont)	Democratic	January 1, 1969 – January 1, 1973	Redistricted to the 38th district and retired to run for State Senate.	1967–1973; All of Lincoln and Gaston counties.

=== Single-member district ===
Representative	Party	Dates	Notes	Counties
Glenn Morris (Marion)	Democratic	January 1, 1973 – January 1, 1981		1973–1983; All of Yancey and McDowell counties.
Bob Hunter (Marion)	Democratic	January 1, 1981 – January 1, 1983	Redistricted to the 49th district.	1973–1983; All of Yancey and McDowell counties.

=== Multi-member district ===
Representative	Party	Dates	Notes	Representative	Party	Dates	Notes	Counties
John Walter Brown (Elkin)	Republican	January 1, 1983 – January 1, 2001	Redistricted from the 34th district. Retired.	George Holmes (Hamptonville)	Republican	January 1, 1983 – January 1, 2003	Redistricted from the 34th district. Redistricted to the 92nd district.	1983–2003; All of Yadkin and Wilkes counties. Part of Alexander County.
Tracy Walker (Wilkesboro)	Republican	January 1, 2001 – January 1, 2003	Redistricted to the 83rd district.	George Holmes (Hamptonville)	Republican	January 1, 1983 – January 1, 2003	Redistricted from the 34th district. Redistricted to the 92nd district.	1983–2003; All of Yadkin and Wilkes counties. Part of Alexander County.

=== Single-member district ===
Representative	Party	Dates	Notes	Counties
Margaret Dickson (Fayetteville)	Democratic	January 1, 2003 – January 1, 2005	Redistricted to the 44th district.	2003–2005; Parts of Cumberland and Harnett counties.
Russell Capps (Raleigh)	Republican	January 1, 2005 – January 1, 2007	Redistricted from the 50th district. Lost re-election.	2005–Present; Part of Wake County.
Ty Harrell (Raleigh)	Democratic	January 1, 2007 – September 20, 2009	Resigned.	2005–Present; Part of Wake County.
Vacant		September 20, 2009 – October 30, 2009		2005–Present; Part of Wake County.
Chris Heagarty (Raleigh)	Democratic	October 30, 2009 – January 1, 2011	Appointed to finish Harrell's term. Lost re-election.	2005–Present; Part of Wake County.
Tom Murry (Morrisville)	Republican	January 1, 2011 – January 1, 2015	Lost re-election.	2005–Present; Part of Wake County.
Gale Adcock (Cary)	Democratic	January 1, 2015 – January 1, 2023	Retired to run for State Senate.	2005–Present; Part of Wake County.
Maria Cervania (Cary)	Democratic	January 1, 2023 – Present		2005–Present; Part of Wake County.

== Election results ==
=== 2024 ===
North Carolina House of Representatives 41st district general election, 2024
Party	Candidate	Votes	%
Democratic	Maria Cervania (incumbent)	31,576	76.58%
Libertarian	Matthew Laszacs	9,659	23.42%
Total votes		41,235	100%
Democratic hold			

=== 2022 ===
North Carolina House of Representatives 41st district general election, 2022
Party	Candidate	Votes	%
Democratic	Maria Cervania	24,096	63.92%
Republican	Bruce K. Forster	12,629	33.50%
Libertarian	Kevin Terrett	970	2.57%
Total votes		37,695	100%
Democratic hold			

=== 2020 ===
North Carolina House of Representatives 41st district general election, 2020
Party	Candidate	Votes	%
Democratic	Gale Adcock (incumbent)	40,934	61.99%
Republican	Scott Populorum	23,040	34.89%
Libertarian	Guy Meilleur	2,057	3.12%
Total votes		66,031	100%
Democratic hold			

=== 2018 ===
North Carolina House of Representatives 41st district general election, 2018
Party	Candidate	Votes	%
Democratic	Gale Adcock (incumbent)	26,631	66.76%
Republican	Emmanuel Wilder	13,262	33.24%
Total votes		39,893	100%
Democratic hold			

=== 2016 ===
North Carolina House of Representatives 41st district general election, 2016
Party	Candidate	Votes	%
Democratic	Gale Adcock (incumbent)	27,491	56.99%
Republican	Chris M. Shoffner	20,745	43.01%
Total votes		48,236	100%
Democratic hold			

=== 2014 ===
North Carolina House of Representatives 41st district general election, 2014
Party	Candidate	Votes	%
Democratic	Gale Adcock	15,160	51.32%
Republican	Tom Murry (incumbent)	14,383	48.68%
Total votes		29,543	100%
Democratic gain from Republican			

=== 2012 ===
North Carolina House of Representatives 41st district general election, 2012
Party	Candidate	Votes	%
Republican	Tom Murry (incumbent)	21,639	51.78%
Democratic	Jim Messina	20,150	48.22%
Total votes		41,789	100%
Republican hold			

=== 2010 ===
North Carolina House of Representatives 41st district Republican primary election, 2010
Party	Candidate	Votes	%
Republican	Tom Murry	2,070	49.72%
Republican	Todd A. Batchelor	1,941	46.63%
Republican	David Sloane	152	3.65%
Total votes		4,163	100%

North Carolina House of Representatives 41st district general election, 2010
Party	Candidate	Votes	%
Republican	Tom Murry	19,736	53.65%
Democratic	Chris Heagarty (incumbent)	17,052	46.35%
Total votes		36,788	100%
Republican gain from Democratic			

=== 2008 ===
North Carolina House of Representatives 41st district general election, 2008
Party	Candidate	Votes	%
Democratic	Ty Harrell (incumbent)	30,929	53.77%
Republican	Bryan Gossage	26,595	46.23%
Total votes		57,524	100%
Democratic hold			

=== 2006 ===
North Carolina House of Representatives 41st district Democratic primary election, 2006
Party	Candidate	Votes	%
Democratic	Ty Harrell	1,556	75.75%
Democratic	Chris Mintz	498	24.25%
Total votes		2,054	100%

North Carolina House of Representatives 41st district general election, 2006
Party	Candidate	Votes	%
Democratic	Ty Harrell	13,051	51.64%
Republican	Russell Capps (incumbent)	12,224	48.36%
Total votes		25,275	100%
Democratic gain from Republican			

=== 2004 ===
North Carolina House of Representatives 41st district Republican primary election, 2004
Party	Candidate	Votes	%
Republican	Russell Capps (incumbent)	2,641	57.88%
Republican	Thayne N. Conrad	1,922	42.12%
Total votes		4,563	100%

North Carolina House of Representatives 41st district general election, 2004
Party	Candidate	Votes	%
Republican	Russell Capps (incumbent)	27,743	100%
Total votes		27,743	100%
Republican hold			

=== 2002 ===
North Carolina House of Representatives 41st district general election, 2002
Party	Candidate	Votes	%
Democratic	Margaret Dickson	8,596	50.68%
Republican	Mia Morris (incumbent)	8,365	49.32%
Total votes		16,961	100%
Democratic gain from Republican			

=== 2000 ===
North Carolina House of Representatives 41st district Republican primary election, 2000
Party	Candidate	Votes	%
Republican	George Holmes (incumbent)	7,116	33.62%
Republican	Tracy Walker	6,578	31.08%
Republican	Benny P. West	4,756	22.47%
Republican	David Sprinkle	2,714	12.82%
Total votes		21,164	100%

North Carolina House of Representatives 41st district general election, 2000
Party	Candidate	Votes	%
Republican	Tracy Walker	34,478	51.23%
Republican	George Holmes (incumbent)	32,829	48.78%
Total votes		67,307	100%
Republican hold			
Republican hold			
