= 2024 North Carolina Senate election =

- November 5, 2024

All 50 seats in the North Carolina Senate 26 seats needed for a majority
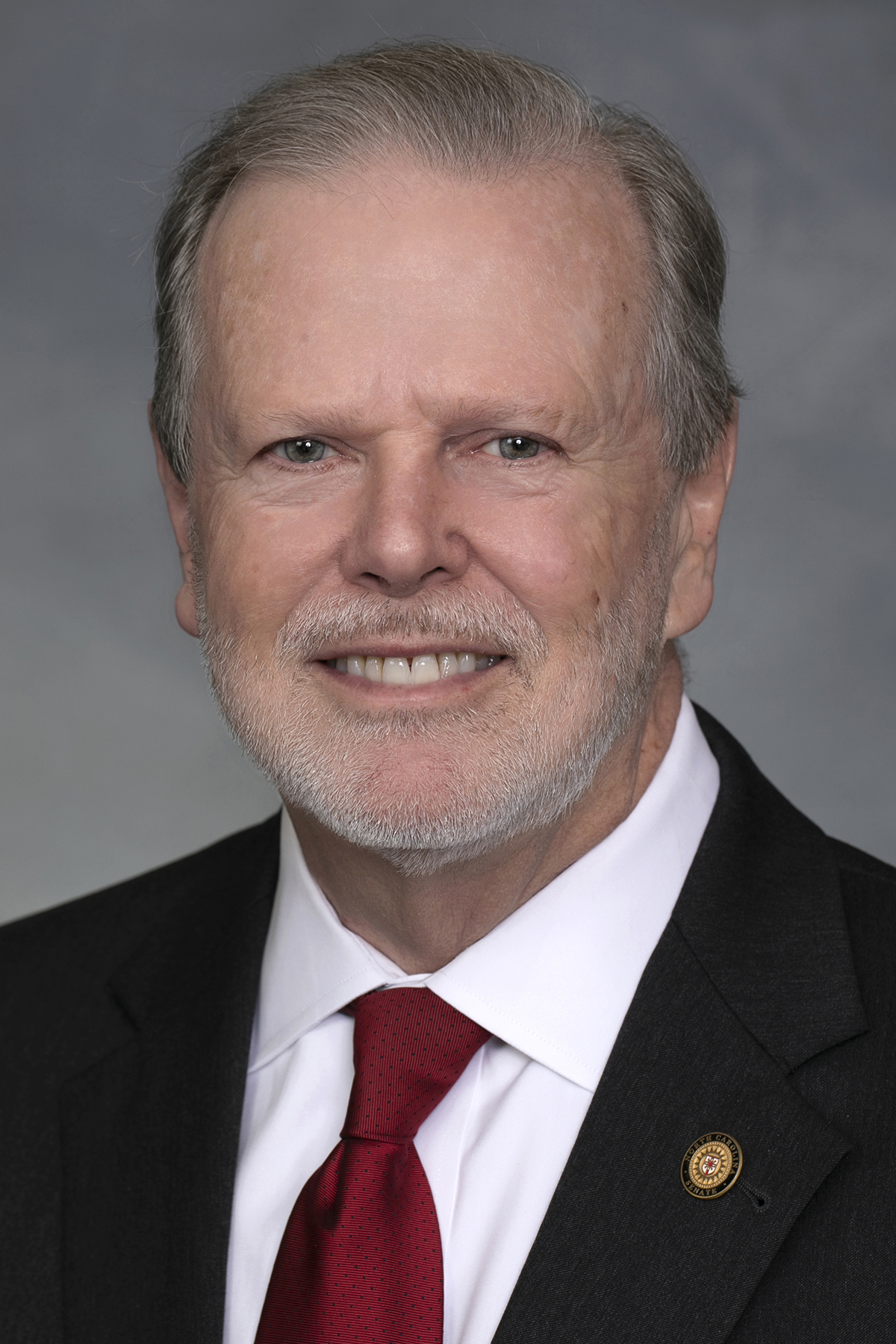

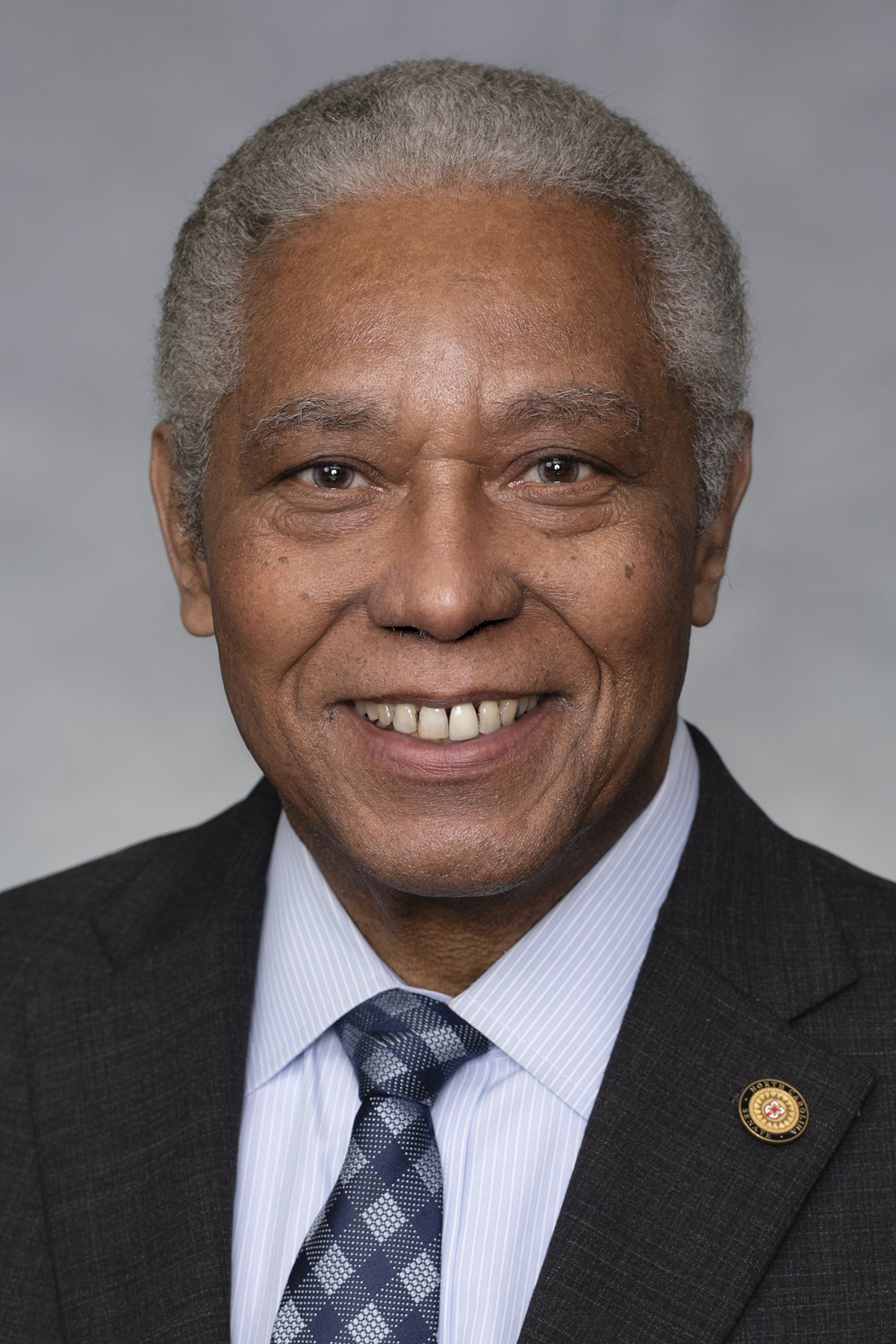
	Majority party	Minority party
Leader	Phil Berger	Dan Blue (retired as leader)
Party	Republican	Democratic
Leader since	January 1, 2005	March 2, 2014
Leader's seat	26th - Eden	14th - Raleigh
Last election	30	20
Seats won	30	20
Seat change	Steady	Steady
Popular vote	2,601,321	2,719,418
Percentage	47.98%	50.17%
Swing	▼10.75	▲9.63
- Republican hold Democratic hold Republican: 50–60% 60–70% 70–80% Democratic: 40–50% 50–60% 60-70% 70–80% 80–90% >90%
President pro tempore before election
Phil Berger
Republican
Elected President pro tempore
Phil Berger
Republican

The 2024 North Carolina Senate election was held on November 5, 2024, to elect all 50 members to North Carolina's Senate. The election coincided with elections for other offices, including for the U.S. President, U.S. House of Representatives, Council of State, and state house. The primary election was held on March 5, 2024. Ahead of the election, districts were redrawn and passed the General Assembly in Senate Bill 758. Republicans had no change in seats, leaving their supermajority to 30 out of 50 seats.

== Results summary ==
District	Incumbent	Party	Elected	Party
1st	Bobby Hanig (Note: Redistricted from the 3rd district.)	Rep	Bobby Hanig	Rep
2nd	Norman Sanderson (Note: Redistricted from the 1st district.)	Rep	Norman Sanderson	Rep
3rd	Bob Brinson (Note: Redistricted from the 2nd district.)	Rep	Bob Brinson	Rep
4th	Buck Newton	Rep	Buck Newton	Rep
5th	Kandie Smith	Dem	Kandie Smith	Dem
6th	Michael Lazzara	Rep	Michael Lazzara	Rep
7th	Michael Lee	Rep	Michael Lee	Rep
8th	Bill Rabon	Rep	Bill Rabon	Rep
9th	Brent Jackson	Rep	Brent Jackson	Rep
10th	Benton Sawrey	Rep	Benton Sawrey	Rep
11th	Lisa Stone Barnes	Rep	Lisa Stone Barnes	Rep
12th	Jim Burgin	Rep	Jim Burgin	Rep
13th	Lisa Grafstein	Dem	Lisa Grafstein	Dem
14th	Dan Blue	Dem	Dan Blue	Dem
15th	Jay Chaudhuri	Dem	Jay Chaudhuri	Dem
16th	Gale Adcock	Dem	Gale Adcock	Dem
17th	Sydney Batch	Dem	Sydney Batch	Dem
18th	Mary Wills Bode†	Dem	Terence Everitt	Dem
19th	Val Applewhite	Dem	Val Applewhite	Dem
20th	Natalie Murdock	Dem	Natalie Murdock	Dem
21st	Tom McInnis	Rep	Tom McInnis	Rep
22nd	Mike Woodard	Dem	Sophia Chitlik	Dem
23rd	Graig Meyer	Dem	Graig Meyer	Dem
24th	Danny Britt	Rep	Danny Britt	Rep
25th	Amy Galey	Rep	Amy Galey	Rep
26th	Phil Berger	Rep	Phil Berger	Rep
27th	Michael Garrett	Dem	Michael Garrett	Dem
28th	Gladys Robinson	Dem	Gladys Robinson	Dem
29th	Dave Craven	Rep	Dave Craven	Rep
30th	Steve Jarvis	Rep	Steve Jarvis	Rep
31st	Joyce Krawiec†	Rep	Dana Caudill Jones	Rep
32nd	Paul Lowe Jr.	Dem	Paul Lowe Jr.	Dem
33rd	Carl Ford	Rep	Carl Ford	Rep
34th	Paul Newton	Rep	Paul Newton	Rep
35th	Todd Johnson	Rep	Todd Johnson	Rep
36th	Eddie Settle	Rep	Eddie Settle	Rep
37th	Vickie Sawyer	Rep	Vickie Sawyer	Rep
37th	Natasha Marcus† (Note: Redistricted from the 41st district.)	Dem	Vickie Sawyer	Rep
38th	Mujtaba Mohammed	Dem	Mujtaba Mohammed	Dem
39th	DeAndrea Salvador	Dem	DeAndrea Salvador	Dem
40th	Joyce Waddell	Dem	Joyce Waddell	Dem
41st	New seat		Caleb Theodros	Dem
42nd	Rachel Hunt†	Dem	Woodson Bradley	Dem
43rd	Brad Overcash	Rep	Brad Overcash	Rep
44th	Ted Alexander	Rep	Ted Alexander	Rep
45th	Dean Proctor†	Rep	Mark Hollo	Rep
46th	Warren Daniel	Rep	Warren Daniel	Rep
47th	Ralph Hise	Rep	Ralph Hise	Rep
48th	Tim Moffitt	Rep	Tim Moffitt	Rep
49th	Julie Mayfield	Dem	Julie Mayfield	Dem
50th	Kevin Corbin	Rep	Kevin Corbin	Rep

† - Incumbent not seeking re-election

Summary of the November 5, 2024 North Carolina Senate election
Party	Candidates	Votes		Seats		
Party	Candidates	No.	%	Up	Won	+/–
Republican	42	2,601,321	47.987	30	30	Steady
Democratic	50	2,719,418	50.165	20	20	Steady
Libertarian	13	76,435	1.410	0	0	Steady
We the People	1	17,569	0.324	0	0	Steady
Constitution	1	6,007	0.111	0	0	Steady
Write-in	1	193	0.004	0	0	Steady
Total	108	5,420,943	100	50	50	Steady

Senate seats
Republican	60%
Democratic	40%

Popular vote
Democratic	50.165%
Republican	47.986%
Libertarian	1.410%
We The People	0.324%
Green	0.111%
Write-in	0.004%

=== Close races ===
Districts where the margin of victory was under 10%:

1. District 18, 0.11%
2. District 42, 0.16%
3. District 11, 2.58%
4. District 13, 3.32%
5. District 7, 8.47%
6. District 34, 8.74%

== Retiring incumbents ==
=== Democrats ===
- District 18: Mary Wills Bode retired.
- District 41: Natasha Marcus retired to run for Insurance Commissioner.
- District 42: Rachel Hunt retired to run for Lieutenant Governor.

=== Republicans ===
- District 31: Joyce Krawiec retired.
- District 45: Dean Proctor retired.

== Incumbents defeated in the primary election ==
=== Democrats ===
- District 22: Mike Woodard lost renomination to Sophia Chitlik.

=== Newly created seats ===
- District 41 (Mecklenburg County)

== Predictions ==
Source	Ranking	As of
Sabato's Crystal Ball	Likely R	October 23, 2024

== Detailed results ==
=== Districts 1–25 ===
==== District 1 ====
The new 1st district includes all of Bertie, Camden, Currituck, Dare, Gates, Hertford, Northampton, Pasquotank, Perquimans, and Tyrrell counties. It includes the home of incumbent Republican Bobby Hanig, who has represented the 3rd district and its predecessors since 2022.

North Carolina Senate 1st district general election, 2024
Party	Candidate	Votes	%
Republican	Bobby Hanig (incumbent)	62,805	57.21%
Democratic	Susan Harman-Scott	46,979	42.79%
Total votes		109,784	100%
Republican hold			

==== District 2 ====
The new 2nd district includes all of Carteret, Chowan, Halifax, Hyde, Martin, Pamlico, Warren, and Washington counties. It includes the home of incumbent Republican Norman Sanderson, who has represented the 1st district and its predecessors since 2013.

North Carolina Senate 2nd district general election, 2024
Party	Candidate	Votes	%
Republican	Norman Sanderson (incumbent)	63,006	56.05%
Democratic	Tare Davis	47,001	41.81%
Libertarian	Maria Cormos	2,406	2.14%
Total votes		112,413	100%
Republican hold			

==== District 3 ====
The new 3rd district includes all of Beaufort, Craven, and Lenoir counties. It includes the home of incumbent Republican Bob Brinson, who has represented the 2nd district since 2024. Brinson was appointed on July 23, 2024, following the resignation of Jim Perry, who had previously announced his retirement on December 15, 2023.

North Carolina Senate 3rd district Republican primary election, 2024
Party	Candidate	Votes	%
Republican	Bob Brinson	13,211	54.41%
Republican	Michael Speciale	11,069	45.59%
Total votes		24,280	100%

North Carolina Senate 3rd district general election, 2024
Party	Candidate	Votes	%
Republican	Bob Brinson (incumbent)	64,025	59.99%
Democratic	Charles Dudley	42,704	40.01%
Total votes		106,729	100%
Republican hold			

==== District 4 ====
The new 4th district includes all of Greene, Wayne, and Wilson counties. The incumbent is Republican Buck Newton, who has represented the 4th district since 2023.

North Carolina Senate 4th district general election, 2024
Party	Candidate	Votes	%
Republican	Buck Newton (incumbent)	55,389	55.12%
Democratic	Raymond Smith Jr.	45,096	44.88%
Total votes		100,485	100%
Republican hold			

==== District 5 ====
The new 5th district includes all of Edgecombe and Pitt counties. The incumbent is Democrat Kandie Smith. who has represented the 5th district since 2023.

North Carolina Senate 5th district general election, 2024
Party	Candidate	Votes	%
Democratic	Kandie Smith (incumbent)	59,440	55.08%
Republican	Alexander Paschall	48,469	44.92%
Total votes		107,909	100%
Democratic hold			

==== District 6 ====
The new 6th district includes all of Onslow County. The incumbent is Republican Michael Lazzara, who has represented the 6th district since 2021.

North Carolina Senate 6th district general election, 2024
Party	Candidate	Votes	%
Republican	Michael Lazzara (incumbent)	53,923	69.63%
Democratic	Andi Morrow	23,519	30.37%
Total votes		77,442	100%
Republican hold			

==== District 7 ====
The new 7th district includes most of New Hanover County. The incumbent is Republican Michael Lee, who has represented the 7th district and its predecessors since 2021.

North Carolina Senate 7th district general election, 2024
Party	Candidate	Votes	%
Republican	Michael Lee (incumbent)	63,217	52.21%
Democratic	David Hill	52,953	43.74%
Libertarian	John Evans	4,903	4.05%
Total votes		121,073	100%
Republican hold			

==== District 8 ====
The new 8th district includes all of Brunswick and Columbus counties, as well as a small portion of New Hanover County. The incumbent is Republican Bill Rabon, who has represented the 8th district since 2011.

North Carolina Senate 8th district general election, 2024
Party	Candidate	Votes	%
Republican	Bill Rabon (incumbent)	87,026	59.90%
Democratic	Katherine Randall	58,259	40.10%
Total votes		145,285	100%
Republican hold			

==== District 9 ====
The new 9th district includes all of Bladen, Duplin, Jones, and Pender counties, as well as most of Sampson County. The incumbent is Republican Brent Jackson, who has represented the 9th district and its predecessors since 2011.

North Carolina Senate 9th district general election, 2024
Party	Candidate	Votes	%
Republican	Brent Jackson (incumbent)	68,632	65.03%
Democratic	Jamie Campbell Bowles	36,900	34.97%
Total votes		105,532	100%
Republican hold			

==== District 10 ====
The new 10th district includes all of Johnston County. The incumbent is Republican Benton Sawrey, who has represented the 10th district since 2023.

North Carolina Senate 10th district general election, 2024
Party	Candidate	Votes	%
Republican	Benton Sawrey (incumbent)	70,773	58.75%
Democratic	Felicia Baxter	45,346	37.64%
Libertarian	Christopher Sessions	4,351	3.61%
Total votes		120,470	100%
Republican hold			

==== District 11 ====
The new 11th district includes all of Franklin, Nash, and Vance counties. The incumbent is Republican Lisa Stone Barnes has represented the 11th district since 2021.

North Carolina Senate 11th district general election, 2024
Party	Candidate	Votes	%
Republican	Lisa Stone Barnes (incumbent)	57,713	51.29%
Democratic	James Mercer	54,806	48.71%
Total votes		112,519	100%
Republican hold			

==== District 12 ====
The new 12th district includes all of Harnett and Lee counties, as well as a small portion of Sampson County. The incumbent is Republican Jim Burgin, who has represented the 12th district since 2019.

North Carolina Senate 12th district general election, 2024
Party	Candidate	Votes	%
Republican	Jim Burgin (incumbent)	57,151	61.61%
Democratic	Tanya White Anderson	35,611	38.39%
Total votes		92,762	100%
Republican hold			

==== District 13 ====
The new 13th district includes portions of southern Wake County. The incumbent is Democrat Lisa Grafstein, who has represented the 13th district since 2023.

North Carolina Senate 13th district Republican primary election, 2024
Party	Candidate	Votes	%
Republican	Scott Lassiter	11,636	52.94%
Republican	Vicki Harry	10,345	47.06%
Total votes		21,981	100%

North Carolina Senate 13th district general election, 2024
Party	Candidate	Votes	%
Democratic	Lisa Grafstein (incumbent)	64,074	50.21%
Republican	Scott Lassiter	59,829	46.89%
Libertarian	Susan Hogarth	3,700	2.90%
Total votes		127,603	100%
Democratic hold			

==== District 14 ====
The new 14th district includes portions of eastern Wake County. The incumbent is Democratic Minority Leader Dan Blue, who has represented the 14th district since 2009.

North Carolina Senate 14th district Democratic primary election, 2024
Party	Candidate	Votes	%
Democratic	Dan Blue (incumbent)	16,816	85.51%
Democratic	Terry Passione	2,850	14.49%
Total votes		19,666	100%

North Carolina Senate 14th district general election, 2024
Party	Candidate	Votes	%
Democratic	Dan Blue (incumbent)	74,519	73.46%
Republican	Angela McCarty	23,978	23.64%
Libertarian	Sammie Brooks	2,945	2.90%
Total votes		101,442	100%
Democratic hold			

==== District 15 ====
The new 15th district includes portions of central Wake County. The incumbent is Democrat Jay Chaudhuri, who has represented the 15th district and its predecessors since 2016.

North Carolina Senate district general election, 2024
Party	Candidate	Votes	%
Democratic	Jay Chaudhuri (incumbent)	67,355	65.95%
Republican	David Bankert	30,867	30.22%
Libertarian	Kat McDonald	3,915	3.83%
Total votes		102,137	100%
Democratic hold			

==== District 16 ====
The new 16th district includes portions of western Wake County. The incumbent is Democrat Gale Adcock, who has represented the 16th district since 2023.

North Carolina Senate 16th district general election, 2024
Party	Candidate	Votes	%
Democratic	Gale Adcock (incumbent)	84,424	100%
Total votes		84,424	100%
Democratic hold			

==== District 17 ====
The new 17th district includes portions of western Wake County. The incumbent is Democrat Sydney Batch, who has represented the 17th district since 2021.

North Carolina Senate 17th district general election, 2024
Party	Candidate	Votes	%
Democratic	Sydney Batch (incumbent)	71,610	74.38%
Libertarian	Patrick Bowersox	24,661	25.62%
Total votes		96,271	100%
Democratic hold			

==== District 18 ====
The new 18th district includes all of Granville County, as well as portions of northern Wake County. The incumbent is Democrat Mary Wills Bode, who has represented the 18th district since 2023. On December 14, 2023, Bode announced she would retire after one term in office.

North Carolina Senate 18th district general election, 2024
Party	Candidate	Votes	%
Democratic	Terence Everitt	59,667	48.47%
Republican	Ashlee Bryan Adams	59,539	48.36%
Libertarian	Brad Hessel	3,906	3.17%
Total votes		123,112	100%
Democratic hold			

==== District 19 ====
The new 19th district includes portions of Cumberland County. The incumbent is Democrat Val Applewhite, who has represented the 19th district since 2023.

North Carolina Senate 19th district general election, 2024
Party	Candidate	Votes	%
Democratic	Val Applewhite (incumbent)	55,697	62.87%
Republican	Semone Pemberton	30,005	33.87%
Libertarian	Steven Swinton	2,884	3.26%
Total votes		88,586	100%
Democratic hold			

==== District 20 ====
The new 20th district includes all of Chatham County, as well as portions of southern Durham County. The incumbent is Democrat Natalie Murdock, who has represented the 20th district since 2020.

North Carolina Senate 20th district general election, 2024
Party	Candidate	Votes	%
Democratic	Natalie Murdock (incumbent)	90,128	72.28%
Republican	Christopher Partain	34,570	27.72%
Total votes		124,698	100%
Democratic hold			

==== District 21 ====
The new 21st district includes all of Moore County, as well as most of Cumberland County. The incumbent is Republican Tom McInnis, who has represented the 21st district and its predecessors since 2015.

North Carolina Senate 21st district general election, 2024
Party	Candidate	Votes	%
Republican	Tom McInnis (incumbent)	67,494	62.76%
Democratic	Maurice (Butch) Holland Jr.	40,052	37.24%
Total votes		107,546	100%
Republican hold			

==== District 22 ====
The new 22nd district includes most of Durham County. The incumbent is Democrat Mike Woodard, who has represented the 22nd district since 2013.

North Carolina Senate 22nd district Democratic primary election, 2024
Party	Candidate	Votes	%
Democratic	Sophia Chitlik	17,270	57.59%
Democratic	Mike Woodard (incumbent)	12,719	42.41%
Total votes		29,989	100%

North Carolina Senate 22nd district general election, 2024
Party	Candidate	Votes	%
Democratic	Sophia Chitlik	83,844	85.98%
Libertarian	Ray Ubinger	13,674	14.02%
Total votes		97,518	100%
Democratic hold			

==== District 23 ====
The new 23rd district includes all of Caswell, Orange, and Person counties. The incumbent is Democrat Graig Meyer, who has represented the 23rd district since 2023.

North Carolina Senate 23rd district general election, 2024
Party	Candidate	Votes	%
Democratic	Graig Meyer (incumbent)	77,146	65.85%
Republican	Laura Pichardo	40,011	34.15%
Total votes		117,157	100%
Democratic hold			

==== District 24 ====
The new 24th district includes all of Hoke, Robeson, and Scotland counties. The incumbent is Republican Danny Britt, who has represented the 24th district and its predecessors since 2017.

North Carolina Senate 24th district general election, 2024
Party	Candidate	Votes	%
Republican	Danny Britt (incumbent)	47,538	58.74%
Democratic	Kathy Batt	33,387	41.26%
Total votes		80,925	100%
Republican hold			

==== District 25 ====
The new 25th district includes all of Alamance County, as well as portions of northern Randolph County. The incumbent is Republican Amy Galey, who has represented the 25th district and its predecessors since 2021.

North Carolina Senate 25th district Democratic primary election, 2024
Party	Candidate	Votes	%
Democratic	Donna Vanhook	7,162	76.14%
Democratic	John Coleman	2,244	23.86%
Total votes		9,406	100%

North Carolina Senate 25th district general election, 2024
Party	Candidate	Votes	%
Republican	Amy Galey (incumbent)	67,762	60.25%
Democratic	Donna Vanhook	44,711	39.75%
Total votes		112,473	100%
Republican hold			

=== Districts 26–50 ===
==== District 26 ====
The new 26th district includes all of Rockingham County, as well as most of Guilford County. The incumbent is Republican President pro tempore Phil Berger, who has represented the 26th district and its predecessors since 2001.

North Carolina Senate 26th district general election, 2024
Party	Candidate	Votes	%
Republican	Phil Berger (incumbent)	67,081	54.06%
Democratic	Steve Luking	51,007	41.10%
Constitution	Alvin Robinson	6,007	4.84%
Total votes		124,095	100%
Republican hold			

==== District 27 ====
The new 27th district includes portions of western Guilford County. The incumbent is Democrat Michael Garrett, who has represented the 27th district since 2019.

North Carolina Senate 27th district general election, 2024
Party	Candidate	Votes	%
Democratic	Michael Garrett (incumbent)	65,146	60.79%
Republican	Paul Schumacher	42,011	39.21%
Total votes		107,157	100%
Democratic hold			

==== District 28 ====
The new 28th district includes potions of central Guilford County. The incumbent is Democrat Gladys Robinson, who has represented the 28th district since 2011.

North Carolina Senate 28th district general election, 2024
Party	Candidate	Votes	%
Democratic	Gladys Robinson (incumbent)	78,876	100%
Total votes		78,876	100%
Democratic hold			

==== District 29 ====
The new 29th district includes all of Anson, Montgomery, and Richmond counties, as well as most of Randolph County, and portions of eastern Union County. The incumbent is Republican Dave Craven, who has represented the 29th district and its predecessors since 2020.

North Carolina Senate 29th district general election, 2024
Party	Candidate	Votes	%
Republican	Dave Craven (incumbent)	70,881	68.55%
Democratic	Kevin Clark	32,519	31.45%
Total votes		103,400	100%
Republican hold			

==== District 30 ====
The new 30th district includes all of Davidson and Davie counties. The incumbent is Republican Steve Jarvis, who has represented the 30th district and its predecessors since 2021.

North Carolina Senate 30th district general election, 2024
Party	Candidate	Votes	%
Republican	Steve Jarvis (incumbent)	86,181	72.64%
Democratic	Tina Royal	29,294	24.69%
Libertarian	Daniel Cavender	3,161	2.66%
Total votes		118,636	100%
Republican hold			

==== District 31 ====
The new 31st district includes all of Stokes County, as well as most of Forsyth County. The incumbent is Republican Joyce Krawiec, who has represented the 31st district since 2014. On December 4, 2023, Krawiec announced she would retire after six terms.

North Carolina Senate 31st district Democratic primary election, 2024
Party	Candidate	Votes	%
Democratic	Ronda Mays	6,241	53.78%
Democratic	Laurelyn Dossett	5,363	46.22%
Total votes		11,604	100%

North Carolina Senate 31st district general election, 2024
Party	Candidate	Votes	%
Republican	Dana Caudill Jones	78,429	62.42%
Democratic	Ronda Mays	47,035	37.43%
Write-in		186	0.15%
Independent	Teresa Hopper Prizer (write-in)	7	0.01%
Total votes		125,657	100%
Republican hold			

==== District 32 ====
The new 32nd district includes portions of southern Forsyth County. The incumbent is Democrat Paul Lowe Jr., who has represented the 32nd district since 2015.

North Carolina Senate 32nd district Democratic primary election, 2024
Party	Candidate	Votes	%
Democratic	Paul Lowe Jr. (incumbent)	11,794	64.58%
Democratic	Gardenia Henley	6,469	35.42%
Total votes		18,263	100%

North Carolina Senate 32nd district general election, 2024
Party	Candidate	Votes	%
Democratic	Paul Lowe Jr. (incumbent)	67,131	68.97%
Republican	George Ware	27,442	28.19%
Libertarian	Zac Lentz	2,758	2.83%
Total votes		97,331	100%
Democratic hold			

==== District 33 ====
The new 33rd district includes all of Rowan and Stanly counties. The incumbent is Republican Carl Ford, who has represented the 33rd district since 2019.

North Carolina Senate 33rd district general election, 2024
Party	Candidate	Votes	%
Republican	Carl Ford (incumbent)	77,115	70.99%
Democratic	Tangela (Lucy Horne) Morgan	31,509	29.01%
Total votes		108,624	100%
Republican hold			

==== District 34 ====
The new 34th district includes most of Cabarrus County. The incumbent is Republican Majority Leader Paul Newton, who has represented the 34th district and its predecessors since 2017.

North Carolina Senate 34th district general election, 2024
Party	Candidate	Votes	%
Republican	Paul Newton (incumbent)	58,166	52.93%
Democratic	Kim Sexton-Lewter	48,558	44.19%
Libertarian	Thomas Hill	3,171	2.89%
Total votes		109,895	100%
Republican hold			

==== District 35 ====
The new 35th district includes most of Union County, as well as a small portion of southern Cabarrus County. The incumbent is Republican Todd Johnson, who has represented the 35th district since 2019.

North Carolina Senate 35th district general election, 2024
Party	Candidate	Votes	%
Republican	Todd Johnson (incumbent)	82,030	63.34%
Democratic	Robin Mann	47,486	36.66%
Total votes		129,516	100%
Republican hold			

==== District 36 ====
The new 36th district includes all of Alexander, Surry, Wilkes, and Yadkin counties. The incumbent is Republican Eddie Settle, who has represented the 36th district since 2023.

North Carolina Senate 36th district general election, 2024
Party	Candidate	Votes	%
Republican	Eddie Settle (incumbent)	88,102	78.98%
Democratic	Darren Staley	23,444	21.02%
Total votes		111,546	100%
Republican hold			

==== District 37 ====
The new 37th district includes all of Iredell County, as well as a small portion of northern Mecklenburg County. It includes the homes of incumbent Republican Vickie Sawyer, who has represented the 34th district since 2019, and incumbent Democrat Natasha Marcus, who has represented the 41st district since 2019. On November 14, 2023, Marcus announced she would retire after three terms, announcing a run for Insurance Commissioner on December 19, 2023.

North Carolina Senate 37th district general election, 2024
Party	Candidate	Votes	%
Republican	Vickie Sawyer (incumbent)	82,832	64.73%
Democratic	Kate Compton Barr	45,129	35.27%
Total votes		127,961	100%
Republican hold			

==== District 38 ====
The new 38th district includes portions of northern Mecklenburg County. The incumbent is Democrat Mujtaba Mohammed, who has represented the 38th district since 2019.

North Carolina Senate 38th district general election, 2024
Party	Candidate	Votes	%
Democratic	Mujtaba Mohammed (incumbent)	94,162	100%
Total votes		94,162	100%
Democratic hold			

==== District 39 ====
The new 39th district includes portions of southwestern Mecklenburg County. The incumbent is Democrat DeAndrea Salvador has represented the 39th district since 2021.

North Carolina Senate 39th district general election, 2024
Party	Candidate	Votes	%
Democratic	DeAndrea Salvador (incumbent)	88,183	100%
Total votes		88,183	100%
Democratic hold			

==== District 40 ====
The new 40th district includes portions of eastern Mecklenburg County. The incumbent is Democrat Joyce Waddell, who has represented the 40th district since 2015.

North Carolina Senate 40th district general election, 2024
Party	Candidate	Votes	%
Democratic	Joyce Waddell (incumbent)	67,654	79.38%
We the People	Jeff Scott	17,569	20.62%
Total votes		85,223	100%
Democratic hold			

==== District 41 ====
The new 41st district includes portions of central Mecklenburg County and has no incumbent.

North Carolina Senate 41st district Democratic primary election, 2024
Party	Candidate	Votes	%
Democratic	Caleb Theodros	7,230	42.84%
Democratic	Lucille Puckett	5,268	31.22%
Democratic	Kendrick Cunningham	2,784	16.50%
Democratic	Robert Bruns	1,593	9.44%
Total votes		16,875	100%

North Carolina Senate 41st district general election, 2024
Party	Candidate	Votes	%
Democratic	Caleb Theodros	95,805	100%
Total votes		95,805	100%
Democratic win (new seat)			

==== District 42 ====
The new 42nd district includes all of southeastern Mecklenburg County. The incumbent is Democrat Rachel Hunt, who has represented the 42nd district since 2023. On March 1, 2023, Hunt announced she would retire after one term to run for Lieutenant Governor.

North Carolina Senate 42nd district Republican primary election, 2024
Party	Candidate	Votes	%
Republican	Stacie McGinn	11,336	51.72%
Republican	Jaime Daniell	10,584	48.28%
Total votes		21,920	100%

North Carolina Senate 42nd district general election, 2024
Party	Candidate	Votes	%
Democratic	Woodson Bradley	62,260	50.08%
Republican	Stacie McGinn	62,051	49.92%
Total votes		124,311	100%
Democratic hold			

==== District 43 ====
The new 43rd district includes most of Gaston County. The incumbent is Republican Brad Overcash, who has represented the 43rd district since 2023.

North Carolina Senate 43rd district general election, 2024
Party	Candidate	Votes	%
Republican	Brad Overcash (incumbent)	66,112	61.78%
Democratic	Corey Creech	40,893	38.22%
Total votes		107,005	100%
Republican hold			

==== District 44 ====
The new 44th district includes all of Cleveland and Lincoln counties, as well as portions of northwestern Gaston County. The incumbent is Republican Ted Alexander, who has represented the 44th district since 2019.

North Carolina Senate 44th district general election, 2024
Party	Candidate	Votes	%
Republican	Ted Alexander (incumbent)	81,809	72.50%
Democratic	Henry Herzberg	31,033	27.50%
Total votes		112,842	100%
Republican hold			

==== District 45 ====
The new 45th district includes all of Catawba County, as well as portions of southern Caldwell County. The incumbent is Republican Dean Proctor, who has represented the 45th district and its predecessors since 2020. On November 19, 2023, Proctor announced he would retire after three terms.

North Carolina Senate 45th district Republican primary election, 2024
Party	Candidate	Votes	%
Republican	Mark Hollo	16,390	60.40%
Republican	Nancy Meek	10,746	39.60%
Total votes		27,136	100%

North Carolina Senate 45th district general election, 2024
Party	Candidate	Votes	%
Republican	Mark Hollo	80,033	70.28%
Democratic	Kim Bost	33,840	29.72%
Total votes		113,873	100%
Republican hold			

==== District 46 ====
The new 46th district includes all of Burke and McDowell counties, as well as portions of Buncombe County. The incumbent Republican is Warren Daniel, who has represented the 46th district and its predecessors since 2011.

North Carolina Senate 46th district general election, 2024
Party	Candidate	Votes	%
Republican	Warren Daniel (incumbent)	68,675	65.23%
Democratic	John Ager	36,604	34.77%
Total votes		105,279	100%
Republican hold			

==== District 47 ====
The new 47th district includes all of Alleghany, Ashe, Avery, Madison, Mitchell, Watauga, and Yancey counties, as well as portions of Caldwell and Haywood counties. The incumbent is Republican Ralph Hise, who has represented the 47th district since 2011.

North Carolina Senate 47th district general election, 2024
Party	Candidate	Votes	%
Republican	Ralph Hise (incumbent)	75,607	64.15%
Democratic	Frank Patton Hughes III	42,247	35.85%
Total votes		117,854	100%
Republican hold			

==== District 48 ====
The new 48th district includes all of Henderson, Polk, and Rutherford counties. The incumbent is Republican Tim Moffitt, who has represented the 48th district since 2023.

North Carolina Senate 48th district general election, 2024
Party	Candidate	Votes	%
Republican	Tim Moffitt (incumbent)	73,373	63.93%
Democratic	Chris Walters	41,399	36.07%
Total votes		114,772	100%
Republican hold			

==== District 49 ====
The new 49th district includes most of Buncombe County. The incumbent is Democrat Julie Mayfield, who has represented the 49th district since 2021.

North Carolina Senate 49th district general election, 2024
Party	Candidate	Votes	%
Democratic	Julie Mayfield (incumbent)	81,037	69.07%
Republican	Kristie Tincher Sluder	36,288	30.93%
Total votes		117,325	100%
Democratic hold			

==== District 50 ====
The new 50th district includes most of Cherokee, Clay, Graham, Jackson, Macon, Swain, and Transylvania counties, as well as most of Haywood County. The incumbent is Republican Kevin Corbin, who has represented the 50th district since 2021.

North Carolina Senate 50th district general election, 2024
Party	Candidate	Votes	%
Republican	Kevin Corbin (incumbent)	83,381	66.53%
Democratic	Adam Tebrugge	41,939	33.47%
Total votes		125,320	100%
Republican hold			

== See also ==
- 2024 North Carolina elections
- 2024 North Carolina House of Representatives election
- List of North Carolina state legislatures
