= North Carolina's 88th House district =

American legislative district

North Carolina's 88th State House of Representatives district
Representative
Mary Belk; D–Charlotte
- Demographics: 44% White; 21% Black; 25% Hispanic; 5% Asian; 1% Other; 4% Multiracial
- Population (2024): 88,161

North Carolina's 88th House district is one of 120 districts in the North Carolina House of Representatives. It has been represented by Democrat Mary Belk since 2017.

== Geography ==
Since 2013, the district has included part of Mecklenburg County. The district overlaps with the 39th, 41st, and 42nd Senate districts.

== District officeholders ==
Representative	Party	Dates	Notes	Counties
District created January 1, 1993.
Theresa Esposito (Winston-Salem)	Republican	January 1, 1993 – January 1, 2003	Redistricted from the 39th district. Redistricted to the 93rd district and retired.	1993–2003; Part of Forsyth County.
Mark Hilton (Conover)	Republican	January 1, 2003 – January 1, 2005	Redistricted from the 45th district. Redistricted to the 96th district.	2003–2005; Part of Catawba County.
Mark Hollo (Taylorsville)	Republican	January 1, 2005 – January 1, 2007	Lost re-election.	2005–2013; All of Alexander County. Part of Catawba County.
Ray Warren (Hiddenite)	Democratic	January 1, 2007 – January 1, 2011	Retired.	2005–2013; All of Alexander County. Part of Catawba County.
Mark Hollo (Taylorsville)	Republican	January 1, 2011 – January 1, 2013	Redistricted to the 73rd district.	2005–2013; All of Alexander County. Part of Catawba County.
Rob Bryan (Charlotte)	Republican	January 1, 2013 – January 1, 2017	Lost re-election.	2013–Present; Part of Mecklenburg County.
Mary Belk (Charlotte)	Democratic	January 1, 2017 – Present		2013–Present; Part of Mecklenburg County.

== Election results ==
=== 2024 ===
North Carolina House of Representatives 88th district general election, 2024
Party	Candidate	Votes	%
Democratic	Mary Belk (incumbent)	33,555	100%
Total votes		33,555	100%
Democratic hold			

=== 2022 ===
North Carolina House of Representatives 88th district general election, 2022
Party	Candidate	Votes	%
Democratic	Mary Belk (incumbent)	19,020	69.27%
Republican	Anne Marie Peacock	8,438	30.73%
Total votes		27,458	100%
Democratic hold			

=== 2020 ===
North Carolina House of Representatives 88th district general election, 2020
Party	Candidate	Votes	%
Democratic	Mary Belk (incumbent)	31,647	63.11%
Republican	David Tondreau	18,497	36.89%
Total votes		50,144	100%
Democratic hold			

=== 2018 ===
North Carolina House of Representatives 88th district Republican primary election, 2018
Party	Candidate	Votes	%
Republican	Ty Turner	433	62.12%
Republican	Benton Blaine	264	37.88%
Total votes		697	100%

North Carolina House of Representatives 88th district general election, 2018
Party	Candidate	Votes	%
Democratic	Mary Belk (incumbent)	22,561	75.63%
Republican	Ty Turner	7,268	24.37%
Total votes		29,829	100%
Democratic hold			

=== 2016 ===
North Carolina House of Representatives 88th district general election, 2016
Party	Candidate	Votes	%
Democratic	Mary Belk	21,754	50.54%
Republican	Rob Bryan (incumbent)	21,286	49.46%
Total votes		43,040	100%
Democratic gain from Republican			

=== 2014 ===
North Carolina House of Representatives 88th district general election, 2014
Party	Candidate	Votes	%
Republican	Rob Bryan (incumbent)	14,644	55.37%
Democratic	Margie Storch	11,805	44.63%
Total votes		26,449	100%
Republican hold			

=== 2012 ===
North Carolina House of Representatives 88th district general election, 2012
Party	Candidate	Votes	%
Republican	Rob Bryan	22,081	54.95%
Democratic	Martha Alexander (incumbent)	18,106	45.05%
Total votes		40,187	100%
Republican gain from Democratic			

=== 2010 ===
North Carolina House of Representatives 88th district general election, 2010
Party	Candidate	Votes	%
Republican	Mark Hollo	13,587	64.36%
Democratic	David Munday	7,525	35.64%
Total votes		21,112	100%
Republican gain from Democratic			

=== 2008 ===
North Carolina House of Representatives 88th district general election, 2008
Party	Candidate	Votes	%
Democratic	Ray Warren (incumbent)	15,729	50.33%
Republican	Mark Hollo	15,520	49.67%
Total votes		31,249	100%
Democratic hold			

=== 2006 ===
North Carolina House of Representatives 88th district general election, 2006
Party	Candidate	Votes	%
Democratic	Ray Warren	9,650	52.61%
Republican	Mark Hollo (incumbent)	8,693	47.39%
Total votes		18,343	100%
Democratic gain from Republican			

=== 2004 ===
North Carolina House of Representatives 88th district Republican Primary election, 2004
Party	Candidate	Votes	%
Republican	Mark Hollo	2,264	42.63%
Republican	Grimes Byerly	1,935	36.43%
Republican	Jill Griffin	819	15.42%
Republican	William "Ray" Henderson	293	5.52%
Total votes		5,311	100%

North Carolina House of Representatives 88th district general election, 2004
Party	Candidate	Votes	%
Republican	Mark Hollo	15,587	56.31%
Democratic	Joel Harbinson	12,096	43.69%
Total votes		27,683	100%
Republican win (new seat)			

=== 2002 ===
North Carolina House of Representatives 88th district Republican primary election, 2002
Party	Candidate	Votes	%
Republican	Mark Hilton (incumbent)	2,795	57.70%
Republican	T. Hamilton Ward	2,049	42.30%
Total votes		4,844	100%

North Carolina House of Representatives 88th district general election, 2002
Party	Candidate	Votes	%
Republican	Mark Hilton (incumbent)	12,549	100%
Total votes		12,549	100%
Republican hold			

=== 2000 ===
North Carolina House of Representatives 88th district general election, 2000
Party	Candidate	Votes	%
Republican	Theresa Esposito (incumbent)	19,041	100%
Total votes		19,041	100%
Republican hold			
