= North Carolina's 96th House district =

American legislative district

North Carolina's 96th State House of Representatives district
Representative
| Jay Adams; R–Hickory |
- Demographics: 68% White; 9% Black; 14% Hispanic; 5% Asian; 5% Multiracial
- Population (2024): 90,357

North Carolina's 96th House district is one of 120 districts in the North Carolina House of Representatives. It has been represented by Republican Jay Adams since 2015.

== Geography ==
Since 2005, the district has included part of Catawba County. The district overlaps with the 45th Senate district.

== District officeholders ==
| Representative | Party | Dates | Notes | Counties |
|---|---|---|---|---|
| District created January 1, 1993. | | | | 1993–2003; All of Bladen County. Parts of Cumberland, Sampson, Pender, and New Hanover counties. |
| Edd Nye (Elizabethtown) | Democratic | January 1, 1993 – January 1, 2003 | Redistricted from the 12th district. Redistricted to the 22nd district. | 1993–2003; All of Bladen County. Parts of Cumberland, Sampson, Pender, and New Hanover counties. |
| Frank Mitchell (Olin) | Republican | January 1, 2003 – January 1, 2005 | Redistricted from the 42nd district. Redistricted to the 79th district and lost re-nomination. | 2003–2005; Part of Iredell County. |
| Mark Hilton (Conover) | Republican | January 1, 2005 – January 1, 2013 | Redistricted from the 88th district. Retired. | 2005–Present; Part of Catawba County. |
| Andy Wells (Hickory) | Republican | January 1, 2013 – January 1, 2015 | Retired to run for State Senate. | 2005–Present; Part of Catawba County. |
| Jay Adams (Hickory) | Republican | January 1, 2015 – Present | | 2005–Present; Part of Catawba County. |

== Election results ==
=== 2024 ===
North Carolina House of Representatives 96th district general election, 2024
| Party | Candidate | Votes | % |
|---|---|---|---|
| Republican | Jay Adams (incumbent) | 28,037 | 64.21% |
| Democratic | Elizabeth (Eli) Glynn | 15,629 | 35.79% |
| Total votes | | 43,666 | 100% |
| Republican hold | | | |

=== 2022 ===
North Carolina House of Representatives 96th district general election, 2022
| Party | Candidate | Votes | % |
|---|---|---|---|
| Republican | Jay Adams (incumbent) | 22,016 | 100% |
| Total votes | | 22,016 | 100% |
| Republican hold | | | |

=== 2020 ===
North Carolina House of Representatives 96th district general election, 2020
| Party | Candidate | Votes | % |
|---|---|---|---|
| Republican | Jay Adams (incumbent) | 25,370 | 62.95% |
| Democratic | Kim Bost | 14,929 | 37.05% |
| Total votes | | 40,299 | 100% |
| Republican hold | | | |

=== 2018 ===
North Carolina House of Representatives 96th district Republican primary election, 2018
| Party | Candidate | Votes | % |
|---|---|---|---|
| Republican | Jay Adams (incumbent) | 6,013 | 69.69% |
| Republican | Taylor G. Huffman | 2,615 | 30.31% |
| Total votes | | 8,628 | 100% |

North Carolina House of Representatives 96th district general election, 2018
| Party | Candidate | Votes | % |
|---|---|---|---|
| Republican | Jay Adams (incumbent) | 16,285 | 60.74% |
| Democratic | Kim Bost | 10,527 | 39.26% |
| Total votes | | 26,812 | 100% |
| Republican hold | | | |

=== 2016 ===
North Carolina House of Representatives 96th district general election, 2016
| Party | Candidate | Votes | % |
|---|---|---|---|
| Republican | Jay Adams (incumbent) | 26,595 | 100% |
| Total votes | | 26,595 | 100% |
| Republican hold | | | |

=== 2014 ===
North Carolina House of Representatives 96th district Republican primary election, 2014
| Party | Candidate | Votes | % |
|---|---|---|---|
| Republican | Jay Adams | 3,450 | 54.14% |
| Republican | Frank Willis | 1,753 | 27.51% |
| Republican | Joe Fox | 1,078 | 16.92% |
| Republican | Wrappar Kellett | 91 | 1.43% |
| Total votes | | 6,372 | 100% |

North Carolina House of Representatives 96th district general election, 2014
| Party | Candidate | Votes | % |
|---|---|---|---|
| Republican | Jay Adams | 14,771 | 67.24% |
| Democratic | Cliff Moone | 7,196 | 32.76% |
| Total votes | | 21,967 | 100% |
| Republican hold | | | |

=== 2012 ===
North Carolina House of Representatives 96th district general election, 2012
| Party | Candidate | Votes | % |
|---|---|---|---|
| Republican | Andy Wells | 21,073 | 62.46% |
| Democratic | Cliff Moone | 12,664 | 37.54% |
| Total votes | | 33,737 | 100% |
| Republican hold | | | |

=== 2010 ===
North Carolina House of Representatives 96th district general election, 2010
| Party | Candidate | Votes | % |
|---|---|---|---|
| Republican | Mark Hilton (incumbent) | 12,193 | 66.70% |
| Democratic | Gary Lafone | 6,087 | 33.30% |
| Total votes | | 18,280 | 100% |
| Republican hold | | | |

=== 2008 ===
North Carolina House of Representatives 96th district general election, 2008
| Party | Candidate | Votes | % |
|---|---|---|---|
| Republican | Mark Hilton (incumbent) | 20,810 | 84.81% |
| Libertarian | Lawrence G. Hollar | 3,727 | 15.19% |
| Total votes | | 24,537 | 100% |
| Republican hold | | | |

=== 2006 ===
North Carolina House of Representatives 96th district general election, 2006
| Party | Candidate | Votes | % |
|---|---|---|---|
| Republican | Mark Hilton (incumbent) | 10,575 | 100% |
| Total votes | | 10,575 | 100% |
| Republican hold | | | |

=== 2004 ===
North Carolina House of Representatives 96th district general election, 2004
| Party | Candidate | Votes | % |
|---|---|---|---|
| Republican | Mark Hilton (incumbent) | 19,466 | 100% |
| Total votes | | 19,466 | 100% |
| Republican hold | | | |

=== 2002 ===
North Carolina House of Representatives 96th district general election, 2002
| Party | Candidate | Votes | % |
|---|---|---|---|
| Republican | Frank Mitchell (incumbent) | 9,822 | 58.16% |
| Democratic | Bill McMillan | 6,784 | 40.17% |
| Libertarian | Kyle Klock | 282 | 1.67% |
| Total votes | | 16,888 | 100% |
| Republican hold | | | |

=== 2000 ===
North Carolina House of Representatives 96th district Democratic primary election, 2000
| Party | Candidate | Votes | % |
|---|---|---|---|
| Democratic | Edd Nye (incumbent) | 4,435 | 49.69% |
| Democratic | Ron Taylor | 2,453 | 27.49% |
| Democratic | Donna Gooden Payne | 2,037 | 22.82% |
| Total votes | | 8,925 | 100% |

North Carolina House of Representatives 96th district general election, 2000
| Party | Candidate | Votes | % |
|---|---|---|---|
| Democratic | Edd Nye (incumbent) | 14,599 | 53.39% |
| Republican | Al Freimark | 12,743 | 46.61% |
| Total votes | | 27,342 | 100% |
| Democratic hold | | | |
