= Jay Adams (politician) =

American politician from North Carolina

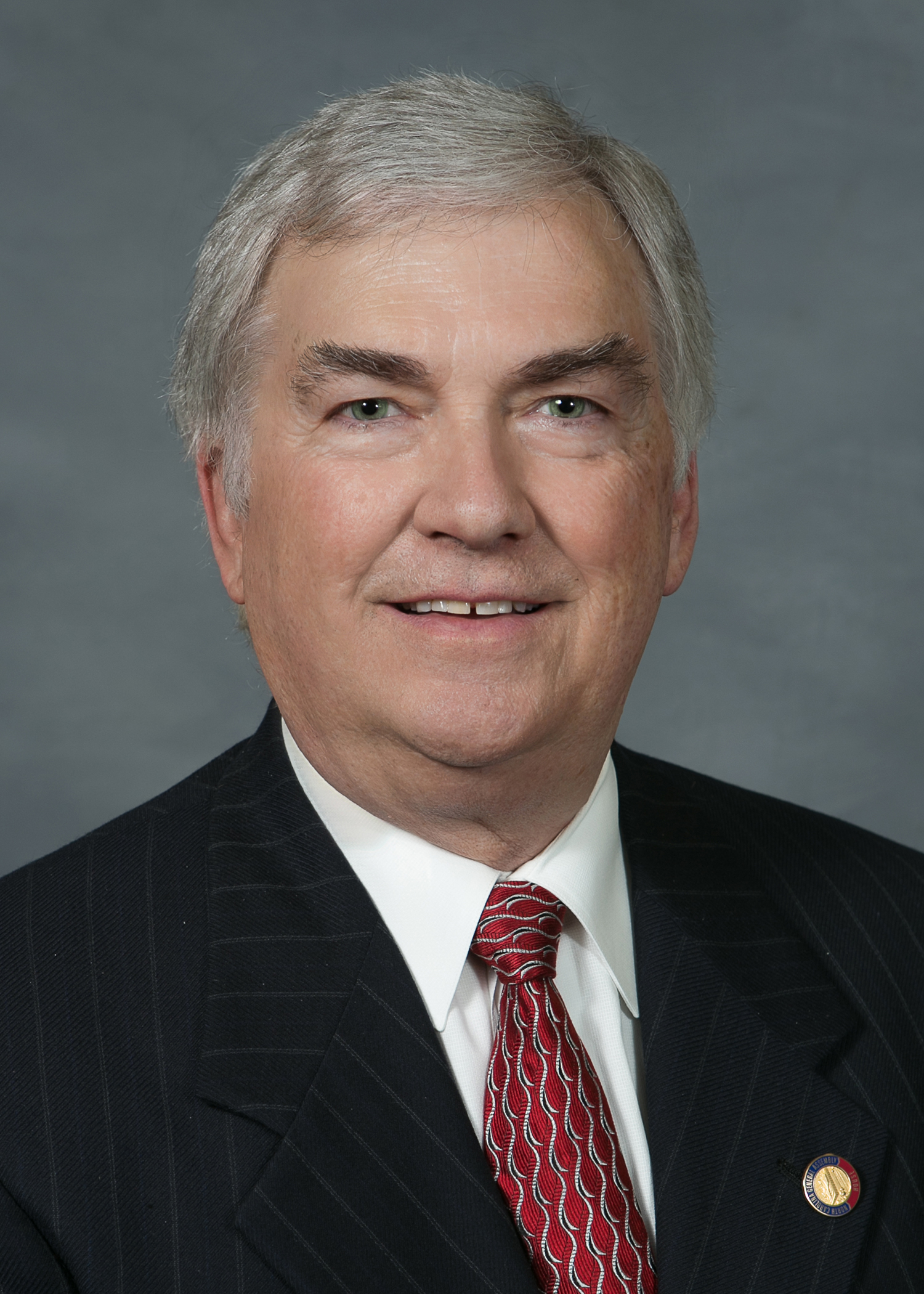

Member of the North Carolina House of Representatives from the 96th district
- Incumbent
- Assumed office January 1, 2015
- Preceded by: Andy Wells

Personal details
- Born: James Cecil Adams Jr. 1949 (age 76–77)
- Party: Republican
- Spouse: Donna
- Children: 2
- Education: The Citadel (BS)

James Cecil Adams, Jr. (born 1949) is a Republican member of the North Carolina House of Representatives. He has represented the 96th district (including constituents in Catawba County) since 2015.

== Life and career ==
Adams earned his Bachelor of Science in education from The Citadel. He studied mechanical drawing, computer science, and real estate at Catawba Valley Community College and earned his real estate license in 1983. He has lived in Hickory, North Carolina, since 1975.

== Electoral history ==
=== 2020 ===
North Carolina House of Representatives 96th district general election, 2020
Party	Candidate	Votes	%
Republican	Jay Adams (incumbent)	25,370	62.95%
Democratic	Kim Bost	14,929	37.05%
Total votes		40,299	100%
Republican hold			

=== 2018 ===
North Carolina House of Representatives 96th district Republican primary election, 2018
Party	Candidate	Votes	%
Republican	Jay Adams (incumbent)	6,013	69.69%
Republican	Taylor G. Huffman	2,615	30.31%
Total votes		8,628	100%

North Carolina House of Representatives 96th district general election, 2018
Party	Candidate	Votes	%
Republican	Jay Adams (incumbent)	16,285	60.74%
Democratic	Kim Bost	10,527	39.26%
Total votes		26,812	100%
Republican hold			

=== 2016 ===
North Carolina House of Representatives 96th district general election, 2016
Party	Candidate	Votes	%
Republican	Jay Adams (incumbent)	26,595	100%
Total votes		26,595	100%
Republican hold			

=== 2014 ===
North Carolina House of Representatives 96th district Republican primary election, 2014
Party	Candidate	Votes	%
Republican	Jay Adams	3,450	54.14%
Republican	Frank Willis	1,753	27.51%
Republican	Joe Fox	1,078	16.92%
Republican	Wrappar Kellett	91	1.43%
Total votes		6,372	100%

North Carolina House of Representatives 96th district general election, 2014
Party	Candidate	Votes	%
Republican	Jay Adams	14,771	67.24%
Democratic	Cliff Moone	7,196	32.76%
Total votes		21,967	100%
Republican hold			

== Committee assignments ==
=== 2021-2022 session ===
- Appropriations
- Appropriations - Education
- Wildlife Resources (Chair)
- Judiciary IV (Vice Chair)
- Commerce and Job Development
- Education - Community College
- Local Government - Land Use, Planning and Development
- Transportation

=== 2019-2020 session ===
- Appropriations
- Appropriations - Education
- Wildlife Resources (Chair)
- Judiciary
- Commerce and Job Development
- Education - Community Colleges
- Election Law and Campaign Finance Reform

=== 2017-2018 session ===
- Wildlife Resources (Chair)
- Environment (Vice Chair)
- Commerce and Job Development
- Elections and Ethics Law
- Finance
- Transportation
- State and Local Government II

=== 2015-2016 session ===
- Environment (Vice Chair)
- Wildlife Resources
- Commerce and Job Development
- Finance
- Judiciary IV
- Transportation
- Children, Youth and Families

North Carolina House of Representatives
Preceded by Andy Wells	Member of the North Carolina House of Representatives from the 96th district 2015-Present	Incumbent
