= W. Franklin Mitchell =

American politician

William Franklin "Frank" Mitchell is a Republican politician from North Carolina, USA.

A farmer and machine shop owner from Olin, he served six terms in the North Carolina General Assembly, representing North Carolina's ninety-sixth House district, including constituents in Iredell County. He lost the 2004 Republican primary to Julia Craven Howard after a hotly contested race.

== Recent electoral history ==
=== 2004 ===
North Carolina House of Representatives 79th district Republican primary election, 2004
Party	Candidate	Votes	%
Republican	Julia Craven Howard (incumbent)	3,929	53.07%
Republican	Frank Mitchell (incumbent)	3,474	46.93%
Total votes		7,403	100%

=== 2002 ===
North Carolina House of Representatives 96th district general election, 2002
Party	Candidate	Votes	%
Republican	Frank Mitchell (incumbent)	9,822	58.16%
Democratic	Bill McMillan	6,784	40.17%
Libertarian	Kyle Klock	282	1.67%
Total votes		16,888	100%
Republican hold			

=== 2000 ===
North Carolina House of Representatives 42nd district general election, 2000
Party	Candidate	Votes	%
Republican	Frank Mitchell (incumbent)	14,158	62.70%
Democratic	John Wayne Kahl	8,421	37.30%
Total votes		22,579	100%
Republican hold			

== See also ==
- Politics and government of North Carolina

North Carolina House of Representatives
Preceded by John Wayne Kahl	Member of the North Carolina House of Representatives from the 42nd district 1993–2003	Succeeded by Marvin Lucas
Preceded by Edd Nye	Member of the North Carolina House of Representatives from the 96th district 2003–2005	Succeeded by Mark Hilton
