= Andy Wells (American politician) =

American politician from North Carolina

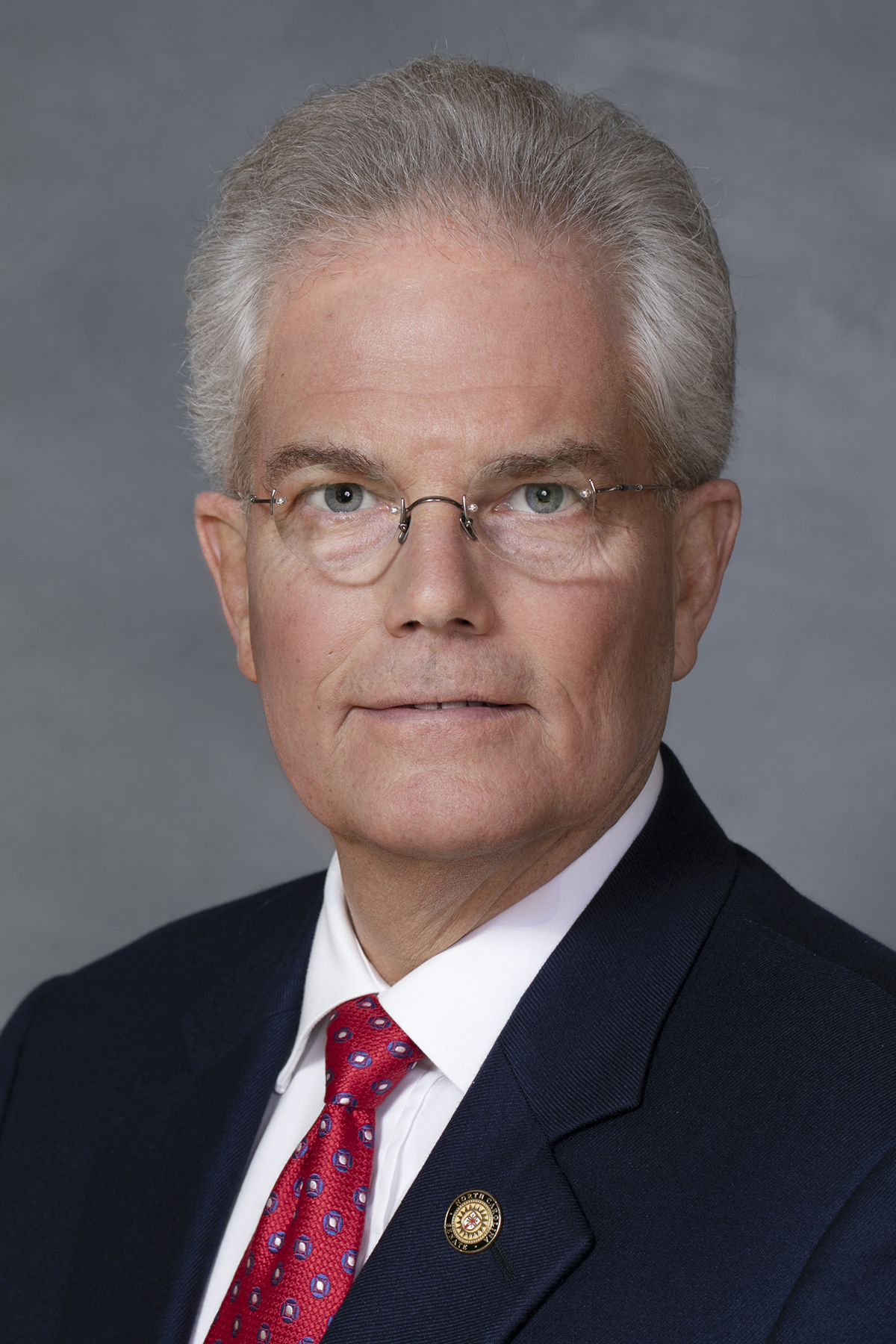
- Official portrait, 2019

Member of the North Carolina Senate from the 42nd district
- In office January 1, 2015 – July 27, 2020
- Preceded by: Austin Allran
- Succeeded by: Dean Proctor

Member of the North Carolina House of Representatives from the 96th district
- In office January 1, 2013 – January 1, 2015
- Preceded by: Mark Hilton
- Succeeded by: Jay Adams

Personal details
- Born: September 2, 1954 (age 72)
- Party: Republican
- Spouse: Suzanne Wells
- Education: North Carolina State University

Andy Wells (born September 2, 1954) is an American real estate developer and politician who served in the North Carolina House of Representatives from the 96th district from 2013 to 2015, and in the North Carolina Senate from the 42nd district from 2015 to 2020.

In 2020, Wells ran for Lieutenant Governor of North Carolina. He placed second in the March primary election, losing to eventual general election winner Mark Robinson. In June 2020, Wells resigned his seat in the North Carolina Senate to make himself "available for some other projects". In July 2023, Wells declared his candidacy for Governor of North Carolina in the 2024 North Carolina gubernatorial election, but failed to file for candidacy by the December 15th deadline.

== Electoral history ==
=== 2020 ===
Republican primary results
| Party | Candidate | Votes | % |
|---|---|---|---|
| Republican | Mark Robinson | 240,843 | 32.52% |
| Republican | Andy Wells | 107,824 | 14.56% |
| Republican | Mark Johnson | 89,200 | 12.04% |
| Republican | John L. Ritter | 85,023 | 11.48% |
| Republican | Renee Ellmers | 50,526 | 6.82% |
| Republican | Greg Gebhardt | 50,474 | 6.81% |
| Republican | Deborah Cochran | 48,234 | 6.51% |
| Republican | Scott Stone | 48,193 | 6.51% |
| Republican | Buddy Bengel | 20,395 | 2.75% |
| Total votes | | 740,712 | 100.00% |

=== 2018 ===
North Carolina Senate 42nd district Republican primary election, 2018
| Party | Candidate | Votes | % |
|---|---|---|---|
| Republican | Andy Wells (incumbent) | 9,018 | 47.46% |
| Republican | Mark Hollo | 6,506 | 34.24% |
| Republican | Ryan Huffman | 2,236 | 11.77% |
| Republican | Dustin Long | 1,241 | 6.53% |
| Total votes | | 19,001 | 100% |

North Carolina Senate 42nd district general election, 2018
| Party | Candidate | Votes | % |
|---|---|---|---|
| Republican | Andy Wells (incumbent) | 44,323 | 66.31% |
| Democratic | Ric Vandett | 22,522 | 33.69% |
| Total votes | | 66,845 | 100% |
| Republican hold | | | |

=== 2016 ===
North Carolina Senate 42nd district general election, 2016
| Party | Candidate | Votes | % |
|---|---|---|---|
| Republican | Andy Wells (incumbent) | 69,301 | 100% |
| Total votes | | 69,301 | 100% |
| Republican hold | | | |

=== 2014 ===
North Carolina Senate 42nd district general election, 2014
| Party | Candidate | Votes | % |
|---|---|---|---|
| Republican | Andy Wells | 31,869 | 59.49% |
| Democratic | Patrice "Pat" Hensley | 21,703 | 40.51% |
| Total votes | | 53,572 | 100% |
| Republican hold | | | |

=== 2012 ===
North Carolina House of Representatives 96th district general election, 2012
| Party | Candidate | Votes | % |
|---|---|---|---|
| Republican | Andy Wells | 21,073 | 62.46% |
| Democratic | Cliff Moone | 12,664 | 37.54% |
| Total votes | | 33,737 | 100% |
| Republican hold | | | |

North Carolina House of Representatives
| Preceded by Mark Hilton | Member of the North Carolina House of Representatives from the 96th district 2013–2015 | Succeeded by Jay Adams |
North Carolina Senate
| Preceded by Austin Allran | Member of the North Carolina Senate from the 42nd district 2015–2020 | Succeeded by Dean Proctor |
