= North Carolina's 42nd House district =

American legislative district

North Carolina's 42nd State House of Representatives district
Representative
Mike Colvin; D–Fayetteville
- Demographics: 31% White; 43% Black; 16% Hispanic; 2% Asian; 1% Other; 6% Multiracial
- Population (2024): 85,824

North Carolina's 42nd House district is one of 120 districts in the North Carolina House of Representatives. It has been represented by Democrat Mike Colvin since 2025.

== Geography ==
Since 2005, the district has included part of Cumberland County. The district overlaps with the 19th and 21st Senate districts.

== District officeholders ==
=== Multi-member district ===
Representative	Party	Dates	Notes	Representative	Party	Dates	Notes	Representative	Party	Dates	Notes	Counties
District created January 1, 1967.
Sam Ervin III (Morganton)	Democratic	January 1, 1967 – January 1, 1969	Redistricted from the Burke County district.	Earl Tate (Lenoir)	Democratic	January 1, 1967 – January 1, 1969	Redistricted from the Caldwell County district.	Donald Kincaid (Lenoir)	Republican	January 1, 1967 – January 1, 1973	Redistricted to the 34th district and retired to run for State Senate.	1967–1973; All of Burke, Caldwell, and Alexander counties.
William Fulton (Morganton)	Republican	January 1, 1969 – January 1, 1973	Redistricted to the 39th district.	Teral Thomas Bostian (Taylorsville)	Republican	January 1, 1969 – January 1, 1973		Donald Kincaid (Lenoir)	Republican	January 1, 1967 – January 1, 1973	Redistricted to the 34th district and retired to run for State Senate.	1967–1973; All of Burke, Caldwell, and Alexander counties.

=== Single-member district ===
Representative	Party	Dates	Notes	Counties
Fred Dorsey (Flat Rock)	Republican	January 1, 1973 – January 1, 1979		1973–1983; All of Henderson County.
Ralph Ledford (Hendersonville)	Republican	January 1, 1979 – January 1, 1981		1973–1983; All of Henderson County.
Charles Hughes (Hendersonville)	Republican	January 1, 1981 – January 1, 1983	Redistricted to the 50th district.	1973–1983; All of Henderson County.
J. P. Huskins (Statesville)	Democratic	January 1, 1983 – January 1, 1985	Redistricted from the 35th district.	1983–2003; Part of Iredell County.
Lois Walker (Statesville)	Republican	January 1, 1985 – January 1, 1991		1983–2003; Part of Iredell County.
John Wayne Kahl (Union Grove)	Democratic	January 1, 1991 – January 1, 1993	Lost re-election.	1983–2003; Part of Iredell County.
Frank Mitchell (Olin)	Republican	January 1, 1993 – January 1, 2003	Redistricted to the 96th district.	1983–2003; Part of Iredell County.
Marvin Lucas (Spring Lake)	Democratic	January 1, 2003 – January 1, 2025	Redistricted from the 17th district. Retired.	2003–2005; Parts of Cumberland and Harnett counties.
Marvin Lucas (Spring Lake)	Democratic	January 1, 2003 – January 1, 2025	Redistricted from the 17th district. Retired.	2005–Present; Part of Cumberland County.
Mike Colvin (Fayetteville)	Democratic	January 1, 2025 – Present		2005–Present; Part of Cumberland County.

== Election results ==
=== 2024 ===
North Carolina House of Representatives 42nd district Democratic primary election, 2024
Party	Candidate	Votes	%
Democratic	Mike Colvin	1,778	35.02%
Democratic	Naveed Aziz	1,471	28.97%
Democratic	Elmer Floyd	1,147	22.59%
Democratic	Courtney Banks-McLaughlin	681	13.41%
Total votes		5,077	100%

North Carolina House of Representatives 42nd district general election, 2024
Party	Candidate	Votes	%
Democratic	Mike Colvin	18,301	74.29%
Republican	Leonard Bryant	6,332	25.71%
Total votes		24,633	100%
Democratic hold			

=== 2022 ===
North Carolina House of Representatives 42nd district Democratic primary election, 2022
Party	Candidate	Votes	%
Democratic	Marvin Lucas (incumbent)	2,660	55.85%
Democratic	Naveed Aziz	2,103	44.15%
Total votes		4,763	100%

North Carolina House of Representatives 42nd district general election, 2022
Party	Candidate	Votes	%
Democratic	Marvin Lucas (incumbent)	10,563	71.27%
Republican	Gloria Carrasco	4,258	28.73%
Total votes		14,821	100%
Democratic hold			

=== 2020 ===
North Carolina House of Representatives 42nd district general election, 2020
Party	Candidate	Votes	%
Democratic	Marvin Lucas (incumbent)	19,024	67.39%
Republican	Jon Blake	9,206	32.61%
Total votes		28,230	100%
Democratic hold			

=== 2018 ===
North Carolina House of Representatives 42nd district general election, 2018
Party	Candidate	Votes	%
Democratic	Marvin Lucas (incumbent)	13,100	76.05%
Republican	Ed Williams	3,684	21.39%
Constitution	Mark A. Crowe	442	2.57%
Total votes		17,226	100%
Democratic hold			

=== 2016 ===
North Carolina House of Representatives 42nd district general election, 2016
Party	Candidate	Votes	%
Democratic	Marvin Lucas (incumbent)	24,213	100%
Total votes		24,213	100%
Democratic hold			

=== 2014 ===
North Carolina House of Representatives 42nd district general election, 2014
Party	Candidate	Votes	%
Democratic	Marvin Lucas (incumbent)	13,708	100%
Total votes		13,708	100%
Democratic hold			

=== 2012 ===
North Carolina House of Representatives 42nd district general election, 2012
Party	Candidate	Votes	%
Democratic	Marvin Lucas (incumbent)	23,240	77.45%
Republican	Frank Racz	6,766	22.55%
Total votes		30,006	100%
Democratic hold			

=== 2010 ===
North Carolina House of Representatives 42nd district general election, 2010
Party	Candidate	Votes	%
Democratic	Marvin Lucas (incumbent)	8,874	100%
Total votes		8,874	100%
Democratic hold			

=== 2008 ===
North Carolina House of Representatives 42nd district general election, 2008
Party	Candidate	Votes	%
Democratic	Marvin Lucas (incumbent)	19,137	100%
Total votes		19,137	100%
Democratic hold			

=== 2006 ===
North Carolina House of Representatives 42nd district general election, 2006
Party	Candidate	Votes	%
Democratic	Marvin Lucas (incumbent)	5,610	100%
Total votes		5,610	100%
Democratic hold			

=== 2004 ===
North Carolina House of Representatives 42nd district general election, 2004
Party	Candidate	Votes	%
Democratic	Marvin Lucas (incumbent)	10,746	66.24%
Republican	Bob White	5,476	33.76%
Total votes		16,222	100%
Democratic hold			

=== 2002 ===
North Carolina House of Representatives 42nd district general election, 2002
Party	Candidate	Votes	%
Democratic	Marvin Lucas (incumbent)	6,845	100%
Total votes		6,845	100%
Democratic hold			

=== 2000 ===
North Carolina House of Representatives 42nd district general election, 2000
Party	Candidate	Votes	%
Republican	Frank Mitchell (incumbent)	14,158	62.70%
Democratic	John Wayne Kahl	8,421	37.30%
Total votes		22,579	100%
Republican hold			
