= Rob Bryan =

American politician (born 1971)

Member of the North Carolina Senate from the 39th district
- In office October 2, 2019 – January 1, 2021
- Preceded by: Dan Bishop
- Succeeded by: DeAndrea Salvador

Member of the North Carolina House of Representatives from the 88th district
- In office January 1, 2013 – January 1, 2017
- Preceded by: Martha Alexander (Redistricting)
- Succeeded by: Mary Belk

Personal details
- Born: Robert P. Bryan III; June 4, 1971 (age 55) Raleigh, North Carolina, U.S.
- Party: Republican
- Spouse: Dottie Bryan
- Education: University of North Carolina at Chapel Hill (BA); Duke University (JD)
- Website: General Assembly website Campaign website

Robert P. Bryan III (born June 4, 1971) is an American politician, attorney, and former member of the North Carolina Senate for the 39th district. A Republican, he served as a member of the North Carolina House of Representatives from Mecklenburg County from 2013, when he defeated long-time Democratic incumbent Martha Alexander, until 2016, when he was defeated by Democratic candidate Mary Gardner Belk. After leaving the House, Bryan accepted an appointment to the University of North Carolina Board of Governors.

After Dan Bishop's successful run for the 9th congressional district in a special election, Bryan was selected by Mecklenburg County Republican Party leaders to complete the remainder of Bishop's term in the North Carolina Senate. Bryan began service on the University of North Carolina Board of Trustees on July 1, 2021.

== Early life and education ==
Bryan was born in Raleigh, North Carolina, the son of Robert P. Bryan, Jr., an engineer, and Anita Rutland Bryan, a public school teacher. He was the oldest child with one younger sister, Melissa Bryan Kruger, author of The Envy of Eve: Finding Contentment in a Covetous World and Walking with God in the Season of Motherhood.

In 1989, after graduating from Sanderson High School, Bryan attended the University of North Carolina at Chapel Hill where he earned a B.A. in History with distinction in 1993. While attending UNC, Bryan was inducted into the Phi Eta Sigma honor society and was in the Lambda Chi Alpha fraternity, where he served as an officer. He also served as President of InterVarsity Christian Fellowship and was involved in student government.

After graduating with distinction in 1993, Bryan applied for, and was accepted into, the fourth corps of Teach For America, as part of the effort to "grow and strengthen the movement for educational equity and excellence." Bryan spent the next two years teaching second and third grade in a bilingual classroom at Abbott Elementary School in Lynwood, California. During the summer between his two years teaching, Bryan was the first intern at the Center for Education Reform in Washington, D.C.

Following his time teaching, Bryan returned to North Carolina and enrolled at the Duke University School of Law, where he graduated with honors in 1998. During the summer of 1997, Bryan served as a summer associate at the firm of O'Melveny & Myers, LLP in Los Angeles, California. Additionally, he spent a semester abroad at Pontifical Catholic University of Chile in Santiago, Chile.

== Career ==
Bryan was admitted to the North Carolina State Bar in 1998 and began work as an associate at the Charlotte office of K&L Gates. He later served as special counsel in the Charlotte office of Parker Poe Adams & Bernstein. In 2006, Bryan joined the Charlotte office of Womble Bond Dickinson, the largest law firm in North Carolina. At Womble Carlyle, Bryan was a partner in the Real Estate Development Practice Group and served as a member of the firm's recruiting committee.

Bryan has received numerous awards for his legal work including being awarded the Business Leaders Magazine's "Movers and Shakers" award in 2008, being named to Charlotte Business Journal 's "40 under 40" list in 2009, and being named a North Carolina Super Lawyers ' "Rising Star" from 2009-2011.

In addition to his work for the firm, Bryan has maintained an active local profile in both political and civic service. He served as treasurer of Ruth Samuelson's campaign for Mecklenburg County Commissioner in 2000. He was also a member of the Mecklenburg County Republican Party's Executive Committee in 2003, and Chairman of the Mecklenburg County Republican Party from 2009 to 2011. Bryan's serving as Vice Chairman of El Centro Hispano from 2002 to 2004, President of the Christian Legal Society of Charlotte from 2006 to 2012, Chairman of the Board of Directors of the Pregnancy Resource Center of Charlotte from 2006 to 2012, and as an Elder of the Uptown Church from 2001 to 2004.

=== North Carolina House of Representatives ===
==== Electoral history ====
NC House of Representatives General Election
Year	Democratic	Votes	Pct	Republican	Votes	Pct
2012	Martha Alexander	18,106	45.1%	Rob Bryan	22,081	54.9%
2014	Margie Storch	11,805	44.6%	Rob Bryan	14,644	55.4%
2016	Mary Belk	21,620	50.6%	Rob Bryan	21,095	49.4%

In 2012, Bryan was first elected to the North Carolina General Assembly as a Representative from House District 88, which covers approximately 75,000 residents in Mecklenburg County's south Charlotte area. In the 2012 election, Bryan ran unopposed in the Republican primary and easily defeated twenty-year incumbent and former Minority Whip, Martha B. Alexander, earning close to fifty-five percent of the vote in the general election. Bryan was reelected in 2014 running unopposed in the primary and defeating challenger Margie Storch. In 2016, Bryan was defeated by Democratic challenger Mary Gardner Belk in the general election after both were unopposed in their respective primaries.

==== Committee service ====
For the 2015–2016 session of the NCGA, Bryan was a member of the following committees:

- Standing or Select Committees
  - Appropriations (Vice-Chairman)
  - Appropriations, Education (Chairman)
  - Judiciary IV (Chairman)
  - House Select Committee on Achievement School Districts (Chairman)
  - Banking
  - Commerce and Job Development
  - Education; K-12
  - Elections
  - House Select Committee on Education Strategy and Practices
  - Regulatory Reform
  - University Board of Governors Nominating
- Non-Standing Committees
  - Joint Legislative Education Oversight Committee (Chairman)
  - Legislative Ethics Committee (Chairman)
  - Joint Legislative Workforce Development System Reform Oversight Committee (Chairman)
  - Joint Legislative Administrative Procedure Oversight Committee
  - North Carolina General Statutes Commission
  - Committee on Homeless Youth, Foster Care and Dependency (LRC)(2015)
  - Joint Legislative Oversight Committee on the North Carolina State Lottery

==== Notable legislation ====
During the 2015-2016 session of the NCGA, Bryan was the sponsor or co-sponsor of eighty-two pieces of legislation. Among the most notable of his legislative priorities during his first two session were legislation to create the Opportunity Scholarship Program and separate legislation to create the Achievement School District in North Carolina.

Despite having been defeated in the November 8, 2016 election by Mary Belk, on December 14, 2016, during a special session of the General Assembly called by Republican members, Bryan sponsored the controversial House Bill 17, which limits the power of the newly elected Democratic Governor Roy Cooper.

===== Legislative history =====
In March 2013, during Bryan's first term at the General Assembly, he, along with three other primary sponsors, introduced House Bill 944. As originally proposed, the legislation would have appropriated $40 million in its first year to create the Opportunity Scholarship Program in North Carolina. The Program was designed to expand school choice for eligible children in kindergarten through 12th grade by providing awards of up to $4200 each year to cover the cost of tuition and fees at any participating nonpublic school. Eligibility for the program is based largely on household income.

After being referred to, and receiving a favorable report from, the House Committee on Education HB 944 was referred to the House Appropriations Committee for further consideration. Rather than considering the legislation as a stand-alone measure, the bill was instead included as part of the State's biennial budget and passed in substantially the same form as it was introduced in July 2013.

===== Legal challenges =====
In late 2013, a pair of legal challenges were filed in North Carolina State courts challenging the validity of the Opportunity Scholarship Program under various provisions of the North Carolina Constitution. The challenges, brought by the North Carolina School Boards Association, the North Carolina Association of Educators, and the North Carolina Justice Center, were consolidated for action in Wake County Superior Court where Judge Robert Hobgood ultimately upheld the challenge and ruled that the Program was violative of the State Constitution. Hobgood issued a permanent injunction prohibiting any more tax funds from being disbursed for vouchers.

The Supreme Court of North Carolina agreed to hear an appeal prior to a resolution from the NC Court of Appeals and, in July 2015, overturned Judge Hobgood's order in a 4-3 decision. The majority of the State Supreme Court found the Program to be constitutional and ordered the scholarships to be continued.

===== Program participation =====
During the Program's three years, the scholarships have been widely sought after and the Program continues to grow. During the 2014-2015 school year, the North Carolina State Education Assistance Authority received applications from over 4200 eligible students and awarded scholarships to more than 1200 students totalling more than $4.6 million. In 2015-2016, the number of new eligible applicants increased to over 6100 and the SEAA awarded nearly $13 million in scholarships to 6100 students.

===== Achievement School District =====
In May 2016, Bryan, along with two other primary sponsors, introduced House Bill 1080 with the goal of creating North Carolina's Achievement School District (ASD). With bipartisan support, ASD was proposed to alleviate the problem of recurring student underachievement in low-performing elementary schools throughout North Carolina. HB 1080 was created to allow for five of the lowest-performing schools in the state to be selected and coupled together to form a statewide school district (the Achievement School District). The Achievement School District would be led by a school operator under a five-year performance contract, and chosen from a committee headed by the Lieutenant Governor and the ASD's new Superintendent.

The NC House of Representatives passed HB 1080 on June 2, 2016. Weeks later on June 28, 2016, the NC Senate amended and passed Bryan's ASD bill. Because of the amendments that the Senate included in ASD, HB 1080 was sent back to the NC House of Representatives for concurrence, where it was favorably passed on June 29, 2016.

=== Awards and recognition ===
As a member of the NCGA, Bryan was recognized as the YMCA Mission Forward Legislator of the Year for 2015 and by the North Carolina Public Charter School Association as a "Charter Champion." He has additionally been appointed to the University of North Carolina at Chapel Hill Board of Visitors.

== Personal life ==
Bryan lives in south Charlotte with his wife, Dorothy Hanks "Dottie" Bryan, and their six children.

North Carolina House of Representatives
Preceded by Mark Hollo	Member of the North Carolina House of Representatives from the 88th district 2013-2017	Succeeded by Mark Belk
North Carolina Senate
Preceded by Dan Bishop	Member of the North Carolina Senate from the 39th district 2019-2021	Succeeded by DeAndrea Salvador
