= Mary Gardner Belk =

American politician

Mary Belk
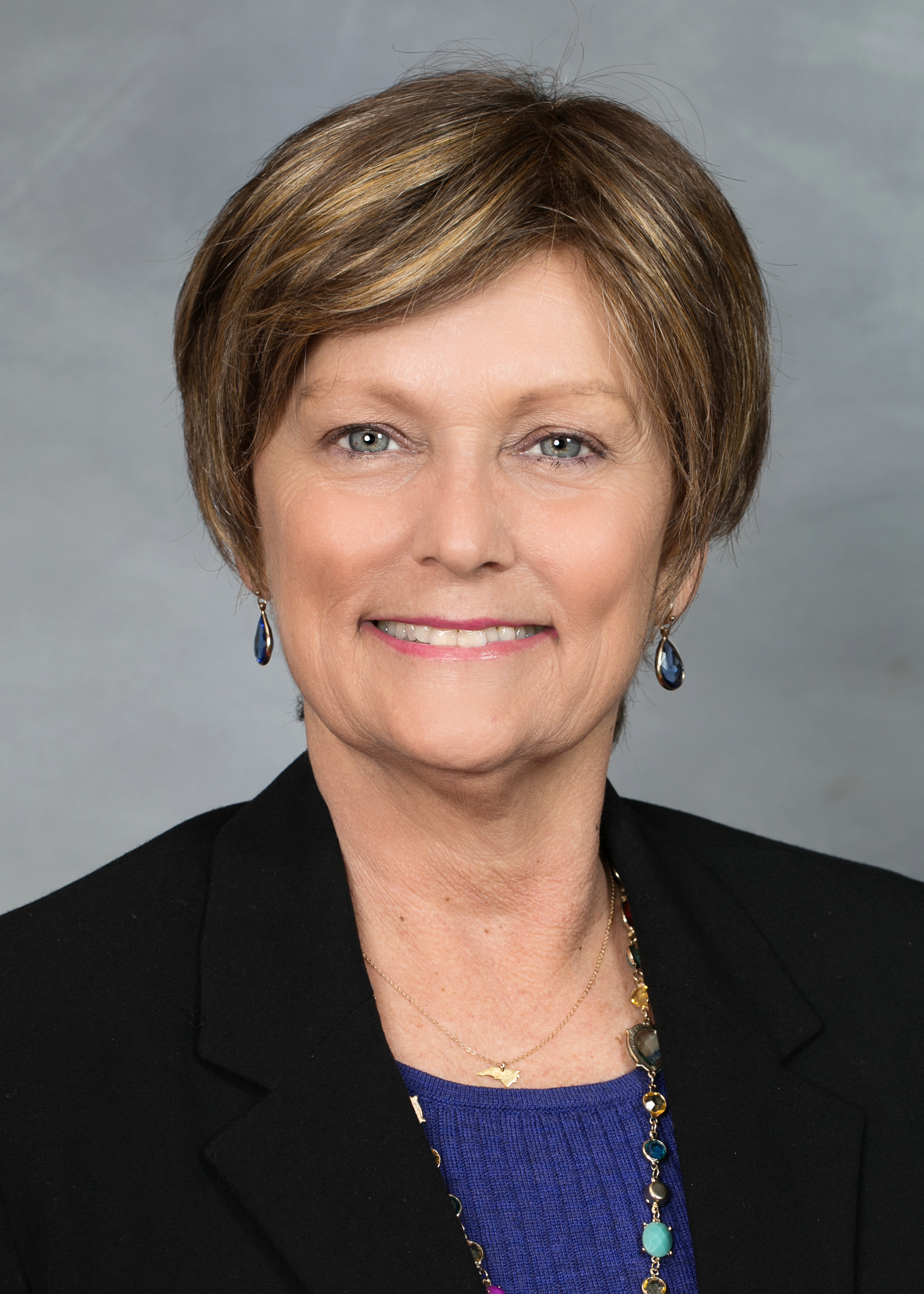

Member of the North Carolina House of Representatives from the 88th district
- Incumbent
- Assumed office January 1, 2017
- Preceded by: Rob Bryan

Personal details
- Born: Mary Denise Gardner; October 5, 1956 (age 70) Washington, D.C., U.S.
- Party: Democratic
- Spouse: Ralph Belk Jr.
- Education: University of North Carolina, Charlotte (BA)
- Profession: Property Management
- Website: Campaign website

Mary Gardner Belk (born October 5, 1956) is a Democratic member of the North Carolina General Assembly representing the state's 88th House district, which includes portions of Southeast Mecklenburg County. 2017 was her first year in North Carolina House. In the 2017–2018 session, Belk served on the Transportation, Banking, and Justice and Public Safety Appropriations Committees. She's a member of the Progressive House Caucus.

== Personal life ==
=== Family ===
Representative Belk lives in Charlotte, North Carolina. She and her husband, Ralph Belk, Jr., have four adult children. Her oldest son, Ralph Belk III, serves as her legislative assistant.

=== Education ===
Belk graduated from Garinger High School in 1974 and studied police science before dedicating time to raising her children. She later returned to the University of North Carolina at Charlotte and earned her BA in political science, graduating with honors in 2006.

=== Public service ===
Before seeking elective office, Belk served on a number of community Boards, including the Dilworth Community Development Association, the Charlotte Catholic Foundation, the St. Patrick's Church Council, and the Democratic Women of Mecklenburg County.

=== Cancer diagnosis ===
In September 2016, during her first campaign, Belk was diagnosed with breast cancer and underwent surgery to immediately begin treatment. A positive prognosis allowed her to postpone chemotherapy until two days after the 2016 election, and she underwent radiation treatments during her first months serving in the General Assembly. Her office announced that she completed her final radiation treatment on May 18, 2017.

== North Carolina House of Representatives ==
=== Committee assignments ===
==== 2021-2022 Session ====
- Appropriations
- Appropriations - Transportation
- Judiciary IV
- Regulatory Reform
- Transportation

==== 2019-2020 session ====
- Appropriations
- Appropriations - Health and Human Services
- Judiciary IV
- Regulatory Reform
- Transportation

==== 2017-2018 session ====
- Appropriations
- Appropriations - Justice and Public Safety
- Judiciary IV
- Transportation
- Banking
- State and Local Government I

=== Electoral history ===
==== 2020 ====
North Carolina House of Representatives 88th district general election, 2020
Party	Candidate	Votes	%
Democratic	Mary Belk (incumbent)	31,647	63.11%
Republican	David Tondreau	18,497	36.89%
Total votes		50,144	100%
Democratic hold			

==== 2018 ====
North Carolina House of Representatives 88th district general election, 2018
Party	Candidate	Votes	%
Democratic	Mary Belk (incumbent)	22,561	75.63%
Republican	Ty Turner	7,268	24.37%
Total votes		29,829	100%
Democratic hold			

==== 2016 ====
North Carolina House of Representatives 88th district general election, 2016
Party	Candidate	Votes	%
Democratic	Mary Belk	21,754	50.54%
Republican	Rob Bryan (incumbent)	21,286	49.46%
Total votes		43,040	100%
Democratic gain from Republican			

North Carolina House of Representatives
Preceded by Rob Bryan	Member of the North Carolina House of Representatives from the 88th district 2017-Present	Incumbent
