= Woodson Bradley =

American politician (born 1973)

- Official portrait, 2025

Member of the North Carolina Senate from the 42nd district
- Incumbent
- Assumed office January 1, 2025
- Preceded by: Rachel Hunt

Personal details
- Born: February 5, 1973 (age 53)
- Party: Democratic
- Education: Hollins University
- Website: woodsonbradley.com

Woodson Bradley (born February 5, 1973) is an American politician serving as a member of the North Carolina State Senate since 2025 representing the 42nd district. She is a member of the Democratic Party.

== Early life and education ==
Woodson Bradley was born on February 5, 1973. Her mother is a school teacher and her father worked in law enforcement.

Bradley earned a bachelor's degree in economics with a concentration in Business Administration from Hollins University. After graduation, she taught abroad for one year.

== Career ==
=== Business ===
Bradley worked as a residential real estate broker. In 2008, Forbes listed Bradley among the "Most Dependable Real Estate Professionals of the Eastern United States." She was working as a realtor as of 2024.

From 2010 to 2013, Bradley worked in sales as an independent contractor of Fortune Hi-Tech Marketing.

=== North Carolina Senate ===
During the 2024 North Carolina Senate election, Bradley ran as the Democratic candidate for the 42nd district. Her campaign addressed issues such as abortion rights, public education, the cost of living, and public safety. She opposed North Carolina's abortion ban after 12 weeks and expressed support for restoring protections aligned with Roe v. Wade. Bradley's opponent in the race was Stacie McGinn, a Republican and former attorney for the North Carolina Republican Party. The seat, covering parts of Mecklenburg County, was previously held by Rachel Hunt, a Democrat running in the lieutenant gubernatorial election. Mecklenburg County certified the final vote counts on November 15, showing Bradley leading McGinn by 204 votes out of 124,334 cast, a margin of 0.16 percent. McGinn requested a recount but conceded after a second State Board of Elections protest hearing on December 20 upheld Bradley's final lead of 209 votes.

On November 4, 2026, Bradley was re-elected to represent District 42 in the North Carolina Senate.

==== Committee Assignments, 2025-2026 session ====
- Education/Higher Education
- Pensions and Retirement and Aging
- Appropriations on General Government and Information Technology
- Regulatory Reform

== Personal life ==
Bradley is a survivor of domestic violence and sexual assault. Her experiences as a struggling single mother inspired her run for senate and focus on issues such as abortion rights, the cost of living, and public safety.

Bradley has been involved in community organizations, including Safe Alliance, the Rotary Club of Charlotte, and the Mecklenburg County Domestic Violence Speakers Bureau. She has volunteered for the Special Olympics of North Carolina, Charlotte Rescue Mission, and Classroom Central.

== Electoral history ==
North Carolina Senate 42nd district general election, 2024
Party	Candidate	Votes	%
Democratic	Woodson Bradley	62,260	50.08%
Republican	Stacie McGinn	62,051	49.92%
Total votes		124,311	100%
Democratic hold			
