= T. Raymond Warren =

American politician

Representative Ray Warren

Member of the North Carolina House of Representatives from the 88th district
- In office January 1, 2007 – January 1, 2011
- Preceded by: Mark Hollo
- Succeeded by: Mark Hollo

Sheriff of Alexander County
- In office 1990–2002
- Preceded by: Thomas Bebber Jr.
- Succeeded by: Hayden Bentley

Personal details
- Born: Thomas Raymond Warren
- Party: Democratic
- Spouse: Iran

Thomas Raymond Warren -- more commonly known as Ray Warren -- is a former member of the North Carolina House of Representatives, who represented the state's 88th district (including all of Alexander County and part of Catawba County). He was first elected in November 2006 defeating incumbent Republican Mark Hollo, and he served from 2007 until 2011.

Warren is the former sheriff of Alexander County, North Carolina and is a veteran of the United States Army. Warren is a member of the Order of the Long Leaf Pine.

Note that another, unrelated "Ray Warren" (Raymond A. Warren) was also a member of the N.C. House of Representatives, served as a state superior court judge, and ran unsuccessfully for Congress.

== Career ==
Warren served in the U.S Army from 1966 to 1968. in 1978, he was appointed as a Magistrate in Alexander County. In 1979, he began working for the Alexander County Sheriff's Office, where he was appointed an investigator in 1980 and Chief Deputy in 1987. In 1990, he was elected Sheriff of Alexander County, succeeding long time incumbent Thomas Bebber Jr. He was re-elected in 1994 and 1998. In 2002, he didn't seek re-election was sheriff and instead ran for the North Carolina House of Representatives. He was defeated in the general election by incumbent Republican Edgar Starnes. In 2006, he ran for the NC House again and defeated incumbent Republican Mark Hollo, he went on to defeat Hollo in a rematch in the 2008 election. Warren did not seek re-election to the NC House in 2010 and he was succeeded by his predecessor, Mark Hollo.

== Electoral history ==
=== 2008 ===
North Carolina House of Representatives 88th district general election, 2008
Party	Candidate	Votes	%
Democratic	Ray Warren (incumbent)	15,729	50.33%
Republican	Mark Hollo	15,520	49.67%
Total votes		31,249	100%
Democratic hold			

=== 2006 ===
North Carolina House of Representatives 88th district general election, 2006
Party	Candidate	Votes	%
Democratic	Ray Warren	9,650	52.61%
Republican	Mark Hollo (incumbent)	8,693	47.39%
Total votes		18,343	100%
Democratic gain from Republican			

=== 2002 ===
North Carolina House of Representatives 87th district general election, 2002
Party	Candidate	Votes	%
Republican	Edgar Starnes (incumbent)	11,813	51.48%
Democratic	Ray Warren	11,132	48.52%
Total votes		22,945	100%
Republican hold			

North Carolina House of Representatives
Preceded by Mark Hollo	Member of the North Carolina House of Representatives from the 88th district 2007-2011	Succeeded by Mark Hollo
