= Mike Colvin =

American politician

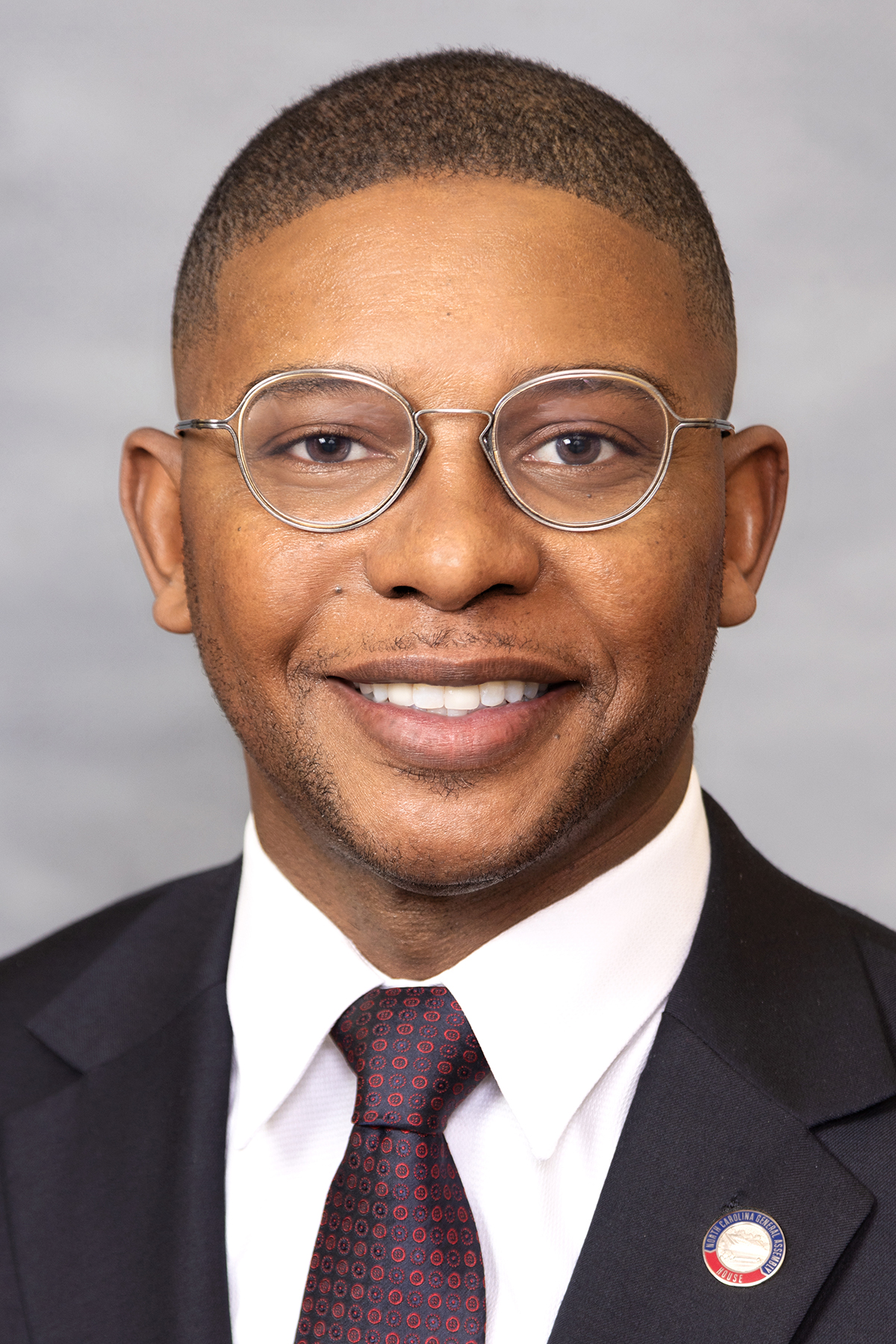

Member of the North Carolina House of Representatives from the 42nd district
- Incumbent
- Assumed office January 1, 2025
- Preceded by: Marvin W. Lucas

Personal details
- Party: Democratic
- Website: votemikecolvin.com

Mike Colvin is a Democratic member of the North Carolina House of Representatives. He has represented the 42nd district since 2025.
