= Mark K. Hilton =

American politician

Mark Hilton

Member of the North Carolina House of Representatives
- In office January 24, 2001 – January 9, 2013
- Preceded by: Cherie Berry
- Succeeded by: Andy Wells
- Constituency: 45th District (2001-2003); 88th District (2003-2005); 96th District (2005-2013)

Personal details
- Born: April 18, 1966 (age 60) Valdese, North Carolina, U.S.
- Party: Republican
- Spouse: Allison Towe Hilton
- Children: 3
- Education: St. Stephens High School, Western Piedmont Community College
- Occupation: NC Alcohol Beverage Control and a reserve officer for the Town of Catawba
- Profession: Police Officer
- NC General Assembly 2012 ProfileProject Vote Smart

Mark Kelly Hilton was a Republican member of the North Carolina General Assembly representing the state's ninety-sixth House district, including constituents in Catawba county. A police officer from Conover, North Carolina, Hilton served six terms in the state House.

A Catawba County native he began work with the NC Alcohol Beverage Commission as a Permit Compliance Officer in August 2013.

== Electoral history ==
=== 2010 ===
North Carolina House of Representatives 96th district general election, 2010
Party	Candidate	Votes	%
Republican	Mark Hilton (incumbent)	12,193	66.70%
Democratic	Gary Lafone	6,087	33.30%
Total votes		18,280	100%
Republican hold			

=== 2008 ===
North Carolina House of Representatives 96th district general election, 2008
Party	Candidate	Votes	%
Republican	Mark Hilton (incumbent)	20,810	84.81%
Libertarian	Lawrence G. Hollar	3,727	15.19%
Total votes		24,537	100%
Republican hold			

=== 2006 ===
North Carolina House of Representatives 96th district general election, 2006
Party	Candidate	Votes	%
Republican	Mark Hilton (incumbent)	10,575	100%
Total votes		10,575	100%
Republican hold			

=== 2004 ===
North Carolina House of Representatives 96th district general election, 2004
Party	Candidate	Votes	%
Republican	Mark Hilton (incumbent)	19,466	100%
Total votes		19,466	100%
Republican hold			

=== 2002 ===
North Carolina House of Representatives 88th district Republican primary election, 2002
Party	Candidate	Votes	%
Republican	Mark Hilton (incumbent)	2,795	57.70%
Republican	T. Hamilton Ward	2,049	42.30%
Total votes		4,844	100%

North Carolina House of Representatives 88th district general election, 2002
Party	Candidate	Votes	%
Republican	Mark Hilton (incumbent)	12,549	100%
Total votes		12,549	100%
Republican hold			

=== 2000 ===
North Carolina House of Representatives 45th district Republican primary election, 2000
Party	Candidate	Votes	%
Republican	Joe Kiser (incumbent)	4,467	41.42%
Republican	Mark Hilton	3,597	33.35%
Republican	Ray Hoyle	2,722	25.24%
Total votes		10,786	100%

North Carolina House of Representatives 45th district general election, 2000
Party	Candidate	Votes	%
Republican	Joe Kiser (incumbent)	30,639	32.75%
Republican	Mark Hilton	29,812	31.87%
Democratic	David Clark Jr.	19,419	20.76%
Democratic	Columbus J. Turner	13,679	14.62%
Total votes		93,549	100%
Republican hold			
Republican hold			

North Carolina House of Representatives
Preceded by Cherie Berry	Member of the North Carolina House of Representatives from the 45th District; 2001–2003; Served alongside: Joe Kiser	Succeeded by Alex Warner
Preceded by Theresa Esposito	Member of the North Carolina House of Representatives from the 88th District; 2003–2005	Succeeded by Mark Hollo
Preceded by Frank Mitchell	Member of the North Carolina House of Representatives from the 96th District; 2005–2013	Succeeded by Andy Wells
