= Marvin W. Lucas =

American politician (born 1941)

Marvin Lucas
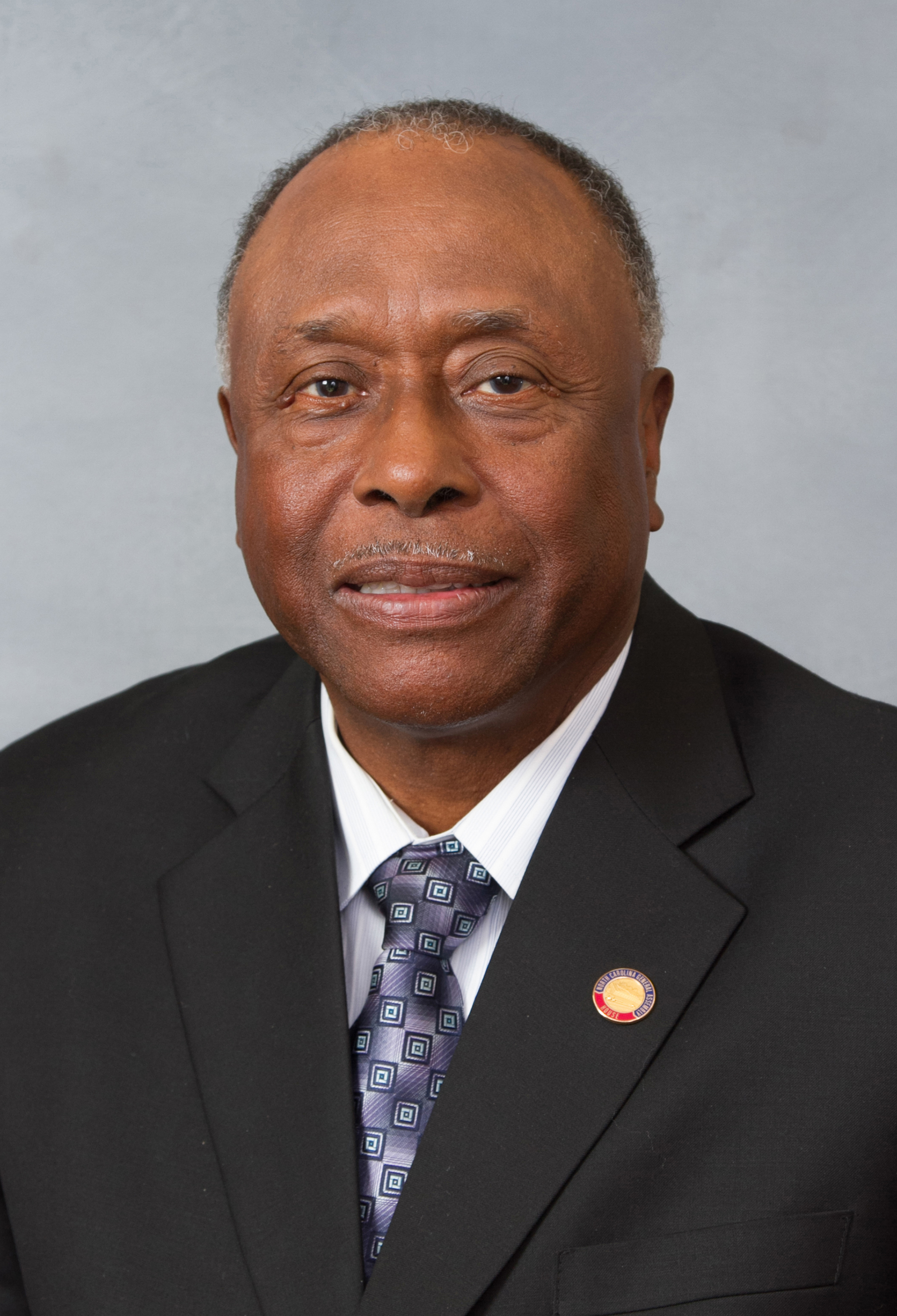

Member of the North Carolina House of Representatives
- In office January 1, 2001 – January 1, 2025
- Preceded by: Theodore James Kinney
- Succeeded by: Mike Colvin
- Constituency: 17th District (2001–2003); 42nd District (2003–2025)

Personal details
- Born: Marvin Willis Lucas Jr. November 15, 1941 (age 84) Spring Lake, North Carolina, U.S.
- Party: Democratic
- Spouse: Brenda
- Education: Fayetteville State University (BS); North Carolina Central University (MA); East Carolina University (EdS)
- Profession: Educator, principal

Marvin Willis Lucas Jr. (born November 15, 1941) is a Democratic former member of the North Carolina House of Representatives, who represented the 17th and later 42nd districts from 2001 until 2025. His district includes constituents in Cumberland County. He serves as the House Democratic Conference Co-Chair. Lucas is a retired school principal from Spring Lake, North Carolina. Lucas is African-American.

== Committee assignments ==
=== 2023–2024 session ===
- Appropriations
- Appropriations - Education
- Insurance (Vice Chair)
- Alcoholic Beverage Control
- Education - K-12
- Health
- Military and Veterans Affairs
- Wildlife Resources

=== 2021–2022 session ===
- Appropriations
- Appropriations - Education
- Insurance (Vice Chair)
- Education - K-12
- Health
- Wildlife Resources

=== 2019–2020 session ===
- Appropriations
- Appropriations - Education
- Insurance (Vice Chair)
- Education - K-12
- Health
- Wildlife Resources
- Alcoholic Beverage Control

=== 2017–2018 session ===
- Appropriations
- Appropriations - Education
- Insurance
- Wildlife Resources
- Alcoholic Beverage Control
- Banking
- Health
- Homeland Security, Military, and Veterans Affairs
- University Board of Governors Nominating

=== 2015–2016 session ===
- Appropriations
- Appropriations - Education
- Agriculture (Vice Chair)
- Alcoholic Beverage Control (Vice Chair)
- Insurance
- Wildlife Resources
- Health
- Homeland Security, Military, and Veterans Affairs

=== 2013–2014 session ===
- Appropriations
- Education (Vice Chair)
- Agriculture
- Commerce and Job Development
- Public Utilities

=== 2011–2012 session ===
- Appropriations
- Education (Vice Chair)
- Commerce and Job Development
- Public Utilities
- Ethics

=== 2009–2010 session ===
- Appropriations
- Education
- Alcoholic Beverage Control
- Wildlife Resources
- Public Utilities
- Ethics
- Local Government II

== Electoral history ==
=== 2022 ===
North Carolina House of Representatives 42nd district Democratic primary election, 2022
Party	Candidate	Votes	%
Democratic	Marvin Lucas (incumbent)	2,660	55.85%
Democratic	Naveed Aziz	2,103	44.15%
Total votes		4,763	100%

North Carolina House of Representatives 42nd district general election, 2022
Party	Candidate	Votes	%
Democratic	Marvin Lucas (incumbent)	10,563	71.27%
Republican	Gloria Carrasco	4,258	28.73%
Total votes		14,821	100%
Democratic hold			

=== 2020 ===
North Carolina House of Representatives 42nd district general election, 2020
Party	Candidate	Votes	%
Democratic	Marvin Lucas (incumbent)	19,024	67.39%
Republican	Jon Blake	9,206	32.61%
Total votes		28,230	100%
Democratic hold			

=== 2018 ===
North Carolina House of Representatives 42nd district general election, 2018
Party	Candidate	Votes	%
Democratic	Marvin Lucas (incumbent)	13,100	76.05%
Republican	Ed Williams	3,684	21.39%
Constitution	Mark A. Crowe	442	2.57%
Total votes		17,226	100%
Democratic hold			

=== 2016 ===
North Carolina House of Representatives 42nd district general election, 2016
Party	Candidate	Votes	%
Democratic	Marvin Lucas (incumbent)	24,213	100%
Total votes		24,213	100%
Democratic hold			

=== 2014 ===
North Carolina House of Representatives 42nd district general election, 2014
Party	Candidate	Votes	%
Democratic	Marvin Lucas (incumbent)	13,708	100%
Total votes		13,708	100%
Democratic hold			

=== 2012 ===
North Carolina House of Representatives 42nd district general election, 2012
Party	Candidate	Votes	%
Democratic	Marvin Lucas (incumbent)	23,240	77.45%
Republican	Frank Racz	6,766	22.55%
Total votes		30,006	100%
Democratic hold			

=== 2010 ===
North Carolina House of Representatives 42nd district general election, 2010
Party	Candidate	Votes	%
Democratic	Marvin Lucas (incumbent)	8,874	100%
Total votes		8,874	100%
Democratic hold			

=== 2008 ===
North Carolina House of Representatives 42nd district general election, 2008
Party	Candidate	Votes	%
Democratic	Marvin Lucas (incumbent)	19,137	100%
Total votes		19,137	100%
Democratic hold			

=== 2006 ===
North Carolina House of Representatives 42nd district general election, 2006
Party	Candidate	Votes	%
Democratic	Marvin Lucas (incumbent)	5,610	100%
Total votes		5,610	100%
Democratic hold			

=== 2004 ===
North Carolina House of Representatives 42nd district general election, 2004
Party	Candidate	Votes	%
Democratic	Marvin Lucas (incumbent)	10,746	66.24%
Republican	Bob White	5,476	33.76%
Total votes		16,222	100%
Democratic hold			

=== 2002 ===
North Carolina House of Representatives 42nd district general election, 2002
Party	Candidate	Votes	%
Democratic	Marvin Lucas (incumbent)	6,845	100%
Total votes		6,845	100%
Democratic hold			

=== 2000 ===
North Carolina House of Representatives 17th district Democratic primary election, 2000
Party	Candidate	Votes	%
Democratic	Mary McAllister (incumbent)	3,472	38.56%
Democratic	Marvin Lucas	2,441	27.11%
Democratic	Theodore James Kinney (incumbent)	1,718	19.08%
Democratic	David K. Hasan	1,374	15.26%
Total votes		9,005	100%

North Carolina House of Representatives 17th district general election, 2000
Party	Candidate	Votes	%
Democratic	Marvin Lucas	12,520	42.05%
Democratic	Mary McAllister (incumbent)	12,141	40.77%
Republican	George E. Boggs	5,115	17.18%
Total votes		29,776	100%
Democratic hold			
Democratic hold			

North Carolina House of Representatives
Preceded by Theodore James Kinney	Member of the North Carolina House of Representatives from the 17th district 2001–2003; Served alongside: Mary McAllister	Succeeded by Bonner Stiller
Preceded by Frank Mitchell	Member of the North Carolina House of Representatives from the 42nd district 2003–2025	Succeeded by Mike Colvin
