= H. Dean Proctor =

American politician from North Carolina

Dean Proctor
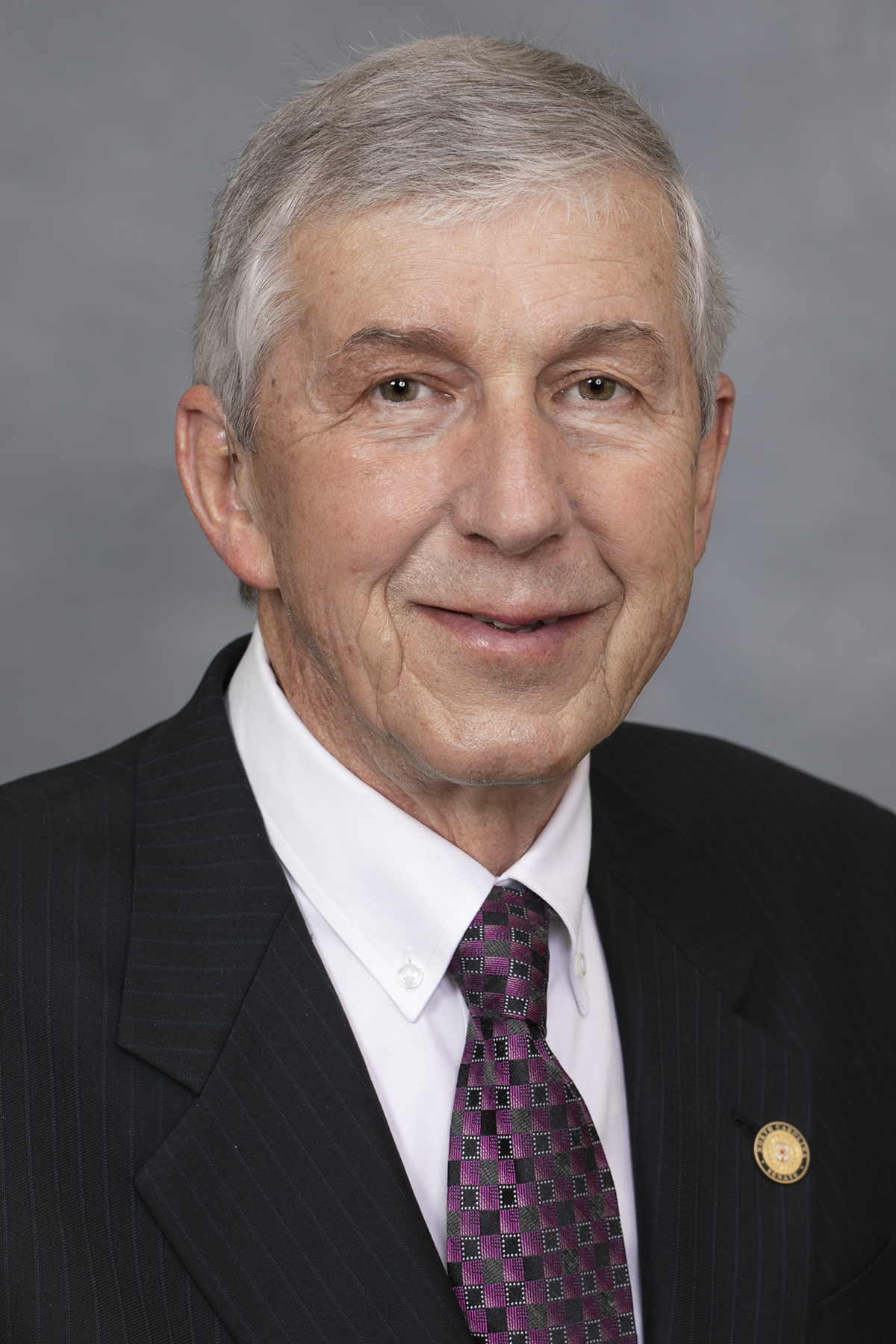
- Official portrait, 2021

Member of the North Carolina Senate
- In office August 15, 2020 – January 1, 2025
- Preceded by: Andy Wells
- Succeeded by: Mark Hollo
- Constituency: 42nd District (2020–2023); 45th District (2023–2025)

Personal details
- Born: c. 1942 (age 83–84)
- Party: Republican
- Education: University of North Carolina at Chapel Hill

H. Dean Proctor (born c. 1942) is an American politician who served as a member of the North Carolina Senate. A Republican from Hickory, North Carolina, he represented the 45th district (which includes all of Catawba County, as well as part of Caldwell County).

== Early life and education ==
Proctor was born around 1942. Proctor earned a bachelor's in business administration from the University of North Carolina at Chapel Hill.

== Career ==
Proctor is a retired beverage wholesaler, who served as the executive of United Beverages. He has previously served on the North Carolina Department of Transportation board and the North Carolina Wildlife Resources Commission board. In July 2020, State Senator Andy Wells resigned from the state senate to serve on the state wildlife resources commission. On August 15, 2020, Proctor was appointed by Catawba and Alexander County Republican leaders to serve the rest of Wells' term in the state senate seat representing the 42nd district. On March 3, 2020, Proctor won the primary against former state representative Mark Hollo to keep his seat in the state senate. On November 3, 2020, Proctor won the general election for the position.

== Personal life ==
Proctor lives in Hickory, North Carolina.

== Electoral history ==
=== 2022 ===
North Carolina Senate 45th district general election, 2022
Party	Candidate	Votes	%
Republican	Dean Proctor (incumbent)	61,327	100%
Total votes		61,327	100%
Republican hold			

=== 2020 ===
North Carolina Senate 42nd district Republican primary election, 2020
Party	Candidate	Votes	%
Republican	Dean Proctor	12,993	52.29%
Republican	Mark Hollo	11,857	47.71%
Total votes		24,850	100%

North Carolina Senate 42nd district general election, 2020
Party	Candidate	Votes	%
Republican	Dean Proctor (incumbent)	72,228	71.27%
Democratic	Tina R. Miles	29,111	28.73%
Total votes		101,339	100%
Republican hold			

North Carolina Senate
Preceded by Andy Wells	Member of the North Carolina Senate from the 42nd District; 2020–2023	Succeeded by Rachel Hunt
Preceded by Deanna Ballard	Member of the North Carolina Senate from the 45th District; 2023–2025	Succeeded by Mark Hollo
