= Mark Hollo =

American politician

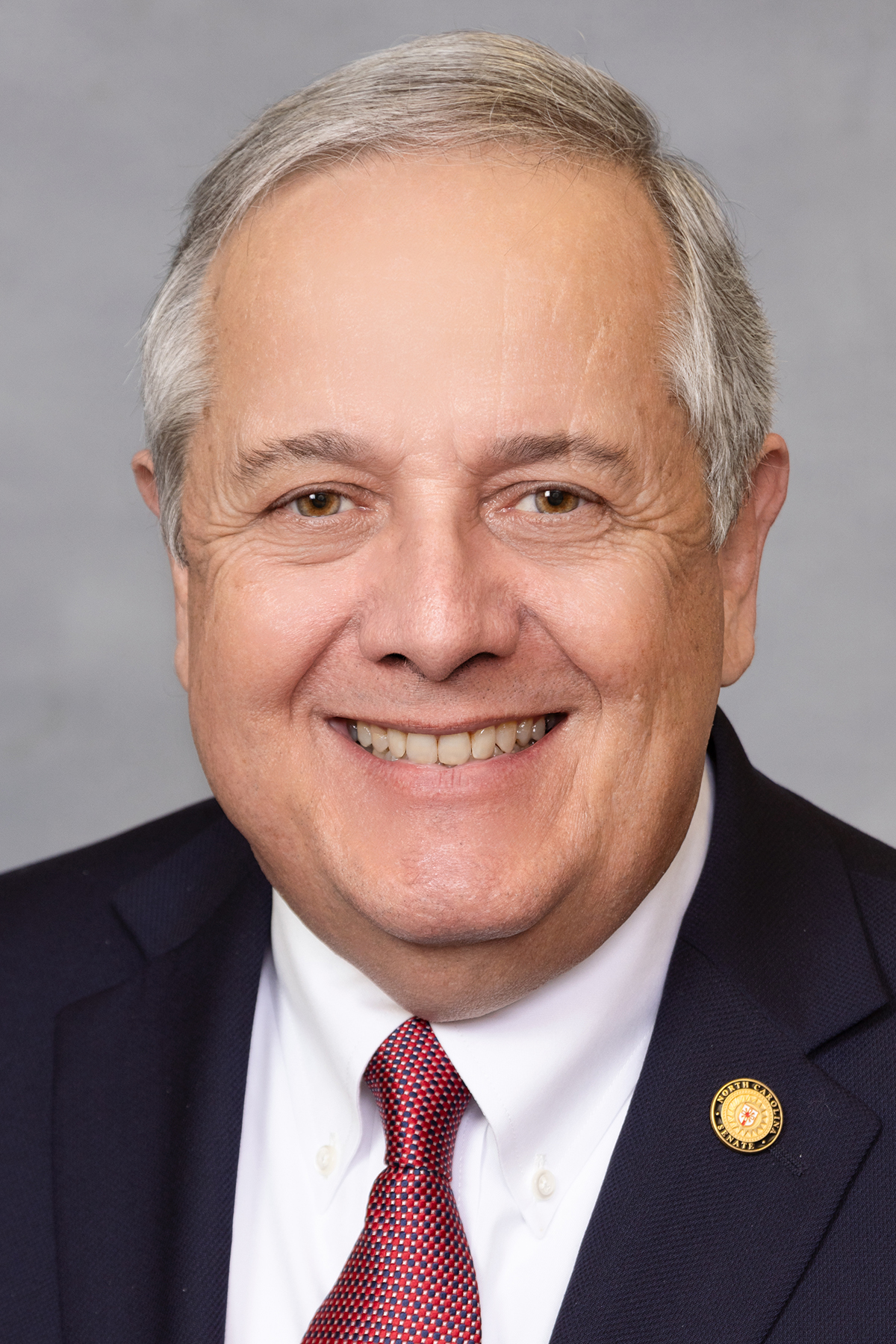

Member of the North Carolina Senate from the 45th district
- Incumbent
- Assumed office January 1, 2025
- Preceded by: Dean Proctor

Member of the North Carolina House of Representatives
- In office January 1, 2011 – January 1, 2015
- Preceded by: Ray Warren
- Succeeded by: Lee Zachary
- Constituency: 88th District (2011–2013); 73rd District (2013–2015)
- In office January 1, 2005 – January 1, 2007
- Preceded by: Constituency established
- Succeeded by: Ray Warren
- Constituency: 88th District

Personal details
- Born: Mark Walter Hollo; July 24, 1958 (age 68) Litchfield, Illinois, U.S.
- Party: Republican
- Spouse: Barbara
- Children: 2
- Education: Southern Illinois University (BS)

Mark Hollo is a Republican member of the North Carolina Senate. He represents the 45th district, including constituents in Catawba and Caldwell counties. Hollo previously served as a member of the North Carolina House of Representatives, who represented the state's 73rd district (including all of Alexander and Yadkin counties as well as part of Wilkes County) district from 2013 until 2015. Prior to redistricting, Hollo represented the 88th district (including all of Alexander County and part of Catawba County) from 2011 until 2013 and also from 2005 until 2007. Hollo was candidate for the 42nd district of the North Carolina Senate (which includes all of Alexander and Catawba Counties) in both 2018 and 2020, losing the Republican nomination to Andy Wells and Dean Proctor, respectively.

== Career ==
Ahead of the 2004 elections, the North Carolina General Assembly drew new districts to be used for elections to itself for the elections up until 2012. The legislature created a new 88th district that included all of Alexander County and part of Catawba County which had no incumbent. Hollo was elected to the seat in 2004, defeating Democratic nominee Joel Harbinson. In 2006 he ran for re-election, but he was defeated by Ray Warren, a former Alexander County Sheriff who had unsuccessfully run for the NC House in 2002. Hollo lost again in a rematch in 2008, but easily gained back his former seat in 2010 when Warren didn't seek re-election. In 2012, legislative redistricting renumbered his district as the 73rd and it traded its Catawba County portion for all of Yadkin County and a small portion of southeast Wilkes County. Hollo faced another incumbent, Darrell McCormick in the 2012 primary, but easily defeated him and won the general election in a landslide against Democratic nominee William Stinson. Hollo didn't seek re-election in 2014. Hollo unsuccessfully ran for the North Carolina Senate in the 42nd district in both 2018 and 2020, losing the Republican nomination both times. In both elections, Hollo had a strong lead amongst Alexander County voters but lost to his opponents Wells and Proctor in the more populous Catawba County portion of the district.

== Committee assignments ==
=== 2013-2014 session ===
- Appropriations (Vice Chair)
- Health and Human Services (Chair)
- Homeland Security, Military, and Veterans Affairs
- Public Utilities
- State Personnel

=== 2011-2012 session ===
- Appropriations
- Health and Human Services - Chair
- Homeland Security, Military, and Veterans Affairs
- Public Utilities

== Electoral history ==
=== 2024 ===
North Carolina Senate 45th district Republican primary election, 2024
Party	Candidate	Votes	%
Republican	Mark Hollo	16,390	60.40%
Republican	Nancy Meek	10,746	39.60%
Total votes		27,136	100%

North Carolina Senate 45th district general election, 2024
Party	Candidate	Votes	%
Republican	Mark Hollo	80,033	70.28%
Democratic	Kim Bost	33,840	29.72%
Total votes		113,873	100%
Republican hold			

=== 2020 ===
North Carolina Senate 42nd district Republican Primary election, 2020
Party	Candidate	Votes	%
Republican	Dean Proctor	12,993	52.29%
Republican	Mark Hollo	11,857	47.71%
Total votes		24,850	100%

=== 2018 ===
North Carolina Senate 42nd district Republican Primary election, 2018
Party	Candidate	Votes	%
Republican	Andy Wells (incumbent)	9,018	47.46%
Republican	Mark Hollo	6,506	34.24%
Republican	Ryan Huffman	2,236	11.77%
Republican	Dustin Long	1,241	6.53%
Total votes		19,001	100%

=== 2012 ===
North Carolina House of Representatives 73rd district Republican Primary election, 2012
Party	Candidate	Votes	%
Republican	Mark Hollo (incumbent)	9,070	67.60%
Republican	Darrell McCormick (incumbent)	4,347	32.40%
Total votes		13,417	100%

North Carolina House of Representatives 73rd district general election, 2012
Party	Candidate	Votes	%
Republican	Mark Hollo (incumbent)	24,076	71.37%
Democratic	William Stinson	9,659	28.63%
Total votes		33,735	100%
Republican hold			

=== 2010 ===
North Carolina House of Representatives 88th district general election, 2010
Party	Candidate	Votes	%
Republican	Mark Hollo	13,587	64.36%
Democratic	David Munday	7,525	35.64%
Total votes		21,112	100%
Republican gain from Democratic			

=== 2008 ===
North Carolina House of Representatives 88th district general election, 2008
Party	Candidate	Votes	%
Democratic	Ray Warren (incumbent)	15,729	50.33%
Republican	Mark Hollo	15,520	49.67%
Total votes		31,249	100%
Democratic hold			

=== 2006 ===
North Carolina House of Representatives 88th district general election, 2006
Party	Candidate	Votes	%
Democratic	Ray Warren	9,650	52.61%
Republican	Mark Hollo (incumbent)	8,693	47.39%
Total votes		18,343	100%
Democratic gain from Republican			

=== 2004 ===
North Carolina House of Representatives 88th district Republican Primary election, 2004
Party	Candidate	Votes	%
Republican	Mark Hollo	2,264	42.63%
Republican	Grimes Byerly	1,935	36.43%
Republican	Jill Griffin	819	15.42%
Republican	William "Ray" Henderson	293	5.52%
Total votes		5,311	100%

North Carolina House of Representatives 88th district general election, 2004
Party	Candidate	Votes	%
Republican	Mark Hollo	15,587	56.31%
Democratic	Joel Harbinson	12,096	43.69%
Total votes		27,683	100%
Republican win (new seat)			

North Carolina House of Representatives
Preceded by Mark Hilton	Member of the North Carolina House of Representatives from the 88th district 2005–2007	Succeeded by Ray Warren
Preceded by Ray Warren	Member of the North Carolina House of Representatives from the 88th district 2011–2013	Succeeded by Rob Bryan
Preceded by Joyce Krawiec	Member of the North Carolina House of Representatives from the 73rd district 2013–2015	Succeeded by Lee Zachary
North Carolina Senate
Preceded by Dean Proctor	Member-elect of the North Carolina Senate from the 45th district 2025–Present	Incumbent
