= North Carolina's 42nd Senate district =

American legislative district

North Carolina's 42nd State Senate district
Senator
Woodson Bradley; D–Charlotte
- Demographics: 63% White; 12% Black; 10% Hispanic; 10% Asian; 5% Multiracial
- Population (2023): 211,718

North Carolina's 42nd Senate district is one of 50 districts in the North Carolina Senate. It has been represented by Democrat Woodson Bradley since 2025.

== Geography ==
Since 2023, the district has covered part of Mecklenburg County. The district overlaps with the 100th, 102nd, 103rd, 104th, and 105th state house districts.

== District officeholders since 1993 ==
Senator	Party	Dates	Notes	Counties
District created January 1, 1993.				1993–2003; All of Graham, Cherokee, Clay, and Polk counties. Parts of Macon, Jackson, Transylvania, Haywood, Henderson, and Buncombe counties.
Bob Carpenter (Franklin)	Republican	January 1, 1993 – January 1, 2003	Redistricted from the 29th district. Redistricted to the 50th district.	1993–2003; All of Graham, Cherokee, Clay, and Polk counties. Parts of Macon, Jackson, Transylvania, Haywood, Henderson, and Buncombe counties.
James Forrester (Stanley)	Republican	January 1, 2003 – January 1, 2005	Redistricted from the 39th district. Redistricted to the 41st district.	2003–2005; All of Lincoln County. Parts of Gaston and Catawba Counties.
Austin Allran (Hickory)	Republican	January 1, 2005 – January 1, 2015	Redistricted from the 44th district. Retired.	2005–2013; All of Catawba County. Part of Iredell County.
Austin Allran (Hickory)	Republican	January 1, 2005 – January 1, 2015	Redistricted from the 44th district. Retired.	2013–2023; All of Catawba and Alexander counties.
Andy Wells (Hickory)	Republican	January 1, 2015 – July 27, 2020	Retired to run for Lieutenant Governor and resigned early.	2013–2023; All of Catawba and Alexander counties.
Vacant		July 27, 2020 - August 15, 2020		2013–2023; All of Catawba and Alexander counties.
Dean Proctor (Hickory)	Republican	August 15, 2020 – January 1, 2023	Appointed to finish Wells' term. Redistricted to the 45th district.	2013–2023; All of Catawba and Alexander counties.
Rachel Hunt (Charlotte)	Democratic	January 1, 2023 – January 1, 2025	Retired to run for Lieutenant Governor.	2023–Present; Part of Mecklenburg County.
Woodson Bradley (Charlotte)	Democratic	January 1, 2025 – Present		2023–Present; Part of Mecklenburg County.

== Election results ==
=== 2024 ===
North Carolina Senate 42nd district Republican primary election, 2024
Party	Candidate	Votes	%
Republican	Stacie McGinn	11,336	51.72%
Republican	Jaime Daniell	10,584	48.28%
Total votes		21,920	100%

North Carolina Senate 42nd district general election, 2024
Party	Candidate	Votes	%
Democratic	Woodson Bradley	62,260	50.08%
Republican	Stacie McGinn	62,051	49.92%
Total votes		124,311	100%
Democratic hold			

=== 2022 ===
North Carolina Senate 42nd district Republican primary election, 2022
Party	Candidate	Votes	%
Republican	Cheryl Russo	6,775	50.51%
Republican	Scott Stone	6,638	49.49%
Total votes		13,413	100%

North Carolina Senate 42nd district general election, 2022
Party	Candidate	Votes	%
Democratic	Rachel Hunt	47,621	54.96%
Republican	Cheryl Russo	39,024	45.04%
Total votes		86,645	100%
Democratic hold			

=== 2020 ===
North Carolina Senate 42nd district Republican primary election, 2020
Party	Candidate	Votes	%
Republican	Dean Proctor	12,993	52.29%
Republican	Mark Hollo	11,857	47.71%
Total votes		24,850	100%

North Carolina Senate 42nd district general election, 2020
Party	Candidate	Votes	%
Republican	Dean Proctor (incumbent)	72,228	71.27%
Democratic	Tina R. Miles	29,111	28.73%
Total votes		101,339	100%
Republican hold			

=== 2018 ===
North Carolina Senate 42nd district Republican primary election, 2018
Party	Candidate	Votes	%
Republican	Andy Wells (incumbent)	9,018	47.46%
Republican	Mark Hollo	6,506	34.24%
Republican	Ryan Huffman	2,236	11.77%
Republican	Dustin Long	1,241	6.53%
Total votes		19,001	100%

North Carolina Senate 42nd district general election, 2018
Party	Candidate	Votes	%
Republican	Andy Wells (incumbent)	44,323	66.31%
Democratic	Ric Vandett	22,522	33.69%
Total votes		66,845	100%
Republican hold			

=== 2016 ===
North Carolina Senate 42nd district general election, 2016
Party	Candidate	Votes	%
Republican	Andy Wells (incumbent)	69,301	100%
Total votes		69,301	100%
Republican hold			

=== 2014 ===
North Carolina Senate 42nd district general election, 2014
Party	Candidate	Votes	%
Republican	Andy Wells	31,869	59.49%
Democratic	Patrice "Pat" Hensley	21,703	40.51%
Total votes		53,572	100%
Republican hold			

=== 2012 ===
North Carolina Senate 42nd district Democratic primary election, 2012
Party	Candidate	Votes	%
Democratic	Joseph "Jody" Inglefield	7,166	67.15%
Democratic	Bivins Hollar	3,505	32.85%
Total votes		10,671	100%

North Carolina Senate 42nd district general election, 2012
Party	Candidate	Votes	%
Republican	Austin Allran (incumbent)	54,128	64.53%
Democratic	Joseph "Jody" Inglefield	29,757	35.47%
Total votes		83,885	100%
Republican hold			

=== 2010 ===
North Carolina Senate 42nd district general election, 2010
Party	Candidate	Votes	%
Republican	Austin Allran (incumbent)	37,429	100%
Total votes		37,429	100%
Republican hold			

=== 2008 ===
North Carolina Senate 42nd district Republican primary election, 2008
Party	Candidate	Votes	%
Republican	Austin Allran (incumbent)	10,464	65.46%
Republican	Kitty Barnes	5,522	34.54%
Total votes		15,986	100%

North Carolina Senate 42nd district general election, 2008
Party	Candidate	Votes	%
Republican	Austin Allran (incumbent)	59,574	100%
Total votes		59,574	100%
Republican hold			

=== 2006 ===
North Carolina Senate 42nd district general election, 2006
Party	Candidate	Votes	%
Republican	Austin Allran (incumbent)	22,671	55.87%
Democratic	Lyndon Helton	17,906	44.13%
Total votes		40,577	100%
Republican hold			

=== 2004 ===
North Carolina Senate 42nd district general election, 2004
Party	Candidate	Votes	%
Republican	Austin Allran (incumbent)	51,623	100%
Total votes		51,623	100%
Republican hold			

=== 2002 ===
North Carolina Senate 42nd district Republican primary election, 2002
Party	Candidate	Votes	%
Republican	James Forrester (incumbent)	9,625	80.46%
Republican	Ronald Pope	2,337	19.54%
Total votes		11,962	100%

North Carolina Senate 42nd district general election, 2002
Party	Candidate	Votes	%
Republican	James Forrester (incumbent)	36,478	100%
Total votes		36,478	100%
Republican hold			

=== 2000 ===
North Carolina Senate 42nd district Republican primary election, 2000
Party	Candidate	Votes	%
Republican	Bob Carpenter (incumbent)	7,115	69.35%
Republican	D. Kim Talbot	1,652	16.10%
Republican	Dan West	1,492	14.54%
Total votes		10,259	100%

North Carolina Senate 42nd district general election, 2000
Party	Candidate	Votes	%
Republican	Bob Carpenter (incumbent)	52,299	90.04%
Libertarian	Larry R. Gavel	5,788	9.96%
Total votes		58,087	100%
Republican hold			
