= 2020 North Carolina Senate election =

- November 3, 2020

All 50 seats in the North Carolina Senate 26 (without Lieutenant Governor) seats needed for a majority
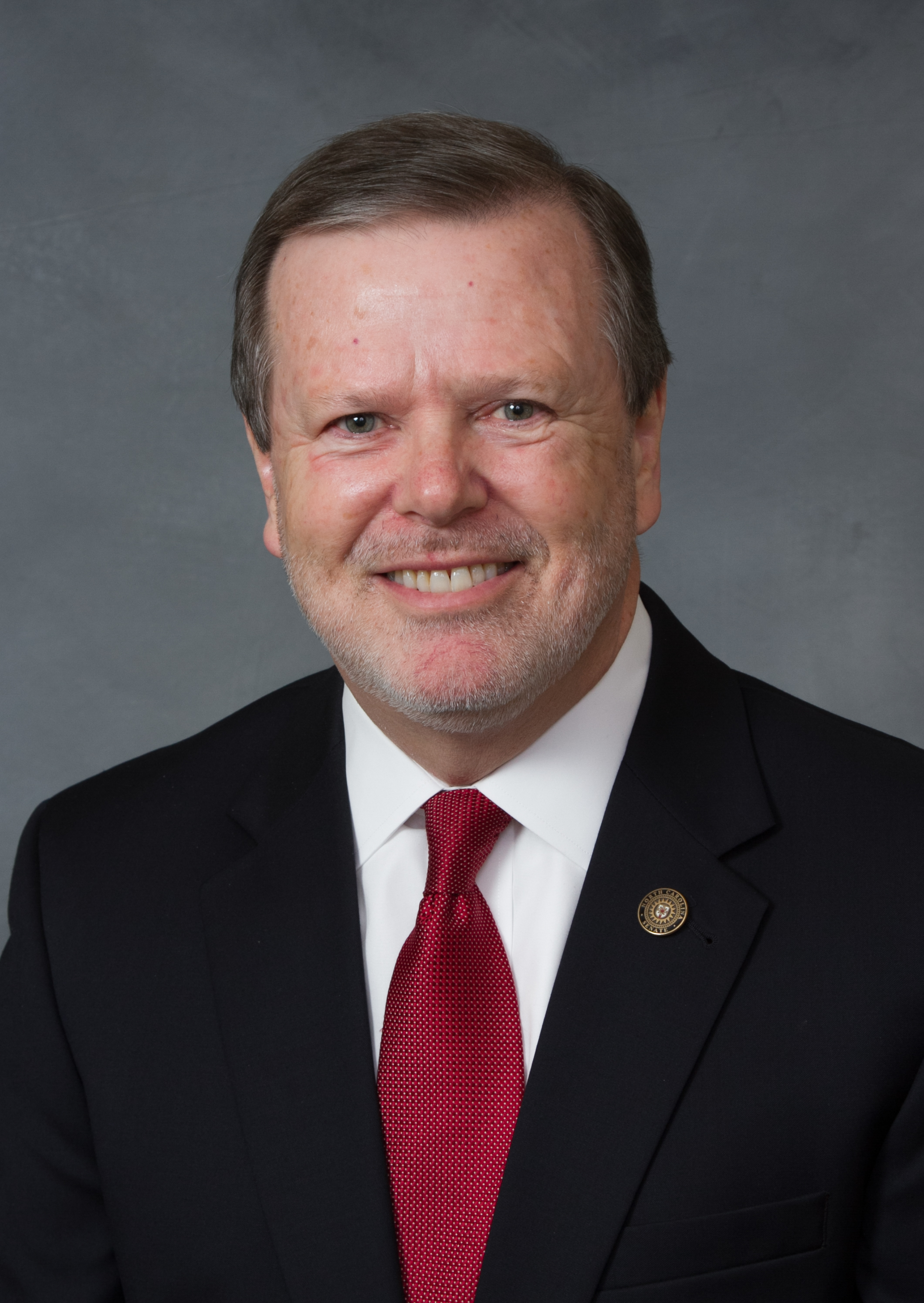

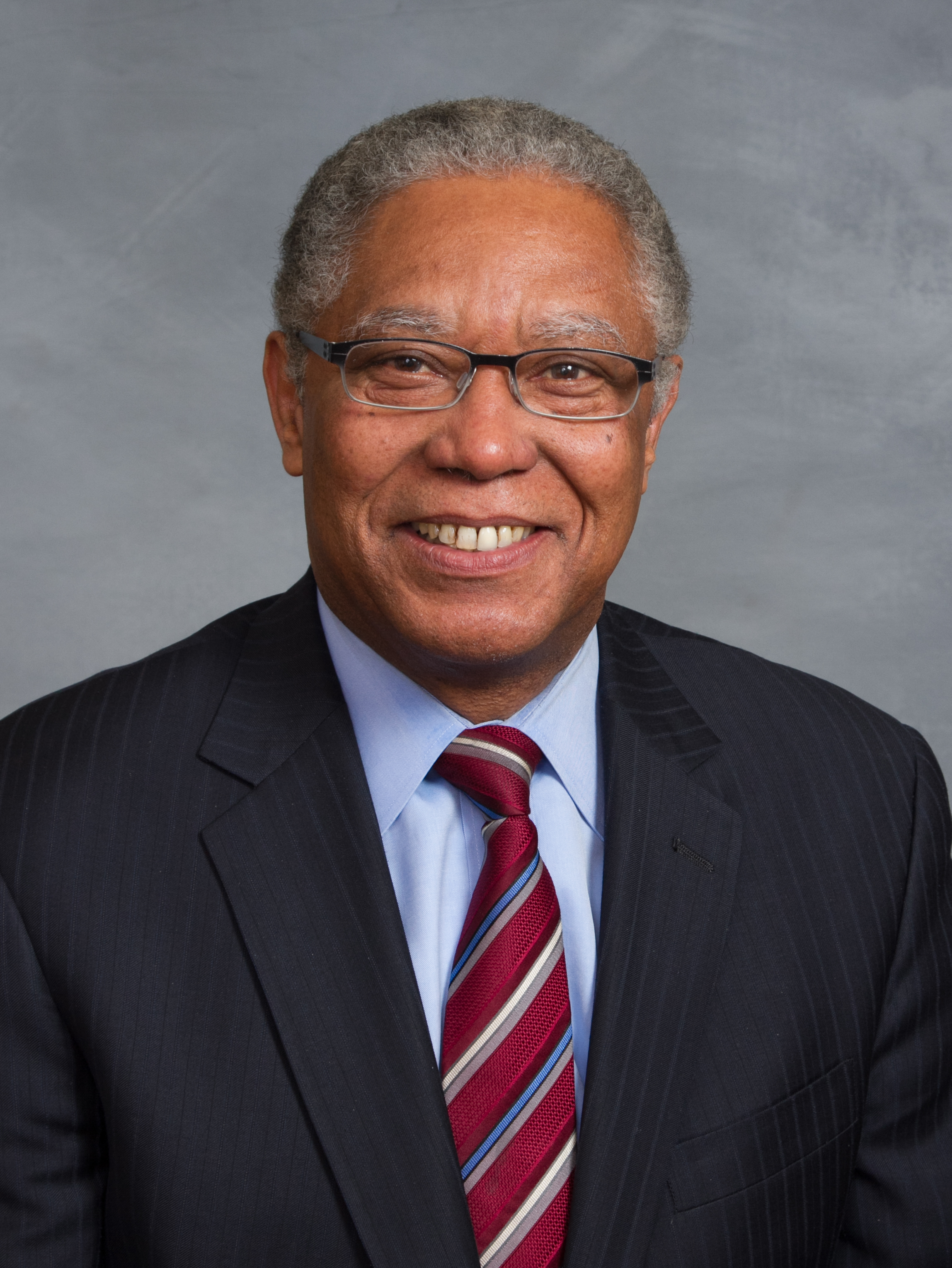
	Majority party	Minority party
Leader	Phil Berger	Dan Blue
Party	Republican	Democratic
Leader since	January 1, 2005	March 2, 2014
Leader's seat	30th - Eden	14th - Raleigh
Last election	29	21
Seats won	28	22
Seat change	▼1	▲1
Popular vote	2,682,645	2,530,188
Percentage	50.78%	47.89%
- Results: Democratic gain Republican gain Democratic hold Republican hold
President pro tempore before election
Phil Berger
Republican
Elected President pro tempore
Phil Berger
Republican

An election was held on November 3, 2020, to elect all 50 members to North Carolina's Senate. The election coincided with the elections for other offices, including the Presidency, U.S. Senate, Governor, U.S. House of Representatives, and state house. The primary election was held on March 3, 2020, with a run-off on June 23, 2020.

== Background ==
In October 2020, The Washington Post identified this state election, along with the concurrent North Carolina House of Representatives election, as one of eight whose outcomes could affect partisan balance during post-census redistricting. New districts were being used in this election.

== Predictions ==
Source	Ranking	As of
The Cook Political Report	Tossup	October 21, 2020

== Results summary ==
District	Incumbent	Party	Elected	Party
1st	Bob Steinburg	Rep	Bob Steinburg	Rep
2nd	Norman Sanderson	Rep	Norman Sanderson	Rep
3rd	Erica Smith†	Dem	Ernestine Bazemore	Dem
4th	Toby Fitch	Dem	Toby Fitch	Dem
5th	Don Davis	Dem	Don Davis	Dem
6th	Harry Brown†	Rep	Michael Lazzara	Rep
7th	Jim Perry	Rep	Jim Perry	Rep
8th	Bill Rabon	Rep	Bill Rabon	Rep
9th	Harper Peterson	Dem	Michael Lee	Rep
10th	Brent Jackson	Rep	Brent Jackson	Rep
11th	Rick Horner†	Rep	Lisa Stone Barnes	Rep
12th	Jim Burgin	Rep	Jim Burgin	Rep
13th	Danny Britt	Rep	Danny Britt	Rep
14th	Dan Blue	Dem	Dan Blue	Dem
15th	Jay Chaudhuri	Dem	Jay Chaudhuri	Dem
16th	Wiley Nickel	Dem	Wiley Nickel	Dem
17th	Sam Searcy	Dem	Sam Searcy	Dem
18th	John Alexander†	Rep	Sarah Crawford	Dem
19th	Kirk deViere	Dem	Kirk deViere	Dem
20th	Natalie Murdock	Dem	Natalie Murdock	Dem
21st	Ben Clark	Dem	Ben Clark	Dem
22nd	Mike Woodard	Dem	Mike Woodard	Dem
23rd	Valerie Foushee	Dem	Valerie Foushee	Dem
24th	Rick Gunn†	Rep	Amy Galey	Rep
25th	Tom McInnis	Rep	Tom McInnis	Rep
26th	Dave Craven	Rep	Dave Craven	Rep
27th	Michael Garrett	Dem	Michael Garrett	Dem
28th	Gladys Robinson	Dem	Gladys Robinson	Dem
29th	Eddie Gallimore	Rep	Steve Jarvis	Rep
30th	Phil Berger	Rep	Phil Berger	Rep
31st	Joyce Krawiec	Rep	Joyce Krawiec	Rep
32nd	Paul Lowe Jr.	Dem	Paul Lowe Jr.	Dem
33rd	Carl Ford	Rep	Carl Ford	Rep
34th	Vickie Sawyer	Rep	Vickie Sawyer	Rep
35th	Todd Johnson	Rep	Todd Johnson	Rep
36th	Paul Newton	Rep	Paul Newton	Rep
37th	Jeff Jackson	Dem	Jeff Jackson	Dem
38th	Mujtaba Mohammed	Dem	Mujtaba Mohammed	Dem
39th	Rob Bryan†	Rep	DeAndrea Salvador	Dem
40th	Joyce Waddell	Dem	Joyce Waddell	Dem
41st	Natasha Marcus	Dem	Natasha Marcus	Dem
42nd	Dean Proctor	Rep	Dean Proctor	Rep
43rd	Kathy Harrington	Rep	Kathy Harrington	Rep
44th	Ted Alexander	Rep	Ted Alexander	Rep
45th	Deanna Ballard	Rep	Deanna Ballard	Rep
46th	Warren Daniel	Rep	Warren Daniel	Rep
47th	Ralph Hise	Rep	Ralph Hise	Rep
48th	Chuck Edwards	Rep	Chuck Edwards	Rep
49th	Terry Van Duyn†	Dem	Julie Mayfield	Dem
50th	Jim Davis†	Rep	Kevin Corbin	Rep

† - Incumbent not seeking re-election

Party	Candi- dates	Votes		Seats		
Party	Candi- dates	No.	%	No.	+/–	%
Republican Party	50	2,682,645	50.778	28	▼1	56
Democratic Party	50	2,530,188	47.893	22	▲1	44
Libertarian Party	8	37,919	0.718	0	Steady	0
Constitution Party	1	32,295	0.611	0	Steady	0
Total	109	5,283,047	100	50	Steady	100

Senate seats
Republican	56%
Democratic	44%

Popular vote
Republican	50.778%
Democratic	47.893%
Libertarian	0.718%
Constitution	0.611%

=== Close races ===
Districts where the margin of victory was under 10%:

1. District 9, 1.02% (gain)
2. District 19, 3.06%
3. District 3, 4.06%
4. District 24, 4.86%
5. District 31, 6.16%
6. District 17, 6.64%
7. District 18, 7.68% (gain)
8. District 27, 8.64%
9. District 11, 9.96%

=== Incumbents defeated in primary election ===
- Eddie Gallimore (R-District 29), defeated by Steve Jarvis (R)

=== Incumbents defeated in general election ===
- Harper Peterson (D-District 9), defeated by Michael Lee (R)

=== Open seats that changed parties ===
- John Alexander (R-District 18) did not seek re-election, seat won by Sarah Crawford (D)
- Rob Bryan (R-District 39) did not seek re-election, seat won by DeAndrea Salvador (D)

== Detailed results ==
=== Districts 1–25 ===
==== District 1 ====
Incumbent Republican Bob Steinburg had represented the 1st district since 2019.

North Carolina Senate 1st district general election, 2020
Party	Candidate	Votes	%
Republican	Bob Steinburg (incumbent)	58,319	55.24%
Democratic	Tess Judge	47,248	44.76%
Total votes		105,567	100%
Republican hold			

==== District 2 ====
Incumbent Republican Norman Sanderson had represented the 2nd district since 2013.

North Carolina Senate 2nd district general election, 2020
Party	Candidate	Votes	%
Republican	Norman Sanderson (incumbent)	63,014	63.16%
Democratic	Libbie Griffin	32,870	32.95%
Libertarian	Tim Harris	3,884	3.89%
Total votes		99,768	100%
Republican hold			

==== District 3 ====
Incumbent Democrat Erica Smith had represented the 3rd district since 2015. Smith ran unsuccessfully for the U.S. Senate, losing the Democratic primary to Cal Cunningham. Democrat Ernestine Bazemore won the open seat.

North Carolina Senate 3rd district general election, 2020
Party	Candidate	Votes	%
Democratic	Ernestine Bazemore	45,507	52.03%
Republican	Thomas S. Hester Jr.	41,959	47.97%
Total votes		87,466	100%
Democratic hold			

==== District 4 ====
Incumbent Democrat Toby Fitch had represented the 4th district since 2018.

North Carolina Senate 4th district general election, 2020
Party	Candidate	Votes	%
Democratic	Toby Fitch (incumbent)	51,384	57.16%
Republican	Sammy Davis Webb	38,514	42.84%
Total votes		89,898	100%
Democratic hold			

==== District 5 ====
Incumbent Democrat Don Davis had represented the 5th district since 2013, and previously from 2009 to 2011.

North Carolina Senate 5th district general election, 2020
Party	Candidate	Votes	%
Democratic	Don Davis (incumbent)	51,702	55.12%
Republican	Karen Kozel	42,104	44.88%
Total votes		93,806	100%
Democratic hold			

==== District 6 ====
Incumbent Republican Majority Leader Harry Brown had represented the 6th district since 2004. Brown did not seek re-election, and fellow Republican Michael Lazzara won the open seat.

North Carolina Senate 6th district general election, 2020
Party	Candidate	Votes	%
Republican	Michael Lazzara	49,007	65.48%
Democratic	Isaiah (Ike) Johnson	25,831	34.52%
Total votes		74,838	100%
Republican hold			

==== District 7 ====
Incumbent Republican Jim Perry had represented the 7th district since 2019. Perry was elected to his first full term.

North Carolina Senate 7th district general election, 2020
Party	Candidate	Votes	%
Republican	Jim Perry (incumbent)	45,364	55.25%
Democratic	Donna Lake	36,737	44.75%
Total votes		82,101	100%
Republican hold			

==== District 8 ====
Incumbent Republican Bill Rabon had represented the 8th district since 2011.

North Carolina Senate 8th district general election, 2020
Party	Candidate	Votes	%
Republican	Bill Rabon (incumbent)	85,484	62.01%
Democratic	David Sink	48,040	34.85%
Libertarian	Anthony Mascolo	4,335	3.14%
Total votes		137,859	100%
Republican hold			

==== District 9 ====
Incumbent Democrat Harper Peterson had represented the 9th district since 2019. Republican Michael Lee defeated Peterson in a rematch of the 2018election.

North Carolina Senate 9th district general election, 2020
Party	Candidate	Votes	%
Republican	Michael Lee	63,255	50.51%
Democratic	Harper Peterson (incumbent)	61,987	49.49%
Total votes		125,242	100%
Republican gain from Democratic			

==== District 10 ====
Incumbent Republican Brent Jackson had represented the 10th district since 2011.

North Carolina Senate 10th district general election, 2020
Party	Candidate	Votes	%
Republican	Brent Jackson (incumbent)	56,740	65.09%
Democratic	Vernon R. Moore	30,425	34.91%
Total votes		87,165	100%
Republican hold			

==== District 11 ====
Incumbent Republican Rick Horner had represented the 11th district since 2017. Horner did not seek re-election. Republican representative Lisa Stone Barnes defeated Democratic former state senator Allen Wellons in the general election.

North Carolina Senate 11th district general election, 2020
Party	Candidate	Votes	%
Republican	Lisa Stone Barnes	61,287	54.98%
Democratic	Allen Wellons	50,193	45.02%
Total votes		111,479	100%
Republican hold			

==== District 12 ====
Incumbent Republican Jim Burgin had represented the 12th district since 2019.

North Carolina Senate 12th district general election, 2020
Party	Candidate	Votes	%
Republican	Jim Burgin (incumbent)	57,295	60.84%
Democratic	John Kirkman	36,875	39.16%
Total votes		94,170	100%
Republican hold			

==== District 13 ====
Incumbent Republican Danny Britt had represented the 13th district since 2017.

North Carolina Senate 13th district general election, 2020
Party	Candidate	Votes	%
Republican	Danny Britt (incumbent)	45,264	63.56%
Democratic	Barbara Yates-Lockamy	25,949	36.44%
Total votes		71,213	100%
Republican hold			

==== District 14 ====
Incumbent Democratic Minority Leader Dan Blue had represented the 14th district since 2009.

North Carolina Senate 14th district general election, 2020
Party	Candidate	Votes	%
Democratic	Dan Blue (incumbent)	78,811	72.68%
Republican	Alan David Michael	24,678	22.76%
Libertarian	Justin Walczak	4,949	4.56%
Total votes		108,438	100%
Democratic hold			

==== District 15 ====
Incumbent Democrat Jay Chaudhuri had represented the 15th district and its predecessors since 2016.

North Carolina Senate district general election, 2020
Party	Candidate	Votes	%
Democratic	Jay Chaudhuri (incumbent)	71,700	58.01%
Republican	Mario J. Lomuscio	45,457	36.78%
Libertarian	Kat McDonald	6,441	5.21%
Total votes		123,598	100%
Democratic hold			

==== District 16 ====
Incumbent Democrat Wiley Nickel had represented the 16th district since 2019.

North Carolina Senate 16th district general election, 2020
Party	Candidate	Votes	%
Democratic	Wiley Nickel (incumbent)	80,530	65.65%
Republican	Will Marsh	42,144	34.35%
Total votes		122,674	100%
Democratic hold			

==== District 17 ====
Incumbent Democrat Sam Searcy had represented the 17th district since 2019.

North Carolina Senate 17th district general election, 2020
Party	Candidate	Votes	%
Democratic	Sam Searcy (incumbent)	83,564	51.41%
Republican	Mark Cavaliero	72,774	44.77%
Libertarian	Travis Groo	6,204	3.82%
Total votes		162,542	100%
Democratic hold			

==== District 18 ====
Incumbent Republican John Alexander had represented the 18th district and its predecessors since 2015. Alexander didn't seek re-election and Democrat Sarah Crawford won the open seat.

North Carolina Senate 18th district general election, 2020
Party	Candidate	Votes	%
Democratic	Sarah Crawford	67,912	52.08%
Republican	Larry E. Norman	57,890	44.40%
Libertarian	Jason Loeback	4,595	3.52%
Total votes		130,397	100%
Democratic gain from Republican			

==== District 19 ====
Incumbent Democrat Kirk deViere had represented the 19th district since 2019. Former senator Wesley Meredith unsuccessfully sought to regain his seat in a rematch with DeViere.

North Carolina Senate 19th district general election, 2020
Party	Candidate	Votes	%
Democratic	Kirk deViere (incumbent)	46,740	51.53%
Republican	Wesley Meredith	43,966	48.47%
Total votes		90,706	100%
Democratic hold			

==== District 20 ====
Incumbent Democrat Natalie Murdock had represented the 20th district since her appointment on April 2, 2020. Murdock was elected to a full term.

North Carolina Senate 20th district general election, 2020
Party	Candidate	Votes	%
Democratic	Natalie Murdock (incumbent)	102,732	83.61%
Republican	John Tarantino	20,143	16.39%
Total votes		122,875	100%
Democratic hold			

==== District 21 ====
Incumbent Democrat Ben Clark had represented the 21st district since 2013.

North Carolina Senate 21st district general election, 2020
Party	Candidate	Votes	%
Democratic	Ben Clark (incumbent)	50,105	68.02%
Republican	Sev Palacios	23,557	31.98%
Total votes		73,662	100%
Democratic hold			

==== District 22 ====
Incumbent Democrat Mike Woodard had represented the 22nd district since 2013.

North Carolina Senate 22nd district general election, 2020
Party	Candidate	Votes	%
Democratic	Mike Woodard (incumbent)	60,402	58.43%
Republican	Rick Padgett	39,792	38.50%
Libertarian	Ray Ubinger	3,175	3.07%
Total votes		103,369	100%
Democratic hold			

==== District 23 ====
Incumbent Democrat Valerie Foushee had represented the 23rd district since 2013.

North Carolina Senate 23rd district general election, 2020
Party	Candidate	Votes	%
Democratic	Valerie Foushee (incumbent)	88,429	68.31%
Republican	Tom Glendinning	41,016	31.69%
Total votes		129,445	100%
Democratic hold			

==== District 24 ====
Incumbent Republican Rick Gunn had represented the 24th district since 2011. Gunn did not seek re-election, and fellow Republican Amy Galey won the open seat.

North Carolina Senate 24th district general election, 2020
Party	Candidate	Votes	%
Republican	Amy Galey	61,287	52.43%
Democratic	J. D. Wooten	55,609	47.57%
Total votes		116,896	100%
Republican hold			

==== District 25 ====
Incumbent Republican Tom McInnis had represented the 25th district since 2015.

North Carolina Senate 25th district general election, 2020
Party	Candidate	Votes	%
Republican	Tom McInnis (incumbent)	60,152	59.15%
Democratic	Helen Probst Mills	41,546	40.85%
Total votes		101,698	100%
Republican hold			

=== Districts 26–50 ===
==== District 26 ====
incumbent Republican Dave Craven had represented the 26th district since his appointment in 2020. Craven was elected to his first full term.

North Carolina Senate 26th district general election, 2020
Party	Candidate	Votes	%
Republican	Dave Craven (incumbent)	63,077	70.33%
Democratic	Jane Ledwell Gant	26,609	29.67%
Total votes		89,686	100%
Republican hold			

==== District 27 ====
Incumbent Democrat Michael Garrett had represented the 27th district since 2019.

North Carolina Senate 27th district general election, 2020
Party	Candidate	Votes	%
Democratic	Michael Garrett (incumbent)	67,287	54.32%
Republican	Sebastian King	56,575	45.68%
Total votes		123,862	100%
Democratic hold			

==== District 28 ====
Incumbent Democrat Gladys Robinson had represented the 28th district since 2011.

North Carolina Senate 28th district general election, 2020
Party	Candidate	Votes	%
Democratic	Gladys Robinson (incumbent)	75,640	76.34%
Republican	D. R. King	23,440	23.66%
Total votes		99,080	100%
Democratic hold			

==== District 29 ====
Incumbent Republican Eddie Gallimore had represented the 29th district since 2019. Gallimore lost re-nomination to representative Steve Jarvis. Jarvis won the open seat.

North Carolina Senate 29th district general election, 2020
Party	Candidate	Votes	%
Republican	Steve Jarvis	74,210	74.49%
Democratic	Duskin Lassiter	25,409	25.51%
Total votes		99,619	100%
Republican hold			

==== District 30 ====
Incumbent Republican president pro tempore Phil Berger had represented the 30th district and its predecessors since 2001.

North Carolina Senate 30th district general election, 2020
Party	Candidate	Votes	%
Republican	Phil Berger (incumbent)	68,708	68.58%
Democratic	Wally White	31,481	31.42%
Total votes		100,189	100%
Republican hold			

==== District 31 ====
Incumbent Republican Joyce Krawiec had represented the 31st district since 2014.

North Carolina Senate 31st district general election, 2020
Party	Candidate	Votes	%
Republican	Joyce Krawiec (incumbent)	56,479	53.08%
Democratic	Terri Elizabeth LeGrand	49,929	46.92%
Total votes		106,408	100%
Republican hold			

==== District 32 ====
Incumbent Democrat Paul Lowe Jr. had represented the 32nd district since 2015.

North Carolina Senate 32nd district general election, 2020
Party	Candidate	Votes	%
Democratic	Paul Lowe Jr. (incumbent)	67,293	59.40%
Republican	Ven Challa	45,995	40.60%
Total votes		113,288	100%
Democratic hold			

==== District 33 ====
Incumbent Republican Carl Ford had represented the 33rd district since 2019.

North Carolina Senate 33rd district general election, 2020
Party	Candidate	Votes	%
Republican	Carl Ford (incumbent)	73,453	70.54%
Democratic	Tarsha Ellis	30,679	29.46%
Total votes		104,132	100%
Republican hold			

==== District 34 ====
Incumbent Republican Vickie Sawyer had represented the 34th district since 2019.

North Carolina Senate 34th district general election, 2020
Party	Candidate	Votes	%
Republican	Vickie Sawyer (incumbent)	83,707	71.01%
Democratic	Barry Templeton	34,172	28.99%
Total votes		117,879	100%
Republican hold			

==== District 35 ====
Incumbent Republican Todd Johnson had represented the 35th district since 2019.

North Carolina Senate 35th district general election, 2020
Party	Candidate	Votes	%
Republican	Todd Johnson (incumbent)	75,055	63.45%
Democratic	Jose Santiago	43,244	36.55%
Total votes		118,299	100%
Republican hold			

==== District 36 ====
Incumbent Republican Paul Newton had represented the 36th district since 2017.

North Carolina Senate 36th district general election, 2020
Party	Candidate	Votes	%
Republican	Paul Newton (incumbent)	69,932	57.71%
Democratic	Marcus J. Singleton	51,249	42.29%
Total votes		121,181	100%
Republican hold			

==== District 37 ====
Incumbent Democrat Jeff Jackson had represented the 37th district since 2014.

North Carolina Senate 37th district general election, 2020
Party	Candidate	Votes	%
Democratic	Jeff Jackson (incumbent)	64,562	54.99%
Republican	Sonja P. Nichols	48,507	41.32%
Libertarian	Jeff Scott	4,336	3.69%
Total votes		117,405	100%
Democratic hold			

==== District 38 ====
Incumbent Democrat Mujtaba Mohammed had represented the 38th district since 2019.

North Carolina Senate 38th district general election, 2020
Party	Candidate	Votes	%
Democratic	Mujtaba Mohammed (incumbent)	82,871	78.14%
Republican	Jack W. Brosch	23,187	21.86%
Total votes		106,058	100%
Democratic hold			

==== District 39 ====
Incumbent Republican Rob Bryan had represented the 39th district since his appointment on October 2, 2019. Bryan did not seek re-election, and Democrat DeAndrea Salvador won the open seat.

North Carolina Senate 39th district general election, 2020
Party	Candidate	Votes	%
Democratic	DeAndrea Salvador	68,752	62.18%
Republican	Joshua Niday	41,823	37.82%
Total votes		110,575	100%
Democratic gain from Republican			

==== District 40 ====
Incumbent Democrat Joyce Waddell had represented the 40th district since 2015.

North Carolina Senate 40th district general election, 2020
Party	Candidate	Votes	%
Democratic	Joyce Waddell (incumbent)	64,278	72.07%
Republican	Bobbie Shields	24,906	27.93%
Total votes		89,184	100%
Democratic hold			

==== District 41 ====
Incumbent Democrat Natasha Marcus had represented the 41st district since 2019.

North Carolina Senate 41st district general election, 2020
Party	Candidate	Votes	%
Democratic	Natasha Marcus (incumbent)	82,741	71.93%
Constitution	Christopher Cole	32,295	28.07%
Total votes		115,036	100%
Democratic hold			

==== District 42 ====
Incumbent Republican Andy Wells had represented the 42nd district since 2015. Wells ran unsuccessfully for lieutenant governor in the 2020 election, losing the Republican primary to Mark Robinson. Wells resigned before the end of his term, and Republican nominee Dean Proctor was appointed to the seat on August 18, 2020. Proctor was elected to a full term.

North Carolina Senate 42nd district general election, 2020
Party	Candidate	Votes	%
Republican	Dean Proctor (incumbent)	72,228	71.27%
Democratic	Tina R. Miles	29,111	28.73%
Total votes		101,339	100%
Republican hold			

==== District 43 ====
Incumbent Republican Kathy Harrington had represented the 43rd district since 2011.

North Carolina Senate 43rd district general election, 2020
Party	Candidate	Votes	%
Republican	Kathy Harrington (incumbent)	69,409	65.43%
Democratic	William Young	36,670	34.57%
Total votes		106,079	100%
Republican hold			

==== District 44 ====
Incumbent Republican Ted Alexander had represented the 44th district since 2019.

North Carolina Senate 44th district general election, 2020
Party	Candidate	Votes	%
Republican	Ted Alexander (incumbent)	73,513	70.78%
Democratic	David Lee Lattimore	30,354	29.22%
Total votes		103,867	100%
Republican hold			

==== District 45 ====
Incumbent Republican Deanna Ballard had represented the 45th district since 2016.

North Carolina Senate 45th district general election, 2020
Party	Candidate	Votes	%
Republican	Deanna Ballard (incumbent)	71,897	68.45%
Democratic	Jeanne Supin	33,139	31.55%
Total votes		105,036	100%
Republican hold			

==== District 46 ====
Incumbent Republican Warren Daniel had represented the 46th district and its predecessors since 2011.

North Carolina Senate 46th district general election, 2020
Party	Candidate	Votes	%
Republican	Warren Daniel (incumbent)	67,919	72.28%
Democratic	Edward Phifer	26,045	27.72%
Total votes		93,964	100%
Republican hold			

==== District 47 ====
Incumbent Republican Ralph Hise had represented the 47th district since 2011.

North Carolina Senate 47th district general election, 2020
Party	Candidate	Votes	%
Republican	Ralph Hise (incumbent)	68,440	68.44%
Democratic	David Brian Wheeler	31,554	31.56%
Total votes		99,997	100%
Republican hold			

==== District 48 ====
Incumbent Republican Chuck Edwards had represented the 48th district since 2016.

North Carolina Senate 48th district general election, 2020
Party	Candidate	Votes	%
Republican	Chuck Edwards (incumbent)	68,197	58.90%
Democratic	Brian Caskey	47,580	41.10%
Total votes		115,777	100%
Republican hold			

==== District 49 ====
Incumbent Democrat Terry Van Duyn had represented the 49th district since 2014. Van Duyn ran unsuccessfully for lieutenant governor in the 2020 election, losing the Democratic primary to Yvonne Lewis Holley. Democrat Julie Mayfield won the open seat.

North Carolina Senate 48th district general election, 2020
Party	Candidate	Votes	%
Democratic	Julie Mayfield	80,159	62.72%
Republican	Bob Penland	47,647	37.28%
Total votes		127,806	100%
Democratic hold			

==== District 50 ====
Incumbent Republican Jim Davis had represented the 50th district since 2011. Davis did not seek re-election, as he ran unsuccessfully for the U.S. House. State representative Kevin Corbin won the open seat.

North Carolina Senate 50th district general election, 2020
Party	Candidate	Votes	%
Republican	Kevin Corbin	73,875	66.66%
Democratic	Victoria Fox	36,954	33.34%
Total votes		110,829	100%
Republican hold			

== See also ==
- 2020 North Carolina elections
- List of North Carolina state legislatures
