= 2018 North Carolina Senate election =

- November 6, 2018

All 50 seats in the North Carolina State Senate
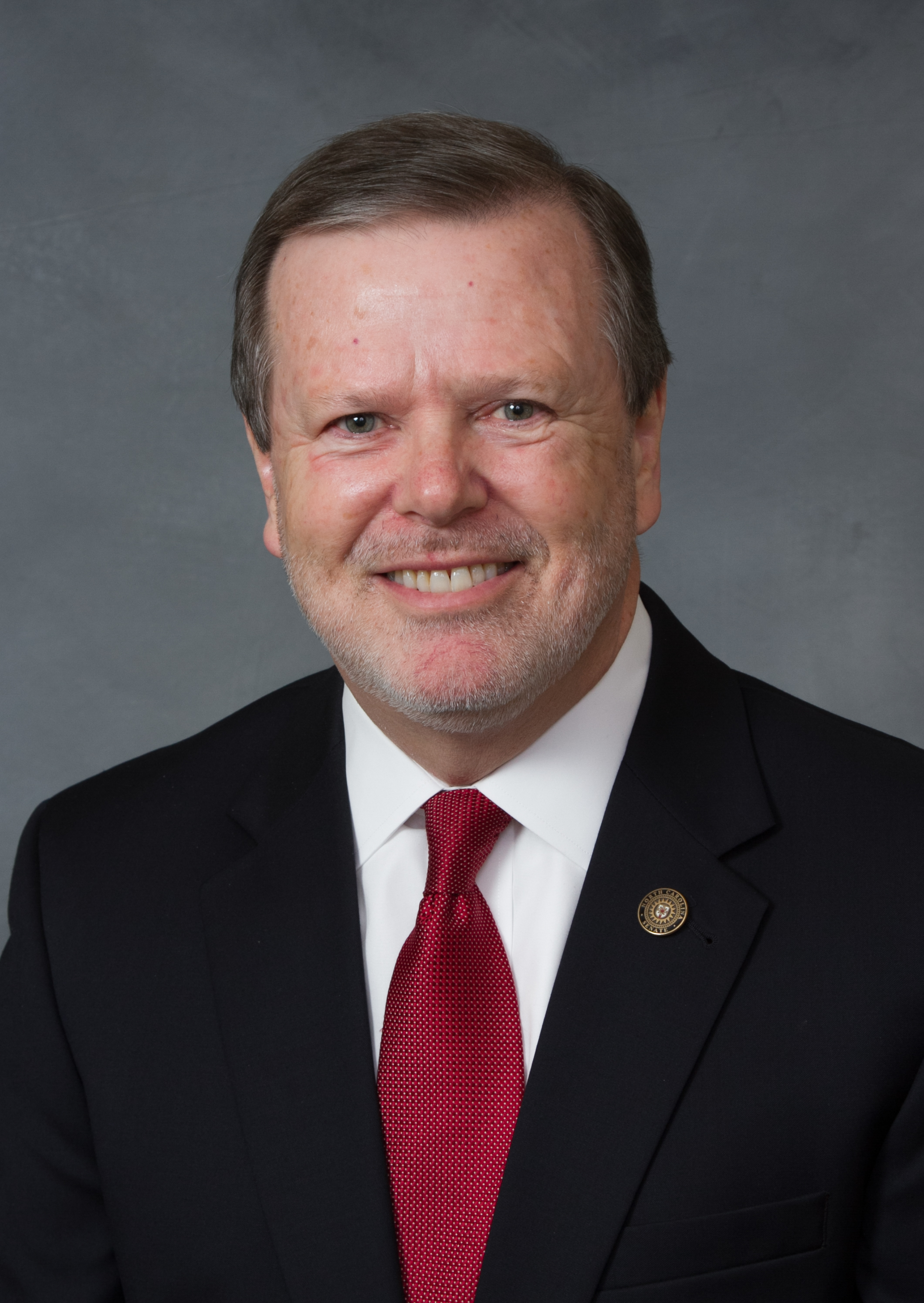

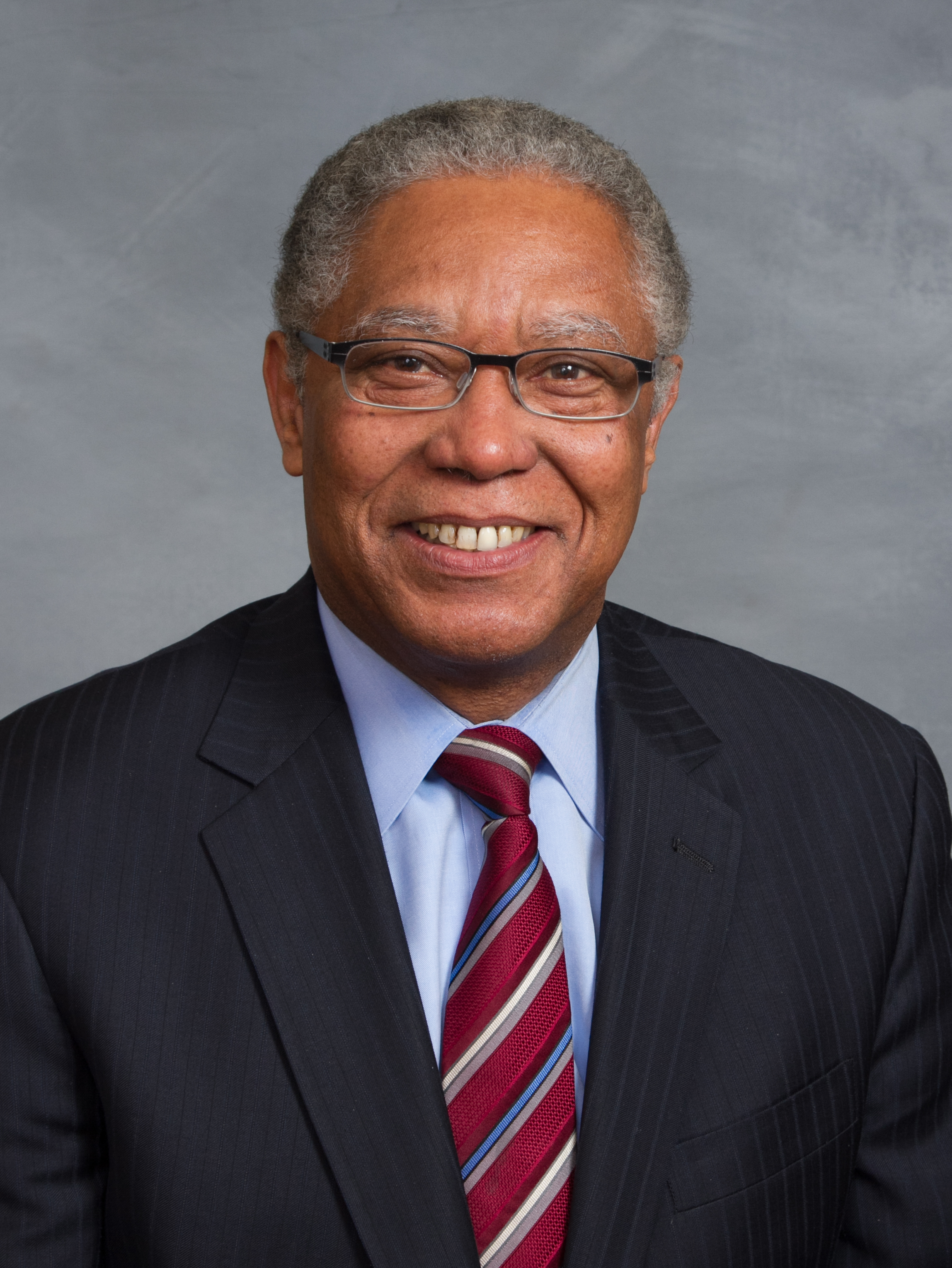
| | Majority party | Minority party |
|---|---|---|
| Leader | Phil Berger | Dan Blue |
| Party | Republican | Democratic |
| Leader since | January 1, 2005 | March 2, 2014 |
| Leader's seat | 30th - Eden | 14th - Raleigh |
| Last election | 35 | 15 |
| Seats after | 29 | 21 |
| Seat change | ▼6 | ▲6 |
| Popular vote | 1,816,854 | 1,856,838 |
| Percentage | 49.0% | 50.1% |
- Results: Democratic gain Democratic hold Republican hold Republicans: 50–60% 60–70% 70–80% 80–90% Democrats: 40–50% 50–60% 60–70% 70–80% 80–90%
President pro tempore before election
Phil Berger
Republican
President pro tempore-designate
Phil Berger
Republican

The 2018 North Carolina Senate elections elected 50 members to serve in the North Carolina Senate for a two-year term starting in January 2019. The Democratic Party gained six seats in this election, ending the Republican supermajority that they had held since 2011 in the state senate.

52.98% of registered voters cast ballots in this election, marking the highest turnout for a midterm election in North Carolina since 1990.

== Results summary ==
| District | Incumbent | Party | Elected | Party |
|---|---|---|---|---|
| 1st | New seat | | Bob Steinburg | Rep |
| 2nd | Norman Sanderson | Rep | Norman Sanderson | Rep |
| 3rd | Erica Smith | Dem | Erica Smith | Dem |
| 3rd | Bill Cook† (Note: Redistricted from the 3rd district.) | Rep | Erica Smith | Dem |
| 4th | Toby Fitch | Dem | Toby Fitch | Dem |
| 5th | Don Davis | Dem | Don Davis | Dem |
| 6th | Harry Brown | Rep | Harry Brown | Rep |
| 7th | Louis Pate | Rep | Louis Pate | Rep |
| 8th | Bill Rabon | Rep | Bill Rabon | Rep |
| 9th | Michael Lee | Rep | Harper Peterson | Dem |
| 10th | Brent Jackson | Rep | Brent Jackson | Rep |
| 11th | Rick Horner | Rep | Rick Horner | Rep |
| 12th | Ronald Rabin† | Rep | Jim Burgin | Rep |
| 13th | Danny Britt | Rep | Danny Britt | Rep |
| 14th | Dan Blue | Dem | Dan Blue | Dem |
| 15th | Jay Chaudhuri (Note: Redistricted from the 16th district.) | Dem | Jay Chaudhuri | Dem |
| 16th | New seat | | Wiley Nickel | Dem |
| 17th | Tamara Barringer | Rep | Sam Searcy | Dem |
| 18th | John Alexander (Note: Redistricted from the 15th district.) | Rep | John Alexander | Rep |
| 18th | Chad Barefoot† | Rep | John Alexander | Rep |
| 19th | Wesley Meredith | Rep | Kirk deViere | Dem |
| 20th | Floyd McKissick Jr. | Dem | Floyd McKissick Jr. | Dem |
| 21st | Ben Clark | Dem | Ben Clark | Dem |
| 22nd | Mike Woodard | Dem | Mike Woodard | Dem |
| 23rd | Valerie Foushee | Dem | Valerie Foushee | Dem |
| 24th | Rick Gunn | Rep | Rick Gunn | Rep |
| 25th | Tom McInnis | Rep | Tom McInnis | Rep |
| 26th | Jerry Tillman (Note: Redistricted from the 29th district.) | Rep | Jerry Tillman | Rep |
| 27th | Trudy Wade | Rep | Michael Garrett | Dem |
| 28th | Gladys Robinson | Dem | Gladys Robinson | Dem |
| 29th | Cathy Dunn† (Note: Redistricted from the 33rd district.) | Rep | Eddie Gallimore | Rep |
| 30th | Phil Berger (Note: Redistricted from the 26th district.) | Rep | Phil Berger | Rep |
| 31st | Joyce Krawiec | Rep | Joyce Krawiec | Rep |
| 31st | Dan Barrett (Note: Redistricted from the 34th district.) | Rep | Joyce Krawiec | Rep |
| 32nd | Paul Lowe Jr. | Dem | Paul Lowe Jr. | Dem |
| 33rd | New seat | | Carl Ford | Rep |
| 34th | New seat | | Vickie Sawyer | Rep |
| 35th | Tommy Tucker† | Rep | Todd Johnson | Rep |
| 36th | Paul Newton | Rep | Paul Newton | Rep |
| 37th | Jeff Jackson | Dem | Jeff Jackson | Dem |
| 38th | Joel Ford | Dem | Mujtaba Mohammed | Dem |
| 39th | Dan Bishop | Rep | Dan Bishop | Rep |
| 40th | Joyce Waddell | Dem | Joyce Waddell | Dem |
| 41st | Jeff Tarte | Rep | Natasha Marcus | Dem |
| 42nd | Andy Wells | Rep | Andy Wells | Rep |
| 43rd | Kathy Harrington | Rep | Kathy Harrington | Rep |
| 44th | David Curtis | Rep | Ted Alexander | Rep |
| 45th | Deanna Ballard | Rep | Deanna Ballard | Rep |
| 45th | Shirley Randleman (Note: Redistricted from the 30th district.) | Rep | Deanna Ballard | Rep |
| 46th | Warren Daniel | Rep | Warren Daniel | Rep |
| 47th | Ralph Hise | Rep | Ralph Hise | Rep |
| 48th | Chuck Edwards | Rep | Chuck Edwards | Rep |
| 49th | Terry Van Duyn | Dem | Terry Van Duyn | Dem |
| 50th | Jim Davis | Rep | Jim Davis | Rep |

† - Incumbent not seeking re-election

| Party | Candi- dates | Votes | | Seats | | |
| Party | Candi- dates | No. | % | No. | +/– | % |
|---|---|---|---|---|---|---|
| Republican | 50 | 1,816,854 | 48.995% | 29 | ▼6 | 58% |
| Democratic | 50 | 1,856,838 | 50.074% | 21 | ▲6 | 42% |
| Libertarian | 14 | 33,219 | 0.896% | 0 | Steady | 0% |
| Constitution | 1 | 1,301 | 0.035% | 0 | Steady | 0% |
| Total | 115 | 3,708,212 | 100% | 50 | Steady | 100% |

Senate seats
| Republican | 58% |
| Democratic | 42% |

Popular vote
| Democratic | 50.074% |
| Republican | 48.995% |
| Libertarian | 0.896% |
| Constitution | 0.035% |

=== Close races ===
Districts where the margin of victory was under 10%:

1. District 9, 0.27% (gain)
2. District 19, 0.74% (gain)
3. District 27, 1.04% (gain)
4. District 18, 2.55%
5. District 17, 4.25% (gain)
6. District 39, 5.78%
7. District 1, 6.42%
8. District 3, 7.72%
9. District 24, 7.72%
10. District 7, 7.8%

=== Incumbents defeated in primary election ===
- Shirley Randleman (R-District 30), lost a redistricting race to Deanna Ballard (R-District 45)
- Dan Barrett (R-District 34), lost a redistricting race to Joyce Krawiec (R-District 31)
- Joel Ford (D-District 38), defeated by Mujtaba Mohammed (D)
- David Curtis (R-District 44), defeated by Ted Alexander (R)

=== Incumbents defeated in general election ===
- Michael Lee (R-District 9), defeated by Harper Peterson (D)
- Tamara Barringer (R-District 17), defeated by Sam Searcy (D)
- Wesley Meredith (R-District 19), defeated by Kirk deViere (D)
- Trudy Wade (R-District 27), defeated by Michael Garrett (D)
- Jeff Tarte (R-District 41), defeated by Natasha Marcus (D)

=== Open seats that changed parties ===
- Jay Chaudhuri (D-District 16), instead ran in the 15th district, seat won by Wiley Nickel (D)

== Predictions ==
| Source | Ranking | As of |
|---|---|---|
| Governing | Likely R | October 8, 2018 |

== Detailed results ==
=== Districts 1–25 ===
==== District 1 ====
The new 1st district has no incumbent. Representative Bob Steinburg won the open seat.

North Carolina Senate 1st district Republican primary election, 2018
| Party | Candidate | Votes | % |
|---|---|---|---|
| Republican | Bob Steinburg | 6,785 | 58.04% |
| Republican | Clark Twiddy | 4,905 | 41.96% |
| Total votes | | 11,690 | 100% |

North Carolina Senate 1st district general election, 2018
| Party | Candidate | Votes | % |
|---|---|---|---|
| Republican | Bob Steinburg | 39,815 | 53.21% |
| Democratic | D. Cole Phelps | 35,017 | 46.79% |
| Total votes | | 74,832 | 100.00% |
| Republican win (new seat) | | | |

==== District 2 ====
Incumbent Republican Norman Sanderson had represented the 2nd district since 2013.

North Carolina Senate 2nd district Democratic primary election, 2018
| Party | Candidate | Votes | % |
|---|---|---|---|
| Democratic | Ginger Garner | 3,944 | 50.47% |
| Democratic | Dorothea D. White | 3,871 | 49.53% |
| Total votes | | 7,815 | 100% |

North Carolina Senate 2nd district Republican primary election, 2018
| Party | Candidate | Votes | % |
|---|---|---|---|
| Republican | Norman Sanderson (incumbent) | 11,293 | 76.29% |
| Republican | Lisa Oakley | 3,510 | 23.71% |
| Total votes | | 14,803 | 100% |

North Carolina Senate 2nd district general election, 2018
| Party | Candidate | Votes | % |
|---|---|---|---|
| Republican | Norman Sanderson (incumbent) | 42,898 | 61.78% |
| Democratic | Ginger Garner | 24,644 | 35.49% |
| Libertarian | Tim Harris | 1,894 | 2.73% |
| Total votes | | 69,436 | 100.00% |
| Republican hold | | | |

==== District 3 ====
The new 3rd district includes the home Incumbent Democrat Erica Smith, who had represented the 3rd district since 2015, and incumbent Republican Bill Cook had represented the 1st district since 2013. Cook didn't seek re-election while Smith was re-elected here.

North Carolina Senate 3rd district general election, 2018
| Party | Candidate | Votes | % |
|---|---|---|---|
| Democratic | Erica Smith (incumbent) | 33,942 | 53.86% |
| Republican | C. (Chuck) Earley Jr. | 29,082 | 46.14% |
| Total votes | | 63,024 | 100.00% |
| Democratic hold | | | |

==== District 4 ====
Incumbent Democrat Toby Fitch had represented the 4th district since 2018. Fitch won his first full term.

North Carolina Senate 4th district general election, 2018
| Party | Candidate | Votes | % |
|---|---|---|---|
| Democratic | Toby Fitch (incumbent) | 36,471 | 57.77% |
| Republican | Richard Scott | 25,391 | 40.22% |
| Libertarian | Jesse Shearin | 1,264 | 2.00% |
| Total votes | | 63,126 | 100.00% |
| Democratic hold | | | |

==== District 5 ====
Incumbent Democrat Don Davis had represented the 5th district since 2013 and previously from 2009 to 2011.

North Carolina Senate 5th district Democratic primary election, 2018
| Party | Candidate | Votes | % |
|---|---|---|---|
| Democratic | Don Davis (incumbent) | 11,011 | 77.35% |
| Democratic | Lonnie Carraway | 3,224 | 22.65% |
| Total votes | | 14,235 | 100% |

North Carolina Senate 5th district Republican primary election, 2018
| Party | Candidate | Votes | % |
|---|---|---|---|
| Republican | Kimberly Robb | 4,189 | 51.95% |
| Republican | Tony Moore | 3,875 | 48.05% |
| Total votes | | 8,064 | 100% |

North Carolina Senate 5th district general election, 2018
| Party | Candidate | Votes | % |
|---|---|---|---|
| Democratic | Don Davis (incumbent) | 36,321 | 55.34% |
| Republican | Kimberly Robb | 29,317 | 44.66% |
| Total votes | | 65,638 | 100.00% |
| Democratic hold | | | |

==== District 6 ====
Incumbent Republican Majority Leader Harry Brown had represented the 6th district since 2004. District 6 had the lowest number of votes cast in any district election in 2018.

North Carolina Senate 6th district general election, 2018
| Party | Candidate | Votes | % |
|---|---|---|---|
| Republican | Harry Brown (incumbent) | 27,228 | 65.07% |
| Democratic | Joseph (Joe) Webb | 14,615 | 34.93% |
| Total votes | | 41,843 | 100.00% |
| Republican hold | | | |

==== District 7 ====
Incumbent Republican Louis Pate had represented the 7th district and its predecessors since 2011.

North Carolina Senate 7th district general election, 2018
| Party | Candidate | Votes | % |
|---|---|---|---|
| Republican | Louis Pate (incumbent) | 30,329 | 53.90% |
| Democratic | David B. Brantley | 25,940 | 46.10% |
| Total votes | | 56,269 | 100.00% |
| Republican hold | | | |

==== District 8 ====
Incumbent Republican Bill Rabon had represented the 8th district since 2011.

North Carolina Senate 8th district Libertarian primary election, 2018
| Party | Candidate | Votes | % |
|---|---|---|---|
| Libertarian | Anthony H. Mascolo | 53 | 58.24% |
| Libertarian | Randolph W. "Randy" Crow | 38 | 41.76% |
| Total votes | | 91 | 100% |

North Carolina Senate 8th district general election, 2018
| Party | Candidate | Votes | % |
|---|---|---|---|
| Republican | Bill Rabon (incumbent) | 55,024 | 58.55% |
| Democratic | David W. Sink Jr. | 36,191 | 38.51% |
| Libertarian | Anthony H. Mascolo | 2,764 | 2.94% |
| Total votes | | 93,979 | 100.00% |
| Republican hold | | | |

==== District 9 ====
Incumbent Republican Michael Lee had represented the 9th district since 2014. Lee was defeated for re-election by Democrat Harper Peterson.

North Carolina Senate 9th district general election, 2018
| Party | Candidate | Votes | % |
|---|---|---|---|
| Democratic | Harper Peterson | 42,257 | 48.60% |
| Republican | Michael Lee (incumbent) | 42,026 | 48.33% |
| Libertarian | Ethan Bickley | 2,671 | 3.07% |
| Total votes | | 86,954 | 100.00% |
| Democratic gain from Republican | | | |

==== District 10 ====
Incumbent Republican Brent Jackson had represented the 10th district since 2011.

North Carolina Senate 10th district general election, 2018
| Party | Candidate | Votes | % |
|---|---|---|---|
| Republican | Brent Jackson (incumbent) | 33,366 | 62.46% |
| Democratic | Vernon R. Moore | 20,057 | 37.54% |
| Total votes | | 53,423 | 100.00% |
| Republican hold | | | |

==== District 11 ====
Incumbent Republican Rick Horner had represented the 11th district since 2017.

North Carolina Senate 11th district general election, 2018
| Party | Candidate | Votes | % |
|---|---|---|---|
| Republican | Rick Horner (incumbent) | 45,768 | 56.49% |
| Democratic | Albert R. Pacer | 35,258 | 43.51% |
| Total votes | | 81,026 | 100.00% |
| Republican hold | | | |

==== District 12 ====
Incumbent Republican Ronald Rabin had represented the 12th district since 2013. Rabin did not seek re-election. Republican Jim Burgin won the open seat.

North Carolina Senate 12th district general election, 2018
| Party | Candidate | Votes | % |
|---|---|---|---|
| Republican | Jim Burgin | 34,931 | 60.00% |
| Democratic | Jean Sivoli | 23,290 | 40.00% |
| Total votes | | 58,221 | 100.00% |
| Republican hold | | | |

==== District 13 ====
Incumbent Republican Danny Britt had represented the 13th district since 2017.

North Carolina Senate 13th district Democratic primary election, 2018
| Party | Candidate | Votes | % |
|---|---|---|---|
| Democratic | John Campbell | 14,803 | 69.20% |
| Democratic | Bobbie Jacobs-Ghaffar | 6,588 | 30.80% |
| Total votes | | 21,391 | 100% |

North Carolina Senate 13th district general election, 2018
| Party | Candidate | Votes | % |
|---|---|---|---|
| Republican | Danny Britt (incumbent) | 31,106 | 62.50% |
| Democratic | John Campbell | 18,661 | 37.50% |
| Total votes | | 49,767 | 100.00% |
| Republican hold | | | |

==== District 14 ====
Incumbent Democrat Dan Blue had represented the 14th district since 2009.

North Carolina Senate 14th district general election, 2018
| Party | Candidate | Votes | % |
|---|---|---|---|
| Democratic | Dan Blue (incumbent) | 55,035 | 71.36% |
| Republican | Sandy Andrews | 19,951 | 25.87% |
| Libertarian | Richard Haygood | 2,138 | 2.77% |
| Total votes | | 77,124 | 100.00% |
| Democratic hold | | | |

==== District 15 ====
Following redistricting, the old 16th district became the new 15th district. Incumbent Democrat Jay Chaudhuri who had represented the 16th district since 2016, successfully sought re-election. Brian Lewis won the highest percentage vote of any Libertarian State Senate candidate in 2018, with 3.61%.

North Carolina Senate 15th district general election, 2018
| Party | Candidate | Votes | % |
|---|---|---|---|
| Democratic | Jay Chaudhuri (incumbent) | 60,805 | 73.10% |
| Republican | Alan David Michael | 19,365 | 23.28% |
| Libertarian | Brian Lewis | 3,005 | 3.61% |
| Total votes | | 83,175 | 100.00% |
| Democratic hold | | | |

==== District 16 ====
Following redistricting, the new 16th district is an open seat which is expected to favor Democrats. Brian Irving won the highest number of votes of any Libertarian State Senate candidate in 2018 with 3,382 votes.

North Carolina Senate 16th district Democratic primary election, 2018
| Party | Candidate | Votes | % |
|---|---|---|---|
| Democratic | Wiley Nickel | 8,585 | 55.48% |
| Democratic | Luis Toledo | 6,890 | 44.52% |
| Total votes | | 15,475 | 100% |

North Carolina Senate 16th district general election, 2018
| Party | Candidate | Votes | % |
|---|---|---|---|
| Democratic | Wiley Nickel | 63,335 | 65.28% |
| Republican | Paul Smith | 30,308 | 31.24% |
| Libertarian | Brian Irving | 3,382 | 3.49% |
| Total votes | | 97,025 | 100.00% |
| Democratic win (new seat) | | | |

==== District 17 ====
Incumbent Republican Tamara Barringer had represented the 17th district since 2013. Following redistricting, this seat was made more competitive. Barringer lost re-election to Democrat Sam Searcy.

North Carolina Senate 17th district general election, 2018
| Party | Candidate | Votes | % |
|---|---|---|---|
| Democratic | Sam Searcy | 50,040 | 50.60% |
| Republican | Tamara Barringer (incumbent) | 45,841 | 46.35% |
| Libertarian | Bruce Basson | 3,016 | 3.05% |
| Total votes | | 98,897 | 100.00% |
| Democratic gain from Republican | | | |

==== District 18 ====
Following redistricting, Incumbent Republicans Chad Barefoot and John Alexander had their homes both drawn into the new 18th district. The new 18th district, unlike the former 15th and 18th districts, is a competitive district which isn't safe for either party. Chad Barefoot retired, while John Alexander narrowly won re-election. The election in District 18 had the highest number of votes cast of any district election in the 2018 elections.

North Carolina Senate 18th district general election, 2018
| Party | Candidate | Votes | % |
|---|---|---|---|
| Republican | John Alexander (incumbent) | 51,794 | 49.90% |
| Democratic | Mack Paul | 49,155 | 47.35% |
| Libertarian | Brad Hessel | 2,855 | 2.75% |
| Total votes | | 103,804 | 100.00% |
| Republican hold | | | |

==== District 19 ====
Incumbent Republican Wesley Meredith had represented the 19th district since 2011. Meredith lost re-election to Democrat Kirk deViere.

North Carolina Senate 19th district Democratic primary election, 2018
| Party | Candidate | Votes | % |
|---|---|---|---|
| Democratic | Kirk deViere | 5,257 | 62.59% |
| Democratic | Clarence E. Donaldson | 3,142 | 37.41% |
| Total votes | | 8,399 | 100% |

North Carolina Senate 19th district general election, 2018
| Party | Candidate | Votes | % |
|---|---|---|---|
| Democratic | Kirk deViere | 29,815 | 50.37% |
| Republican | Wesley Meredith (incumbent) | 29,382 | 49.63% |
| Total votes | | 59,197 | 100.00% |
| Democratic gain from Republican | | | |

==== District 20 ====
Incumbent Democrat Floyd McKissick Jr. had represented the 20th district since 2007.

North Carolina Senate 20th district general election, 2018
| Party | Candidate | Votes | % |
|---|---|---|---|
| Democratic | Floyd McKissick Jr. (incumbent) | 74,205 | 83.52% |
| Republican | Tom Stark | 12,309 | 13.85% |
| Libertarian | Jared Erickson | 2,331 | 2.62% |
| Total votes | | 88,845 | 100.00% |
| Democratic hold | | | |

==== District 21 ====
Incumbent Democrat Ben Clark had represented the 21st district since 2013.

North Carolina Senate 21st district Democratic primary election, 2018
| Party | Candidate | Votes | % |
|---|---|---|---|
| Democratic | Ben Clark (incumbent) | 6,491 | 55.63% |
| Democratic | Naveed Aziz | 5,177 | 44.37% |
| Total votes | | 11,668 | 100% |

North Carolina Senate 21st district general election, 2018
| Party | Candidate | Votes | % |
|---|---|---|---|
| Democratic | Ben Clark (incumbent) | 33,238 | 70.94% |
| Republican | Timothy Leever | 13,616 | 29.06% |
| Total votes | | 46,854 | 100.00% |
| Democratic hold | | | |

==== District 22 ====
Incumbent Democrat Mike Woodard had represented the 22nd district since 2013.

North Carolina Senate 22nd district general election, 2018
| Party | Candidate | Votes | % |
|---|---|---|---|
| Democratic | Mike Woodard (incumbent) | 46,153 | 61.81% |
| Republican | Rickey (Rick) Padgett | 26,989 | 36.14% |
| Libertarian | Ray Ubinger | 1,527 | 2.05% |
| Total votes | | 74,669 | 100.00% |
| Democratic hold | | | |

==== District 23 ====
Incumbent Democrat Valerie Foushee had represented the 23rd district since 2013.

North Carolina Senate 23rd district general election, 2018
| Party | Candidate | Votes | % |
|---|---|---|---|
| Democratic | Valerie Foushee (incumbent) | 73,332 | 71.29% |
| Republican | Tom Glendinning | 29,530 | 28.71% |
| Total votes | | 102,862 | 100.00% |
| Democratic hold | | | |

==== District 24 ====
Incumbent Republican Rick Gunn had represented the 24th district since 2011.

North Carolina Senate 24th district general election, 2018
| Party | Candidate | Votes | % |
|---|---|---|---|
| Republican | Rick Gunn (incumbent) | 42,324 | 53.86% |
| Democratic | J. D. Wooten | 36,255 | 46.14% |
| Total votes | | 78,579 | 100.00% |
| Republican hold | | | |

==== District 25 ====
Incumbent Republican Tom McInnis had represented the 25th district since 2015.

North Carolina Senate 25th district Republican primary election, 2018
| Party | Candidate | Votes | % |
|---|---|---|---|
| Republican | Tom McInnis (incumbent)) | 8,911 | 60.98% |
| Republican | Michelle Lexo | 5,701 | 39.02% |
| Total votes | | 14,612 | 100% |

North Carolina Senate 25th district general election, 2018
| Party | Candidate | Votes | % |
|---|---|---|---|
| Republican | Tom McInnis (incumbent) | 41,601 | 57.09% |
| Democratic | Helen Probst Mills | 31,268 | 42.91% |
| Total votes | | 72,869 | 100.00% |
| Republican hold | | | |

=== Districts 26–50 ===
==== District 26 ====
Following redistricting, the old 29th district became the new 26th district. Incumbent Republican Jerry Tillman, who had represented the 29th district since 2003, successfully sought re-election here.

North Carolina Senate 26th district general election, 2018
| Party | Candidate | Votes | % |
|---|---|---|---|
| Republican | Jerry Tillman (incumbent) | 39,103 | 64.83% |
| Democratic | William (Bill) McCaskill | 21,217 | 35.17% |
| Total votes | | 60,320 | 100.00% |
| Republican hold | | | |

==== District 27 ====
Incumbent Republican Trudy Wade had represented the 27th district since 2013. Wade lost re-election to Democrat Michael Garrett.

North Carolina Senate 27th district general election, 2018
| Party | Candidate | Votes | % |
|---|---|---|---|
| Democratic | Michael Garrett | 45,205 | 50.52% |
| Republican | Trudy Wade (incumbent) | 44,268 | 49.48% |
| Total votes | | 89,473 | 100.00% |
| Democratic gain from Republican | | | |

==== District 28 ====
Incumbent Democrat Gladys Robinson had represented the 28th district since 2011. This district had the largest margin of any district election in 2018.

North Carolina Senate 28th District general election, 2018
| Party | Candidate | Votes | % |
|---|---|---|---|
| Democratic | Gladys Robinson (incumbent) | 56,262 | 75.25% |
| Republican | Clark Porter | 18,509 | 24.75% |
| Total votes | | 74,771 | 100.00% |
| Democratic hold | | | |

==== District 29 ====
Following redistricting, the new 29th district overlaps with much of the former 33rd district. Incumbent Republican Cathy Dunn, who had represented the 33rd district since 2017, did not seek re-election. Eddie Gallimore defeated representative Sam Watford to win the Republican nomination, and easily won the general election.

North Carolina Senate 29th district Republican primary election, 2018
| Party | Candidate | Votes | % |
|---|---|---|---|
| Republican | Eddie Gallimore | 11,775 | 55.48% |
| Republican | Sam Watford | 9,448 | 44.52% |
| Total votes | | 21,223 | 100% |

North Carolina Senate 29th district general election, 2018
| Party | Candidate | Votes | % |
|---|---|---|---|
| Republican | Eddie Gallimore | 46,974 | 71.64% |
| Democratic | Cheraton Love | 18,594 | 28.36% |
| Total votes | | 65,568 | 100.00% |
| Republican hold | | | |

==== District 30 ====
Following redistricting, most of the old 26th district became the new 30th district. Incumbent Republican president pro tempore Phil Berger, who had represented the 26th district and its predecessors since 2001, successfully sought re-election here.

North Carolina Senate 30th district general election, 2018
| Party | Candidate | Votes | % |
|---|---|---|---|
| Republican | Phil Berger (incumbent) | 43,132 | 62.63% |
| Democratic | Jen Mangrum | 23,558 | 34.21% |
| Libertarian | R. Michael Jordan | 2,182 | 3.17% |
| Total votes | | 68,872 | 100.00% |
| Republican hold | | | |

==== District 31 ====
Incumbent Republicans Joyce Krawiec, who had represented the 31st district since 2014, and Dan Barrett, who had represented the 34th district since his appointment in August 2017, sought re-election here. Krawiec narrowly defeated Barrett in the Republican primary, and easily won the general election.

North Carolina Senate 31st district Republican primary election, 2018
| Party | Candidate | Votes | % |
|---|---|---|---|
| Republican | Joyce Krawiec (incumbent) | 6,436 | 48.64% |
| Republican | Dan Barrett (incumbent) | 6,204 | 46.88% |
| Republican | Peter Antinozzi | 593 | 4.48% |
| Total votes | | 13,233 | 100% |

North Carolina Senate 31st district general election, 2018
| Party | Candidate | Votes | % |
|---|---|---|---|
| Republican | Joyce Krawiec (incumbent) | 54,267 | 61.00% |
| Democratic | John Motsinger Jr. | 34,693 | 39.00% |
| Total votes | | 88,960 | 100.00% |
| Republican hold | | | |

==== District 32 ====
Incumbent Democrat Paul Lowe Jr. had represented the 32nd district since 2015.

North Carolina Senate 32nd district general election, 2018
| Party | Candidate | Votes | % |
|---|---|---|---|
| Democratic | Paul Lowe Jr. (incumbent) | 47,221 | 72.88% |
| Republican | Eric Henderson | 17,572 | 27.12% |
| Total votes | | 64,793 | 100.00% |
| Democratic hold | | | |

==== District 33 ====
After redistricting, the old 33rd district became the new 29th district, and a new 33rd district was created. The new district includes Rowan County and Stanly County. State representative Carl Ford was the Republican nominee.

North Carolina Senate 33rd district Republican primary election, 2018
| Party | Candidate | Votes | % |
|---|---|---|---|
| Republican | Carl Ford | 8,418 | 60.04% |
| Republican | Bill Sorenson | 5,602 | 39.96% |
| Total votes | | 14,020 | 100% |

North Carolina Senate 33rd district general election, 2018
| Party | Candidate | Votes | % |
|---|---|---|---|
| Republican | Carl Ford | 47,473 | 68.18% |
| Democratic | Arin Wilhelm | 22,154 | 31.82% |
| Total votes | | 69,627 | 100.00% |
| Republican win (new seat) | | | |

==== District 34 ====
Incumbent Republican Dan Barrett had represented the 34th district since his appointment in August 2017. Barrett chose to seek re-election in the 31st district after his home in Davie County was drawn into that district. The new 34th district includes Iredell and Yadkin counties, and was expected to favor Republicans. Republican Vickie Sawyer was elected to a full term here, though after already winning the GOP primary for this seat, she had been appointed to serve the balance of David Curtis's term in the 44th district.

North Carolina Senate 34th district Democratic primary election, 2018
| Party | Candidate | Votes | % |
|---|---|---|---|
| Democratic | Beniah McMiller | 1,483 | 43.46% |
| Democratic | William Stinson | 1,271 | 37.25% |
| Democratic | Lisaney Kong | 658 | 19.28% |
| Total votes | | 3,412 | 100% |

North Carolina Senate 34th district Republican primary election, 2018
| Party | Candidate | Votes | % |
|---|---|---|---|
| Republican | Vickie Sawyer | 4,800 | 43.83% |
| Republican | Bob Rucho | 3,636 | 33.20% |
| Republican | A. J. Daoud | 1,519 | 13.87% |
| Republican | William "Bill" Howell | 996 | 9.10% |
| Total votes | | 10,951 | 100% |

North Carolina Senate 34th district general election, 2018
| Party | Candidate | Votes | % |
|---|---|---|---|
| Republican | Vickie Sawyer | 54,635 | 69.73% |
| Democratic | Beniah McMiller | 23,716 | 30.27% |
| Total votes | | 78,351 | 100.00% |
| Republican win (new seat) | | | |

==== District 35 ====
Incumbent Republican Tommy Tucker had represented the 35th district since 2011. Tucker did not seek re-election.

North Carolina Senate 35th district general election, 2018
| Party | Candidate | Votes | % |
|---|---|---|---|
| Republican | Todd Johnson | 49,848 | 61.51% |
| Democratic | Caroline L. Walker | 31,188 | 38.49% |
| Total votes | | 81,036 | 100.00% |
| Republican hold | | | |

==== District 36 ====
Incumbent Republican Paul Newton had represented the 36th district since 2017.

North Carolina Senate 36th district general election, 2018
| Party | Candidate | Votes | % |
|---|---|---|---|
| Republican | Paul Newton (incumbent) | 44,938 | 56.63% |
| Democratic | Mark E. Shelley | 34,416 | 43.37% |
| Total votes | | 79,354 | 100.00% |
| Republican hold | | | |

==== District 37 ====
Incumbent Democrat Jeff Jackson had represented the 37th district since 2014.

North Carolina Senate 37th district general election, 2018
| Party | Candidate | Votes | % |
|---|---|---|---|
| Democratic | Jeff Jackson (incumbent) | 52,261 | 78.05% |
| Republican | Nora Trotman | 13,395 | 20.01% |
| Constitution | Stuart Andrew Collins | 1,301 | 1.94% |
| Total votes | | 66,957 | 100.00% |
| Democratic hold | | | |

==== District 38 ====
Incumbent Democrat Joel Ford had represented the 38th district since 2013. Ford lost the Democratic primary to Mujtaba Mohammed, who easily won the general election.

North Carolina Senate 38th district Democratic primary election, 2018
| Party | Candidate | Votes | % |
|---|---|---|---|
| Democratic | Mujtaba Mohammed | 6,899 | 51.93% |
| Democratic | Joel Ford (incumbent) | 5,408 | 40.71% |
| Democratic | Roderick Davis | 631 | 4.75% |
| Democratic | Tim Wallis | 346 | 2.60% |
| Total votes | | 13,284 | 100% |

North Carolina Senate 38th district general election, 2018
| Party | Candidate | Votes | % |
|---|---|---|---|
| Democratic | Mujtaba Mohammed | 53,563 | 81.73% |
| Republican | Richard Rivette | 11,972 | 18.27% |
| Total votes | | 65,535 | 100.00% |
| Democratic hold | | | |

==== District 39 ====
Incumbent Republican Dan Bishop had represented the 39th district since 2017.

North Carolina Senate 39th district Democratic primary election, 2018
| Party | Candidate | Votes | % |
|---|---|---|---|
| Democratic | Chad Stachowicz | 5,239 | 50.08% |
| Democratic | Ann Harlan | 5,222 | 49.92% |
| Total votes | | 10,461 | 100% |

North Carolina Senate 39th district Republican primary election, 2018
| Party | Candidate | Votes | % |
|---|---|---|---|
| Republican | Dan Bishop (incumbent) | 8,778 | 71.28% |
| Republican | Beth Monaghan | 3,537 | 28.72% |
| Total votes | | 12,315 | 100% |

North Carolina Senate 39th district general election, 2018
| Party | Candidate | Votes | % |
|---|---|---|---|
| Republican | Dan Bishop (incumbent) | 49,698 | 52.89% |
| Democratic | Chad Stachowicz | 44,273 | 47.11% |
| Total votes | | 93,971 | 100.00% |
| Republican hold | | | |

==== District 40 ====
Incumbent Democrat Joyce Waddell had represented the 40th district since 2015.

North Carolina Senate 40th district general election, 2018
| Party | Candidate | Votes | % |
|---|---|---|---|
| Democratic | Joyce Waddell (incumbent) | 44,773 | 75.63% |
| Republican | Mr. Bobbie Shields | 14,426 | 24.37% |
| Total votes | | 59,199 | 100.00% |
| Democratic hold | | | |

==== District 41 ====
Incumbent Republican Jeff Tarte had represented the 41st district since 2013. Tarte lost re-election to Democrat Natasha Marcus.

North Carolina Senate 41st district general election, 2018
| Party | Candidate | Votes | % |
|---|---|---|---|
| Democratic | Natasha Marcus | 49,459 | 56.85% |
| Republican | Jeff Tarte (incumbent) | 37,536 | 43.15% |
| Total votes | | 86,995 | 100.00% |
| Democratic gain from Republican | | | |

==== District 42 ====
Incumbent Republican Andy Wells had represented the 42nd district since 2015.

North Carolina Senate 42nd district Republican primary election, 2018
| Party | Candidate | Votes | % |
|---|---|---|---|
| Republican | Andy Wells (incumbent) | 9,018 | 47.46% |
| Republican | Mark Hollo | 6,506 | 34.24% |
| Republican | Ryan Huffman | 2,236 | 11.77% |
| Republican | Dustin Long | 1,241 | 6.53% |
| Total votes | | 19,001 | 100% |

North Carolina Senate 42nd district general election, 2018
| Party | Candidate | Votes | % |
|---|---|---|---|
| Republican | Andy Wells (incumbent) | 44,323 | 66.31% |
| Democratic | Ric Vandett | 22,522 | 33.69% |
| Total votes | | 66,845 | 100.00% |
| Republican hold | | | |

==== District 43 ====
Incumbent Republican Kathy Harrington had represented the 43rd district since 2011.

North Carolina Senate 43rd district general election, 2018
| Party | Candidate | Votes | % |
|---|---|---|---|
| Republican | Kathy Harrington (incumbent) | 42,906 | 63.39% |
| Democratic | Altriese Price | 22,881 | 33.80% |
| Libertarian | Mitchell D. Bridges | 1,900 | 2.81% |
| Total votes | | 67,687 | 100.00% |
| Republican hold | | | |

==== District 44 ====
Incumbent Republican David Curtis had represented the 44th district since 2013. Curtis lost re-nomination to fellow Republican Ted Alexander. Curtis resigned before the end of his term, and Vickie Sawyer was appointed to replace him. Alexander easily won the open seat here, while Sawyer was simultaneously elected to the newly created 34th district which contained her home.

North Carolina Senate 44th district Republican primary election, 2018
| Party | Candidate | Votes | % |
|---|---|---|---|
| Republican | Ted Alexander | 5,523 | 44.37% |
| Republican | David Curtis (incumbent) | 4,554 | 36.59% |
| Republican | Martin Oakes | 2,370 | 19.04% |
| Total votes | | 12,447 | 100% |

North Carolina Senate 44th district general election, 2018
| Party | Candidate | Votes | % |
|---|---|---|---|
| Republican | Ted Alexander | 46,861 | 68.85% |
| Democratic | David Lee Lattimore | 21,204 | 31.15% |
| Total votes | | 68,065 | 100.00% |
| Republican hold | | | |

==== District 45 ====
Following redistricting, incumbent Republicans Deanna Ballard and Shirley Randleman had both of their homes drawn into the 45th district. The district was more Ballard's district than Randleman's, and Ballard defeated Randleman in the Republican primary. Ballard easily won the general election.

North Carolina Senate 45th district Republican primary election, 2018
| Party | Candidate | Votes | % |
|---|---|---|---|
| Republican | Deanna Ballard (incumbent) | 8,403 | 53.59% |
| Republican | Shirley Randleman (incumbent) | 7,276 | 46.41% |
| Total votes | | 15,679 | 100% |

North Carolina Senate 45th district general election, 2018
| Party | Candidate | Votes | % |
|---|---|---|---|
| Republican | Deanna Ballard (incumbent) | 48,998 | 65.08% |
| Democratic | Wes Luther | 26,293 | 34.92% |
| Total votes | | 75,291 | 100.00% |
| Republican hold | | | |

==== District 46 ====
Incumbent Republican Warren Daniel had represented the 46th district and its predecessors since 2011.

North Carolina Senate 46th district general election, 2018
| Party | Candidate | Votes | % |
|---|---|---|---|
| Republican | Warren Daniel (incumbent) | 42,445 | 69.97% |
| Democratic | Art Sherwood | 18,218 | 30.03% |
| Total votes | | 60,663 | 100.00% |
| Republican hold | | | |

==== District 47 ====
Incumbent Republican Ralph Hise had represented the 47th district since 2011.

North Carolina Senate 47th district Democratic primary election, 2018
| Party | Candidate | Votes | % |
|---|---|---|---|
| Democratic | David Wheeler | 4,272 | 54.17% |
| Democratic | Cheryl D. Swofford | 2,473 | 31.36% |
| Democratic | Christopher H. Rumfelt | 1,141 | 14.47% |
| Total votes | | 7,886 | 100% |

North Carolina Senate 47th district general election, 2018
| Party | Candidate | Votes | % |
|---|---|---|---|
| Republican | Ralph Hise (incumbent) | 44,305 | 62.33% |
| Democratic | David Wheeler | 26,777 | 37.67% |
| Total votes | | 71,082 | 100.00% |
| Republican hold | | | |

==== District 48 ====
Incumbent Republican Chuck Edwards had represented the 48th district since 2016.

North Carolina Senate 48th district general election, 2018
| Party | Candidate | Votes | % |
|---|---|---|---|
| Republican | Chuck Edwards (incumbent) | 49,073 | 56.26% |
| Democratic | Norm Bossert | 38,147 | 43.74% |
| Total votes | | 87,220 | 100.00% |
| Republican hold | | | |

==== District 49 ====
Incumbent Democrat Terry Van Duyn had represented the 49th district since 2014.

North Carolina Senate 49th district general election, 2018
| Party | Candidate | Votes | % |
|---|---|---|---|
| Democratic | Terry Van Duyn (incumbent) | 61,092 | 63.70% |
| Republican | Mark Crawford | 32,519 | 33.91% |
| Libertarian | Lyndon John Smith | 2,290 | 2.39% |
| Total votes | | 95,901 | 100.00% |
| Democratic hold | | | |

==== District 50 ====
Incumbent Republican Jim Davis had represented the 50th district since 2011.

North Carolina Senate 50th district general election, 2018
| Party | Candidate | Votes | % |
|---|---|---|---|
| Republican | Jim Davis (incumbent) | 48,387 | 60.30% |
| Democratic | Bobby Kuppers | 31,851 | 39.70% |
| Total votes | | 80,238 | 100.00% |
| Republican hold | | | |

== See also ==
- List of North Carolina state legislatures
