= Val Applewhite =

American politician

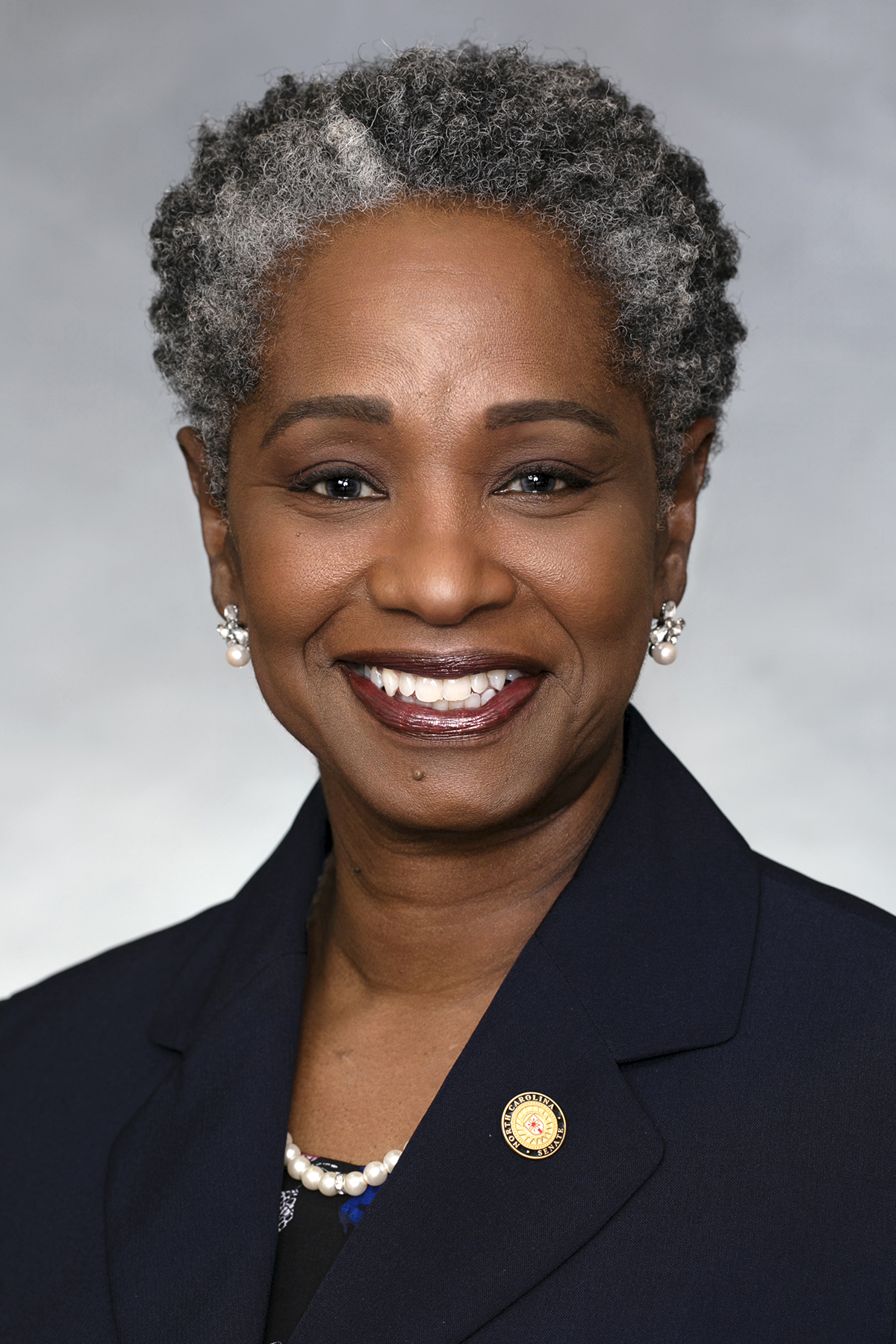

Member of the North Carolina Senate from the 19th district
- Incumbent
- Assumed office January 1, 2023
- Preceded by: Kirk deViere

Personal details
- Born: 1960 or 1961 (age 65–66)
- Party: Democratic
- Education: Southern New Hampshire University; Strayer University
- Website: Official Website

Val Applewhite (born 1960 or 1961) is an American politician who has served as a member of the North Carolina Senate since January 1, 2023. A Democrat from Fayetteville, she represents the 19th district. She was first elected to the Senate in 2022, defeating incumbent Senator Kirk deViere in the Democratic primary. Applewhite is a retired United States Air Force veteran. She is a graduate of Southern New Hampshire University and Strayer University.

== Political career ==
Applewhite was an unsuccessful candidate in the 2013 and 2015 Fayetteville, North Carolina mayoral elections.

She ran for the North Carolina Senate in 2022, challenging incumbent Democratic Senator Kirk deViere. She defeated him in the primary after receiving an endorsement from Roy Cooper, who was at the time the incumbent governor of the state. She defeated former state Senator Wesley Meredith in the general election, and was reelected in 2024.

Applewhite sponsored several bills in her first term to provide clean water for residents of Fayetteville. She opposes school vouchers and supports abortion rights, voting against North Carolina's 12-week ban. She has described herself as an "advocate for health care" and supports expanding Medicaid. A breast cancer survivor, she supported a bill by Senate Democratic Leader Sydney Batch to improve health coverage for detecting breast cancer.

In 2023, she was the only Democrat in the Senate to vote for a party-line bill, the Fairness in Women's Sports Act, that would prevent transgender women from playing in women's sports. She reported receiving "frightening" messages as a result of this vote.

== Electoral history ==
=== 2024 ===
North Carolina Senate 19th district general election, 2024
Party	Candidate	Votes	%
Democratic	Val Applewhite (incumbent)	55,697	62.87%
Republican	Semone Pemberton	30,005	33.87%
Libertarian	Steven Swinton	2,884	3.26%
Total votes		88,586	100%
Democratic hold			

=== 2022 ===
North Carolina Senate 19th district Democratic primary election, 2022
Party	Candidate	Votes	%
Democratic	Val Applewhite	7,588	56.24%
Democratic	Kirk deViere (incumbent)	4,972	36.85%
Democratic	Ed Donaldson	931	6.90%
Total votes		13,491	100%

North Carolina Senate 19th district general election, 2022
Party	Candidate	Votes	%
Democratic	Val Applewhite	30,755	52.70%
Republican	Wesley Meredith	27,601	47.30%
Total votes		58,356	100%
Democratic hold			

=== 2015 ===
Fayetteville mayoral primary election, 2015
Party	Candidate	Votes	%
Nonpartisan	Nat Robertson (incumbent)	4,333	52.43%
Nonpartisan	Val Applewhite	3,748	45.35%
Nonpartisan	Edward Donovan	184	2.23%
Total votes		8,265	100%

Fayetteville mayoral general election, 2015
Party	Candidate	Votes	%
Nonpartisan	Nat Robertson (incumbent)	9,273	51.81%
Nonpartisan	Val Applewhite	8,604	48.07%
Write-in		21	0.12%
Total votes		17,898	100%

=== 2013 ===
Fayetteville mayoral primary election, 2013
Party	Candidate	Votes	%
Nonpartisan	Val Applewhite	5,416	43.93%
Nonpartisan	Nat Robertson	3,809	30.89%
Nonpartisan	Kirk deViere	2,468	20.02%
Nonpartisan	Paul A. Williams	517	4.19%
Nonpartisan	Charles Ragan	119	0.97%
Total votes		12,329	100%

Fayetteville mayoral general election, 2013
Party	Candidate	Votes	%
Nonpartisan	Nat Robertson	11,591	50.49%
Nonpartisan	Val Applewhite	11,331	49.36%
Write-in		34	0.15%
Total votes		22,956	100%
