= 2025 Fayetteville, North Carolina mayoral election =

2025 Fayetteville mayoral election
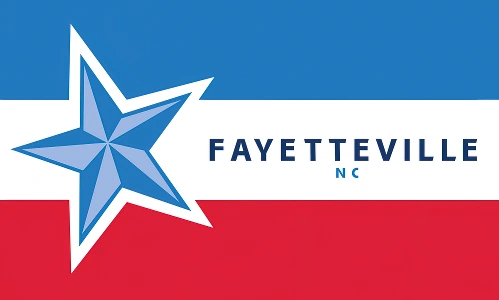
- November 4, 2025

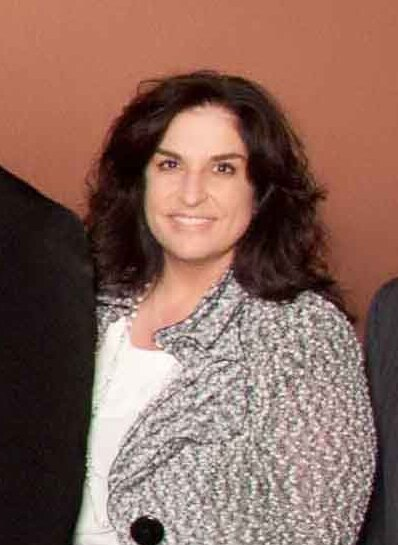
Candidate	Mitch Colvin	Kathy Jensen
Party	Nonpartisan	Nonpartisan
Popular vote	12,436	7,855
Percentage	60.05%	37.93%
Mayor before election
Mitch Colvin
Elected mayor
Mitch Colvin

The 2025 Fayetteville mayoral election was held on November 4, 2025, to elect the mayor of Fayetteville, North Carolina. The nonpartisan blanket primary was held on October 7, with incumbent mayor Mitch Colvin advancing to the general election alongside city councilmember Kathy Jensen. Colvin went on to win the general election.

== Primary election ==
=== Candidates ===
==== Advanced to general ====
- Mitch Colvin, incumbent mayor (2017–present)
- Kathy Jensen, city councilmember (2013–present)

==== Eliminated in primary ====
- Mario Benavente, city councilmember (2022–present)
- Tisha Waddell, strategic consultant and former city councilmember (2017–2021)
- Freddie de la Cruz, businessman (ran in the general as a write-in candidate)
- Paul Williams, former city councilmember (1997–1999)
- Courtney Banks-McLaughlin, city councilmember (2019–present)
- Clifton Johnson, retired army major
- John Ashford, write-in candidate for mayor in 2022
- Nahlee Smith, former social worker

=== Results ===
2025 Fayetteville mayoral primary election results
Candidate	Votes	%
Mitch Colvin (incumbent)	6,754	47.61%
Kathy Jensen	2,569	18.11%
Mario Benavente	1,359	9.58%
Tisha Waddell	996	7.02%
Freddie de la Cruz	945	6.66%
Paul Williams	737	5.20%
Courtney Banks-McLaughlin	706	4.98%
Clifton Johnson	63	0.44%
John Ashford	36	0.25%
Nahlee Smith	21	0.15%
Total votes	14,186	100.00%

== General election ==
Incumbent mayor Mitch Colvin and city councilmember Kathy Jensen advanced to the November 4 general election after placing first and second in the nonpartisan blanket primary, with 47.6% and 18.1% of the vote respectively.

On October 17, 2025, Freddie de la Cruz announced he was launching a write-in campaign for the general election, after placing 5th in the primary with 6.7% of the vote, citing the need for a candidate that Republicans can unite around. The mayoral election is nonpartisan, though both Colvin and Jensen are affiliated with the Democratic Party.

Talking to local newspaper CityView, de la Cruz said "[the people] want to vote for a mayor that’s a Republican. They can come out and vote for Freddie.” According to North Carolina State Board of Elections data, fewer than 1 in 5 residents in Fayetteville are registered Republicans.

=== Results ===
2025 Fayetteville mayoral general election results
Candidate	Votes	%
Mitch Colvin (incumbent)	12,436	60.05%
Kathy Jensen	7,855	37.93%
Write-in	418	2.02%
Total votes	20,709	100.00%
