= 2017 Fayetteville, North Carolina mayoral election =

Fayetteville, North Carolina mayoral election, 2017
- November 7, 2017
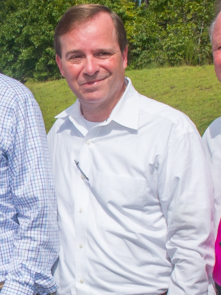
Candidate	Mitch Colvin	Nat Robertson
Popular vote	13,451	9,241
Percentage	59.14%	40.63%
Mayor before election
Nat Robertson
Republican
Elected mayor
Mitch Colvin
Democratic

The 2017 Fayetteville mayoral election took place on November 7, 2017, to elect the mayor of Fayetteville, North Carolina. It saw the election of Mitch Colvin, who unseated incumbent mayor Nat Robertson.

== Results ==
=== Primary ===
The primary was held October 10, 2017.

Primary results
Party	Candidate	Votes	%
Nonpartisan	Mitch Colvin	5,821	45.07
Nonpartisan	Nat Robertson (incumbent)	4,078	31.58
Nonpartisan	Kirk deViere	2,775	21.49
Nonpartisan	Quancidine Gribble	241	1.87

=== General election ===
General election results
Party	Candidate	Votes	%
Nonpartisan	Mitch Colvin	13,451	59.14
Nonpartisan	Nat Robertson (incumbent)	9,241	40.63
Write-in	Write-in	51	0.22
