= DeAndrea Salvador =

American politician

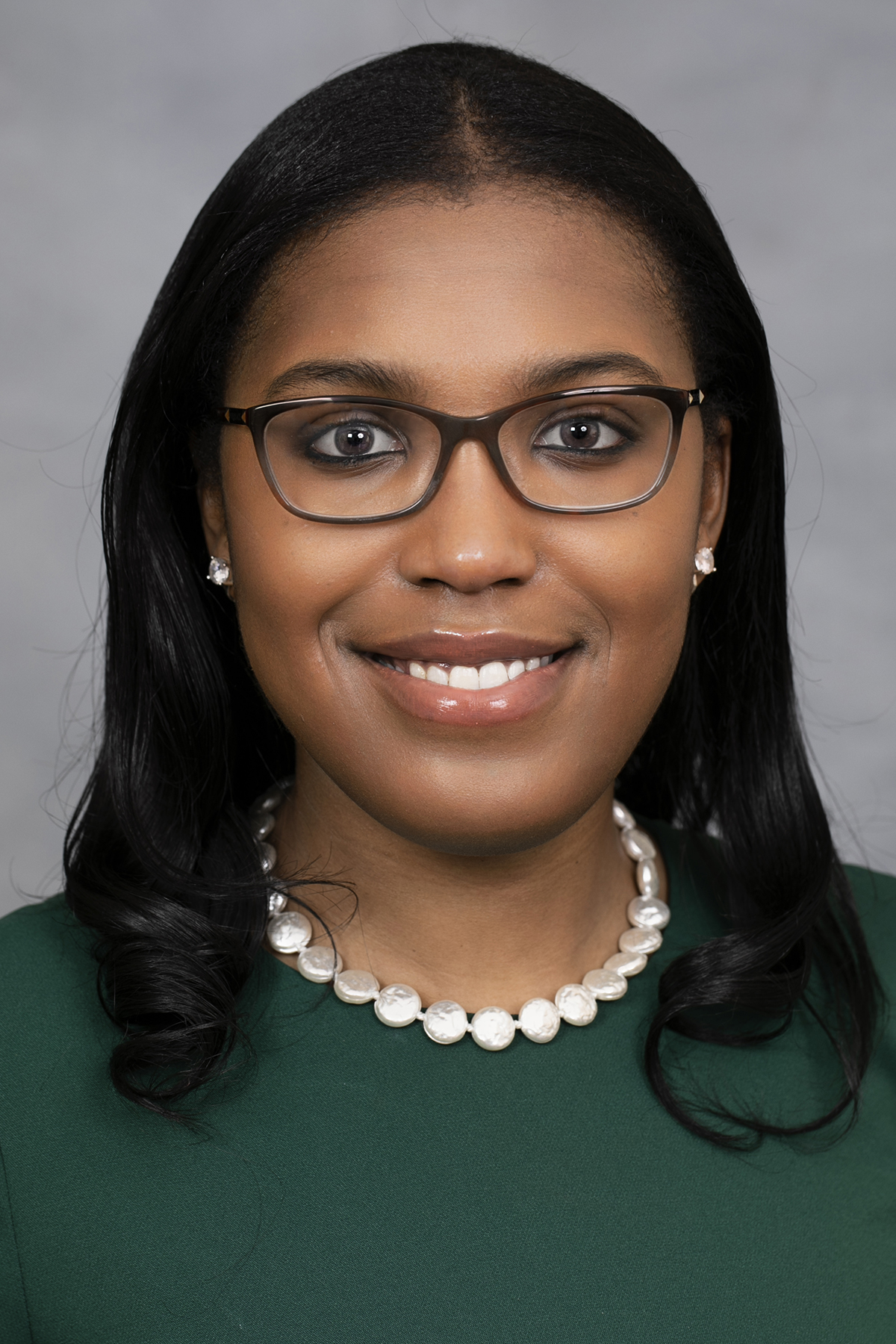
- Official portrait, 2021

Member of the North Carolina Senate from the 39th district
- Incumbent
- Assumed office January 1, 2021
- Preceded by: Rob Bryan

Personal details
- Born: Charlotte, North Carolina, U.S.
- Party: Democratic
- Education: University of North Carolina at Charlotte

DeAndrea Salvador is a Democratic member of the North Carolina Senate. She has represented the 39th Senate district since 2021. She is the founder and Chief Executive Officer of Renewable Energy Transition Initiative (RETI), a nonprofit that educates communities and leaders about energy conservation and affordability. She was a 2018 TED Fellow. Elected at age 30, Salvador is the youngest Black woman ever to serve in the North Carolina General Assembly.

== Early life and education ==
Salvador is the fifth generation of her family to live in Charlotte, North Carolina. She became concerned about energy poverty during her undergraduate studies. She studied economics, with a minor in anthropology, at University of North Carolina at Charlotte. She graduated in 2013. She was part of the Alpha Kappa Psi business fraternity: a co-educational fraternity which offered her networking opportunities in the energy sector. She wanted to learn more about sustainability and energy, and completed a Leadership in Energy and Environmental Design certificate from the U.S. Green Building Council.

== Career ==
Salvador applied to SEED20, a North Carolina social venture partnership offering training, coaching and mentoring program for nonprofits. In 2014 she founded Renewable Energy Transition Initiative (RETI), a nonprofit that educates low-income people about renewable energy. Their mission is to sustainably decrease the amount of people's income that they spend on energy. In North Carolina, many families spend more than 20% of their income on energy expenses. In 2016 she was named as a Charlotte-Mecklenburg BLACK CHAMBER of Commerce (CMBCC) 30 Under 30.

Salvador was announced as a TED Fellow in January 2018. She was announced as the University of North Carolina at Charlotte Alumni of the Year in 2018. SouthPark magazine announced her as a "Woman to Watch" in 2018. RETI has run a series of educational activities with the Boys & Girls Clubs of America, Girl Scouts of the USA, churches, neighbourhood organisations and community centres. The Grist 50 named Salvador an “emerging leader on climate, equity, and sustainability” for her involvement in negotiating HB 951 Energy Solutions for North Carolina. She is on the Board of Advisors of Clean Air Carolina, a statewide initiative to improve air quality in North Carolina. Additionally, she works in the data privacy industry and is a Certified Information Privacy Professional as recognized by the International Association of Privacy Professionals (IAPP).

== Political career ==
Salvador served on the Mecklenburg County Air Quality Commission for three years.

She defeated Joshua Niday in the 2020 general election, winning with 62% of the vote. Salvador has introduced legislation to study automation and the workforce and to reinstate a renewable energy tax credit.

In 2021, the General Assembly passed a bill introduced by Salvador that directs the North Carolina Legislative Research Council to study Lipedema.

Salvador was involved in the negotiations that led to the passage of HB 951, a landmark bipartisan energy bill that aims to achieve carbon neutrality for North Carolina by 2050. She has both praised HB 951 for its potential to improve air quality and reduce carbon emissions and criticized the bill for not doing enough to lower energy costs for low-income households.

North Carolina Senate
Preceded by Rob Bryan	Member of the North Carolina Senate from the 39th district 2021-Present	Incumbent
