= 2013 Fayetteville, North Carolina mayoral election =

Fayetteville, North Carolina mayoral election, 2013
- November 5, 2013
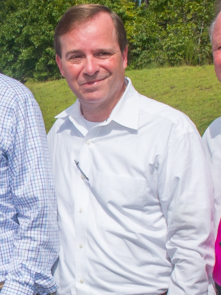

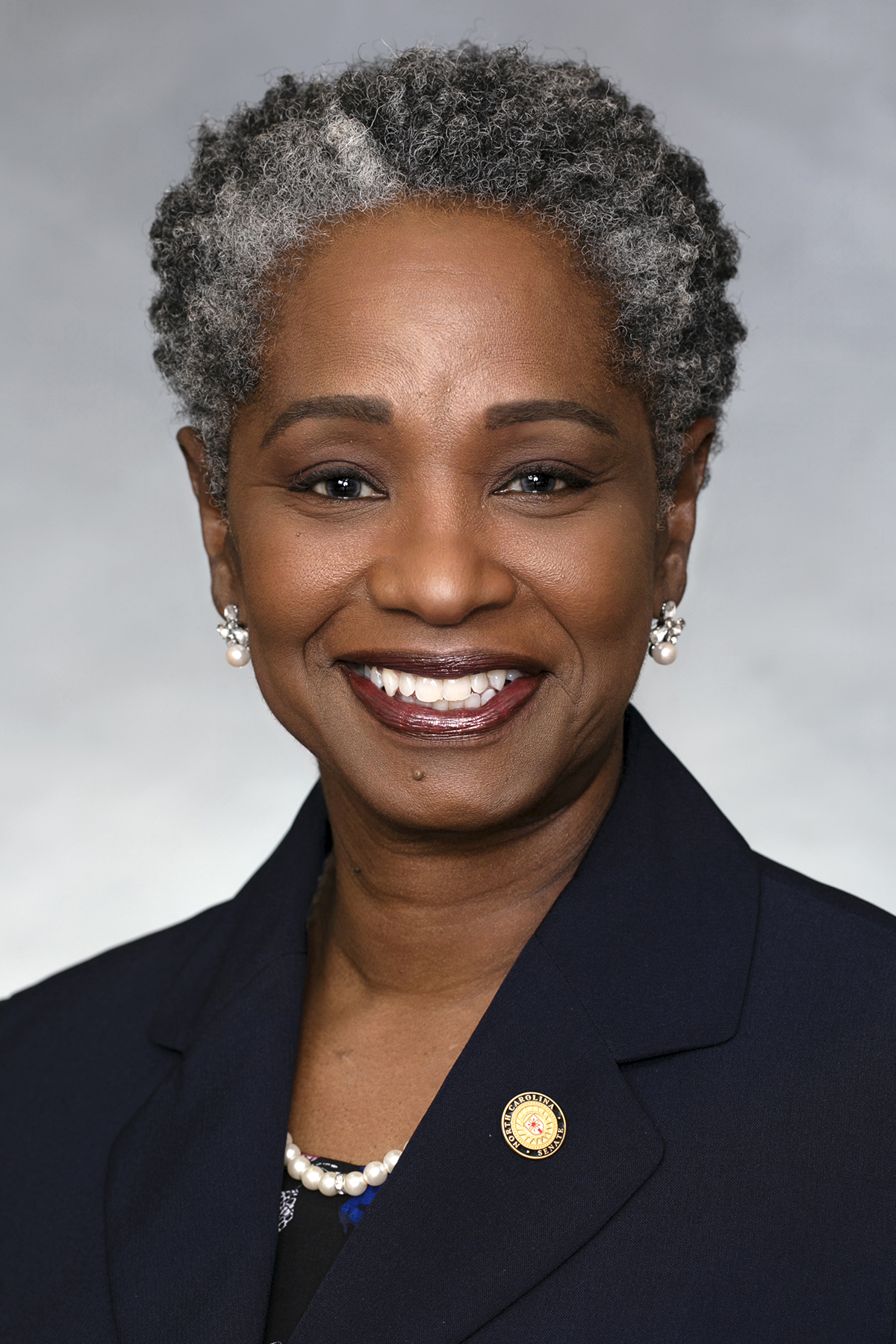
Candidate	Nat Robertson	Val Applewhite
Popular vote	11,591	11,331
Percentage	50.49%	49.36%
Mayor before election
Tony Chavonne
Elected mayor
Nat Robertson
Republican

The 2013 Fayetteville mayoral election took place on November 5, 2013, to elect the mayor of Fayetteville, North Carolina. It saw the election of Nat Robertson.

Incumbent mayor Tony Chavonne did not seek reelection to a fifth term.

== Results ==
=== Primary election ===
The primary was held October 8, 2013.

Fayetteville mayoral primary election, 2013
Party	Candidate	Votes	%
Nonpartisan	Val Applewhite	5,416	43.93%
Nonpartisan	Nat Robertson	3,809	30.89%
Nonpartisan	Kirk deViere	2,468	20.02%
Nonpartisan	Paul A. Williams	517	4.19%
Nonpartisan	Charles Ragan	119	0.97%
Total votes		12,329	100%

=== General election ===
Fayetteville mayoral general election, 2013
Party	Candidate	Votes	%
Nonpartisan	Nat Robertson	11,591	50.49%
Nonpartisan	Val Applewhite	11,331	49.36%
Write-in		34	0.15%
Total votes		22,956	100%
