= Wesley Meredith =

American politician from North Carolina

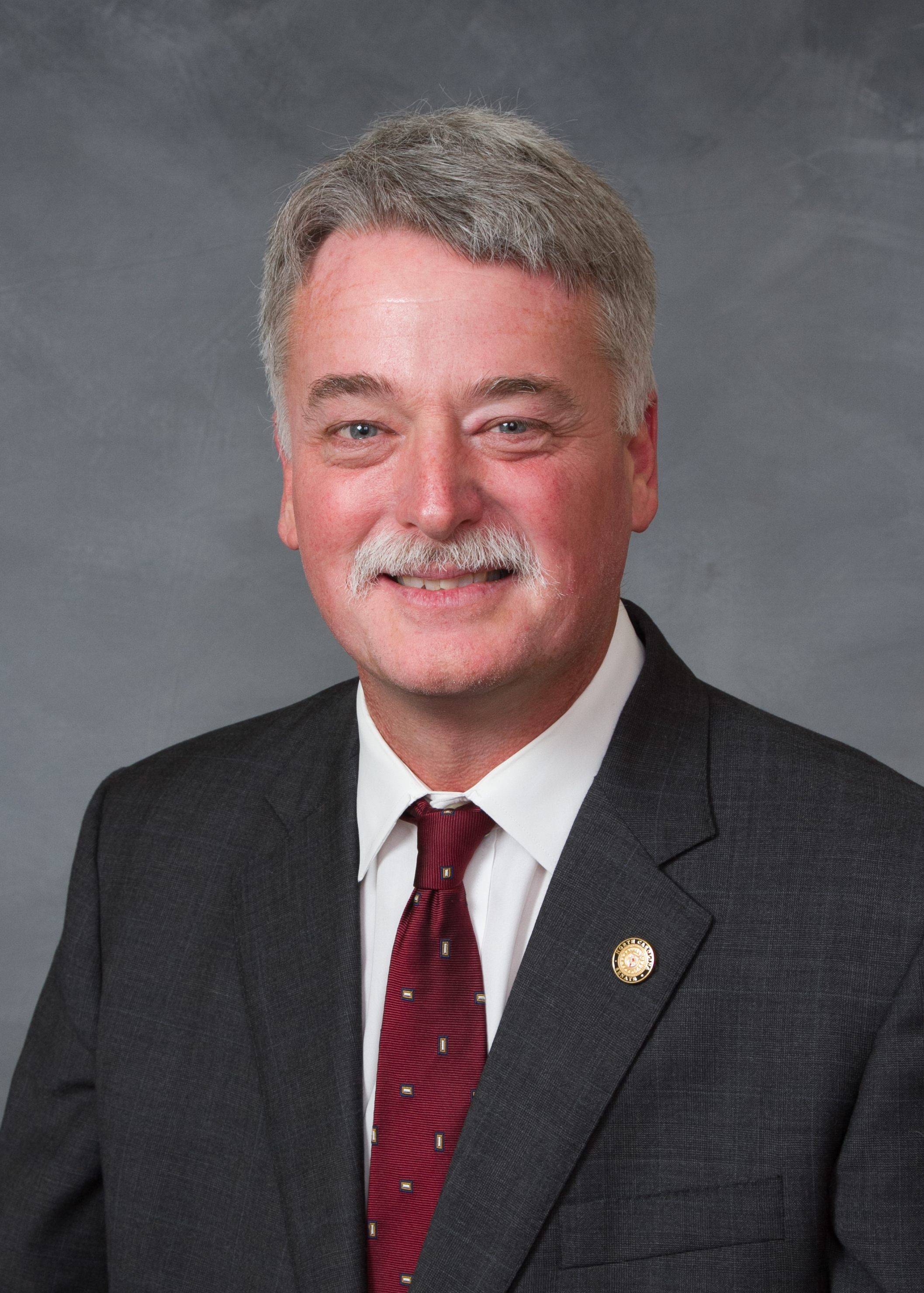

Member of the North Carolina Senate from the 19th district
- In office January 1, 2011 – January 1, 2019
- Preceded by: Margaret Dickson
- Succeeded by: Kirk deViere

Personal details
- Born: Wesley Alan Meredith; December 22, 1963 (age 62) Tupelo, Mississippi
- Party: Republican
- Education: Fayetteville Technical Community College
- Occupation: Landscape contractor

Wesley Alan Meredith (born December 22, 1963) is a former Republican senator in the North Carolina General Assembly in the state's nineteenth Senatorial district. The 19th district is made up of Cumberland County.

Meredith was born in Tupelo, Mississippi, and moved to Fort Bragg, North Carolina, where he served in the 307th Engineer Battalion of the 82 Airborne Division. He left the military after nearly three years of service with an Honorable Discharge rank of Sergeant having received the Army Service Ribbon, the Army Achievement Medal with 2 Oak Leaf Clusters, and the NCO Professional Development Ribbon.

Prior to becoming a state senator in 2011, Meredith served on the Fayetteville City Council for three terms spanning from 2005 to 2010. From 2007 to 2009, Meredith held the position of Mayor Pro Tempore.

Meredith served on the following Senate standing committees: Appropriations on Department of Transportation (co-chair), Commerce (co-chair), Agriculture/Environment/Natural Resources, Transportation, and Rules and Operations of the Senate.

== Electoral history ==
North Carolina Senate District 19: Results 2010-2020
Year	Democratic	Votes	Pct	Republican	Votes	Pct
2010	Margaret Dickson	23,964	48.90%	Wesley Meredith	25,047	51.10%
2012	George Tatum	31,936	46.12%	Wesley Meredith	37,308	53.88%
2014	William (Billy) Richardson	19,781	45.56%	Wesley Meredith	23,636	54.44%
2016	Toni Morris	30,750	43.54%	Wesley Meredith	39,877	56.46%
2018	Kirk deViere	29,815	50.37%	Wesley Meredith	29,382	49.63%
2020	Kirk deViere	46,740	51.53%	Wesley Meredith	43,966	48.47%
2022	Val Applewhite	30,755	52.70%	Wesley Meredith	27,601	47.30%

North Carolina Senate
Preceded by Margaret Dickson	Member of the North Carolina Senate from the 19th district 2011-2019	Succeeded by Kirk deViere
