= Margaret H. Dickson =

American politician

Margaret Dickson
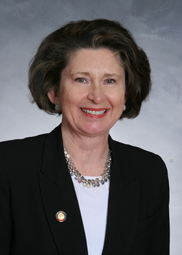

Member of the North Carolina Senate from the 19th district
- In office January 21, 2010 – January 1, 2011
- Preceded by: Tony Rand
- Succeeded by: Wesley Meredith

Member of the North Carolina House of Representatives
- In office January 1, 2003 – January 21, 2010
- Preceded by: Mia Morris (Redistricting)
- Succeeded by: Diane Parfitt
- Constituency: 41st District (2003-2005); 44th District (2005-2010)

Personal details
- Born: September 21, 1949 (age 76)
- Party: Democratic
- Spouse: John W. Dickson
- Children: 3
- Education: University of North Carolina, Chapel Hill (BA)

Margaret Highsmith Dickson is a former Democratic member of the North Carolina General Assembly. In 2010, she was in her fourth two-year term representing the state's 44th House district, including constituents in Cumberland and Harnett counties, when she was selected by local Democrats to replace state Senator Tony Rand, who had resigned. She is a retired broadcaster from Fayetteville, North Carolina.

Dickson has served as the chair of the House Commerce, Small Business, and Entrepreneurship committee and University Board of Governors Nominating committee and as the vice-chair of the committee on Insurance. Dickson was also a member of House Appropriations, Appropriations Subcommittee on Transportation, Education, Education Subcommittee on Universities, and Homeland Security, Military, and Veterans Affairs.

== Electoral history ==
=== 2010 ===
North Carolina Senate 19th district general election, 2010
Party	Candidate	Votes	%
Republican	Wesley Meredith	25,047	51.10%
Democratic	Margaret Dickson (incumbent)	23,964	48.90%
Total votes		49,011	100%
Republican gain from Democratic			

=== 2008 ===
North Carolina House of Representatives 44th district general election, 2008
Party	Candidate	Votes	%
Democratic	Margaret Dickson (incumbent)	17,260	61.59%
Republican	Lou Huddleston	10,763	38.41%
Total votes		28,023	100%
Democratic hold			

=== 2006 ===
North Carolina House of Representatives 44th district general election, 2006
Party	Candidate	Votes	%
Democratic	Margaret Dickson (incumbent)	8,648	100%
Total votes		8,648	100%
Democratic hold			

=== 2004 ===
North Carolina House of Representatives 44th district general election, 2004
Party	Candidate	Votes	%
Democratic	Margaret Dickson (incumbent)	13,764	58.38%
Republican	Ralph Reagan	9,812	41.62%
Total votes		23,576	100%
Democratic hold			

=== 2002 ===
North Carolina House of Representatives 41st district general election, 2002
Party	Candidate	Votes	%
Democratic	Margaret Dickson	8,596	50.68%
Republican	Mia Morris (incumbent)	8,365	49.32%
Total votes		16,961	100%
Democratic gain from Republican			

North Carolina House of Representatives
Preceded by George Holmes; Tracy Walker	Member of the North Carolina House of Representatives from the 41st district 2003–2005	Succeeded by Russell Capps
Preceded by Rick Glazier	Member of the North Carolina House of Representatives from the 44th district 2005–2010	Succeeded by Dianne Parfitt
North Carolina Senate
Preceded by Tony Rand	Member of the North Carolina Senate from the 19th district 2010–2011	Succeeded by Wesley Meredith
