= 2015 Fayetteville, North Carolina mayoral election =

Fayetteville, North Carolina mayoral election, 2015
- November 3, 2015
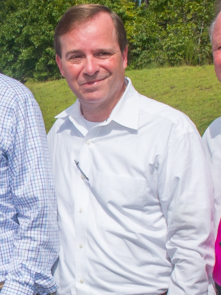

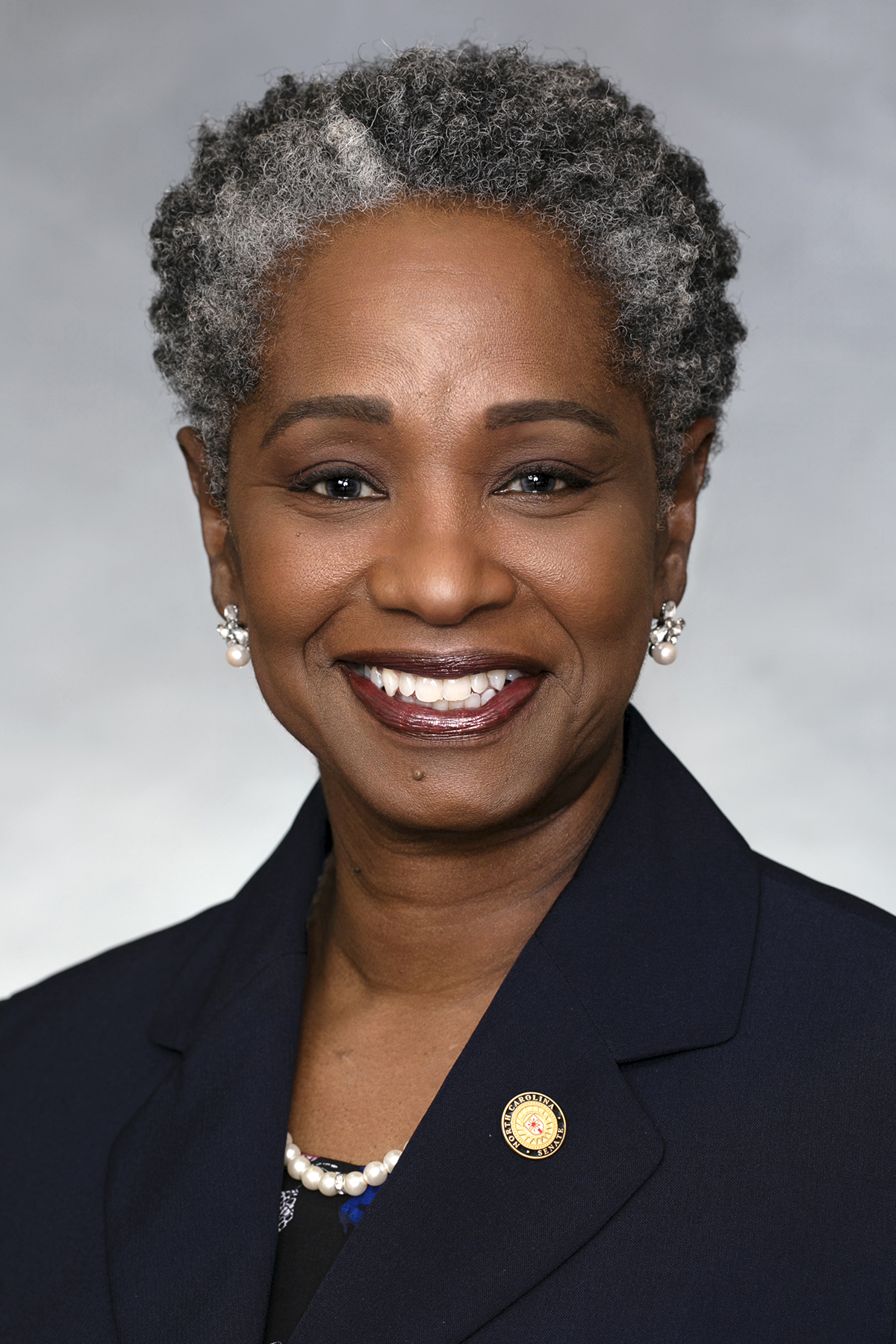
Candidate	Nat Robertson	Val Applewhite
Popular vote	9,273	8,604
Percentage	51.81%	48.07%
Mayor before election
Nat Robertson
Republican
Elected mayor
Nat Robertson
Republican

The 2015 Fayetteville mayoral election took place on November 3, 2015, to elect the mayor of Fayetteville, North Carolina. It saw the reelection of incumbent mayor Nat Robertson.

== Results ==
=== Primary election ===
The primary was held October 6, 2015.

Fayetteville mayoral primary election, 2015
Party	Candidate	Votes	%
Nonpartisan	Nat Robertson (incumbent)	4,333	52.43%
Nonpartisan	Val Applewhite	3,748	45.35%
Nonpartisan	Edward Donovan	184	2.23%
Total votes		8,265	100%

=== General election ===
Fayetteville mayoral general election, 2015
Party	Candidate	Votes	%
Nonpartisan	Nat Robertson (incumbent)	9,273	51.81%
Nonpartisan	Val Applewhite	8,604	48.07%
Write-in		21	0.12%
Total votes		17,898	100%
