= 2022 Fayetteville, North Carolina, mayoral election =

Fayetteville mayoral election, 2022
- July 26, 2022
Candidate	Mitch Colvin	Efrain “Freddie” de la Cruz
Party	Nonpartisan	Nonpartisan
Popular vote	9,306	5,475
Percentage	62.78%	36.93%
Mayor before election
Mitch Colvin
Nonpartisan
Elected mayor
Mitch Colvin
Nonpartisan

The 2022 election for the Mayor of Fayetteville, North Carolina was held on July 26, 2022. Mayor Mitch Colvin, who was first elected in 2017, ran for re-election to a third term. He defeated retired Army Lt. Col. Efrain “Freddie” de la Cruz. Colvin was re-elected with 62.7% of the vote.

== Candidates ==
- Mitch Colvin, mayor of Fayetteville since 2017
- Freddie de la Cruz

== Results ==
2022 Fayetteville mayoral election
Party	Candidate	Votes	%
	Mitch Colvin	9,253	62.74%
	Efrain “Freddie” de la Cruz	5,475	36.93%
	Write-in	43	0.29%
