= 2019 Fayetteville, North Carolina, mayoral election =

Fayetteville mayoral election, 2019
- November 5, 2019
| Candidate | Mitch Colvin |
| Party | Nonpartisan |
| Popular vote | 10,276 |
| Percentage | 94.8% |
Mayor before election
Mitch Colvin
Nonpartisan
Elected mayor
Mitch Colvin
Nonpartisan

The 2019 election for the Mayor of Fayetteville, North Carolina was held on November 5, 2019. Mayor Mitch Colvin, who was first elected in 2017, ran for re-election to a second term. No other candidate filed to run. Colvin was re-elected with 94.8% of the vote, with 5.2% of the vote going to various write-in candidates.

== Candidates ==
- Mitch Colvin, Mayor of Fayetteville since 2017

== Results ==
2019 Fayetteville mayoral election
| Party | Candidate | Votes | % |
|---|---|---|---|
| Nonpartisan | Mitch Colvin | 10,276 | 94.8 |
| Other | Write-ins | 564 | 5.2 |
