= Diane Parfitt =

American politician

Member of the North Carolina House of Representatives from the 44th district
- In office February 19, 2010 – January 1, 2013
- Preceded by: Margaret H. Dickson
- Succeeded by: Rick Glazier

Personal details
- Born: January 18, 1946 (age 80)
- Party: Democratic

Diane Parfitt (born January 18, 1946) is an American politician who served in the North Carolina House of Representatives from the 44th district from 2010 to 2013.
