= Nat Robertson =

American politician

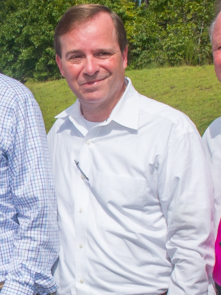

Mayor of Fayetteville, North Carolina
- In office December 2, 2013 – December 2017
- Preceded by: Tony Chavonne
- Succeeded by: Mitch Colvin

Personal details
- Born: Gainesville, Florida, U.S.
- Party: Republican
- Spouse: Kim Robertson
- Education: Elon University
- Profession: Politician
- Website: http://natrobertson.com/

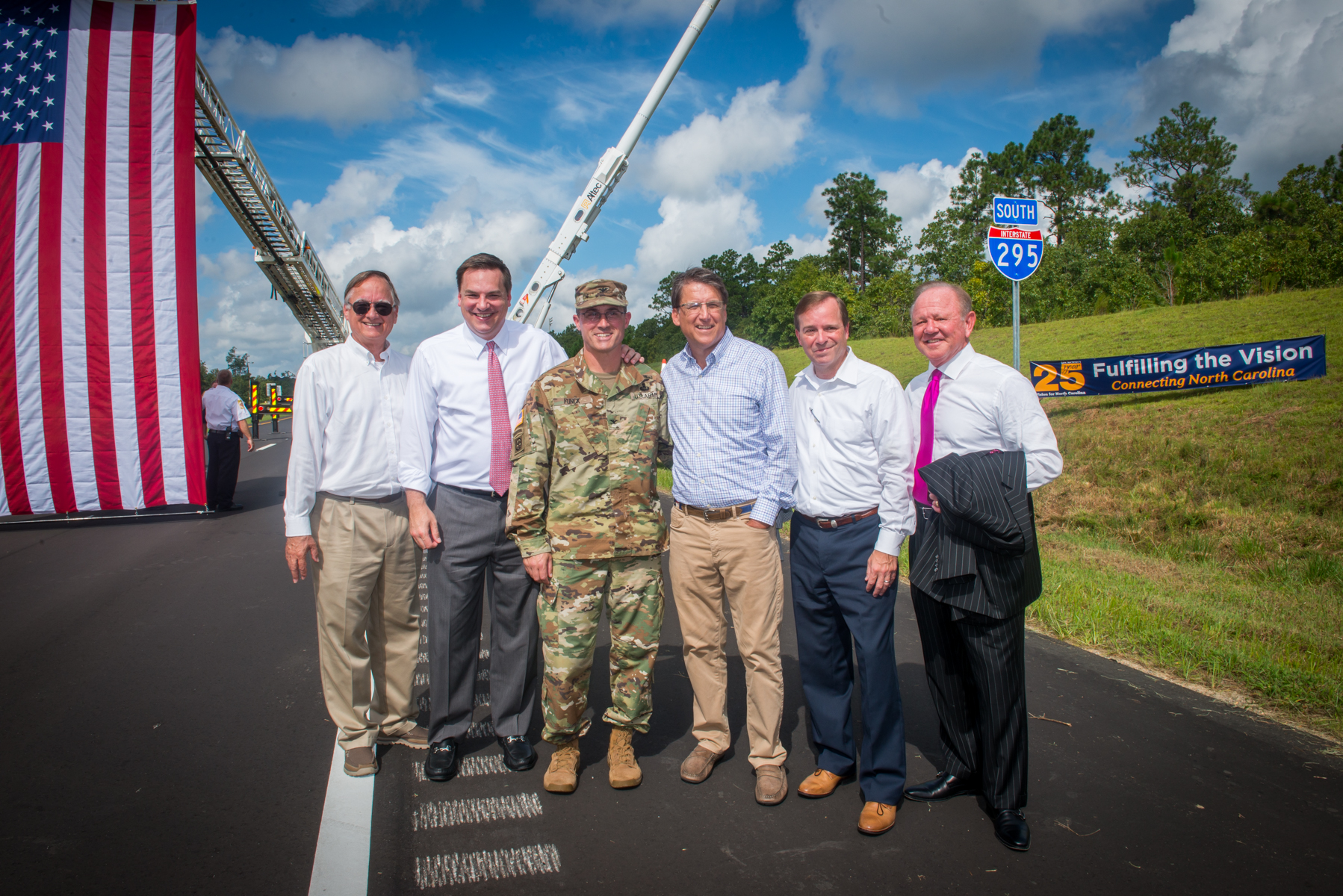
Group shot of the speakers at the Fayetteville Outer Loop ribbon-cutting event. From left-to-right: Nick Tennyson, Secretary of the North Carolina Department of Transportation; Richard Hudson, U.S. Congressman; Col. Brett Funck, Fort Bragg's garrison commander; Pat McCrory, North Carolina Governor; Nat Robertson, Fayetteville Mayor; and last person unknown.

Nat Robertson (born 1963) is an American businessman and politician, who served as the mayor of Fayetteville, North Carolina, from December 2, 2013, through December 2017. Robertson had previously served in the Fayetteville City Council for eight years (four terms). Mayors of Fayetteville are elected to two-year terms.

== Political career ==
Robertson, a member of the Republican Party, and the first Republican mayor elected since the 1970s, served as a member of the Fayetteville City Council for three-consecutive terms from 1989 until 1995. He also served on the city council for a fourth term from 1999 to 2001. Robertson first ran for mayor in 2011, but was defeated by incumbent Mayor Tony Chavonne, who won re-election to a fourth term.

In April 2013, incumbent Fayetteville Mayor Tony Chavonne announced that he would not seek re-election after four consecutive terms in office. Robertson soon announced his candidacy to succeed Chavonne. He narrowly defeated his opponent, city councilwoman and real estate agent Val Applewhite, in the mayoral election on November 5, 2013. Robertson received over 50% of the vote, while Applewhite placed a close second with over 49%. Voter turnout was more than 20%, which was considered high for an off-year Fayetteville municipal election.

Robertson was sworn into office on December 2, 2013, for a two-year term as mayor.

Governor of North Carolina, Pat McCrory, appointed Robertson to the Governor's Crime Commission during the spring of 2014. He began work on the commission during its June 2014 quarterly meeting.

In 2015, Robertson was reelected, again defeating Applewhite.

On April 17, 2017, Robertson announced his bid for a third term as mayor of Fayetteville. He was defeated for reelection that November by Mayor Pro Tem Mitch Colvin.

== Continuing service ==
Robertson now serves as the president and CEO of the Greater Fayetteville Chamber and is credited with new initiatives and growth.
