= Kirk deViere =

American politician

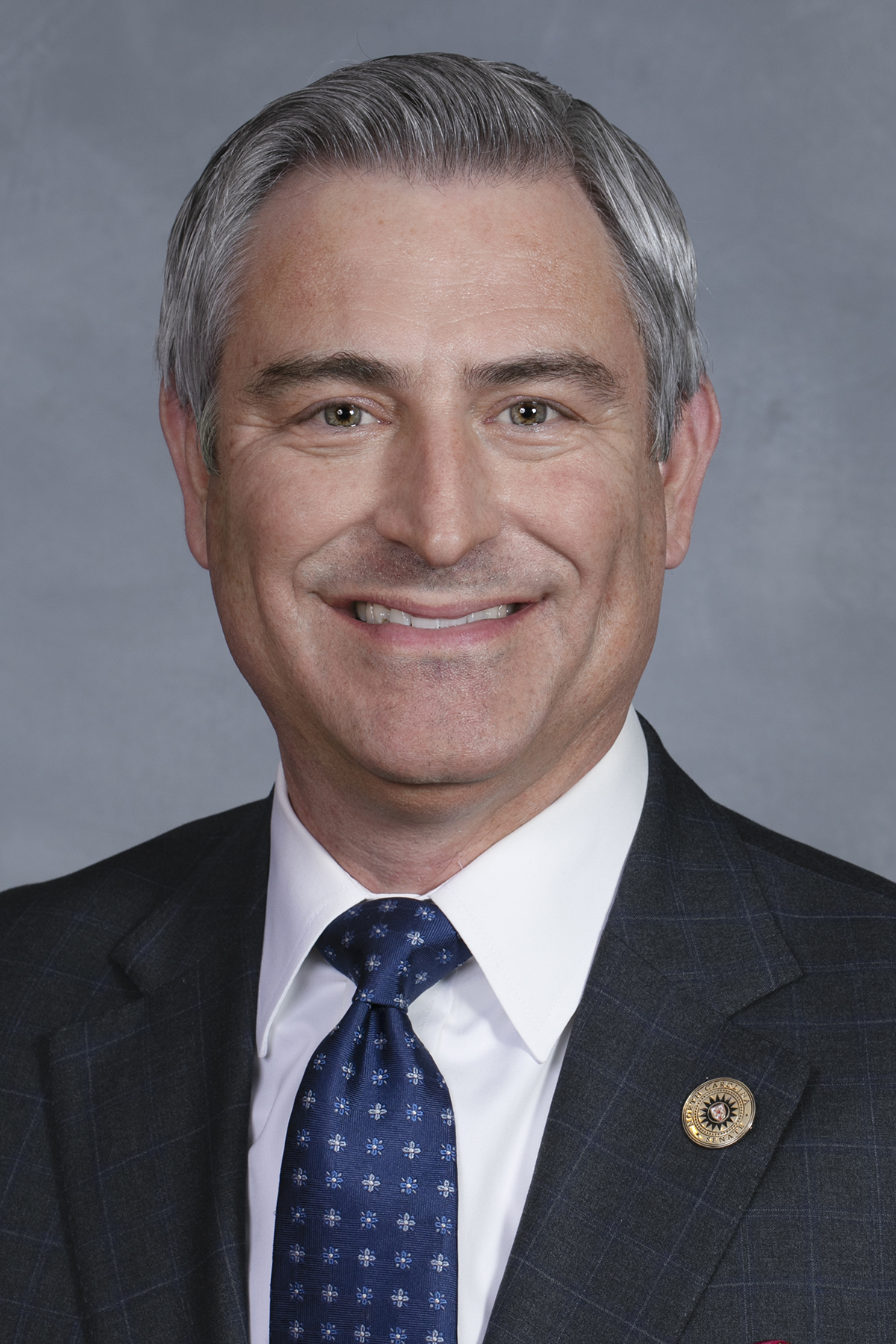

Member of the North Carolina Senate from the 19th district
- In office January 1, 2019 – January 1, 2023
- Preceded by: Wesley Meredith
- Succeeded by: Val Applewhite

Personal details
- Born: January 27, 1970 (age 56)
- Party: Democratic
- Spouse: Jenny
- Children: Son, Greyson
- Education: Troy University, Huntingdon College
- Profession: Entrepreneur
- Website: https://www.kirkdeviere.com/

Kirk Joseph deViere (born January 27, 1970) is a former Democratic member of the North Carolina State Senate, having representing the 19th district from 2019 to 2023. He was first elected in the 2018 elections, defeating incumbent state senator Wesley Meredith and won re-election in the 2020 elections. deViere previously served on the Fayetteville, North Carolina city council from 2015 to 2017.

== Political career ==
In 2015, deViere was elected to the Fayetteville, North Carolina city council. deViere had previously been a candidate in both the 2013 and 2017 Fayetteville, North Carolina mayoral elections, placing third each time in the primary and failing make the general election.

In 2018, deViere announced his intention to run against incumbent Republican Wesley Meredith for the North Carolina State Senate District 19. On May 8, 2018 deViere defeated Clarence Donaldson in the Democratic primary by a margin of 62.6% to 37.4%. In the 2018 general election, deViere went on to defeat incumbent Senator Wesley Meredith by a margin of 50.4 to 49.6 (433 votes).

In 2020, deViere defeated former senator Wesley Meredith during the general election by a margin of 51.4% to 48.5% in their rematch. He was defeated in the 2022 Democratic primary election by Val Applewhite after she received the endorsement of then-incumbent governor Roy Cooper.

=== North Carolina Senate committee memberships ===
Standing or select committees (2021-2022 Session)

- Appropriations/Base Budget
- Appropriations on Department of Transportation
- Commerce and Insurance
- Finance
- Transportation
- Joint Legislative Transportation Oversight Committee
- Joint Legislative Program Evaluation Oversight Committee

Standing or select committees (2019-2020 Session)

- Appropriations on Department of Transportation
- Pensions and Retirement and Aging
- Transportation
- Joint Legislative Transportation Oversight Committee
- Joint Legislative Program Evaluation Oversight Committee

== Electoral history ==
=== 2022 ===
North Carolina Senate 19th district Democratic primary election, 2022
Party	Candidate	Votes	%
Democratic	Val Applewhite	7,588	56.24%
Democratic	Kirk deViere (incumbent)	4,972	36.85%
Democratic	Ed Donaldson	931	6.90%
Total votes		13,491	100%

=== 2020 ===
North Carolina Senate 19th district general election, 2020
Party	Candidate	Votes	%
Democratic	Kirk deViere (incumbent)	46,740	51.53%
Republican	Wesley Meredith	43,966	48.47%
Total votes		90,706	100%
Democratic hold			

=== 2018 ===
North Carolina Senate 19th district Democratic primary election, 2018
Party	Candidate	Votes	%
Democratic	Kirk deViere	5,257	62.59%
Democratic	Clarence E. Donaldson	3,142	37.41%
Total votes		8,399	100%

North Carolina Senate 19th district general election, 2018
Party	Candidate	Votes	%
Democratic	Kirk deViere	29,815	50.37%
Republican	Wesley Meredith (incumbent)	29,382	49.63%
Total votes		59,197	100%
Democratic gain from Republican			

North Carolina Senate
Preceded by Wesley Meredith	Member of the North Carolina Senate from the 19th district 2019–2023	Succeeded by Val Applewhite
