= North Carolina's 19th Senate district =

American legislative district

North Carolina's 19th State Senate district
Senator
Val Applewhite; D–Fayetteville
- Demographics: 42% White; 36% Black; 13% Hispanic; 2% Asian; 1% Native American; 1% Other; 5% Multiracial
- Population (2023): 217,644

North Carolina's 19th Senate district is one of 50 districts in the North Carolina Senate. It has been represented by Democrat Val Applewhite since 2023.

== Geography ==
Since 2013, the district has included part of Cumberland County. The district overlaps with the 42nd, 43rd, 44th, and 45th state house districts.

== District officeholders since 1973 ==
=== Multi-member district ===
Senator	Party	Dates	Notes	Senator	Party	Dates	Notes	Senator	Party	Dates	Notes	Counties
McNeill Smith (Greensboro)	Democratic	January 1, 1973 – January 1, 1979		C. Coolidge Murrow (High Point)	Republican	January 1, 1973 – January 1, 1975	Redistricted from the 18th district.	Lynwood Smith (High Point)	Democratic	January 1, 1973 – January 1, 1977		1973–1983; All of Guilford County.
McNeill Smith (Greensboro)	Democratic	January 1, 1973 – January 1, 1979		Katherine Sebo (Greensboro)	Democratic	January 1, 1975 – September 4, 1979	Resigned.	Lynwood Smith (High Point)	Democratic	January 1, 1973 – January 1, 1977		1973–1983; All of Guilford County.
McNeill Smith (Greensboro)	Democratic	January 1, 1973 – January 1, 1979		Katherine Sebo (Greensboro)	Democratic	January 1, 1975 – September 4, 1979	Resigned.	Rachel Gray (High Point)	Democratic	January 1, 1977 – January 1, 1983	Redistricted to the 32nd district	1973–1983; All of Guilford County.
Walter Cockerham (Greensboro)	Republican	January 1, 1979 – January 1, 1983		Katherine Sebo (Greensboro)	Democratic	January 1, 1975 – September 4, 1979	Resigned.	Rachel Gray (High Point)	Democratic	January 1, 1977 – January 1, 1983	Redistricted to the 32nd district	1973–1983; All of Guilford County.
Walter Cockerham (Greensboro)	Republican	January 1, 1979 – January 1, 1983		Vacant		September 4, 1979 – September 25, 1979		Rachel Gray (High Point)	Democratic	January 1, 1977 – January 1, 1983	Redistricted to the 32nd district	1973–1983; All of Guilford County.
Walter Cockerham (Greensboro)	Republican	January 1, 1979 – January 1, 1983		James Turner (Greensboro)	Democratic	September 25, 1979 – January 1, 1981	Appointed to finish Sebo's term.	Rachel Gray (High Point)	Democratic	January 1, 1977 – January 1, 1983	Redistricted to the 32nd district	1973–1983; All of Guilford County.
Walter Cockerham (Greensboro)	Republican	January 1, 1979 – January 1, 1983		Henry Frye (Greensboro)	Democratic	January 1, 1981 – January 1, 1983	Retired.	Rachel Gray (High Point)	Democratic	January 1, 1977 – January 1, 1983	Redistricted to the 32nd district	1973–1983; All of Guilford County.

=== Single-member district ===
Senator	Party	Dates	Notes	Counties
Elton Edwards (Greensboro)	Democratic	January 1, 1983 – January 1, 1985		1983–1993; Parts of Guilford and Forsyth counties.
Bob Shaw (Greensboro)	Republican	January 1, 1985 – January 1, 2003	Redistricted to the 26th district and lost re-nomination.	1983–1993; Parts of Guilford and Forsyth counties.
Bob Shaw (Greensboro)	Republican	January 1, 1985 – January 1, 2003	Redistricted to the 26th district and lost re-nomination.	1993–2003; Parts of Guilford, Davidson, and Randolph counties.
Tony Rand (Fayetteville)	Democratic	January 1, 2003 – December 31, 2009	Redistricted from the 24th district. Resigned.	2003–2013; All of Bladen County. Part of Cumberland County.
Vacant		December 31, 2009 – January 21, 2010		2003–2013; All of Bladen County. Part of Cumberland County.
Margaret Dickson (Fayetteville)	Democratic	January 21, 2010 – January 1, 2011	Appointed to finish Rand's term. Lost re-election.	2003–2013; All of Bladen County. Part of Cumberland County.
Wesley Meredith (Fayetteville)	Republican	January 1, 2011 – January 1, 2019	Lost re-election.	2003–2013; All of Bladen County. Part of Cumberland County.
Wesley Meredith (Fayetteville)	Republican	January 1, 2011 – January 1, 2019	Lost re-election.	2013–Present; Part of Cumberland County.
Kirk deViere (Fayetteville)	Democratic	January 1, 2019 – January 1, 2023	Lost re-nomination.	2013–Present; Part of Cumberland County.
Val Applewhite (Fayetteville)	Democratic	January 1, 2023 – Present		2013–Present; Part of Cumberland County.

== Election results ==
=== 2024 ===
North Carolina Senate 19th district general election, 2024
Party	Candidate	Votes	%
Democratic	Val Applewhite (incumbent)	55,697	62.87%
Republican	Semone Pemberton	30,005	33.87%
Libertarian	Steven Swinton	2,884	3.26%
Total votes		88,586	100%
Democratic hold			

=== 2022 ===
North Carolina Senate 19th district Democratic primary election, 2022
Party	Candidate	Votes	%
Democratic	Val Applewhite	7,588	56.24%
Democratic	Kirk deViere (incumbent)	4,972	36.85%
Democratic	Ed Donaldson	931	6.90%
Total votes		13,491	100%

North Carolina Senate 19th district Republican primary election, 2022
Party	Candidate	Votes	%
Republican	Wesley Meredith	5,781	72.42%
Republican	Dennis Britt	2,202	27.58%
Total votes		7,983	100%

North Carolina Senate 19th district general election, 2022
Party	Candidate	Votes	%
Democratic	Val Applewhite	30,755	52.70%
Republican	Wesley Meredith	27,601	47.30%
Total votes		58,356	100%
Democratic hold			

=== 2020 ===
North Carolina Senate 19th district general election, 2020
Party	Candidate	Votes	%
Democratic	Kirk deViere (incumbent)	46,740	51.53%
Republican	Wesley Meredith	43,966	48.47%
Total votes		90,706	100%
Democratic hold			

=== 2018 ===
North Carolina Senate 19th district Democratic primary election, 2018
Party	Candidate	Votes	%
Democratic	Kirk deViere	5,257	62.59%
Democratic	Clarence E. Donaldson	3,142	37.41%
Total votes		8,399	100%

North Carolina Senate 19th district general election, 2018
Party	Candidate	Votes	%
Democratic	Kirk deViere	29,815	50.37%
Republican	Wesley Meredith (incumbent)	29,382	49.63%
Total votes		59,197	100%
Democratic gain from Republican			

=== 2016 ===
North Carolina Senate 19th district general election, 2016
Party	Candidate	Votes	%
Republican	Wesley Meredith (incumbent)	40,359	56.44%
Democratic	Toni Morris	31,149	43.56%
Total votes		71,508	100%
Republican hold			

=== 2014 ===
North Carolina Senate 19th district general election, 2014
Party	Candidate	Votes	%
Republican	Wesley Meredith (incumbent)	23,636	54.44%
Democratic	Billy Richardson	19,781	45.56%
Total votes		43,417	100%
Republican hold			

=== 2012 ===
North Carolina Senate 19th district general election, 2012
Party	Candidate	Votes	%
Republican	Wesley Meredith (incumbent)	37,308	53.88%
Democratic	George Tatum	31,936	46.12%
Total votes		69,244	100%
Republican hold			

=== 2010 ===
North Carolina Senate 19th district general election, 2010
Party	Candidate	Votes	%
Republican	Wesley Meredith	25,047	51.10%
Democratic	Margaret Dickson (incumbent)	23,964	48.90%
Total votes		49,011	100%
Republican gain from Democratic			

=== 2008 ===
North Carolina Senate 19th district general election, 2008
Party	Candidate	Votes	%
Democratic	Tony Rand (incumbent)	57,027	100%
Total votes		57,027	100%
Democratic hold			

=== 2006 ===
North Carolina Senate 19th district Democratic primary election, 2006
Party	Candidate	Votes	%
Democratic	Tony Rand (incumbent)	8,971	75.35%
Democratic	Paul Williams	2,935	24.65%
Total votes		11,906	100%

North Carolina Senate 19th district general election, 2006
Party	Candidate	Votes	%
Democratic	Tony Rand (incumbent)	22,731	100%
Total votes		22,731	100%
Democratic hold			

=== 2004 ===
North Carolina Senate 19th district general election, 2004
Party	Candidate	Votes	%
Democratic	Tony Rand (incumbent)	43,413	100%
Total votes		43,413	100%
Democratic hold			

=== 2002 ===
North Carolina Senate 19th district Democratic primary election, 2002
Party	Candidate	Votes	%
Democratic	Tony Rand (incumbent)	15,025	77.58%
Democratic	Russell McLaurin	4,341	22.42%
Total votes		19,366	100%

North Carolina Senate 19th district general election, 2002
Party	Candidate	Votes	%
Democratic	Tony Rand (incumbent)	25,493	63.36%
Republican	Bob White	14,741	36.64%
Total votes		40,234	100%
Democratic hold			

=== 2000 ===
North Carolina Senate 19th district Republican primary election, 2000
Party	Candidate	Votes	%
Republican	Robert G. "Bob" Shaw (incumbent)	9,399	82.32%
Republican	Randy Tuggle	2,019	17.68%
Total votes		11,418	100%

North Carolina Senate 19th district general election, 2000
Party	Candidate	Votes	%
Republican	Robert G. "Bob" Shaw (incumbent)	58,838	100%
Total votes		58,838	100%
Republican hold			
