= Sam Searcy =

American politician

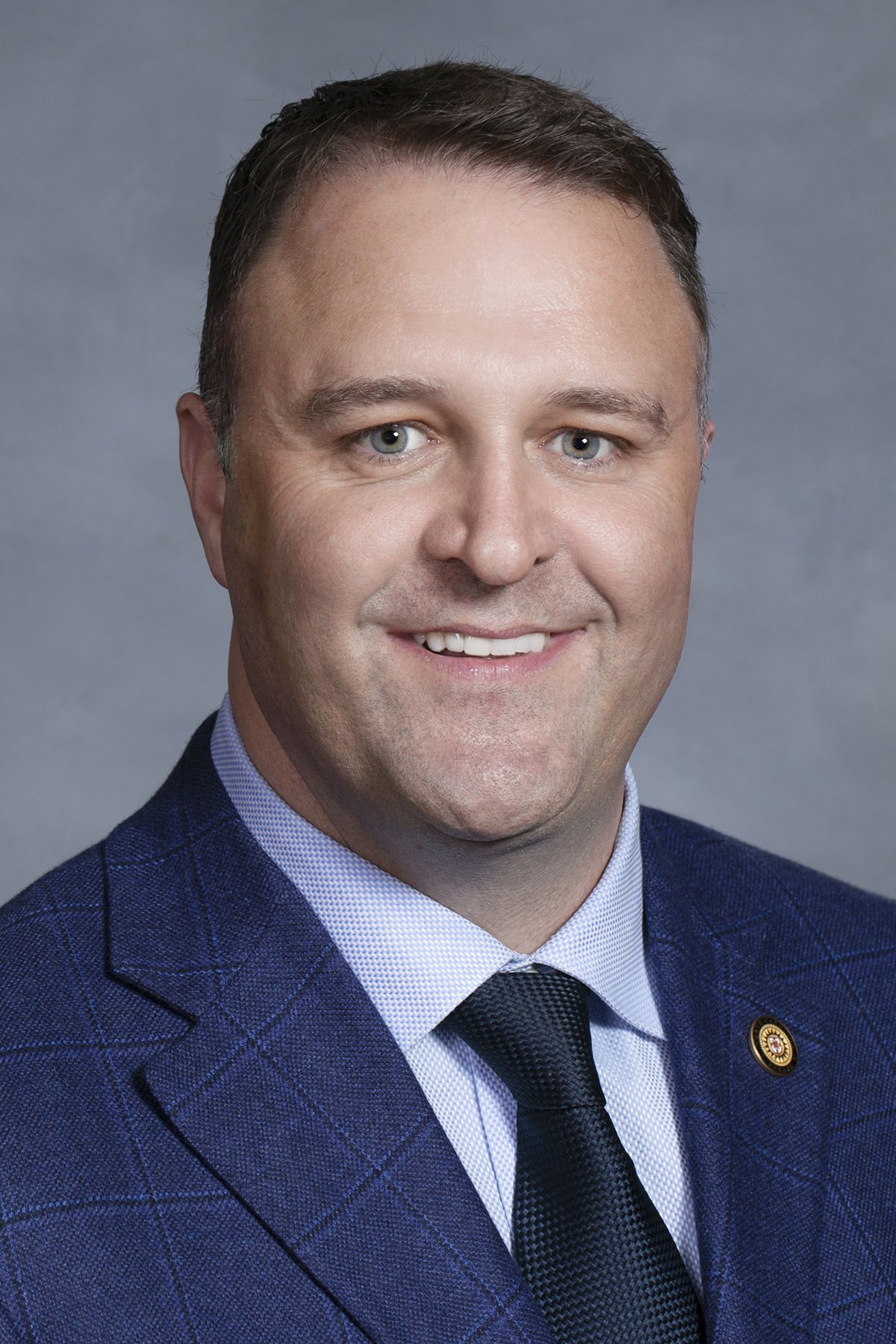

Member of the North Carolina Senate from the 17th district
- In office January 1, 2019 – December 30, 2020
- Preceded by: Tamara Barringer
- Succeeded by: Sydney Batch

Personal details
- Born: Samuel Lee Searcy
- Party: Democratic
- Spouse: Shauna Searcy
- Education: Appalachian State University (BA); University of Tulsa (JD)
- Website: Campaign website

Samuel Lee Searcy is an American politician who was a Democratic member of the North Carolina General Assembly representing the state's 17th Senate district from 2019 until his resignation in 2020.

== Career ==
Searcy defeated Tamara Barringer on November 6, 2018, as the nominee of the Democratic Party. Searcy won by a margin of 50 percent to 47 percent for Barringer. In November 2020, Searcy was reelected to a second term by defeating Mark Cavaliero by a margin of 51 to 44 percent. In November 2020, Searcy launched CliniStart, along with Brad Wilson, the former CEO of Blue Cross and Blue Shield of NC. Searcy then resigned before his term began in January 2021.

In July 2021, Governor Roy Cooper appointed Searcy to a six-year term on the North Carolina Capital State Board of Community Colleges.

Searcy announced that he had filed to run in the Democratic primary for 13th congressional district. The district covered southern Wake County, as well as all of Johnston County and parts of both Wayne and Harnett Counties.

In the May 2022 Democratic primary for North Carolina’s 13th congressional district, Searcy was defeated by Wiley Nickel, who received 52% of the vote to Searcy’s 22%.

North Carolina Senate
| Preceded by Tamara Barringer | Member of the North Carolina Senate from the 17th district 2019–2020 | Succeeded by Sydney Batch |
