= Mitch Colvin =

American businessman and politician

Mayor of Fayetteville, North Carolina
- Incumbent
- Assumed office December 4, 2017
- Preceded by: Nat Robertson

Personal details
- Born: 1973 (age 52–53) Fayetteville, North Carolina, U.S.
- Party: Democratic
- Education: Fayetteville State University
- Profession: Politician, mortician

Mitch Colvin (born 1973) is an American businessman, mortician and politician who currently serves as the Mayor of Fayetteville, North Carolina, starting December 2017.

Colvin, a member of the Democratic Party, has served as a member of the Fayetteville City Council for two consecutive terms from 2013 to 2017.

In addition to serving on the council as mayor pro tem, Mayor Colvin serves as the chair of the Baseball Committee, which negotiated a deal to bring minor league baseball affiliate of the Houston Astros to downtown Fayetteville after the Astros' minor league affiliate, the Bakersfield Blaze, had dissolved. The minor league team ended up becoming the Fayetteville Woodpeckers.

North Carolina Governor Roy Cooper appointed Mitch Colvin to the Governor's Crime Commission in May 2017. He began work on the Commission during its June 2017 quarterly meeting.

In July 2017, Colvin filed as a candidate for the office of Mayor of Fayetteville. In October 2017, he led all candidates in the primary election with 45% of the votes. In November 2017, he faced incumbent Nat Robertson, a Republican, in a general election for mayor. Colvin won the election with 59% of the vote.

In the November 2019 election, Colvin was the only candidate on the ballot. He received 95% of the vote. Colvin won re-election in 2022 with 62% of the vote.
