= North Carolina's 80th House district =

American legislative district

North Carolina's 80th State House of Representatives district
Representative
Sam Watford; R–Thomasville
- Demographics: 75% White; 10% Black; 10% Hispanic; 1% Asian; 4% Multiracial
- Population (2024): 87,371

North Carolina's 80th House district is one of 120 districts in the North Carolina House of Representatives. It has been represented by Republican Sam Watford since 2021.

== Geography ==
Since 2013, the district has included part of Davidson County. The district overlaps with the 30th Senate district.

== District officeholders ==
Representative	Party	Dates	Notes	Counties
District created January 1, 1993.
Robert Grady (Jacksonville)	Republican	January 1, 1993 – January 1, 2003	Redistricted from the 4th district. Redistricted to the 15th district.	1993–2003; Part of Onslow County.
Jerry Dockham (Denton)	Republican	January 1, 2003 – July 1, 2013	Redistricted from the 94th district. Resigned.	2003–Present; Part of Davidson County.
Vacant		July 1, 2013 – July 16, 2013		2003–Present; Part of Davidson County.
Roger Younts (Lexington)	Republican	July 16, 2013 – January 1, 2015	Appointed to finish Dockham's term. Lost re-nomination.	2003–Present; Part of Davidson County.
Sam Watford (Thomasville)	Republican	January 1, 2015 – January 1, 2019	Retired to run for State Senate.	2003–Present; Part of Davidson County.
Steve Jarvis (Lexington)	Republican	January 1, 2019 – January 1, 2021	Retired to run for State Senate.	2003–Present; Part of Davidson County.
Sam Watford (Thomasville)	Republican	January 1, 2021 – Present		2003–Present; Part of Davidson County.

== Election results ==
=== 2026 ===
North Carolina House of Representatives 80th district Republican primary election, 2026
Party	Candidate	Votes	%
Republican	Sam Watford (incumbent)	5,415	74.38%
Republican	Joseph Byrne	1,865	25.62%
Total votes		7,280	100%

North Carolina House of Representatives 80th district general election, 2026
Party	Candidate	Votes	%
Republican	Sam Watford (incumbent)		
Democratic	JacQuez Johnson		
Total votes			100%

=== 2024 ===
North Carolina House of Representatives 80th district Republican primary election, 2024
Party	Candidate	Votes	%
Republican	Sam Watford (incumbent)	5,931	50.32%
Republican	Eddie Gallimore	5,855	49.68%
Total votes		11,786	100%

North Carolina House of Representatives 80th district general election, 2024
Party	Candidate	Votes	%
Republican	Sam Watford (incumbent)	33,897	75.70%
Democratic	Kimberly Titlebaum	10,884	24.30%
Total votes		44,781	100%
Republican hold			

=== 2022 ===
North Carolina House of Representatives 80th district general election, 2022
Party	Candidate	Votes	%
Republican	Sam Watford (incumbent)	23,182	78.46%
Democratic	Dennis S. Miller	6,365	21.54%
Total votes		29,547	100%
Republican hold			

=== 2020 ===
North Carolina House of Representatives 80th district Republican primary election, 2020
Party	Candidate	Votes	%
Republican	Sam Watford	4,170	43.65%
Republican	Roger Younts	3,214	33.64%
Republican	Haley Sink	2,170	22.71%
Total votes		9,554	100%

North Carolina House of Representatives 80th district general election, 2020
Party	Candidate	Votes	%
Republican	Sam Watford	32,611	75.21%
Democratic	Wendy Sellars	10,748	24.79%
Total votes		43,359	100%
Republican hold			

=== 2018 ===
North Carolina House of Representatives 80th district Republican primary election, 2018
Party	Candidate	Votes	%
Republican	Steve Jarvis	6,371	67.28%
Republican	Roger Younts	3,098	32.72%
Total votes		9,469	100%

North Carolina House of Representatives 80th district general election, 2018
Party	Candidate	Votes	%
Republican	Steve Jarvis	21,283	75.08%
Democratic	Wendy B. Sellars	7,063	24.92%
Total votes		28,346	100%
Republican hold			

=== 2016 ===
North Carolina House of Representatives 80th district general election, 2016
Party	Candidate	Votes	%
Republican	Sam Watford (incumbent)	31,287	100%
Total votes		31,287	100%
Republican hold			

=== 2014 ===
North Carolina House of Representatives 80th district Republican primary election, 2014
Party	Candidate	Votes	%
Republican	Sam Watford	3,203	54.45%
Republican	Roger Younts (incumbent)	2,679	45.55%
Total votes		5,882	100%

North Carolina House of Representatives 80th district general election, 2014
Party	Candidate	Votes	%
Republican	Sam Watford	16,459	100%
Total votes		16,459	100%
Republican hold			

=== 2012 ===
North Carolina House of Representatives 80th district Republican primary election, 2012
Party	Candidate	Votes	%
Republican	Jerry Dockham (incumbent)	5,432	52.51%
Republican	Christy Jones	3,086	29.83%
Republican	Dick Johnson	1,827	17.66%
Total votes		10,345	100%

North Carolina House of Representatives 80th district general election, 2012
Party	Candidate	Votes	%
Republican	Jerry Dockham (incumbent)	24,080	68.63%
Democratic	Loretta M. Martin	11,009	31.37%
Total votes		35,089	100%
Republican hold			

=== 2010 ===
North Carolina House of Representatives 80th district Republican primary election, 2010
Party	Candidate	Votes	%
Republican	Jerry Dockham (incumbent)	5,105	64.08%
Republican	Dick Johnson	2,861	35.92%
Total votes		7,966	100%

North Carolina House of Representatives 80th district general election, 2010
Party	Candidate	Votes	%
Republican	Jerry Dockham (incumbent)	16,593	100%
Total votes		16,593	100%
Republican hold			

=== 2008 ===
North Carolina House of Representatives 80th district general election, 2008
Party	Candidate	Votes	%
Republican	Jerry Dockham (incumbent)	27,537	100%
Total votes		27,537	100%
Republican hold			

=== 2006 ===
North Carolina House of Representatives 80th district general election, 2006
Party	Candidate	Votes	%
Republican	Jerry Dockham (incumbent)	10,801	100%
Total votes		10,801	100%
Republican hold			

=== 2004 ===
North Carolina House of Representatives 80th district general election, 2004
Party	Candidate	Votes	%
Republican	Jerry Dockham (incumbent)	24,367	100%
Total votes		24,367	100%
Republican hold			

=== 2002 ===
North Carolina House of Representatives 80th district general election, 2002
Party	Candidate	Votes	%
Republican	Jerry Dockham (incumbent)	15,662	100%
Total votes		15,662	100%
Republican hold			

=== 2000 ===
North Carolina House of Representatives 80th district general election, 2000
Party	Candidate	Votes	%
Republican	Robert Grady (incumbent)	6,732	62.40%
Democratic	Charles Wiggins	4,057	37.60%
Total votes		10,789	100%
Republican hold			
