= North Carolina's 45th Senate district =

American legislative district

North Carolina's 45th State Senate district
Senator
Mark Hollo; R–Conover
- Demographics: 76% White; 7% Black; 10% Hispanic; 3% Asian; 4% Multiracial
- Population (2023): 219,437

North Carolina's 45th Senate district is one of 50 districts in the North Carolina Senate. It has been represented by Republican Mark Hollo since 2025.

== Geography ==
Since 2023, the district has included all of Catawba County, as well as part of Caldwell County. The district overlaps with the 87th, 89th, and 96th state house districts.

== District officeholders since 2003 ==
Senator	Party	Dates	Notes	Counties
District created January 1, 2003.				2003–2005; All of Caldwell, Watauga, Ashe, and Alleghany counties. Part of Wilkes County.
Virginia Foxx (Banner Elk)	Republican	January 1, 2003 – January 1, 2005	Redistricted from the 12th district. Retired to run for Congress.	2003–2005; All of Caldwell, Watauga, Ashe, and Alleghany counties. Part of Wilkes County.
John Garwood (North Wilkesboro)	Republican	January 1, 2005 – January 1, 2007	Redistricted from the 30th district. Lost re-nomination.	2005–2013; All of Watauga, Ashe, Wilkes, and Alexander counties.
Steve Goss (Boone)	Democratic	January 1, 2007 – January 1, 2011	Lost re-election.	2005–2013; All of Watauga, Ashe, Wilkes, and Alexander counties.
Dan Soucek (Boone)	Republican	January 1, 2011 – April 8, 2016	Resigned.	2005–2013; All of Watauga, Ashe, Wilkes, and Alexander counties.
Dan Soucek (Boone)	Republican	January 1, 2011 – April 8, 2016	Resigned.	2013–2019; All of Avery County, Caldwell, Watauga, Ashe, and Alleghany counties.
Vacant		April 8, 2016 - April 27, 2016		2013–2019; All of Avery County, Caldwell, Watauga, Ashe, and Alleghany counties.
Deanna Ballard (Blowing Rock)	Republican	April 27, 2016 – January 1, 2023	Appointed to finish Soucek's term. Redistricted to the 47th district and lost re-nomination.	2013–2019; All of Avery County, Caldwell, Watauga, Ashe, and Alleghany counties.
Deanna Ballard (Blowing Rock)	Republican	April 27, 2016 – January 1, 2023	Appointed to finish Soucek's term. Redistricted to the 47th district and lost re-nomination.	2019–2023; All of Watauga, Ashe, Alleghany, and Wilkes counties. Part of Surry County.
Dean Proctor (Hickory)	Republican	January 1, 2023 – January 1, 2025	Redistricted from the 42nd district. Retired.	2023–Present; All of Catawba County. Part of Caldwell County.
Mark Hollo (Conover)	Republican	January 1, 2025 – Present		2023–Present; All of Catawba County. Part of Caldwell County.

== Election results ==
=== 2024 ===
North Carolina Senate 45th district Republican primary election, 2024
Party	Candidate	Votes	%
Republican	Mark Hollo	16,390	60.40%
Republican	Nancy Meek	10,746	39.60%
Total votes		27,136	100%

North Carolina Senate 45th district general election, 2024
Party	Candidate	Votes	%
Republican	Mark Hollo	80,033	70.28%
Democratic	Kim Bost	33,840	29.72%
Total votes		113,873	100%
Republican hold			

=== 2022 ===
North Carolina Senate 45th district general election, 2022
Party	Candidate	Votes	%
Republican	Dean Proctor (incumbent)	61,327	100%
Total votes		61,327	100%
Republican hold			

=== 2020 ===
North Carolina Senate 45th district general election, 2020
Party	Candidate	Votes	%
Republican	Deanna Ballard (incumbent)	71,897	68.45%
Democratic	Jeanne Supin	33,139	31.55%
Total votes		105,036	100%
Republican hold			

=== 2018 ===
North Carolina Senate 45th district Republican primary election, 2018
Party	Candidate	Votes	%
Republican	Deanna Ballard (incumbent)	8,403	53.59%
Republican	Shirley Randleman (incumbent)	7,276	46.41%
Total votes		15,679	100%

North Carolina Senate 45th district general election, 2018
Party	Candidate	Votes	%
Republican	Deanna Ballard (incumbent)	48,998	65.08%
Democratic	Wes Luther	26,293	34.92%
Total votes		75,291	100%
Republican hold			

=== 2016 ===
North Carolina Senate 45th district Republican primary election, 2016
Party	Candidate	Votes	%
Republican	Deanna Ballard	13,546	53.00%
Republican	Ken Boham	12,013	47.00%
Total votes		25,559	100%

North Carolina Senate 45th district general election, 2016
Party	Candidate	Votes	%
Republican	Deanna Ballard (incumbent)	56,758	65.00%
Democratic	Art Sherwood	30,559	35.00%
Total votes		87,317	100%
Republican hold			

=== 2014 ===
North Carolina Senate 45th district general election, 2014
Party	Candidate	Votes	%
Republican	Dan Soucek (incumbent)	33,165	60.18%
Democratic	Jim Sponenberg	21,941	39.82%
Total votes		55,106	100%
Republican hold			

=== 2012 ===
North Carolina Senate 45th district Republican primary election, 2012
Party	Candidate	Votes	%
Republican	Dan Soucek (incumbent)	17,384	65.43%
Republican	George Robinson	9,186	34.57%
Total votes		26,570	100%

North Carolina Senate 45th district general election, 2012
Party	Candidate	Votes	%
Republican	Dan Soucek (incumbent)	50,848	60.71%
Democratic	Roy J. Carter	32,913	39.29%
Total votes		83,761	100%
Republican hold			

=== 2010 ===
North Carolina Senate 45th district Republican primary election, 2010
Party	Candidate	Votes	%
Republican	Dan Soucek	6,356	52.69%
Republican	Jeffrey Elmore	5,708	47.31%
Total votes		12,064	100%

North Carolina Senate 45th district general election, 2010
Party	Candidate	Votes	%
Republican	Dan Soucek	34,777	59.96%
Democratic	Steve Goss (incumbent)	23,223	40.04%
Total votes		58,000	100%
Republican gain from Democratic			

=== 2008 ===
North Carolina Senate 45th district Republican primary election, 2008
Party	Candidate	Votes	%
Republican	Jerry Butler	7,655	53.82%
Republican	Dwight Shook	6,568	46.18%
Total votes		14,223	100%

North Carolina Senate 45th district general election, 2008
Party	Candidate	Votes	%
Democratic	Steve Goss (incumbent)	46,014	53.90%
Republican	Jerry Butler	39,349	46.10%
Total votes		85,363	100%
Democratic hold			

=== 2006 ===
North Carolina Senate 45th district Republican primary election, 2006
Party	Candidate	Votes	%
Republican	David Blust	7,572	61.00%
Republican	John Garwood (incumbent)	4,842	39.00%
Total votes		12,414	100%

North Carolina Senate 45th district general election, 2006
Party	Candidate	Votes	%
Democratic	Steve Goss	24,269	50.33%
Republican	David Blust	23,950	49.67%
Total votes		48,219	100%
Democratic gain from Republican			

=== 2004 ===
North Carolina Senate 45th district general election, 2004
Party	Candidate	Votes	%
Republican	John Garwood (incumbent)	47,005	61.69%
Democratic	Jim Cain	29,192	38.31%
Total votes		76,197	100%
Republican hold			

=== 2002 ===
North Carolina Senate 45th district general election, 2002
Party	Candidate	Votes	%
Republican	Virginia Foxx (incumbent)	32,971	61.81%
Democratic	Mollie C. Laws	18,602	34.87%
Libertarian	Fran Grig	1,768	3.31%
Total votes		53,341	100%
Republican hold			
