= North Carolina's 94th House district =

American legislative district

North Carolina's 94th State House of Representatives district
Representative
Blair Eddins; R–Purlear
- Demographics: 85% White; 4% Black; 7% Hispanic; 1% Asian; 3% Multiracial
- Population (2024): 86,060

North Carolina's 94th House district is one of 120 districts in the North Carolina House of Representatives. It has been represented by Republican Blair Eddins since 2024.

== Geography ==
Since 2019, the district has included all of Alexander County, as well as part of Wilkes County. The district overlaps with the 36th Senate district.

== District officeholders ==
Representative	Party	Dates	Notes	Counties
District created January 1, 1993.
Jerry Dockham (Denton)	Republican	January 1, 1993 – January 1, 2003	Redistricted from the 37th district. Redistricted to the 80th district.	1993–2003; Parts of Davidson and Randolph counties.
Michael Decker (Walkertown)	Republican	January 1, 2003 – January 24, 2003	Redistricted from the 84th district. Switched parties. Switched back to the Republican Party. Redistricted to the 73rd district and lost re-nomination.	2003–2005; Part of Forsyth County.
Michael Decker (Walkertown)	Democratic	January 24, 2003 – September 15, 2003	Redistricted from the 84th district. Switched parties. Switched back to the Republican Party. Redistricted to the 73rd district and lost re-nomination.	2003–2005; Part of Forsyth County.
Michael Decker (Walkertown)	Republican	September 15, 2003 – January 1, 2005	Redistricted from the 84th district. Switched parties. Switched back to the Republican Party. Redistricted to the 73rd district and lost re-nomination.	2003–2005; Part of Forsyth County.
Tracy Walker (Wilkesboro)	Republican	January 1, 2005 – January 1, 2009	Redistricted from the 83rd district. Retired.	2005–2013; All of Wilkes County.
Shirley Randleman (Wilkesboro)	Republican	January 1, 2009 – January 1, 2013	Retired to run for State Senate.	2005–2013; All of Wilkes County.
Jeffrey Elmore (North Wilkesboro)	Republican	January 1, 2013 – September 13, 2024	Retired to run for Lieutenant Governor and resigned.	2013–2019; All of Alleghany County; Part of Wilkes County.
Jeffrey Elmore (North Wilkesboro)	Republican	January 1, 2013 – September 13, 2024	Retired to run for Lieutenant Governor and resigned.	2019–Present; All of Alexander County; Part of Wilkes County.
Vacant		September 13, 2024 – October 1, 2024		2019–Present; All of Alexander County; Part of Wilkes County.
Blair Eddins (Purlear)	Republican	October 1, 2024 – Present	Appointed to finish Elmore's term.	2019–Present; All of Alexander County; Part of Wilkes County.

== Election results ==
=== 2024 ===
North Carolina House of Representatives 94th district Republican primary election, 2024
Party	Candidate	Votes	%
Republican	Blair Eddins	6,869	43.31%
Republican	Stoney Greene	4,922	31.04%
Republican	Larry Yoder	2,628	16.57%
Republican	Dwight Shook	1,440	9.08%
Total votes		15,859	100%

North Carolina House of Representatives 94th district general election, 2024
Party	Candidate	Votes	%
Republican	Blair Eddins (incumbent)	35,329	76.97%
Democratic	Steve Moree	10,573	23.03%
Total votes		45,902	100%
Republican hold			

=== 2022 ===
North Carolina House of Representatives 94th district general election, 2022
Party	Candidate	Votes	%
Republican	Jeffrey Elmore (incumbent)	27,924	80.07%
Democratic	Chuck Hubbard	6,952	19.93%
Total votes		34,876	100%
Republican hold			

=== 2020 ===
North Carolina House of Representatives 94th district general election, 2020
Party	Candidate	Votes	%
Republican	Jeffrey Elmore (incumbent)	36,696	100%
Total votes		36,696	100%
Republican hold			

=== 2018 ===
North Carolina House of Representatives 94th district general election, 2018
Party	Candidate	Votes	%
Republican	Jeffrey Elmore (incumbent)	21,278	72.68%
Democratic	Dianne Little	7,998	27.32%
Total votes		29,276	100%
Republican hold			

=== 2016 ===
North Carolina House of Representatives 94th district general election, 2016
Party	Candidate	Votes	%
Republican	Jeffrey Elmore (incumbent)	24,467	74.51%
Democratic	Michael T. Lentz	8,372	25.49%
Total votes		32,839	100%
Republican hold			

=== 2014 ===
North Carolina House of Representatives 94th district Republican primary election, 2014
Party	Candidate	Votes	%
Republican	Jeffrey Elmore (incumbent)	4,616	70.07%
Republican	Gary D. Blevins	1,972	29.93%
Total votes		6,588	100%

North Carolina House of Representatives 94th district general election, 2014
Party	Candidate	Votes	%
Republican	Jeffrey Elmore (incumbent)	16,357	100%
Total votes		16,357	100%
Republican hold			

=== 2012 ===
North Carolina House of Representatives 94th district Republican primary election, 2012
Party	Candidate	Votes	%
Republican	Jeffrey Elmore	6,937	61.89%
Republican	John Reavill	2,168	19.34%
Republican	John J. Goudreau	2,103	18.76%
Total votes		11,208	100%

North Carolina House of Representatives 94th district general election, 2012
Party	Candidate	Votes	%
Republican	Jeffrey Elmore	23,601	100%
Total votes		23,601	100%
Republican hold			

=== 2010 ===
North Carolina House of Representatives 94th district Republican primary election, 2010
Party	Candidate	Votes	%
Republican	Shirley Randleman (incumbent)	4,892	77.68%
Republican	John Reavill	1,406	22.32%
Total votes		6,298	100%

North Carolina House of Representatives 94th district general election, 2010
Party	Candidate	Votes	%
Republican	Shirley Randleman (incumbent)	14,322	73.65%
Democratic	David H. Moulton	5,124	26.35%
Total votes		19,446	100%
Republican hold			

=== 2008 ===
North Carolina House of Representatives 94th district Republican primary election, 2008
Party	Candidate	Votes	%
Republican	Shirley Randleman	3,828	51.23%
Republican	Roger Dale Smithey	2,531	33.87%
Republican	John Reavill	1,113	14.90%
Total votes		7,472	100%

North Carolina House of Representatives 94th district general election, 2008
Party	Candidate	Votes	%
Republican	Shirley Randleman	17,578	60.38%
Democratic	Larry Pendry	11,533	39.62%
Total votes		29,111	100%
Republican hold			

=== 2006 ===
North Carolina House of Representatives 94th district Republican primary election, 2006
Party	Candidate	Votes	%
Republican	Tracy Walker (incumbent)	2,848	61.18%
Republican	Barry Brown	1,807	38.82%
Total votes		4,655	100%

North Carolina House of Representatives 94th district general election, 2006
Party	Candidate	Votes	%
Republican	Tracy Walker (incumbent)	7,550	55.62%
Democratic	Judith Barlow Porter	6,025	44.38%
Total votes		13,575	100%
Republican hold			

=== 2004 ===
North Carolina House of Representatives 94th district Republican primary election, 2004
Party	Candidate	Votes	%
Republican	Tracy Walker (incumbent)	4,126	60.61%
Republican	David Sprinkle	2,682	39.39%
Total votes		6,808	100%

North Carolina House of Representatives 94th district general election, 2004
Party	Candidate	Votes	%
Republican	Tracy Walker (incumbent)	20,714	100%
Total votes		20,714	100%
Republican hold			

=== 2002 ===
North Carolina House of Representatives 94th district Republican primary election, 2002
Party	Candidate	Votes	%
Republican	Michael Decker (incumbent)	3,908	61.17%
Republican	Edward L. Powell	2,481	38.83%
Total votes		6,389	100%

North Carolina House of Representatives 94th district general election, 2002
Party	Candidate	Votes	%
Republican	Michael Decker (incumbent)	17,110	84.96%
Libertarian	Ed Topolski	3,029	15.04%
Total votes		20,139	100%
Republican hold			

=== 2000 ===
North Carolina House of Representatives 94th district general election, 2000
Party	Candidate	Votes	%
Republican	Jerry Dockham (incumbent)	15,369	88.94%
Libertarian	Ken Younts	1,912	11.06%
Total votes		17,281	100%
Republican hold			
