= North Carolina's 29th Senate district =

American legislative district

North Carolina's 29th State Senate district
Senator
Dave Craven; R–Asheboro
- Demographics: 66% White; 18% Black; 11% Hispanic; 1% Asian; 1% Native American; 3% Multiracial
- Population (2023): 220,333

North Carolina's 29th Senate district is one of 50 districts in the North Carolina Senate. It has been represented by Republican Dave Craven since 2023.

== Geography ==
Since 2023, the district has included all of Montgomery, Richmond, and Anson counties, as well as parts of Randolph and Union counties. The district overlaps with the 52nd, 55th, 67th, 70th, and 78th state house districts.

== District officeholders ==
Senator	Party	Dates	Notes	Counties
Clark Plexico (Hendersonville)	Democratic	January 1, 1993 – January 1, 1997	Redistricted from the multi-member district. Resigned.	1993–2003; All of Swain County. Parts of Macon, Jackson, Haywood, Transylvania, and Henderson counties.
Vacant		January 1, 1997 – January 10, 1997		1993–2003; All of Swain County. Parts of Macon, Jackson, Haywood, Transylvania, and Henderson counties.
Thomas Jenkins (Franklin)	Democratic	January 10, 1997 – January 1, 1999	Appointed to finish Plexico's term. Retired.	1993–2003; All of Swain County. Parts of Macon, Jackson, Haywood, Transylvania, and Henderson counties.
Dan Robinson (Cullowhee)	Democratic	January 1, 1999 – January 1, 2003	Redistricted to the 50th district and lost re-election.	1993–2003; All of Swain County. Parts of Macon, Jackson, Haywood, Transylvania, and Henderson counties.
Jerry Tillman (Archdale)	Republican	January 1, 2003 – January 1, 2019	Redistricted to the 26th district.	2003–2013; All of Randolph and Montgomery counties.
Jerry Tillman (Archdale)	Republican	January 1, 2003 – January 1, 2019	Redistricted to the 26th district.	2013–2019; All of Moore County. Part of Randolph County.
Eddie Gallimore (Thomasville)	Republican	January 1, 2019 – January 1, 2021	Lost re-nomination.	2019–2023; All of Davidson and Montgomery counties.
Steve Jarvis (Lexington)	Republican	January 1, 2021 – January 1, 2023	Redistricted to the 30th district.	2019–2023; All of Davidson and Montgomery counties.
Dave Craven (Asheboro)	Republican	January 1, 2023 – Present	Redistricted from the 26th district.	2023–Present; All of Montgomery, Richmond, Anson counties. Parts of Randolph and Union counties.

== Election results ==
=== 2024 ===
North Carolina Senate 29th district general election, 2024
Party	Candidate	Votes	%
Republican	Dave Craven (incumbent)	70,881	68.55%
Democratic	Kevin Clark	32,519	31.45%
Total votes		103,400	100%
Republican hold			

=== 2022 ===
North Carolina Senate 29th district general election, 2022
Party	Candidate	Votes	%
Republican	Dave Craven (incumbent)	51,618	73.05%
Democratic	Brooke Crump	19,048	26.95%
Total votes		70,666	100%
Republican hold			

=== 2020 ===
North Carolina Senate 29th district Republican primary election, 2020
Party	Candidate	Votes	%
Republican	Steve Jarvis	11,617	53.30%
Republican	Eddie Gallimore (incumbent)	10,179	46.70%
Total votes		21,796	100%

North Carolina Senate 29th district general election, 2020
Party	Candidate	Votes	%
Republican	Steve Jarvis	74,210	74.49%
Democratic	Duskin Lassiter	25,409	25.51%
Total votes		99,619	100%
Republican hold			

=== 2018 ===
North Carolina Senate 29th district Republican primary election, 2018
Party	Candidate	Votes	%
Republican	Eddie Gallimore	11,775	55.48%
Republican	Sam Watford	9,448	44.52%
Total votes		21,223	100%

North Carolina Senate 29th district general election, 2018
Party	Candidate	Votes	%
Republican	Eddie Gallimore	46,974	71.64%
Democratic	Cheraton Love	18,594	28.36%
Total votes		65,568	100%
Republican hold			

=== 2016 ===
North Carolina Senate 29th district general election, 2016
Party	Candidate	Votes	%
Republican	Jerry Tillman (incumbent)	71,648	100%
Total votes		71,648	100%
Republican hold			

=== 2014 ===
North Carolina Senate 29th district general election, 2014
Party	Candidate	Votes	%
Republican	Jerry Tillman (incumbent)	41,100	70.86%
Democratic	Tommy Davis	16,901	29.14%
Total votes		58,001	100%
Republican hold			

=== 2012 ===
North Carolina Senate 29th district Republican primary election, 2012
Party	Candidate	Votes	%
Republican	Jerry Tillman (incumbent)	18,285	67.10%
Republican	John Marcum	4,699	17.24%
Republican	Tommy Davis	4,266	15.66%
Total votes		27,250	100%

North Carolina Senate 29th district general election, 2012
Party	Candidate	Votes	%
Republican	Jerry Tillman (incumbent)	65,000	100%
Total votes		65,000	100%
Republican hold			

=== 2010 ===
North Carolina Senate 29th district general election, 2010
Party	Candidate	Votes	%
Republican	Jerry Tillman (incumbent)	31,791	100%
Total votes		31,791	100%
Republican hold			

=== 2008 ===
North Carolina Senate 29th district general election, 2008
Party	Candidate	Votes	%
Republican	Jerry Tillman (incumbent)	45,614	68.00%
Democratic	Ronald Franklin	21,316	31.78%
Write-in		146	0.22%
Total votes		67,076	100%
Republican hold			

=== 2006 ===
North Carolina Senate 29th district general election, 2006
Party	Candidate	Votes	%
Republican	Jerry Tillman (incumbent)	24,005	100%
Total votes		24,005	100%
Republican hold			

=== 2004 ===
North Carolina Senate 29th district Republican primary election, 2004
Party	Candidate	Votes	%
Republican	Jerry Tillman (incumbent)	5,144	59.80%
Republican	Joe O. Shaw	3,458	40.20%
Total votes		8,602	100%

North Carolina Senate 29th district general election, 2004
Party	Candidate	Votes	%
Republican	Jerry Tillman (incumbent)	42,292	70.56%
Democratic	Charles K. Moss	17,644	29.44%
Total votes		59,936	100%
Republican hold			

=== 2002 ===
North Carolina Senate 29th district Democratic primary election, 2002
Party	Candidate	Votes	%
Democratic	Mac Whatley	3,864	64.50%
Democratic	Charles K. Moss	2,127	35.50%
Total votes		5,991	100%

North Carolina Senate 29th district Republican primary election, 2002
Party	Candidate	Votes	%
Republican	Jerry Tillman	6,616	46.26%
Republican	Bob Crumley	3,509	24.54%
Republican	Joe O. Shaw	3,314	23.17%
Republican	Max Gardner Reece Jr.	862	6.03%
Total votes		14,301	100%

North Carolina Senate 29th district general election, 2002
Party	Candidate	Votes	%
Republican	Jerry Tillman	24,972	64.64%
Democratic	Mac Whatley	12,932	33.47%
Libertarian	Douglas Kania	728	1.88%
Total votes		38,632	100%
Republican win (new seat)			

=== 2000 ===
North Carolina Senate 29th district general election, 2000
Party	Candidate	Votes	%
Democratic	Dan Robinson (incumbent)	31,633	51.33%
Republican	Judith C. Fraser	29,991	48.67%
Total votes		61,624	100%
Democratic hold			
