= Jerry W. Tillman =

American politician from North Carolina (1940–2023)

Jerry Tillman
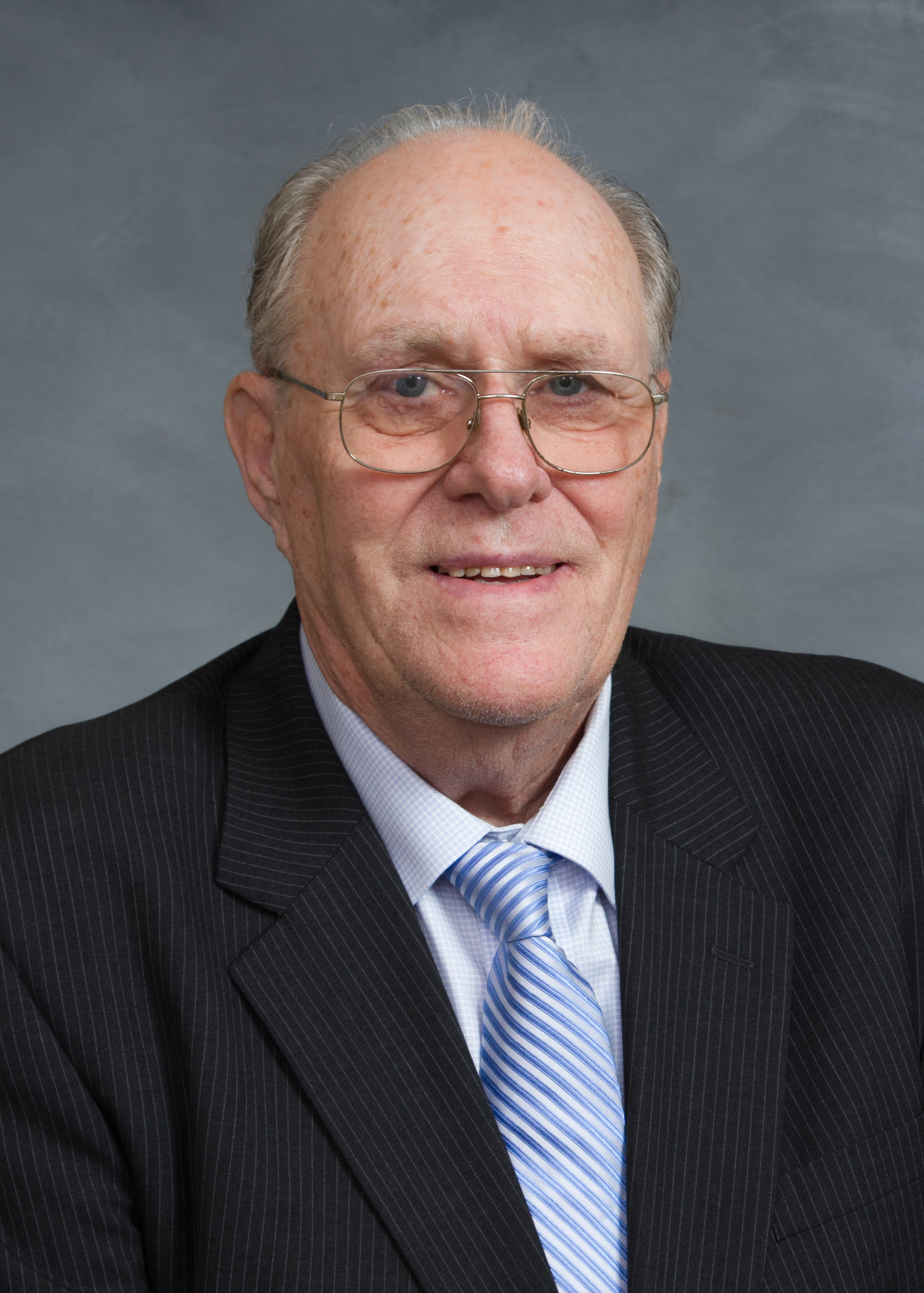

Majority Whip of the North Carolina Senate
- In office January 26, 2011 – June 30, 2020
- Preceded by: Katie G. Dorsett
- Succeeded by: Rick Gunn

Member of the North Carolina Senate
- In office January 1, 2003 – June 30, 2020
- Preceded by: Constituency established
- Succeeded by: Dave Craven
- Constituency: 29th district (2003–2019); 26th district (2019–2020)

Personal details
- Born: October 10, 1940 Archdale, North Carolina, U.S.
- Died: February 4, 2023 (aged 82)
- Party: Republican
- Spouse: Marian Tillman
- Education: Elon University; University of North Carolina at Greensboro
- Profession: School administrator

Jerry W. Tillman (October 10, 1940 – February 4, 2023) was an American politician who was a Republican member of the North Carolina General Assembly, representing the state's twenty-sixth Senate district, including constituents in Guilford and Randolph counties. Tillman was a retired teacher, coach and school administrator from Archdale, North Carolina, and also served as the Randolph County GOP Chair. Tillman was first elected to the North Carolina Senate in 2003. He was the Senate Majority Whip and was Chair or Co-Chair of several committees during his tenure. In 2013, Senator Tillman co-authored and introduced the state's "voting reform act" to require photo ID to vote. He served nine terms in the State Senate before retiring on June 30, 2020, citing his age. Tillman's vacant seat was filled by Dave Craven. Tillman died in Greensboro, North Carolina of natural causes on February 4, 2023.

North Carolina Senate
Preceded by Dan Robinson	Member of the North Carolina Senate from the 29th district 2003–2019	Succeeded by Eddie Gallimore
Preceded by Phil Berger	Member of the North Carolina Senate from the 26th district 2019–2020	Succeeded by Dave Craven
Preceded by Katie G. Dorsett	Majority Whip of the North Carolina Senate; 2011–2020	Succeeded by Rick Gunn
