= Blair Eddins =

American politician from North Carolina

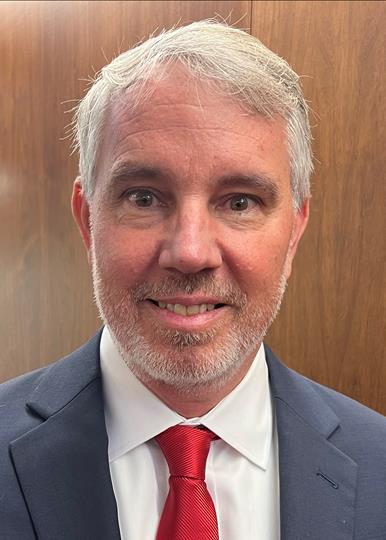

Member of the North Carolina House of Representatives from the 94th district
- Incumbent
- Assumed office October 1, 2024
- Preceded by: Jeffrey Elmore

Personal details
- Party: Republican
- Spouse: Angie
- Children: 2
- Education: North Carolina State University

Blair Eddins is an American politician who has served as a Republican member of the North Carolina House of Representatives from the 94th district since 2024.

== Electoral history ==
=== 2024 ===
North Carolina House of Representatives 94th district Republican primary election, 2024
Party	Candidate	Votes	%
Republican	Blair Eddins	6,869	43.31%
Republican	Stoney Greene	4,922	31.04%
Republican	Larry Yoder	2,628	16.57%
Republican	Dwight Shook	1,440	9.08%
Total votes		15,859	100%

North Carolina House of Representatives 94th district general election, 2024
Party	Candidate	Votes	%
Republican	Blair Eddins (incumbent)	35,329	76.97%
Democratic	Steve Moree	10,573	23.03%
Total votes		45,902	100%
Republican hold			

North Carolina House of Representatives
Preceded by Jeffrey Elmore	Member of the North Carolina House of Representatives from the 94th district 2024–Present	Incumbent
