= North Carolina's 15th House district =

American legislative district

North Carolina's 15th State House of Representatives district
Representative
Phil Shepard; R–Jacksonville
- Demographics: 63% White; 13% Black; 13% Hispanic; 2% Asian; 1% Other; 7% Multiracial
- Population (2024): 91,834

North Carolina's 15th House district is one of 120 districts in the North Carolina House of Representatives. It has been represented by Republican Phil Shepard since 2011.

== Geography ==
Since 2003, the district has included part of Onslow County. The district overlaps with the 6th Senate district.

== District officeholders ==
=== Multi-member district ===
Representative	Party	Dates	Notes	Representative	Party	Dates	Notes	Representative	Party	Dates	Notes	Representative	Party	Dates	Notes	Representative	Party	Dates	Notes	Representative	Party	Dates	Notes	Counties
District created January 1, 1967.
William Britt (Smithfield)	Democratic	January 1, 1967 – January 1, 1971	Redistricted from the Johnston County district.	Barney Paul Woodard (Princeton)	Democratic	January 1, 1967 – January 1, 1969		J. Ernest Paschall (Wilson)	Democratic	January 1, 1967 – January 1, 1973	Redistricted from the Wilson County district.													1967–1973; All of Johnston and Wilson counties.
William Britt (Smithfield)	Democratic	January 1, 1967 – January 1, 1971	Redistricted from the Johnston County district.	A. Hartwell Campbell (Wilson)	Democratic	January 1, 1969 – January 1, 1971		J. Ernest Paschall (Wilson)	Democratic	January 1, 1967 – January 1, 1973	Redistricted from the Wilson County district.													1967–1973; All of Johnston and Wilson counties.
Jack Gardner (Smithfield)	Democratic	January 1, 1971 – January 1, 1973	Redistricted to the 14th district.	J. Marvin Johnson (Smithfield)	Democratic	January 1, 1971 – January 1, 1973		J. Ernest Paschall (Wilson)	Democratic	January 1, 1967 – January 1, 1973	Redistricted from the Wilson County district.													1967–1973; All of Johnston and Wilson counties.
Howard Twiggs (Raleigh)	Democratic	January 1, 1973 – January 1, 1975	Redistricted from the 19th district.	Samuel Johnson (Raleigh)	Democratic	January 1, 1973 – January 1, 1975	Redistricted from the 19th district.	Robert Farmer (Raleigh)	Democratic	January 1, 1973 – December 14, 1977	Redistricted from the 19th district.	Robert Wynne (Raleigh)	Democratic	January 1, 1973 – January 1, 1975	Redistricted from the 19th district.	Wade Smith (Raleigh)	Democratic	January 1, 1973 – January 1, 1977		Ward Purrington (Raleigh)	Republican	January 1, 1973 – January 1, 1975		1973–1983; All of Wake County.
William Creech (Raleigh)	Democratic	January 1, 1975 – January 1, 1979	Retired to run for State Senate.	Joseph Johnson (Raleigh)	Democratic	January 1, 1975 – January 1, 1981	Retired to run for State Senate.	Robert Farmer (Raleigh)	Democratic	January 1, 1973 – December 14, 1977	Redistricted from the 19th district.	Allen Adams (Raleigh)	Democratic	January 1, 1975 – January 1, 1983	Redistricted to the 21st district.	Wade Smith (Raleigh)	Democratic	January 1, 1973 – January 1, 1977		Ruth Cook (Raleigh)	Democratic	January 1, 1975 – January 1, 1983	Redistricted to the 21st district.	1973–1983; All of Wake County.
William Creech (Raleigh)	Democratic	January 1, 1975 – January 1, 1979	Retired to run for State Senate.	Joseph Johnson (Raleigh)	Democratic	January 1, 1975 – January 1, 1981	Retired to run for State Senate.	Robert Farmer (Raleigh)	Democratic	January 1, 1973 – December 14, 1977	Redistricted from the 19th district.	Allen Adams (Raleigh)	Democratic	January 1, 1975 – January 1, 1983	Redistricted to the 21st district.	W. Casper Holroyd Jr. (Raleigh)	Democratic	January 1, 1977 – January 1, 1981		Ruth Cook (Raleigh)	Democratic	January 1, 1975 – January 1, 1983	Redistricted to the 21st district.	1973–1983; All of Wake County.
William Creech (Raleigh)	Democratic	January 1, 1975 – January 1, 1979	Retired to run for State Senate.	Joseph Johnson (Raleigh)	Democratic	January 1, 1975 – January 1, 1981	Retired to run for State Senate.	Vacant		December 14, 1977 – January 18, 1978		Allen Adams (Raleigh)	Democratic	January 1, 1975 – January 1, 1983	Redistricted to the 21st district.	W. Casper Holroyd Jr. (Raleigh)	Democratic	January 1, 1977 – January 1, 1981		Ruth Cook (Raleigh)	Democratic	January 1, 1975 – January 1, 1983	Redistricted to the 21st district.	1973–1983; All of Wake County.
William Creech (Raleigh)	Democratic	January 1, 1975 – January 1, 1979	Retired to run for State Senate.	Joseph Johnson (Raleigh)	Democratic	January 1, 1975 – January 1, 1981	Retired to run for State Senate.	Wilma Woodard (Raleigh)	Democratic	January 18, 1978 – January 1, 1983	Appointed to finish Farmer's term. Redistricted to the 21st district and retired to run for State Senate.	Allen Adams (Raleigh)	Democratic	January 1, 1975 – January 1, 1983	Redistricted to the 21st district.	W. Casper Holroyd Jr. (Raleigh)	Democratic	January 1, 1977 – January 1, 1981		Ruth Cook (Raleigh)	Democratic	January 1, 1975 – January 1, 1983	Redistricted to the 21st district.	1973–1983; All of Wake County.
Aaron Fussell (Raleigh)	Democratic	January 1, 1979 – January 1, 1983	Redistricted to the 21st district.	Joseph Johnson (Raleigh)	Democratic	January 1, 1975 – January 1, 1981	Retired to run for State Senate.	Wilma Woodard (Raleigh)	Democratic	January 18, 1978 – January 1, 1983	Appointed to finish Farmer's term. Redistricted to the 21st district and retired to run for State Senate.	Allen Adams (Raleigh)	Democratic	January 1, 1975 – January 1, 1983	Redistricted to the 21st district.	W. Casper Holroyd Jr. (Raleigh)	Democratic	January 1, 1977 – January 1, 1981		Ruth Cook (Raleigh)	Democratic	January 1, 1975 – January 1, 1983	Redistricted to the 21st district.	1973–1983; All of Wake County.
Aaron Fussell (Raleigh)	Democratic	January 1, 1979 – January 1, 1983	Redistricted to the 21st district.	Dan Blue (Raleigh)	Democratic	January 1, 1981 – January 1, 1983	Redistricted to the 21st district.	Wilma Woodard (Raleigh)	Democratic	January 18, 1978 – January 1, 1983	Appointed to finish Farmer's term. Redistricted to the 21st district and retired to run for State Senate.	Allen Adams (Raleigh)	Democratic	January 1, 1975 – January 1, 1983	Redistricted to the 21st district.	Marvin Musselwhite Jr. (Raleigh)	Democratic	January 1, 1981 – January 1, 1983	Redistricted to the 21st district.	Ruth Cook (Raleigh)	Democratic	January 1, 1975 – January 1, 1983	Redistricted to the 21st district.	1973–1983; All of Wake County.

=== Single-member district ===
Representative	Party	Dates	Notes	Counties
Richard Wright (Tabor City)	Democratic	January 1, 1983 – January 1, 1989	Redistricted from the 19th district.	1983–1993; All of Columbus County.
Leo Mercer (Chadbourn)	Democratic	January 1, 1989 – January 1, 1993	Redistricted to the 14th district and retired.	1983–1993; All of Columbus County.
Sam Ellis (Garner)	Republican	January 1, 1993 – January 1, 2003	Redistricted to the 39th district.	1993–2003; Part of Wake County.
Robert Grady (Jacksonville)	Republican	January 1, 2003 – January 1, 2011	Redistricted from the 80th district. Retired.	2003–Present; Parts of Onslow County.
Phil Shepard (Jacksonville)	Republican	January 1, 2011 – Present		2003–Present; Parts of Onslow County.

== Election results ==
=== 2024 ===
North Carolina House of Representatives 15th district general election, 2024
Party	Candidate	Votes	%
Republican	Phil Shepard (incumbent)	24,184	63.85%
Democratic	Christopher Schulte	11,799	31.15%
Libertarian	Matthew Feehan	1,894	5.00%
Total votes		37,877	100%
Republican hold			

=== 2022 ===
North Carolina House of Representatives 15th district general election, 2022
Party	Candidate	Votes	%
Republican	Phil Shepard (incumbent)	14,512	68.06%
Democratic	Christopher Schulte	6,810	31.94%
Total votes		21,322	100%
Republican hold			

=== 2020 ===
North Carolina House of Representatives 15th district Republican primary election, 2020
Party	Candidate	Votes	%
Republican	Phil Shepard (incumbent)	4,024	72.17%
Republican	Mark Price	1,552	27.83%
Total votes		5,576	100%

North Carolina House of Representatives 15th district general election, 2020
Party	Candidate	Votes	%
Republican	Phil Shepard (incumbent)	17,818	69.49%
Democratic	Carolyn F. Gomas	7,824	30.51%
Total votes		25,642	100%
Republican hold			

=== 2018 ===
North Carolina House of Representatives 15th district general election, 2018
Party	Candidate	Votes	%
Republican	Phil Shepard (incumbent)	9,076	66.38%
Democratic	Dan Whitten	4,596	33.62%
Total votes		13,672	100%
Republican hold			

=== 2016 ===
North Carolina House of Representatives 15th district general election, 2016
Party	Candidate	Votes	%
Republican	Phil Shepard (incumbent)	13,273	69.60%
Democratic	Dan Whitten	5,797	30.40%
Total votes		19,070	100%
Republican hold			

=== 2014 ===
North Carolina House of Representatives 15th district Republican primary election, 2014
Party	Candidate	Votes	%
Republican	Phil Shepard (incumbent)	3,282	79.31%
Republican	Jim Morton	856	20.69%
Total votes		4,138	100%

North Carolina House of Representatives 15th district general election, 2014
Party	Candidate	Votes	%
Republican	Phil Shepard (incumbent)	8,221	100%
Total votes		8,221	100%
Republican hold			

=== 2012 ===
North Carolina House of Representatives 15th district general election, 2012
Party	Candidate	Votes	%
Republican	Phil Shepard (incumbent)	12,111	100%
Total votes		12,111	100%
Republican hold			

=== 2010 ===
North Carolina House of Representatives 15th district Republican primary election, 2010
Party	Candidate	Votes	%
Republican	Phil Shepard	1,311	43.88%
Republican	Martin Aragona Jr.	1,090	36.48%
Republican	Tracey Louise Miller	587	19.65%
Total votes		2,988	100%

North Carolina House of Representatives 15th district general election, 2010
Party	Candidate	Votes	%
Republican	Phil Shepard	5,873	76.64%
Independent	George Shaeffer	1,790	23.36%
Total votes		7,663	100%
Republican hold			

=== 2008 ===
North Carolina House of Representatives 15th district Republican primary election, 2008
Party	Candidate	Votes	%
Republican	Robert Grady (incumbent)	1,474	63.53%
Republican	George Shaeffer	846	36.47%
Total votes		2,320	100%

North Carolina House of Representatives 15th district general election, 2008
Party	Candidate	Votes	%
Republican	Robert Grady (incumbent)	11,015	100%
Total votes		11,015	100%
Republican hold			

=== 2006 ===
North Carolina House of Representatives 15th district Republican primary election, 2006
Party	Candidate	Votes	%
Republican	Robert Grady (incumbent)	378	69.23%
Republican	George Shaeffer	168	30.77%
Total votes		546	100%

North Carolina House of Representatives 15th district general election, 2006
Party	Candidate	Votes	%
Republican	Robert Grady (incumbent)	3,920	61.88%
Democratic	Jean Hawley	2,415	38.12%
Total votes		6,335	100%
Republican hold			

=== 2004 ===
North Carolina House of Representatives 15th district general election, 2004
Party	Candidate	Votes	%
Republican	Robert Grady (incumbent)	9,196	100%
Total votes		9,196	100%
Republican hold			

=== 2002 ===
North Carolina House of Representatives 15th district general election, 2002
Party	Candidate	Votes	%
Republican	Robert Grady (incumbent)	8,988	70.81%
Democratic	Jerome Willingham	3,705	29.19%
Total votes		12,693	100%
Republican hold			

=== 2000 ===
North Carolina House of Representatives 15th district Democratic primary election, 2000
Party	Candidate	Votes	%
Democratic	Thomas Hunt	2,035	51.77%
Democratic	Isaac L. "Skip" Blaylock	1,896	48.23%
Total votes		3,931	100%

North Carolina House of Representatives 15th district general election, 2000
Party	Candidate	Votes	%
Republican	Sam Ellis (incumbent)	21,286	58.60%
Democratic	Thomas Hunt	15,041	41.40%
Total votes		36,327	100%
Republican hold			
