= Dave Craven =

American politician from North Carolina

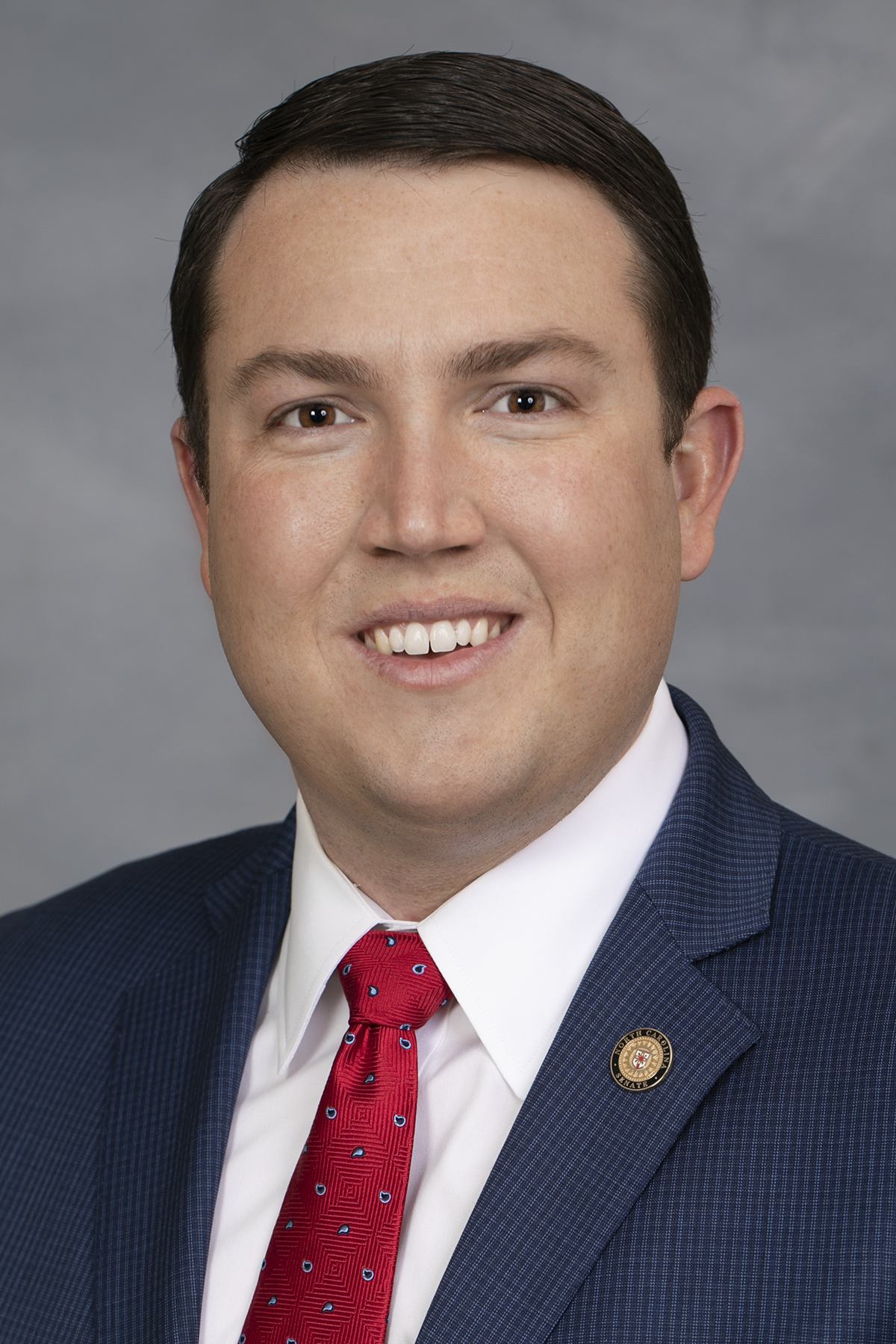

Member of the North Carolina Senate
- Incumbent
- Assumed office July 17, 2020
- Preceded by: Jerry W. Tillman
- Constituency: 26th district (2020–2023); 29th district (2023–present)

Personal details
- Born: c. 1990 (age 35–36) Randolph County, North Carolina, U.S.
- Party: Republican
- Education: University of North Carolina at Charlotte

David W. Craven Jr. (born c. 1990) is a North Carolina politician. A Republican, he has served in the North Carolina Senate since he was appointed in 2020 to fill the vacancy caused by Jerry W. Tillman's resignation. He has represented the 29th district since 2023, having previously represented the 26th district from 2020 to 2023.

== Early life and education ==
Craven was born around 1990 in Randolph County, North Carolina. Craven earned a bachelor's degree from the University of North Carolina at Charlotte and was the student body president during his time there.

== Career ==
In 2016, Craven became a board member of the Economic Development Partnership of North Carolina. On June 30, 2020, North Carolina State Senator Jerry W. Tillman resigned from his position, both as a state senator, and as the Republican nominee in the general election for the same position. On July 14, 2020, Craven was selected by the Republican executive committee of North Carolina's 26th Senate district to replace Tillman. On July 17, 2020, Craven was appointed to fill Tillman's vacancy by Governor Roy Cooper. He also replaced Tillman as the Republican nominee. At the time he was appointed to the state senate, Craven served as senior vice president of Fidelity Bank, and as chairman of the Randolph County Republican Party. On November 3, 2020, Craven won the general election to stay in the state senate seat he was appointed to.

While in office, Craven proposed an amendment that would ban shrimp trawling within half a mile of the coast, saying that it would protect other species of fish from being accidentally caught and killed alongside the shrimp. The restriction passed the Senate with bipartisan support, with only four Senators opposing it, all coastal Republicans.

In 2026, it was discovered that more than a fifth of the $1.3 million that Craven's 2024 campaign raised had come from clients of one lobbyist, Kevin Wilkinson. At the same time, Craven's campaign became the first and only client of a consulting firm created by Wilkinson's wife Megan, leading some campaign finance watchdogs to accuse Craven of a quid pro quo setup. Craven denied the accusation, saying that Wilkinson was a family friend and genuinely assisted in planning events for his campaign. Following this accusation, state senator Terence Everitt called on the state auditor to investigate Craven's links to the Wilkinsons.

== Personal life ==
Craven lives in Asheboro, North Carolina. He is President of the Asheboro Rotary Club.

North Carolina Senate
Preceded by Jerry W. Tillman	Member of the North Carolina Senate from the 26th district 2020–2023	Succeeded by Phil Berger
Preceded by Steve Jarvis	Member of the North Carolina Senate from the 29th district 2023–present	Incumbent
