= North Carolina's 26th Senate district =

American legislative district

North Carolina's 26th State Senate district
Senator
Phil Berger; R–Eden
- Demographics: 66% White; 21% Black; 7% Hispanic; 2% Asian; 1% Other; 4% Multiracial
- Population (2023): 221,365

North Carolina's 26th Senate district is one of 50 districts in the North Carolina Senate. It has been represented by Republican Phil Berger since 2023. In the 2026 Republican primary for the seat, Berger currently trails his opponent, Sam Page, by a margin of 2 votes.

== Geography ==
Since 2023, the district has included all of Rockingham County, as well as part of Guilford County. The district overlaps with the 57th, 59th, 62nd, and 65th state house districts.

== District officeholders ==
=== Multi-member district ===
Senator	Party	Dates	Notes	Senator	Party	Dates	Notes	Counties
I. C. Crawford (Asheville)	Democratic	January 1, 1973 – January 24, 1979	Redistricted from the 31st district. Died.	Lamar Gudger (Asheville)	Democratic	January 1, 1973 – January 1, 1977	Redistricted from the 31st district. Retired to run for Congress.	1973–1983; All of Buncombe, Madison, Yancey, and McDowell counties.
I. C. Crawford (Asheville)	Democratic	January 1, 1973 – January 24, 1979	Redistricted from the 31st district. Died.	Robert Swain (Asheville)	Democratic	January 1, 1977 – January 1, 1983	Redistricted to the 28th district.	1973–1983; All of Buncombe, Madison, Yancey, and McDowell counties.
Vacant		January 24, 1979 – January 29, 1979		Robert Swain (Asheville)	Democratic	January 1, 1977 – January 1, 1983	Redistricted to the 28th district.	1973–1983; All of Buncombe, Madison, Yancey, and McDowell counties.
Larry Leake (Asheville)	Democratic	January 24, 1979 – January 1, 1981	Appointed to finish Crawford's term.	Robert Swain (Asheville)	Democratic	January 1, 1977 – January 1, 1983	Redistricted to the 28th district.	1973–1983; All of Buncombe, Madison, Yancey, and McDowell counties.
James McClure Clarke (Fairview)	Democratic	January 1, 1981 – January 1, 1983	Redistricted to the 28th district and retired to run for Congress.	Robert Swain (Asheville)	Democratic	January 1, 1977 – January 1, 1983	Redistricted to the 28th district.	1973–1983; All of Buncombe, Madison, Yancey, and McDowell counties.
Cass Ballenger (Hickory)	Republican	January 1, 1983 – November 4, 1986	Redistricted from the 23rd district. Resigned to assume seat in Congress.	William Walter Redman Jr. (Statesville)	Republican	January 1, 1983 – March 11, 1987	Redistricted from the 23rd district. Resigned.	1983–1993; All of Catawba, Alexander, Iredell, and Yadkin counties.
Vacant		November 4, 1986 – January 1, 1987		William Walter Redman Jr. (Statesville)	Republican	January 1, 1983 – March 11, 1987	Redistricted from the 23rd district. Resigned.	1983–1993; All of Catawba, Alexander, Iredell, and Yadkin counties.
Austin Allran (Hickory)	Republican	January 1, 1987 – January 1, 1993	Redistricted to the single-member district.	William Walter Redman Jr. (Statesville)	Republican	January 1, 1983 – March 11, 1987	Redistricted from the 23rd district. Resigned.	1983–1993; All of Catawba, Alexander, Iredell, and Yadkin counties.
Austin Allran (Hickory)	Republican	January 1, 1987 – January 1, 1993	Redistricted to the single-member district.	Vacant		March 11, 1987 – March 12, 1987		1983–1993; All of Catawba, Alexander, Iredell, and Yadkin counties.
Austin Allran (Hickory)	Republican	January 1, 1987 – January 1, 1993	Redistricted to the single-member district.	Howard Franklin Bryan (Statesville)	Republican	March 12, 1987 – January 1, 1993	Appointed to finish Redman's term. Redistricted to the 39th district.	1983–1993; All of Catawba, Alexander, Iredell, and Yadkin counties.

=== Single-member district ===
Senator	Party	Dates	Notes	Counties
Austin Allran (Hickory)	Republican	January 1, 1993 – January 1, 2003	Redistricted from the multi-member district. Redistricted to the 44th district.	1993–2003; All of Catawba County. Part of Lincoln County.
Phil Berger (Eden)	Republican	January 1, 2003 – January 1, 2019	Redistricted from the 12th district. Redistricted to the 30th district.	2003–2019; All of Rockingham County. Part of Guilford County.
Jerry Tillman (Archdale)	Republican	January 1, 2019 – June 30, 2020	Redistricted from the 29th district. Resigned.	2019–2023; All of Randolph County. Part of Guilford County.
Vacant		June 30, 2020 – July 17, 2020		2019–2023; All of Randolph County. Part of Guilford County.
Dave Craven (Asheboro)	Republican	July 17, 2020 – January 1, 2023	Appointed to finish Tillman's term. Redistricted to the 29th district.	2019–2023; All of Randolph County. Part of Guilford County.
Phil Berger (Eden)	Republican	January 1, 2023 – Present	Redistricted from the 30th district.	2023–Present; All of Rockingham County. Part of Guilford County.

== Election results ==
=== 2024 ===
North Carolina Senate 26th district general election, 2024
Party	Candidate	Votes	%
Republican	Phil Berger (incumbent)	67,081	54.06%
Democratic	Steve Luking	51,007	41.10%
Constitution	Alvin Robinson	6,007	4.84%
Total votes		124,095	100%
Republican hold			

=== 2022 ===
North Carolina Senate 26th district general election, 2022
Party	Candidate	Votes	%
Republican	Phil Berger (incumbent)	54,717	85.20%
Write-in		7,882	12.27%
Independent	Alvin Robinson (write-in)	1,624	2.53%
Total votes		64,223	100%
Republican hold			

=== 2020 ===
North Carolina Senate 26th district general election, 2020
Party	Candidate	Votes	%
Republican	Dave Craven (incumbent)	63,077	70.33%
Democratic	Jane Ledwell Gant	26,609	29.67%
Total votes		89,686	100%
Republican hold			

=== 2018 ===
North Carolina Senate 26th District general election, 2018
Party	Candidate	Votes	%
Republican	Jerry Tillman (incumbent)	39,103	64.83%
Democratic	William "Bill" McCaskill	21,217	35.17%
Total votes		60,320	100%
Republican hold			

=== 2016 ===
North Carolina Senate 26th district general election, 2016
Party	Candidate	Votes	%
Republican	Phil Berger (incumbent)	67,908	100%
Total votes		67,908	100%
Republican hold			

=== 2014 ===
North Carolina Senate 26th district general election, 2014
Party	Candidate	Votes	%
Republican	Phil Berger (incumbent)	40,352	59.17%
Democratic	William Osborne	27,845	40.83%
Total votes		68,197	100%
Republican hold			

=== 2012 ===
North Carolina Senate 26th district Republican primary election, 2012
Party	Candidate	Votes	%
Republican	Phil Berger (incumbent)	19,414	87.11%
Republican	Bobby Coffer	2,874	12.89%
Total votes		22,288	100%

North Carolina Senate 26th district general election, 2012
Party	Candidate	Votes	%
Republican	Phil Berger (incumbent)	58,276	61.11%
Democratic	Bobby R. Stanley	37,092	38.89%
Total votes		95,368	100%
Republican hold			

=== 2010 ===
North Carolina Senate 26th district general election, 2010
Party	Candidate	Votes	%
Republican	Phil Berger (incumbent)	43,952	100%
Total votes		43,952	100%
Republican hold			

=== 2008 ===
North Carolina Senate 26th district general election, 2008
Party	Candidate	Votes	%
Republican	Phil Berger (incumbent)	65,392	100%
Total votes		65,392	100%
Republican hold			

=== 2006 ===
North Carolina Senate 26th district Democratic primary election, 2006
Party	Candidate	Votes	%
Democratic	Rick Miller	1,832	50.93%
Democratic	Ken Hux	1,765	49.07%
Total votes		3,597	100%

North Carolina Senate 26th district general election, 2006
Party	Candidate	Votes	%
Republican	Phil Berger (incumbent)	26,640	62.38%
Democratic	Rick Miller	16,064	37.62%
Total votes		42,704	100%
Republican hold			

=== 2004 ===
North Carolina Senate 26th district Republican primary election, 2004
Party	Candidate	Votes	%
Republican	Phil Berger (incumbent)	5,788	69.00%
Republican	Tim Sessoms	2,324	27.70%
Republican	Roger Erdely	277	3.30%
Total votes		8,389	100%

North Carolina Senate 26th district general election, 2004
Party	Candidate	Votes	%
Republican	Phil Berger (incumbent)	59,618	100%
Total votes		59,618	100%
Republican hold			

=== 2002 ===
North Carolina Senate 26th district Republican primary election, 2002
Party	Candidate	Votes	%
Republican	Phil Berger (incumbent)	4,580	52.82%
Republican	Robert G. "Bob" Shaw (incumbent)	4,091	47.18%
Total votes		8,671	100%

North Carolina Senate 26th district general election, 2002
Party	Candidate	Votes	%
Republican	Phil Berger (incumbent)	40,187	84.69%
Libertarian	Jim Capo	7,264	15.31%
Total votes		47,451	100%
Republican hold			

=== 2000 ===
North Carolina Senate 26th district general election, 2000
Party	Candidate	Votes	%
Republican	Austin Allran (incumbent)	44,328	100%
Total votes		44,328	100%
Republican hold			
