= W. Robert Grady =

American politician from North Carolina

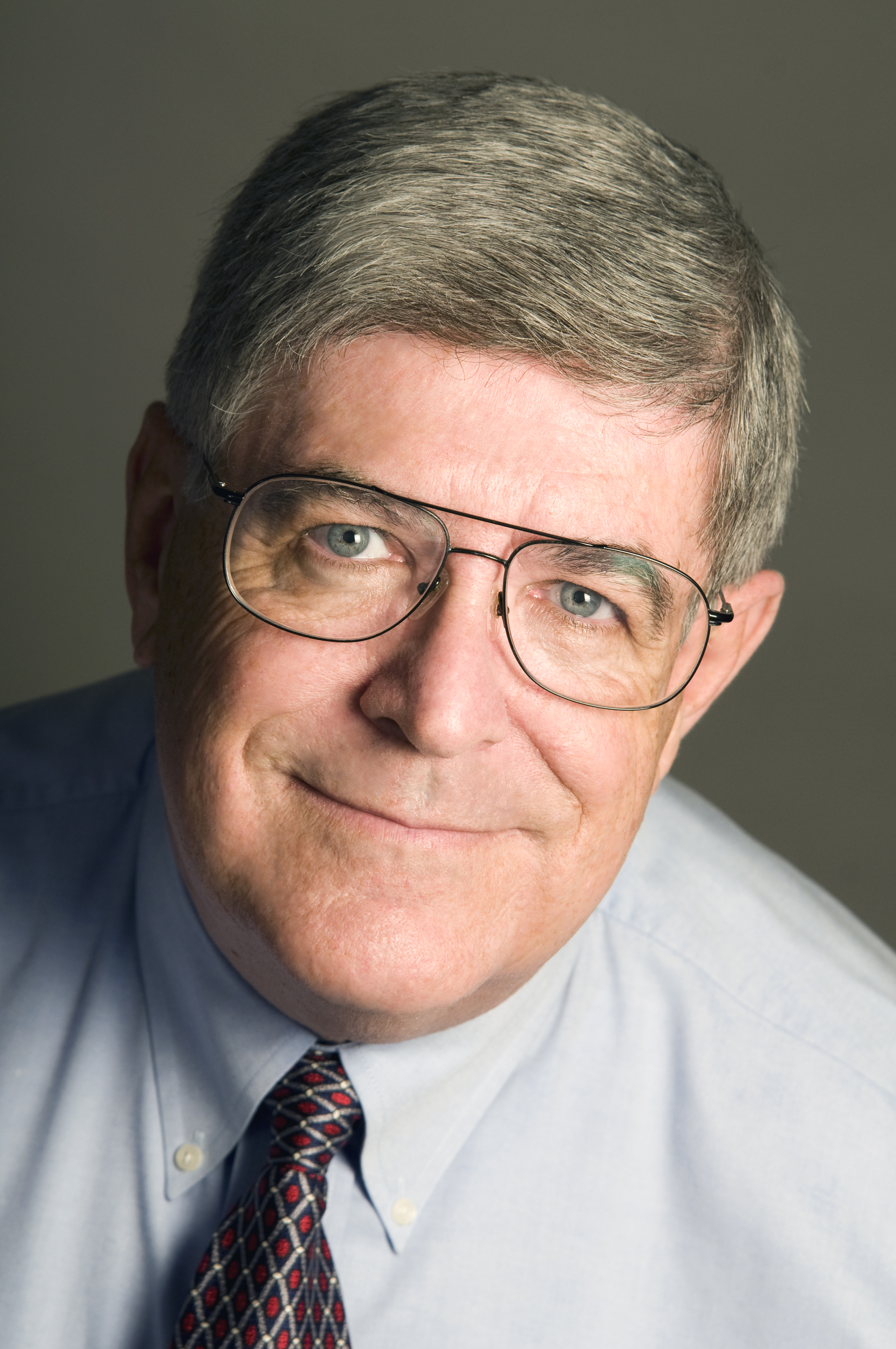

Member of the North Carolina House of Representatives
- In office January 1, 1987 – January 1, 2011
- Preceded by: Gerald Barry Hurst
- Succeeded by: Phil Shepard
- Constituency: 4th District (1987-1993); 80th District (1993-2003); 15th District (2003-2011)

Personal details
- Born: William Robert Grady; April 30, 1950 (age 76) Jacksonville, North Carolina
- Party: Republican
- Occupation: Businessman

William Robert Grady (born April 30, 1950) was an American Republican party member of the North Carolina House of Representatives representing the state's fifteenth House district, including constituents in Onslow County. A businessman from Jacksonville, North Carolina, Grady served twelve two-year terms, the last one of which was the 2009-2010 session. He did not stand for election in 2010.

He was the mayor pro tempore of Jacksonville from 1983 to 1986 and was a member of the Jacksonville City Council from 1981 to 1987.

== Early life and education ==
He was born in Jacksonville, North Carolina, on April 30, 1950, to William R. and Minne (née Hurst) Grady. His mother’s family – the Hursts – had lived in Onslow County on a farm that is now part of Camp Lejeune for generations; his father, after serving in World War II moved to Onslow County to work at Camp Davis and, later, Camp Lejeune.

Robert attended public schools, graduating from Jacksonville High School, then attending the University of North Carolina at Chapel Hill. He graduated with a BA degree in history and, later, received a second degree in history (with honors) from Campbell University.

== Political career ==
Robert was elected to the Jacksonville City Council in 1981, serving three terms, including two as Mayor Pro Tem. He was elected to the North Carolina House of Representatives in 1986, becoming one of the first Republicans elected to the legislature from Eastern North Carolina. While serving in the House he specialized in Education and the Judiciary, serving on the appropriations committee for Crime Control and Public Safety, which oversees the judiciary, clerks of court offices, prisons, and state law enforcement (the highway patrol, alcohol law enforcement, the SBI and prisons).

He has also served on the appropriations committee for Education which funds the public schools, community colleges and universities, as well as providing state funding for private colleges (Legislative Tuition Grant) and charter schools.

He sponsored legislation to teach university level courses at community colleges and to insure that the academic credits students earn at community colleges will transfer to universities if a student decides to continue his or her education.

As a result of his efforts Coastal Carolina Community College and UNC-Wilmington established one of the first programs that allows students to receive a 4-year degree from UNC-W – without ever leaving Onslow County. Both programs were praised as examples of reducing costs, providing more convenient services and saving taxpayers money.

In the House, Grady also sponsored legislation to establish the Veteran’s Cemetery in Jacksonville and fought, over three sessions, to pass legislation to force the state to refund taxes the government had improperly collected from retired veterans and federal employees. (The state tried to use a technicality to try to keep the retirees’ money).

A popular legislator, Grady was elected and reelected 12 times by large margins. In January, he announced he would not seek reelection and, instead, would run for Onslow County Clerk of Court.

== Personal life ==
Robert Grady was married to his wife, Neta Lucas Grady, for 36 years.

North Carolina House of Representatives
Preceded by Gerald Barry Hurst	Member of the North Carolina House of Representatives from the 4th district 1987–1993; Served alongside: Wilbur Bruce Ethridge, James Paul Tyndall, William Donald Mills, Ronald Linwood Smith	Succeeded by Jean Rouse Preston; Ronald Linwood Smith
Preceded by Constituency established	Member of the North Carolina House of Representatives from the 80th district 1993–2003	Succeeded by Jerry Dockham
Preceded by Sam Ellis	Member of the North Carolina House of Representatives from the 15th district 2003–2011	Succeeded by Phil Shepard
