= Phil Shepard =

American politician (born 1954)

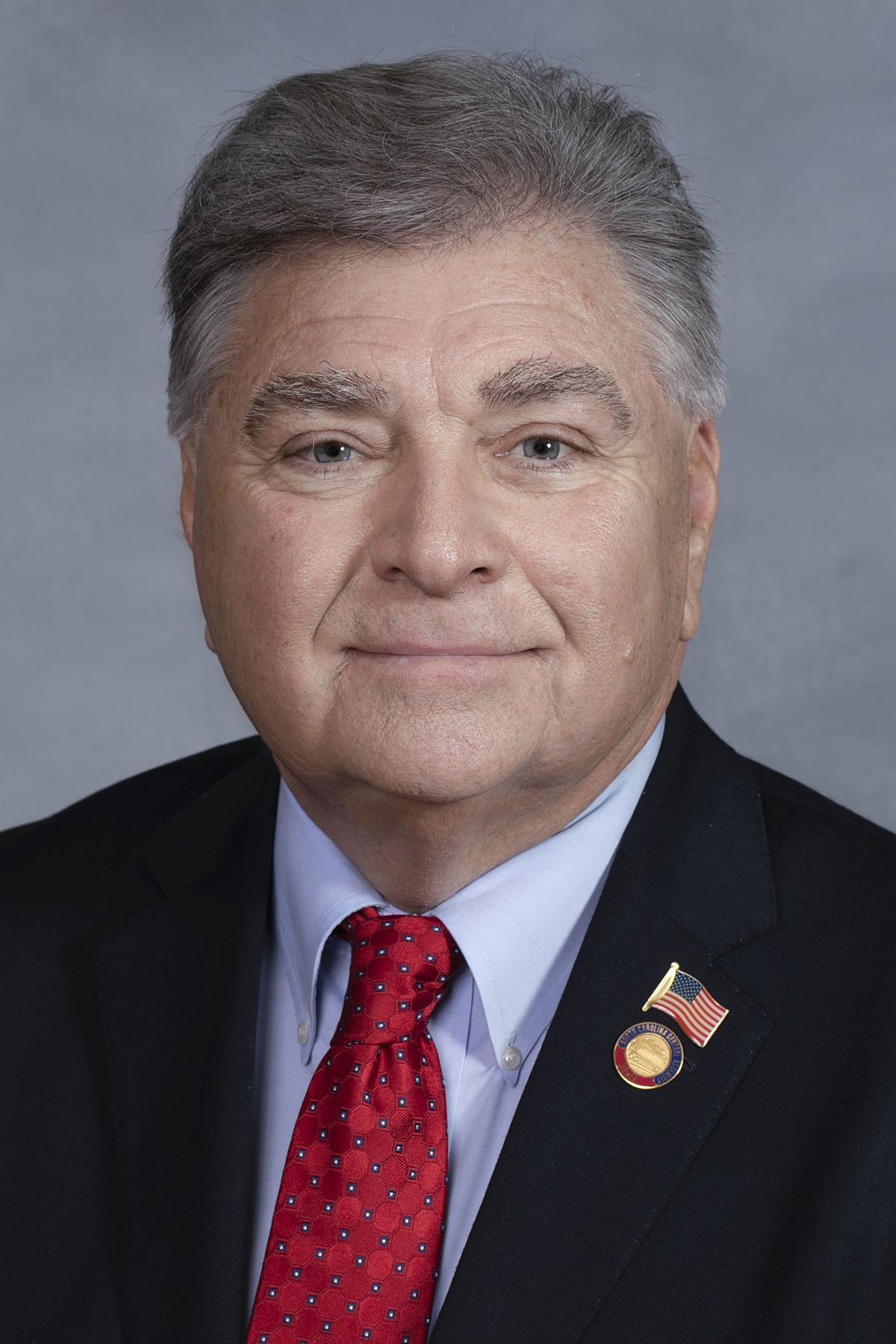

Member of the North Carolina House of Representatives from the 15th district
- Incumbent
- Assumed office January 1, 2011
- Preceded by: Robert Grady

Personal details
- Born: Phillip Ray Shepard; November 10, 1954 (age 71) Jacksonville, North Carolina, U.S.
- Party: Republican
- Education: Coastal Carolina Community College
- Occupation: Pastor

Phillip Ray Shepard (born November 10, 1954) is a Republican member of the North Carolina General Assembly. He represents the 15th district.

== Electoral history ==
=== 2020 ===
North Carolina House of Representatives 15th district general election, 2020
Party	Candidate	Votes	%
Republican	Phil Shepard (incumbent)	17,818	69.49%
Democratic	Carolyn F. Gomas	7,824	30.51%
Total votes		25,642	100%
Republican hold			

=== 2018 ===
North Carolina House of Representatives 15th district general election, 2018
Party	Candidate	Votes	%
Republican	Phil Shepard (incumbent)	9,076	66.38%
Democratic	Dan Whitten	4,596	33.62%
Total votes		13,672	100%
Republican hold			

=== 2016 ===
North Carolina House of Representatives 15th district general election, 2016
Party	Candidate	Votes	%
Republican	Phil Shepard (incumbent)	13,273	69.60%
Democratic	Dan Whitten	5,797	30.40%
Total votes		19,070	100%
Republican hold			

=== 2014 ===
North Carolina House of Representatives 15th district general election, 2014
Party	Candidate	Votes	%
Republican	Phil Shepard (incumbent)	8,221	100%
Total votes		8,221	100%
Republican hold			

=== 2012 ===
North Carolina House of Representatives 15th district general election, 2012
Party	Candidate	Votes	%
Republican	Phil Shepard (incumbent)	12,111	100%
Total votes		12,111	100%
Republican hold			

=== 2010 ===
North Carolina House of Representatives 15th district general election, 2010
Party	Candidate	Votes	%
Republican	Phil Shepard	5,873	76.64%
Unaffaliated	George Shaeffer	1,790	23.36%
Total votes		7,663	100%
Republican hold			

== Committee assignments ==
=== 2021-2022 session ===
- Appropriations (Vice Chair)
- Appropriations - Transportation (Chair)
- Commerce
- Education - K-12
- Health
- Homeland Security, Military, and Veterans Affairs
- Transportation (Chair)

=== 2019-2020 session ===
- Appropriations (Vice Chair)
- Appropriations - Transportation (Chair)
- Commerce
- Health
- Homeland Security, Military, and Veterans Affairs
- Transportation (Chair)

=== 2017-2018 session ===
- Appropriations (Vice Chair)
- Appropriations - Transportation (Chair)
- Commerce and Job Development
- Education - K-12
- Health
- Homeland Security, Military, and Veterans Affairs
- Transportation (Chair)

=== 2015-2016 session ===
- Appropriations (Vice Chair)
- Appropriations - Transportation (Chair)
- Commerce and Job Development
- Homeland Security, Military, and Veterans Affairs
- Transportation (Chair)
- Education - Community Colleges
- Insurance

=== 2013-2014 session ===
- Appropriations (Vice Chair)
- Commerce and Job Development (Vice Chair)
- Transportation (Vice Chair)
- Education
- Insurance
- Regulatory Reform

=== 2011-2012 session ===
- Appropriations
- Commerce and Job Development (Vice Chair)
- Education
- Insurance
- Banking

North Carolina House of Representatives
Preceded by Robert Grady	Member of the North Carolina House of Representatives from the 15th district 2011-Present	Incumbent
