= Jeffrey Elmore =

American politician from North Carolina

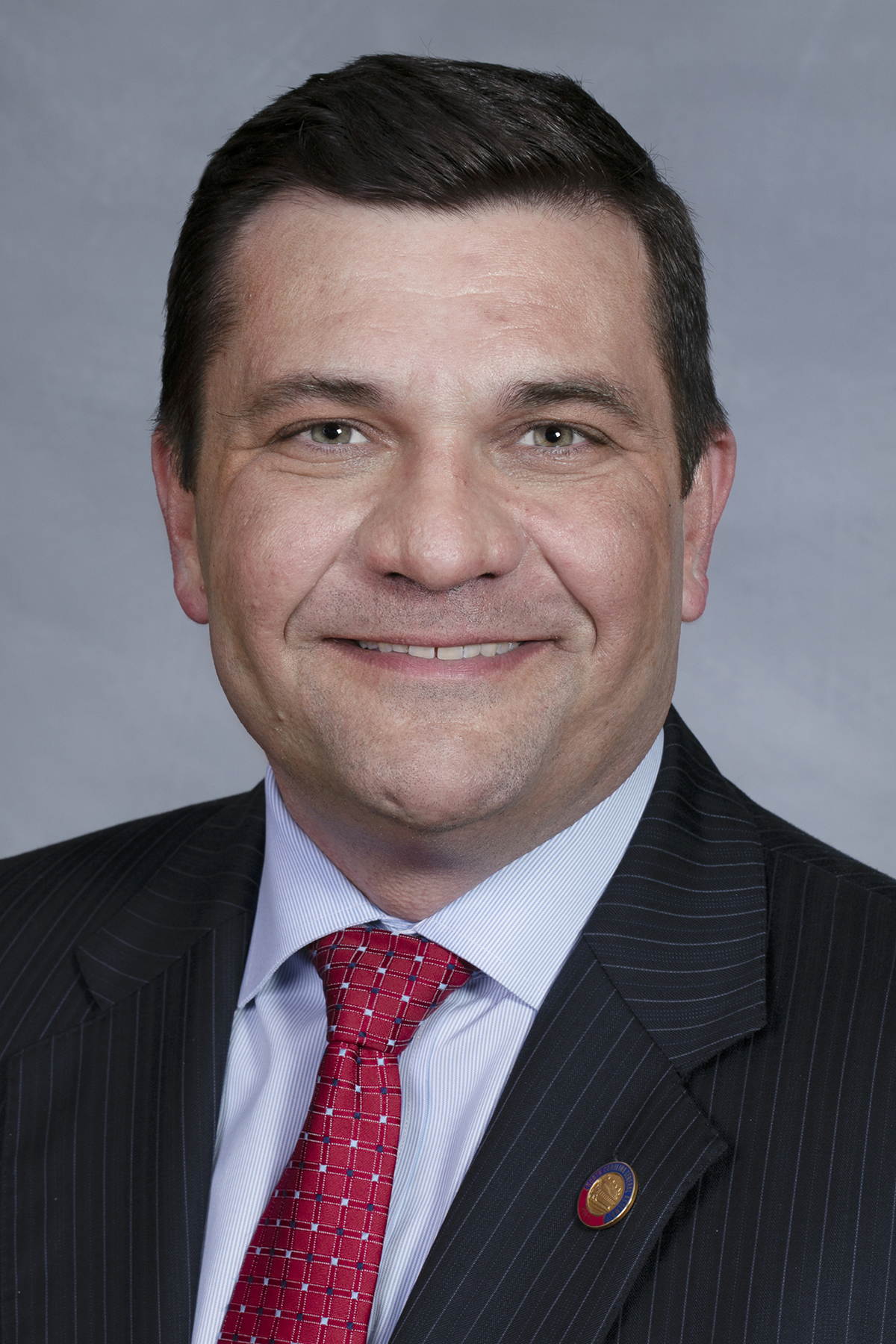

Member of the North Carolina House of Representatives from the 94th district
- In office January 1, 2013 – September 13, 2024
- Preceded by: Shirley Randleman
- Succeeded by: Blair Eddins

Personal details
- Born: Jeffrey Carter Elmore; January 17, 1978 (age 48) Wilkesboro, North Carolina, U.S.
- Party: Republican
- Spouse: Laura
- Children: Carter Elmore, Campbell Elmore
- Education: Appalachian State University (BS)

Jeffrey Elmore (born January 17, 1978) is an American politician and educator who is a former member of the North Carolina House of Representatives. He represented the 94th district (including constituents in Alexander and Wilkes counties) from 2013 to 2024. He ran in the 2024 North Carolina lieutenant gubernatorial election.

== Background ==
Representative Jeffrey Elmore, serves the 94th House District in the North Carolina House of Representatives. The 94th District is made up of the population centers of Wilkes County and Alexander County. He has held this position since his election in 2012. He is Chairman of Appropriations, as well as a member of several committees. Prior to his service in state government, he served as a Commissioner in the Town of North Wilkesboro and was elected in 2007. Prior to his service as Commissioner, he served as a planning board member and chairman of the Board of Adjustments. He served as president of Professional Educators of North Carolina (PENC), a nonpartisan group of 7,000 teachers in North Carolina and also as a board member of the Blue Ridge Opportunity Commission (BROC) which manages Head Start and aids unprivileged citizens. BROC serves Wilkes, Ashe, and Alleghany counties. Jeffrey grew up in Wilkes County and has deep family roots. Jeffrey was a North Carolina Teaching Fellow and graduated from Appalachian State University, Summa Cum Laude. Upon graduation he went into the classroom. Jeffrey is a teacher in Wilkes County Schools and is in his twentieth year. Elmore was elected to the North Carolina House of Representatives in 2012 and assumed office in 2013. He resigned in September 2024.

== Committee assignments ==
=== 2023–2024 session ===
- Appropriations (Chair)
- Appropriations - Education (Vice Chair)
- Agriculture
- Education - K-12
- Education - Community Colleges
- Election Law and Campaign Finance Reform
- Judiciary III
- Pensions and Retirement
- Rules, Calendar, and Operations of the House
- Transportation

=== 2021–2022 session ===
- Appropriations (Chair)
- Appropriations - Education (Vice Chair)
- Agriculture
- Education - K-12
- Education - Community Colleges
- Pensions and Retirement

=== 2019–2020 session ===
- Appropriations (Vice Chair)
- Appropriations - Education (Chair)
- Education - K-12 (Chair)
- Agriculture
- Education - Community Colleges
- Pensions and Retirement
- Redistricting

=== 2017–2018 session ===
- Appropriations (Vice Chair)
- Appropriations - Education (Chair)
- Education - K-12 (Chair)
- Education - Universities
- Pensions and Retirement
- Energy and Public Utilities
- State Personnel

=== 2015–2016 session ===
- Appropriations
- Appropriations - Education
- Education - K-12 (Chair)
- Education - Universities
- Pensions and Retirement
- Public Utilities
- State Personnel

=== 2013–2014 session ===
- Appropriations
- Education (Vice Chair)
- Public Utilities
- State Personnel
- Government

== Electoral history ==
=== 2024 ===
Lieutenant Governor of North Carolina Republican primary election, 2024
Party	Candidate	Votes	%
Republican	Hal Weatherman	181,818	19.59%
Republican	Jim O'Neill	147,042	15.84%
Republican	Deanna Ballard	138,822	14.96%
Republican	Seth Woodall	102,492	11.04%
Republican	Sam Page	94,810	10.22%
Republican	Allen Mashburn	83,550	9.00%
Republican	Jeffrey Elmore	79,883	8.61%
Republican	Peter Boykin	32,126	3.46%
Republican	Rivera Douthit	23,398	2.52%
Republican	Ernest T. Reeves	22,760	2.45%
Republican	Marlenis Hernandez Novoa	21,404	2.31%
Total votes		928,105	100%

=== 2022 ===
North Carolina House of Representatives 94th district general election, 2022
Party	Candidate	Votes	%
Republican	Jeffrey Elmore (incumbent)	27,924	80.07%
Democratic	Chuck Hubbard	6,952	19.93%
Total votes		34,876	100%
Republican hold			

=== 2020 ===
North Carolina House of Representatives 94th district general election, 2020
Party	Candidate	Votes	%
Republican	Jeffrey Elmore (incumbent)	36,696	100%
Total votes		36,696	100%
Republican hold			

=== 2018 ===
North Carolina House of Representatives 94th district general election, 2018
Party	Candidate	Votes	%
Republican	Jeffrey Elmore (incumbent)	21,278	72.68%
Democratic	Dianne Little	7,998	27.32%
Total votes		29,276	100%
Republican hold			

=== 2016 ===
North Carolina House of Representatives 94th district general election, 2016
Party	Candidate	Votes	%
Republican	Jeffrey Elmore (incumbent)	24,467	74.51%
Democratic	Michael T. Lentz	8,372	25.49%
Total votes		32,839	100%
Republican hold			

=== 2014 ===
North Carolina House of Representatives 94th district Republican primary election, 2014
Party	Candidate	Votes	%
Republican	Jeffrey Elmore (incumbent)	4,616	70.07%
Republican	Gary D. Blevins	1,972	29.93%
Total votes		6,588	100%

North Carolina House of Representatives 94th district general election, 2014
Party	Candidate	Votes	%
Republican	Jeffrey Elmore (incumbent)	16,357	100%
Total votes		16,357	100%
Republican hold			

=== 2012 ===
North Carolina House of Representatives 94th district Republican primary election, 2012
Party	Candidate	Votes	%
Republican	Jeffrey Elmore	6,937	61.89%
Republican	John Reavill	2,168	19.34%
Republican	John J. Goudreau	2,103	18.76%
Total votes		11,208	100%

North Carolina House of Representatives 94th district general election, 2012
Party	Candidate	Votes	%
Republican	Jeffrey Elmore	23,601	100%
Total votes		23,601	100%
Republican hold			

North Carolina House of Representatives
Preceded by Shirley Randleman	Member of the North Carolina House of Representatives from the 94th district 2013–2024	Succeeded by Blair Eddins
