= Dan Soucek =

American politician

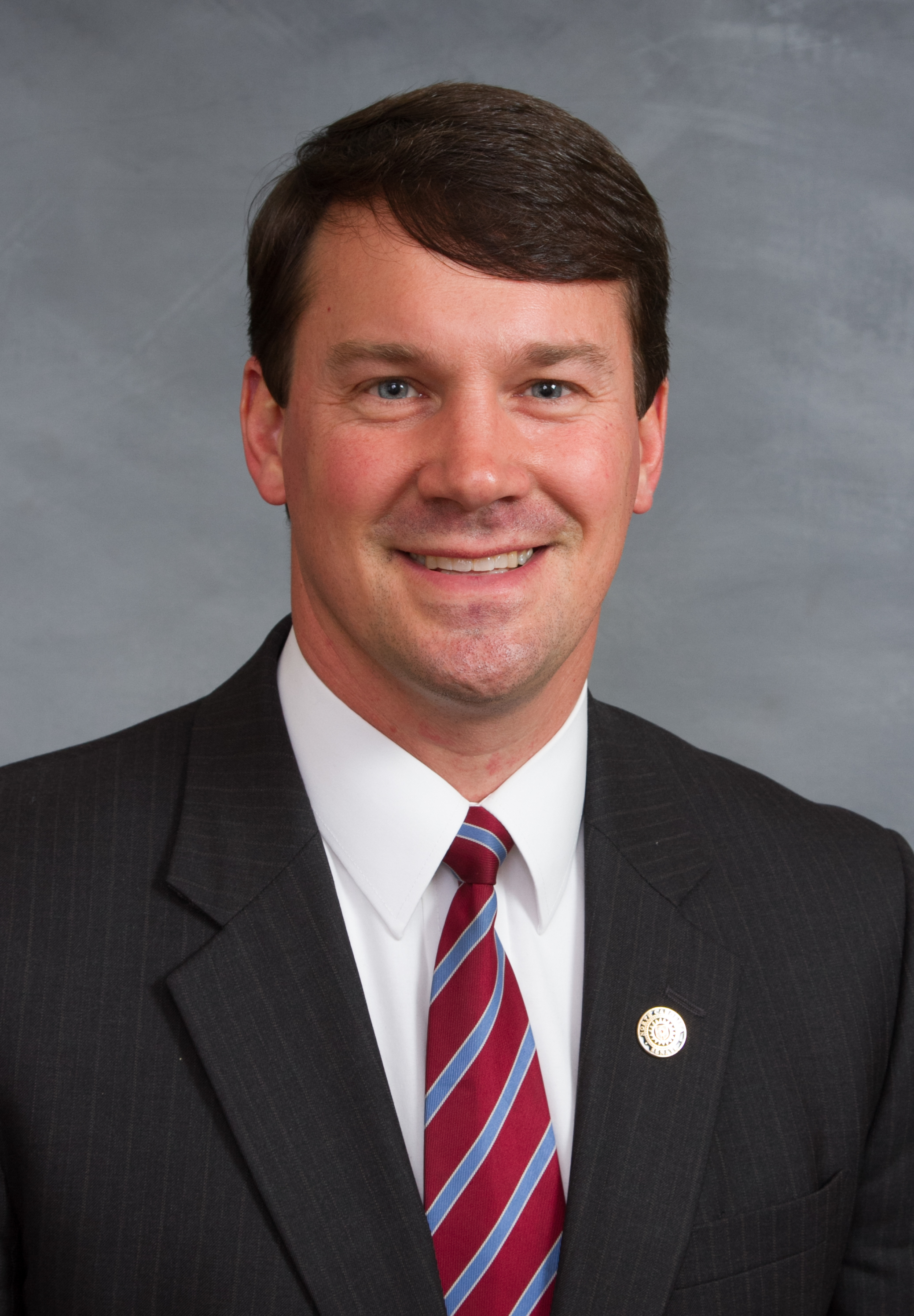
- Official portrait, 2013

Member of the North Carolina Senate from the 45th district
- In office January 1, 2011 – April 8, 2016
- Preceded by: Steve Goss
- Succeeded by: Deanna Ballard

Personal details
- Born: Daniel Frederick Soucek; April 22, 1969 (age 57) Westfield, New Jersey, U.S.
- Party: Republican

Daniel Frederick Chittenden Soucek (born April 22, 1969) is a Republican former member of the North Carolina Senate, who represented the State's 45th district. During his time in office, the 45th District included Alexander, Ashe, Watauga and Wilkes counties (2011 - 2012) and after redistricting, Alleghany, Ashe, Avery, Caldwell and Watauga counties. On April 8, 2016, Soucek announced his immediate resignation. In December 2015 he had said he would not seek re-election, citing the desire to spend more time with his family. He served three terms in the North Carolina Senate.

== Background ==
Dan Soucek was born in Westfield, New Jersey in 1969. He graduated from the United States Military Academy in 1991 and was commissioned a Second Lieutenant in Army Aviation. He was on active duty for over eight years and served in a variety of leadership positions including Company Commander of the International Student Office at Fort Rucker in Alabama.

After resigning his commission in 1999 he moved to Boone, North Carolina to assume the role of Young Life Area Director for Watauga, Ashe, and Avery Counties. In 2004, he began working as the Asia Regional Director for Operation Christmas Child at Samaritan's Purse. He was first elected to the North Carolina State Senate in 2010 and won re-election in 2012 and 2014. He was a primary sponsor of the North Carolina Marriage Amendment, which was adopted by referendum in May 2012 but ruled unconstitutional in October 2014.

His achievements include:

- Qualification in the Bell AH-1 Cobra helicopter
- Qualification in the Bell UH-1 Iroquois "Huey" helicopter
- Airborne and Air Assault qualified
- AH-1 Top Gun Award recipient
- Iron Aviator triathlon champion

His duties and assignments have allowed him to work with the United States Department of State, general officers and religious leaders from many countries, international business leaders, and governments at all levels from customs officials to Governors, a Prime Minister, and a King.

He has also served as a cross country and track coach at Watauga High School, coached youth soccer and served as an adult and high school Sunday school teacher at Alliance Bible Fellowship.

In February 2013, Dan joined the North Carolina National Guard as a citizen soldier, while continuing to serve in the NC Senate.

== Political positions ==
Conservatism

- Received 100% scores from the American Conservative Union in 2011 and 2013.
- Received a 98% score from Civitas Action in 2011 and a 94% score in 2013.

Pro-life

- Endorsed by the North Carolina Right to Life organization.

Pro Second Amendment

- Received a 4 star rating from Grassroots North Carolina, an organization created to preserve second amendment rights.
- The NRA Political Victory Fund gave Soucek consistent "A" grades.

Pro Business

- Endorsed by the National Federation of Independent Business.

Environmental Issues

- Received a 3% lifetime rating from the North Carolina League of Conservation Voters in 2013.
- Received a rating of 0% from Environment North Carolina in 2011 and 2013 and a 5% rating in 2015.

Endorsements

- Grass Roots North Carolina
- National Federation of Independent Business
- National Rifle Association
- State Employees' Association of North Carolina

== Committee assignments ==
2015-2016 Session

Committee	Status
Appropriations on Education/Higher Education	Co-chairman
Appropriations/Base Budget	Member
Commerce	Member
Education/Higher Education	Co-chairman
Finance	Member
Judiciary I	Member
Redistricting	Member
Select Committee on UNC Board of Governors	Member
Workforce and Economic Development	Member

North Carolina Senate
Preceded by Steve Goss	Member of the North Carolina Senate from the 45th district 2011–2016	Succeeded by Deanna Ballard
