= Steve Jarvis =

American politician from North Carolina

Senator Steve Jarvis
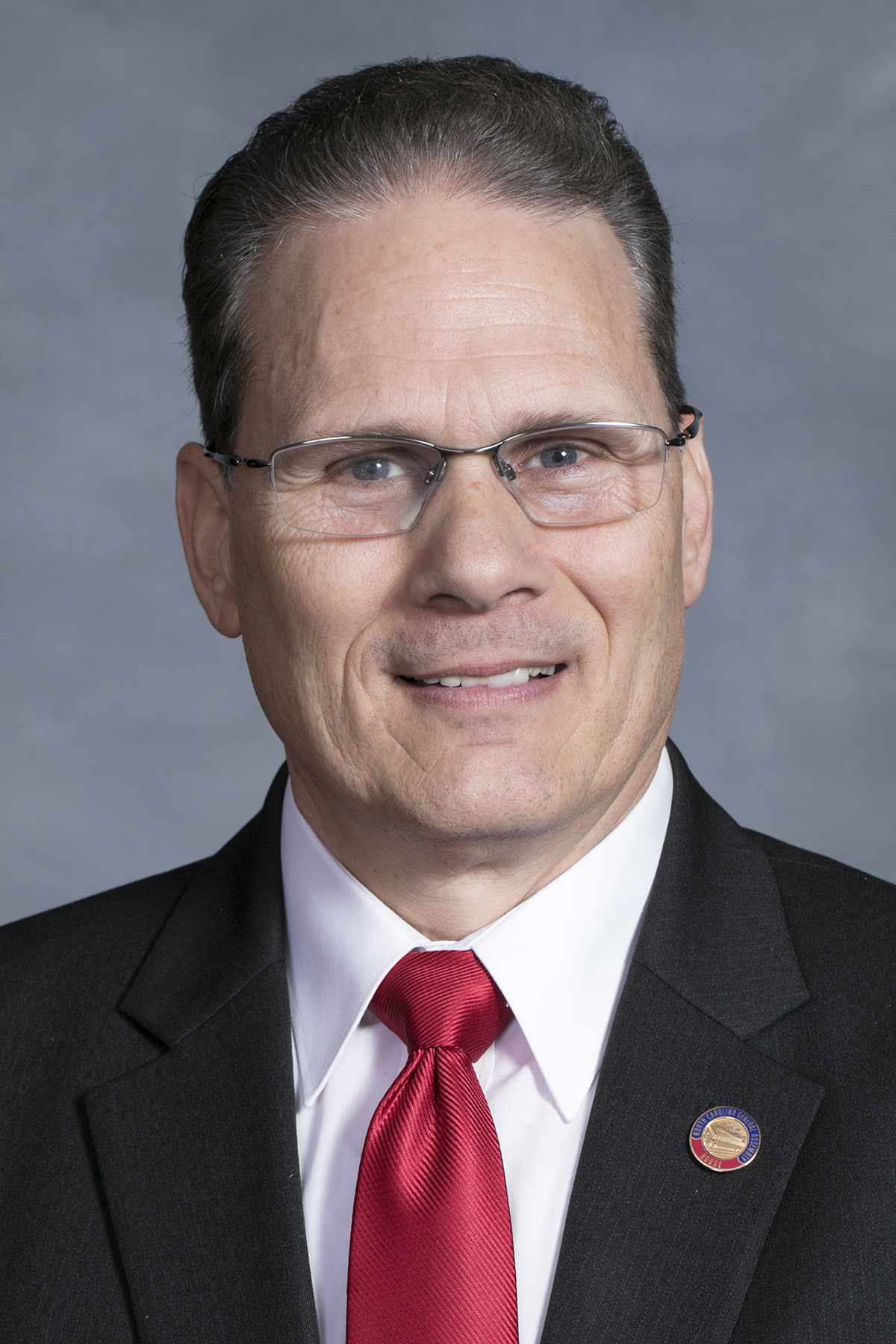

Member of the North Carolina Senate
- Incumbent
- Assumed office January 1, 2021
- Preceded by: Eddie Gallimore
- Constituency: 29th district (2021–2023); 30th district (2023–Present)

Member of the North Carolina House of Representatives from the 80th district
- In office January 1, 2019 – January 1, 2021
- Preceded by: Sam Watford
- Succeeded by: Sam Watford

Member of the Davidson County Board of Commissioners
- In office December 3, 2012 – January 3, 2019
- Preceded by: Cathy Dunn
- Succeeded by: Todd Yates

Personal details
- Born: April 22, 1968 (age 58) Anderson, Indiana, U.S.
- Party: Republican
- Education: UNC School of Government
- Occupation: General contractor

Steven Henry Jarvis (born April 22, 1968) is an American politician who is a Republican member of the North Carolina Senate, having been initially elected in 2020. He represents the 29th district. He previously served as county commissioner of Davidson County and as a member of the North Carolina House of Representatives, serving the 80th district from 2019 until 2021.

== Committee assignments ==
=== 2025–2026 Session ===
- Appropriations
- Appropriations - General Government and Information Technology
- Appropriations - Base Budget
- Commerce and Insurance
- State and Local Government
- Agriculture, Energy, and Environment
- Transportation

=== 2023–2024 Session ===
- Appropriations
- Appropriations - General Government and Information Technology (Chair)
- Commerce and Insurance
- Health Care
- State and Local Government (Chair)
- Agriculture, Energy, and Environment
- Transportation

=== 2021–2022 Session ===
- Appropriations
- Appropriations - Health and Human Services
- Health Care
- State and Local Government
- Agriculture, Energy, and Environment

=== 2019–2020 Session ===
- Appropriations
- Appropriations - Health and Human Services
- Banking
- Commerce
- Health
- State and Local Government

== Electoral history ==
=== 2026 ===
North Carolina Senate 30th district Republican primary election, 2026
Party	Candidate	Votes	%
Republican	Steve Jarvis (incumbent)	15,407	75.54%
Republican	Eddie Gallimore	4,989	24.46%
Total votes		20,396	100%

=== 2024 ===
North Carolina Senate 30th district general election, 2024
Party	Candidate	Votes	%
Republican	Steve Jarvis (incumbent)	86,181	72.64%
Democratic	Tina Royal	29,294	24.69%
Libertarian	Daniel Cavender	3,161	2.66%
Total votes		118,636	100%
Republican hold			

=== 2022 ===
Republican primary for the 2022 North Carolina Senate 30th district election
Party	Candidate	Votes	%
Republican	Steve Jarvis (incumbent)	15,986	65.69%
Republican	Eddie Gallimore	8,348	34.31%
Total votes		24,334	100%

2022 North Carolina Senate 30th district general election
Party	Candidate	Votes	%
Republican	Steve Jarvis (incumbent)	59,091	76.60%
Democratic	Monique D. Johnson	18,051	23.40%
Total votes		77,142	100%
Republican hold			

=== 2020 ===
Republican primary for the 2020 North Carolina Senate 29th district election
Party	Candidate	Votes	%
Republican	Steve Jarvis	11,617	53.30%
Republican	Eddie Gallimore (incumbent)	10,179	46.70%
Total votes		21,796	100%

2020 North Carolina Senate 29th district general election
Party	Candidate	Votes	%
Republican	Steve Jarvis	74,210	74.49%
Democratic	Duskin Lassiter	25,409	25.51%
Total votes		99,619	100%
Republican hold			

=== 2018 ===
Republican primary for the 2018 North Carolina House of Representatives 80th district election
Party	Candidate	Votes	%
Republican	Steve Jarvis	6,371	67.28%
Republican	Roger Younts	3,098	32.72%
Total votes		9,469	100%

2018 North Carolina House of Representatives 80th district general election
Party	Candidate	Votes	%
Republican	Steve Jarvis	21,283	75.08%
Democratic	Wendy B. Sellars	7,063	24.92%
Total votes		28,346	100%
Republican hold			

=== 2016 ===
Davidson County Board of Commissioners Republican primary election, 2016
Party	Candidate	Votes	%
Republican	Steve Jarvis (incumbent)	13,625	24.23%
Republican	Fred D. McClure (incumbent)	11,851	21.08%
Republican	Zak Crotts	9,668	17.20%
Republican	Karen Hege Watford	9,530	16.95%
Republican	David Speight	6,396	11.38%
Republican	Jacob "Jake" Beck	5,154	9.17%
Total votes		56,224	100%

Davidson County Board of Commissioners general election, 2016
Party	Candidate	Votes	%
Republican	Zak Crotts	50,989	34.82%
Republican	Steve Jarvis (incumbent)	48,359	33.02%
Republican	Fred D. McClure (incumbent)	47,086	32.16%
Total votes		146,434	100%
Republican hold			
Republican hold			
Republican hold			

=== 2012 ===
Davidson County Board of Commissioners Republican primary election, 2012
Party	Candidate	Votes	%
Republican	Steve Jarvis	10,392	19.41%
Republican	Larry Potts (incumbent)	9,953	18.59%
Republican	Fred D. McClure (incumbent)	9,648	18.02%
Republican	Steven Franklin Shell	7,833	14.63%
Republican	Larry Allen	6,290	11.75%
Republican	Leona Sink	5,841	10.91%
Republican	Don Dublin	3,574	6.68%
Total votes		53,531	100%

Davidson County Board of Commissioners general election, 2012
Party	Candidate	Votes	%
Republican	Steve Jarvis	47,440	26.89%
Republican	Fred D. McClure (incumbent)	45,515	25.80%
Republican	Larry Potts (incumbent)	45,178	25.61%
Democratic	Phil Olshinski	21,815	12.36%
Libertarian	David Speight	9,169	5.20%
Libertarian	Lon Cecil	7,320	4.15%
Total votes		176,437	100%
Republican hold			
Republican hold			
Republican hold			

North Carolina House of Representatives
Preceded by Sam Watford	Member of the North Carolina House of Representatives from the 80th district 2019–2021	Succeeded by Sam Watford
North Carolina Senate
Preceded by Eddie Gallimore	Member of the North Carolina Senate from the 29th district 2021–2023	Succeeded by Dave Craven
Preceded by Phil Berger	Member of the North Carolina Senate from the 30th district 2023–Present	Incumbent
