= John A. Garwood =

American politician

John Allen Garwood (July 8, 1932 – November 30, 2010) was a Republican member of the North Carolina General Assembly, who represented the state's thirtieth Senate district, including constituents in Stokes, Surry and Wilkes counties, for five terms (1997–2006). A retiree from North Wilkesboro, North Carolina, Garwood also served as a county commissioner and as a member of the state House of Representatives before being elected to the Senate.

Garwood was defeated by David Blust in the May 4, 2006, Republican primary. He died November 30, 2010, at the age of 78.

North Carolina Senate
Preceded by Daniel Reid Simpson; Donald Rayvaugh Kincaid	Member of the North Carolina Senate from the 27th district 1997–2003; Served alongside: Kenneth Ray Moore	Succeeded by Kay Hagan
Preceded by David Weinstein	Member of the North Carolina Senate from the 30th district 2003–2005	Succeeded by Don East
Preceded by Virginia Foxx	Member of the North Carolina Senate from the 45th district 2005–2007	Succeeded by Steve Goss
