= Steve Goss =

American politician (1949–2015)

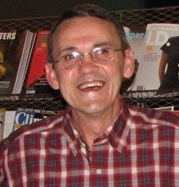
- Goss in 2006

Member of the North Carolina Senate from the 45th district
- In office January 1, 2007 – January 1, 2011
- Preceded by: John Garwood
- Succeeded by: Dan Soucek

Personal details
- Born: Benjamin Stephenson Goss; November 7, 1949 Jefferson, North Carolina, U.S.
- Died: October 26, 2015 (aged 65) Boone, North Carolina, U.S.
- Party: Democratic
- Education: Appalachian State University (BS); Southeastern Baptist Theological Seminary (M.Div.)
- Occupation: Minister

Benjamin Stephenson Goss (November 7, 1949 – October 26, 2015) was an American politician. He served two terms (January 2007 – December 2010) as a Democratic member of the North Carolina Senate. He represented the 45th Senate district, including constituents in Alexander, Ashe, Watauga, and Wilkes counties. He was defeated for re-election in 2010 by Republican Dan Soucek.

Goss was an ordained Southern Baptist minister and resided in Boone, North Carolina. He has a BS in social science with a minor in education from Appalachian State University and a Master of Divinity (MDiv) from Southeastern Baptist Theological Seminary. He died at his home in Boone from cancer on October 26, 2015, at the age of 65.

North Carolina Senate
Preceded by John Garwood	Member of the North Carolina Senate from the 45th district 2007–2011	Succeeded by Dan Soucek
