= North Carolina's 30th Senate district =

American legislative district

North Carolina's 30th State Senate district
Senator
Steve Jarvis; R–Lexington
- Demographics: 78% White; 8% Black; 8% Hispanic; 1% Asian; 4% Multiracial
- Population (2023): 214,589

North Carolina's 30th Senate district is one of 50 districts in the North Carolina Senate. It has been represented by Republican Steve Jarvis since 2023.

== Geography ==
Since 2023, the district has included all of Davidson and Davie counties. The district overlaps with the 77th, 80th, and 81st state house districts.

== District officeholders ==
Senator	Party	Dates	Notes	Counties
District created January 1, 1983.				1983–1993; All of Robeson and Hoke Counties.
David Parnell (Parkton)	Democratic	January 1, 1983 – January 1, 1997	Retired.	1983–1993; All of Robeson and Hoke Counties.
David Parnell (Parkton)	Democratic	January 1, 1983 – January 1, 1997	Retired.	1993–2003; All of Robeson County. Parts of Hoke, Cumberland, Bladen, and Sampson counties.
David Weinstein (Lumberton)	Democratic	January 1, 1997 – January 1, 2003	Redistricted to the 13th district.	1993–2003; All of Robeson County. Parts of Hoke, Cumberland, Bladen, and Sampson counties.
John Garwood (North Wilkesboro)	Republican	January 1, 2003 – January 1, 2005	Redistricted from the 27th district. Redistricted to the 45th district.	2003–2005; All of Stokes and Surry counties. Part of Wilkes County.
Don East (Pilot Mountain)	Republican	January 1, 2005 – October 22, 2012	Died.	2005–2013; All of Stokes, Surry, Yadkin, and Alleghany counties.
Vacant		October 22, 2012 – January 1, 2013		2005–2013; All of Stokes, Surry, Yadkin, and Alleghany counties.
Shirley Randleman (Wilkesboro)	Republican	January 1, 2013 – January 1, 2019	Redistricted to the 45th district and lost re-nomination.	2013–2019; All of Stokes, Surry, and Wilkes counties.
Phil Berger (Eden)	Republican	January 1, 2019 – January 1, 2023	Redistricted from the 26th district. Redistricted to the 26th district.	2019–2023; All of Caswell, Rockingham, and Stokes counties. Part of Surry County.
Steve Jarvis (Lexington)	Republican	January 1, 2023 – Present	Redistricted from the 29th district.	2023–Present; All of Davidson and Davie counties.

== Election results ==
=== 2024 ===
North Carolina Senate 30th district general election, 2024
Party	Candidate	Votes	%
Republican	Steve Jarvis (incumbent)	86,181	72.64%
Democratic	Tina Royal	29,294	24.69%
Libertarian	Daniel Cavender	3,161	2.66%
Total votes		118,636	100%
Republican hold			

=== 2022 ===
North Carolina Senate 30th district Republican primary election, 2022
Party	Candidate	Votes	%
Republican	Steve Jarvis (incumbent)	15,986	65.69%
Republican	Eddie Gallimore	8,348	34.31%
Total votes		24,334	100%

North Carolina Senate 30th district general election, 2022
Party	Candidate	Votes	%
Republican	Steve Jarvis (incumbent)	59,091	76.60%
Democratic	Monique D. Johnson	18,051	23.40%
Total votes		77,142	100%
Republican hold			

=== 2020 ===
North Carolina Senate 30th district general election, 2020
Party	Candidate	Votes	%
Republican	Phil Berger (incumbent)	68,708	68.58%
Democratic	Wally White	31,481	31.42%
Total votes		100,189	100%
Republican hold			

=== 2018 ===
North Carolina Senate 30th district general election, 2018
Party	Candidate	Votes	%
Republican	Phil Berger (incumbent)	43,132	62.63%
Democratic	Jen Mangrum	23,558	34.21%
Libertarian	R. Michael Jordan	2,182	3.17%
Total votes		68,872	100%
Republican hold			

=== 2016 ===
North Carolina Senate 30th district general election, 2016
Party	Candidate	Votes	%
Republican	Shirley Randleman (incumbent)	59,602	72.65%
Democratic	Michael W. Holleman	22,435	27.35%
Total votes		82,037	100%
Republican hold			

=== 2014 ===
North Carolina Senate 30th district general election, 2014
Party	Candidate	Votes	%
Republican	Shirley Randleman (incumbent)	35,783	71.06%
Democratic	Eva P. Ingle	14,572	28.94%
Total votes		50,355	100%
Republican hold			

=== 2012 ===
North Carolina Senate 30th district general election, 2012
Party	Candidate	Votes	%
Republican	Shirley Randleman (Note: Replaced Don East on the ballot.)	49,417	64.32%
Democratic	Ric Marshall	27,416	35.68%
Total votes		76,833	100%
Republican hold			

=== 2010 ===
North Carolina Senate 30th district Democratic election, 2010
Party	Candidate	Votes	%
Democratic	Ric Marshall	3,532	75.50%
Democratic	Robert Nickell	1,146	24.50%
Total votes		4,678	100%

North Carolina Senate 30th district Republican primary election, 2010
Party	Candidate	Votes	%
Republican	Don East (incumbent)	7,832	73.29%
Republican	Paul M. Johnson	2,855	26.71%
Total votes		10,687	100%

North Carolina Senate 30th district general election, 2010
Party	Candidate	Votes	%
Republican	Don East (incumbent)	32,422	67.83%
Democratic	Ric Marshall	15,376	32.17%
Total votes		47,798	100%
Republican hold			

=== 2008 ===
North Carolina Senate 30th district general election, 2008
Party	Candidate	Votes	%
Republican	Don East (incumbent)	52,754	100%
Total votes		52,754	100%
Republican hold			

=== 2006 ===
North Carolina Senate 30th district general election, 2006
Party	Candidate	Votes	%
Republican	Don East (incumbent)	25,698	100%
Total votes		25,698	100%
Republican hold			

=== 2004 ===
North Carolina Senate 30th district general election, 2004
Party	Candidate	Votes	%
Republican	Don East	40,611	64.67%
Democratic	Melvin T. Jackson	22,188	35.33%
Total votes		62,799	100%
Republican win (new seat)			

=== 2002 ===
North Carolina Senate 30th district Democratic election, 2002
Party	Candidate	Votes	%
Democratic	Ed Gambill	4,648	54.09%
Democratic	Lana Wood Brendle	3,945	45.91%
Total votes		8,593	100%

North Carolina Senate 30th district Republican primary election, 2002
Party	Candidate	Votes	%
Republican	John Garwood (incumbent)	6,205	54.88%
Republican	Don East	5,101	45.12%
Total votes		11,306	100%

North Carolina Senate 30th district general election, 2002
Party	Candidate	Votes	%
Republican	John Garwood (incumbent)	28,591	61.16%
Democratic	Ed Gambill	16,842	36.03%
Libertarian	James Wentz	1,315	2.81%
Total votes		46,748	100%
Republican hold			

=== 2000 ===
North Carolina Senate 30th district general election, 2000
Party	Candidate	Votes	%
Democratic	David Weinstein (incumbent)	31,062	79.12%
Republican	John Rim	8,196	20.88%
Total votes		39,258	100%
Democratic hold			
