= Deanna Ballard =

American politician

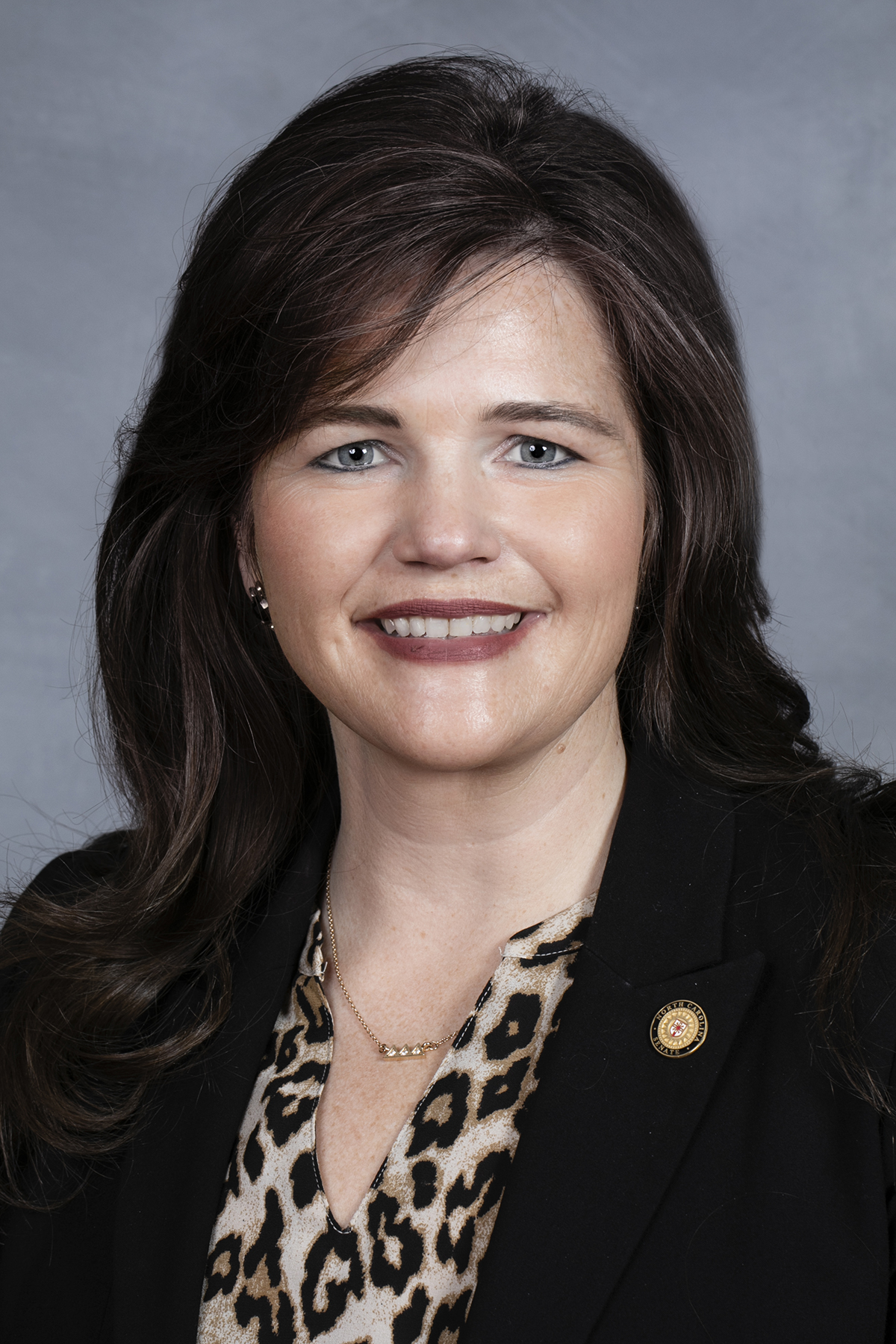
- Official portrait, 2019

Member of the North Carolina Senate from the 45th district
- In office April 27, 2016 – January 1, 2023
- Preceded by: Dan Soucek
- Succeeded by: Ralph Hise (Redistricting)

Personal details
- Born: October 2, 1978 (age 47) Blowing Rock, North Carolina, U.S.
- Party: Republican
- Education: Belmont University (BBA)

Deanna Ballard (born October 2, 1978) is an American politician who served in the North Carolina Senate from the 45th district from 2016 to 2023. She ran for Lieutenant Governor in 2024.

== Electoral history ==
=== 2022 ===
North Carolina Senate 47th district Republican primary election, 2022
Party	Candidate	Votes	%
Republican	Ralph Hise (incumbent)	13,163	50.70%
Republican	Deanna Ballard (incumbent)	12,801	49.30%
Total votes		25,964	100%

=== 2020 ===
North Carolina Senate 45th district general election, 2020
Party	Candidate	Votes	%
Republican	Deanna Ballard (incumbent)	71,897	68.45%
Democratic	Jeanne Supin	33,139	31.55%
Total votes		105,036	100%
Republican hold			

=== 2018 ===
North Carolina Senate 45th district Republican primary election, 2018
Party	Candidate	Votes	%
Republican	Deanna Ballard (incumbent)	8,403	53.59%
Republican	Shirley Randleman (incumbent)	7,276	46.41%
Total votes		15,679	100%

North Carolina Senate 45th district general election, 2018
Party	Candidate	Votes	%
Republican	Deanna Ballard (incumbent)	48,998	65.08%
Democratic	Wes Luther	26,293	34.92%
Total votes		75,291	100%
Republican hold			

=== 2016 ===
North Carolina Senate 45th district Republican primary election, 2016
Party	Candidate	Votes	%
Republican	Deanna Ballard	13,546	53.00%
Republican	Ken Boham	12,013	47.00%
Total votes		25,559	100%

North Carolina Senate 45th district general election, 2016
Party	Candidate	Votes	%
Republican	Deanna Ballard (incumbent)	56,758	65.00%
Democratic	Art Sherwood	30,559	35.00%
Total votes		87,317	100%
Republican hold			

North Carolina Senate
Preceded by Dan Soucek	Member of the North Carolina Senate from the 45th district 2016–2023	Succeeded by Dean Proctor
