= Shirley B. Randleman =

American politician

Member of the North Carolina Senate from the 30th district
- In office January 1, 2013 – January 1, 2019
- Preceded by: Don W. East
- Succeeded by: Deanna Ballard (redistricting)

Member of the North Carolina House of Representatives from the 94th district
- In office January 1, 2009 – January 1, 2013
- Preceded by: Tracy Walker
- Succeeded by: Jeffrey Elmore

Personal details
- Born: October 14, 1950 (age 75) North Wilkesboro, North Carolina
- Party: Republican

Shirley Blackburn Randleman (born October 14, 1950) is an American politician who served in the North Carolina Senate from the 30th district from 2013 to 2019. She previously served in the North Carolina House of Representatives from the 94th district from 2009 to 2013.

== Electoral history ==
=== 2022 ===
Republican primary for the 2022 North Carolina Senate 36th district election
Party	Candidate	Votes	%
Republican	Eddie Settle	10,756	37.23%
Republican	Shirley B. Randleman	9,228	31.94%
Republican	Lee Zachary	5,053	17.49%
Republican	Vann Tate	3,852	13.33%
Total votes		28,889	100%

=== 2018 ===
Republican primary for the 2018 North Carolina Senate 45th district election
Party	Candidate	Votes	%
Republican	Deanna Ballard (incumbent)	8,403	53.59%
Republican	Shirley B. Randleman (incumbent)	7,276	46.41%
Total votes		15,679	100%

=== 2016 ===
2016 North Carolina Senate 30th district general election
Party	Candidate	Votes	%
Republican	Shirley B. Randleman (incumbent)	59,602	72.65%
Democratic	Michael W. Holleman	22,435	27.35%
Total votes		82,037	100%
Republican hold			

=== 2014 ===
2014 North Carolina Senate 30th district general election
Party	Candidate	Votes	%
Republican	Shirley B. Randleman (incumbent)	35,783	71.06%
Democratic	Eva P. Ingle	14,572	28.94%
Total votes		50,355	100%
Republican hold			

=== 2012 ===
2012 North Carolina Senate 30th district general election
Party	Candidate	Votes	%
Republican	Shirley B. Randleman	49,417	64.32%
Democratic	Ric Marshall	27,416	35.68%
Total votes		76,833	100%
Republican hold			

=== 2010 ===
Republican primary for the 2010 North Carolina House of Representatives 94th district election
Party	Candidate	Votes	%
Republican	Shirley B. Randleman (incumbent)	4,892	77.68%
Republican	John Reavill	1,406	22.32%
Total votes		6,298	100%

2010 North Carolina House of Representatives 94th district general election
Party	Candidate	Votes	%
Republican	Shirley B. Randleman (incumbent)	14,322	73.65%
Democratic	David H. Moulton	5,124	26.35%
Total votes		19,446	100%
Republican hold			

=== 2008 ===
Republican primary for the 2008 North Carolina House of Representatives 94th district election
Party	Candidate	Votes	%
Republican	Shirley B. Randleman	3,828	51.23%
Republican	Roger Dale Smithey	2,531	33.87%
Republican	John Reavill	1,113	14.90%
Total votes		7,472	100%

2008 North Carolina House of Representatives 94th district general election
Party	Candidate	Votes	%
Republican	Shirley B. Randleman	17,578	60.38%
Democratic	Larry Pendry	11,533	39.62%
Total votes		29,111	100%
Republican hold			

North Carolina House of Representatives
Preceded by Tracy Walker	Member of the North Carolina House of Representatives from the 94th district 2009-2013	Succeeded by Jeffrey Elmore
North Carolina Senate
Preceded by Don W. East	Member of the North Carolina Senate from the 30th district 2013-2019	Succeeded by Phil Berger
