= Sam Watford =

American politician from North Carolina

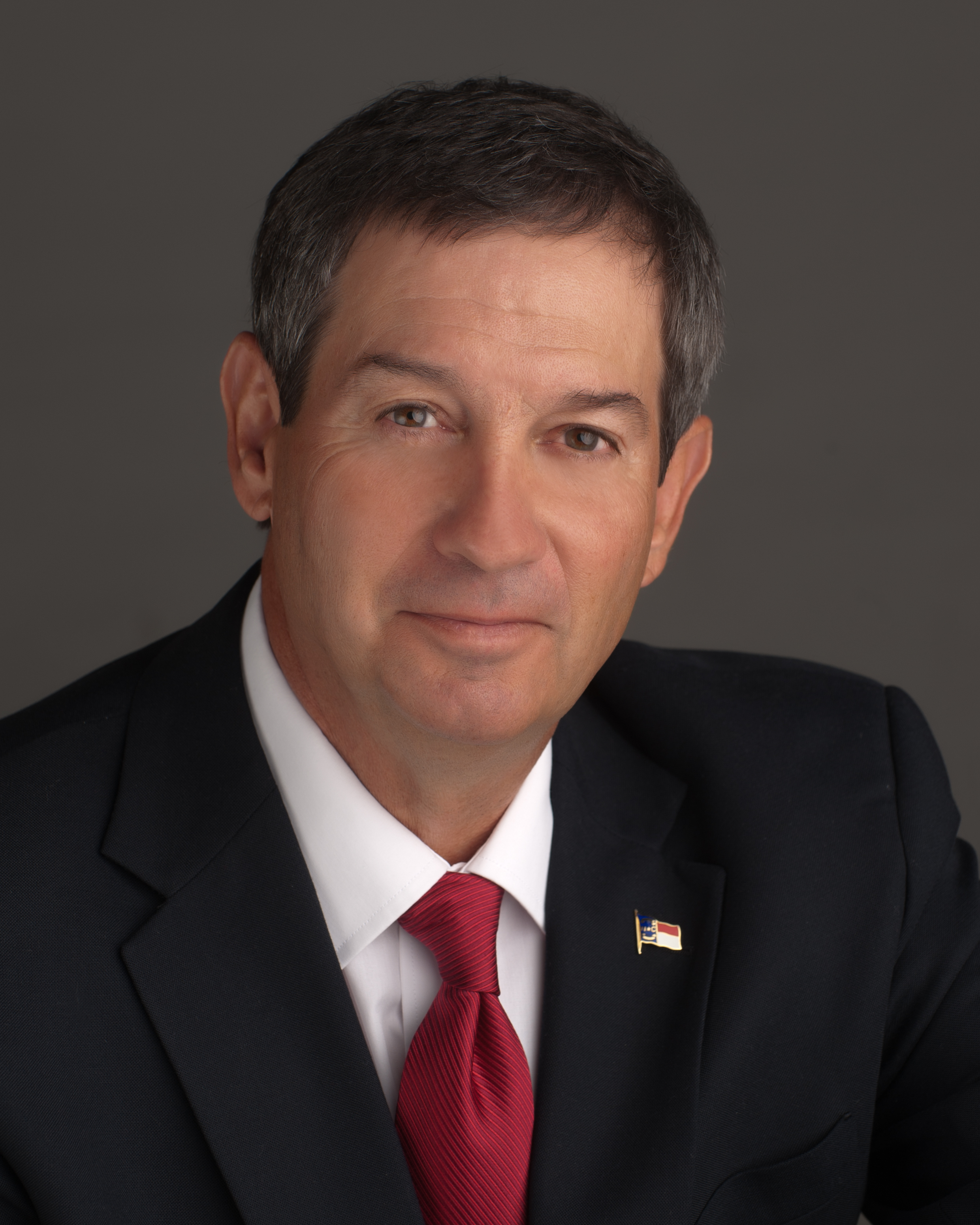

Member of the North Carolina House of Representatives from the 80th district
- Incumbent
- Assumed office January 1, 2021
- Preceded by: Steve Jarvis
- In office January 1, 2015 – January 1, 2019
- Preceded by: Roger Younts
- Succeeded by: Steve Jarvis

Personal details
- Born: Samuel Lee Watford; 1954 or 1955 (age 71–72)
- Party: Republican
- Spouse: Karen Hege Watford
- Education: Western Carolina University, Guilford Technical Institute
- Occupation: Contractor
- Website: Official Website

Sam Watford was a Republican member of the North Carolina General Assembly representing the state's 80th House district, including part in Davidson county (Thomasville). He served three terms as Davidson County Commissioner and has served on Davidson County Planning and Zoning Board. Watford is married to Karen Hege Watford, a retired teacher, and has two daughters, Morgan and Jordan. Watford supported, and voted for, the HB 465 - Amending Regulations Regarding Abortion, in 2015.

== Committee assignments ==
=== 2025–2026 Session ===
- State and Local Government (Chair)
- Energy and Public Utilities
- Agriculture and Environment
- Finance
- Housing and Development
- Select Committee on Property Tax Reduction and Reform

=== 2023–2024 Session ===
- Local Government (Chair)
- Local Government - Land Use, Planning and Development
- Energy and Public Utilities
- Agriculture
- Finance
- Health

=== 2021–2022 Session ===
- Local Government (Co-Chair)
- State Government Committee (Vice Chair)
- Energy and Public Utilities (Vice Chair)
- Agriculture
- Finance
- Health
- Transportation

=== 2017–2018 Session ===
- Appropriations
- Appropriations - Transportation
- Energy and Public Utilities (Chair)
- Regulatory Reform (Vice chair)
- Education - Community Colleges
- State and Local Government II
- Elections and Ethics Law
- Homelessness, Foster Care, and Dependency
- University Board of Governors Nominating

=== 2015–2016 Session ===
- Appropriations
- Appropriations - General Government
- Public Utilities (Vice Chair)
- Agriculture
- Children, Youth and Families
- Education - Community Colleges
- Local Government

== Electoral history ==
=== 2026 ===
North Carolina House of Representatives 80th district Republican primary election, 2026
Party	Candidate	Votes	%
Republican	Sam Watford (incumbent)	5,415	74.38%
Republican	Joseph Byrne	1,865	25.62%
Total votes		7,280	100%

=== 2024 ===
North Carolina House of Representatives 80th district Republican primary election, 2024
Party	Candidate	Votes	%
Republican	Sam Watford (incumbent)	5,931	50.32%
Republican	Eddie Gallimore	5,855	49.68%
Total votes		11,786	100%

North Carolina House of Representatives 80th district general election, 2024
Party	Candidate	Votes	%
Republican	Sam Watford (incumbent)	33,897	75.70%
Democratic	Kimberly Titlebaum	10,884	24.30%
Total votes		44,781	100%
Republican hold			

=== 2022 ===
North Carolina House of Representatives 80th district general election, 2022
Party	Candidate	Votes	%
Republican	Sam Watford (incumbent)	23,182	78.46%
Democratic	Dennis S. Miller	6,365	21.54%
Total votes		29,547	100%
Republican hold			

=== 2020 ===
North Carolina House of Representatives 80th district Republican primary election, 2020
Party	Candidate	Votes	%
Republican	Sam Watford	4,170	43.65%
Republican	Roger Younts	3,214	33.64%
Republican	Haley Sink	2,170	22.71%
Total votes		9,554	100%

North Carolina House of Representatives 80th district general election, 2020
Party	Candidate	Votes	%
Republican	Sam Watford	32,611	75.21%
Democratic	Wendy Sellars	10,748	24.79%
Total votes		43,359	100%
Republican hold			

=== 2018 ===
North Carolina Senate 29th district Republican primary election, 2018
Party	Candidate	Votes	%
Republican	Eddie Gallimore	11,775	55.48%
Republican	Sam Watford	9,448	44.52%
Total votes		21,223	100%

=== 2016 ===
North Carolina House of Representatives 80th district general election, 2016
Party	Candidate	Votes	%
Republican	Sam Watford (incumbent)	31,287	100%
Total votes		31,287	100%
Republican hold			

=== 2014 ===
North Carolina House of Representatives 80th district Republican primary election, 2014
Party	Candidate	Votes	%
Republican	Sam Watford	3,203	54.45%
Republican	Roger Younts (incumbent)	2,679	45.55%
Total votes		5,882	100%

North Carolina House of Representatives 80th district general election, 2014
Party	Candidate	Votes	%
Republican	Sam Watford	16,459	100%
Total votes		16,459	100%
Republican hold			

=== 2012 ===
North Carolina Senate 33rd district Republican primary election, 2012
Party	Candidate	Votes	%
Republican	Stan Bingham (incumbent)	9,135	40.44%
Republican	Eddie Gallimore	8,630	38.21%
Republican	Sam Watford	4,823	21.35%
Total votes		22,588	100%

=== 2010 ===
Davidson County Board of Commissioners Republican primary election, 2010
Party	Candidate	Votes	%
Republican	Billy Joe Kepley	8,217	15.80%
Republican	Don W. Truell	6,941	13.35%
Republican	Sam Watford	6,811	13.10%
Republican	Todd Yates	5,359	10.31%
Republican	Larry Allen	5,253	10.10%
Republican	Eddie Gallimore	4,525	8.70%
Republican	Dwight D. Cornelison	3,995	7.68%
Republican	Kenneth "Stump" Cavender	3,273	6.29%
Republican	Owen Moore	3,267	6.28%
Republican	Joseph Lee Byerly	2,276	4.38%
Republican	Eric Osborne	2,077	3.99%
Total votes		51,994	100%

Davidson County Board of Commissioners general election, 2010
Party	Candidate	Votes	%
Republican	Billy Joe Kepley	28,111	18.01%
Republican	Todd Yates	27,950	17.91%
Republican	Sam Watford	27,445	17.59%
Republican	Don W. Truell	27,407	17.56%
Democratic	Jason Hedrick	14,835	9.51%
Democratic	Ronald Swicegood	10,578	6.78%
Democratic	Jeff Switzer	10,163	6.51%
Democratic	Kevin Williams	9,571	6.13%
Total votes		156,060	100%

North Carolina House of Representatives
Preceded by Roger Younts	Member of the North Carolina House of Representatives from the 80th district 2015–2019	Succeeded by Steve Jarvis
Preceded by Steve Jarvis	Member of the North Carolina House of Representatives from the 80th district 2021–Present	Incumbent
