= Eddie Gallimore =

American politician from North Carolina

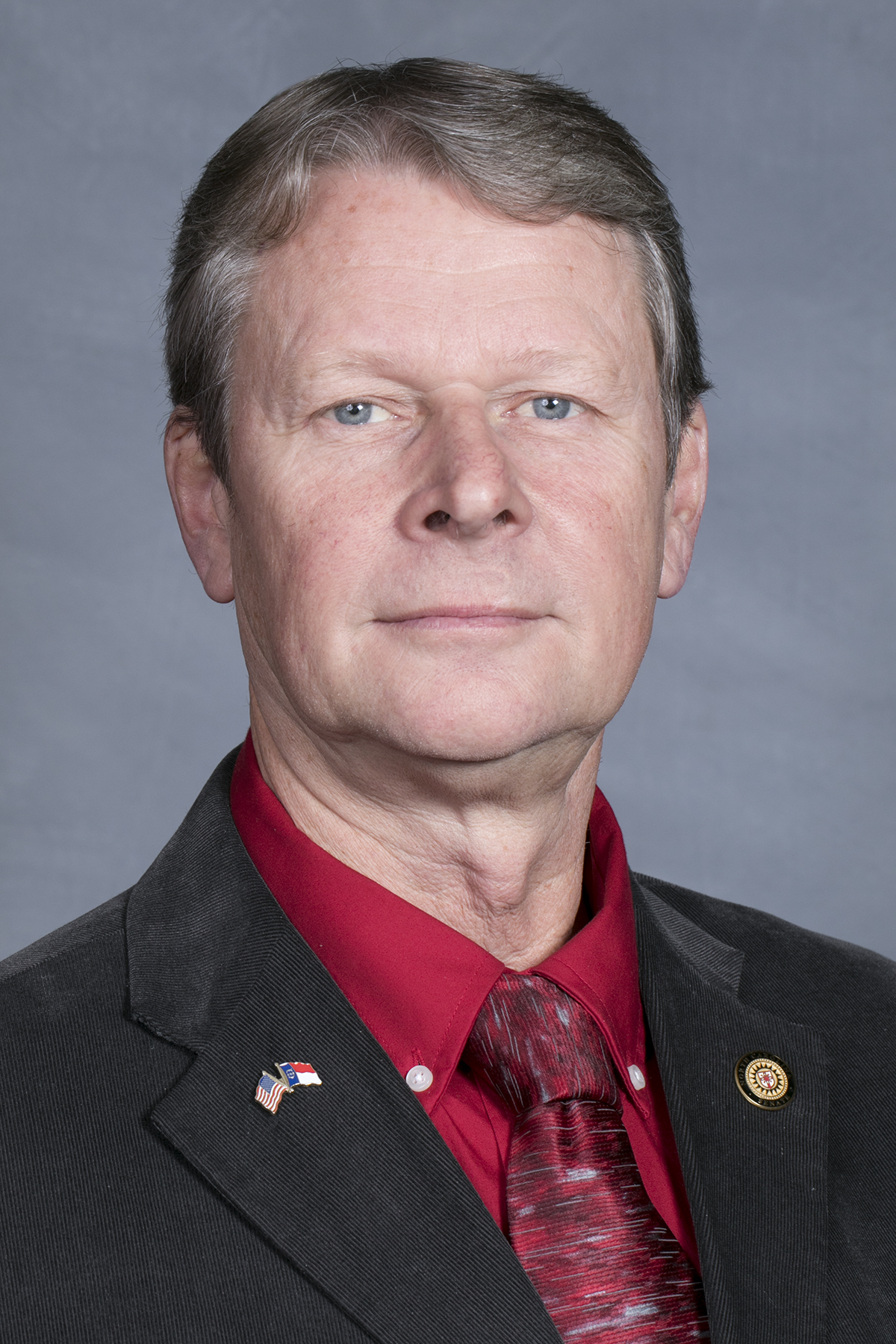

Member of the North Carolina Senate from the 29th district
- In office January 1, 2019 – January 1, 2021
- Preceded by: Cathy Dunn (Redistricting)
- Succeeded by: Steve Jarvis

Personal details
- Born: Johnny Edward Gallimore; 1964 (age 61–62)
- Party: Republican
- Spouse: Kelly
- Education: Davidson County Community College
- Occupation: businessman

Johnny Edward Gallimore (born 1964) is a former Republican member of the North Carolina State Senate, who represented the 29th district from 2019 to 2021. He also ran unsuccessfully for the Davidson County Board of Commissioners in 2010, the state senate in 2012, 2014, 2016, 2020, 2022, 2026, and for the state house in 2024.

== Committee assignments ==
=== 2019–2020 session ===
- Appropriations
- Appropriations - Agriculture, Natural and Economic Resources
- Agriculture, Energy, and Environment
- Pensions and Retirement and Aging
- State and Local Government

== Electoral history ==
=== 2026 ===
North Carolina Senate 30th district Republican primary election, 2026
Party	Candidate	Votes	%
Republican	Steve Jarvis (incumbent)	15,407	75.54%
Republican	Eddie Gallimore	4,989	24.46%
Total votes		20,396	100%

=== 2024 ===
North Carolina House of Representatives 80th district Republican primary election, 2024
Party	Candidate	Votes	%
Republican	Sam Watford (incumbent)	5,931	50.32%
Republican	Eddie Gallimore	5,855	49.68%
Total votes		11,786	100%

=== 2022 ===
North Carolina Senate 30th district Republican primary election, 2022
Party	Candidate	Votes	%
Republican	Steve Jarvis (incumbent)	15,986	65.69%
Republican	Eddie Gallimore	8,348	34.31%
Total votes		24,334	100%

=== 2020 ===
North Carolina Senate 29th district Republican primary election, 2020
Party	Candidate	Votes	%
Republican	Steve Jarvis	11,617	53.30%
Republican	Eddie Gallimore (incumbent)	10,179	46.70%
Total votes		21,796	100%

=== 2018 ===
North Carolina Senate 29th district Republican primary election, 2018
Party	Candidate	Votes	%
Republican	Eddie Gallimore	11,775	55.48%
Republican	Sam Watford	9,448	44.52%
Total votes		21,223	100%

2018 North Carolina Senate 29th district general election, 2018
Party	Candidate	Votes	%
Republican	Eddie Gallimore	46,974	71.64%
Democratic	Cheraton Love	18,594	28.36%
Total votes		65,568	100%
Republican hold			

=== 2016 ===
North Carolina Senate 33rd district Republican primary election, 2016
Party	Candidate	Votes	%
Republican	Cathy Dunn	9,615	40.14%
Republican	Eddie Gallimore	7,724	32.24%
Republican	Joe D. Kennedy	6,616	27.62%
Total votes		23,955	100%

=== 2014 ===
North Carolina Senate 33rd district Republican primary election, 2014
Party	Candidate	Votes	%
Republican	Stan Bingham (incumbent)	8,210	63.87%
Republican	Eddie Gallimore	4,645	36.13%
Total votes		12,855	100%

=== 2012 ===
North Carolina Senate 33rd district Republican primary election, 2012
Party	Candidate	Votes	%
Republican	Stan Bingham (incumbent)	9,135	40.44%
Republican	Eddie Gallimore	8,630	38.21%
Republican	Sam Watford	4,823	21.35%
Total votes		22,588	100%

=== 2010 ===
Davidson County Board of Commissioners Republican primary election, 2010
Party	Candidate	Votes	%
Republican	Billy Joe Kepley	8,217	15.80%
Republican	Don W. Truell	6,941	13.35%
Republican	Sam Watford	6,811	13.10%
Republican	Todd Yates	5,359	10.31%
Republican	Larry Allen	5,253	10.10%
Republican	Eddie Gallimore	4,525	8.70%
Republican	Dwight D. Cornelison	3,995	7.68%
Republican	Kenneth "Stump" Cavender	3,273	6.29%
Republican	Owen Moore	3,267	6.28%
Republican	Joseph Lee Byerly	2,276	4.38%
Republican	Eric Osborne	2,077	3.99%
Total votes		51,994	100%

North Carolina Senate
Preceded by Jerry Tillman	Member of the North Carolina Senate from the 29th district 2019–2021	Succeeded by Steve Jarvis
