= North Carolina's 13th House district =

American legislative district

North Carolina's 13th State House of Representatives district
Representative
Celeste Cairns; R–Emerald Isle
- Demographics: 80% White; 7% Black; 7% Hispanic; 1% Asian; 5% Multiracial
- Population (2024): 85,966

North Carolina's 13th House district is one of 120 districts in the North Carolina House of Representatives. It has been represented by Republican Celeste Cairns since 2023.

== Geography ==
Since 2023, the district has included all of Carteret County, as well as part of Craven County. The district overlaps with the 2nd and 3rd Senate districts.

== District officeholders ==
=== Multi-member district ===
Representative	Party	Dates	Notes	Representative	Party	Dates	Notes	Representative	Party	Dates	Notes	Counties
Clyde Collier (Hallsboro)	Democratic	January 1, 1967 – January 1, 1969		Odell Williamson (Shallotte)	Democratic	January 1, 1967 – January 1, 1969	Redistricted from the Brunswick County district.					1967–1973; All of Columbus and Brunswick counties.
R. C. Soles Jr. (Tabor City)	Democratic	January 1, 1969 – January 1, 1973	Redistricted to the 19th district.	Arthur Wiliamson (Chadbourn)	Democratic	January 1, 1969 – January 1, 1971						1967–1973; All of Columbus and Brunswick counties.
R. C. Soles Jr. (Tabor City)	Democratic	January 1, 1969 – January 1, 1973	Redistricted to the 19th district.	Tommy Harrelson (Southport)	Republican	January 1, 1971 – January 1, 1973	Redistricted to the 11th district.					1967–1973; All of Columbus and Brunswick counties.
James Ramsey (Roxboro)	Democratic	January 1, 1973 – January 1, 1975	Redistricted from the 17th district.	William Watkins (Oxford)	Democratic	January 1, 1973 – January 1, 1983	Redistricted from the 17th district. Redistricted to the 22nd district.	Bobby Rogers (Henderson)	Democratic	January 1, 1973 – January 1, 1977	Redistricted from the 16th district.	1973–1983; All of Caswell, Person, Granville, Vance, and Warren counties.
T. W. Ellis Jr. (Henderson)	Democratic	January 1, 1975 – January 1, 1983	Redistricted to the 22nd district.	William Watkins (Oxford)	Democratic	January 1, 1973 – January 1, 1983	Redistricted from the 17th district. Redistricted to the 22nd district.	Bobby Rogers (Henderson)	Democratic	January 1, 1973 – January 1, 1977	Redistricted from the 16th district.	1973–1983; All of Caswell, Person, Granville, Vance, and Warren counties.
T. W. Ellis Jr. (Henderson)	Democratic	January 1, 1975 – January 1, 1983	Redistricted to the 22nd district.	William Watkins (Oxford)	Democratic	January 1, 1973 – January 1, 1983	Redistricted from the 17th district. Redistricted to the 22nd district.	John Church (Henderson)	Democratic	January 1, 1977 – January 1, 1983	Redistricted to the 22nd district.	1973–1983; All of Caswell, Person, Granville, Vance, and Warren counties.
Harry Payne Jr. (Wilmington)	Democratic	January 1, 1983 – January 1, 1993	Redistricted from the 12th district. Redistricted to the single-member district and retired to run for Labor Commissioner.	S. Thomas Rhodes (Wilmington)	Republican	January 1, 1983 – January 1, 1985	Redistricted from the 12th district.					1983–1993; Most of New Hanover County.
Harry Payne Jr. (Wilmington)	Democratic	January 1, 1983 – January 1, 1993	Redistricted from the 12th district. Redistricted to the single-member district and retired to run for Labor Commissioner.	Alex Hall (Wilmington)	Democratic	January 1, 1985 – January 1, 1991						1983–1993; Most of New Hanover County.
Harry Payne Jr. (Wilmington)	Democratic	January 1, 1983 – January 1, 1993	Redistricted from the 12th district. Redistricted to the single-member district and retired to run for Labor Commissioner.	Karen Gottovi (Wilmington)	Democratic	January 1, 1991 – January 1, 1993	Redistricted to the single-member district.					1983–1993; Most of New Hanover County.

=== Single-member district ===
Representative	Party	Dates	Notes	Counties
Karen Gottovi (Wilmington)	Democratic	January 1, 1993 – January 1, 1995	Redistricted from the multi-member district.	1993–2003; Part of New Hanover County.
Danny McComas (Wilmington)	Republican	January 1, 1995 – January 1, 2003	Redistricted to the 19th district.	1993–2003; Part of New Hanover County.
Jean Preston (Emerald Isle)	Republican	January 1, 2003 – January 1, 2007	Redistricted from the 4th district. Retired to run for State Senate.	2003–2005; All of Carteret County. Part of Onslow County.
Jean Preston (Emerald Isle)	Republican	January 1, 2003 – January 1, 2007	Redistricted from the 4th district. Retired to run for State Senate.	2005–2023; All of Carteret and Jones counties.
Pat McElraft (Emerald Isle)	Republican	January 1, 2007 – January 1, 2023	Retired.	2005–2023; All of Carteret and Jones counties.
Celeste Cairns (Emerald Isle)	Republican	January 1, 2023 – Present		2023–Present; All of Carteret County. Part of Craven County.

== Election results ==
=== 2024 ===
North Carolina House of Representatives 13th district Democratic primary election, 2024
Party	Candidate	Votes	%
Democratic	Katie Tomberlin	2,341	62.24%
Democratic	Melvin Cooper	1,420	37.76%
Total votes		3,761	100%

North Carolina House of Representatives 13th district general election, 2024
Party	Candidate	Votes	%
Republican	Celeste Cairns (incumbent)	35,181	69.89%
Democratic	Katie Tomberlin	15,158	30.11%
Total votes		50,339	100%
Republican hold			

=== 2022 ===
North Carolina House of Representatives 13th district Republican primary election, 2022
Party	Candidate	Votes	%
Republican	Celeste Cairns	6,271	54.88%
Republican	Pete Benton	3,984	34.86%
Republican	Eden Gordon Hill	1,172	10.26%
Total votes		11,427	100%

North Carolina House of Representatives 13th district general election, 2022
Party	Candidate	Votes	%
Republican	Celeste Cairns	25,850	71.32%
Democratic	Katie Tomberlin	10,394	28.68%
Total votes		36,244	100%
Republican hold			

=== 2020 ===
North Carolina House of Representatives 13th district general election, 2020
Party	Candidate	Votes	%
Republican	Pat McElraft (incumbent)	33,477	71.65%
Democratic	Buck Bayliff	13,246	28.35%
Total votes		46,723	100%
Republican hold			

=== 2018 ===
North Carolina House of Representatives 13th district Republican primary election, 2018
Party	Candidate	Votes	%
Republican	Pat McElraft (incumbent)	5,746	75.52%
Republican	Blake Beadle	1,863	24.48%
Total votes		7,609	100%

North Carolina House of Representatives 13th district general election, 2018
Party	Candidate	Votes	%
Republican	Pat McElraft (incumbent)	22,755	72.76%
Unaffliated	Pene diMaio	8,518	27.24%
Total votes		31,273	100%
Republican hold			

=== 2016 ===
North Carolina House of Representatives 13th district general election, 2016
Party	Candidate	Votes	%
Republican	Pat McElraft (incumbent)	29,188	70.82%
Democratic	Rodney Alexander	12,024	29.18%
Total votes		41,212	100%
Republican hold			

=== 2014 ===
North Carolina House of Representatives 13th district general election, 2014
Party	Candidate	Votes	%
Republican	Pat McElraft (incumbent)	19,946	69.73%
Democratic	Jim Nolan	8,659	30.27%
Total votes		28,605	100%
Republican hold			

=== 2012 ===
North Carolina House of Representatives 13th district general election, 2012
Party	Candidate	Votes	%
Republican	Pat McElraft (incumbent)	28,416	88.34%
Libertarian	Wyatt Rike	3,752	11.66%
Total votes		32,168	100%
Republican hold			

=== 2010 ===
North Carolina House of Representatives 13th district Republican primary election, 2010
Party	Candidate	Votes	%
Republican	Pat McElraft (incumbent)	4,354	77.43%
Republican	Wyatt Rike	1,269	22.57%
Total votes		5,623	100%

North Carolina House of Representatives 13th district general election, 2010
Party	Candidate	Votes	%
Republican	Pat McElraft (incumbent)	19,491	73.26%
Democratic	Craig K. Hassler	7,113	26.74%
Total votes		26,604	100%
Republican hold			

=== 2008 ===
North Carolina House of Representatives 13th district general election, 2008
Party	Candidate	Votes	%
Republican	Pat McElraft (incumbent)	22,022	56.85%
Democratic	Barbara Garrity-Blake	16,714	43.15%
Total votes		38,736	100%
Republican hold			

=== 2006 ===
North Carolina House of Representatives 13th district Republican primary election, 2006
Party	Candidate	Votes	%
Republican	Pat McElraft	4,491	68.06%
Republican	Dave Fowler	2,108	31.94%
Total votes		6,599	100%

North Carolina House of Representatives 13th district general election, 2006
Party	Candidate	Votes	%
Republican	Pat McElraft	14,304	58.37%
Democratic	G. Malcolm Fulcher, Jr.	10,201	41.63%
Total votes		24,505	100%
Republican hold			

=== 2004 ===
North Carolina House of Representatives 13th district general election, 2004
Party	Candidate	Votes	%
Republican	Jean Preston (incumbent)	20,607	70.77%
Democratic	Malcolm Fulcher	8,513	29.23%
Total votes		29,120	100%
Republican hold			

=== 2002 ===
North Carolina House of Representatives District 13th district Democratic primary election, 2002
Party	Candidate	Votes	%
Democratic	Ronald Smith (incumbent)	4,327	71.75%
Democratic	Bruce Etheridge	1,704	28.25%
Total votes		6,031	100%

North Carolina House of Representatives District 13th district general election, 2002
Party	Candidate	Votes	%
Republican	Jean Preston (incumbent)	12,530	56.48%
Democratic	Ronald Smith (incumbent)	9,653	43.52%
Total votes		22,183	100%
Republican hold			

=== 2000 ===
North Carolina House of Representatives 13th district general election, 2000
Party	Candidate	Votes	%
Republican	Danny McComas (incumbent)	20,214	100%
Total votes		20,214	100%
Republican hold			
