= North Carolina's 3rd House district =

American legislative district

North Carolina's 3rd State House of Representatives district
Representative
Steve Tyson; R–New Bern
- Demographics: 66% White; 20% Black; 6% Hispanic; 3% Asian; 1% Other; 3% Multiracial
- Population (2024): 85,794

North Carolina's 3rd House district is one of 120 districts in the North Carolina House of Representatives. It has been represented by Republican Steve Tyson since 2021.

== Geography ==
Since 2019, the district has included part of Craven County. The district overlaps with the 3rd Senate district.

== District officeholders ==
=== Multi-member district ===
Representative	Party	Dates	Notes	Representative	Party	Dates	Notes	Representative	Party	Dates	Notes	Counties
District created January 1, 1967.
Nelson Taylor (Morehead City)	Democratic	January 1, 1967 – January 1, 1969		James Sugg (New Bern)	Democratic	January 1, 1967 – January 1, 1969		Ruffin Godwin (New Bern)	Democratic	January 1, 1967 – January 1, 1971	Redistricted from the Craven County district.	1967–1973; All of Carteret, Craven, and Pamlico counties.
Henry Boshamer (Morehead City)	Democratic	January 1, 1969 – January 1, 1971		Chris Barker Jr. (New Bern)	Democratic	January 1, 1969 – January 1, 1987		Ruffin Godwin (New Bern)	Democratic	January 1, 1967 – January 1, 1971	Redistricted from the Craven County district.	1967–1973; All of Carteret, Craven, and Pamlico counties.
Ronald Earl Mason (Beaufort)	Democratic	January 1, 1971 – January 1, 1973	Redistricted to the 4th district.	Chris Barker Jr. (New Bern)	Democratic	January 1, 1969 – January 1, 1987		Joe Bright (Vanceboro)	Democratic	January 1, 1971 – January 1, 1981		1967–1973; All of Carteret, Craven, and Pamlico counties.
Daniel Lilley (Kinston)	Democratic	January 1, 1973 – January 1, 1993	Redistricted from the 9th district.	Chris Barker Jr. (New Bern)	Democratic	January 1, 1969 – January 1, 1987		Joe Bright (Vanceboro)	Democratic	January 1, 1971 – January 1, 1981		1973–1983; All of Lenoir, Jones, Craven, and Pamlico counties.
Daniel Lilley (Kinston)	Democratic	January 1, 1973 – January 1, 1993	Redistricted from the 9th district.	Chris Barker Jr. (New Bern)	Democratic	January 1, 1969 – January 1, 1987		Gerald Anderson (Bridgeton)	Democratic	January 1, 1981 – January 1, 1993		1973–1983; All of Lenoir, Jones, Craven, and Pamlico counties.
Daniel Lilley (Kinston)	Democratic	January 1, 1973 – January 1, 1993	Redistricted from the 9th district.	Chris Barker Jr. (New Bern)	Democratic	January 1, 1969 – January 1, 1987		Gerald Anderson (Bridgeton)	Democratic	January 1, 1981 – January 1, 1993		1983–1993; All of Lenoir, Craven, and Pamlico counties.
Daniel Lilley (Kinston)	Democratic	January 1, 1973 – January 1, 1993	Redistricted from the 9th district.	Bev Perdue (New Bern)	Democratic	January 1, 1987 – January 1, 1991	Retired to run for State Senate.	Gerald Anderson (Bridgeton)	Democratic	January 1, 1981 – January 1, 1993		1983–1993; All of Lenoir, Craven, and Pamlico counties.
Daniel Lilley (Kinston)	Democratic	January 1, 1973 – January 1, 1993	Redistricted from the 9th district.	William Wainwright (Havelock)	Democratic	January 1, 1991 – January 1, 1993	Redistricted to the 79th district.	Gerald Anderson (Bridgeton)	Democratic	January 1, 1981 – January 1, 1993		1983–1993; All of Lenoir, Craven, and Pamlico counties.

=== Single-member district ===
Representative	Party	Dates	Notes	Counties
John Nichols (New Bern)	Republican	January 1, 1993 – January 1, 1999	Lost re-election.	1993–2003; Parts of Craven and Pamlico counties.
Scott Thomas (New Bern)	Democratic	January 1, 1999 – January 1, 2001	Retired to run for State Senate.	1993–2003; Parts of Craven and Pamlico counties.
Alice Graham Underhill (New Bern)	Democratic	January 1, 2001 – January 1, 2003	Lost re-election.	1993–2003; Parts of Craven and Pamlico counties.
Michael Gorman (Trent Woods)	Republican	January 1, 2003 – January 1, 2005	Lost re-nomination.	2003–2013; All of Pamlico County. Part of Craven County.
Alice Graham Underhill (New Bern)	Democratic	January 1, 2005 – January 1, 2011	Lost re-election.	2003–2013; All of Pamlico County. Part of Craven County.
Norman Sanderson (Minnesott Beach)	Republican	January 1, 2011 – January 1, 2013	Retired to run for State Senate.	2003–2013; All of Pamlico County. Part of Craven County.
Michael Speciale (New Bern)	Republican	January 1, 2013 – January 1, 2021	Retired.	2013–2019; All of Pamlico County. Parts of Craven and Beaufort counties.
Michael Speciale (New Bern)	Republican	January 1, 2013 – January 1, 2021	Retired.	2019–Present; Part of Craven County.
Steve Tyson (New Bern)	Republican	January 1, 2021 – Present		2019–Present; Part of Craven County.

== Election results ==
=== 2024 ===
North Carolina House of Representatives 3rd district Democratic primary election, 2024
Party	Candidate	Votes	%
Democratic	Linda Moore	1,948	38.56%
Democratic	Dorothea Downing White	1,820	36.03%
Democratic	Cynthia Evans-Robinson	1,284	25.42%
Total votes		5,052	100%

North Carolina House of Representatives 3rd district general election, 2024
Party	Candidate	Votes	%
Republican	Steve Tyson (incumbent)	29,825	61.68%
Democratic	Linda Moore	18,530	38.32%
Total votes		48,355	100%
Republican hold			

=== 2022 ===
North Carolina House of Representatives 3rd district general election, 2022
Party	Candidate	Votes	%
Republican	Steve Tyson (incumbent)	23,739	100%
Total votes		23,739	100%
Republican hold			

=== 2020 ===
North Carolina House of Representatives 3rd district Republican Primary election, 2020
Party	Candidate	Votes	%
Republican	Steve Tyson	4,445	52.58%
Republican	Jim Kohr	1,783	21.09%
Republican	Eric Queen	1,474	17.44%
Republican	Guy D. Smith	751	8.88%
Total votes		8,453	100%

North Carolina House of Representatives 3rd district general election, 2020
Party	Candidate	Votes	%
Republican	Steve Tyson	22,585	60.78%
Democratic	Dorothea Downing White	14,575	39.22%
Total votes		37,160	100%
Republican hold			

=== 2018 ===
North Carolina House of Representatives 3rd district Democratic primary election, 2018
Party	Candidate	Votes	%
Democratic	Barbara Lee	2,451	67.65%
Democratic	Charles Dudley	1,172	32.35%
Total votes		3,623	100%

North Carolina House of Representatives 3rd district Republican primary election, 2018
Party	Candidate	Votes	%
Republican	Michael Speciale (incumbent)	2,947	57.25%
Republican	Eric Queen	2,201	42.75%
Total votes		5,148	100%

North Carolina House of Representatives 3rd district general election, 2018
Party	Candidate	Votes	%
Republican	Michael Speciale (incumbent)	14,068	54.90%
Democratic	Barbara Lee	10,874	42.44%
Libertarian	T. Lee Horne III	683	2.67%
Total votes		25,625	100%
Republican hold			

=== 2016 ===
North Carolina House of Representatives 3rd district general election, 2016
Party	Candidate	Votes	%
Republican	Michael Speciale (incumbent)	23,273	64.81%
Democratic	Marva Fisher Baldwin	12,638	35.19%
Total votes		35,911	100%
Republican hold			

=== 2014 ===
North Carolina House of Representatives 3rd district general election, 2014
Party	Candidate	Votes	%
Republican	Michael Speciale (incumbent)	14,584	58.09%
Democratic	Whit Whitley	10,524	41.91%
Total votes		25,108	100%
Republican hold			

=== 2012 ===
North Carolina House of Representatives 3rd district Republican primary election, 2012
Party	Candidate	Votes	%
Republican	Michael Speciale	4,090	58.45%
Republican	Wayne Langston	1,613	23.05%
Republican	Clayton Tripp	1,294	18.49%
Total votes		6,997	100%

North Carolina House of Representatives 3rd district general election, 2012
Party	Candidate	Votes	%
Republican	Michael Speciale	20,811	59.24%
Democratic	Robert B. Clayton	14,320	40.76%
Total votes		35,131	100%
Republican hold			

=== 2010 ===
North Carolina House of Representatives 3rd district general election, 2010
Party	Candidate	Votes	%
Republican	Norman Sanderson	14,620	63.69%
Democratic	Alice Graham Underhill (incumbent)	7,859	34.24%
Libertarian	Herb Sobel	477	2.08%
Total votes		22,956	100%
Republican gain from Democratic			

=== 2008 ===
North Carolina House of Representatives 3rd district Republican primary election, 2008
Party	Candidate	Votes	%
Republican	Norman Sanderson	2,708	57.20%
Republican	Renee Sisk	2,026	42.80%
Total votes		4,734	100%

North Carolina House of Representatives 3rd district general election, 2008
Party	Candidate	Votes	%
Democratic	Alice Graham Underhill (incumbent)	16,943	49.92%
Republican	Norman Sanderson	16,173	47.65%
Libertarian	Herb Sobel	825	2.43%
Total votes		33,941	100%
Democratic hold			

=== 2006 ===
North Carolina House of Representatives 3rd district Republican primary election, 2006
Party	Candidate	Votes	%
Republican	Michael Speciale	1,384	63.54%
Republican	Michael Gorman	794	36.46%
Total votes		2,178	100%

North Carolina House of Representatives 3rd district general election, 2006
Party	Candidate	Votes	%
Democratic	Alice Graham Underhill (incumbent)	10,772	55.70%
Republican	Michael Speciale	8,568	44.30%
Total votes		19,340	100%
Democratic hold			

=== 2004 ===
North Carolina House of Representatives 3rd district Republican primary election, 2004
Party	Candidate	Votes	%
Republican	Michael Speciale	1,559	44.67%
Republican	Michael Gorman (incumbent)	1,334	38.22%
Republican	John M. Nichols	453	12.98%
Republican	Kirby R. Braxton	144	4.13%
Total votes		3,490	100%

North Carolina House of Representatives 3rd district general election, 2004
Party	Candidate	Votes	%
Democratic	Alice Graham Underhill	15,156	51.18%
Republican	Michael Speciale	13,947	47.10%
Libertarian	Herbert M. Sobel	509	1.72%
Total votes		29,612	100%
Democratic gain from Republican			

=== 2002 ===
North Carolina House of Representatives 3rd district Republican primary election, 2002
Party	Candidate	Votes	%
Republican	Michael Gorman	2,388	55.25%
Republican	Joyce Hill King	1,028	23.79%
Republican	Michael Speciale	906	20.96%
Total votes		4,322	100%

North Carolina House of Representatives 3rd district general election, 2002
Party	Candidate	Votes	%
Republican	Michael Gorman	10,777	50.43%
Democratic	Alice Graham Underhill (incumbent)	10,594	49.57%
Total votes		21,371	100%
Republican gain from Democratic			

=== 2000 ===
North Carolina House of Representatives 3rd district general election, 2000
Party	Candidate	Votes	%
Democratic	Alice Graham Underhill	10,329	46.18%
Republican	John M. Nichols	9,099	40.68%
Independent	Bill Harper	2,937	13.13%
Total votes		22,365	100%
Democratic hold			
