= Alice Graham =

Alice Graham may refer to:

- Alice Graham (figure skater), in 2006 Canadian Figure Skating Championships
- Alice Graham Underhill
