= Bob Brinson =

American politician

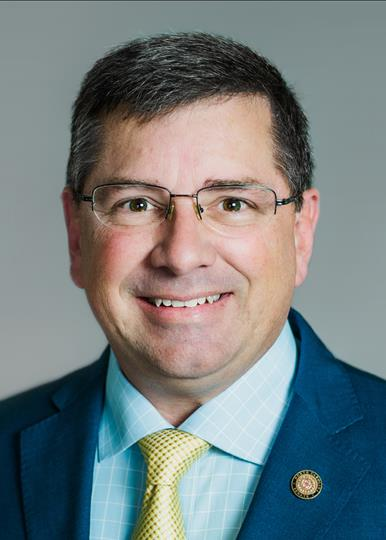

Member of the North Carolina Senate
- Incumbent
- Assumed office July 30, 2024
- Preceded by: Jim Perry
- Constituency: 2nd District (2023–2025); 3rd District (2025–Present)

Personal details
- Born: Robert Brinson Jr.
- Party: Republican
- Education: United States Military Academy at West Point (BA)

Robert "Bob" Brinson, Jr., is an American politician who has served as a member of the North Carolina Senate since July 30, 2024.

== Career ==
A Republican, he was appointed by Governor Roy Cooper to fill the vacancy in the 2nd district due to the resignation of Jim Perry. Brinson was elected to serve as Alderman of the Sixth Ward in New Bern, North Carolina, in May 2022. He attended the United States Military Academy at West Point and is a veteran of the United States Army. In the 2024 election, Brinson is a candidate in the 3rd district.

=== Electoral history ===
==== 2024 ====
North Carolina Senate 3rd district Republican primary election, 2024
Party	Candidate	Votes	%
Republican	Bob Brinson	13,211	54.41%
Republican	Michael Speciale	11,069	45.59%
Total votes		24,280	100%

North Carolina Senate 3rd district general election, 2024
Party	Candidate	Votes	%
Republican	Bob Brinson (incumbent)	64,025	59.99%
Democratic	Charles Dudley	42,704	40.01%
Total votes		106,729	100%
Republican hold			

North Carolina Senate
Preceded by Jim Perry	Member of the North Carolina Senate from the 2nd district 2024–2025	Succeeded by Norman Sanderson
Preceded by Bobby Hanig	Member of the North Carolina Senate from the 3rd district 2025–Present	Incumbent
