= Celeste Cairns =

American politician

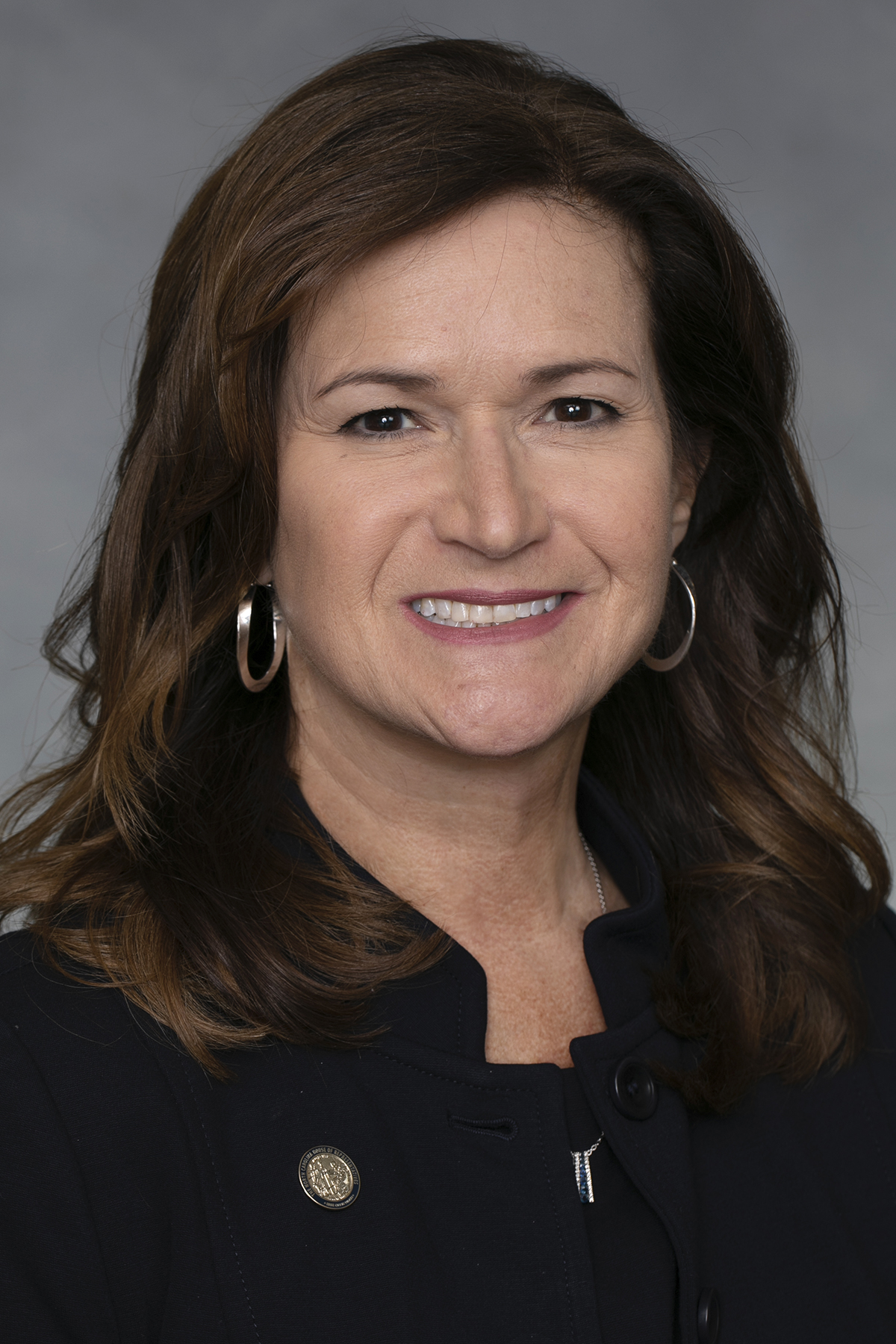

Member of the North Carolina House of Representatives from the 13th district
- Incumbent
- Assumed office January 1, 2023
- Preceded by: Pat McElraft

Personal details
- Born: Celeste Coppage
- Party: Republican
- Spouse: Rob
- Children: 2
- Education: University of Georgia (BBA)
- Occupation: Accountant
- Website: Official website

Celeste Coppage Cairns is a Republican member of the North Carolina House of Representatives who has represented the 13th district (including all of Carteret County, as well as parts of Craven County) since 2023. Cairns ran unsuccessfully in the Republican Primary in the 2019 North Carolina's 3rd congressional district special election.

== Committee assignments ==
=== 2023-2024 session ===
- Appropriations
- Appropriations - Agriculture and Economic Resources
- Banking
- Energy and Public Utilities
- Marine Resources and Aquaculture
- Military and Veterans Affairs

== Electoral history ==
=== 2022 ===
North Carolina House of Representatives 13th District Republican primary election, 2022
Party	Candidate	Votes	%
Republican	Celeste Cairns	6,271	54.88%
Republican	Pete Benton	3,984	34.86%
Republican	Eden Gordon Hill	1,172	10.26%
Total votes		11,427	100%

North Carolina House of Representatives 13th district general election, 2022
Party	Candidate	Votes	%
Republican	Celeste Cairns	25,850	71.32%
Democratic	Katie Tomberlin	10,394	28.68%
Total votes		36,244	100%
Republican hold			

=== 2019 ===
North Carolina's 3rd congressional district special election, 2019
Party	Candidate	Votes	%
Republican	Greg Murphy	9,530	22.51%
Republican	Joan Perry	6,536	15.44%
Republican	Phil Shepard	5,101	12.05%
Republican	Michael Speciale	4,022	9.50%
Republican	Phil Law	3,690	8.72%
Republican	Eric Rouse	3,258	7.70%
Republican	Jeff Moore	2,280	5.39%
Republican	Francis De Luca	1,670	3.95%
Republican	Celeste Cairns	1,467	3.47%
Republican	Chimer Davis Clark Jr.	1,092	2.58%
Republican	Michele Nix	915	2.16%
Republican	Graham Boyd	897	2.12%
Republican	Paul Beaumont	805	1.90%
Republican	Mike Payment	537	1.27%
Republican	Don Cox	251	0.59%
Republican	Kevin Baiko	171	0.40%
Republican	Gary Ceres	108	0.26%
Total votes		42,330	100%

North Carolina House of Representatives
Preceded by Pat McElraft	Member of the North Carolina House of Representatives from the 13th district 2023–Present	Incumbent
