= Scott Thomas (district attorney) =

American politician from North Carolina

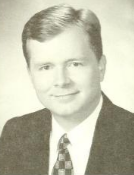
- Thomas in 1999 as a state representative

District Attorney for North Carolina's 4th District
- Incumbent
- Assumed office January 30, 2006
- Preceded by: W. David McFadyen Jr.

Member of the North Carolina Senate
- In office January 1, 2001 – January 30, 2006
- Preceded by: Bev Perdue
- Succeeded by: C.W. "Pete" Bland
- Constituency: 3rd District (2001-2003); 2nd District (2003-2006)

Member of the North Carolina House of Representatives from the 3rd district
- In office January 1, 1999 – January 1, 2001
- Preceded by: John M. Nichols
- Succeeded by: Alice Graham Underhill

Personal details
- Born: July 19, 1966 (age 60)
- Party: Republican
- Education: East Carolina University (BS); North Carolina Central University (JD)
- Profession: Attorney

Scott Thomas (born July 19, 1966) is a Republican politician and attorney who serves as the District Attorney for North Carolina Prosecutorial District 4. He previously served in both the North Carolina House of Representatives and North Carolina Senate.

== Early life and career ==
In addition to his work in the General Assembly, Thomas was a partner in the New Bern law firm Chesnutt, Clemmons, Thomas, and Peacock. He quit this post upon appointment as District Attorney. His wife, Sherri, is an elementary school principal and they are the parents of three daughters.

Thomas is an alumnus of East Carolina University in Greenville, NC where he earned a B.S. in Political Science and was SGA President.

He graduated with a J.D from North Carolina Central University School of Law in 1992.

== North Carolina General Assembly ==
Thomas was elected to the North Carolina House of Representatives in 1998. He was then elected to the North Carolina Senate representing the 2nd senatorial district. On January 18, 2006, Thomas resigned as State Senator to become District Attorney. He was appointed to the vacant post on January 24 by Governor Mike Easley to replace W. David McFadyen Jr., who retired early. Thomas was sworn in on January 30. He has been elected District Attorney four times and is serving his fourth term. C.W. "Pete" Bland, the Sheriff of Craven County, North Carolina, was appointed to replace Thomas in the State Senate. Bland was defeated for election to a full term by Republican State Representative Jean Preston.

== District Attorney ==
Thomas is the North Carolina Prosecutorial District 4, which includes Carteret, Craven and Pamlico counties. He is a past President of the North Carolina Conference of District Attorneys and former Chairman of the Governor's Crime Commission.

North Carolina House of Representatives
Preceded by John M. Nichols	Member of the North Carolina House of Representatives from the 3rd district 1999–2001	Succeeded by Alice Graham Underhill
North Carolina Senate
Preceded by Bev Perdue	Member of the North Carolina Senate from the 3rd district 2001–2003	Succeeded by Clark Jenkins
Preceded by Frank Ballance	Member of the North Carolina Senate from the 2nd district 2003–2006	Succeeded by C. W. "Pete" Bland
Legal offices
Preceded by W. David McFadyen Jr.	District Attorney for North Carolina's 4th district 2006–present	Incumbent
