= Daniel F. McComas =

American politician from North Carolina

Representative Danny McComas
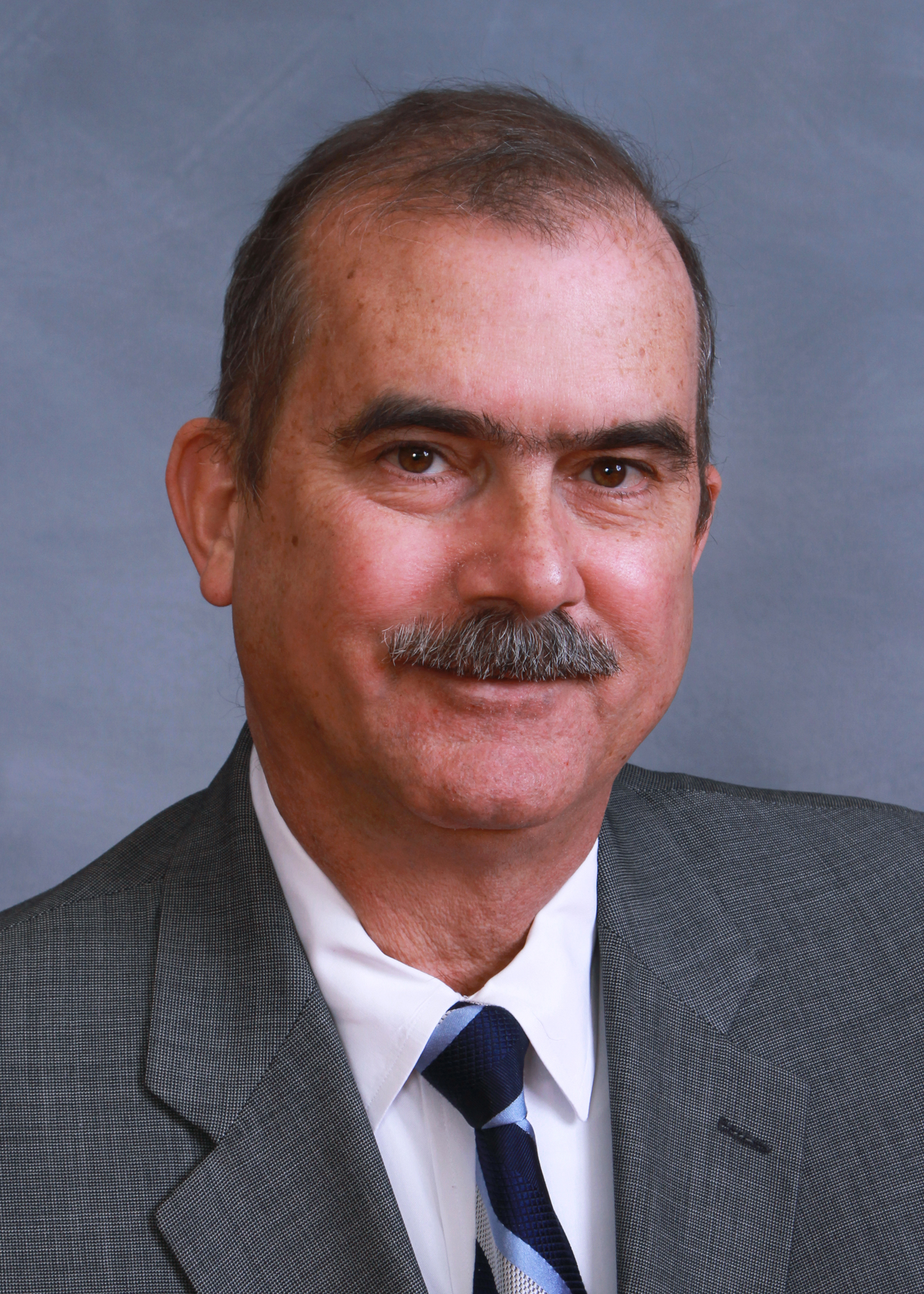

Member of the North Carolina House of Representatives
- In office January 1, 1995 – September 2, 2012
- Preceded by: Karen Elizabeth Eckberg Gottovi
- Succeeded by: Ted Davis Jr.
- Constituency: 13th District (1995-2003); 19th District (2003-2012)

Personal details
- Born: May 26, 1953 (age 73)
- Party: Republican
- Education: St. Bonaventure University (BBA)
- Occupation: Business Executive
- Website: http://dannymccomas.com/
- N.C. General Assembly ProfileMcComas Campaign Website

Daniel Francis McComas (born May 26, 1953, in San Juan, Puerto Rico) has served as a Republican member of the North Carolina General Assembly's North Carolina House of Representatives representing the state's nineteenth House district in New Hanover County. After nine terms in the state House, McComas announced that he would not seek re-election in 2012. Then, he resigned before the end of his final term to accept Gov. Beverly Perdue's appointment as chairman of the North Carolina Ports Authority. In that post, he succeeded another former state legislator, Carl J. Stewart, Jr.

A business executive from Wilmington, McComas was the first Hispanic member of the North Carolina General Assembly in 1995. He is a graduate of St. Bonaventure University in New York. In 1998, he received the Razor Walker Award from the University of North Carolina at Wilmington School of Education.

He is the owner and president of MCO Transport, a shipping company based in Wilmington, North Carolina.

North Carolina House of Representatives
Preceded by Karen Elizabeth Eckberg Gottovi	Member of the North Carolina House of Representatives from the 13th district 1995–2003	Succeeded by Jean Preston
Preceded by Donald Spencer Davis; Albert Leslie Cox Jr.	Member of the North Carolina House of Representatives from the 19th district 2003–2012	Succeeded by Ted Davis Jr.
