= Steve Tyson =

American politician

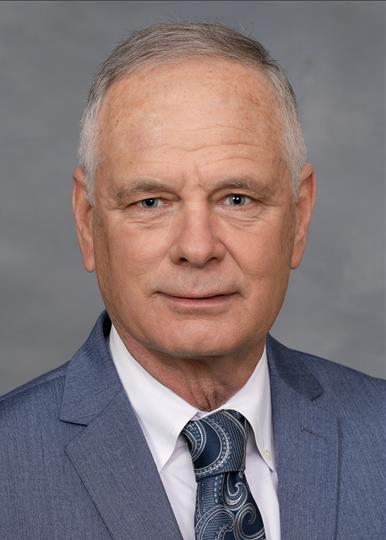

Member of the North Carolina House of Representatives from the 3rd district
- Incumbent
- Assumed office January 1, 2021
- Preceded by: Michael Speciale

Personal details
- Born: John Steven Tyson
- Party: Republican
- Spouse: Jana
- Occupation: General contractor, Real estate broker, Business owner
- Website: www.ncleg.gov/Members/Biography/H/774

John Steven "Steve" Tyson is a Republican member of the North Carolina House of Representatives and currently serves as the Deputy Majority Leader. He has represented the 3rd district (including parts of Craven County) since 2021. Tyson previously served in the United States Army from 1973 to 1976.

== Electoral history ==
North Carolina House of Representatives 3rd district Republican Primary election, 2020
| Party | Candidate | Votes | % |
|---|---|---|---|
| Republican | Steve Tyson | 4,445 | 52.58% |
| Republican | Jim Kohr | 1,783 | 21.09% |
| Republican | Eric Queen | 1,474 | 17.44% |
| Republican | Guy D. Smith | 751 | 8.88% |
| Total votes | | 8,453 | 100% |

North Carolina House of Representatives 3rd district general election, 2020
| Party | Candidate | Votes | % |
|---|---|---|---|
| Republican | Steve Tyson | 22,585 | 60.78% |
| Democratic | Dorothea Downing White | 14,575 | 39.22% |
| Total votes | | 37,160 | 100% |
| Republican hold | | | |

== Committee assignments ==
=== 2021-2022 session ===
- Commerce (Vice Chair)
- Education - Community Colleges
- Finance (Vice Chair)
- Health
- Insurance
- Transportation

North Carolina House of Representatives
| Preceded by Michael Speciale | Member of the North Carolina House of Representatives from the 3rd District; 2021–present | Incumbent |
