= Ted Davis Jr. =

American politician

Ted Davis
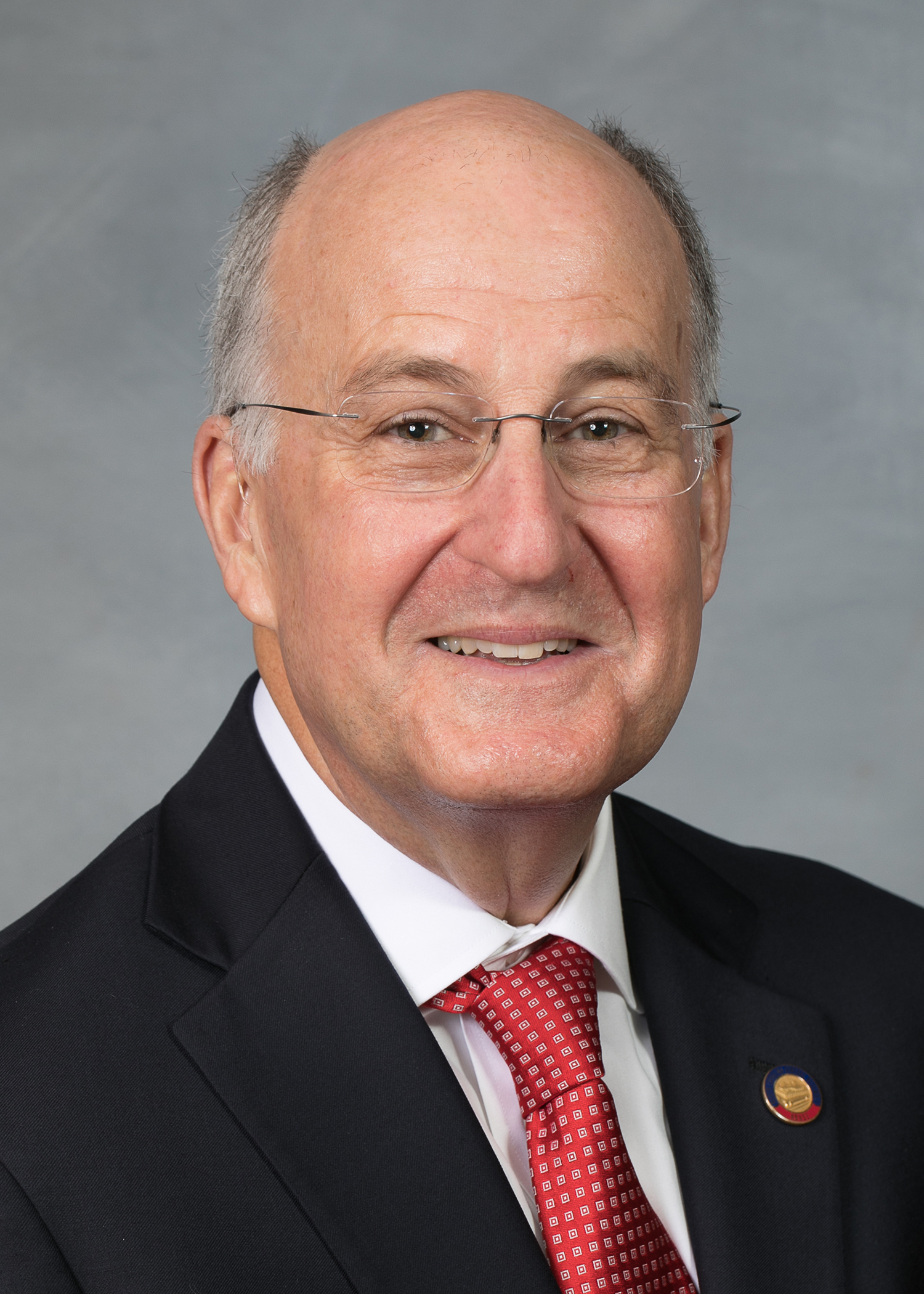

Member of the North Carolina House of Representatives
- Incumbent
- Assumed office September 26, 2012
- Preceded by: Danny McComas (19th); Holly Grange (20th)
- Constituency: 19th district (2012–2021); 20th district (2021–present)

Personal details
- Born: Robert Theodore Davis Jr. January 23, 1950 (age 76) Wilmington, North Carolina, U.S.
- Party: Republican
- Education: University of North Carolina, Chapel Hill (BA); Wake Forest University (JD)

Robert Theodore Davis Jr. (born January 23, 1950) is an American politician. He was elected to represent the 19th district in the North Carolina House of Representatives in 2012. Davis is a lawyer by profession.

== New Hanover Board of County Commissioners ==
While Davis was on the New Hanover Board of County Commissioners, the state offered the New Hanover County Health Department a grant to be used for contraceptives, family planning, and other reproductive services. Davis said it was a “sad day” when “taxpayers are asked to pay money to buy contraceptives” for women having sex without planning responsibly. Davis later brought up the $9,000 grant at the next meeting, where the all-male board voted 3–2 to accept the money. Davis expressed disapproval of multi-year contracts of any kind on several occasions and rejected a proposal to fund a five-year arts council in Wilmington because he was "opposed to multi-year commitment."

== Reproductive health ==
Davis voted for a budget that allocated millions to crisis pregnancy centers, clinics that "discourage women from getting abortions". Davis voted “yes” on HB 465, a controversial bill that extended the waiting period for abortions from one day to three, added safety and health inspection requirements for clinics and dictates the types of doctors who can perform abortions.

== GenX and the environment ==
Davis serves as senior chairman of the House Special Select Committee on River Water Quality. Davis voted for the 2017 budget, which decreased funding to the Clean Water Management Trust Fund by 18 percent. Davis voted for HB 56, the "junk drawer of environmental bills", where lawmakers added $435,000 for GenX research while also repealing the Outer Banks plastic bag ban and reducing county authority over landfills. The bill split $435K between UNCW and the Cape Fear Public Utility Authority to monitor and study GenX. Republican leaders criticized Cooper’s veto, focusing on the GenX issue. Davis’ committee, through collaboration with DEQ, successfully and unanimously passed HB189, which allocates of $2.3 million to DEQ for the study of GenX, in the House. However, the bill stalled in the Senate. Under Republican control, both DEQ and DHHS have faced massive budget cuts leaving the departments without adequate funding to study emerging contaminants like GenX. The cuts have forced DEQ to eliminate managers and replace experienced staff with cheaper labor while the Water Supply Protection Division lost a third of their employees. Republican lawmakers said that DEQ simply needs to shift resources to fix the deficits. Davis voted for the 2017 budget, which decreased funding to the Clean Water Management Trust Fund by 18 percent. Davis voted for H467, limiting compensation for damages for people whose property is damaged by spraying of animal waste. Davis voted for House Bill 576, which would allow landfill operators to use aerosolization to dispose of leachate by "spraying it into the air over their property" without a permit.

== HB2 and LGBTQ rights ==
Davis voted for House Bill 2, also known as the "bathroom bill". Davis was reluctant to comment on the discriminatory nature of the bill until a decision was handed down from a federal court after the U.S. Justice Department said the law violated Title VII and Title IX of the U.S. Civil Rights Act. Davis said that the fact that businesses left North Carolina because of HB2 was "a lot of hypocrisy" because companies like PayPal support business in "China and other countries" where they "torture, imprison, and kill homosexuals". Davis explained that he voted for HB2 because he wanted to support the Republican Caucus.

On a 2012 Civitas Institute candidate survey, Davis answered "agree" to the question, "Marriage between one man and one woman should be the only domestic legal union valid in North Carolina".

== Education ==
Davis voted "yes" to HB 1061 to replace Common Core in North Carolina. Davis voted for HB13, which would cap K-3 class sizes at 22 to 24 students, but failed to adequately fund the bill. The mandate for smaller class sizes will cost North Carolina school districts as much as $388 million more per year.

North Carolina House of Representatives
Preceded by Danny McComas	Member of the North Carolina House of Representatives from the 19th district 2012–2021	Succeeded by Charlie Miller
Preceded by Holly Grange	Member of the North Carolina House of Representatives from the 20th district 2021–present	Incumbent
