= Ernestine Bazemore =

American politician (1958/1959–2025)

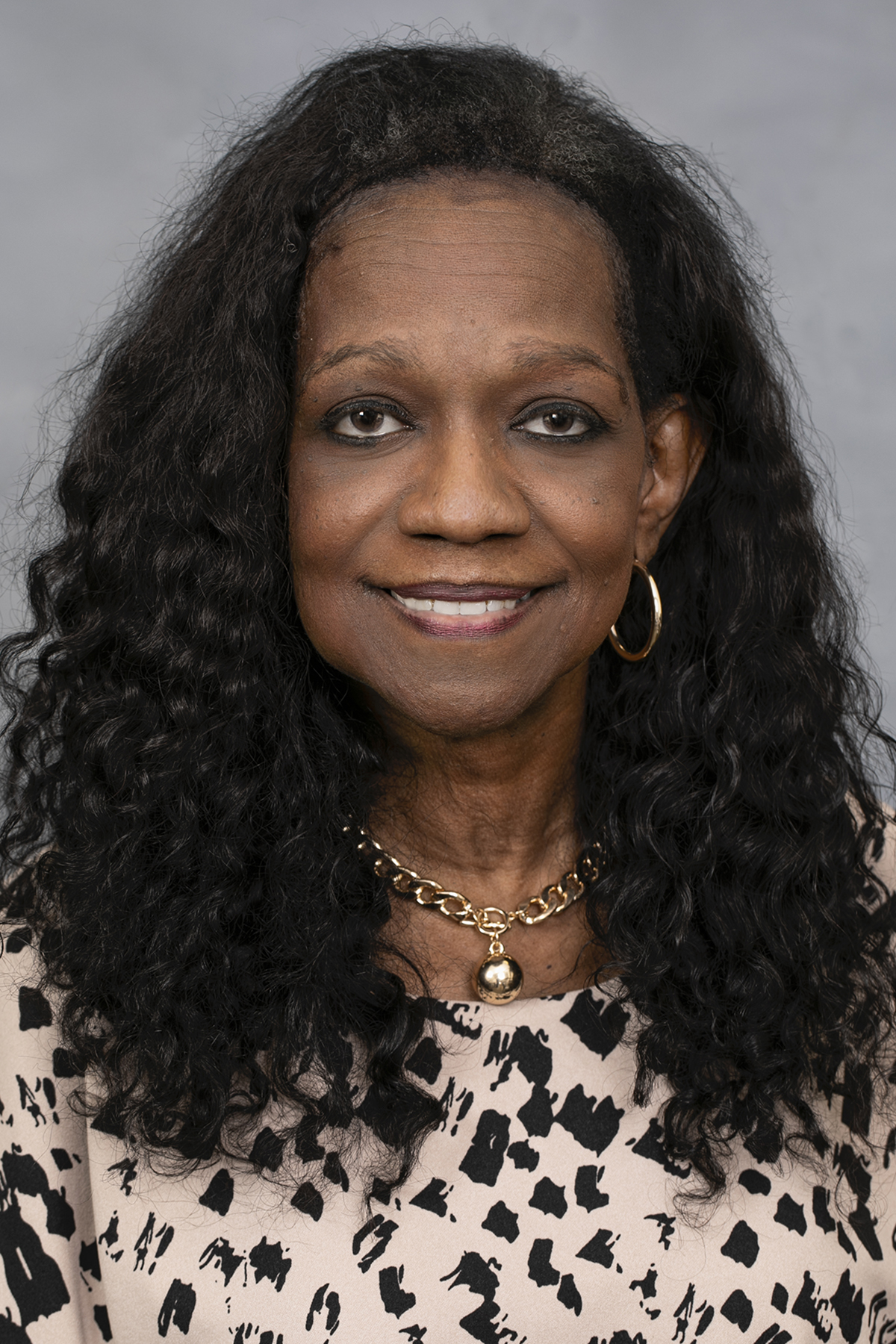
- Bazemore in 2021

Member of the North Carolina Senate from the 3rd district
- In office January 1, 2021 – January 1, 2023
- Preceded by: Erica Smith
- Succeeded by: Bobby Hanig

Personal details
- Born: 1958 or 1959
- Died: October 9, 2025 (aged 66)
- Party: Democratic
- Education: University of Mount Olive

Ernestine "Byrd" Bazemore (1958 or 1959 – October 9, 2025) was an American politician in the state of North Carolina.

== Early life and education ==
Bazemore graduated from Bertie High School in 1977. Bazemore earned a bachelor's of science degree in criminal justice and criminology from the University of Mount Olive.

== Career ==
Bazemore served as an educator. In 2014, Bazemore was first elected to the Bertie County Commissioner. She served as vice chair of the commission from 2016 to 2017, and as chair in 2018. On November 3, 2020, Bazemore won a close election against Republican nominee Thomas Hester Jr. for the North Carolina Senate seat represented the 3rd district. She won 52% of the vote. She assumed office on January 1, 2021. In early January 2021, Bazemore was appointed to three legislative committees: the State and Local Government committee, the Appropriations on General Government Committee, and the Pensions Committee.

Bazemore was defeated in the Democratic primary for re-election in 2022.

== Personal life and death ==
Bazemore lived in Windsor, North Carolina. She had three children.

Bazemore died October 9, 2025, at the age of 66.

North Carolina Senate
Preceded by Erica Smith	Member from the 3rd district 2021-2023	Succeeded by Bobby Hanig
