= Norman W. Sanderson =

American politician (born 1951)

Senator Norm Sanderson
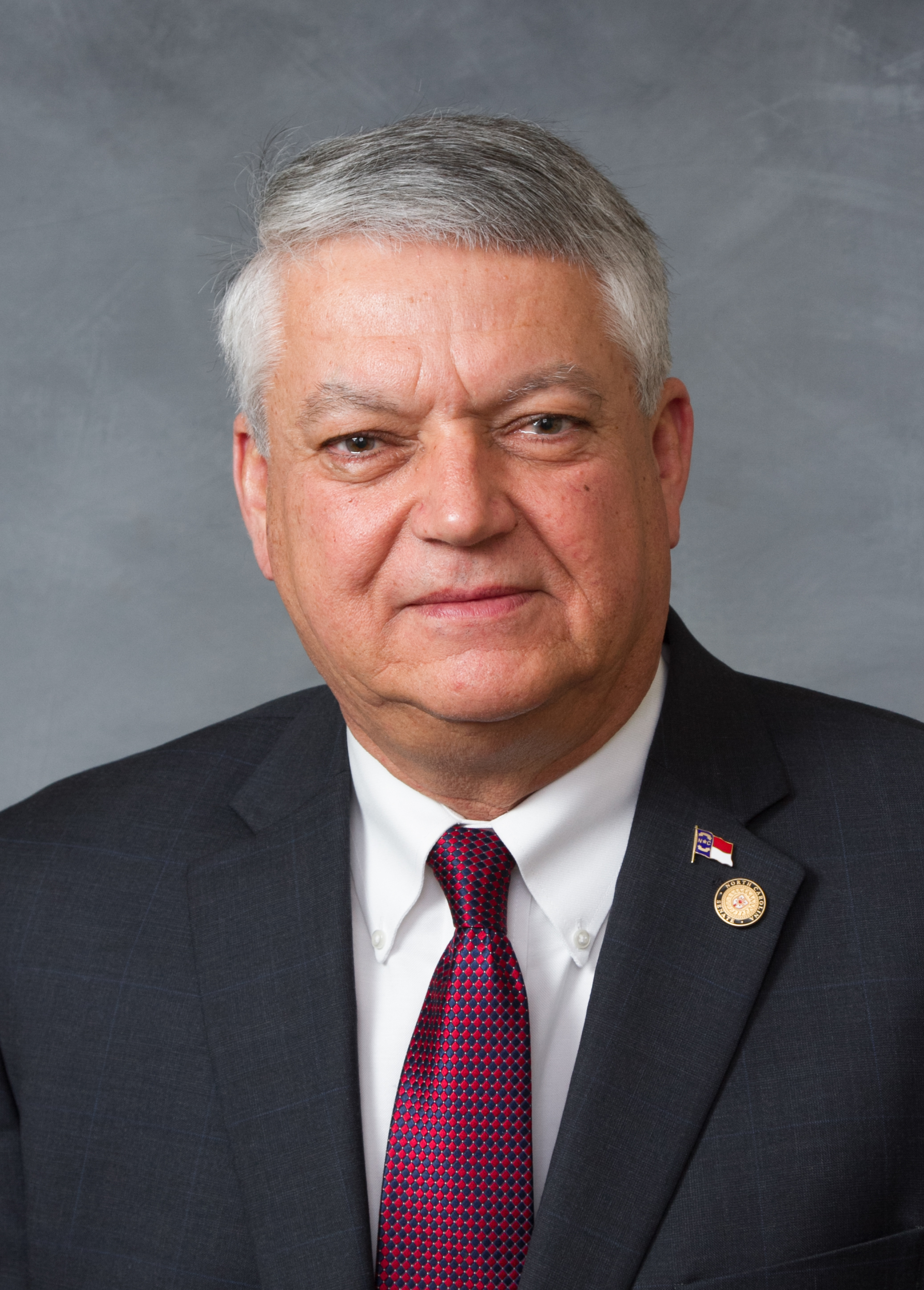

Member of the North Carolina Senate
- Incumbent
- Assumed office January 1, 2013
- Preceded by: Jean Preston
- Constituency: 2nd District (2013–2023, 2025–Present); 1st District (2023–2025)

Member of the North Carolina House of Representatives from the 3rd district
- In office January 1, 2011 – January 1, 2013
- Preceded by: Alice Graham Underhill
- Succeeded by: Michael Speciale

Personal details
- Born: Norman Wesley Sanderson Jr. July 7, 1951 (age 75) Lumberton, North Carolina, U.S.
- Party: Republican
- Spouse: Linda
- Occupation: Child care center owner
- Website: http://www.normansanderson.com

Norman Wesley Sanderson Jr. (born July 7, 1951) is a Republican member of the North Carolina General Assembly, representing the state's second Senate district, which includes Carteret, Craven, and Pamlico counties. Sanderson formerly represented the state's 3rd House district, which included parts of Craven and Pamlico counties.

== Political career ==
=== LGBTQ+ rights ===
In 2021, he proposed anti-transgender legislation which would prohibit medical professionals from performing gender confirmation surgery on those under the age of 21. The legislation would also mandate that state employees inform parents when their children display "gender nonconformity."

=== DWI incident ===
On October 19, 2025, Sanderson was arrested and charged with a DWI, with a reported BAC level of 0.16. He later described the incident a "regrettable mistake."

== Electoral history ==
=== 2006 ===
In 2006, Sanderson challenged incumbent Republican Jean Preston in the primary for the North Carolina Senate District 2 seat. Preston defeated Sanderson, 79.34%–20.66%.

North Carolina Senate District 2 Primary Election 2006
Party	Candidate	Votes	%
Republican	Jean Preston	6,558	79.34
Republican	Norman Sanderson	1,708	20.66
Total votes		8,266	100.00

=== 2008 ===
Sanderson next decided to challenge incumbent Democrat Alice Graham Underhill for the NC House District 3 seat. Neither faced any primary that year. Underhill narrowly beat Sanderson, 49.92%–47.65%.

North Carolina House District 3 General Election 2008
Party	Candidate	Votes	%
Democratic	Alice Graham Underhill	16,943	49.92
Republican	Norman Sanderson	16,173	47.65
Libertarian	Herb Sobel	825	2.43
Total votes		22,956	100.00

=== 2010 ===
Sanderson faced a rematch with Alice Graham Underhill and Libertarian challenger Herb Sobel in 2010. This time, Sanderson won the seat by a large margin 63.69%–34.24%–2.08%.

North Carolina House District 3 General Election 2010
Party	Candidate	Votes	%
Republican	Norman Sanderson	14,620	63.69
Democratic	Alice Graham Underhill	7,859	34.24
Libertarian	Herb Sobel	477	2.08
Total votes		22,956	100.00

=== 2012 ===
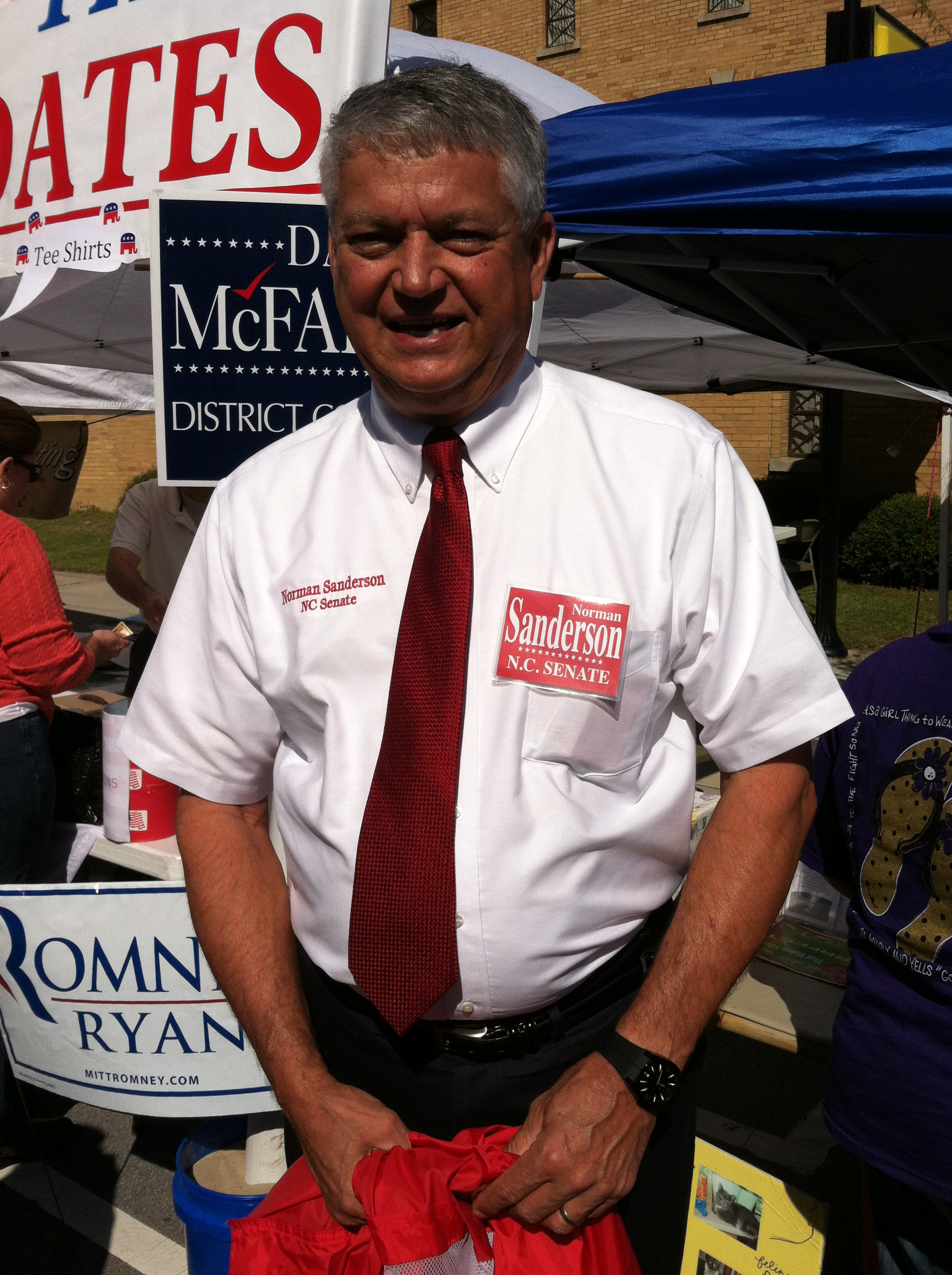
Sanderson at the 2012 MumFest in New Bern, NC

When incumbent Republican Jean Preston announced that she would not seek re-election to the NC Senate District 2 seat, Sanderson announced that he would run for the position. In the primary, he faced Randy Ramsey, a businessman from Beaufort, and Ken Jones, who is mayor of Pine Knoll Shores. Sanderson won the primary with 51.86% of the vote. He goes on to face Democrat Greg Muse in the general election.

North Carolina Senate District 2 Primary Election 2012
Party	Candidate	Votes	%
Republican	Norman Sanderson	11,057	51.86
Republican	Randy Ramsey	6,819	31.98
Republican	Ken Jones	3,446	16.16
Total votes		21,322	100.00

North Carolina House of Representatives
Preceded by Alice Graham Underhill	Member of the North Carolina House of Representatives from the 3rd district 2011–2013	Succeeded by Michael Speciale
North Carolina Senate
Preceded by Jean Preston	Member of the North Carolina Senate from the 2nd district 2013–2023	Succeeded by Jim Perry
Preceded by Bobby Hanig	Member of the North Carolina Senate from the 1st district 2023–2025	Succeeded by Bobby Hanig
Preceded by Bob Brinson	Member of the North Carolina Senate from the 2nd district 2025–Present	Incumbent
