= Charlie Miller (North Carolina politician) =

American politician

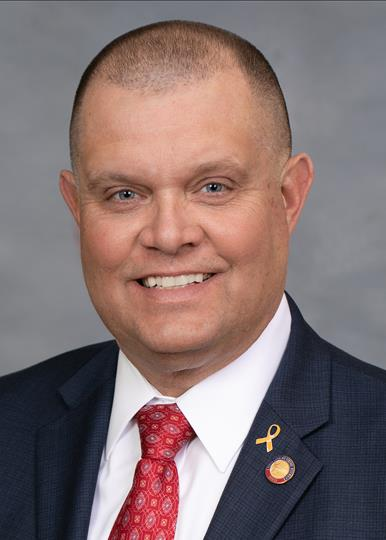

Member of the North Carolina House of Representatives from the 19th district
- Incumbent
- Assumed office January 1, 2021
- Preceded by: Constituency established

Personal details
- Born: Charles William Miller
- Party: Republican
- Spouse: Patty
- Occupation: Sheriff
- Website: www.ncleg.gov/Members/Biography/H/778

Charles William "Charlie" Miller is a Republican member of the North Carolina House of Representatives who has represented the 19th district (including parts of Brunswick and New Hanover counties) since 2021. Miller previously served on there Brunswick County School board. Miller was elected to the North Carolina House in 2020 after legislative mid-decade redistricting created a new district.

== Electoral history ==
North Carolina House of Representatives 19th district Republican Primary election, 2020
Party	Candidate	Votes	%
Republican	Charlie Miller	6,460	62.43%
Republican	David A. Perry	3,888	37.57%
Total votes		10,348	100%

North Carolina House of Representatives 19th district general election, 2020
Party	Candidate	Votes	%
Republican	Charlie Miller	34,259	57.96%
Democratic	Marcia Morgan	24,845	42.04%
Total votes		59,104	100%
Republican hold			

== Committee assignments ==
=== 2021–2022 session ===
- Appropriations
- Appropriations - Education
- Education - K-12
- Energy and Public Utilities (Vice Chair)
- Judiciary 3 (Vice Chair)
- Transportation

North Carolina House of Representatives
Preceded by Ted Davis Jr.	Member of the North Carolina House of Representatives from the 19th District; 2021–present	Incumbent
