= Erica D. Smith =

American politician in North Carolina

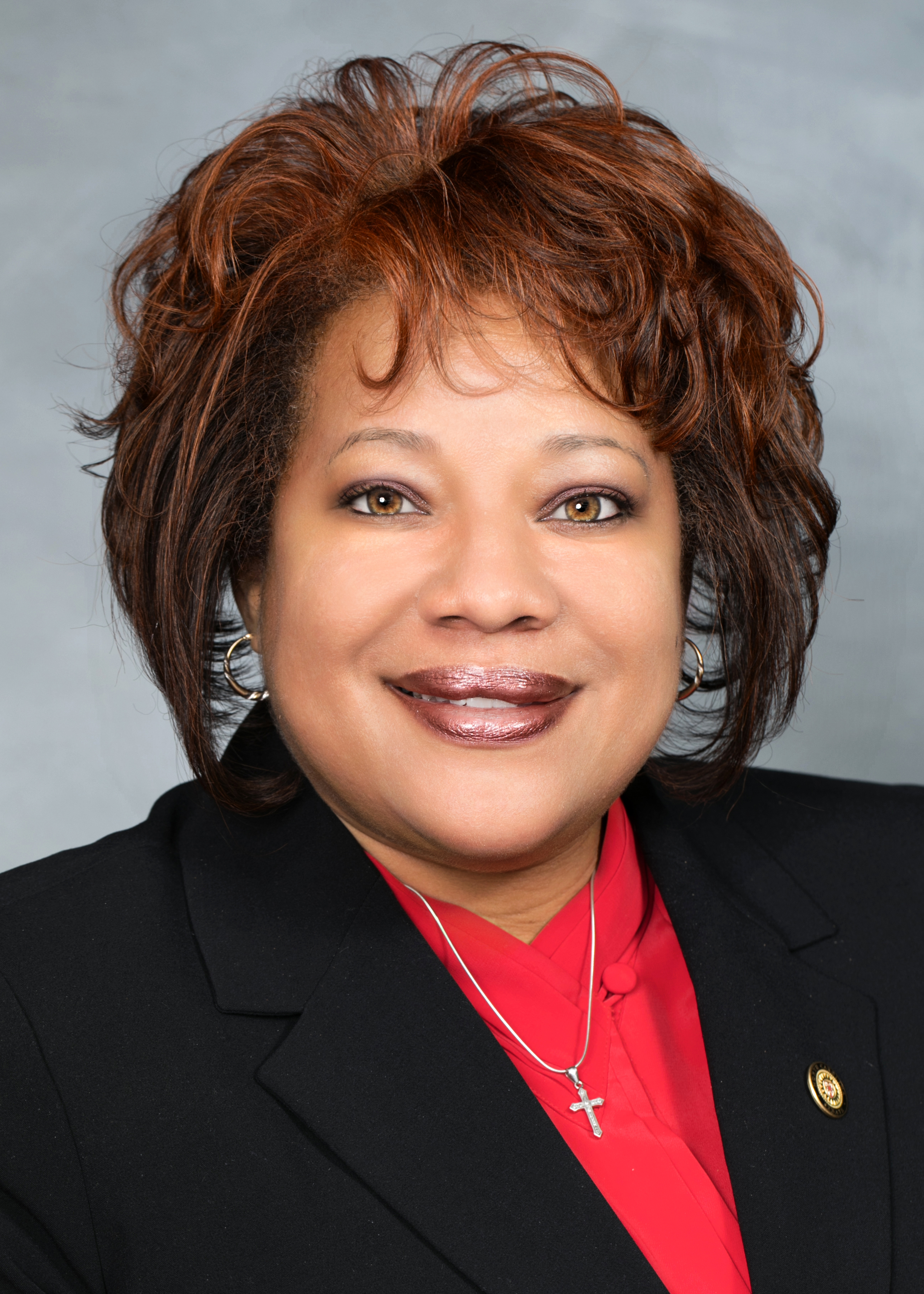

Member of the North Carolina Senate from the 3rd district
- In office January 1, 2015 – January 1, 2021
- Preceded by: Clark Jenkins
- Succeeded by: Ernestine Bazemore

Personal details
- Born: Erica Danette Smith; November 24, 1969 (age 56) Fort Bragg, North Carolina, U.S.
- Party: Democratic
- Spouse(s): Maud Ingram (Divorced); Kirkland Hicks (Divorced)
- Education: North Carolina A&T State University (BS); Howard University (MA)

Erica Danette Smith (born November 24, 1969) is an American engineer and politician who represented District 3 in the North Carolina Senate from 2015 to 2021. She was a candidate for the Democratic nomination for the U.S. Senate in 2020. She finished second in the Democratic primaries on March 3, 2020. She was a candidate for the Democratic nomination for the U.S. Senate in 2022, but she switched to the race for North Carolina's 1st congressional district after Rep. G. K. Butterfield announced that he would not run for another term.

== Early life and education ==
A native of Fayetteville, North Carolina, Smith graduated from high school at the North Carolina School of Science and Math in Durham. Smith holds a bachelor's degree in mechanical engineering from North Carolina A&T State University, and a master's degree in religious studies from Howard University. Smith began her career as a senior engineering specialist for Boeing Prior to her retirement from the engineering field, she also served as a patent examiner in the Chemical Engineering Technology Center of the U.S. Patent and Trademark Office.

== Political career ==
=== North Carolina Senate ===
A Democrat who was first elected to the North Carolina Senate in 2014, Smith represented Senate District 3 from 2015 to 2021. Senate District 3 includes Beaufort, Bertie, Martin, Northampton, Vance, and Warren Counties. Smith was re-elected without opposition in 2016 and defeated Republican Chuck Early in 2018. Smith co-chaired the Joint Legislative Women's Caucus, and served as Chair and Second Vice-Chair of the N.C. Legislative Black Caucus, Co-Chair of the Joint Legislative Tech Caucus, Democratic Women's Caucus, Chair of the Senate Democratic Caucus Rural Working Group, and the NCLBC Agriculture Working Group. Smith served for six years on the Northampton County Board of Education 2008–2014 and in grassroots organizing and community leadership as Democratic Party Chair and First Vice-Chair for Northampton County from 2001 to 2015.

In 2020, Smith published a complaint alleging harassment from other North Carolina state senators. She did not press charges, but argued for a change to the culture of the NC Senate to stop harassment.

=== 2020 United States Senate race ===
Smith began mapping out her path to the United States Senate at a Congressional Black Caucus "boot camp" Political Training Institute in 2005. She briefly put her plans on hold in 2012 following the death of her 5-year-old son.

==== Entering the race ====
In January 2019, Smith announced her candidacy for the United States Senate seat held by Thom Tillis. Smith, who currently works as a math instructional specialist, has likened her platform to a six-point lesson plan. During her primary contest, a Republican group, created just a few weeks earlier in 2020 and funded entirely by a Mitch McConnell-created conduit called "Faith and Power", spent $2.95 million to run ads supporting Smith, the content of which she found objectionable. Her campaign said it, "....disavows and disassociates ourselves from the interference of Republicans in the Democratic Senate Primary". "This entity is not authorized to represent our views and positions." Cal Cunningham, her major opponent, to whom she eventually finished second said, "Washington Republicans know Senator Tillis is weak, and apparently they don't like his chances against me in November. Now they're resorting to shady tactics to meddle in our election and it's disrespectful to North Carolina voters." The Tillis campaign denied foreknowledge of the ad buy, claiming it, "...couldn't be the least bit concerned with which radical liberal emerges from the chaos that is the Democratic primary". Cunningham lost a very close general election race to Tillis who received 48.7% of the vote to Cunningham's 46.9%.

=== 2022 United States Senate race ===
Smith was a candidate in the Democratic primary for the 2022 U.S. Senate election in North Carolina. She says her campaign will not accept donations from the fossil fuel industry or large corporate PACs.

=== 2022 United States House of Representatives race ===
On November 23, 2021, Smith withdrew from the Senate race and announced her campaign for the redrawn North Carolina's 1st congressional district, aiming to replace retiring U.S. representative G. K. Butterfield. On May 17, 2022, Don Davis won the Democratic primary, defeating Smith, who came in second, and two other candidates.

== Other work ==
Smith is a curriculum and instructional specialist for Haliwa-Saponi Tribal School in Hollister, North Carolina. She was formerly associate pastor at a missionary Baptist church.

North Carolina Senate
Preceded by Clark Jenkins	Member from the 3rd district 2015–2021	Succeeded by Ernestine Bazemore
