= Michael A. Gorman =

American politician from North Carolina

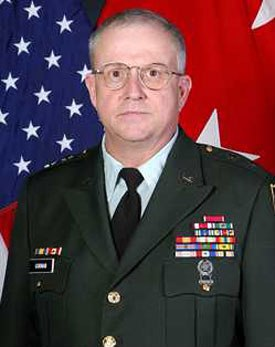

Member of the North Carolina House of Representatives from the 3rd district
- In office January 1, 2003 – January 1, 2005
- Preceded by: Alice Graham Underhill
- Succeeded by: Alice Graham Underhill

Personal details
- Born: July 9, 1950
- Died: December 2, 2012 (aged 62)
- Party: Republican

Michael A. Gorman (July 9, 1950 – December 2, 2012) was a Republican member of the North Carolina General Assembly representing the state's third House district, including constituents in Craven and Pamlico counties, from 2003 to 2004.

Gorman was born in New Jersey, graduated from the United States Naval Academy, served in the United States Navy with service during Vietnam War and retired as Lieutenant Commander after 24 years of service.

Gorman operated a business in Morehead City and then in Trent Woods, North Carolina. He lost a primary challenge in 2004, and lost another primary in 2006. He also served as mayor of Trent Woods.

He died of POEMS syndrome in 2012.

== Notes ==
North Carolina House of Representatives
Preceded by Alice Graham Underhill	Member of the North Carolina House of Representatives from the 3rd district 2003–2005	Succeeded by Alice Graham Underhill
