= Jim Perry (politician) =

American politician

Senator Jim Perry
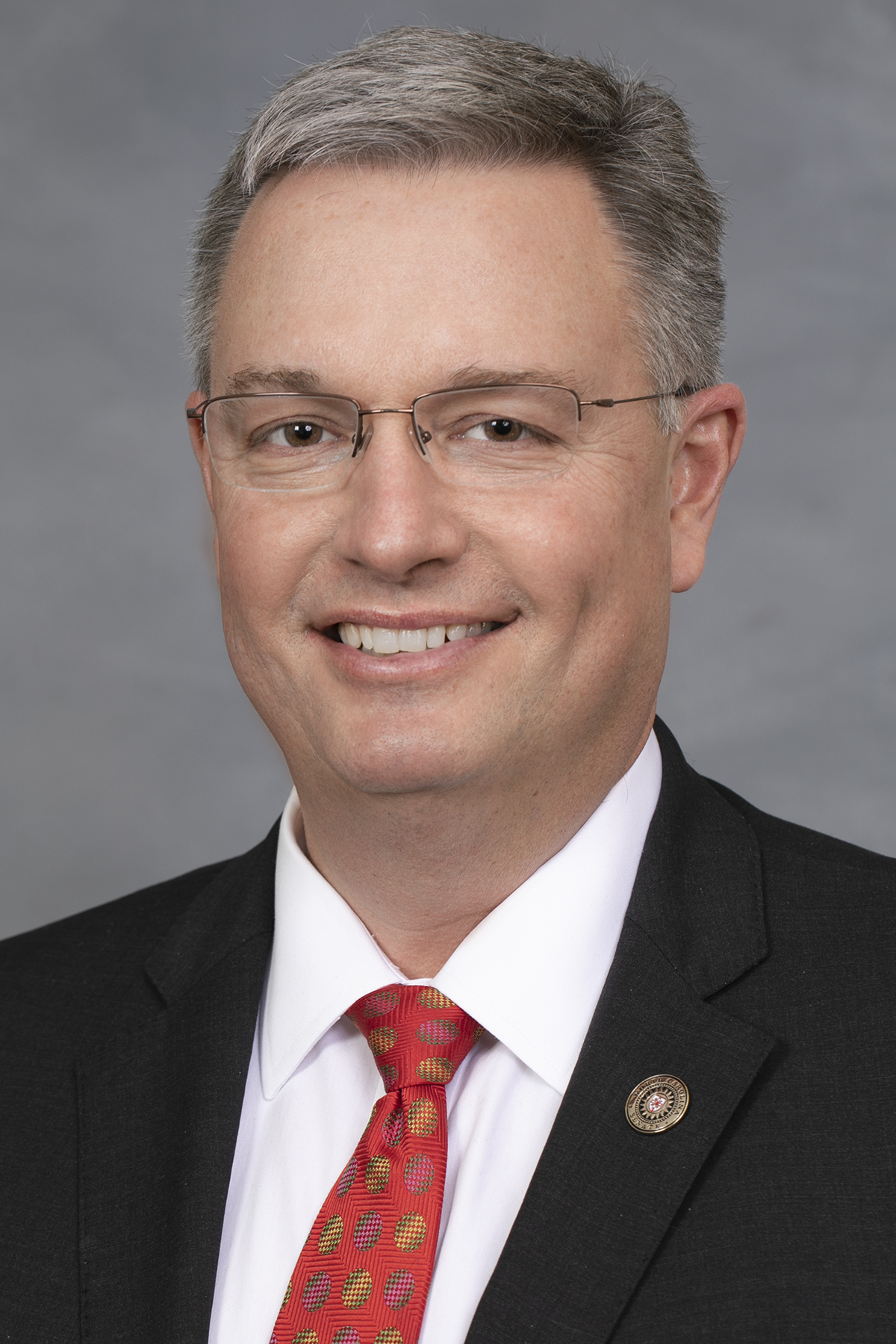

Member of the North Carolina Senate
- In office January 31, 2019 – July 2, 2024
- Preceded by: Louis Pate
- Succeeded by: Bob Brinson
- Constituency: 7th District (2019–2023); 2nd District (2023–2024)

Personal details
- Born: 1971 or 1972 (age 54–55) Lenoir County, North Carolina, U.S.
- Party: Republican
- Spouse: Rebecca Perry
- Education: North Carolina State University; University of North Carolina at Chapel Hill
- Occupation: Businessman / Private Investor

James Perry (born c. 1972) is a Republican politician who was a member of the North Carolina State Senate, representing the 7th district. He was appointed to the state Senate on January 31, 2019 by Governor Roy Cooper, to replace Louis Pate, who resigned for health reasons. He was chosen as Majority Whip for the 2021-2022 Biennium. Perry was challenged in the 2020 Republican Primary. He won the primary with 66% of the vote and won 86% of the vote in his home county of Lenoir. At the general election he defeated his opponent by 11 points.

== Career ==
Perry served as co-chairman of the powerful Senate finance committee, as well as being elected in Senate Leadership as majority Whip. During his tenure, Perry also served as Chairman of the following Committees: Health Care, Appropriations on Health and Human Services, Joint Committee on Unemployment Insurance. Perry developed a reputation as being an affable, cordial lawmaker who could get along with members, regardless of their party or chamber.

He served as a committee member on the Rules and Operations of the Senate, Commerce and Insurance, Pensions and Retirement and Aging, and State and Local Government Committees. In 2023, Perry sponsored a notable bill to loosen gun restrictions in the state. SB41 removed the requirement for pistol permits, and in limited cases allow concealed carry at religious institutions located on school property.

Perry is known to be a champion for flood resiliency measures. Perry previously served as Chairman of the Senate’s Select Committee on Storm Related River Debris and Damage in North Carolina. Perry said data supported using nature based solutions and pushed for consideration of our natural topography, riparian buffers and fluid mechanics.

Perry’s leadership efforts and research into the areas of nature based solutions have previously been recognized by the National Flood Coalition, the North Carolina Wildlife Federation, the Pew Charitable Trusts, the North Carolina Coastal Federation and the Eastern North Carolina Recovery and Resilience Alliance.

Perry announced he would not run for re-election in December 2023, citing family health issues and inability to offer to time commitment another term would require. He cited similar reasons when he resigned on July 2, 2024. In a July 15, 2024, interview Perry shared that his 22-year-old daughter's left leg was amputated in January 2024 after a 7-year fight with bone tumors. While discussing the difficulties his daughter and family faced, Perry indicated he would register to lobby and donate his services to raise awareness for amputees. He also stated his daughter planned to advocate for amputees.

== Electoral history ==
=== 2022 ===
North Carolina Senate 2nd district general election, 2022
Party	Candidate	Votes	%
Republican	Jim Perry (incumbent)	53,067	100%
Total votes		53,067	100%
Republican hold			

=== 2020 ===
North Carolina Senate 7th district general election, 2020
Party	Candidate	Votes	%
Republican	Jim Perry (incumbent)	45,364	55.25%
Democratic	Donna Lake	36,737	44.75%
Total votes		82,101	100%
Republican hold			

North Carolina Senate
Preceded by Louis Pate	Member of the North Carolina Senate from the 7th district 2019–2023	Succeeded by Michael Lee
Preceded by Norman Sanderson	Member of the North Carolina Senate from the 2nd district 2023–2024	Succeeded by Bob Brinson
