= Clark Jenkins =

American politician

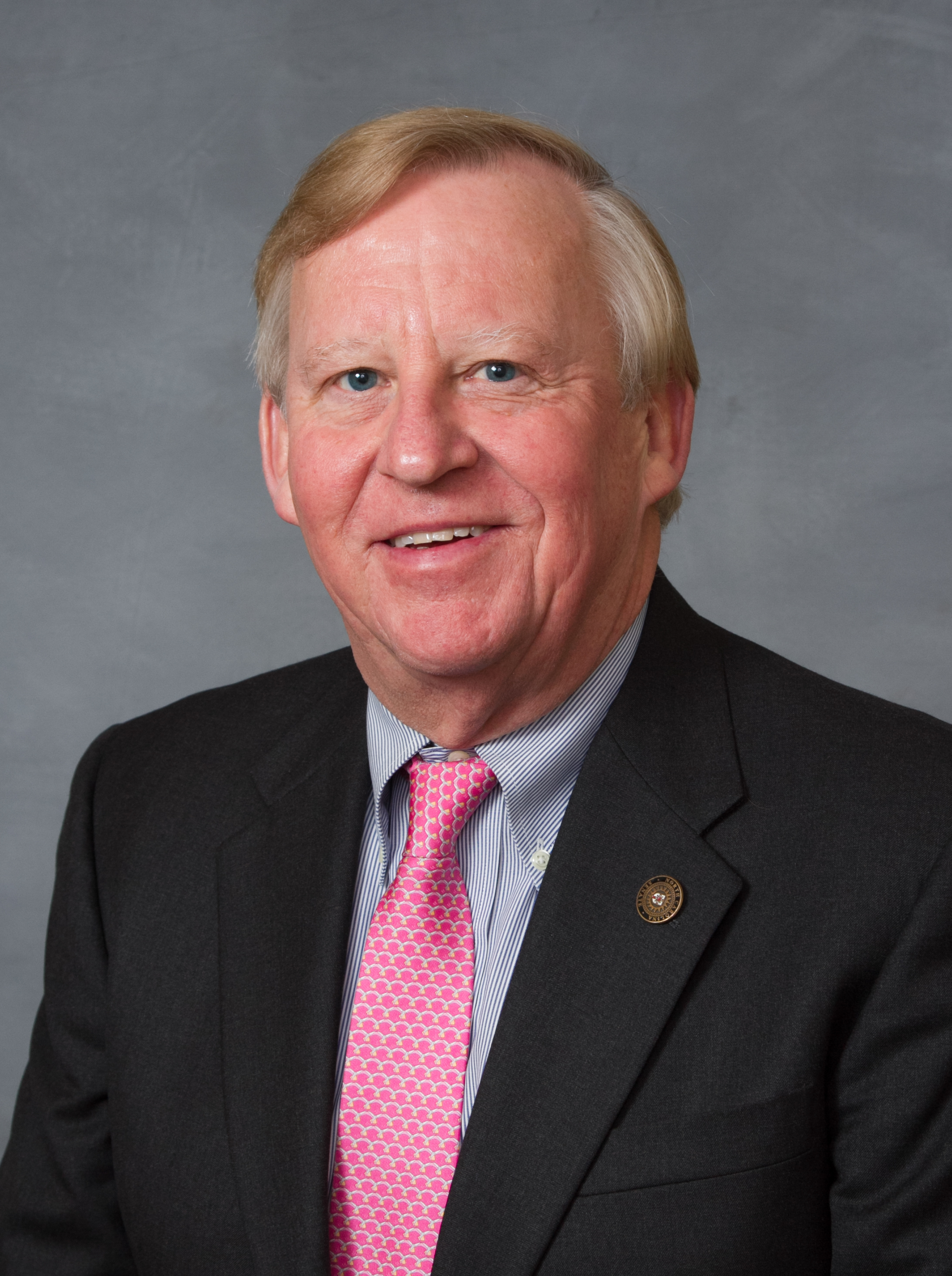

Member of the North Carolina Senate from the 3rd district
- In office January 1, 2003 – January 1, 2015
- Preceded by: Ed Warren; Bob Martin (Redistricting)
- Succeeded by: Erica Smith

Personal details
- Born: Samuel Clark Jenkins; April 28, 1948 (age 78)
- Party: Democratic
- Education: Campbell University (BA)
- Occupation: farmer

Samuel Clark Jenkins is an American politician who served as a Democratic member of the North Carolina General Assembly representing the state's third Senate district from 2003 to 2015. His district included constituents in Edgecombe, Martin, and Pitt counties. Jenkins is a farmer from Tarboro, North Carolina. Jenkins served six terms and was Deputy Minority Leader of the NC Senate.

North Carolina Senate
Preceded by Scott Thomas	Member of the North Carolina Senate from the 3rd district 2003–2015	Succeeded by Erica Smith
