= North Carolina's 19th House district =

American legislative district

North Carolina's 19th State House of Representatives district
Representative
Charlie Miller; R–Southport
- Demographics: 88% White; 3% Black; 4% Hispanic; 1% Asian; 4% Multiracial
- Population (2024): 95,103

North Carolina's 19th House district is one of 120 districts in the North Carolina House of Representatives. It has been represented by Republican Charlie Miller since 2021.

== Geography ==
Since 2021, the district has included parts of New Hanover and Brunswick counties. The district overlaps with the 7th and 8th Senate districts.

== District officeholders ==
=== Multi-member district ===
Representative	Party	Dates	Notes	Representative	Party	Dates	Notes	Representative	Party	Dates	Notes	Representative	Party	Dates	Notes	Counties
District created January 1, 1967.
Howard Twiggs (Raleigh)	Democratic	January 1, 1967 – January 1, 1973	Redistricted to the 15th district.	Samuel Johnson (Raleigh)	Democratic	January 1, 1967 – January 1, 1973	Redistricted from the Wake County district. Redistricted to the 15th district.	Archie McMillan (Raleigh)	Democratic	January 1, 1967 – January 1, 1971	Redistricted from the Wake County district.	Thomas Bunn (Raleigh)	Democratic	January 1, 1967 – January 1, 1969	Redistricted from the Wake County district.	1967–1973; All of Wake County.
Howard Twiggs (Raleigh)	Democratic	January 1, 1967 – January 1, 1973	Redistricted to the 15th district.	Samuel Johnson (Raleigh)	Democratic	January 1, 1967 – January 1, 1973	Redistricted from the Wake County district. Redistricted to the 15th district.	Archie McMillan (Raleigh)	Democratic	January 1, 1967 – January 1, 1971	Redistricted from the Wake County district.	H. W. "Pop" Taylor (Raleigh)	Democratic	January 1, 1969 – January 1, 1971		1967–1973; All of Wake County.
Howard Twiggs (Raleigh)	Democratic	January 1, 1967 – January 1, 1973	Redistricted to the 15th district.	Samuel Johnson (Raleigh)	Democratic	January 1, 1967 – January 1, 1973	Redistricted from the Wake County district. Redistricted to the 15th district.	Robert Farmer (Raleigh)	Democratic	January 1, 1971 – January 1, 1973	Redistricted to the 15th district.	Robert Wynne (Raleigh)	Democratic	January 1, 1971 – January 1, 1973	Redistricted to the 15th district.	1967–1973; All of Wake County.
R. C. Soles Jr. (Tabor City)	Democratic	January 1, 1973 – January 1, 1977	Redistricted from the 13th district. Retired to run for State Senate.	Jimmy Green (Clarkton)	Democratic	January 1, 1973 – January 1, 1977	Redistricted from the 12th district.	C. Graham Tart (Clinton)	Democratic	January 1, 1973 – January 1, 1975	Redistricted from the 12th district.					1973–1983; All of Columbus, Bladen, and Sampson counties.
R. C. Soles Jr. (Tabor City)	Democratic	January 1, 1973 – January 1, 1977	Redistricted from the 13th district. Retired to run for State Senate.	Jimmy Green (Clarkton)	Democratic	January 1, 1973 – January 1, 1977	Redistricted from the 12th district.	Richard Wright (Tabor City)	Democratic	January 1, 1975 – January 1, 1983	Redistricted to the 15th district.					1973–1983; All of Columbus, Bladen, and Sampson counties.
Edd Nye (Elizabethtown)	Democratic	January 1, 1977 – January 1, 1983		Ron Taylor (Elizabethtown)	Democratic	January 1, 1977 – January 1, 1983		Richard Wright (Tabor City)	Democratic	January 1, 1975 – January 1, 1983	Redistricted to the 15th district.					1973–1983; All of Columbus, Bladen, and Sampson counties.
Bob Etheridge (Lillington)	Democratic	January 1, 1983 – January 1, 1989	Redistricted from the 18th district. Retired to run for Superintendent of Public Instruction.	Dennis Wicker (Sanford)	Democratic	January 1, 1983 – January 1, 1993	Redistricted from the 18th district. Retired to run for Lieutenant Governor.									1983–1993; All of Harnett and Lee counties.
Clarence Stewart (Sanford)	Democratic	January 1, 1989 – January 1, 1995		Dennis Wicker (Sanford)	Democratic	January 1, 1983 – January 1, 1993	Redistricted from the 18th district. Retired to run for Lieutenant Governor.									1983–1993; All of Harnett and Lee counties.
Clarence Stewart (Sanford)	Democratic	January 1, 1989 – January 1, 1995		Bobby Ray Hall (Sanford)	Democratic	January 1, 1993 – January 1, 1995										1993–2003; All of Harnett and Lee counties. Part of Sampson County.
Don Davis (Erwin)	Republican	January 1, 1995 – January 1, 2003	Redistricted to the 53rd district and retired.	Willis Brown (Buies Creek)	Democratic	January 1, 1995 – January 1, 1997										1993–2003; All of Harnett and Lee counties. Part of Sampson County.
Don Davis (Erwin)	Republican	January 1, 1995 – January 1, 2003	Redistricted to the 53rd district and retired.	Bobby Ray Hall (Sanford)	Republican	January 1, 1997 – January 1, 1999										1993–2003; All of Harnett and Lee counties. Part of Sampson County.
Don Davis (Erwin)	Republican	January 1, 1995 – January 1, 2003	Redistricted to the 53rd district and retired.	Leslie Cox (Sanford)	Democratic	January 1, 1999 – January 1, 2003	Redistricted to the 51st district and lost re-election.									1993–2003; All of Harnett and Lee counties. Part of Sampson County.

=== Single-member district ===
Representative	Party	Dates	Notes	Counties
Danny McComas (Wilmington)	Republican	January 1, 2003 – September 2, 2012	Redistricted from the 13th district. Resigned.	2003–2021; Part of New Hanover County.
Vacant		September 2, 2012 – September 26, 2012		2003–2021; Part of New Hanover County.
Ted Davis Jr. (Wilmington)	Republican	September 26, 2012 – January 1, 2021	Appointed to finish McComas' term. Redistricted to the 20th district.	2003–2021; Part of New Hanover County.
Charlie Miller (Southport)	Republican	January 1, 2021 – Present		2021–Present; Parts of New Hanover and Brunswick counties.

== Election results ==
=== 2024 ===
North Carolina House of Representatives 19th district general election, 2024
Party	Candidate	Votes	%
Republican	Charlie Miller (incumbent)	41,266	61.46%
Democratic	Jill Brown	25,882	38.54%
Total votes		67,148	100%
Republican hold			

=== 2022 ===
North Carolina House of Representatives 19th district general election, 2022
Party	Candidate	Votes	%
Republican	Charlie Miller (incumbent)	33,131	100%
Total votes		33,131	100%
Republican hold			

=== 2020 ===
North Carolina House of Representatives 19th district Democratic primary election, 2020
Party	Candidate	Votes	%
Democratic	Marcia Morgan	9,588	82.04%
Democratic	James Dawkins Jr.	2,099	17.96%
Total votes		11,687	100%

North Carolina House of Representatives 19th district Republican Primary election, 2020
Party	Candidate	Votes	%
Republican	Charlie Miller	6,460	62.43%
Republican	David A. Perry	3,888	37.57%
Total votes		10,348	100%

North Carolina House of Representatives 19th district general election, 2020
Party	Candidate	Votes	%
Republican	Charlie Miller	34,259	57.96%
Democratic	Marcia Morgan	24,845	42.04%
Total votes		59,104	100%
Republican hold			

=== 2018 ===
North Carolina House of Representatives 19th district Republican primary election, 2018
Party	Candidate	Votes	%
Republican	Ted Davis Jr. (incumbent)	1,705	67.58%
Republican	Hunter Ford	818	32.42%
Total votes		2,523	100%

North Carolina House of Representatives 19th district general election, 2018
Party	Candidate	Votes	%
Republican	Ted Davis Jr. (incumbent)	17,957	49.30%
Democratic	Marcia Morgan	17,075	46.88%
Libertarian	David Perry	1,389	3.81%
Total votes		36,421	100%
Republican hold			

=== 2016 ===
North Carolina House of Representatives 19th district general election, 2016
Party	Candidate	Votes	%
Republican	Ted Davis Jr. (incumbent)	31,133	100%
Total votes		31,133	100%
Republican hold			

=== 2014 ===
North Carolina House of Representatives 19th district general election, 2014
Party	Candidate	Votes	%
Republican	Ted Davis Jr. (incumbent)	18,467	100%
Total votes		18,467	100%
Republican hold			

=== 2012 ===
North Carolina House of Representatives 19th district Republican primary election, 2012
Party	Candidate	Votes	%
Republican	Ted Davis Jr.	5,175	67.29%
Republican	Dean Lambeth	2,516	32.71%
Total votes		7,691	100%

North Carolina House of Representatives 19th district general election, 2012
Party	Candidate	Votes	%
Republican	Ted Davis Jr. (incumbent)	22,958	60.27%
Democratic	Emilie Swearingen	15,131	39.73%
Total votes		38,089	100%
Republican hold			

=== 2010 ===
North Carolina House of Representatives 19th district general election, 2010
Party	Candidate	Votes	%
Republican	Danny McComas (incumbent)	22,407	100%
Total votes		22,407	100%
Republican hold			

=== 2008 ===
North Carolina House of Representatives 19th district general election, 2008
Party	Candidate	Votes	%
Republican	Danny McComas (incumbent)	31,354	100%
Total votes		31,354	100%
Republican hold			

=== 2006 ===
North Carolina House of Representatives 19th district general election, 2006
Party	Candidate	Votes	%
Republican	Danny McComas (incumbent)	14,850	100%
Total votes		14,850	100%
Republican hold			

=== 2004 ===
North Carolina House of Representatives 19th district general election, 2004
Party	Candidate	Votes	%
Republican	Danny McComas (incumbent)	27,954	100%
Total votes		27,954	100%
Republican hold			

=== 2002 ===
North Carolina House of Representatives 19th district general election, 2002
Party	Candidate	Votes	%
Republican	Danny McComas (incumbent)	20,083	88.67%
Libertarian	Ty Jacobus	2,565	11.33%
Total votes		22,648	100%
Republican hold			

=== 2000 ===
North Carolina House of Representatives 19th district general election, 2000
Party	Candidate	Votes	%
Democratic	Leslie Cox (incumbent)	21,359	27.54%
Republican	Don Davis (incumbent)	20,817	26.84%
Republican	Bobby Ray Hall	18,077	23.31%
Democratic	Larry C. Upchurch	17,310	22.32%
Total votes		77,563	100%
Democratic hold			
Republican hold			
