= Pat McElraft =

American politician (born 1947)

Representative Pat McElraft
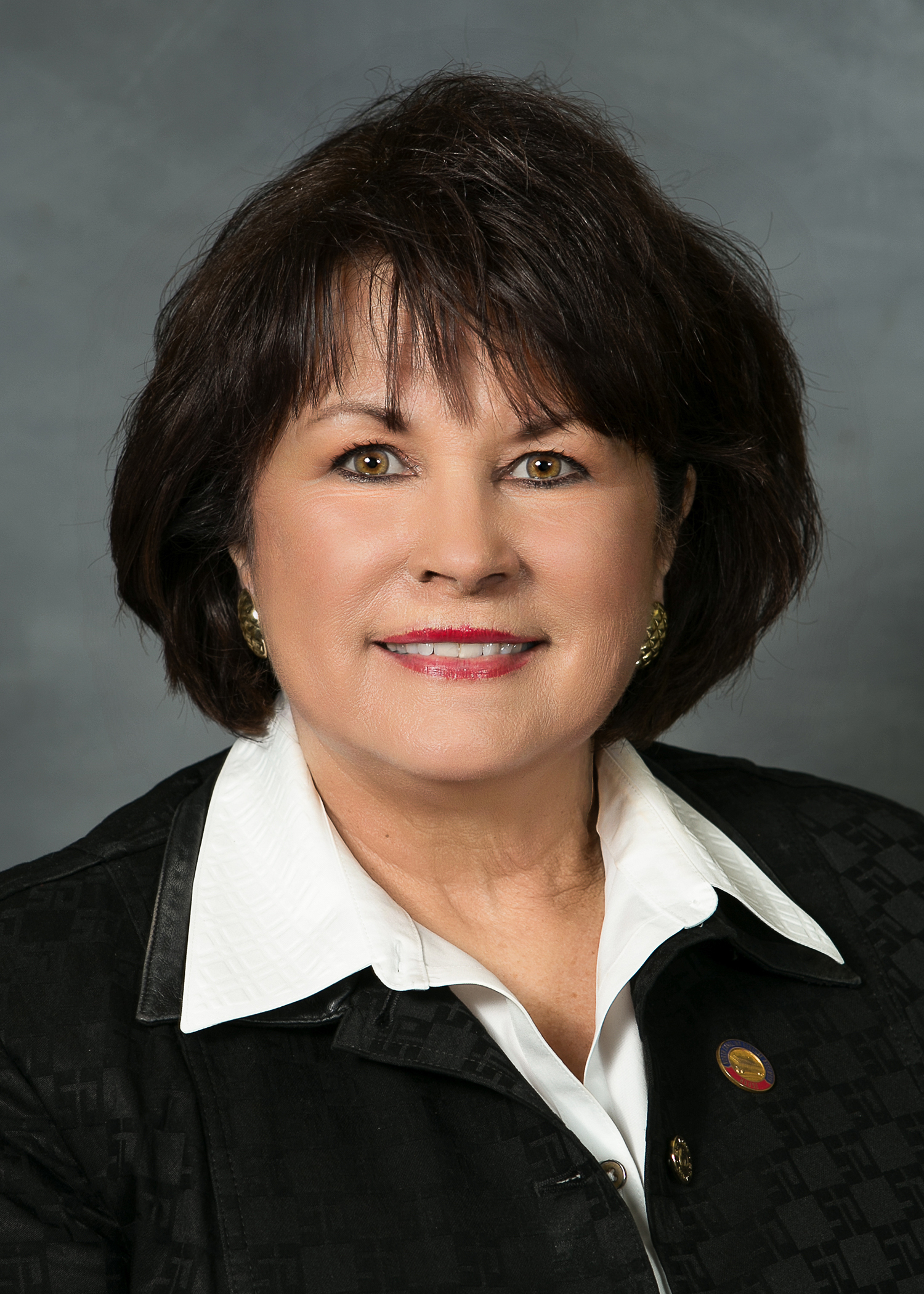

Member of the North Carolina House of Representatives from the 13th district
- In office January 1, 2007 – January 1, 2023
- Preceded by: Jean Preston
- Succeeded by: Celeste Cairns

Personal details
- Born: March 20, 1947 (age 79) Hugo, Oklahoma, U.S.
- Party: Republican
- Spouse: Roger
- Children: 2
- Website: patforhouse.com

Patricia Earlene McElraft (born March 20, 1947) is a former Republican member of the North Carolina House of Representatives. She represented the 13th district (including all of Carteret and Jones counties) from 2007 to 2023. She is currently one of the Deputy Majority Whips. McElraft announced in December 2021 that she would not run for reelection in 2022.

McElraft and her husband, retired Colonel Roger McElraft, live in Emerald Isle, North Carolina and have two grown children. She was a technical sales representative for Microbiology Product Company. Previously, she served 3 terms as an Emerald Isle Town Commissioner and a partial term as Carteret County Commissioner before being elected to the State House.

== Political positions ==
During the 2011-2012 session, McElraft was chairman of the Environment committee and Vice-Chairman of the Insurance committee. McElraft drafted House Bill 819 (S.L. 2012-201), which prevented local and state agencies from incorporating recent scientific estimates of projected sea level rise due to climate change in planning efforts, making it easier to expand development in low coastal areas.

== Electoral history ==
=== 2020 ===
North Carolina House of Representatives 13th district general election, 2020
| Party | Candidate | Votes | % |
|---|---|---|---|
| Republican | Pat McElraft (incumbent) | 33,477 | 71.65% |
| Democratic | Buck Bayliff | 13,246 | 28.35% |
| Total votes | | 46,723 | 100% |
| Republican hold | | | |

=== 2018 ===
North Carolina House of Representatives 13th district Republican primary election, 2018
| Party | Candidate | Votes | % |
|---|---|---|---|
| Republican | Pat McElraft (incumbent) | 5,746 | 75.52% |
| Republican | Blake Beadle | 1,863 | 24.48% |
| Total votes | | 7,609 | 100% |

North Carolina House of Representatives 13th district general election, 2018
| Party | Candidate | Votes | % |
|---|---|---|---|
| Republican | Pat McElraft (incumbent) | 22,755 | 72.76% |
| Unaffliated | Pene diMaio | 8,518 | 27.24% |
| Total votes | | 31,273 | 100% |
| Republican hold | | | |

=== 2016 ===
North Carolina House of Representatives 13th district general election, 2016
| Party | Candidate | Votes | % |
|---|---|---|---|
| Republican | Pat McElraft (incumbent) | 29,188 | 70.82% |
| Democratic | Rodney Alexander | 12,024 | 29.18% |
| Total votes | | 41,212 | 100% |
| Republican hold | | | |

=== 2014 ===
North Carolina House of Representatives 13th district general election, 2014
| Party | Candidate | Votes | % |
|---|---|---|---|
| Republican | Pat McElraft (incumbent) | 19,946 | 69.73% |
| Democratic | Jim Nolan | 8,659 | 30.27% |
| Total votes | | 28,605 | 100% |
| Republican hold | | | |

=== 2012 ===
In 2012, McElraft did not face any primary opponents. She faced a rematch with Wyatt Rike (now a Libertarian candidate) in the general election. McElraft easily won re-election with nearly 90% of the vote.

North Carolina House of Representatives 13th district general election, 2012
| Party | Candidate | Votes | % |
|---|---|---|---|
| Republican | Pat McElraft (incumbent) | 28,416 | 88.34% |
| Libertarian | Wyatt Rike | 3,752 | 11.66% |
| Total votes | | 32,168 | 100% |
| Republican hold | | | |

=== 2010 ===
In 2010, McElraft faced a primary challenge from Morehead City resident Wyatt Rike. She defeated Rike 77%–22% and went on to defeat the Democratic candidate, environmental scientist and teacher Craig Hassler (also of Morehead City), with 73% of the vote.

North Carolina House of Representatives 13th district Republican primary election, 2010
| Party | Candidate | Votes | % |
|---|---|---|---|
| Republican | Pat McElraft (incumbent) | 4,354 | 77.43% |
| Republican | Wyatt Rike | 1,269 | 22.57% |
| Total votes | | 5,623 | 100% |

North Carolina House of Representatives 13th district general election, 2010
| Party | Candidate | Votes | % |
|---|---|---|---|
| Republican | Pat McElraft (incumbent) | 19,491 | 73.26% |
| Democratic | Craig K. Hassler | 7,113 | 26.74% |
| Total votes | | 26,604 | 100% |
| Republican hold | | | |

=== 2008 ===
In 2008, McElraft did not face any primary opponents, continuing on to the general election to face the Democratic party candidate Barbara Garrity-Blake. Garrity-Blake, a doctorate anthropologist from Down East and former commissioner on the North Carolina Marine Fisheries Commission, also did not face any primary challenge. McElraft defeated Garrity-Blake 57%–43%.

North Carolina House of Representatives 13th district general election, 2008
| Party | Candidate | Votes | % |
|---|---|---|---|
| Republican | Pat McElraft (incumbent) | 22,022 | 56.85% |
| Democratic | Barbara Garrity-Blake | 16,714 | 43.15% |
| Total votes | | 38,736 | 100% |
| Republican hold | | | |

=== 2006 ===
After serving several years as both a town and county commissioner, McElraft ran, in 2006, for the North Carolina House of Representatives district 13 seat held by Jean R. Preston who decided to run for state Senate. McElraft defeated Dave Fowler in the Republican primary 68%–32%. In the general election, McElraft faced Democratic veteran politician Malcolm Fulcher who had previously served in the state House in the late 1970s to early 1980s. McElraft won the seat 58%–42%.

North Carolina House of Representatives 13th district Republican primary election, 2006
| Party | Candidate | Votes | % |
|---|---|---|---|
| Republican | Pat McElraft | 4,491 | 68.06% |
| Republican | Dave Fowler | 2,108 | 31.94% |
| Total votes | | 6,599 | 100% |

North Carolina House of Representatives 13th district general election, 2006
| Party | Candidate | Votes | % |
|---|---|---|---|
| Republican | Pat McElraft | 14,304 | 58.37% |
| Democratic | G. Malcolm Fulcher, Jr. | 10,201 | 41.63% |
| Total votes | | 24,505 | 100% |
| Republican hold | | | |

== Committee assignments ==
=== 2021-2022 session ===
- Appropriations (Vice Chair)
- Appropriations - Agriculture and Natural and Economic Resources (Chair)
- Environment (Chair)
- Health
- Insurance
- Judiciary I
- Regulatory Reform

=== 2019-2020 session ===
- Appropriations (Vice Chair)
- Appropriations - Agriculture and Natural and Economic Resources (Chair)
- Environment (Chair)
- Insurance
- Regulatory Reform
- State and Local Government

=== 2017-2018 session ===
- Appropriations (Vice Chair)
- Appropriations - Agriculture and Natural and Economic Resources (Chair)
- Environment (Chair)
- Insurance
- Regulatory Reform
- State Personnel
- Ethics
- Health Care Reform

=== 2015-2016 session ===
- Appropriations (Vice Chair)
- Appropriations - Agriculture and Natural and Economic Resources
- Appropriations - Information Technology
- Commerce and Job Development
- Environment (Chair)
- Insurance
- Regulatory Reform
- State Personnel
- Ethics

=== 2013-2014 session ===
- Appropriations (Vice Chair)
- Environment (Chair)
- Insurance (Vice Chair)
- Regulatory Reform
- Transportation

=== 2011-2012 session ===
- Appropriations
- Environment (Chair)
- Insurance (Vice Chair)
- Education
- Transportation

=== 2009-2010 session ===
- Appropriations
- Environment and Natural Resources
- Local Government II
- Education
- Juvenile Justice
- Marine Resources and Aquaculture

North Carolina House of Representatives
| Preceded by Jean Preston | Member of the North Carolina House of Representatives from the 13th district 2007–2023 | Succeeded by Celeste Cairns |
