= Alice Graham Underhill =

American politician

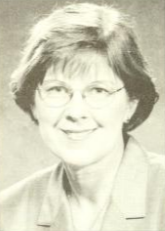
- Underhill in the 2001 legislative manual

Member of the North Carolina House of Representatives from the 3rd district
- In office January 1, 2005 – January 1, 2011
- Preceded by: Michael Gorman
- Succeeded by: Norman Sanderson
- In office January 1, 2001 – January 1, 2003
- Preceded by: Scott Thomas
- Succeeded by: Michael Gorman

Personal details
- Born: March 8, 1946 (age 80) Raleigh, North Carolina
- Party: Democratic
- Profession: Librarian

Alice Graham Underhill (born March 8, 1946) was a Democratic member of the North Carolina General Assembly, representing the state's third House district from 2001 to 2003 and again from 2005 until 2011. She was defeated for re-election in 2010 by Norman W. Sanderson.

North Carolina House of Representatives
Preceded by Scott Thomas	Member of the North Carolina House of Representatives from the 3rd district 2001–2003	Succeeded by Michael Gorman
Preceded by Michael Gorman	Member of the North Carolina House of Representatives from the 3rd district 2005–2011	Succeeded by Norman Sanderson
