= Jean R. Preston =

American politician from North Carolina

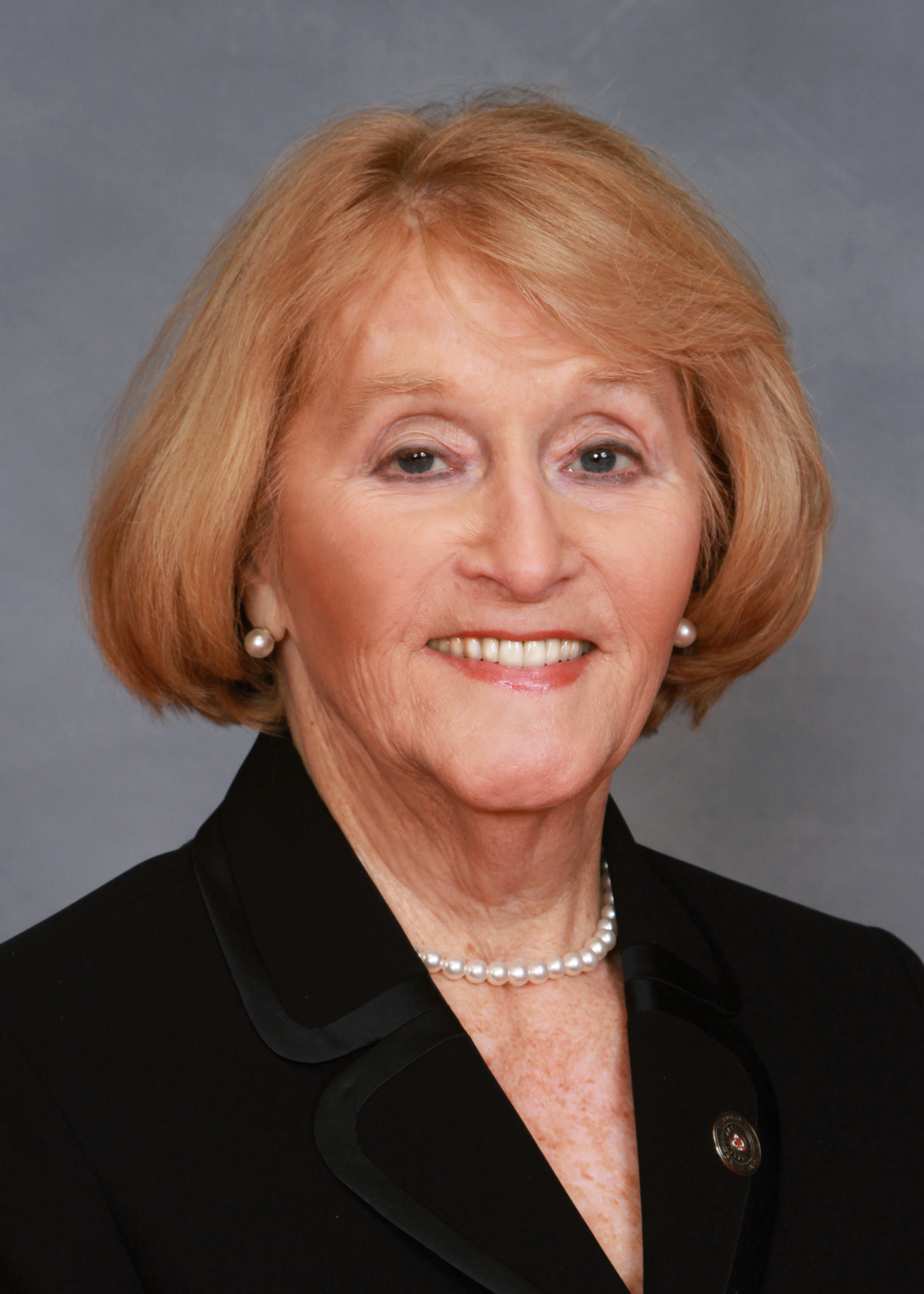

Member of the North Carolina Senate from the 2nd district
- In office January 1, 2007 – January 1, 2013
- Preceded by: C. W. "Pete" Bland
- Succeeded by: Norman Sanderson

Member of the North Carolina House of Representatives
- In office January 1, 1993 – January 1, 2007
- Preceded by: Bruce Etheridge
- Succeeded by: Pat McElraft
- Constituency: 4th District (1993-2003); 13th District (2003-2007)

Personal details
- Born: May 25, 1935 Snow Hill, North Carolina, U.S.
- Died: January 10, 2013 (aged 77) Waterbury, Connecticut, U.S.
- Party: Republican
- Education: East Carolina University
- Profession: Retired, educator

Jean Rouse Preston (May 25, 1935 – January 10, 2013) served for 20 years in the North Carolina General Assembly, including seven terms in the North Carolina House of Representatives and three in the North Carolina Senate. She retired in 2012 when she was the Joint Republican Caucus Leader and Senator representing the state's second district, including constituents in Carteret county. She also served as co-chair of the Education/Higher Education and the Appropriations Education/Higher Education Committees. She was a retired educator from Emerald Isle, North Carolina. Preston died in 2013 at age 77.

== Early life and education ==
Preston was born on May 25, 1935, in Snow Hill, North Carolina. Her parents were Marvin Wayne Rouse and the former Emma Mae Kearney. She graduated from Snow Hill High School in 1953 and then attended Flora MacDonald College for a couple of years before graduating with a B.S. degree and in Business Education from East Carolina University in 1957. She later returned to ECU to receive her M.A. in Education in 1973.

== Honors ==
Jean R. Preston Memorial Park in Emerald Isle, North Carolina

North Carolina Senate
Preceded by C. W. "Pete" Bland	Member of the North Carolina Senate from the 2nd district 2007-2013	Succeeded by Norman Sanderson
North Carolina House of Representatives
Preceded by Danny McComas	Member of the North Carolina House of Representatives from the 13th district 2003-2007	Succeeded by Pat McElraft
Preceded by Bruce Etheridge	Member of the North Carolina House of Representatives from the 4th district 1993-2003	Succeeded by Charles Elliott Johnson
