= North Carolina's 3rd Senate district =

American legislative district

North Carolina's 3rd State Senate district
Senator
Bob Brinson; R–New Bern
- Demographics: 49% White; 41% Black; 4% Hispanic; 1% Asian; 1% Native American; 4% Multiracial
- Population (2023): 198,097

North Carolina's 3rd Senate district is one of 50 districts in the North Carolina Senate. It has been represented by Republican Bob Brinson since 2025.

== Geography ==
Since 2023, the district has included all of Lenoir, Craven, and Beaufort counties. The district overlaps with the 3rd, 12th, 13th, and 79th house districts.

== District officeholders since 1973 ==
Senator	Party	Dates	Notes	Counties
William Mills (Maysville)	Democratic	January 1, 1973 – January 1, 1977	Redistricted from the 6th district.	1973–1983; All of Onslow County.
Jerry Popkin (Jacksonville)	Democratic	January 1, 1977 – January 1, 1979		1973–1983; All of Onslow County.
William Mills (Maysville)	Democratic	January 1, 1979 – January 1, 1983		1973–1983; All of Onslow County.
Joseph Thomas (Vanceboro)	Democratic	January 1, 1983 – January 1, 1987	Redistricted from the 2nd district.	1983–1993; All of Carteret, Craven, and Pamlico counties.
Bill Barker (Oriental)	Democratic	January 1, 1987 – January 1, 1991	Retired.	1983–1993; All of Carteret, Craven, and Pamlico counties.
Bev Perdue (New Bern)	Democratic	January 1, 1991 – January 1, 2001	Retired to run for Lieutenant Governor.	1983–1993; All of Carteret, Craven, and Pamlico counties.
Bev Perdue (New Bern)	Democratic	January 1, 1991 – January 1, 2001	Retired to run for Lieutenant Governor.	1993–2003; All of Craven and Pamlico counties. Part of Carteret County.
Scott Thomas (New Bern)	Democratic	January 1, 2001 – January 1, 2003	Redistricted to the 2nd district.	1993–2003; All of Craven and Pamlico counties. Part of Carteret County.
Clark Jenkins (Tarboro)	Democratic	January 1, 2003 – January 1, 2015	Lost re-nomination.	2003–2005; All of Edgecombe, Martin, Bertie, Washington, and Tyrrell counties. Part of Pitt County.
Clark Jenkins (Tarboro)	Democratic	January 1, 2003 – January 1, 2015	Lost re-nomination.	2005–2013; All of Edgecombe and Martin counties. Part of Pitt County.
Clark Jenkins (Tarboro)	Democratic	January 1, 2003 – January 1, 2015	Lost re-nomination.	2013–2019; All of Northampton, Hertford, Bertie, Chowan, Edgecombe, Martin, and Tyrrell counties.
Erica Smith (Gaston)	Democratic	January 1, 2015 – January 1, 2021	Retired to run for U.S Senator.	2013–2019; All of Northampton, Hertford, Bertie, Chowan, Edgecombe, Martin, and Tyrrell counties.
Erica Smith (Gaston)	Democratic	January 1, 2015 – January 1, 2021	Retired to run for U.S Senator.	2019–2023; All of Vance, Warren, Northampton, Bertie, Martin, and Beaufort counties.
Ernestine Bazemore (Aulander)	Democratic	January 1, 2021 – January 1, 2023	Lost re-nomination.	2019–2023; All of Vance, Warren, Northampton, Bertie, Martin, and Beaufort counties.
Bobby Hanig (Powells Point)	Republican	January 1, 2023 – January 1, 2025	Redistricted from the 1st district. Redistricted to the 1st district.	2023–2025; All of Warren, Northampton, Halifax, Martin, Bertie, Hertford, Gates, Camden, Currituck, and Tyrrell counties.
Bob Brinson (New Bern)	Republican	January 1, 2025 – Present	Redistricted from the 2nd district.	2025–Present; All of Lenoir, Craven, and Beaufort counties.

== Election results ==
=== 2024 ===
North Carolina Senate 3rd district Republican primary election, 2024
Party	Candidate	Votes	%
Republican	Bob Brinson	13,211	54.41%
Republican	Michael Speciale	11,069	45.59%
Total votes		24,280	100%

North Carolina Senate 3rd district general election, 2024
Party	Candidate	Votes	%
Republican	Bob Brinson (incumbent)	64,025	59.99%
Democratic	Charles Dudley	42,704	40.01%
Total votes		106,729	100%
Republican hold			

=== 2022 ===
North Carolina Senate 3rd district Democratic primary election, 2022
Party	Candidate	Votes	%
Democratic	Valerie Jordan	13,644	59.65%
Democratic	Ernestine Bazemore (incumbent)	9,229	40.35%
Total votes		22,873	100%

North Carolina Senate 3rd district general election, 2022
Party	Candidate	Votes	%
Republican	Bobby Hanig (incumbent)	37,984	52.53%
Democratic	Valerie Jordan	34,320	47.47%
Total votes		72,304	100%
Republican hold			

=== 2020 ===
North Carolina Senate 3rd district general election, 2020
Party	Candidate	Votes	%
Democratic	Ernestine Bazemore	45,507	52.03%
Republican	Thomas S. Hester Jr.	41,959	47.97%
Total votes		87,466	100%
Democratic hold			

=== 2018 ===
North Carolina Senate 3rd district general election, 2018
Party	Candidate	Votes	%
Democratic	Erica Smith (incumbent)	33,942	53.86%
Republican	C. "Chuck" Earley Jr.	29,082	46.14%
Total votes		63,024	100%
Democratic hold			

=== 2016 ===
North Carolina Senate 3rd district general election, 2016
Party	Candidate	Votes	%
Democratic	Erica Smith (incumbent)	57,507	100%
Total votes		57,507	100%
Democratic hold			

=== 2014 ===
North Carolina Senate 3rd district Democratic primary election, 2014
Party	Candidate	Votes	%
Democratic	Erica Smith	10,557	48.34%
Democratic	Clark Jenkins (incumbent)	8,730	39.97%
Democratic	Alan Mizelle	2,552	11.69%
Total votes		21,839	100%

North Carolina Senate 3rd district general election, 2014
Party	Candidate	Votes	%
Democratic	Erica Smith	39,635	100%
Total votes		39,635	100%
Democratic hold			

=== 2012 ===
North Carolina Senate 3rd district Democratic primary election, 2012
Party	Candidate	Votes	%
Democratic	Clark Jenkins (incumbent)	19,694	67.46%
Democratic	Florence Arnold Armstrong	9,500	32.54%
Total votes		29,194	100%

North Carolina Senate 3rd district general election, 2012
Party	Candidate	Votes	%
Democratic	Clark Jenkins (incumbent)	65,851	100%
Total votes		65,851`	100%
Democratic hold			

=== 2010 ===
North Carolina Senate 3rd district Democratic primary election, 2010
Party	Candidate	Votes	%
Democratic	Clark Jenkins (incumbent)	9,313	49.73%
Democratic	Frankie L. Bordeaux	7,119	38.01%
Democratic	Florence Arnold Armstrong	2,295	12.26%
Total votes		18,727	100%

North Carolina Senate 3rd district Republican primary election, 2010
Party	Candidate	Votes	%
Republican	C. B. Daughtridge	1,707	76.31%
Republican	Henry Williams	530	23.69%
Total votes		2,237	100%

North Carolina Senate 3rd district general election, 2010
Party	Candidate	Votes	%
Democratic	Clark Jenkins (incumbent)	27,586	62.72%
Republican	C. B. Daughtridge	16,399	37.28%
Total votes		43,985	100%
Democratic hold			

=== 2008 ===
North Carolina Senate 3rd district Democratic primary election, 2008
Party	Candidate	Votes	%
Democratic	Clark Jenkins (incumbent)	16,187	50.52%
Democratic	Shelly Willingham	13,200	41.20%
Democratic	Henry Williams II	2,652	8.28%
Total votes		32,039	100%

North Carolina Senate 3rd district general election, 2008
Party	Candidate	Votes	%
Democratic	Clark Jenkins (incumbent)	57,703	100%
Total votes		57,703	100%
Democratic hold			

=== 2006 ===
North Carolina Senate 3rd district Democratic primary election, 2006
Party	Candidate	Votes	%
Democratic	Clark Jenkins (incumbent)	7,969	64.28%
Democratic	Shelly Willingham	4,429	35.72%
Total votes		12,398	100%

North Carolina Senate 3rd district general election, 2006
Party	Candidate	Votes	%
Democratic	Clark Jenkins (incumbent)	19,633	100%
Total votes		19,633	100%
Democratic hold			

=== 2004 ===
North Carolina Senate 3rd district Democratic primary election, 2004
Party	Candidate	Votes	%
Democratic	Clark Jenkins (incumbent)	5,044	33.13%
Democratic	Shelly Willingham	4,991	32.79%
Democratic	Charles Elliott Johnson	4,011	26.35%
Democratic	Jim Rouse	1,177	7.73%
Total votes		15,223	100%

North Carolina Senate 3rd district Democratic primary run-off election, 2004
Party	Candidate	Votes	%
Democratic	Clark Jenkins (incumbent)	6,070	54.47%
Democratic	Shelly Willingham	5,074	45.53%
Total votes		11,144	100%

North Carolina Senate 3rd district general election, 2004
Party	Candidate	Votes	%
Democratic	Clark Jenkins (incumbent)	36,343	66.04%
Republican	Beverly Moore	18,686	33.96%
Total votes		55,029	100%
Democratic hold			

=== 2002 ===
North Carolina Senate 3rd district Democratic primary election, 2002
Party	Candidate	Votes	%
Democratic	Clark Jenkins	10,687	45.30%
Democratic	Patricia Ferguson	9,757	41.36%
Democratic	Ann M. Slocumb	1,626	6.89%
Democratic	Henry Williams II	1,523	6.46%
Total votes		23,593	100%

North Carolina Senate 3rd district general election, 2002
Party	Candidate	Votes	%
Democratic	Clark Jenkins	26,444	66.69%
Republican	Don Carson	12,743	32.14%
Libertarian	Henry Boschen	464	1.17%
Total votes		39,651	100%
Democratic hold			

=== 2000 ===
North Carolina Senate 3rd district general election, 2000
Party	Candidate	Votes	%
Democratic	Scott Thomas	29,313	54.13%
Republican	David G. Hipps	24,836	45.87%
Total votes		54,149	100%
Democratic hold			
