= North Carolina's 2nd Senate district =

American legislative district

North Carolina's 2nd State Senate district
Senator
Norman Sanderson; R–Minnesott Beach
- Demographics: 60% White; 26% Black; 8% Hispanic; 2% Asian; 1% Other; 3% Multiracial
- Population (2023): 200,588

North Carolina's 2nd Senate district is one of 50 districts in the North Carolina Senate. It has been represented by Republican Norman Sanderson since 2025.

== Geography ==
Since 2025, the district has included all of Warren, Halifax, Martin, Chowan, Washington, Hyde, Pamlico, and Carteret counties. The district overlaps with the 1st, 13th, 23rd, 27th, and 79th state house districts.

== District officeholders since 1973 ==
Senator	Party	Dates	Notes	Counties
D. Livingstone Stallings (New Bern)	Democratic	January 1, 1973 – January 1, 1979		1973–1983; All of Carteret, Craven, and Pamlico counties.
Joseph Thomas (Vanceboro)	Democratic	January 1, 1979 – January 1, 1983	Redistricted to the 3rd district.	1973–1983; All of Carteret, Craven, and Pamlico counties.
J. J. Harrington (Lewiston Woodville)	Democratic	January 1, 1983 – January 1, 1989	Redistricted from the 1st district.	1983–1985; All of Northampton, Bertie, Hertford, Gates, and Chowan counties. Parts of Halifax, Edgecombe, Martin, and Washington counties.
J. J. Harrington (Lewiston Woodville)	Democratic	January 1, 1983 – January 1, 1989	Redistricted from the 1st district.	1985–1993; All of Northampton and Hertford counties. Parts of Warren, Halifax, Bertie, Martin, Edgecombe, and Gates counties.
Frank Ballance (Warrenton)	Democratic	January 1, 1989 – January 1, 2003	Redistricted to the 4th district and retired to run for Congress.	1985–1993; All of Northampton and Hertford counties. Parts of Warren, Halifax, Bertie, Martin, Edgecombe, and Gates counties.
Frank Ballance (Warrenton)	Democratic	January 1, 1989 – January 1, 2003	Redistricted to the 4th district and retired to run for Congress.	1993–2003; All of Warren, Northampton, Hertford, Gates counties. Parts of Vance, Halifax, and Bertie counties.
Scott Thomas (New Bern)	Democratic	January 1, 2003 – January 30, 2006	Redistricted from the 3rd district. Resigned to become District Attorney.	2003–2023; All of Carteret, Craven, and Pamlico counties.
Vacant		January 30, 2006 – February 1, 2006		2003–2023; All of Carteret, Craven, and Pamlico counties.
C.W. "Pete" Bland (Vanceboro)	Democratic	February 1, 2006 – January 1, 2007	Appointed to finish Thomas's term. Lost re-election.	2003–2023; All of Carteret, Craven, and Pamlico counties.
Jean Preston (Emerald Isle)	Republican	January 1, 2007 – January 1, 2013	Retired.	2003–2023; All of Carteret, Craven, and Pamlico counties.
Norman Sanderson (Minnesott Beach)	Republican	January 1, 2013 – January 1, 2023	Redistricted to the 1st district.	2003–2023; All of Carteret, Craven, and Pamlico counties.
Jim Perry (Kinston)	Republican	January 1, 2023 – July 2, 2024	Redistricted from the 7th district. Resigned.	2023–2025; All of Lenoir, Craven, and Beaufort counties.
Vacant		July 2, 2024 – July 30, 2024		2023–2025; All of Lenoir, Craven, and Beaufort counties.
Bob Brinson (New Bern)	Republican	July 30, 2024 – January 1, 2025	Appointed to finish Perry's term. Redistricted to the 3rd district.	2023–2025; All of Lenoir, Craven, and Beaufort counties.
Norman Sanderson (Minnesott Beach)	Republican	January 1, 2025 – Present	Redistricted from the 1st district.	2025–Present; All of Warren, Halifax, Martin, Chowan, Washington, Hyde, Pamlico, and Carteret counties.

== Election results ==
=== 2024 ===
North Carolina Senate 2nd district general election, 2024
Party	Candidate	Votes	%
Republican	Norman Sanderson (incumbent)	63,006	56.05%
Democratic	Tare Davis	47,001	41.81%
Libertarian	Maria Cormos	2,406	2.14%
Total votes		112,413	100%
Republican hold			

=== 2022 ===
North Carolina Senate 2nd district general election, 2022
Party	Candidate	Votes	%
Republican	Jim Perry (incumbent)	53,067	100%
Total votes		53,067	100%
Republican hold			

=== 2020 ===
North Carolina Senate 2nd district general election, 2020
Party	Candidate	Votes	%
Republican	Norman Sanderson (incumbent)	63,014	63.16%
Democratic	Libbie Griffin	32,870	32.95%
Libertarian	Tim Harris	3,884	3.89%
Total votes		99,768	100%
Republican hold			

=== 2018 ===
North Carolina Senate 2nd district Democratic primary election, 2018
Party	Candidate	Votes	%
Democratic	Ginger Garner	3,944	50.47%
Democratic	Dorothea D. White	3,871	49.53%
Total votes		7,815	100%

North Carolina Senate 2nd district Republican primary election, 2018
Party	Candidate	Votes	%
Republican	Norman Sanderson (incumbent)	11,293	76.29%
Republican	Lisa Oakley	3,510	23.71%
Total votes		14,803	100%

North Carolina Senate 2nd District general election, 2018
Party	Candidate	Votes	%
Republican	Norman Sanderson (incumbent)	42,898	61.78%
Democratic	Ginger Garner	24,644	35.49%
Libertarian	Tim Harris	1,894	2.73%
Total votes		69,436	100%
Republican hold			

=== 2016 ===
North Carolina Senate 2nd district general election, 2016
Party	Candidate	Votes	%
Republican	Norman Sanderson (incumbent)	58,032	66.29%
Democratic	Dorothea E. White	29,505	33.71%
Total votes		87,537	100%
Republican hold			

=== 2014 ===
North Carolina Senate 2nd district Democratic primary election, 2014
Party	Candidate	Votes	%
Democratic	Carroll G. (Carr) Ipock II	3,989	48.87%
Democratic	Dorothea E. White	2,751	33.70%
Democratic	Fernie J. Hymon	1,422	17.42%
Total votes		8,162	100%

North Carolina Senate 2nd district general election, 2014
Party	Candidate	Votes	%
Republican	Norman Sanderson (incumbent)	36,562	60.45%
Democratic	Carroll G. (Carr) Ipock II	23,925	39.55%
Total votes		60,487	100%
Republican hold			

=== 2012 ===
North Carolina Senate 2nd district Republican primary election, 2012
Party	Candidate	Votes	%
Republican	Norman Sanderson	11,057	51.86%
Republican	Randy Ramsey	6,819	31.98%
Republican	Ken Jones	3,446	16.16%
Total votes		21,322	100%

North Carolina Senate 2nd district general election, 2012
Party	Candidate	Votes	%
Republican	Norman Sanderson	53,873	63.12%
Democratic	Greg Muse	31,479	36.88%
Total votes		85,352	100%
Republican hold			

=== 2010 ===
North Carolina Senate 2nd district general election, 2010
Party	Candidate	Votes	%
Republican	Jean Preston (incumbent)	36,390	65.72%
Democratic	Barbara Garrity-Blake	18,982	34.28%
Total votes		55,372	100%
Republican hold			

=== 2008 ===
North Carolina Senate 2nd district general election, 2008
Party	Candidate	Votes	%
Republican	Jean Preston (incumbent)	51,117	61.61%
Democratic	Greg D. Muse	31,849	38.39%
Total votes		82,966	100%
Republican hold			

=== 2006 ===
North Carolina Senate 2nd district Republican primary election, 2006
Party	Candidate	Votes	%
Republican	Jean Preston	6,558	79.34%
Republican	Norman Sanderson	1,708	20.66%
Total votes		8,266	100%

North Carolina Senate 2nd district general election, 2006
Party	Candidate	Votes	%
Republican	Jean Preston	28,340	57.38%
Democratic	C.W. "Pete" Bland (incumbent)	21,052	42.62%
Total votes		49,392	100%
Republican gain from Democratic			

=== 2004 ===
North Carolina Senate 2nd district general election, 2004
Party	Candidate	Votes	%
Democratic	Scott Thomas (incumbent)	37,123	54.46%
Republican	Chuck Tyson	29,966	43.96%
Libertarian	Richard C. Evey	1,073	1.57%
Total votes		68,162	100%
Democratic hold			

=== 2002 ===
North Carolina Senate 2nd district Republican primary election, 2002
Party	Candidate	Votes	%
Republican	Chuck Tyson	5,951	56.67%
Republican	Jule D. Wheatly	4,551	43.33%
Total votes		10,502	100%

North Carolina Senate 2nd district general election, 2002
Party	Candidate	Votes	%
Democratic	Scott Thomas (incumbent)	26,011	51.69%
Republican	Chuck Tyson	24,310	48.31%
Total votes		50,321	100%
Democratic hold			

=== 2000 ===
North Carolina Senate 2nd district general election, 2000
Party	Candidate	Votes	%
Democratic	Frank Ballance (incumbent)	35,977	100%
Total votes		35,977	100%
Democratic hold			
