= Michael Speciale =

American politician

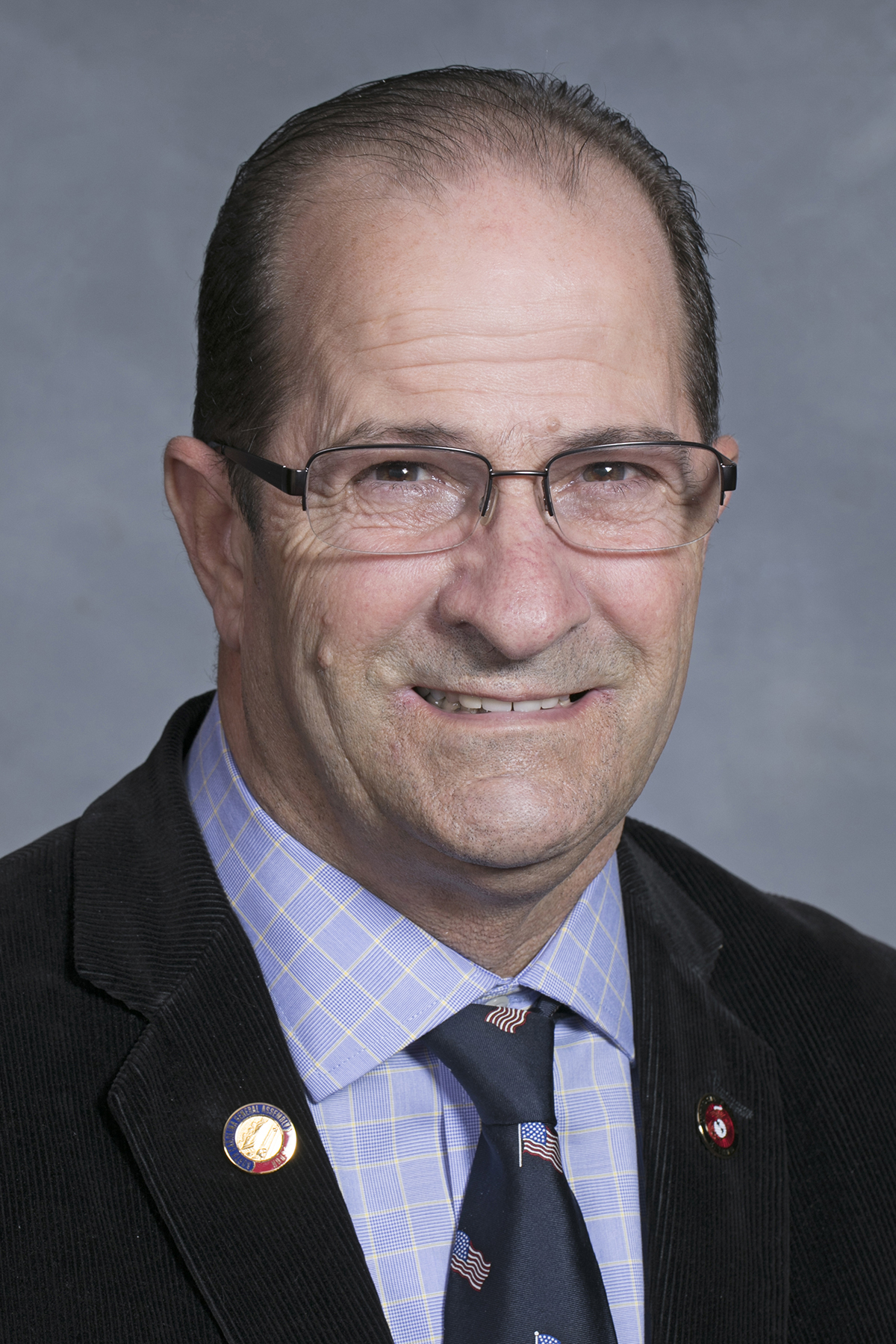

Member of the North Carolina House of Representatives from the 3rd district
- In office January 1, 2013 – January 1, 2021
- Preceded by: Norman Sanderson
- Succeeded by: Steve Tyson

Personal details
- Born: Michael David Speciale; December 9, 1955 (age 70) Chicago, Illinois, U.S.
- Party: Republican
- Spouse: Hazel Bradley

Military service
- Allegiance: United States
- Branch/service: United States Marine Corps
- Years of service: 1973–1995

Michael David Speciale (born December 9, 1955) is an American Republican politician. He was a member of the North Carolina House of Representatives representing the 3rd District from 2013 until 2021. He was born in Chicago, Illinois, before moving to North Carolina as a Marine at the age of 18.

He represented Craven County.

During a debate for an Anti-Puppy Mill Bill, which was a central focus for the First Lady of North Carolina, Ann McCrory's legislative interests, to illustrate the issue of the lack of specificity that comes with over-regulation, Speciale stated: "Exercise on a daily basis – if I kick him across the floor, is that daily exercise? 'Euthanasia performed humanely' – so I should choose the ax or the baseball bat?"

In February 2017, Speciale joined with Representatives George Cleveland (R-Jacksonville), and Larry Pittman (R-Cabarrus) in proposing a constitutional amendment that would allow North Carolina voters to repeal Article I, Section 4 of the North Carolina Constitution. This article declares " "This State shall ever remain a member of the American Union; the people thereof are part of the American nation," and prohibits the state from seceding from the United States of America, and its inclusion in North Carolina's 1868 constitution was a condition for being readmitted into the Union after the Civil War.

In April 2017 Representative Speciale along with Representatives Larry Pittman and Carl Ford filed a bill in the N.C. General Assembly that says gay marriage is not valid in North Carolina. The bill, H.B. 780, claimed the U.S. Supreme Court ruling that allows gay marriage is not valid in North Carolina. The bill stated, "…the United States Supreme Court overstepped its constitutional bounds when it struck down Section 6 of Article XIV of the North Carolina Constitution in its Obergefell v. Hodges decision of 2015…" and also says that the Supreme Court ruling "…exceeds the authority of the Court relative to the decree of Almighty God that 'a man shall leave his father and his mother and hold fast to his wife, and they shall become one flesh' (Genesis 2:24, ESV) and abrogates the clear meaning and understanding of marriage in all societies throughout prior history…" Had the bill passed, marriages of the same gender performed outside North Carolina would also not recognized. House Speaker Tim Moore released a statement Wednesday on the Uphold Historical Marriage Act that said, "There are strong constitutional concerns with this legislation given that the U.S. Supreme Court has firmly ruled on the issue, therefore House Bill 780 will be referred to the House Rules Committee and will not be heard."

Speciale sponsored a bill in 2018 supporting arming teachers.

North Carolina House of Representatives
Preceded by Norman Sanderson	Member of the North Carolina House of Representatives from the 3rd district 2013–2021	Succeeded by Steve Tyson
