= 2014 North Carolina Senate election =

- November 4, 2014

All 50 seats in the North Carolina State Senate
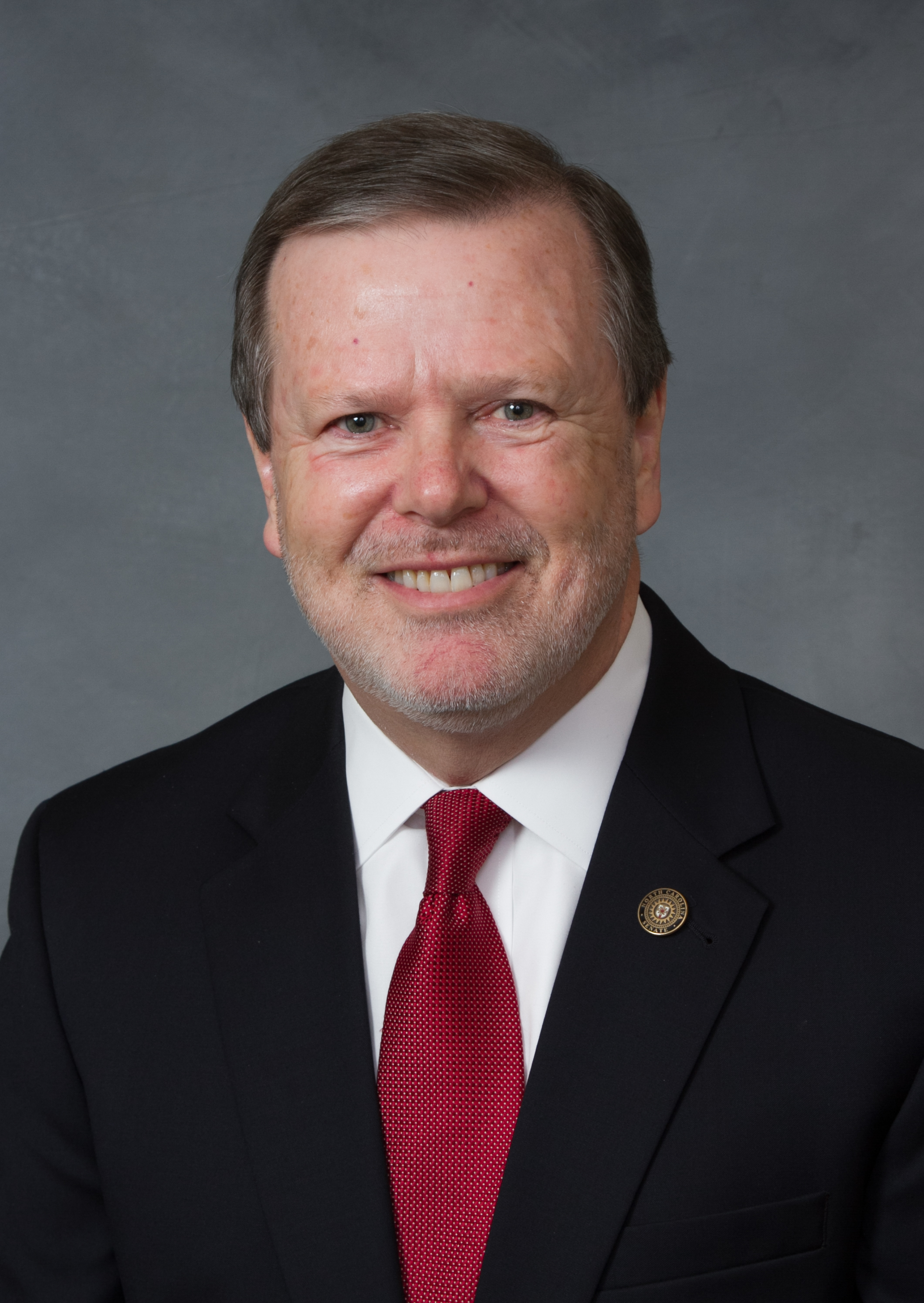

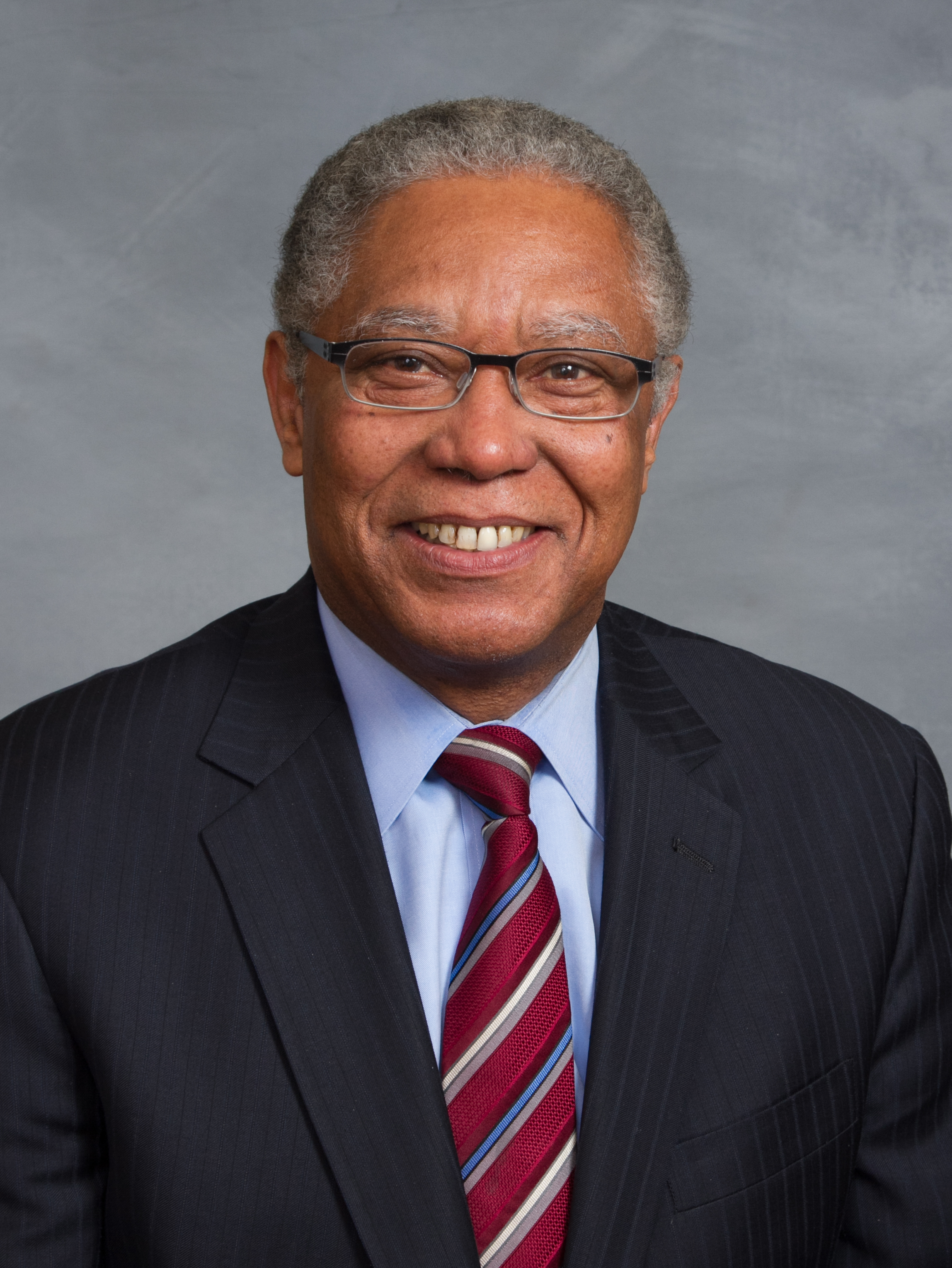
	Majority party	Minority party
Leader	Phil Berger	Dan Blue
Party	Republican	Democratic
Leader since	January 1, 2005	March 2, 2014
Leader's seat	26th – Eden	14th – Raleigh
Last election	33	17
Seats after	34	16
Seat change	▲1	▼1
- Results: Democratic hold Republican hold Republican gain
President pro tempore before election
Phil Berger
Republican
President pro tempore-designate
Phil Berger
Republican

The 2014 North Carolina Senate elections selected members to serve in the North Carolina Senate for a two-year term commencing in January 2015. Going into the election, the Senate had 33 Republican and 17 Democratic members, which constituted a two-thirds super-majority for the Republican Party. Following the election, the Senate had 34 Republican and 16 Democratic members.

== Predictions ==
Source	Ranking	As of
Governing	Likely R	October 20, 2014

== Results summary ==
District	Incumbent	Party	Elected	Party
1st	Bill Cook	Rep	Bill Cook	Rep
2nd	Norman W. Sanderson	Rep	Norman W. Sanderson	Rep
3rd	Clark Jenkins	Dem	Erica Smith	Dem
4th	Angela Bryant	Dem	Angela Bryant	Dem
5th	Don Davis	Dem	Don Davis	Dem
6th	Harry Brown	Rep	Harry Brown	Rep
7th	Louis M. Pate Jr.	Rep	Louis M. Pate Jr.	Rep
8th	Bill Rabon	Rep	Bill Rabon	Rep
9th	Michael Lee	Rep	Michael Lee	Rep
10th	Brent Jackson	Rep	Brent Jackson	Rep
11th	Buck Newton	Rep	Buck Newton	Rep
12th	Ronald Rabin	Rep	Ronald Rabin	Rep
13th	Michael Walters	Dem	Jane Smith	Dem
14th	Dan Blue	Dem	Dan Blue	Dem
15th	Neal Hunt†	Rep	John M. Alexander Jr.	Rep
16th	Josh Stein	Dem	Josh Stein	Dem
17th	Tamara P. Barringer	Rep	Tamara P. Barringer	Rep
18th	Chad Barefoot	Rep	Chad Barefoot	Rep
19th	Wesley Meredith	Rep	Wesley Meredith	Rep
20th	Floyd McKissick Jr.	Dem	Floyd McKissick Jr.	Dem
21st	Ben Clark	Dem	Ben Clark	Dem
22nd	Mike Woodard	Dem	Mike Woodard	Dem
23rd	Valerie Foushee	Dem	Valerie Foushee	Dem
24th	Rick Gunn	Rep	Rick Gunn	Rep
25th	Gene McLaurin	Dem	Tom McInnis	Rep
26th	Phil Berger	Rep	Phil Berger	Rep
27th	Trudy Wade	Rep	Trudy Wade	Rep
28th	Gladys A. Robinson	Dem	Gladys A. Robinson	Dem
29th	Jerry W. Tillman	Rep	Jerry W. Tillman	Rep
30th	Shirley B. Randleman	Rep	Shirley B. Randleman	Rep
31st	Joyce Krawiec	Rep	Joyce Krawiec	Rep
32nd	Earline Parmon	Dem	Earline Parmon	Dem
33rd	Stan Bingham	Rep	Stan Bingham	Rep
34th	Andrew C. Brock	Rep	Andrew C. Brock	Rep
35th	Tommy Tucker	Rep	Tommy Tucker	Rep
36th	Fletcher L. Hartsell Jr.	Rep	Fletcher L. Hartsell Jr.	Rep
37th	Jeff Jackson	Dem	Jeff Jackson	Dem
38th	Joel Ford	Dem	Joel Ford	Dem
39th	Bob Rucho	Rep	Bob Rucho	Rep
40th	Joyce Waddell	Dem	Joyce Waddell	Dem
41st	Jeff Tarte	Rep	Jeff Tarte	Rep
42nd	Austin M. Allran†	Rep	Andy Wells	Rep
43rd	Kathy Harrington	Rep	Kathy Harrington	Rep
44th	David Curtis	Rep	David Curtis	Rep
45th	Dan Soucek	Rep	Dan Soucek	Rep
46th	Warren Daniel	Rep	Warren Daniel	Rep
47th	Ralph Hise	Rep	Ralph Hise	Rep
48th	Tom Apodaca	Rep	Tom Apodaca	Rep
49th	Terry Van Duyn	Dem	Terry Van Duyn	Dem
50th	Jim Davis	Rep	Jim Davis	Rep

† – Incumbent not seeking re-election

== Detailed results ==
=== Districts 1–25 ===
==== District 1 ====
Incumbent Republican Bill Cook has represented the 1st district since 2013.
Former state Senator Stan M. White challenged Cook again and lost.

North Carolina Senate 1st district general election, 2014
Party	Candidate	Votes	%
Republican	Bill Cook (incumbent)	32,143	53.48%
Democratic	Stan White	27,957	46.52%
Total votes		60,100	100%
Republican hold			

==== District 2 ====
Incumbent Republican Norman W. Sanderson has represented the 2nd district since 2013.

North Carolina Senate 2nd district general election, 2014
Party	Candidate	Votes	%
Republican	Norman W. Sanderson (incumbent)	36,562	60.45%
Democratic	Carroll G. (Carr) Ipock II	23,925	39.55%
Total votes		60,487	100%
Republican hold			

==== District 3 ====
Incumbent Democrat Clark Jenkins has represented the 3rd district since 2003.
Jenkins was defeated by Erica Smith-Ingram in the Democratic primary.

North Carolina Senate 3rd district general election, 2014
Party	Candidate	Votes	%
Democratic	Erica Smith-Ingram	39,635	100%
Total votes		39,635	100%
Democratic hold			

==== District 4 ====
Incumbent Democrat Angela Bryant has represented the 4th district since 2013.

North Carolina Senate 4th district general election, 2014
Party	Candidate	Votes	%
Democratic	Angela Bryant (incumbent)	37,590	65.50%
Republican	Richard Scott	19,796	34.50%
Total votes		57,386	100%
Democratic hold			

==== District 5 ====
Incumbent Democrat Don Davis has represented the 5th district since 2013 and previously from 2009 to 2011.

North Carolina Senate 5th district general election, 2014
Party	Candidate	Votes	%
Democratic	Don Davis (incumbent)	35,740	100%
Total votes		35,740	100%
Democratic hold			

==== District 6 ====
Incumbent Republican Majority Leader Harry Brown has represented the 6th district since 2004.

North Carolina Senate 6th district general election, 2014
Party	Candidate	Votes	%
Republican	Harry Brown (incumbent)	26,604	100%
Total votes		26,604	100%
Republican hold			

==== District 7 ====
Incumbent Republican Louis M. Pate Jr. has represented the 7th district and its predecessors since 2011.

North Carolina Senate 7th district general election, 2014
Party	Candidate	Votes	%
Republican	Louis M. Pate Jr. (incumbent)	37,323	68.80%
Democratic	Erik Anderson	16,924	31.20%
Total votes		54,247	100%
Republican hold			

==== District 8 ====
Incumbent Republican Bill Rabon has represented the 8th district since 2011.

North Carolina Senate 8th district general election, 2014
Party	Candidate	Votes	%
Republican	Bill Rabon (incumbent)	39,402	57.01%
Democratic	Ernie Ward	29,707	42.99%
Total votes		69,109	100%
Republican hold			

==== District 9 ====
Incumbent Republican Michael Lee has represented the 9th district since 2014.

North Carolina Senate 9th district general election, 2014
Party	Candidate	Votes	%
Republican	Michael Lee (incumbent)	35,517	55.36%
Democratic	Elizabeth Redenbaugh	28,637	44.64%
Total votes		64,154	100%
Republican hold			

==== District 10 ====
Incumbent Republican Brent Jackson has represented the 10th district since 2011.

North Carolina Senate 10th district general election, 2014
Party	Candidate	Votes	%
Republican	Brent Jackson (incumbent)	31,239	62.46%
Democratic	Donald B. Rains	18,779	37.54%
Total votes		50,018	100%
Republican hold			

==== District 11 ====
Incumbent Republican Buck Newton has represented the 11th district since 2011.

North Carolina Senate 11th district general election, 2014
Party	Candidate	Votes	%
Republican	Buck Newton (incumbent)	42,364	100%
Total votes		42,364	100%
Republican hold			

==== District 12 ====
Incumbent Republican Ronald Rabin has represented the 12th district since 2013.

North Carolina Senate 12th district general election, 2014
Party	Candidate	Votes	%
Republican	Ronald Rabin (incumbent)	26,903	55.96%
Democratic	Joe Langley	21,169	44.04%
Total votes		48,072	100%
Republican hold			

==== District 13 ====
Incumbent Democrat Michael Walters has represented the 13th district since 2009.
Walters didn't seek re-election and was succeeded by fellow Democrat Jane Smith.

North Carolina Senate 13th district general election, 2014
Party	Candidate	Votes	%
Democratic	Jane Smith	24,076	62.78%
Republican	Bernard White	14,276	37.22%
Total votes		38,352	100%
Democratic hold			

==== District 14 ====
Incumbent Democrat Dan Blue has represented the 14th district since 2009.

North Carolina Senate 14th district general election, 2014
Party	Candidate	Votes	%
Democratic	Dan Blue (incumbent)	44,879	100%
Total votes		44,879	100%
Democratic hold			

==== District 15 ====
Incumbent Republican Neal Hunt has represented the 15th district since 2005.
Hunt didn't seek re-election and was succeeded by Republican John M. Alexander Jr.

North Carolina Senate 15th district general election, 2014
Party	Candidate	Votes	%
Republican	John M. Alexander Jr.	41,366	50.43%
Democratic	Tom Bradshaw	40,665	49.57%
Total votes		82,031	100%
Republican hold			

==== District 16 ====
Incumbent Democrat Josh Stein has represented the 16th district since 2009.

North Carolina Senate 16th district general election, 2014
Party	Candidate	Votes	%
Democratic	Josh Stein (incumbent)	42,422	67.11%
Republican	Molotov Mitchell	20,791	32.89%
Total votes		63,213	100%
Democratic hold			

==== District 17 ====
Incumbent Republican Tamara P. Barringer has represented the 17th district since 2013.

North Carolina Senate 17th district general election, 2014
Party	Candidate	Votes	%
Republican	Tamara P. Barringer (incumbent)	44,292	58.46%
Democratic	Bryan Fulghum	31,476	41.54%
Total votes		75,768	100%
Republican hold			

==== District 18 ====
Incumbent Republican Chad Barefoot has represented 18th district since 2013.

North Carolina Senate 18th district general election, 2014
Party	Candidate	Votes	%
Republican	Chad Barefoot (incumbent)	34,646	52.89%
Democratic	Sarah Crawford	30,861	47.11%
Total votes		65,507	100%
Republican hold			

==== District 19 ====
Incumbent Republican Wesley Meredith has represented the 19th district since 2011.

North Carolina Senate 19th district general election, 2014
Party	Candidate	Votes	%
Republican	Wesley Meredith (incumbent)	23,636	54.44%
Democratic	Billy Richardson	19,781	45.56%
Total votes		43,417	100%
Republican hold			

==== District 20 ====
Incumbent Democrat Floyd McKissick Jr. has represented the 20th district since 2007.

North Carolina Senate 20th district general election, 2014
Party	Candidate	Votes	%
Democratic	Floyd McKissick Jr. (incumbent)	46,482	100%
Total votes		46,482	100%
Democratic hold			

==== District 21 ====
Incumbent Democrat Ben Clark has represented the 21st district since 2013.

North Carolina Senate 21st district general election, 2014
Party	Candidate	Votes	%
Democratic	Ben Clark (incumbent)	31,663	100%
Total votes		31,663	100%
Democratic hold			

==== District 22 ====
Incumbent Democrat Mike Woodard has represented the 22nd district since 2013.

North Carolina Senate 22nd district general election, 2014
Party	Candidate	Votes	%
Democratic	Mike Woodard (incumbent)	47,978	67.13%
Republican	Herman Joubert	23,491	32.87%
Total votes		71,469	100%
Democratic hold			

==== District 23 ====
Incumbent Democrat Valerie Foushee has represented the 23rd district since her appointment in September 2013.
Foushee is seeking her first full term.

North Carolina Senate 23rd district general election, 2014
Party	Candidate	Votes	%
Democratic	Valerie Foushee (incumbent)	53,652	68.20%
Republican	Mary Lopez-Carter	25,021	31.80%
Total votes		78,673	100%
Democratic hold			

==== District 24 ====
Incumbent Republican Rick Gunn has represented the 24th district since 2011.

North Carolina Senate 24th district general election, 2014
Party	Candidate	Votes	%
Republican	Rick Gunn (incumbent)	37,454	100%
Total votes		37,454	100%
Republican hold			

==== District 25 ====
Incumbent Democrat Gene McLaurin has represented the 25th district since 2012.
McLaurin was defeated for re-election by Republican Tom McInnis.

North Carolina Senate 25th district general election, 2014
Party	Candidate	Votes	%
Republican	Tom McInnis	28,496	50.40%
Democratic	Gene McLaurin (incumbent)	26,632	47.10%
Libertarian	P. H. Dawkins	1,412	2.50%
Total votes		56,540	100%
Republican gain from Democratic			

=== Districts 26–50 ===
==== District 26 ====
Incumbent Republican president pro tempore Phil Berger has represented the 26th district since and its predecessors since 2001.

North Carolina Senate 26th district general election, 2014
Party	Candidate	Votes	%
Republican	Phil Berger (incumbent)	40,352	59.17%
Democratic	William Osborne	27,845	40.83%
Total votes		68,197	100%
Republican hold			

==== District 27 ====
Incumbent Republican Trudy Wade has represented the 27th district since 2013.

North Carolina Senate 27th district general election, 2014
Party	Candidate	Votes	%
Republican	Trudy Wade (incumbent)	46,814	100%
Total votes		46,814	100%
Republican hold			

==== District 28 ====
Incumbent Democrat Gladys A. Robinson has represented the 28th district since 2011.

North Carolina Senate 28th district general election, 2014
Party	Candidate	Votes	%
Democratic	Gladys A. Robinson (incumbent)	43,286	100%
Total votes		43,286	100%
Democratic hold			

==== District 29 ====
Incumbent Republican Jerry W. Tillman has represented the 29th district since

North Carolina Senate 29th district general election, 2014
Party	Candidate	Votes	%
Republican	Jerry W. Tillman (incumbent)	41,100	70.86%
Democratic	Tommy Davis	16,901	29.14%
Total votes		58,001	100%
Republican hold			

==== District 30 ====
Incumbent Republican Shirley B. Randleman has represented the 30th district since 2012.

North Carolina Senate 30th district general election, 2014
Party	Candidate	Votes	%
Republican	Shirley B. Randleman (incumbent)	35,783	71.06%
Democratic	Eva P. Ingle	14,572	28.94%
Total votes		50,355	100%
Republican hold			

==== District 31 ====
Incumbent Republican Joyce Krawiec has represented the 31st district since her appointment in January 2014.
Krawiec is seeking her first full term.

North Carolina Senate 31st district general election, 2014
Party	Candidate	Votes	%
Republican	Joyce Krawiec (incumbent)	45,915	64.82%
Democratic	John K. Motsinger Sr.	24,922	35.18%
Total votes		70,837	100%
Republican hold			

==== District 32 ====
Incumbent Democrat Earline Parmon has represented the 32nd district since 2013.

North Carolina Senate 32nd district general election, 2014
Party	Candidate	Votes	%
Democratic	Earline Parmon (incumbent)	36,045	100%
Total votes		36,045	100%
Democratic hold			

==== District 33 ====
Incumbent Republican Stan Bingham has represented the 33rd district and its predecessors since 2001.

North Carolina Senate 33rd district general election, 2014
Party	Candidate	Votes	%
Republican	Stan Bingham (incumbent)	38,784	100%
Total votes		38,784	100%
Republican hold			

==== District 34 ====
Incumbent Republican Andrew C. Brock has represented the 34th district since 2003.

North Carolina Senate 34th district general election, 2014
Party	Candidate	Votes	%
Republican	Andrew C. Brock (incumbent)	38,010	66.05%
Democratic	Constance L. (Connie) Johnson	19,533	33.95%
Total votes		57,543	100%
Republican hold			

==== District 35 ====
Incumbent Republican Tommy Tucker has represented the 35th district since 2011.

North Carolina Senate 35th district general election, 2014
Party	Candidate	Votes	%
Republican	Tommy Tucker (incumbent)	39,188	100%
Total votes		39,188	100%
Republican hold			

==== District 36 ====
Incumbent Republican Fletcher L. Hartsell Jr. has represented the 36th district and its predecessors since 1991.

North Carolina Senate 36th district general election, 2014
Party	Candidate	Votes	%
Republican	Fletcher L. Hartsell Jr. (incumbent)	39,774	100%
Total votes		39,774	100%
Republican hold			

==== District 37 ====
Incumbent Democrat Jeff Jackson has represented the 37th district since his appointment on May 6, 2014.
Jackson is seeking his first full term.

North Carolina Senate 37th district general election, 2014
Party	Candidate	Votes	%
Democratic	Jeff Jackson (incumbent)	31,392	100%
Total votes		31,392	100%
Democratic hold			

==== District 38 ====
Incumbent Democrat Joel Ford has represented the 38th district since 2013.

North Carolina Senate 38th district general election, 2014
Party	Candidate	Votes	%
Democratic	Joel Ford (incumbent)	35,366	79.71%
Republican	Richard Rivette	9,003	20.29%
Total votes		44,369	100%
Democratic hold			

==== District 39 ====
Incumbent Republican Bob Rucho has represented the 39th district and its predecessors since 2008 and previously from 1997 to 2005.

North Carolina Senate 39th district general election, 2014
Party	Candidate	Votes	%
Republican	Bob Rucho (incumbent)	44,091	100%
Total votes		44,091	100%
Republican hold			

==== District 40 ====
Incumbent Democrat Malcolm Graham has represented the 40th district since 2005.
Graham didn't seek re-election, insteading unsuccessfully seeking election to the U.S House.

North Carolina Senate 40th district general election, 2014
Party	Candidate	Votes	%
Democratic	Joyce Waddell	34,788	100%
Total votes		34,788	100%
Democratic hold			

==== District 41 ====
Incumbent Republican Jeff Tarte has represented the 41st district since 2013.

North Carolina Senate 41st district general election, 2014
Party	Candidate	Votes	%
Republican	Jeff Tarte (incumbent)	35,572	60.47%
Democratic	Latrice McRae	23,255	39.53%
Total votes		58,827	100%
Republican hold			

==== District 42 ====
Incumbent Republican Austin M. Allran has represented the 42nd district and its predecessors since 1986.
Allran isn't seeking re-election. Representative Andy Wells won the open seat.

North Carolina Senate 42nd district general election, 2014
Party	Candidate	Votes	%
Republican	Andy Wells	31,869	59.49%
Democratic	Patrice (Pat) Hensley	21,703	40.51%
Total votes		53,572	100%
Republican hold			

==== District 43 ====
Incumbent Republican Kathy Harrington has represented the 43rd district since 2011.

North Carolina Senate 43rd district general election, 2014
Party	Candidate	Votes	%
Republican	Kathy Harrington (incumbent)	36,978	100%
Total votes		36,978	100%
Republican hold			

==== District 44 ====
Incumbent Republican David Curtis has represented the 44th district since 2013.

North Carolina Senate 44th district general election, 2014
Party	Candidate	Votes	%
Republican	David Curtis (incumbent)	45,722	100%
Total votes		45,722	100%
Republican hold			

==== District 45 ====
Incumbent Republican Dan Soucek has represented the 45th district since 2011.

North Carolina Senate 45th district general election, 2014
Party	Candidate	Votes	%
Republican	Dan Soucek (incumbent)	33,165	60.18%
Democratic	Jim Sponenberg	21,941	39.82%
Total votes		55,106	100%
Republican hold			

==== District 46 ====
Incumbent Republican Warren Daniel has represented the 46th district and its predecessors since 2011.

North Carolina Senate 46th district general election, 2014
Party	Candidate	Votes	%
Republican	Warren Daniel (incumbent)	30,373	58.71%
Democratic	Emily B. Church	21,363	41.29%
Total votes		51,736	100%
Republican hold			

==== District 47 ====
Incumbent Republican Ralph Hise has represented the 47th district since 2011.

North Carolina Senate 47th district general election, 2014
Party	Candidate	Votes	%
Republican	Ralph Hise (incumbent)	39,299	100%
Total votes		39,299	100%
Republican hold			

==== District 48 ====
Incumbent Republican Tom Apodaca has represented the 48th district since 2003.

North Carolina Senate 48th district general election, 2014
Party	Candidate	Votes	%
Republican	Tom Apodaca (incumbent)	37,664	57.42%
Democratic	Rick Wood	27,925	42.58%
Total votes		65,589	100%
Republican hold			

==== District 49 ====
Incumbent Democrat Terry Van Duyn has represented the 49th district since her appointment in April 2014.
Van Duyn is seeking her first full term.

North Carolina Senate 49th district general election, 2014
Party	Candidate	Votes	%
Democratic	Terry Van Duyn (incumbent)	42,347	61.29%
Republican	Mark Crawford	26,745	38.71%
Total votes		69,092	100%
Democratic hold			

==== District 50 ====
Incumbent Republican Jim Davis has represented the 50th district since 2011.

North Carolina Senate 50th district general election, 2014
Party	Candidate	Votes	%
Republican	Jim Davis (incumbent)	33,820	53.86%
Democratic	Jane Hipps	28,974	46.14%
Total votes		62,974	100%
Republican hold			

== See also ==
- List of North Carolina state legislatures
