= 2016 North Carolina Senate election =

- November 8, 2016

All 50 seats in the North Carolina State Senate
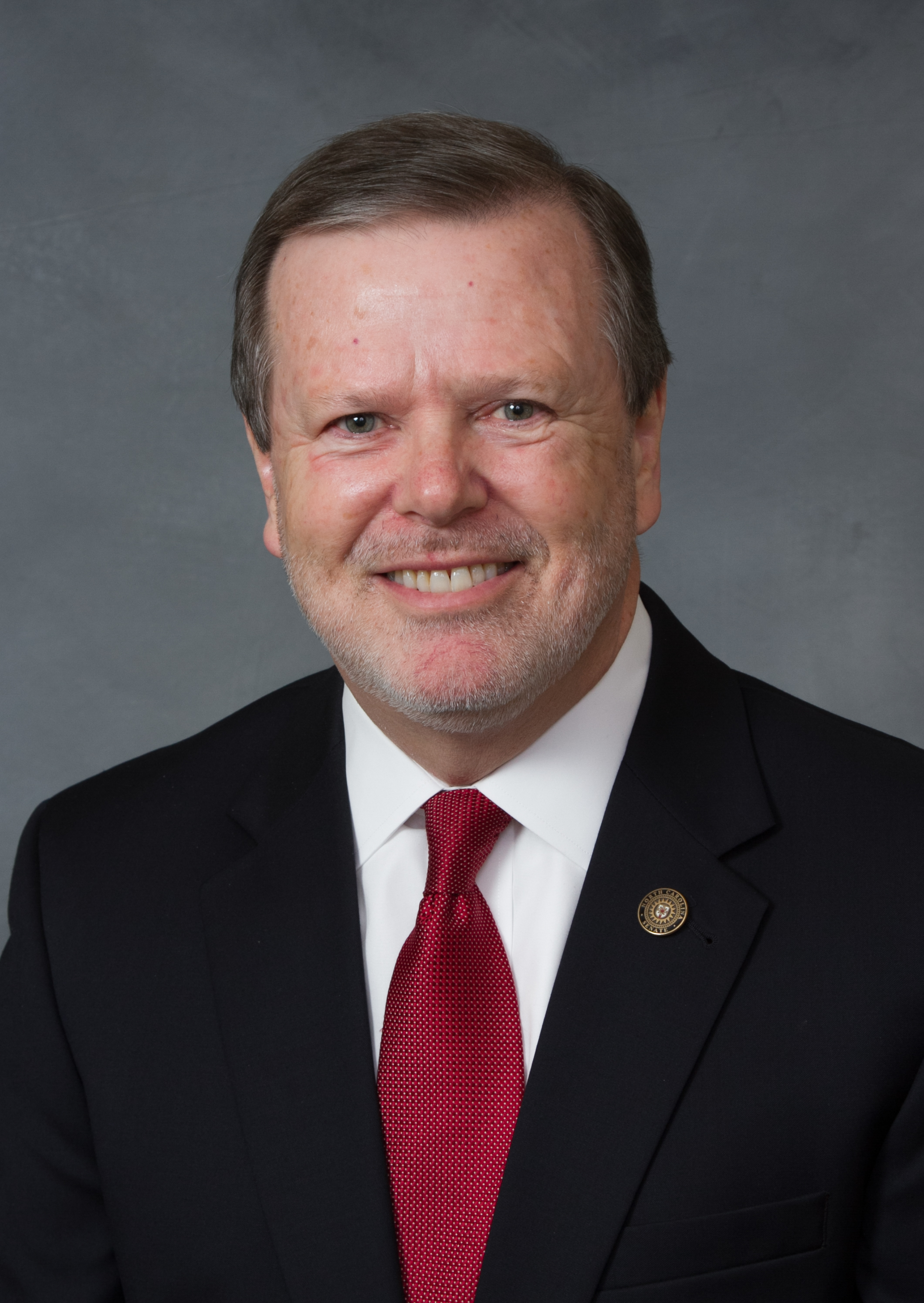

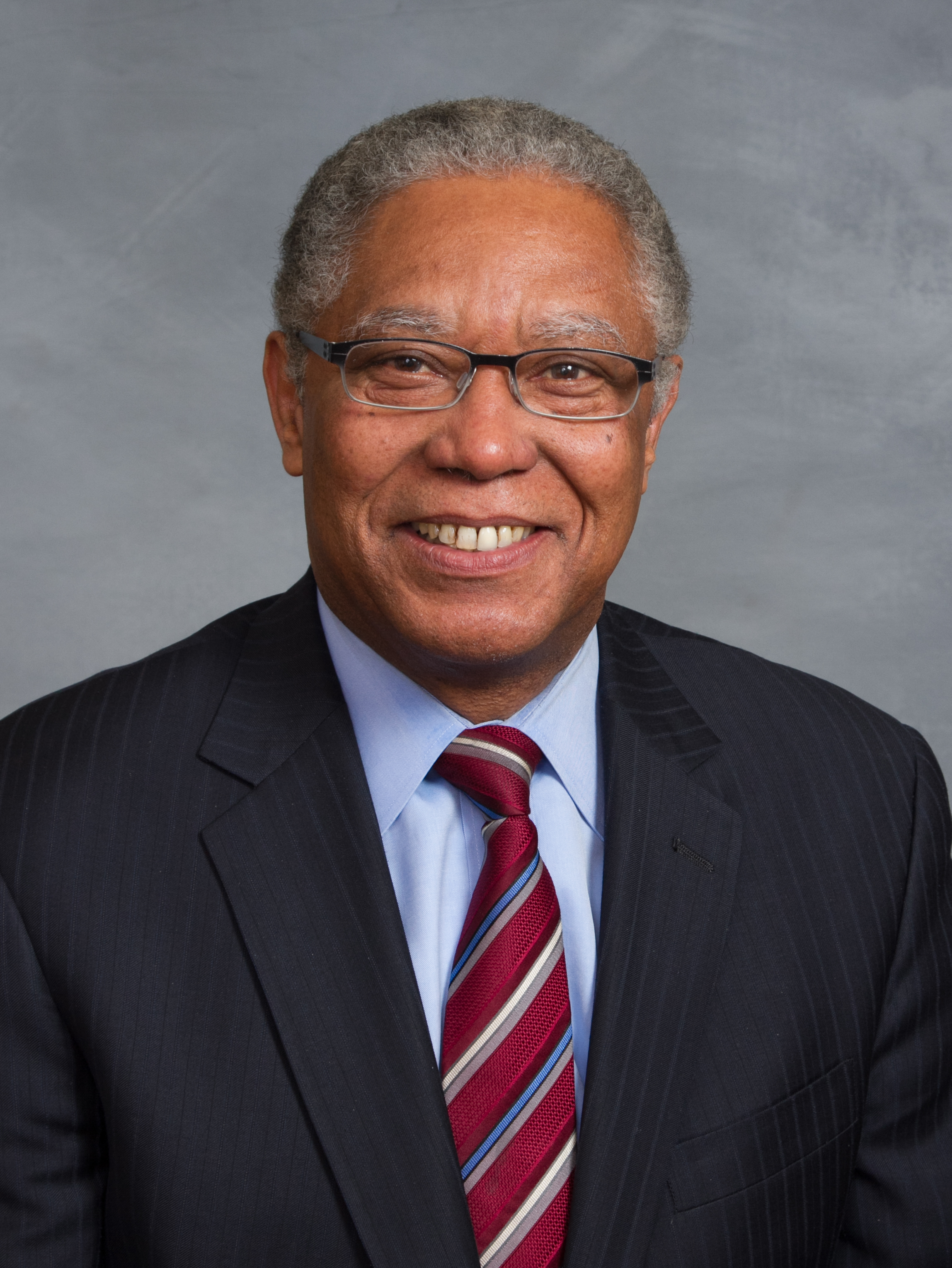
| | Majority party | Minority party |
|---|---|---|
| Leader | Phil Berger | Dan Blue |
| Party | Republican | Democratic |
| Leader since | January 1, 2005 | March 2, 2014 |
| Leader's seat | 26th - Eden | 14th - Raleigh |
| Last election | 34 | 16 |
| Seats after | 35 | 15 |
| Seat change | ▲1 | ▼1 |
| Popular vote | 2,310,285 | 1,823,648 |
| Percentage | 54.86% | 43.31% |
- Results: Democratic hold Republican hold Republican gain
President pro tempore before election
Phil Berger
Republican
President pro tempore-designate
Phil Berger
Republican

The 2016 North Carolina State Senate elections selected members to serve in the North Carolina Senate for a two-year term commencing in January 2017. Going into the election, the Senate had 34 Republican and 16 Democratic members, which constituted a two-thirds super-majority for the Republican Party. Following the election, the Senate had 35 Republican and 15 Democratic members.

== Results summary ==
| District | Incumbent | Party | Elected | Party |
|---|---|---|---|---|
| 1st | Bill Cook | Rep | Bill Cook | Rep |
| 2nd | Norman W. Sanderson | Rep | Norman W. Sanderson | Rep |
| 3rd | Erica Smith | Dem | Erica Smith | Dem |
| 4th | Angela Bryant | Dem | Angela Bryant | Dem |
| 5th | Don Davis | Dem | Don Davis | Dem |
| 6th | Harry Brown | Rep | Harry Brown | Rep |
| 7th | Louis M. Pate Jr. | Rep | Louis M. Pate Jr. | Rep |
| 8th | Bill Rabon | Rep | Bill Rabon | Rep |
| 9th | Michael V. Lee | Rep | Michael V. Lee | Rep |
| 10th | Brent Jackson | Rep | Brent Jackson | Rep |
| 11th | Buck Newton† | Rep | Rick Horner | Rep |
| 12th | Ronald Rabin | Rep | Ronald Rabin | Rep |
| 13th | Jane W. Smith | Dem | Danny Britt | Rep |
| 14th | Dan Blue | Dem | Dan Blue | Dem |
| 15th | John M. Alexander Jr. | Rep | John M. Alexander Jr. | Rep |
| 16th | Jay Chaudhuri | Dem | Jay Chaudhuri | Dem |
| 17th | Tamara P. Barringer | Rep | Tamara P. Barringer | Rep |
| 18th | Chad Barefoot | Rep | Chad Barefoot | Rep |
| 19th | Wesley Meredith | Rep | Wesley Meredith | Rep |
| 20th | Floyd McKissick Jr. | Dem | Floyd McKissick Jr. | Dem |
| 21st | Ben Clark | Dem | Ben Clark | Dem |
| 22nd | Mike Woodard | Dem | Mike Woodard | Dem |
| 23rd | Valerie Foushee | Dem | Valerie Foushee | Dem |
| 24th | Rick Gunn | Rep | Rick Gunn | Rep |
| 25th | Tom McInnis | Rep | Tom McInnis | Rep |
| 26th | Phil Berger | Rep | Phil Berger | Rep |
| 27th | Trudy Wade | Rep | Trudy Wade | Rep |
| 28th | Gladys A. Robinson | Dem | Gladys A. Robinson | Dem |
| 29th | Jerry W. Tillman | Rep | Jerry W. Tillman | Rep |
| 30th | Shirley B. Randleman | Rep | Shirley B. Randleman | Rep |
| 31st | Joyce Krawiec | Rep | Joyce Krawiec | Rep |
| 32nd | Paul Lowe Jr. | Dem | Paul Lowe Jr. | Dem |
| 33rd | Stan Bingham† | Rep | Cathy Dunn | Rep |
| 34th | Andrew C. Brock | Rep | Andrew C. Brock | Rep |
| 35th | Tommy Tucker | Rep | Tommy Tucker | Rep |
| 36th | Fletcher L. Hartsell Jr.† | Rep | Paul Newton | Rep |
| 37th | Jeff Jackson | Dem | Jeff Jackson | Dem |
| 38th | Joel Ford | Dem | Joel Ford | Dem |
| 39th | Bob Rucho† | Rep | Dan Bishop | Rep |
| 40th | Joyce Waddell | Dem | Joyce Waddell | Dem |
| 41st | Jeff Tarte | Rep | Jeff Tarte | Rep |
| 42nd | Andy Wells | Rep | Andy Wells | Rep |
| 43rd | Kathy Harrington | Rep | Kathy Harrington | Rep |
| 44th | David L. Curtis | Rep | David L. Curtis | Rep |
| 45th | Deanna Ballard | Rep | Deanna Ballard | Rep |
| 46th | Warren Daniel | Rep | Warren Daniel | Rep |
| 47th | Ralph Hise | Rep | Ralph Hise | Rep |
| 48th | Chuck Edwards | Rep | Chuck Edwards | Rep |
| 49th | Terry Van Duyn | Dem | Terry Van Duyn | Dem |
| 50th | Jim Davis | Rep | Jim Davis | Rep |

† - Incumbent not seeking re-election

== Predictions ==
| Source | Ranking | As of |
|---|---|---|
| Governing | Lean R | October 12, 2016 |

== Detailed results ==
=== Districts 1–25 ===
==== District 1 ====
Incumbent Republican Bill Cook has represented the 1st district since 2013.

North Carolina Senate 1st district general election, 2016
| Party | Candidate | Votes | % |
|---|---|---|---|
| Republican | Bill Cook (incumbent) | 53,138 | 59.11% |
| Democratic | Brownie Futrell | 36,759 | 40.89% |
| Total votes | | 89,897 | 100% |
| Republican hold | | | |

==== District 2 ====
Incumbent Republican Norman W. Sanderson has represented the 2nd district since 2013.

North Carolina Senate 2nd district general election, 2016
| Party | Candidate | Votes | % |
|---|---|---|---|
| Republican | Norman W. Sanderson (incumbent) | 58,032 | 66.29% |
| Democratic | Dorothea E. White | 29,505 | 33.71% |
| Total votes | | 87,537 | 100% |
| Republican hold | | | |

==== District 3 ====
Incumbent Democrat Erica Smith has represented the 3rd district since 2015.

North Carolina Senate 3rd district general election, 2016
| Party | Candidate | Votes | % |
|---|---|---|---|
| Democratic | Erica Smith (incumbent) | 57,507 | 100% |
| Total votes | | 57,507 | 100% |
| Democratic hold | | | |

==== District 4 ====
Incumbent Democrat Angela Bryant has represented the 4th district since 2013.

North Carolina Senate 4th district general election, 2016
| Party | Candidate | Votes | % |
|---|---|---|---|
| Democratic | Angela Bryant (incumbent) | 56,584 | 67.67% |
| Republican | Ricard Scott | 27,038 | 32.33% |
| Total votes | | 83,622 | 100% |
| Democratic hold | | | |

==== District 5 ====
Incumbent Democrat Don Davis has represented the 5th district since 2013 and previously from 2009 to 2011.

North Carolina Senate 5th district general election, 2016
| Party | Candidate | Votes | % |
|---|---|---|---|
| Democratic | Don Davis (incumbent) | 57,882 | 100% |
| Total votes | | 57,882 | 100% |
| Democratic hold | | | |

==== District 6 ====
Incumbent Republican Majority Leader Harry Brown has represented the 6th district since 2004.

North Carolina Senate 6th district general election, 2016
| Party | Candidate | Votes | % |
|---|---|---|---|
| Republican | Harry Brown (incumbent) | 45,391 | 100% |
| Total votes | | 45,391 | 100% |
| Republican hold | | | |

==== District 7 ====
Incumbent Republican Louis M. Pate Jr. has represented the 7th district and its predecessors since 2011.

North Carolina Senate 7th district general election, 2016
| Party | Candidate | Votes | % |
|---|---|---|---|
| Republican | Louis M. Pate Jr. (incumbent) | 66,035 | 100% |
| Total votes | | 66,035 | 100% |
| Republican hold | | | |

==== District 8 ====
Incumbent Republican Bill Rabon has represented the 8th district since 2011.

North Carolina Senate 8th district general election, 2016
| Party | Candidate | Votes | % |
|---|---|---|---|
| Republican | Bill Rabon (incumbent) | 78,274 | 100% |
| Total votes | | 78,274 | 100% |
| Republican hold | | | |

==== District 9 ====
Incumbent Republican Michael V. Lee has represented the 9th district since 2014.

North Carolina Senate 9th district general election, 2016
| Party | Candidate | Votes | % |
|---|---|---|---|
| Republican | Michael V. Lee (incumbent) | 60,174 | 57.35% |
| Democratic | Andrew Barnhill | 44,743 | 42.65% |
| Total votes | | 104,917 | 100% |
| Republican hold | | | |

==== District 10 ====
Incumbent Republican Brent Jackson has represented the 10th district since 2011.

North Carolina Senate 10th district general election, 2016
| Party | Candidate | Votes | % |
|---|---|---|---|
| Republican | Brent Jackson (incumbent) | 56,610 | 100% |
| Total votes | | 56,610 | 100% |
| Republican hold | | | |

==== District 11 ====
Incumbent Republican Buck Newton has represented the 11th district since 2011.
Newton unsuccessfully sought election to become NC Attorney General.

North Carolina Senate 11th district general election, 2016
| Party | Candidate | Votes | % |
|---|---|---|---|
| Republican | Rick Horner | 55,765 | 61.17% |
| Democratic | Albert Pacer | 35,394 | 38.83% |
| Total votes | | 91,159 | 100% |
| Republican hold | | | |

==== District 12 ====
Incumbent Republican Ronald Rabin has represented the 12th district since 2013.

North Carolina Senate 12th district general election, 2016
| Party | Candidate | Votes | % |
|---|---|---|---|
| Republican | Ronald Rabin (incumbent) | 45,228 | 57.50% |
| Democratic | Susan Byerly | 33,426 | 42.50% |
| Total votes | | 78,654 | 100% |
| Republican hold | | | |

==== District 13 ====
Incumbent Democrat Jane Smith has represented the 13th district since 2015.
Smith lost re-election to Republican Danny Britt

North Carolina Senate 13th district general election, 2016
| Party | Candidate | Votes | % |
|---|---|---|---|
| Republican | Danny Britt | 34,126 | 54.98% |
| Democratic | Jane Smith (incumbent) | 27,940 | 45.02% |
| Total votes | | 62,066 | 100% |
| Republican gain from Democratic | | | |

==== District 14 ====
Incumbent Democrat Dan Blue has represented the 14th district since 2009.

North Carolina Senate 14th district general election, 2016
| Party | Candidate | Votes | % |
|---|---|---|---|
| Democratic | Dan Blue (incumbent) | 73,870 | 100% |
| Total votes | | 73,870 | 100% |
| Democratic hold | | | |

==== District 15 ====
Incumbent Republican John M. Alexander Jr. has represented the 15th district since 2015.

North Carolina Senate 15th district general election, 2016
| Party | Candidate | Votes | % |
|---|---|---|---|
| Republican | John M. Alexander Jr. (incumbent) | 58,999 | 50.01% |
| Democratic | Lauren Deegan-Fricke | 53,905 | 45.69% |
| Libertarian | Brad Hessel | 5,081 | 4.31% |
| Total votes | | 117,985 | 100% |
| Republican hold | | | |

==== District 16 ====
Incumbent Democrat Jay Chaudhuri has represented the 16th district since 2016.
Chaudhuri is seeking his first full term.

North Carolina Senate 16th district general election, 2016
| Party | Candidate | Votes | % |
|---|---|---|---|
| Democratic | Jay Chaudhuri (incumbent) | 68,842 | 65.33% |
| Republican | Eric Weaver | 36,530 | 34.67% |
| Total votes | | 105,372 | 100% |
| Democratic hold | | | |

==== District 17 ====
Incumbent Republican Tamara P. Barringer has represented the 17th district since 2013.

North Carolina Senate 17th district general election, 2016
| Party | Candidate | Votes | % |
|---|---|---|---|
| Republican | Tamara P. Barringer (incumbent) | 59,105 | 48.30% |
| Democratic | Susan P. Evans | 58,063 | 47.45% |
| Libertarian | Susan J. Hogarth | 5,191 | 4.24% |
| Total votes | | 122,359 | 100% |
| Republican hold | | | |

==== District 18 ====
Incumbent Republican Chad Barefoot has represented 18th district since 2013.

North Carolina Senate 18th district general election, 2016
| Party | Candidate | Votes | % |
|---|---|---|---|
| Republican | Chad Barefoot (incumbent) | 57,121 | 55.34% |
| Democratic | Gil Johnson | 46,105 | 44.66% |
| Total votes | | 103,226 | 100% |
| Republican hold | | | |

==== District 19 ====
Incumbent Republican Wesley Meredith has represented the 19th district since 2011.

North Carolina Senate 19th district general election, 2016
| Party | Candidate | Votes | % |
|---|---|---|---|
| Republican | Wesley Meredith (incumbent) | 40,359 | 56.44% |
| Democratic | Toni Morris | 31,149 | 43.56% |
| Total votes | | 71,508 | 100% |
| Republican hold | | | |

==== District 20 ====
Incumbent Democrat Floyd McKissick Jr. has represented the 20th district since 2007.

North Carolina Senate 20th district general election, 2016
| Party | Candidate | Votes | % |
|---|---|---|---|
| Democratic | Floyd McKissick Jr. (incumbent) | 71,865 | 81.60% |
| Libertarian | Barbara Howe | 16,202 | 18.40% |
| Total votes | | 88,067 | 100% |
| Democratic hold | | | |

==== District 21 ====
Incumbent Democrat Ben Clark has represented the 21st district since 2013.

North Carolina Senate 21st district general election, 2016
| Party | Candidate | Votes | % |
|---|---|---|---|
| Democratic | Ben Clark (incumbent) | 49,081 | 71.74% |
| Republican | Dan Travieso | 19,338 | 28.26% |
| Total votes | | 68,419 | 100% |
| Democratic hold | | | |

==== District 22 ====
Incumbent Democrat Mike Woodard has represented the 22nd district since 2013.

North Carolina Senate 22nd district general election, 2016
| Party | Candidate | Votes | % |
|---|---|---|---|
| Democratic | Mike Woodard (incumbent) | 74,693 | 65.58% |
| Republican | T. Greg Doucette | 39,198 | 34.42% |
| Total votes | | 113,891 | 100% |
| Democratic hold | | | |

==== District 23 ====
Incumbent Democrat Valerie Foushee has represented the 23rd district since 2013.

North Carolina Senate 23rd district general election, 2016
| Party | Candidate | Votes | % |
|---|---|---|---|
| Democratic | Valerie Foushee (incumbent) | 79,520 | 68.06% |
| Republican | Mary Lopez Carter | 37,322 | 31.94% |
| Total votes | | 116,842 | 100% |
| Democratic hold | | | |

==== District 24 ====
Incumbent Republican Rick Gunn has represented the 24th district since 2011.

North Carolina Senate 24th district general election, 2016
| Party | Candidate | Votes | % |
|---|---|---|---|
| Republican | Rick Gunn (incumbent) | 51,833 | 60.77% |
| Democratic | John Thorpe | 33,456 | 39.23% |
| Total votes | | 85,289 | 100% |
| Republican hold | | | |

==== District 25 ====
Incumbent Republican Tom McInnis has represented the 25th district since 2015.

North Carolina Senate 25th district general election, 2016
| Party | Candidate | Votes | % |
|---|---|---|---|
| Republican | Tom McInnis (incumbent) | 53,621 | 63.81% |
| Democratic | Dannie M. Montgomery | 30,416 | 36.19% |
| Total votes | | 84,037 | 100% |
| Republican hold | | | |

=== Districts 26–50 ===
==== District 26 ====
Incumbent Republican president pro tempore Phil Berger has represented the 26th district since and its predecessors since 2001.

North Carolina Senate 26th district general election, 2016
| Party | Candidate | Votes | % |
|---|---|---|---|
| Republican | Phil Berger (incumbent) | 67,908 | 100% |
| Total votes | | 67,908 | 100% |
| Republican hold | | | |

==== District 27 ====
Incumbent Republican Trudy Wade has represented the 27th district since 2013.

North Carolina Senate 27th district general election, 2016
| Party | Candidate | Votes | % |
|---|---|---|---|
| Republican | Trudy Wade (incumbent) | 54,512 | 53.32% |
| Democratic | Michael Garrett | 47,731 | 46.68% |
| Total votes | | 102,243 | 100% |
| Republican hold | | | |

==== District 28 ====
Incumbent Democrat Gladys A. Robinson has represented the 28th district since 2011.

North Carolina Senate 28th district general election, 2016
| Party | Candidate | Votes | % |
|---|---|---|---|
| Democratic | Gladys A. Robinson (incumbent) | 74,232 | 83.88% |
| Republican | Devin R. King | 14,265 | 16.12% |
| Total votes | | 88,497 | 100% |
| Democratic hold | | | |

==== District 29 ====
Incumbent Republican Jerry W. Tillman has represented the 29th district since

North Carolina Senate 29th district general election, 2016
| Party | Candidate | Votes | % |
|---|---|---|---|
| Republican | Jerry W. Tillman (incumbent) | 71,648 | 100% |
| Total votes | | 71,648 | 100% |
| Republican hold | | | |

==== District 30 ====
Incumbent Republican Shirley B. Randleman has represented the 30th district since 2012.

North Carolina Senate 30th district general election, 2016
| Party | Candidate | Votes | % |
|---|---|---|---|
| Republican | Shirley B. Randleman (incumbent) | 59,602 | 72.65% |
| Democratic | Michael W. Holleman | 22,435 | 27.35% |
| Total votes | | 82,037 | 100% |
| Republican hold | | | |

==== District 31 ====
Incumbent Republican Joyce Krawiec has represented the 31st district since 2014.

North Carolina Senate 31st district general election, 2016
| Party | Candidate | Votes | % |
|---|---|---|---|
| Republican | Joyce Krawiec (incumbent) | 83,599 | 100% |
| Total votes | | 83,599 | 100% |
| Republican hold | | | |

==== District 32 ====
Incumbent Democrat Paul Lowe Jr. has represented the 32nd district since 2015.

North Carolina Senate 32nd district general election, 2016
| Party | Candidate | Votes | % |
|---|---|---|---|
| Democratic | Paul Lowe Jr. (incumbent) | 63,691 | 100% |
| Total votes | | 63,691 | 100% |
| Democratic hold | | | |

==== District 33 ====
Incumbent Republican Stan Bingham has represented the 33rd district and its predecessors since 2001.
Bingham didn't seek re-election.

North Carolina Senate 33rd district general election, 2016
| Party | Candidate | Votes | % |
|---|---|---|---|
| Republican | Cathy Dunn | 59,367 | 71.38% |
| Democratic | Jim Beall Graham | 23,809 | 28.62% |
| Total votes | | 83,176 | 100% |
| Republican hold | | | |

==== District 34 ====
Incumbent Republican Andrew C. Brock has represented the 34th district since 2003.

North Carolina Senate 34th district general election, 2016
| Party | Candidate | Votes | % |
|---|---|---|---|
| Republican | Andrew C. Brock (incumbent) | 69,470 | 100% |
| Total votes | | 69,470 | 100% |
| Republican hold | | | |

==== District 35 ====
Incumbent Republican Tommy Tucker has represented the 35th district since 2011.

North Carolina Senate 35th district general election, 2016
| Party | Candidate | Votes | % |
|---|---|---|---|
| Republican | Tommy Tucker (incumbent) | 73,032 | 100% |
| Total votes | | 73,032 | 100% |
| Republican hold | | | |

==== District 36 ====
Incumbent Republican Fletcher L. Hartsell Jr. has represented the 36th district and its predecessors since 1991.
Hartsell didn't seek re-election. Republican Paul Newton won the open seat.

North Carolina Senate 36th district general election, 2016
| Party | Candidate | Votes | % |
|---|---|---|---|
| Republican | Paul Newton | 59,584 | 62.56% |
| Democratic | Robert Brown | 35,664 | 37.44% |
| Total votes | | 95,248 | 100% |
| Republican hold | | | |

==== District 37 ====
Incumbent Democrat Jeff Jackson has represented the 37th district since 2014.

North Carolina Senate 37th district general election, 2016
| Party | Candidate | Votes | % |
|---|---|---|---|
| Democratic | Jeff Jackson (incumbent) | 57,804 | 67.94% |
| Republican | Bob Diamond | 27,279 | 32.06% |
| Total votes | | 85,083 | 100% |
| Democratic hold | | | |

==== District 38 ====
Incumbent Democrat Joel Ford has represented the 38th district since 2013.

North Carolina Senate 38th district general election, 2016
| Party | Candidate | Votes | % |
|---|---|---|---|
| Democratic | Joel Ford (incumbent) | 67,059 | 79.06% |
| Republican | Richard Rivette | 17,764 | 20.94% |
| Total votes | | 84,823 | 100% |
| Democratic hold | | | |

==== District 39 ====
Incumbent Republican Bob Rucho has represented the 39th district since 2008.
Rucho didn't seek re-election. Representative Dan Bishop won the open seat.

North Carolina Senate 39th district general election, 2016
| Party | Candidate | Votes | % |
|---|---|---|---|
| Republican | Dan Bishop | 58,739 | 56.81% |
| Democratic | Lloyd Scher | 44,655 | 43.19% |
| Total votes | | 103,394 | 100% |
| Republican hold | | | |

==== District 40 ====
Incumbent Democrat Joyce Waddell has represented the 40th district since 2015.

North Carolina Senate 40th district general election, 2016
| Party | Candidate | Votes | % |
|---|---|---|---|
| Democratic | Joyce Waddell (incumbent) | 61,481 | 82.51% |
| Republican | Marguerite Cooke | 13,032 | 17.49% |
| Total votes | | 74,513 | 100% |
| Democratic hold | | | |

==== District 41 ====
Incumbent Republican Jeff Tarte has represented the 41st district since 2013.

North Carolina Senate 41st district general election, 2016
| Party | Candidate | Votes | % |
|---|---|---|---|
| Republican | Jeff Tarte (incumbent) | 55,519 | 54.48% |
| Democratic | Jonathan Hudson | 41,453 | 40.68% |
| Libertarian | Chris Cole | 4,938 | 4.85% |
| Total votes | | 101,910 | 100% |
| Republican hold | | | |

==== District 42 ====
Incumbent Republican Andy Wells has represented the 42nd district since 2015.

North Carolina Senate 42nd district general election, 2016
| Party | Candidate | Votes | % |
|---|---|---|---|
| Republican | Andy Wells (incumbent) | 69,301 | 100% |
| Total votes | | 69,301 | 100% |
| Republican hold | | | |

==== District 43 ====
Incumbent Republican Kathy Harrington has represented the 43rd district since 2011.

North Carolina Senate 43rd district general election, 2016
| Party | Candidate | Votes | % |
|---|---|---|---|
| Republican | Kathy Harrington (incumbent) | 65,054 | 100% |
| Total votes | | 65,054 | 100% |
| Republican hold | | | |

==== District 44 ====
Incumbent Republican David L. Curtis has represented the 44th district since 2013.

North Carolina Senate 44th district general election, 2016
| Party | Candidate | Votes | % |
|---|---|---|---|
| Republican | David L. Curtis (incumbent) | 71,114 | 77.30% |
| Libertarian | Nic Haag | 20,881 | 22.70% |
| Total votes | | 91,995 | 100% |
| Republican hold | | | |

==== District 45 ====
Incumbent Republican Deanna Ballard has represented the 45th district since 2016.

North Carolina Senate 45th district general election, 2016
| Party | Candidate | Votes | % |
|---|---|---|---|
| Republican | Deanna Ballard (incumbent) | 56,758 | 65.00% |
| Democratic | Art Sherwood | 30,559 | 35.00% |
| Total votes | | 87,317 | 100% |
| Republican hold | | | |

==== District 46 ====
Incumbent Republican Warren Daniel has represented the 46th district and its predecessors since 2011.

North Carolina Senate 46th district general election, 2016
| Party | Candidate | Votes | % |
|---|---|---|---|
| Republican | Warren Daniel (incumbent) | 52,997 | 66.16% |
| Democratic | Anne Fisher | 27,106 | 33.84% |
| Total votes | | 80,103 | 100% |
| Republican hold | | | |

==== District 47 ====
Incumbent Republican Ralph Hise has represented the 47th district since 2011.

North Carolina Senate 47th district general election, 2016
| Party | Candidate | Votes | % |
|---|---|---|---|
| Republican | Ralph Hise (incumbent) | 56,021 | 64.85% |
| Democratic | Mary Jane Boyd | 30,364 | 35.15% |
| Total votes | | 86,385 | 100% |
| Republican hold | | | |

==== District 48 ====
Incumbent Republican Chuck Edwards has represented the 48th district since 2016.

North Carolina Senate 48th district general election, 2016
| Party | Candidate | Votes | % |
|---|---|---|---|
| Republican | Chuck Edwards (incumbent) | 61,455 | 62.04% |
| Democratic | Norman Bossert | 37,596 | 37.96% |
| Total votes | | 99,051 | 100% |
| Republican hold | | | |

==== District 49 ====
Incumbent Democrat Terry Van Duyn has represented the 49th district since 2014.

North Carolina Senate 49th district general election, 2016
| Party | Candidate | Votes | % |
|---|---|---|---|
| Democratic | Terry Van Duyn (incumbent) | 71,828 | 74.43% |
| Libertarian | William Meredith | 24,672 | 25.57% |
| Total votes | | 96,500 | 100% |
| Democratic hold | | | |

==== District 50 ====
Incumbent Republican Jim Davis has represented the 50th district since 2011.

North Carolina Senate 50th district general election, 2016
| Party | Candidate | Votes | % |
|---|---|---|---|
| Republican | Jim Davis (incumbent) | 59,028 | 62.46% |
| Democratic | Jane Hipps | 35,476 | 37.54% |
| Total votes | | 94,504 | 100% |
| Republican hold | | | |

== See also ==
- List of North Carolina state legislatures
