= Eisenhauer =

Eisenhauer is a surname derived from the German word Eisenhauer, meaning "iron hewer". Other forms of the name include Eisenhower and Isenhour.

Notable people with the name include:

- Elizabeth Eisenhauer, Canadian oncologist
- Frank Eisenhauer (born 1968), German astronomer and astrophysicist
- James Daniel Eisenhauer (1832–1896), Canadian merchant and politician
- Larry Eisenhauer (1940–2020), American football player
- Letty Eisenhauer (1935–2023), American performance artist and forensic psychologist
- Nico Eisenhauer (born 1980), German biologist and soil ecologist
- Peggy Eisenhauer, American lighting designer
- Steve Eisenhauer (1931–2016), American football player

== See also ==
- Eisenhower (surname)
- W. Stine Isenhower (1927-2023), American politician
