= Isenhour =

Isenhour is a surname derived from the German word Eisenhauer, meaning "iron hewer". The name shares its origin with the more popular Eisenhower.

Isenhour may refer to:

== People ==
- Mary Isenhour, American political strategist
- Tripp Isenhour (born 1968), American golfer

== Places ==
=== United States ===
- J. W. Isenhour Tennis Center, North Carolina
- Daniel Isenhour House and Farm, a U.S. historic building in North Carolina

== See also ==
- Eisenhauer
- W. Stine Isenhower (1927–2023), American politician
