= Vickie Sawyer =

American politician from North Carolina

Senator Vickie Sawyer
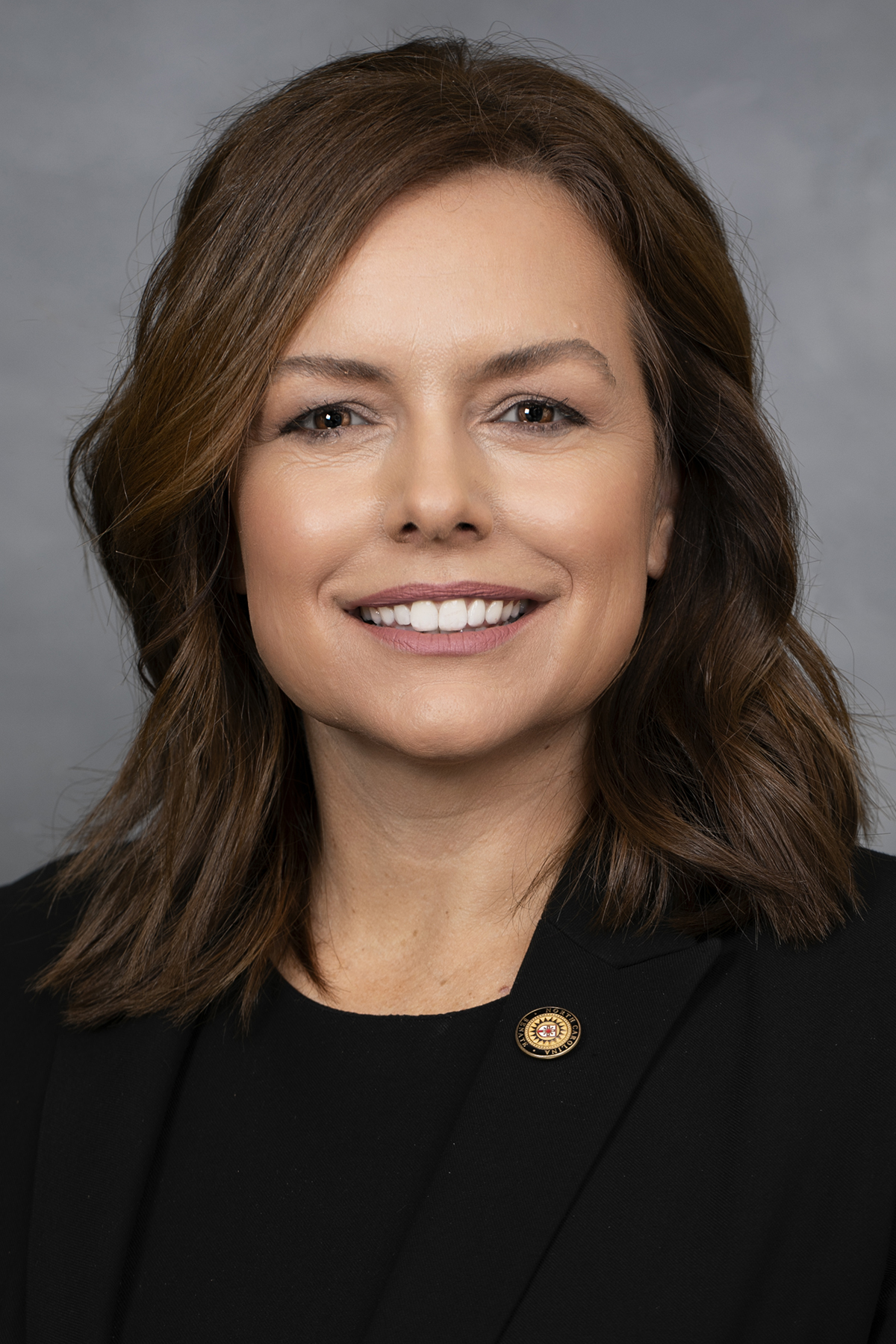

Member of the North Carolina Senate
- Incumbent
- Assumed office January 1, 2019
- Preceded by: Constituency established
- Constituency: 34th District (2017–2023); 37th District (2023–Present)
- In office August 2, 2018 – January 1, 2019
- Preceded by: David Curtis
- Succeeded by: Ted Alexander
- Constituency: 44th District

Personal details
- Born: 1974 or 1975 (age 50–51) Davidson County, North Carolina, U.S.
- Party: Republican
- Spouse: Brett
- Children: Two
- Education: University of North Carolina at Charlotte
- Occupation: Insurance agent

Victoria Burgess Sawyer (born c. 1975) is a Republican member of the North Carolina Senate. She represents the Senate's 37th district which includes Iredell and Mecklenburg Counties. Sawyer was previously appointed to serve in the Senate for District 34. Prior to that, she served in Senate District 44 from August 2, 2018 to January 2019.

== Committees and legislative activity ==
Senator Sawyer currently serves as chairman of the Senate Transportation Committee and as co-chairman of the Senate Transportation Appropriations Committee. She also serves on the Senate Finance, Commerce & Insurance, Rules and Operations, and Appropriations/Base Budget Committees. Sawyer also serves on the executive committee for the National Council of Insurance Legislators (NCOIL). In June, 2019, she was appointed to serve as chairwoman of NCOIL's Special Committee on Natural Disaster Recovery. She also serves as vice chair of the NCOIL Property-Casualty Insurance Committee.

Sawyer is involved in the following at the North Carolina General Assembly:

- The Advisory Committee on Cancer Coordination – Member
- The Advisory Committee on Performance Management – Member
- The Child Fatality Task Force – Member
- The Council of State Governments Nominating Committee - 2023 Member
- The Joint Arts Caucus – Member
- The Joint Legislative Commission on Governmental Operations – Member
- The Joint Motorsports Caucus – Member
- The Joint Women's Caucus – Co-Chair
- The Justus-Warren Heart Disease and Stroke Prevention Task Force – Co-Chair
- The Law Enforcement Caucus – Member
- The Legislative Ethics Committee – Member
- The North Carolina Leadership Forum – Member
- The Republican Women’s Caucus – Chair
- The Sportsmen's Caucus – Member
- The Wine and Grape Caucus – Co-Chair

In her home district, Sawyer serves on the board of trustees at her church, Rocky Mount United Methodist, and on the board of the Crosby Scholars of Iredell County.

In a hearing on House Bill 574, Sawyer visibly laughed as her colleagues discussed rates of suicide among youth in North Carolina.

== Personal life ==
Sawyer is a graduate of Parkland High School in Winston-Salem. She is also an alumna of UNC-Charlotte where she received a Bachelor of Arts Degree in Special Education and an initiated member of Chi Omega.

Senator Sawyer is a licensed insurance agent in North Carolina. Since 2002, she and her husband, Brett, have owned and operated Sawyer Insurance & Financial Services, based in Mooresville, North Carolina with two locations serving the Lake Norman area. They have two daughters, Sydney and Braedy.

North Carolina Senate
Preceded by David Curtis	Member of the North Carolina Senate from the 44th district 2018–2019	Succeeded by Ted Alexander
Preceded by Dan Barrett	Member of the North Carolina Senate from the 34th district 2019–2023	Succeeded by Paul Newton
Preceded by Jeff Jackson	Member of the North Carolina Senate from the 37th district 2023–Present	Incumbent
