= Eisenhower (disambiguation) =

Dwight D. Eisenhower (1890–1969) was the 34th president of the United States from 1953 to 1961.

Eisenhower may also refer to:

- Eisenhower (surname)
- the Eisenhower Doctrine
- the Eisenhower box, a Time Management strategy
- Eisenhower (album), the music album by The Slip
- USS Dwight D. Eisenhower, an aircraft carrier in the United States Navy
