= Jim Jacumin =

American politician (1936–2025)

Member of the North Carolina Senate from the 44th district
- In office January 1, 2005 – January 1, 2011
- Preceded by: Constituency Established
- Succeeded by: Warren Daniel

Personal details
- Born: November 15, 1936
- Died: November 23, 2025 (aged 89)
- Party: Republican

Jim Jacumin (November 15, 1936 – November 23, 2025) was an American politician who served in the North Carolina Senate from the 44th district from 2005 to 2011. Jacumin died on November 23, 2025, at the age of 89.

North Carolina Senate
Preceded by Austin Allran	Member of the North Carolina Senate from the 44th district 2005–2011	Succeeded by Warren Daniel
