= W. Ted Alexander =

American politician

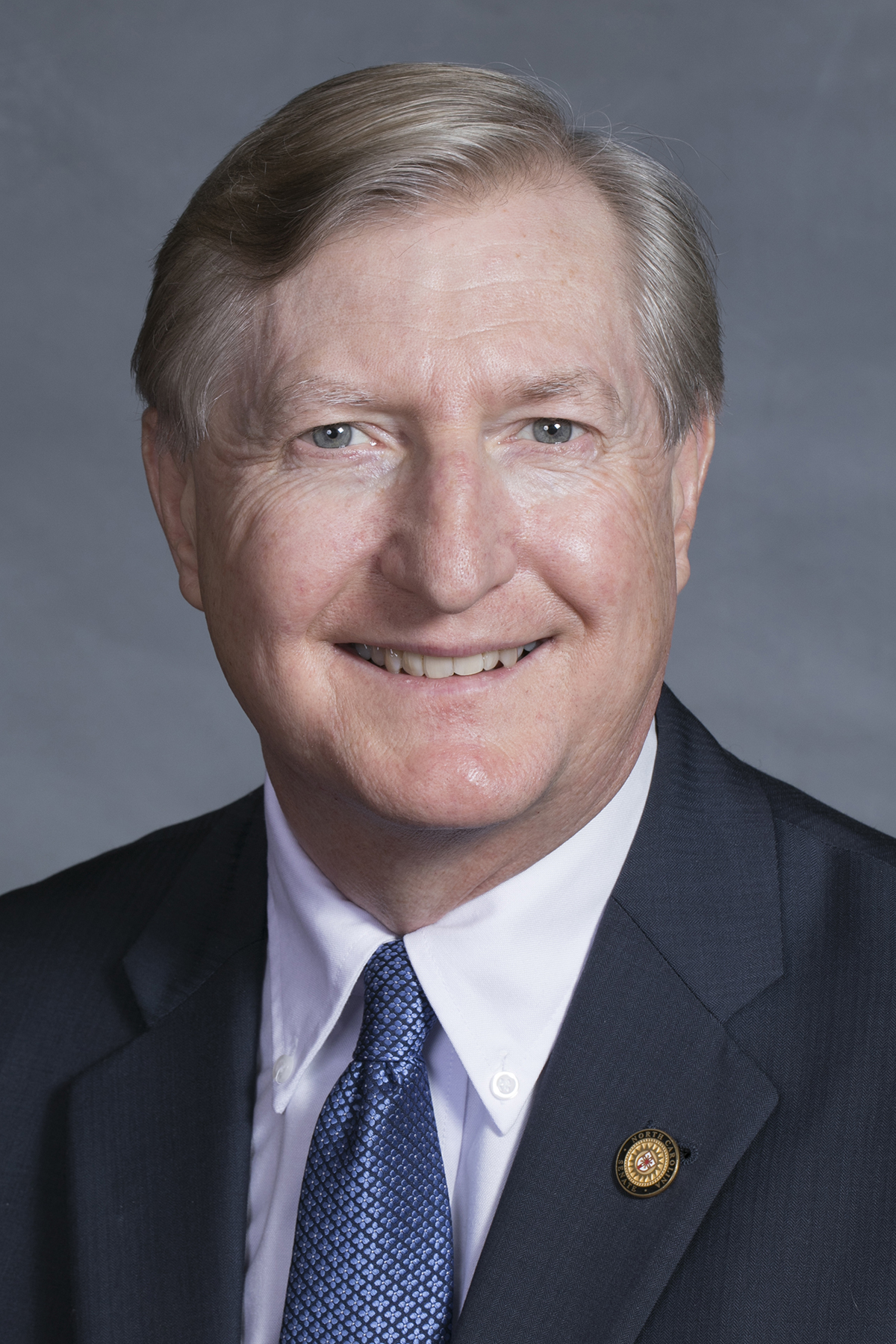

Member of the North Carolina Senate from the 44th district
- Incumbent
- Assumed office January 1, 2019
- Preceded by: Vickie Sawyer

Personal details
- Born: August 14, 1960 (age 66) Morganton, North Carolina, U.S.
- Party: Republican
- Spouse: Patti
- Children: two
- Education: University of North Carolina at Charlotte (BA); Cornell University (MA)

William Theodore Alexander III (born August 14, 1960) is an American politician.

== Early life ==
On August 14, 1960, Alexander was born in Morganton, North Carolina.

== Education ==
Alexander earned a BA degree in political science from University of North Carolina at Charlotte. Alexander earned a MA degree in Historic Preservation from Cornell University.

== Career ==
Alexander is a Republican member of the North Carolina State Senate, representing the 44th district. During his tenure in the State Senate, Alexander has been involved in measures to combat human trafficking. Alexander authored legislation to strengthen victims' rights and has led bipartisan conferences on combatting human trafficking.

Alexander has served previously as mayor of Shelby, North Carolina and as chair of the Cleveland County, North Carolina Republican Party.

North Carolina Senate
Preceded by Vickie Sawyer	Member of the North Carolina Senate from the 44th district 2019–present	Incumbent
