= Jeff Jackson (politician) =

American politician and attorney (born 1982)

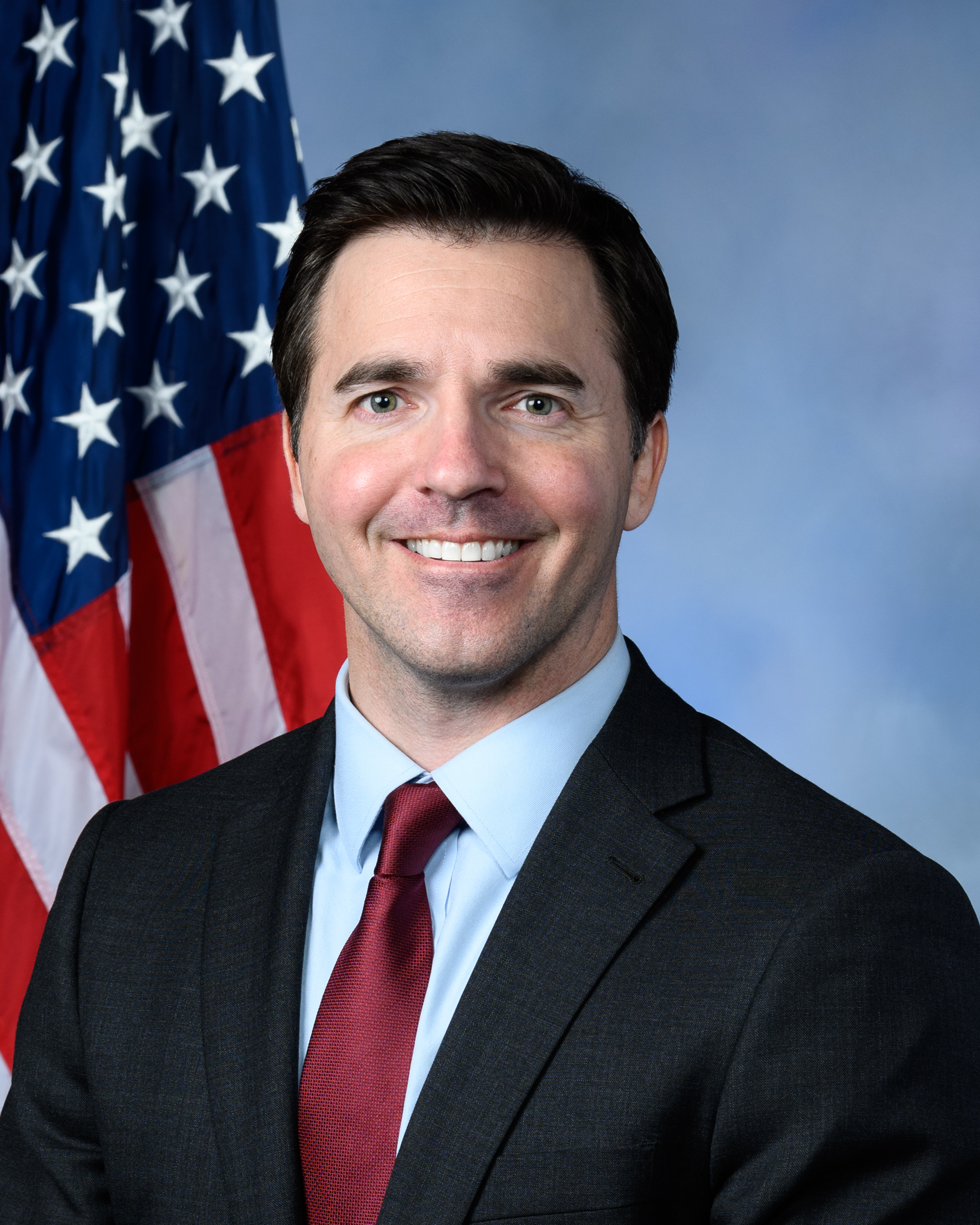
- Official portrait, 2022

52nd Attorney General of North Carolina
- Incumbent
- Assumed office January 1, 2025
- Governor: Josh Stein
- Preceded by: Josh Stein

Member of the U.S. House of Representatives from North Carolina's 14th district
- In office January 3, 2023 – December 31, 2024
- Preceded by: Constituency established
- Succeeded by: Tim Moore

Member of the North Carolina Senate from the 37th district
- In office May 6, 2014 – January 1, 2023
- Preceded by: Dan Clodfelter
- Succeeded by: Rachel Hunt (redistricted)

Personal details
- Born: Jeffrey Neale Jackson; September 12, 1982 (age 44) Miami, Florida, U.S.
- Party: Democratic
- Spouse: Marisa Bell (m. 2013)
- Children: 3
- Education: Emory University (BA, MA); University of North Carolina at Chapel Hill (JD)

Military service
- Branch/service: United States Army; United States Army Reserve; North Carolina Army National Guard
- Years of service: 2002–present
- Rank: Major
- Battles/wars: War in Afghanistan
- Jackson's voice Jackson on his congressional priorities. Recorded November 15, 2023

Jeffrey Neale Jackson (born September 12, 1982) is an American politician, attorney, and Army National Guard officer who has served as the 52nd attorney general of North Carolina since 2025. A member of the Democratic Party, he previously served as the U.S. representative for North Carolina's 14th congressional district from 2023 to 2024 and represented the 37th district in the North Carolina Senate from 2014 to 2022.

After graduating from law school, Jackson worked as an assistant district attorney in Gaston County. He was counsel at Womble Bond Dickinson. In 2002, Jackson enlisted in the United States Army Reserve and served in Kandahar Province during the War in Afghanistan. He now serves in the Judge Advocate General's Corps with the Army National Guard. In October 2023, he announced his candidacy for North Carolina attorney general after the North Carolina Legislature redrew the state's congressional districts. He was elected as the attorney general of North Carolina in November 2024. During his term in Congress, Jackson became widely known for using TikTok and other social media to explain congressional procedure to a large online audience.

== Early life and education ==
Jackson was born in Miami, Florida, on September 12, 1982, and raised in Chapel Hill, North Carolina. His father, Nathan Jackson, is a doctor, and his mother is a nurse. Jackson earned a bachelor's degree and a master's degree in philosophy from Emory University. He also earned a Juris Doctor degree from the University of North Carolina School of Law.

Jackson enlisted in the United States Army Reserve in 2002 while he was a junior at Emory. Mobilized to active duty as a corporal (E-4), he forward deployed to Afghanistan in support of Operation Enduring Freedom, assigned to a psychological operations unit. He worked as a business litigator at Womble Bond Dickinson in Charlotte. Commissioned as an officer after he graduated from college and entered law school, Jackson continues to serve in the North Carolina Army National Guard as a major in the Judge Advocate General's Corps.

Before joining the North Carolina Senate, Jackson worked as a prosecutor in Gaston County, North Carolina. He resigned upon joining the Senate, as the state constitution prohibits serving as an elected official and a prosecutor simultaneously.

== North Carolina Senate ==
When Senator Dan Clodfelter resigned in 2014 to become mayor of Charlotte, local Democratic precinct members selected Jackson from a field of four candidates to fill his State Senate seat; Jackson secured a majority with 25 of the 49 votes cast. Jackson then replaced Clodfelter as the Democratic nominee in the November 2014 general election. With no other candidates having filed to challenge Clodfelter, Jackson ran unopposed for a full two-year term. In 2016, he won a second full term, defeating Bob Diamond with 68% of the vote.

Jackson supports expanding pre-K education programs. In 2017, Jackson introduced a bill to repeal the Public Facilities Privacy & Security Act, also known as HB2.

Jackson spent several years pushing to change a North Carolina law that prevented women from legally withdrawing consent once sexual intercourse had begun. He described North Carolina was "the only state in the country where no doesn't really mean no". Legislation closing the consent loophole passed unanimously in 2019.

Jackson faced his first competitive race in 2020. His district had been significantly redrawn and was now a D+2 district, in which a Democratic candidate would be expected to win by two points. Jackson was called up for National Guard duty during the final weeks of his campaign, so his wife, Marisa, became the face of the campaign for the closing weeks. Jackson won the election with 55% of the vote.

== 2022 U.S. Senate campaign ==
Various news outlets mentioned Jackson as a potential candidate against Republican incumbent Richard Burr in North Carolina's 2016 U.S. Senate election. Jackson declined to run and Burr was reelected. He was also mentioned as a potential challenger to North Carolina's other U.S. senator, Thom Tillis, in 2020.

On January 26, 2021, Jackson announced he would run to replace Burr, who was retiring, in North Carolina's 2022 United States Senate election. He announced that he would run a "100-county campaign", visiting all of North Carolina's 100 counties. His campaign raised over $500,000 within 48 hours of his announcement. Jackson raised more than $900,000 in the third quarter of 2021, and in total more than $3 million from the time he announced his candidacy in January 2021. On December 16, 2021, Jackson announced that he would suspend his campaign and endorsed Cheri Beasley.

== United States Representative ==
=== 2022 election ===
Following redistricting, Jackson announced his candidacy for the U.S. House of Representatives in the state's new 14th congressional district on February 25, 2022. The district includes most of the southern half of Mecklenburg County, as well as eastern Gaston County. Jackson won the general election, defeating Republican nominee Pat Harrigan 58% to 42%.

=== Tenure ===
During both the electoral process and his tenure as a congressman, Jackson has used his TikTok and other social media accounts to keep the public updated about policy issues and the functioning of the United States Congress. His first video to garner national attention was an account of the January 2023 speaker of the United States House of Representatives election. He created a video detailing the national response to the collapse of Silicon Valley Bank, assuring his viewers that depositors at the bank would be reimbursed without relying on taxpayer funds. He has also spoken against outrage journalism, drawing from his experiences with politicians who employ "fake anger" and how the news media employs it to attract audiences.

On December 31, 2024, Jackson resigned early from Congress to become the North Carolina attorney general on January 1, 2025.

=== Committee memberships ===
United States House Committee on Armed Services

- Subcommittee on Intelligence and Special Operations
- Subcommittee on Tactical Air and Land Forces

United States House Committee on Science, Space, and Technology.

- Subcommittee on Space and Aeronautics
- Subcommittee on Investigations and Oversight

=== Caucus memberships ===
- New Democrat Coalition
- The Equality Caucus

== North Carolina Attorney General ==
The Republican-controlled state legislature approved new district maps that placed Jackson's home in Charlotte in a new, heavily Republican 14th district stretching from south Charlotte to the Foothills. In response, Jackson announced he would run for state attorney general. The seat became open when incumbent Josh Stein announced that he would run for governor in 2024. He won the Democratic primary on March 5, 2024 with 54% of the vote. He faced Republican Dan Bishop in the November election; Jackson won the election 51% to 49%. Jackson took office as North Carolina attorney general on January 1, 2025.

== Personal life ==
Jackson is married to Marisa Jackson and lives in Charlotte. He has two sons and a daughter, including his stepson from Marisa's previous relationship. In 2020, Jackson was named one of Charlotte Magazine's Charlotteans of the Year.

Jackson is a Presbyterian.

== Electoral history ==
=== North Carolina Senate ===
2014 North Carolina Senate 37th district general election
| Party | Candidate | Votes | % |
|---|---|---|---|
| Democratic | Jeff Jackson (incumbent) | 31,392 | 100.00% |
| Total votes | | 31,392 | 100.00% |
| Democratic hold | | | |

2016 North Carolina Senate 37th district general election
| Party | Candidate | Votes | % |
|---|---|---|---|
| Democratic | Jeff Jackson (incumbent) | 57,804 | 67.94% |
| Republican | Bob Diamond | 27,279 | 32.06% |
| Total votes | | 85,083 | 100.00% |
| Democratic hold | | | |

2018 North Carolina Senate 37th district general election
| Party | Candidate | Votes | % |
|---|---|---|---|
| Democratic | Jeff Jackson (incumbent) | 52,261 | 78.05% |
| Republican | Nora Trotman | 13,395 | 20.01% |
| Constitution | Stuart Andrew Collins | 1,301 | 1.94% |
| Total votes | | 66,957 | 100.00% |
| Democratic hold | | | |

2020 North Carolina Senate 37th district general election
| Party | Candidate | Votes | % |
|---|---|---|---|
| Democratic | Jeff Jackson (incumbent) | 64,562 | 54.99% |
| Republican | Sonja P. Nichols | 48,507 | 41.32% |
| Libertarian | Jeff Scott | 4,336 | 3.69% |
| Total votes | | 117,405 | 100.00% |
| Democratic hold | | | |

=== U.S. House of Representatives ===
2022 North Carolina's 14th congressional district election
Primary election
| Party | Candidate | Votes | % |
|---|---|---|---|
| Democratic | Jeff Jackson | 34,724 | 86.12% |
| Democratic | Ram Mammadov | 5,598 | 13.88% |
| Total votes | | 40,322 | 100.00% |
General election
| Democratic | Jeff Jackson | 148,738 | 57.71% |
| Republican | Pat Harrigan | 109,014 | 42.29% |
| Total votes | | 257,752 | 100.00% |
| Democratic win (new seat) | | | |

=== North Carolina Attorney General ===
2024 North Carolina Attorney General election
| Party | Candidate | Votes | % |
|---|---|---|---|
| Democratic | Jeff Jackson | 370,666 | 54.83% |
| Democratic | Satana Deberry | 223,835 | 33.11% |
| Democratic | Tim Dunn | 81,492 | 12.06% |
| Total votes | | 675,993 | 100.00% |
General election
| Democratic | Jeff Jackson | 2,874,960 | 51.43% |
| Republican | Dan Bishop | 2,715,411 | 48.57% |
| Total votes | | 5,590,371 | 100.00% |
| Democratic hold | | | |

U.S. House of Representatives
| New constituency | Member of the U.S. House of Representatives from North Carolina's 14th congressional district 2023–2024 | Succeeded by Tim Moore |
Party political offices
| Preceded by Josh Stein | Democratic nominee for Attorney General of North Carolina; 2024 | Most recent |
Legal offices
| Preceded by Josh Stein | Attorney General of North Carolina; 2025–present | Incumbent |
U.S. order of precedence (ceremonial)
| Preceded by Madison Cawthorn as Former U.S. Representative | Order of precedence of the United States as Former U.S. Representative | Succeeded by Wiley Nickel as Former U.S. Representative |
