= Eisenhower (surname) =

Eisenhower is a surname derived from the German word Eisenhauer, meaning "iron hewer". People with the surname include:

- Anne Eisenhower (1949–2022), prominent interior designer, daughter of John Eisenhower
- David Eisenhower (born 1948), historian, son of John Eisenhower
- Dwight D. Eisenhower (1890–1969), five-star general and 34th president of the United States
- Earl D. Eisenhower (1898–1968), American electrical engineer and politician, brother of President Dwight D. Eisenhower
- Edgar N. Eisenhower (1889–1971), American lawyer, brother of President Dwight D. Eisenhower
- Ida Stover Eisenhower (1862–1946), mother of President Dwight D. Eisenhower
- Jennie Eisenhower (born 1978), actress, daughter of David and Julie Eisenhower
- John Eisenhower (1922–2013), U.S. Army officer, second son of President Dwight D. Eisenhower and Mamie Eisenhower
- Julie Nixon Eisenhower (born 1948), daughter of Richard Nixon and wife of David Eisenhower
- Mamie Eisenhower (1896–1979), wife of President Dwight D. Eisenhower
- Mary Jean Eisenhower (born 1955), international charity worker, daughter of John Eisenhower
- Milton S. Eisenhower (1899–1985), American University President, brother of President Dwight D. Eisenhower
- Susan Eisenhower (born 1951), author and expert on international security, daughter of John Eisenhower

== See also ==
- USS Dwight D. Eisenhower, a warship named after President Eisenhower
- W. Stine Isenhower (1927–2022), American politician
- Eisenhauer
- Isenhour
