= David L. Curtis =

American politician

Member of the North Carolina Senate from the 44th district
- In office January 1, 2013 – June 30, 2018
- Preceded by: Chris Carney (Redistricting)
- Succeeded by: Vickie Sawyer

Personal details
- Born: February 4, 1947 (age 79) Mooresville, North Carolina, U.S.
- Party: Republican

David L. Curtis (born February 4, 1947) is an American politician who served in the North Carolina Senate from the 44th district from 2013 to 2018.

He was defeated in the primary election in May 2018.

Rather than wait until the end of his term, Curtis resigned effective the end of the legislative term in June.

North Carolina Senate
Preceded by Warren Daniel	Member of the North Carolina Senate from the 44th district 2013–2018	Succeeded by Vickie Sawyer
