= Austin M. Allran =

American politician from North Carolina

Austin Allran
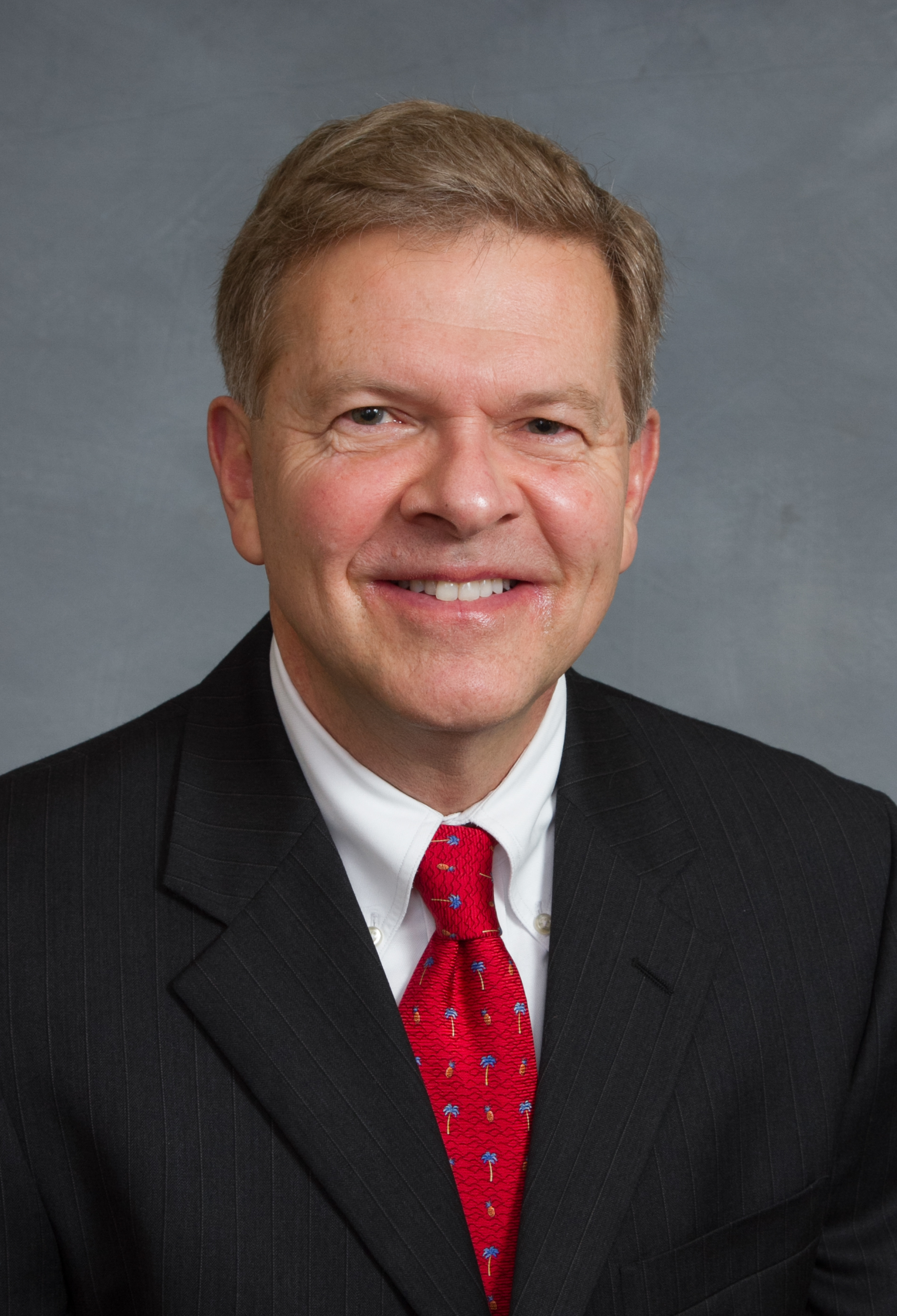
- Official portrait, 2013

Member of the Catawba County Commission
- Incumbent
- Assumed office December 2020
- Preceded by: Dan A. Hunsucker

Member of the North Carolina Senate
- In office January 1, 1987 – January 1, 2015
- Preceded by: Cass Ballenger
- Succeeded by: Andy Wells
- Constituency: 26th district (1987–2003); 44th district (2003–2005); 42nd district (2005–2015)

Member of the North Carolina House of Representatives
- In office January 1, 1981 – January 1, 1987
- Preceded by: Carl William Rullman
- Succeeded by: Walter Stine Isenhower
- Constituency: 37th district (1981–1983); 45th district (1983–1987)

Personal details
- Born: Austin Murphy Allran; December 13, 1951 (age 74) Hickory, North Carolina, U.S.
- Party: Republican
- Education: Duke University (BA); Southern Methodist University (JD); North Carolina State University (MA)
- Occupation: lawyer

Austin Murphy Allran (born December 13, 1951) is a former Republican member of the North Carolina General Assembly representing the state's forty-second Senate district, including constituents in Iredell and Catawba counties. He currently serves in a local capacity as a Catawba County Commissioner (December 2020 – present). An attorney from Hickory, North Carolina, Allran served for twelve terms in the state Senate. He was Vice-Chairman of the Agriculture/Environment/Natural Resources Committee and the Judiciary II (Criminal) Committee. He was also a member of four other committees - Education/Higher Education, Finance, Health Care, and Ways and Means.

Allran was born in Hickory, North Carolina. He graduated from Hickory High School in 1970 and then earned degrees in English and history from Duke University. Allran attended law school at Southern Methodist University, earning his degree in 1978. He married Judy Mosbach on September 27, 1980. They have two children, Elizabeth and Catherine. In 1981, Allran was elected to the North Carolina House of Representatives and in 1986 to the North Carolina Senate. He served as Republican minority whip during the 1995–1996 session. In March 2005, Allran called for the game of Solitaire to be erased from the Microsoft Windows computers of state employees in his North Carolina constituency, claiming that such a move would save millions of dollars and improve productivity due to the working time lost while state employees play the game.

North Carolina House of Representatives
Preceded by Carl William Rullman	Member of the North Carolina House of Representatives from the 37th district 1981–1983; Served alongside: Julius Reid Poovey	Succeeded by James Erwin Lambeth Jr. John Wesley Varner; Betsy Lane Cochrane
Preceded by Jeff Hailen Enloe Jr.	Member of the North Carolina House of Representatives from the 45th district 1983–1987; Served alongside: Julius Reid Poovey, Doris Rogers Huffman	Succeeded by Walter Stine Isenhower
North Carolina Senate
Preceded by Cass Ballenger	Member of the North Carolina Senate from the 26th district 1987–2003	Succeeded by Phil Berger
Preceded by Constituency established	Member of the North Carolina Senate from the 44th district 2003–2005	Succeeded by Jim Jacumin
Preceded by James Forrester	Member of the North Carolina Senate from the 42nd district 2005–2015	Succeeded by Andy Wells
