= Nico Eisenhauer =

German ecologist

Nico Eisenhauer (born 22 February 1980, in Lindenfels, Germany) is a German biologist, soil ecologist and professor for experimental interaction ecology at Leipzig University.

== Scientific career ==
Nico Eisenhauer obtained his diploma in animal ecology at the Darmstadt University of Technology in 2005, and then was awarded a doctorate in 2008 from Darmstadt University of Technology with a thesis "Earthworms in a plant diversity gradient: Direct and indirect effects on plant competition and establishment." From 2008 to 2010 he worked as Postdoc in the Jena Experiment at the Darmstadt University of Technology and Georg August University Göttingen, from 2010 to 2012 a Postdoc at the University of Minnesota and then at the Technical University of Munich where he was an Emmy Noether group leader. He then habilitated at the Georg August University Göttingen in Ecology and Zoology.

From 2012 to 2014, he worked as associate professor for Terrestrial Ecology at the Friedrich Schiller University Jena. Since 2014, he has been a full professor for Experimental Interaction Ecology at the German Centre for Integrative Biodiversity Research (iDiv) Halle-Jena-Leipzig and Leipzig University. Since 2015 he is Speaker of the Research Unit “Jena Experiment,” funded by the German Research Foundation. He is also Head of the iDiv Ecotron and the MyDiv experiment, as well as founding member of the "Soil BON" consortium. His main research focus is on reasons for and ecosystem consequences of changes in biodiversity.

== Prizes and awards ==
- 2026: Top Scientist (discipline: Ecology & Evolution), Ecology and Evolution 2026, Research.com
- 2025 Highly Ranked Scholar 2025 in Biodiversity (rank within the top 0.05%), ScholarGPS®
- 2025 IMS Visiting Professor at Institute for Multidisciplinary Sciences, Yokohama National University, Japan (2025-2028)
- 2025 Leipzig University Supervisor Award 2025
- 2025 ERC project ECOWORM assessed as Scientific Breakthrough (defined as a revolutionary work that led to deep change in existing paradigms or new methods opening a new stream of research) by Scientific Department of the European Research Council Executive Agency (ERCEA)
- 2025 Top 2% Scientist (Subfield: Ecology; global rank 95), by Stanford University & Elsevier
- 2025 Top Scientist (discipline: Ecology & Evolution), Ecology and Evolution Leader Award 2025, Research.com
- 2024 Guest Professorship at the Institute of the Urban Environment, Chinese Academy of Sciences, Xiamen, China
- 2024 Best Research Environment Award 2024 for the Experimental Interaction Ecology Group by Die Junge Akademie of the Berlin-Brandenburg Academy of Sciences and Humanities (BBAW) and the German National Academy of Sciences Leopoldina
- 2024 Top 2% Scientist (Subfield: Ecology; global rank 117), by Stanford University & Elsevier
- 2024 Top Scientist (discipline: Ecology & Evolution), Ecology and Evolution Leader Award 2024, Research.com
- 2023 PIFI Distinguished Scientist Award of CAS President’s International Fellowship Initiative
- 2023 iDiv Supervisor Award 2023 by iDiv
- 2023 Award for outstanding engagement in PhD supervision by Leipzig University
- 2023: Elected Member of the National Academy of Sciences Leopoldina, the national academy of Germany, Section: Agricultural and Nutritional Sciences
- 2023: Short-listed for Hamburger Wissenschaftspreis on “One Health” by the Akademie der Wissenschaften in Hamburg
- 2023: Top Scientist (discipline: Ecology & Evolution), Ecology and Evolution Leader Award 2023, Research.com
- 2023: Honorary award by the city of Fürth (Odenwald) for scientific achievements
- 2022: Top Scientist (discipline: Ecology & Evolution; #394 worldwide, #25 in Germany), Research.com
- 2021: World Expert in Soil (top 0.1%), Expertscape
- 2021: Reuters list of the world’s top climate scientists, Reuters
- 2021: Gottfried Wilhelm Leibniz Prize, German Research Foundation
- 2020: Selected Alexander von Humboldt Scout of the Henriette Herz-Scouting-Programm
- 2020: Highly Cited Researcher 2020, Clarivate
- 2016: ERC Starting Grant by the European Research Council
- 2014: “Top 40 under 40”, magazine Capital (“Best of Germany”)
- 2014: Heinz Maier-Leibnitz Prize, German Research Foundation
- 2012: Emmy-Noether scholarship, German Research Foundation
- 2010: Postdoc research scholarship, German Research Foundation
- 2004: Research scholarship, German Academic Exchange Service (DAAD)

== Editorial board ==
- Since 2026: Founding Senior Editor at Current Biodiversity
- Since 2021: Advisory Editorial Board at Journal of Sustainable Agriculture and Environment
- Since 2019: Editor-in-Chief at Soil Organisms
- 2014–2018: Editor-in-Chief at Pedobiologia – Journal of Soil Ecology
- 2012–2013: Subject Editor at Plant and Soil
- 2011–2013: Subject Editor at Biodiversity and Conservation

== Selected publications ==
- Google scholar
- Eisenhauer N, Bonn A, Guerra CA (2019) Recognizing the quiet extinction of invertebrates. Nature Communications 10: Article number 50.
- Eisenhauer N, Dobies T, Cesarz S, Hobbie SE, Meyer RJ, Worm K, Reich PB. (2013) Plant diversity effects on soil food webs are stronger than those of elevated CO2 and N deposition in a long-term grassland experiment. PNAS 110:6889–6894. According to Google Scholar, this publication has been cited 132 times
- Eisenhauer N and Guerra CA (2019) Global maps of soil nematode worms. Nature 572:187–188.
- Eisenhauer N*, Hines J*, Isbell F, van der Plas F, Hobbie SE, Kazanski CE, Lehmann A, Liu M, Lochner A, Rillig MC, Vogel A, Worm K, Reich PB (2018) Plant diversity maintains multiple soil functions in future environments. eLife 7:e41228. *shared first authorship
- Isbell F, Craven D, 34 co-authors, Eisenhauer N (2015) Biodiversity increases the resistance of ecosystem productivity to climate extremes. Nature 626:574–577. According to Google Scholar, this publication has been cited 423 times
- Phillips HRP, Guerra CA, 137 co-authors, Cameron EK*, Eisenhauer N* (2019) Global distribution of earthworm diversity. Science, accepted. *shared senior authorship.
- Reich PB, Tilman D, Isbell F, Mueller K, Hobbie SE, Flynn DFB, Eisenhauer N (2012) Impacts of biodiversity loss escalate through time as redundancy fades. Science 336:589–592. According to Google Scholar, this publication has been cited 529 times
- Scherber C, Eisenhauer N, 37 co-authors, Tscharnke T (2010) Bottom-up effects of plant diversity on biotic interactions in a biodiversity experiment. Nature 468:553–556. According to Google Scholar, this publication has been cited 588 times
- Schwarz B, Barnes AD*, Thakur MP, Brose U, Ciobanu M, Reich PB, Rich RL, Rosenbaum B, Stefanski A, Eisenhauer N* (2017) Warming alters energetic structure and function but not resilience of soil food webs. Nature Climate Change 7:895–900. *shared senior authorship.
- Thakur MP, Reich PB, Hobbie SE, Stefanski A, Rich R, Rice KE, Eddy WC, Eisenhauer N (2018) Reduced feeding activity of soil detritivores under warmer and drier conditions. Nature Climate Change 8:75–78.
