= North Carolina's 44th Senate district =

American legislative district

North Carolina's 44th State Senate district
Senator
Ted Alexander; R–Shelby
- Demographics: 78% White; 12% Black; 6% Hispanic; 1% Asian; 3% Multiracial
- Population (2023): 206,904

North Carolina's 44th Senate district is one of 50 districts in the North Carolina Senate. It has been represented by Republican Ted Alexander since 2019.

== Geography ==
Since 2019, the district has included all of Cleveland and Lincoln counties, as well as part of Gaston County. The district overlaps with the 97th, 110th, and 111th state house districts.

== District officeholders since 2003 ==
Senator	Party	Dates	Notes	Counties
District created January 1, 2003.				2003–2005; All of Burke County. Part of Catawba County.
Austin Allran (Hickory)	Republican	January 1, 2003 – January 1, 2005	Redistricted from the 26th district. Redistricted to the 42nd district.	2003–2005; All of Burke County. Part of Catawba County.
Jim Jacumin (Connelly Springs)	Republican	January 1, 2005 – January 1, 2011	Retired.	2005–2013; All of Burke and Caldwell counties.
Warren Daniel (Morganton)	Republican	January 1, 2011 – January 1, 2013	Redistricted to the 46th district.	2005–2013; All of Burke and Caldwell counties.
David Curtis (Denver)	Republican	January 1, 2013 – June 30, 2018	Lost re-nomination and resigned.	2013–2019; All of Lincoln County. Parts of Iredell and Gaston counties.
Vacant		June 30, 2018 - August 2, 2018		2013–2019; All of Lincoln County. Parts of Iredell and Gaston counties.
Vickie Sawyer (Mooresville)	Republican	August 2, 2018 – January 1, 2019	Appointed to finish Curtis's term. Re-elected in the 34th district.	2013–2019; All of Lincoln County. Parts of Iredell and Gaston counties.
Ted Alexander (Shelby)	Republican	January 1, 2019 – Present		2019–Present; All of Lincoln and Cleveland counties. Part of Gaston County.

== Election results ==
=== 2024 ===
North Carolina Senate 44th district general election, 2024
Party	Candidate	Votes	%
Republican	Ted Alexander (incumbent)	81,809	72.50%
Democratic	Henry Herzberg	31,033	27.50%
Total votes		112,842	100%
Republican hold			

=== 2022 ===
North Carolina Senate 44th district general election, 2022
Party	Candidate	Votes	%
Republican	Ted Alexander (incumbent)	58,525	100%
Total votes		58,525	100%
Republican hold			

=== 2020 ===
North Carolina Senate 44th district general election, 2020
Party	Candidate	Votes	%
Republican	Ted Alexander (incumbent)	73,513	70.78%
Democratic	David Lee Lattimore	30,354	29.22%
Total votes		103,867	100%
Republican hold			

=== 2018 ===
North Carolina Senate 44th district Republican primary election, 2018
Party	Candidate	Votes	%
Republican	Ted Alexander	5,523	44.37%
Republican	David Curtis (incumbent)	4,554	36.59%
Republican	Martin Oakes	2,370	19.04%
Total votes		12,447	100%

North Carolina Senate 44th district general election, 2018
Party	Candidate	Votes	%
Republican	Ted Alexander	46,861	68.85%
Democratic	David Lee Lattimore	21,204	31.15%
Total votes		68,065	100%
Republican hold			

=== 2016 ===
North Carolina Senate 44th district Republican primary election, 2016
Party	Candidate	Votes	%
Republican	David Curtis (incumbent)	15,267	51.06%
Republican	Chris Carney	14,635	48.94%
Total votes		29,902	100%

North Carolina Senate 44th district general election, 2016
Party	Candidate	Votes	%
Republican	David Curtis (incumbent)	71,114	77.30%
Libertarian	Nic Haag	20,881`	22.70%
Total votes		91,995	100%
Republican hold			

=== 2014 ===
North Carolina Senate 44th district general election, 2014
Party	Candidate	Votes	%
Republican	David Curtis (incumbent)	45,722	100%
Total votes		45,722	100%
Republican hold			

=== 2012 ===
North Carolina Senate 44th district Republican primary election, 2012
Party	Candidate	Votes	%
Republican	Chris Carney (incumbent)	8,865	35.06%
Republican	David Curtis	8,613	34.06%
Republican	Karen Ray	7,809	30.88%
Total votes		25,287	100%

North Carolina Senate 44th district Republican primary run-off election, 2012
Party	Candidate	Votes	%
Republican	David Curtis	4,539	59.17%
Republican	Chris Carney (incumbent)	3,132	40.83%
Total votes		7,671	100%

North Carolina Senate 44th district general election, 2012
Party	Candidate	Votes	%
Republican	David Curtis	60,167	65.85%
Democratic	Ross Bulla	31,197	34.15%
Total votes		91,364	100%
Republican hold			

=== 2010 ===
North Carolina Senate 44th district Democratic primary election, 2010
Party	Candidate	Votes	%
Democratic	Beth Jones	2,951	83.48%
Democratic	Heath Wynn	584	16.52%
Total votes		3,535	100%

North Carolina Senate 44th district general election, 2010
Party	Candidate	Votes	%
Republican	Warren Daniel	26,314	58.87%
Democratic	Beth Jones	17,300	38.71%
Libertarian	Richard C. Evey	1,083	2.42%
Total votes		44,697	100%
Republican hold			

=== 2008 ===
North Carolina Senate 44th district Democratic primary election, 2008
Party	Candidate	Votes	%
Democratic	Jim Cates	11,463	63.99%
Democratic	Danny Hefner	6,452	36.01%
Total votes		17,915	100%

North Carolina 44th district general election, 2008
Party	Candidate	Votes	%
Republican	Jim Jacumin (incumbent)	41,320	57.88%
Democratic	Jim Cates	27,782	38.92%
Libertarian	Richard C. Evey	2,287	3.20%
Total votes		71,389	100%
Republican hold			

=== 2006 ===
North Carolina 44th district general election, 2006
Party	Candidate	Votes	%
Republican	Jim Jacumin (incumbent)	26,683	100%
Total votes		26,683	100%
Republican hold			

=== 2004 ===
North Carolina Senate 44th district Democratic primary election, 2004
Party	Candidate	Votes	%
Democratic	Richard Cornwell Avery	2,809	57.09%
Democratic	Dan DeHart	2,111	42.91%
Total votes		4,920	100%

North Carolina Senate 44th district Republican primary election, 2004
Party	Candidate	Votes	%
Republican	Jim Jacumin	5,511	62.20%
Republican	George Robinson	3,349	37.80%
Total votes		8,860	100%

North Carolina 44th district general election, 2004
Party	Candidate	Votes	%
Republican	Jim Jacumin	38,567	61.54%
Democratic	Richard Cornwell Avery	24,100	38.46%
Total votes		62,667	100%
Republican win (new seat)			

=== 2002 ===
North Carolina Senate 44th district Republican primary election, 2002
Party	Candidate	Votes	%
Republican	Austin Allran (incumbent)	5,728	63.04%
Republican	William R. "Bill" McDonald III	3,358	36.96%
Total votes		9,086	100%

North Carolina Senate 44th district general election, 2002
Party	Candidate	Votes	%
Republican	Austin Allran (incumbent)	30,278	100%
Total votes		30,278	100%
Republican hold			
