= Bill Rabon =

American politician (born 1951)

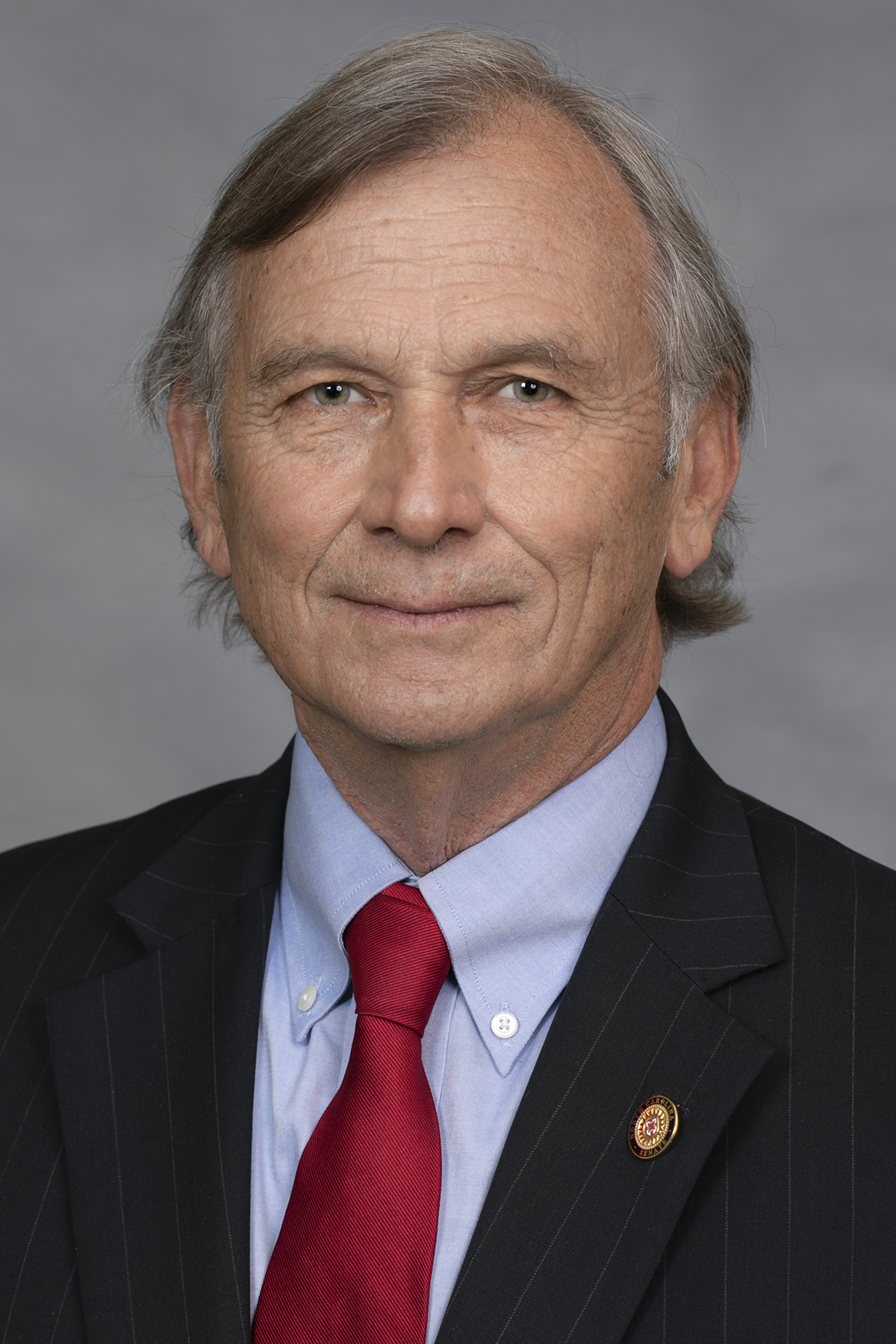

Member of the North Carolina Senate from the 8th district
- Incumbent
- Assumed office January 1, 2011
- Preceded by: R. C. Soles Jr.

Personal details
- Born: William Peter Rabon; July 6, 1951 (age 75)
- Party: Republican
- Education: North Carolina State University; University of Georgia
- Occupation: veterinarian

William Peter Rabon (born July 6, 1951) is a Republican member of the North Carolina State Senate and a veterinarian. He is the Chairman of the Rules and Operations of the Senate committee, the Select Committee on Nominations, and the Finance Committee.

Rabon has degrees from North Carolina State University and the University of Georgia.
