= North Carolina's 37th Senate district =

American legislative district

North Carolina's 37th State Senate district
Senator
Vickie Sawyer; R–Mooresville
- Demographics: 75% White; 11% Black; 8% Hispanic; 3% Asian; 1% Other; 3% Multiracial
- Population (2023): 221,274

North Carolina's 37th Senate district is one of 50 districts in the North Carolina Senate. It has been represented by Republican Vickie Sawyer since 2023.

== Geography ==
Since 2023, the district has covered all of Iredell County, as well as part of Mecklenburg County. The district overlaps with the 84th, 89th, 95th, and 98th state house districts.

== District officeholders since 1993 ==
Senator	Party	Dates	Notes	Counties
District created January 1, 1993.				1993–2003; All of Rutherford County. Part of Cleveland County.
J. Ollie Harris (Kings Mountain)	Democratic	January 1, 1993 – January 1, 1995	Retired.	1993–2003; All of Rutherford County. Part of Cleveland County.
Dennis Davis (Lattimore)	Republican	January 1, 1995 – January 1, 1997	Lost re-election.	1993–2003; All of Rutherford County. Part of Cleveland County.
Walter Dalton (Rutherfordton)	Democratic	January 1, 1997 – January 1, 2003	Redistricted to the 46th district.	1993–2003; All of Rutherford County. Part of Cleveland County.
Dan Clodfelter (Charlotte)	Democratic	January 1, 2003 – April 8, 2014	Redistricted from the 40th district. Resigned to become Mayor of Charlotte.	2003–2023; Part of Mecklenburg County.
Vacant		April 8, 2014 – May 6, 2014		2003–2023; Part of Mecklenburg County.
Jeff Jackson (Charlotte)	Democratic	May 6, 2014 – January 1, 2023	Appointed to finish Clodfelter's term. Redistricted to the 42nd district and retired to run for Congress.	2003–2023; Part of Mecklenburg County.
Vickie Sawyer (Mooresville)	Republican	January 1, 2023 – Present		2023–Present; All of Iredell County. Part of Mecklenburg County.

== Election results ==
=== 2024 ===
North Carolina Senate 37th district general election, 2024
Party	Candidate	Votes	%
Republican	Vickie Sawyer (incumbent)	82,832	64.73%
Democratic	Kate Compton Barr	45,129	35.27%
Total votes		127,961	100%
Republican hold			

=== 2022 ===
North Carolina Senate 37th district Republican primary election, 2022
Party	Candidate	Votes	%
Republican	Vickie Sawyer (incumbent)	15,969	82.40%
Republican	Tom Fyler	3,411	17.60%
Total votes		19,380	100%

North Carolina Senate 37th district general election, 2022
Party	Candidate	Votes	%
Republican	Vickie Sawyer (incumbent)	63,763	100%
Total votes		63,763	100%
Republican hold			

=== 2020 ===
North Carolina Senate 37th district general election, 2020
Party	Candidate	Votes	%
Democratic	Jeff Jackson (incumbent)	64,562	54.99%
Republican	Sonja P. Nichols	48,507	41.32%
Libertarian	Jeff Scott	4,336	3.69%
Total votes		117,405	100%
Democratic hold			

=== 2018 ===
North Carolina Senate 37th district general election, 2018
Party	Candidate	Votes	%
Democratic	Jeff Jackson (incumbent)	52,261	78.05%
Republican	Nora Trotman	13,395	20.01%
Constitution	Stuart Andrew Collins	1,301	1.94%
Total votes		66,957	100%
Democratic hold			

=== 2016 ===
North Carolina Senate 37th district general election, 2016
Party	Candidate	Votes	%
Democratic	Jeff Jackson (incumbent)	57,804	67.94%
Republican	Bob Diamond	27,279	32.06%
Total votes		85,083	100%
Democratic hold			

=== 2014 ===
North Carolina Senate 37th district general election, 2014
Party	Candidate	Votes	%
Democratic	Jeff Jackson (incumbent)	31,392	100%
Total votes		31,392	100%
Democratic hold			

=== 2012 ===
North Carolina Senate 37th district general election, 2012
Party	Candidate	Votes	%
Democratic	Dan Clodfelter (incumbent)	51,376	66.98%
Republican	Michael Alan Vadini	25,325	33.02%
Total votes		76,701	100%
Democratic hold			

=== 2010 ===
North Carolina Senate 37th district Republican primary election, 2010
Party	Candidate	Votes	%
Republican	C. Morgan Edwards	1,850	61.12%
Republican	Vince Coscia	1,177	38.88%
Total votes		3,027	100%

North Carolina Senate 37th district general election, 2010
Party	Candidate	Votes	%
Democratic	Dan Clodfelter (incumbent)	24,956	61.45%
Republican	C. Morgan Edwards	15,656	38.55%
Total votes		40,612	100%
Democratic hold			

=== 2008 ===
North Carolina Senate 37th district general election, 2008
Party	Candidate	Votes	%
Democratic	Dan Clodfelter (incumbent)	48,608	67.84%
Republican	Vince Coscia	30,315	28.35%
Libertarian	Rusty Sheridan	2,733	3.81%
Total votes		71,656	100%
Democratic hold			

=== 2006 ===
North Carolina Senate 37th district general election, 2006
Party	Candidate	Votes	%
Democratic	Dan Clodfelter (incumbent)	20,018	100%
Total votes		20,018	100%
Democratic hold			

=== 2004 ===
North Carolina Senate 37th district general election, 2004
Party	Candidate	Votes	%
Democratic	Dan Clodfelter (incumbent)	40,902	100%
Total votes		40,902	100%
Democratic hold			

=== 2002 ===
North Carolina Senate 37th district general election, 2002
Party	Candidate	Votes	%
Democratic	Dan Clodfelter (incumbent)	23,003	100%
Total votes		23,003	100%
Democratic hold			

=== 2000 ===
North Carolina Senate 37th district general election, 2000
Party	Candidate	Votes	%
Democratic	Walter Dalton (incumbent)	26,374	54.76%
Republican	Scott Neisler	21,792	45.24%
Total votes		48,166	100%
Democratic hold			
