= Warren Daniel =

American politician

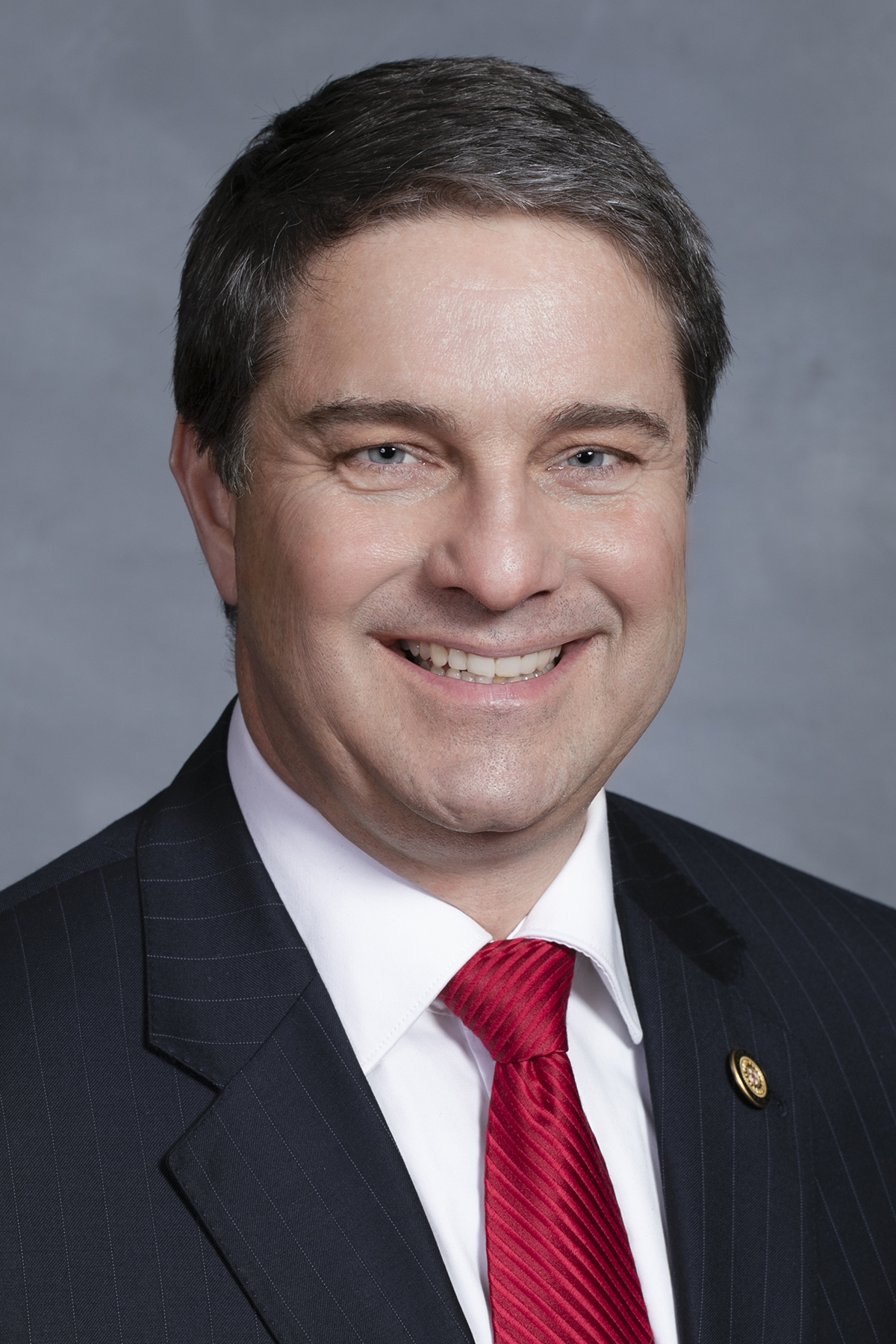

Member of the North Carolina Senate
- Incumbent
- Assumed office January 1, 2011
- Preceded by: Jim Jacumin (44th); Wes Westmoreland (46th)
- Constituency: 44th district (2011–2013); 46th district (2013–present)

Personal details
- Born: December 15, 1968 (age 57) Morganton, North Carolina, U.S.
- Party: Republican
- Education: United States Military Academy (BS); University of North Carolina, Chapel Hill (JD)

Warren Daniel (born December 15, 1968) is an American politician who has served in the North Carolina Senate since 2011. He is a graduate of Freedom High School and the United States Military Academy.
