= W. Stine Isenhower =

American politician (1927–2022)

Stine Isenhower
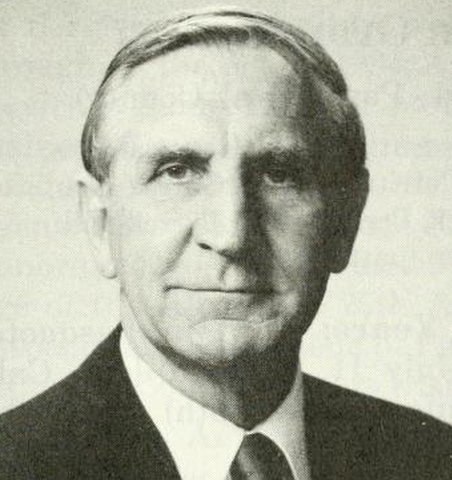

Member of the North Carolina House of Representatives from the 45th district
- In office January 1, 1987 – January 1, 1993 Serving with Doris Rogers Huffman
- Preceded by: Austin Allran
- Succeeded by: Cherie Berry; Charles Richard Preston

Personal details
- Born: April 10, 1927 Conover, North Carolina, U.S.
- Died: December 31, 2022 (aged 95) Hickory, North Carolina, U.S.
- Party: Republican
- Spouse: Carolyn Vaughn (m. 1951; died 2013)
- Education: Lenoir Rhyne College (BS)

Walter Stine Isenhower (April 27, 1927 – December 31, 2022) was an American politician in the state of North Carolina.

A native of Conover, North Carolina, Isenhower is an alumnus of Lenoir-Rhyne College (now Lenoir-Rhyne University) and a former insurance agent. He is also a former corporal in the United States Army.

Isenhower served in the North Carolina House of Representatives from 1986 to 1992 for the 45th District, as a Republican. The district encompassed parts of Catawba County and Burke County.

Isenhower was married to Carolyn Vaughn from 1951 until her death in 2013. He was active in the local Lions Club, Chamber of Commerce, YMCA, Boy Scouts and Red Cross organizations. Isenhower was also a volunteer firefighter. He was awarded the Daughters of the American Revolution's Medal of Honor in 2006 for his service to the community. He was affectionately known as "Mr. Catawba County" in his hometown of Conover.

Isenhower died on December 31, 2022, at the age of 95.

North Carolina House of Representatives
Preceded by Austin Allran	Member of the North Carolina House of Representatives from the 45th district 1987–1993; Served alongside: Doris Rogers Huffman	Succeeded by Cherie Berry; Charles Richard Preston
