= North Carolina Senate =

Upper house of the North Carolina General Assembly

Coordinates: 35°46′59.53″N 78°38′20.24″W

- North Carolina General Assembly
- Seal of the North Carolina Senate

Type
- Type: Upper house
- Term limits: None

History
- New session started: January 1, 2025

Leadership
- President: Rachel Hunt (D) since January 1, 2025
- President pro tempore: Phil Berger (R) since January 26, 2011
- Majority Leader: Michael V. Lee (R) since April 1, 2025
- Minority Leader: Sydney Batch (D) since January 1, 2025

Structure
- Seats: 50
- Political groups: Majority: Republican (30); Minority: Democratic (20)
- Length of term: 2 years

Elections
- Last election: November 3, 2026 (50 seats)
- Next election: November 7, 2028 (50 seats)

Meeting place
- Senate chamber North Carolina Legislative Building; Raleigh, North Carolina, United States

Website
- www.ncleg.gov/Senate

Constitution
- North Carolina Constitution

The North Carolina Senate is the upper chamber of the North Carolina General Assembly, which along with the North Carolina House of Representatives—the lower chamber—comprises the state legislature of North Carolina. The Senate has 50 members, and the term of office for each senator is two years.

The Senate's prerogatives and powers are similar to those of the other house, the House of Representatives. Its members do, however, represent districts that are larger than those of their colleagues in the House. The president of the Senate is the lieutenant governor of North Carolina, but the lieutenant governor has very limited powers and only votes to break a tie. Before the office of lieutenant governor was created in 1868, the Senate was presided over by a "speaker." After the 1988 election of James Carson Gardner, the first Republican lieutenant governor since Reconstruction, Democrats in control of the Senate shifted most of the power held by the lieutenant governor to the senator who is elected president pro tempore (or pro-tem). The president pro tempore appoints members to standing committees of the Senate, and holds great sway over bills.

According to the state constitution, the Senate is also the "Court for the Trial of Impeachments". The House of Representatives has the power to impeach state officials, after which the Senate holds an impeachment trial, as in the federal system. If the governor or lieutenant governor is the official who has been impeached, the chief justice of the North Carolina Supreme Court presides.

== History ==
During the Reconstruction era, African Americans served in the state senate. By 1874, four African Americans, all Republicans, were in the body, in which Democrats had already regained a large majority of 38 to 12. In 1920, Loula Roberts Platt became the first woman to run for a seat in the state senate.

== Qualifications ==
The qualifications to be a senator are found in the state Constitution: "Each Senator, at the time of his election, shall be not less than 25 years of age, shall be a qualified voter of the State, and shall have resided in the State as a citizen for two years and in the district for which he is chosen for one year immediately preceding his election."

== 2025–26 composition ==
Affiliation	Party (shading indicates majority caucus)		Total	Vacant
Affiliation	Republican	Democratic	Total	Vacant
End of (2021–22) legislature	28	22	50	0
Beginning of previous (2023–24) legislature	30	20	50	0
End of previous (2023–24) legislature	30	20	50	0
Beginning of current (2025–26) legislature	30	20	50	0
Latest voting share	60%	40%		

=== Leadership ===
North Carolina Senate officers
Position	Name	Party
President Pro Tempore	Phil Berger	Republican
Deputy President Pro Tempore	Ralph Hise	Republican
Majority Leader	Michael V. Lee	Republican
Majority Whip	Amy Galey	Republican
Majority Whip	Todd Johnson	Republican
Joint Majority Caucus Leader	Carl Ford	Republican
Minority Leader	Sydney Batch	Democratic
Minority Whip	Jay Chaudhuri	Democratic
Minority Caucus Secretary	Julie Mayfield	Democratic

=== Membership ===
District	Name	Party	Residence	Counties	Start
1st	Jerry Tillett	Republican		Bertie, Northampton, Hertford, Gates, Perquimans, Pasquotank, Camden, Currituck, Tyrrell, Dare	2026 (Note: Originally appointed to fill the remainder of an unexpired term.)
2nd	Norman Sanderson	Republican	Minnesott Beach	Warren, Halifax, Martin, Chowan, Washington, Hyde, Pamlico, Carteret	2012
3rd	Bob Brinson	Republican	New Bern	Lenoir, Craven, Beaufort	2024
4th	Buck Newton	Republican	Wilson	Wilson, Wayne, Greene	2022 (2010–2016)
5th	Kandie Smith	Democratic	Greenville	Edgecombe, Pitt	2022
6th	Michael Lazzara	Republican	Jacksonville	Onslow	2020
7th	Michael Lee	Republican	Wilmington	New Hanover (part)	2020 (2014–2018)
8th	Bill Rabon	Republican	Southport	Columbus, Brunswick, New Hanover (part)	2010
9th	Brent Jackson	Republican	Autryville	Bladen, Sampson (part), Pender, Duplin, Jones	2010
10th	Benton Sawrey	Republican	Clayton	Johnston	2022
11th	Lisa Stone Barnes	Republican	Spring Hope	Vance, Franklin, Nash	2020
12th	Jim Burgin	Republican	Angier	Lee, Harnett, Sampson (part)	2018
13th	Lisa Grafstein	Democratic	Raleigh	Wake (part)	2022
14th	Dan Blue	Democratic	Raleigh	Wake (part)	2009
15th	Jay Chaudhuri	Democratic	Raleigh	Wake (part)	2016
16th	Gale Adcock	Democratic	Cary	Wake (part)	2022
17th	Sydney Batch	Democratic	Holly Springs	Wake (part)	2021
18th	Haseeb Fatmi	Democratic	Wake Forest	Granville, Wake (part)	2026
19th	Val Applewhite	Democratic	Fayetteville	Cumberland (part)	2022
20th	Natalie Murdock	Democratic	Durham	Chatham, Durham (part)	2020
21st	Tom McInnis	Republican	Pinehurst	Moore, Cumberland (part)	2014
22nd	Sophia Chitlik	Democratic	Durham	Durham (part)	2024
23rd	Jonah Garson	Democratic	Chapel Hill	Caswell, Person, Orange	2026
24th	Danny Britt	Republican	Lumberton	Hoke, Scotland, Robeson	2016
25th	Amy Galey	Republican	Burlington	Alamance, Randolph (part)	2020
26th	Phil Berger	Republican	Eden	Rockingham, Guilford (part)	2000
27th	Michael Garrett	Democratic	Greensboro	Guilford (part)	2018
28th	Gladys Robinson	Democratic	Greensboro	Guilford (part)	2010
29th	Dave Craven	Republican	Asheboro	Randolph (part), Montgomery, Richmond, Anson, Union (part)	2020
30th	Steve Jarvis	Republican	Lexington	Davie, Davidson	2020
31st	Dana Caudill Jones	Republican	Kernersville	Stokes, Forsyth (part)	2024
32nd	Paul Lowe	Democratic	Winston-Salem	Forsyth (part)	2015
33rd	Carl Ford	Republican	China Grove	Rowan, Stanly	2018
34th	Chris Measmer	Republican	Concord	Cabarrus (part)	2025
35th	Todd Johnson	Republican	Monroe	Cabarrus (part), Union (part)	2018
36th	Eddie Settle	Republican	Elkin	Alexander, Wilkes, Surry, Yadkin	2022
37th	Vickie Sawyer	Republican	Mooresville	Iredell, Mecklenburg (part)	2018
38th	Mujtaba Mohammed	Democratic	Charlotte	Mecklenburg (part)	2018
39th	DeAndrea Salvador	Democratic	Charlotte	Mecklenburg (part)	2020
40th	Joyce Waddell	Democratic	Charlotte	Mecklenburg (part)	2014
41st	Caleb Theodros	Democratic	Charlotte	Mecklenburg (part)	2024
42nd	Woodson Bradley	Democratic	Charlotte	Mecklenburg (part)	2024
43rd	Brad Overcash	Republican	Belmont	Gaston (part)	2022
44th	Ted Alexander	Republican	Shelby	Cleveland, Lincoln, Gaston (part)	2018
45th	Mark Hollo	Republican	Conover	Catawba, Caldwell (part)	2024
46th	Warren Daniel	Republican	Morganton	Burke, McDowell, Buncombe (part)	2010
47th	Ralph Hise	Republican	Spruce Pine	Alleghany, Ashe, Watauga, Caldwell (part), Avery, Mitchell, Yancey, Madison, Haywood (part)	2010
48th	Tim Moffitt	Republican	Hendersonville	Henderson, Polk, Rutherford	2022
49th	Julie Mayfield	Democratic	Asheville	Buncombe (part)	2020
50th	Kevin Corbin	Republican	Franklin	Haywood (part), Transylvania, Jackson, Swain, Macon, Graham, Cherokee, Clay	2020

== Coat of arms ==
Coat of arms of North Carolina Senate
Granted 2005 Crest Issuant from a Coronet of a Noble of the former Province of Carolina Or a Cap of Liberty Gules raised upon a Pole Or between two Cornucopiae in saltire Argent replenished proper Escutcheon Argent on a Cross between four Escutcheons bases inwards Gules four Escutcheons bases also inwards Argent Supporters On each side an Aborigine of North Carolina as depicted by John White in the reign of Queen Elizabeth the First that on the dexter a Warrior supporting with his exterior hand a Long Bow and holding an Arrow girded at his back a Quiver that on the sinister a Woman holding in her exterior hand a Gourd all proper Motto ESSE QVAM VIDERI

== See also ==
- North Carolina House of Representatives
- List of North Carolina state legislatures
