= North Carolina's 20th Senate district =

American legislative district

North Carolina's 20th State Senate district
Senator
Natalie Murdock; D–Durham
- Demographics: 53% White; 26% Black; 13% Hispanic; 4% Asian; 1% Other; 4% Multiracial
- Population (2023): 205,431

North Carolina's 20th Senate district is one of 50 districts in the North Carolina Senate. It has been represented by Democrat Natalie Murdock since 2020.

== Geography ==
Since 2023, the district has included all of Chatham County, as well as part of Durham County. The district overlaps with the 29th, 31st, and 54th house districts.

== District officeholders since 1973 ==
=== Multi-member district ===
Senator	Party	Dates	Notes	Senator	Party	Dates	Notes	Counties
Hamilton Horton Jr. (Winston-Salem)	Republican	January 1, 1973 – January 1, 1975	Redistricted from the 22nd district.	Harry Bagnal (Winston-Salem)	Republican	January 1, 1973 – January 1, 1975	Redistricted from the 22nd district.	1973–1983; All of Forsyth County.
E. Lawrence Davis (Winston-Salem)	Democratic	January 1, 1975 – January 1, 1979		Carl Totherow (Winston-Salem)	Democratic	January 1, 1975 – January 1, 1979		1973–1983; All of Forsyth County.
Marvin Ward (Winston-Salem)	Democratic	January 1, 1979 – January 1, 1995	Lost re-election.	Anne Bagnal (Winston-Salem)	Republican	January 1, 1979 – January 1, 1981		1973–1983; All of Forsyth County.
Marvin Ward (Winston-Salem)	Democratic	January 1, 1979 – January 1, 1995	Lost re-election.	John Cavanagh Jr. (Winston-Salem)	Republican	January 1, 1981 – January 1, 1983		1973–1983; All of Forsyth County.
Marvin Ward (Winston-Salem)	Democratic	January 1, 1979 – January 1, 1995	Lost re-election.	Richard Barnes (Winston-Salem)	Democratic	January 1, 1983 – January 1, 1985		1983–2003; Most of Forsyth County.
Marvin Ward (Winston-Salem)	Democratic	January 1, 1979 – January 1, 1995	Lost re-election.	Ted Kaplan (Lewisville)	Democratic	January 1, 1985 – January 1, 1995	Lost re-election.	1983–2003; Most of Forsyth County.
Hamilton Horton Jr. (Winston-Salem)	Republican	January 1, 1995 – January 1, 2003	Redistricted to the 31st district.	James Mark McDaniel (Pfafftown)	Republican	January 1, 1995 – January 1, 1999	Lost re-election.	1983–2003; Most of Forsyth County.
Hamilton Horton Jr. (Winston-Salem)	Republican	January 1, 1995 – January 1, 2003	Redistricted to the 31st district.	Linda Garrou (Winston-Salem)	Democratic	January 1, 1999 – January 1, 2003	Redistricted to the 32nd district.	1983–2003; Most of Forsyth County.

=== Single-member district ===
Senator	Party	Dates	Notes	Counties
Jeanne Hopkins Lucas (Durham)	Democratic	January 1, 2003 – March 9, 2007	Redistricted from the 13th district. Died.	2003–2013; Part of Durham County.
Vacant		March 9, 2007 – April 18, 2007		2003–2013; Part of Durham County.
Floyd McKissick Jr. (Durham)	Democratic	April 18, 2007 – January 7, 2020	Appointed to finish Lucas's term. Resigned.	2003–2013; Part of Durham County.
Floyd McKissick Jr. (Durham)	Democratic	April 18, 2007 – January 7, 2020	Appointed to finish Lucas's term. Resigned.	2013–2019; All of Granville County. Part of Durham County.
Floyd McKissick Jr. (Durham)	Democratic	April 18, 2007 – January 7, 2020	Appointed to finish Lucas's term. Resigned.	2019–2023; Part of Durham County.
Vacant		January 7, 2020 – January 14, 2020		2019–2023; Part of Durham County.
Mickey Michaux (Durham)	Democratic	January 14, 2020 – March 31, 2020	Appointed to continue McKissick's term. Resigned.	2019–2023; Part of Durham County.
Vacant		March 31, 2020 – April 29, 2020		2019–2023; Part of Durham County.
Natalie Murdock (Durham)	Democratic	April 29, 2020 – Present	Appointed to finish McKissick's term.	2019–2023; Part of Durham County.
Natalie Murdock (Durham)	Democratic	April 29, 2020 – Present	Appointed to finish McKissick's term.	2023–Present; All of Chatham County. Part of Durham County.

== Election results ==
=== 2024 ===
North Carolina Senate 20th district general election, 2024
Party	Candidate	Votes	%
Democratic	Natalie Murdock (incumbent)	90,128	72.28%
Republican	Christopher Partain	34,570	27.72%
Total votes		124,698	100%
Democratic hold			

=== 2022 ===
North Carolina Senate 20th district general election, 2022
Party	Candidate	Votes	%
Democratic	Natalie Murdock (incumbent)	64,550	72.83%
Republican	Alvin Reed	24,085	27.17%
Total votes		88,635	100%
Democratic hold			

=== 2020 ===
North Carolina Senate 20th district Democratic primary election, 2020
Party	Candidate	Votes	%
Democratic	Natalie Murdock	24,508	45.23%
Democratic	Pierce Freelon	20,054	37.01%
Democratic	Gray Ellis	9,629	17.77%
Total votes		54,191	100%

North Carolina Senate 20th district general election, 2020
Party	Candidate	Votes	%
Democratic	Natalie Murdock (incumbent)	102,732	83.61%
Republican	John Tarantino	20,143	16.39%
Total votes		122,875	100%
Democratic hold			

=== 2018 ===
North Carolina Senate 20th district general election, 2018
Party	Candidate	Votes	%
Democratic	Floyd McKissick Jr. (incumbent)	74,205	83.52%
Republican	Tom Stark	12,309	13.85%
Libertarian	Jared Erickson	2,331	2.62%
Total votes		88,845	100%
Democratic hold			

=== 2016 ===
North Carolina Senate 20th district general election, 2016
Party	Candidate	Votes	%
Democratic	Floyd McKissick Jr. (incumbent)	71,865	81.60%
Libertarian	Barbara Howe	16,202	18.40%
Total votes		88,067	100%
Democratic hold			

=== 2014 ===
North Carolina Senate 20th district general election, 2014
Party	Candidate	Votes	%
Democratic	Floyd McKissick Jr. (incumbent)	46,482	100%
Total votes		46,482	100%
Democratic hold			

=== 2012 ===
North Carolina Senate 20th district Democratic primary election, 2012
Party	Candidate	Votes	%
Democratic	Floyd McKissick Jr. (incumbent)	24,208	82.25%
Democratic	Ralph Madison McKinney Jr.	5,225	17.75%
Total votes		29,433	100%

North Carolina Senate 20th district general election, 2012
Party	Candidate	Votes	%
Democratic	Floyd McKissick Jr. (incumbent)	75,673	100%
Total votes		75,673	100%
Democratic hold			

=== 2010 ===
North Carolina Senate 20th district general election, 2010
Party	Candidate	Votes	%
Democratic	Floyd McKissick Jr. (incumbent)	38,309	73.11%
Republican	John Tarantino	14,092	26.89%
Total votes		52,401	100%
Democratic hold			

=== 2008 ===
North Carolina Senate 20th district Democratic primary election, 2008
Party	Candidate	Votes	%
Democratic	Floyd McKissick Jr. (incumbent)	32,313	77.20%
Democratic	Ryan O'Neal Echoles	9,542	22.80%
Total votes		41,855	100%

North Carolina Senate 20th district general election, 2008
Party	Candidate	Votes	%
Democratic	Floyd McKissick Jr. (incumbent)	64,178	74.58%
Republican	Ken Chandler	19,666	22.55%
Libertarian	David C. Rollins	3,377	3.87%
Total votes		87,221	100%
Democratic hold			

=== 2006 ===
North Carolina Senate 20th district general election, 2006
Party	Candidate	Votes	%
Democratic	Jeanne Hopkins Lucas (incumbent)	26,760	100%
Total votes		26,760	100%
Democratic hold			

=== 2004 ===
North Carolina Senate 20th district general election, 2004
Party	Candidate	Votes	%
Democratic	Jeanne Hopkins Lucas (incumbent)	55,050	90.24%
Libertarian	Ray Ubinger	5,953	9.76%
Total votes		61,003	100%
Democratic hold			

=== 2002 ===
North Carolina Senate District 20th district general election, 2002
Party	Candidate	Votes	%
Democratic	Jeanne Hopkins Lucas (incumbent)	30,216	89.31%
Libertarian	Jonathan Guze	3,617	10.69%
Total votes		33,833	100%
Democratic hold			

=== 2000 ===
North Carolina Senate 20th district general election, 2000
Party	Candidate	Votes	%
Democratic	Linda Garrou (incumbent)	60,149	35.65%
Republican	Hamilton Horton Jr. (incumbent)	59,929	35.52%
Republican	Jeannie A. Metcalf	48,666	28.84%
Total votes		168,744	100%
Democratic hold			
Republican hold			
