= Dana Jones =

Dana Jones may refer to:

- Dana Jones (basketball) (born 1972), American basketball player
- Dana Jones (politician) (born 1976), American politician from Maryland
- Dana Caudill Jones, member-elect of the North Carolina Senate
- Dana Jones (sprinter), American sprinter, winner of the 1991 4 × 400 meter relay at the NCAA Division I Indoor Track and Field Championships
