= Doris Funnye Innis =

American writer and activist (1933-2015)

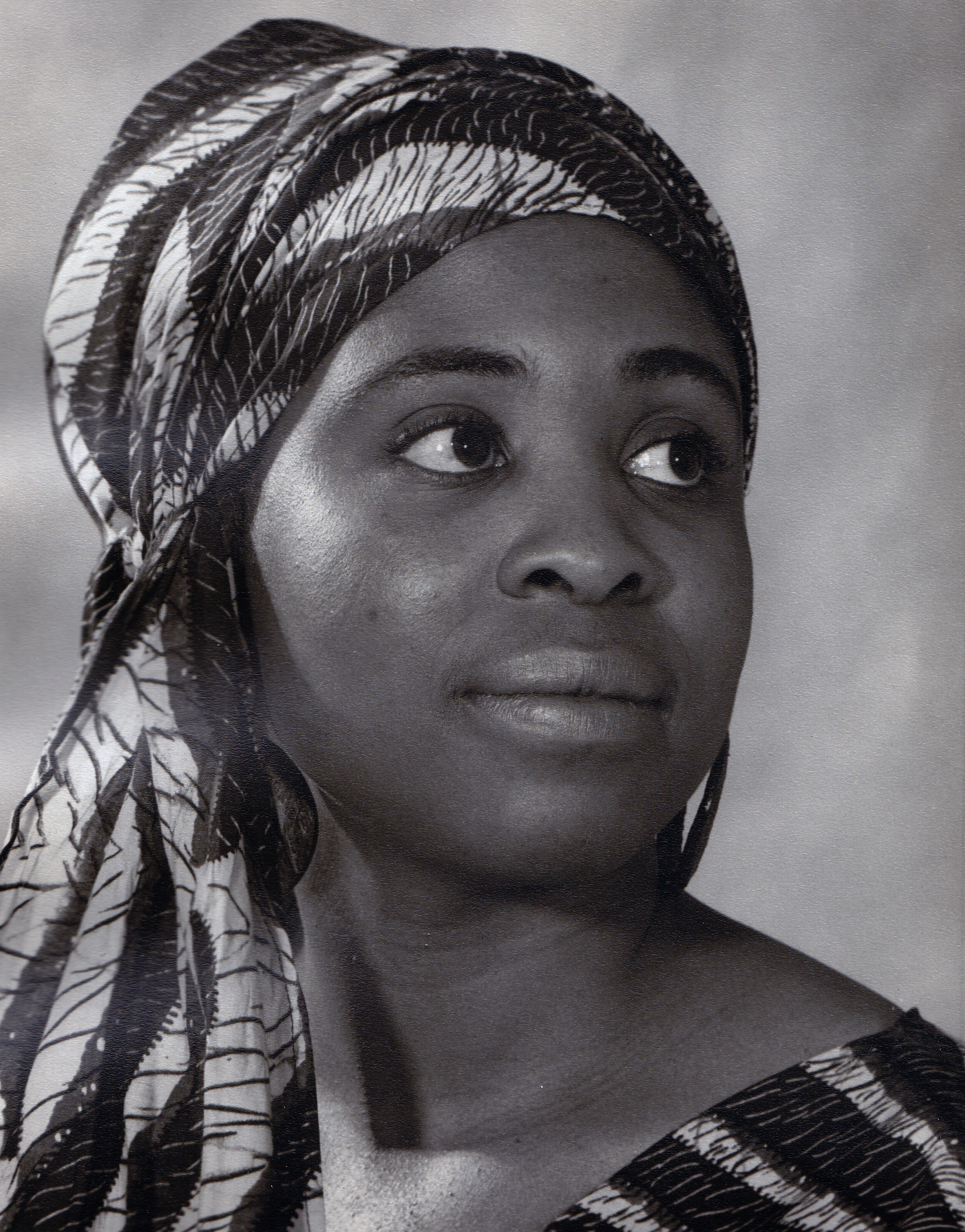
- Born: Doris Valdena Funnye; February 26, 1933; Georgetown, South Carolina, United States
- Died: December 8, 2015 (aged 82); New York City, United States
- Education: South Carolina State College (B.A.), New York University (M.A.), (M.A.Ed.)
- Occupations: Editor, writer, journalist, educator
- Notable work: Profiles in Black
- Spouse: Roy Innis (div. 2003)
- Children: Kimathi Innis

Doris Valdena Funnye Innis (February 26, 1933 – December 8, 2015) was an American writer, editor and educator, significantly in the area of civil rights. She was the editor of the Congress of Racial Equality (CORE) publications Rights and Reviews and CORE Magazine in the early 1970s and again in the 1980s.

She was the sister of former CORE chairman Clarence Funnye, and the former wife of CORE National chairman Roy Innis.

== Early life ==
Doris Valdena Funnye was born on February 26, 1933, in Georgetown, South Carolina, the daughter of Susan (née Green) and John A. Funnye, a minister. Both parents were descendants of the Gullah people of South Carolina. She was raised in a Southern Baptist family and was the only sister of three brothers. One of her brothers, Clarence Delmonte Funnye, an Air Force veteran of the Korean War, would later become the Chairman of the Congress of Racial Equality from 1964 to 1965.

Doris Funnye attended Howard High School in Georgetown, and later obtained degrees from South Carolina State College, as well as two master's degrees from New York University, one in English (B.A.) and one in Education (B.A.Ed.).

== CORE years ==
Doris Funnye followed her brother Clarence to the Congress of Racial Equality as a volunteer and organizer for the civil rights organization. Not long after entering CORE she met a young chemist named Roy Innis, and the two were married in 1965. Roy Innis often stated anecdotally, "Doris was always busy with this place called CORE. So I followed her there. They tried to kick me out saying meetings were for CORE staff members only. So, I became a staff member."

Though Roy Innis entered CORE through Doris Funnye as a volunteer, he usurped her brother Clarence as Chairman of CORE helping to issue in a new phase of Black Nationalism. The friction between Roy Innis and Clarence Funnye put a strain on Doris in terms of her relationships with her older brother and spouse.

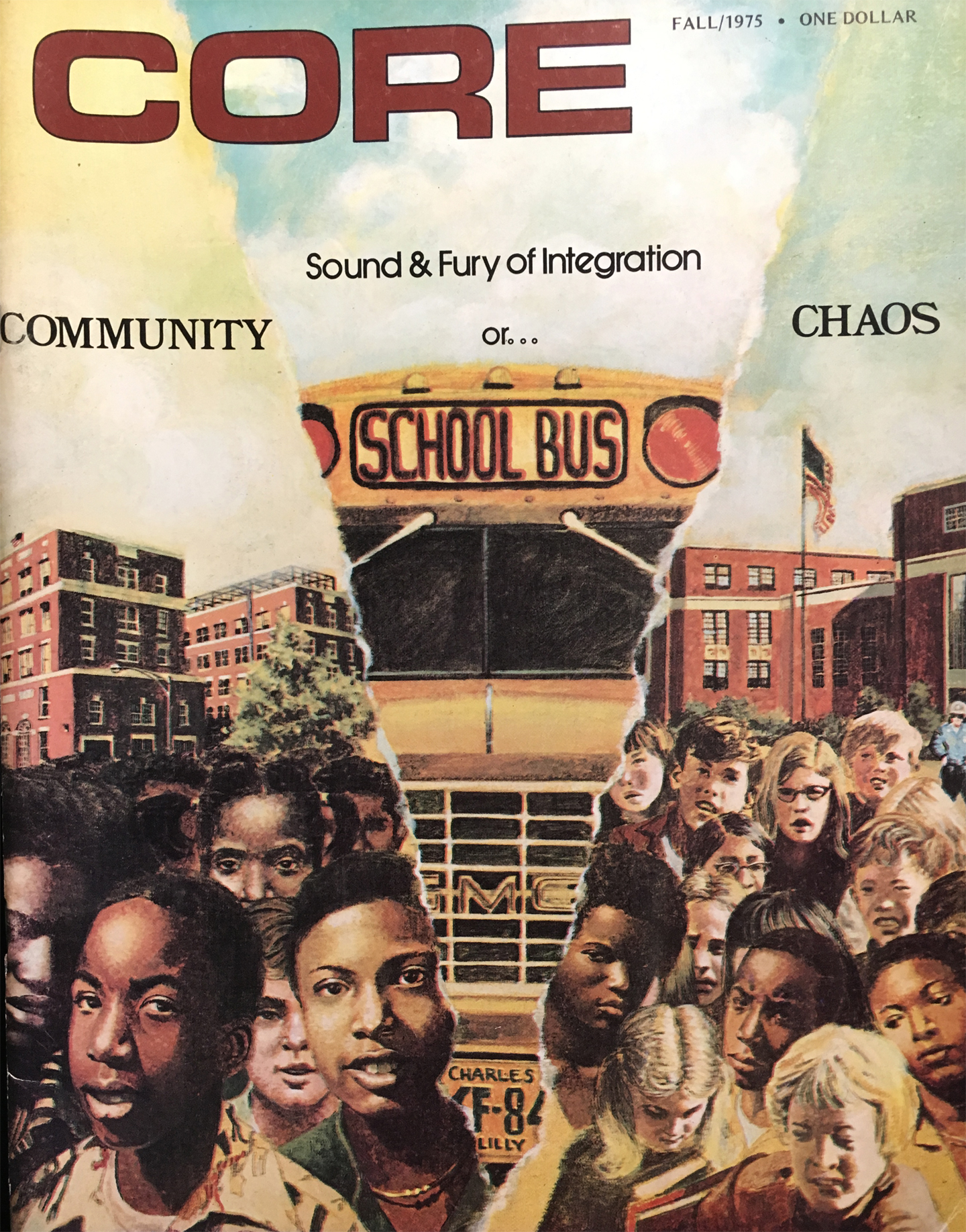
Congress of Racial Equality Magazine, Fall 1975 - feature on integration and education

By 1966 Doris Innis was the editor of the CORE publication Rights and Reviews, which featured writings from Julian Bond, Roy Innis and then national chairman Floyd McKissick. The magazine often featured artwork from artists such as Osmond Tyner and contributions from satirist-cartoonist Jules Feiffer.

While she was at CORE, Innis was a contributing writer to Life magazine, writing a review of the 1968 CBS News series, Of Black America.

In the 1970s Innis became the editor of CORE Magazine. The in-house published magazine focused on Black empowerment, featuring articles on international and national politics, education, economics, arts, culture, literature, sports and media. Innis often interviewed noteworthy African American females of the time, such as Eleanor Holmes Norton and Congresswoman Shirley Chisholm. On the occasion of interviewing Chisolm, Innis used the pen name Penda Saxby.

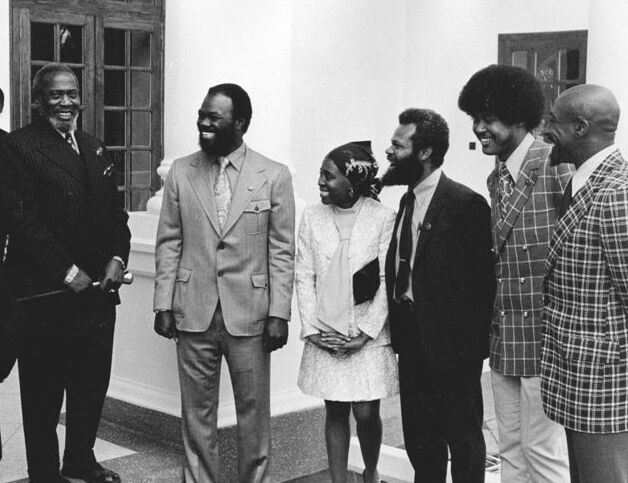
Roy Innis, Jomo Kenyatta, and Doris Funnye Innis in Kenya, circa 1970

Innis accompanied her husband Roy on many official CORE delegations, notably, delegations to Africa in 1971 and 1973 where she met with leaders such as Kenya's Jomo Kenyatta and Julius Nyerere of Tanzania. In 1971 she led the Women in the Black Society Workshop which covered topics such as the treatment of Black women by Black men, women's liberation, birth control, and inter-racial relationships. In attendance were Shirley Chisholm and Nina Simone who received lifetime CORE memberships at the event.

Innis headed the CORE delegation to Mexico City for the first World Conference on Women in 1975 (dubbed International Women's Year by the United Nations).

In 1976, Innis edited the book, Profiles in Black, a compilation book of 100 biographical sketches of "Living Black Unsung Heroes". The book featured African Americans of noteworthy accomplishments in arts, politics, engineering, media and music. Opera singer Claudia Lindsey (a close friend of Innis) was featured in the book.

== Break from CORE ==
By the late 1970s a strained relationship with Roy Innis made it increasingly difficult for Doris to actively work within the offices of the Congress of Racial Equality. By 1980, she began to distance herself from CORE. However, she continued to assist Roy in his urban education programs, such as the CORE Community School in the Bronx, New York as a senior administrator at the school.

In 1981 Doris Innis was a contributor to The New York Times, writing an article about the tradition of the church dinner with African-American churches in Harlem.

Innis began work as an editor with the magazine Woman's World. Following a scandal surrounding Roy Innis, Doris was called into the head office, where she was asked if she had any relation to him. Though the two were separated by this time, she informed her employer that Roy was still her husband. Not wanting to bring unwanted attention to their publication, Woman's World terminated Doris Innis' employment. The termination, compounded with her conflicts with Roy Innis, was emotionally devastating to Doris, affecting her confidence to seek work with high-profile publishers from then on.

== Post-CORE years ==
Doris Innis used the 1980s to compose herself and concentrate on raising her only child, Kimathi. She found work as a teacher in the New York public education system for several years before landing work with Park Row Publishing as an editor in medical publishing.

Roy Innis made attempts to bring Doris back to CORE, but she kept her distance. She assisted CORE on two of its last magazines, one being the new publication, The Correspondent. She declined to take editorial credit for both publications.

By the 2000s Doris had semi-retired from editing but was a frequent contributing writer to South Carolina's Georgetown Times. She had since moved back to South Carolina to be closer to her mother.

== Death ==
Doris Innis died in her New York home at the age of 82.
