= Jeanne Hopkins Lucas =

American politician

Jeanne Hopkins Lucas (December 25, 1935 - March 9, 2007) was the first African-American woman elected to serve in North Carolina's state Senate.

Lucas was born in Durham, North Carolina to Robert Hopkins and Bertha Holman Hopkins. She attended East End Elementary School, Whitted Junior High School, and Hillside High School, where she graduated in 1953. She completed a Bachelor of Arts in Foreign Languages at North Carolina Central University, where she was a member of the Delta Sigma Theta sorority. Lucas returned to Hillside to teach French and Spanish between 1957 and 1975. From 1975 to 1976 she served as President of the North Carolina Association of Classroom Teachers. She gained her Master of Arts in School Administration from NCCU in 1977, and until 1993 worked in administrative positions for Durham Public Schools.

In 1993, Lucas was appointed to the state's twentieth Senatorial district to complete the term of former Senator Ralph Hunt, and was subsequently re-elected six times. Lucas, known as "Queen Jeanne" by some of her fellow Senators, served on various Senate committees including in a number of leadership positions such as Majority Whip and Senior Chair of the Appropriations on Education/Higher Education Committee, Cochair of the Education/Higher Education Committee, and Vice-Chair of Agriculture/Environment/Natural Resources Committee.

She was a member and Trustee of Mount Gilead Baptist Church, and was active in a variety of other civic groups in Durham including the local branch of the NAACP.

In 2003, she was diagnosed with a breast cancer tumor and underwent vigorous treatment to remove it. On her death the son of late civil rights leader Floyd McKissick, Floyd McKissick, Jr., was appointed to fill the remainder of her term in the North Carolina Senate.

North Carolina Senate
Preceded by Ralph Alexander Hunt; Kenneth Claiborne Royall Jr.	Member of the North Carolina Senate from the 13th district 1993–2003; Served alongside: Wib Gulley	Succeeded by David Weinstein
Preceded by Linda Garrou; Hamilton Horton Jr.	Member of the North Carolina Senate from the 20th district 2003–2007	Succeeded by Floyd McKissick Jr.
