= Ussery =

Ussery is a surname. Notable people with the surname include:

- Bobby Ussery (born 1935), American thoroughbred jockey
- Terdema Ussery (born 1958), American basketball executive
- Wilfred Ussery (born 1928), American civic leader
- Jeff Ussery (born 1979), Corporate Executive, Mayor of Republic, MO

== See also ==
- Asteroid 17831 Ussery
