= North Carolina's 31st Senate district =

American legislative district

North Carolina's 31st State Senate district
Senator
| Dana Caudill Jones; R–Kernersville |
- Demographics: 58% White; 23% Black; 15% Hispanic; 1% Asian; 3% Multiracial
- Population (2023): 219,462

North Carolina's 31st Senate district is one of 50 districts in the North Carolina Senate. It has been represented by Republican Dana Caudill Jones since 2025.

== Geography ==
Since 2023, the district has included all of Stokes County, as well as part of Forsyth County. The district overlaps with the 74th, 75th, and 91st state house districts.

== District officeholders ==
| Senator | Party | Dates | Notes | Counties |
|---|---|---|---|---|
| District created January 1, 1983. | | | | 1983–2003; Part of Guilford County. |
| Bill Martin (Greensboro) | Democratic | January 1, 1983 – January 1, 2003 | Redistricted to the 28th district and retired to run for Congress. | 1983–2003; Part of Guilford County. |
| Hamilton Horton Jr. (Winston-Salem) | Republican | January 1, 2003 – January 31, 2006 | Redistricted from the 20th district. Died. | 2003–2013; Part of Forsyth County. |
| Vacant | | January 31, 2006 – March 8, 2006 | | 2003–2013; Part of Forsyth County. |
| William Miller (Pfafftown) | Republican | March 8, 2006 – May 29, 2006 | Appointed to continue Horton's term. Resigned. | 2003–2013; Part of Forsyth County. |
| Vacant | | May 29, 2006 – May 30, 2006 | | 2003–2013; Part of Forsyth County. |
| Pete Brunstetter (Lewisville) | Republican | May 30, 2006 – December 15, 2013 | Appointed to finish Horton's term. Resigned. | 2003–2013; Part of Forsyth County. |
| Pete Brunstetter (Lewisville) | Republican | May 30, 2006 – December 15, 2013 | Appointed to finish Horton's term. Resigned. | 2013–2019; All of Yadkin County. Part of Forsyth County |
| Vacant | | December 15, 2013 – January 10, 2014 | | 2013–2019; All of Yadkin County. Part of Forsyth County |
| Joyce Krawiec (Kernersville) | Republican | January 10, 2014 – November 21, 2024 | Appointed to finish Brunstetter's term. Resigned. | 2013–2019; All of Yadkin County. Part of Forsyth County |
| Joyce Krawiec (Kernersville) | Republican | January 10, 2014 – November 21, 2024 | Appointed to finish Brunstetter's term. Resigned. | 2019–2023; All of Davie County. Part of Forsyth County. |
| Joyce Krawiec (Kernersville) | Republican | January 10, 2014 – November 21, 2024 | Appointed to finish Brunstetter's term. Resigned. | 2023–Present; All of Stokes County. Part of Forsyth County. |
| Vacant | | November 21, 2024 – November 29, 2024 | | 2023–Present; All of Stokes County. Part of Forsyth County. |
| Dana Caudill Jones (Kernersville) | Republican | November 29, 2024 – Present | Appointed to finish Krawiec's term. | 2023–Present; All of Stokes County. Part of Forsyth County. |

== Election results ==
=== 2024 ===
North Carolina Senate 31st district Democratic primary election, 2024
| Party | Candidate | Votes | % |
|---|---|---|---|
| Democratic | Ronda Mays | 6,241 | 53.78% |
| Democratic | Laurelyn Dossett | 5,363 | 46.22% |
| Total votes | | 11,604 | 100% |

North Carolina Senate 31st district general election, 2024
| Party | Candidate | Votes | % |
|---|---|---|---|
| Republican | Dana Caudill Jones | 78,429 | 62.42% |
| Democratic | Ronda Mays | 47,035 | 37.43% |
| Write-in | | 186 | 0.15% |
| Independent | Teresa Hopper Prizer (write-in) | 7 | 0.01% |
| Total votes | | 125,657 | 100% |
| Republican hold | | | |

=== 2022 ===
North Carolina Senate 31st district general election, 2022
| Party | Candidate | Votes | % |
|---|---|---|---|
| Republican | Joyce Krawiec (incumbent) | 48,815 | 100% |
| Total votes | | 48,815 | 100% |
| Republican hold | | | |

=== 2020 ===
North Carolina Senate 31st district general election, 2020
| Party | Candidate | Votes | % |
|---|---|---|---|
| Republican | Joyce Krawiec (incumbent) | 56,479 | 53.08% |
| Democratic | Terri Elizabeth LeGrand | 49,929 | 46.92% |
| Total votes | | 106,408 | 100% |
| Republican hold | | | |

=== 2018 ===
North Carolina Senate 31st district Republican primary election, 2018
| Party | Candidate | Votes | % |
|---|---|---|---|
| Republican | Joyce Krawiec (incumbent) | 6,436 | 48.64% |
| Republican | Dan Barrett (incumbent) | 6,204 | 46.88% |
| Republican | Peter Antinozzi | 593 | 4.48% |
| Total votes | | 13,233 | 100% |

North Carolina Senate 31st district general election, 2018
| Party | Candidate | Votes | % |
|---|---|---|---|
| Republican | Joyce Krawiec (incumbent) | 54,267 | 61.00% |
| Democratic | John Motsinger Jr. | 34,693 | 39.00% |
| Total votes | | 88,960 | 100% |
| Republican hold | | | |

=== 2016 ===
North Carolina Senate 31st district Republican primary election, 2016
| Party | Candidate | Votes | % |
|---|---|---|---|
| Republican | Joyce Krawiec (incumbent) | 19,630 | 62.38% |
| Republican | Dempsey Brewer | 8,571 | 27.24% |
| Republican | Peter Antinozzi | 3,267 | 10.38% |
| Total votes | | 31,468 | 100% |

North Carolina Senate 31st district general election, 2016
| Party | Candidate | Votes | % |
|---|---|---|---|
| Republican | Joyce Krawiec (incumbent) | 83,599 | 100% |
| Total votes | | 83,599 | 100% |
| Republican hold | | | |

=== 2014 ===
North Carolina Senate 31st district Republican primary election, 2014
| Party | Candidate | Votes | % |
|---|---|---|---|
| Republican | Joyce Krawiec (incumbent) | 7,942 | 43.81% |
| Republican | Dempsey Brewer | 5,201 | 28.69% |
| Republican | Steve Wiles | 4,985 | 27.50% |
| Total votes | | 18,128 | 100% |

North Carolina Senate 31st district general election, 2014
| Party | Candidate | Votes | % |
|---|---|---|---|
| Republican | Joyce Krawiec (incumbent) | 45,915 | 64.82% |
| Democratic | John K. Motsinger Sr. | 24,922 | 35.18% |
| Total votes | | 70,837 | 100% |
| Republican hold | | | |

=== 2012 ===
North Carolina Senate 31st district general election, 2012
| Party | Candidate | Votes | % |
|---|---|---|---|
| Republican | Pete Brunstetter (incumbent) | 71,806 | 68.98% |
| Democratic | Delmas Parker | 32,298 | 31.02% |
| Total votes | | 104,104 | 100% |
| Republican hold | | | |

=== 2010 ===
North Carolina Senate 31st district general election, 2010
| Party | Candidate | Votes | % |
|---|---|---|---|
| Republican | Pete Brunstetter (incumbent) | 43,080 | 100% |
| Total votes | | 43,080 | 100% |
| Republican hold | | | |

=== 2008 ===
North Carolina Senate 31st district general election, 2008
| Party | Candidate | Votes | % |
|---|---|---|---|
| Republican | Pete Brunstetter (incumbent) | 65,201 | 100% |
| Total votes | | 65,201 | 100% |
| Republican hold | | | |

=== 2006 ===
North Carolina Senate 31st district Republican primary election, 2006
| Party | Candidate | Votes | % |
|---|---|---|---|
| Republican | Pete Brunstetter (incumbent) | 4,432 | 44.47% |
| Republican | Nathan Tabor | 3,176 | 31.87% |
| Republican | Gloria D. Whisenhunt | 2,358 | 23.66% |
| Total votes | | 9,966 | 100% |

North Carolina Senate 31st district general election, 2006
| Party | Candidate | Votes | % |
|---|---|---|---|
| Republican | Pete Brunstetter (incumbent) | 32,077 | 100% |
| Total votes | | 32,077 | 100% |
| Republican hold | | | |

=== 2004 ===
North Carolina Senate 31st district general election, 2004
| Party | Candidate | Votes | % |
|---|---|---|---|
| Republican | Hamilton Horton Jr. (incumbent) | 62,098 | 100% |
| Total votes | | 62,098 | 100% |
| Republican hold | | | |

=== 2002 ===
North Carolina Senate 31st district general election, 2002
| Party | Candidate | Votes | % |
|---|---|---|---|
| Republican | Hamilton Horton Jr. (incumbent) | 43,590 | 88.15% |
| Libertarian | Donn Linton | 5,857 | 11.85% |
| Total votes | | 49,447 | 100% |
| Republican hold | | | |

=== 2000 ===
North Carolina Senate 31st district general election, 2000
| Party | Candidate | Votes | % |
|---|---|---|---|
| Democratic | Bill Martin (incumbent) | 35,519 | 100% |
| Total votes | | 35,519 | 100% |
| Democratic hold | | | |
