= Clarence Funnyé =

Clarence Delmonte Funnyé
- Born: Georgetown, South Carolina, United States
- Died: 1970 outside Georgetown, South Carolina
- Occupation: Activist
- Organization: Congress of Racial Equality

Clarence Delmonte Funnyé was the chairman of the Congress of Racial Equality (CORE) in Harlem from 1964 to 1965. He staged a series of creative protests that promoted policies of radical integrationism and challenged "the exclusion of blacks in the media." For example, he stood on a street corner with television sets tuned to various channels and offered a dollar to whoever saw a black person on the screens (in six days there were 15 sightings). In 1963 he wrote to the Coca-Cola Company, asking that it introduce racial integration in its advertising or face a boycott. The company first placed integrated ads in magazines such as Ebony, with its first such television commercial appearing in 1969.

His younger sister, Doris Funnye Innis also became an active member of the Congress of Racial Equality serving as the Editor for its publications, Rights and Reviews and CORE Magazine. Doris went on to marry Roy Innis, who later became National Chairman of CORE.

== Early life and death ==
Funnyé was born in Georgetown, South Carolina. His father was a minister. He attended North Carolina A&T, a historically black university, majoring in architectural engineering, after serving a tour in the Army. He married Mary Ensley from Birmingham (who went on to teach Social Work at Columbia University), and they moved to New York City, where they had two sons: Clarence delMonte Funnye Jr. (known as Monte) and Bradley Joel Funnye. They settled in Brooklyn, where he studied City and Regional Planning at Pratt Institute, and earned a Master's Degree, while he worked for the Army Pictorial Center. He died in 1970 when the plane he was piloting (and owned) crashed outside Georgetown, South Carolina.
