= Peter S. Brunstetter =

American politician (born 1956)

Peter Samuel Brunstetter
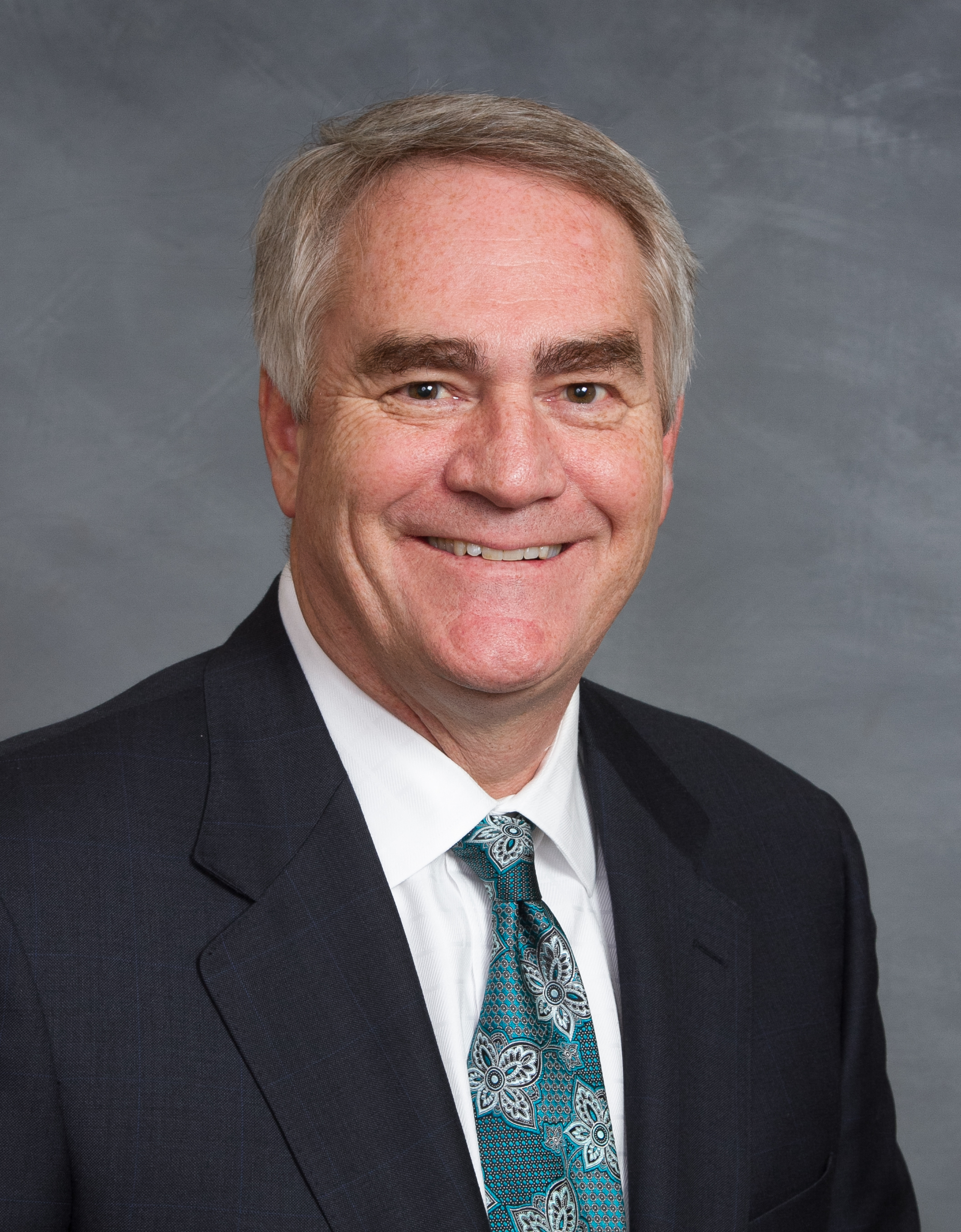

Member of the North Carolina Senate from the 31st district
- In office May 29, 2006 – December 15, 2013
- Preceded by: William B. Miller
- Succeeded by: Joyce Krawiec

Personal details
- Born: February 28, 1956 (age 70) San Francisco, California
- Party: Republican
- Children: 4, including Bekah Brunstetter
- Education: Tulane University; University of Virginia
- Profession: Attorney, Healthcare Executive and Higher Education Executive

Peter Samuel Brunstetter (born February 28, 1956, in San Francisco, California) is a former Republican member of the North Carolina General Assembly who represented the state’s 31st Senate district, including constituents in Forsyth County and Yadkin County, North Carolina. He resigned from the legislature, effective Dec. 15, 2013, to become executive vice president and chief legal officer for Winston-Salem-based Novant Health. He served with Novant Health until November 2018. He served as the Chief Operating Officer of the University of North Carolina System, headquartered in Chapel Hill, NC, from January 2019 to July 2020.

Brunstetter received his B.A. in Political Science from Tulane University in 1977, and his J.D. from the University of Virginia in 1984 (Order of the Coif).

From 1977 until 1981, Brunstetter served as a commissioned officer in the U.S. Navy aboard the USS Briscoe, leaving with the rank of lieutenant. Brunstetter served in the Navy Reserves from 1981 until 1990, leaving with the rank of lieutenant commander.

Brunstetter for many years practiced law at Womble Carlyle Sandridge & Rice, LLP, in Winston-Salem, North Carolina, and resided in Lewisville with his wife Jodie. He and his wife currently reside in Huddleston, Virginia. He is a former partner in the Corporate and Securities Practice group at Womble Carlyle.

Brunstetter served as chairman of the Forsyth County Board of Elections from 1990 to 1991, and was appointed to fill a vacancy in the Forsyth County Board of Commissioners in September 1991. He served on the board until 2004, after being elected to the position in 1992, 1996, and 2000. Brunstetter served as chairman of the Board of Commissioners from 1994 until 2004, when he chose not to run for re-election.

In 2006, Brunstetter was appointed to fill a vacancy in the NC Senate resulting from the death of Senator Ham Horton. Brunstetter served the Senate as co-chairman of the Appropriations/Base Budget Committee, chairman of the Senate Judiciary I Committee, vice-chairman of the Committee on Rules and Operations of the Senate, and as a member of the Finance, Commerce, and Redistricting Committees.

Brunstetter is the former chairman of Novant Health, Inc. He is a former adjunct professor of law at Elon University School of Law. He served on the board of visitors of the University of North Carolina at Chapel Hill, NC State University and the University of North Carolina at Wilmington. He is a former member of the board of trustees at the University of North Carolina School of the Arts. He served on the board of governors of North Carolina Bar Association. Brunstetter was the 2013 recipient of the Dr. I. Beverly Lake Public Service Award from the North Carolina Bar Association. He is also a recipient of North Carolina’s highest civilian honor, The Order of the Long Leaf Pine.

North Carolina Senate
Preceded by William B. Miller	Member of the North Carolina Senate from the 31st district 2006-2013	Succeeded by Joyce Krawiec
