= Earline Parmon =

American politician (1943–2016)

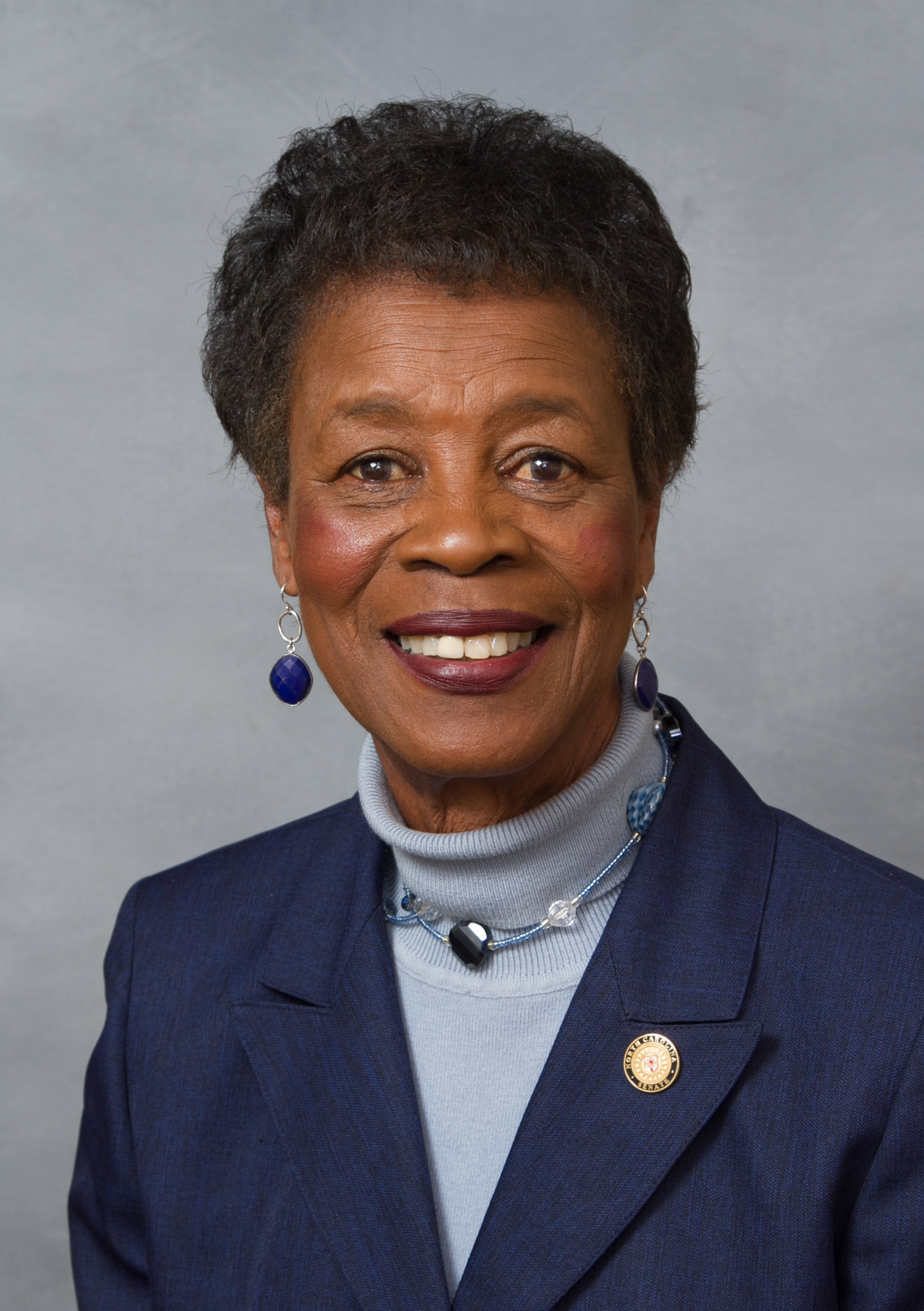

Member of the North Carolina Senate from the 32nd district
- In office January 1, 2013 – January 28, 2015
- Preceded by: Linda Garrou
- Succeeded by: Paul Lowe Jr.

Member of the North Carolina House of Representatives from the 72nd district
- In office January 1, 2003 – January 1, 2013
- Preceded by: Warren Oldham (Redistricting)
- Succeeded by: Ed Hanes

Personal details
- Born: November 18, 1943 Buffalo, New York, U.S.
- Died: March 15, 2016 (aged 72) Winston-Salem, North Carolina, U.S.
- Party: Democratic
- Education: Winston-Salem State University

Earline W. Parmon (November 18, 1943 – March 15, 2016) was an American politician. Born in Buffalo, New York, Parmon graduated from Winston-Salem State University. She served as a Democratic member of the North Carolina General Assembly representing the state's seventy-second House district, including constituents in Forsyth County. An education consultant from Winston-Salem, North Carolina, Parmon has served five terms in the state House from 2002 to 2013. She announced in 2012 that she would run for a seat in the North Carolina Senate. Parmon served in the North Carolina Senate from 2013 until her resignation in 2015. She was the first African American ever to represent Forsyth County in the State Senate. Parmon also served as Forsyth County, North Carolina commissioner. Parmon died on March 15, 2016.

== Electoral history ==
=== 2014 ===
North Carolina Senate 32nd district general election, 2014
Party	Candidate	Votes	%
Democratic	Earline Parmon (incumbent)	36,045	100%
Total votes		36,045	100%
Democratic hold			

=== 2012 ===
North Carolina Senate 32nd district Democratic primary election, 2012
Party	Candidate	Votes	%
Democratic	Earline Parmon	10,858	60.01%
Democratic	James Taylor	6,452	35.66%
Democratic	Wilbert S. Banks	785	4.34%
Total votes		18,095	100%

North Carolina Senate 32nd district general election, 2012
Party	Candidate	Votes	%
Democratic	Earline Parmon	57,803	72.99%
Republican	Reginald Reid	21,387	27.01%
Total votes		79,190	100%
Democratic hold			

=== 2010 ===
North Carolina House of Representatives 72nd district Democratic primary election, 2010
Party	Candidate	Votes	%
Democratic	Earline Parmon (incumbent)	2,205	75.64%
Democratic	Gardenia M. Henley	710	24.36%
Total votes		2,915	100%

North Carolina House of Representatives 72nd district general election, 2010
Party	Candidate	Votes	%
Democratic	Earline Parmon (incumbent)	9,980	69.48%
Republican	John Magee	4,384	30.52%
Total votes		14,364	100%
Democratic hold			

=== 2008 ===
North Carolina House of Representatives 72nd district general election, 2008
Party	Candidate	Votes	%
Democratic	Earline Parmon (incumbent)	22,474	100%
Total votes		22,474	100%
Democratic hold			

=== 2006 ===
North Carolina House of Representatives 72nd district general election, 2006
Party	Candidate	Votes	%
Democratic	Earline Parmon (incumbent)	7,971	100%
Total votes		7,971	100%
Democratic hold			

=== 2004 ===
North Carolina House of Representatives 72nd district general election, 2004
Party	Candidate	Votes	%
Democratic	Earline Parmon (incumbent)	17,286	100%
Total votes		17,286	100%
Democratic hold			

=== 2002 ===
North Carolina House of Representatives 72nd district Democratic primary election, 2002
Party	Candidate	Votes	%
Democratic	Earline Parmon	2,333	39.74%
Democratic	George Bryan	1,639	27.92%
Democratic	Annette Beatty	1,220	20.78%
Democratic	Mischi Binkley	679	11.57%
Total votes		5,871	100%

North Carolina House of Representatives 72nd district general election, 2002
Party	Candidate	Votes	%
Democratic	Earline Parmon	8,183	54.78%
Republican	Vernon Robinson	6,754	45.22%
Total votes		14,937	100%
Democratic hold			

North Carolina House of Representatives
Preceded by Gene Arnold	Member of the North Carolina House of Representatives from the 72nd district 2003-2013	Succeeded by Ed Hanes
North Carolina Senate
Preceded by Linda Garrou	Member of the North Carolina Senate from the 32nd district 2013-2015	Succeeded by Paul Lowe Jr.
