= Paul A. Lowe Jr. =

American politician

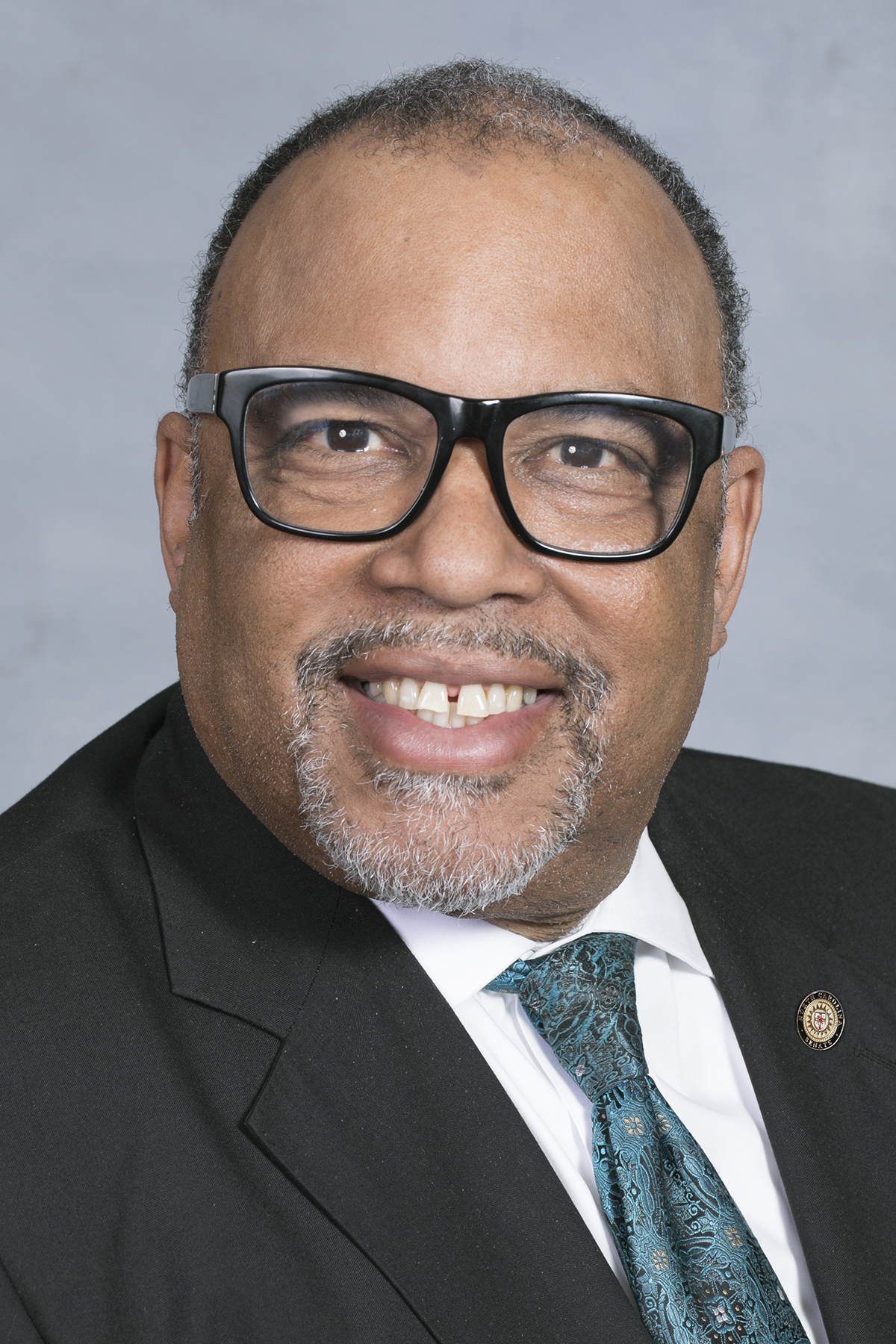

Member of the North Carolina Senate from the 32nd district
- Incumbent
- Assumed office January 30, 2015
- Preceded by: Earline Parmon

Personal details
- Born: May 19, 1959 (age 67) Seattle, Washington, U.S.
- Party: Democratic

Paul A. Lowe Jr. (born May 19, 1959) is an American politician who has served in the North Carolina Senate from the 32nd district since 2015. He was first appointed to fill the vacancy left by Earline W. Parmon's resignation.

North Carolina Senate
Preceded by Earline Parmon	Member of the North Carolina Senate from the 32nd district 2015-Present	Incumbent
