= William Haddad =

American political operative, lobbyist, and journalist (1928–2020)

- Born: July 25, 1928; Charlotte, North Carolina
- Died: April 20, 2020 (aged 91); Poughquag, New York
- Education: Columbia University (BA, MS)
- Occupations: Political operative, lobbyist, and journalist
- Spouses: Kate Roosevelt (divorced) Noreen Walsh (divorced)

William Haddad (July 25, 1928 – April 30, 2020) was an American political operative, lobbyist, and journalist. He is best known for being an aide to the Kennedy Family, during which he helped launch the Peace Corps with R. Sargent Shriver, worked in the 1960 presidential campaign of John F. Kennedy and the 1968 presidential campaign of Robert F. Kennedy. He also assisted prominent Democratic Party figures such as Mario Cuomo and Estes Kefauver and led the fight for affordable medicine as a lobbyist and businessman.

== Early life and education ==
Haddad was born on July 25, 1928, in Charlotte, North Carolina, to Esther (Nowack) Haddad, a Jewish immigrant from Russia, and Charles Haddad, a Syrian Jew. He graduated from St. Petersburg Junior College in Florida and received a bachelor's degree from Columbia College in 1954. He also studied at the Columbia Graduate School of Journalism.

== Career ==
After finishing college, Haddad began a career moving back and forth between business, journalism, and politics. He first worked for Senator Estes Kefauver from 1954 to 1956 and helped secure his nomination as Adlai Stevenson’s vice-presidential running mate, beating out John F. Kennedy at the 1956 Democratic National Convention.

He later worked for the New York Post and helped expose the corruption of Robert Moses, which led to his eventual downfall. He won a Polk Award in 1958 and shared another in 1959 for his investigate reporting.

He then took a break from his journalism career and was a special assistant to Kennedy during his presidential campaign. He was also an aide to Sargent Shriver, with whom he helped found the Peace Corps and was its as first associate director and inspector general from 1961 to 1963.

After the Peace Corps, Haddad returned to work for the New York Herald Tribune, whose publisher, John Hay Whitney, was his father-in-law. He resigned from the newspaper after spending a few months on the investigative team and unsuccessfully challenged Democratic Congressman Leonard Farbstein for his seat in New York's 19th congressional district.

After losing the primary, he was the inspector general for the Office of Economic Opportunity from 1964 to 1966. He advised Robert F. Kennedy during his presidential campaign in 1968, served on the Board of Education of New York, and enlisted activist Roy Innis in a newspaper called The Manhattan Tribune to provide a biracial perspective. The paper ceased publications in 1972.

In 1972, Haddad sent a letter to investigative journalist Jack Anderson warning him of a tip-off from a private investigator about a plan by the Nixon administration to wiretap the telephones at the Democratic National Committee. Anderson was focused on reporting on a separate scandal involving the Attorney General-nominee Richard Kleindienst's handling of an antitrust suit against ITT Inc. at the Justice Department and did not follow up on the tip. The wiretapping plan eventually led to the Watergate scandal and Nixon's political downfall.

In his business career, Haddad joined a venture with John DeLorean in the newly founded DeLorean Motor Company in 1979 and was its marketing director. He left the company and published a book, Hard Driving: My Years With John DeLorean, chronicling the rise and fall of their joint venture.

He was Mario Cuomo's campaign manager in the 1982 New York gubernatorial election. Afterwards, he began to lobby to reduce the prices of prescription drugs and was the chairman of the Generic Pharmaceutical Industry Association that was merged into the Association for Accessible Medicines. His lobbying was instrumental in the passing of the Drug Price Competition and Patent Term Restoration Act (Hatch-Waxman Act) in 1984, which helped launch the generic drug industry in the United States. He also worked with Indian scientist Yusuf Hamied of Cipla to distribute low-cost medicine to combat HIV/AIDS in Africa and India.

== Personal life ==
In 1959, Haddad married Kate Roosevelt, daughter of Congressman James Roosevelt and Betsey Cushing Roosevelt Whitney, granddaughter of President Franklin D. Roosevelt and neurosurgeon Harvey Cushing. Her mother divorced James Roosevelt and was remarried to John Hay Whitney, the American Ambassador to the United Kingdom, who adopted Roosevelt as his daughter. The marriage ended in divorce and his second marriage to Noreen Walsh also ended in divorce.

He died on April 30, 2020, due to congestive heart failure.

He is survived by children of both his marriages, a stepson, 13 grandchildren, and two great-grandsons.
