= Linda Garrou =

American politician (1943–2022)

Member of the North Carolina Senate
- In office January 1, 1999 – January 1, 2013
- Preceded by: James Mark McDaniel
- Succeeded by: Earline Parmon
- Constituency: 20th District (1999-2003); 32nd District (2003-2013)

Personal details
- Born: January 17, 1943 Atlanta, Georgia, U.S.
- Died: March 19, 2022 (aged 79) Winston-Salem, North Carolina, U.S.
- Party: Democratic
- Spouse: John
- Education: Sullins College, University of Georgia, University of North Carolina at Chapel Hill
- Profession: educator, administrator

Linda Garrou (January 17, 1943 – March 19, 2022) was a Democratic member of the North Carolina General Assembly representing the state's thirty-second Senate district since 1999 until 2012. Her district includes constituents in Forsyth county. An administrator from Winston-Salem, North Carolina, Garrou was the Co-Chair of the Senate Appropriations/Base Committee, and the Pensions, Retirement and Aging Committee.

Garrou died on March 19, 2022, at Forsyth Memorial Hospital, in Winston-Salem, North Carolina.

North Carolina Senate
Preceded by James Mark McDaniel	Member of the North Carolina Senate from the 20th district 1999–2003; Served alongside: Hamilton Horton Jr.	Succeeded by Jeanne Hopkins Lucas
Preceded by Kay Hagan	Member of the North Carolina Senate from the 32nd district 2003–2013	Succeeded by Earline Parmon
