= Joyce Krawiec =

American politician

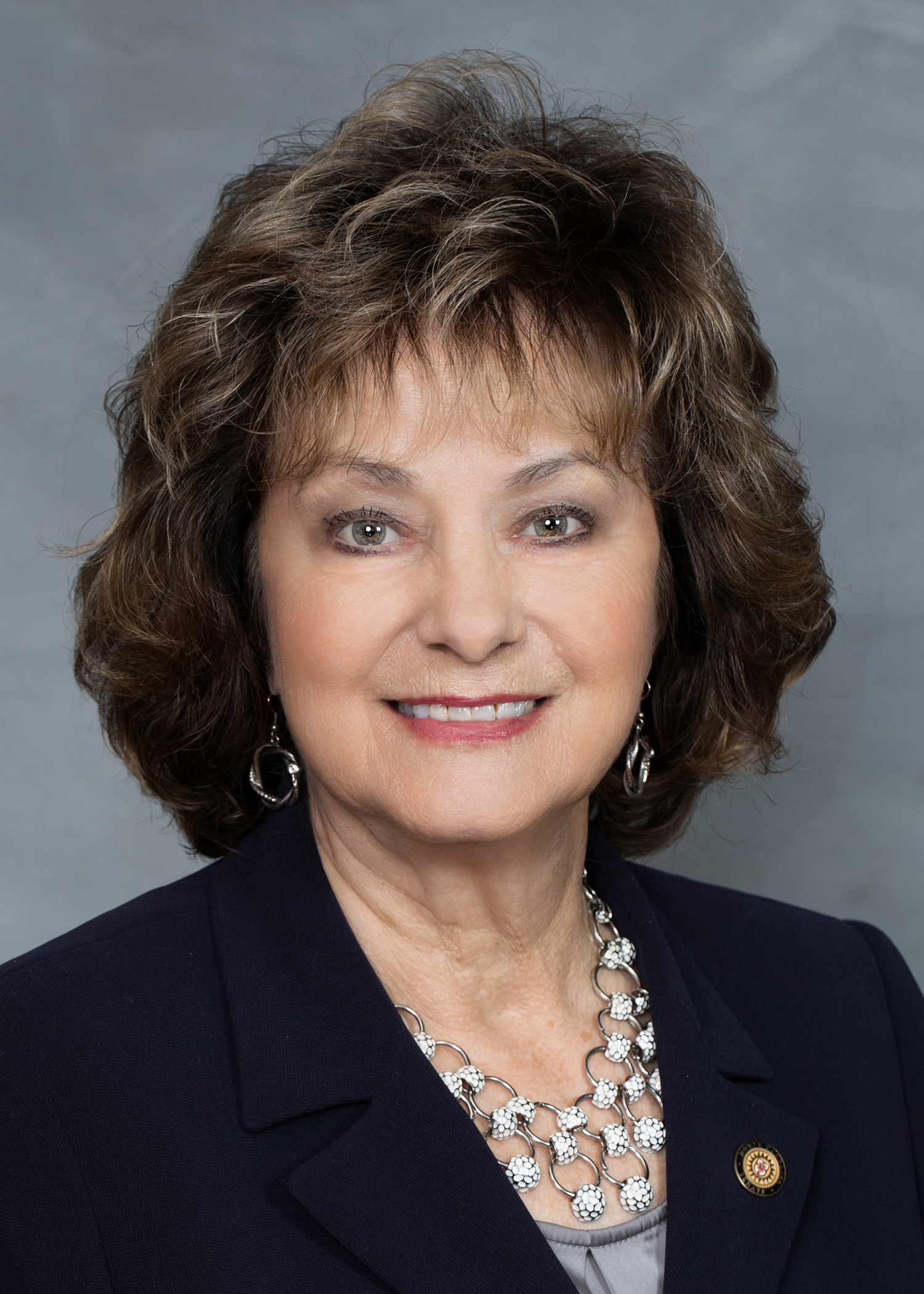

Member of the North Carolina Senate from the 31st district
- In office January 10, 2014 – November 21, 2024
- Preceded by: Pete Brunstetter
- Succeeded by: Dana Caudill Jones

Member of the North Carolina House of Representatives from the 73rd district
- In office October 10, 2012 – January 1, 2013
- Preceded by: Larry Brown
- Succeeded by: Debra Conrad (Redistricting)

Personal details
- Born: June 14, 1945 (age 81) Cheraw, South Carolina, U.S.
- Party: Republican

Joyce Krawiec (born June 14, 1945) is an American politician who served in the North Carolina Senate, representing the 31st district from 2014 to 2024.

== Electoral history ==
=== 2020 ===
North Carolina Senate 31st district general election, 2020
Party	Candidate	Votes	%
Republican	Joyce Krawiec (incumbent)	56,479	53.08%
Democratic	Terri Elizabeth LeGrand	49,929	46.92%
Total votes		106,408	100%
Republican hold			

=== 2018 ===
North Carolina Senate 31st district Republican primary election, 2018
Party	Candidate	Votes	%
Republican	Joyce Krawiec (incumbent)	6,436	48.64%
Republican	Dan Barrett (incumbent)	6,204	46.88%
Republican	Peter Antinozzi	593	4.48%
Total votes		13,233	100%

North Carolina Senate 31st district general election, 2018
Party	Candidate	Votes	%
Republican	Joyce Krawiec (incumbent)	54,267	61.00%
Democratic	John Motsinger Jr.	34,693	39.00%
Total votes		88,960	100%
Republican hold			

=== 2016 ===
North Carolina Senate 31st district Republican primary election, 2016
Party	Candidate	Votes	%
Republican	Joyce Krawiec (incumbent)	19,630	62.38%
Republican	Dempsey Brewer	8,571	27.24%
Republican	Peter Antinozzi	3,267	10.38%
Total votes		31,468	100%

North Carolina Senate 31st district general election, 2016
Party	Candidate	Votes	%
Republican	Joyce Krawiec (incumbent)	83,599	100%
Total votes		83,599	100%
Republican hold			

=== 2014 ===
North Carolina Senate 31st district Republican primary election, 2014
Party	Candidate	Votes	%
Republican	Joyce Krawiec (incumbent)	7,942	43.81%
Republican	Dempsey Brewer	5,201	28.69%
Republican	Steve Wiles	4,985	27.50%
Total votes		18,128	100%

North Carolina Senate 31st district general election, 2014
Party	Candidate	Votes	%
Republican	Joyce Krawiec (incumbent)	45,915	64.82%
Democratic	John K. Motsinger Sr.	24,922	35.18%
Total votes		70,837	100%
Republican hold			

North Carolina House of Representatives
Preceded by Larry Brown	Member of the North Carolina House of Representatives from the 73rd district 2012–2013	Succeeded by Mark Hollo
North Carolina Senate
Preceded by Pete Brunstetter	Member of the North Carolina Senate from the 31st district 2014–2024	Succeeded by Dana Caudill Jones
