= North Carolina's 32nd Senate district =

American legislative district

North Carolina's 32nd State Senate district
Senator
Paul Lowe Jr. D–Winston-Salem
- Demographics: 58% White; 23% Black; 12% Hispanic; 3% Asian; 1% Other; 3% Multiracial
- Population (2023): 212,167

North Carolina's 32nd Senate district is one of 50 districts in the North Carolina Senate. It has been represented by Democrat Paul Lowe Jr. since 2015.

== Geography ==
Since 2003, the district has included part of Forsyth County. The district overlaps with the 71st, 72nd, 74th, and 91st state house districts.

== District officeholders ==
Senator	Party	Dates	Notes	Counties
District created January 1, 1983.				1983–2003; Part of Guilford County.
Rachel Gray (High Point)	Democratic	January 1, 1983 – January 1, 1985	Redistricted from the 19th district.	1983–2003; Part of Guilford County.
Wendell Sawyer (Greensboro)	Republican	January 1, 1985 – January 1, 1987		1983–2003; Part of Guilford County.
Mary Seymour (Greensboro)	Democratic	January 1, 1987 – January 1, 1989		1983–2003; Part of Guilford County.
Richard Chalk Jr. (High Point)	Republican	January 1, 1989 – January 1, 1991		1983–2003; Part of Guilford County.
Mary Seymour (Greensboro)	Democratic	January 1, 1991 – January 1, 1995	Retired.	1983–2003; Part of Guilford County.
Thomas Sawyer Sr. (Greensboro)	Republican	January 1, 1995 – March 19, 1996	Died.	1983–2003; Part of Guilford County.
Vacant		March 19, 1996 – May 9, 1996		1983–2003; Part of Guilford County.
John Blust (Greensboro)	Republican	May 9, 1996 – January 1, 1999	Appointed to finish Sawyer's term. Lost re-election.	1983–2003; Part of Guilford County.
Kay Hagan (Greensboro)	Democratic	January 1, 1999 – January 1, 2003	Redistricted to the 27th district.	1983–2003; Part of Guilford County.
Linda Garrou (Winston-Salem)	Democratic	January 1, 2003 – January 1, 2013	Redistricted from the 20th district. Retired.	2003–Present; Part of Forsyth County.
Earline Parmon (Winston-Salem)	Democratic	January 1, 2013 – January 28, 2015	Resigned.	2003–Present; Part of Forsyth County.
Vacant		January 28, 2015 – January 30, 2015		2003–Present; Part of Forsyth County.
Paul Lowe Jr. (Winston-Salem)	Democratic	January 30, 2015 – Present	Appointed to finish Parmon's term.	2003–Present; Part of Forsyth County.

== Election results ==
=== 2024 ===
North Carolina Senate 32nd district Democratic primary election, 2024
Party	Candidate	Votes	%
Democratic	Paul Lowe Jr. (incumbent)	11,794	64.58%
Democratic	Gardenia Henley	6,469	35.42%
Total votes		18,263	100%

North Carolina Senate 32nd district general election, 2024
Party	Candidate	Votes	%
Democratic	Paul Lowe Jr. (incumbent)	67,131	68.97%
Republican	George Ware	27,442	28.19%
Libertarian	Zac Lentz	2,758	2.83%
Total votes		97,331	100%
Democratic hold			

=== 2022 ===
North Carolina Senate 32nd district general election, 2022
Party	Candidate	Votes	%
Democratic	Paul Lowe Jr. (incumbent)	46,986	59.32%
Republican	George K. Ware	32,220	40.68%
Total votes		79,206	100%
Democratic hold			

=== 2020 ===
North Carolina Senate 32nd district general election, 2020
Party	Candidate	Votes	%
Democratic	Paul Lowe Jr. (incumbent)	67,293	59.40%
Republican	Ven Challa	45,995	40.60%
Total votes		113,288	100%
Democratic hold			

=== 2018 ===
North Carolina Senate 32nd district general election, 2018
Party	Candidate	Votes	%
Democratic	Paul Lowe Jr. (incumbent)	47,221	72.88%
Republican	Eric Henderson	17,572	27.12%
Total votes		64,793	100%
Democratic hold			

=== 2016 ===
North Carolina Senate 32nd district general election, 2016
Party	Candidate	Votes	%
Democratic	Paul Lowe Jr. (incumbent)	63,691	100%
Total votes		63,691	100%
Democratic hold			

=== 2014 ===
North Carolina Senate 32nd district general election, 2014
Party	Candidate	Votes	%
Democratic	Earline Parmon (incumbent)	36,045	100%
Total votes		36,045	100%
Democratic hold			

=== 2012 ===
North Carolina Senate 32nd district Democratic primary election, 2012
Party	Candidate	Votes	%
Democratic	Earline Parmon	10,858	60.01%
Democratic	James Taylor	6,452	35.66%
Democratic	Wilbert S. Banks	785	4.34%
Total votes		18,095	100%

North Carolina Senate 32nd district general election, 2012
Party	Candidate	Votes	%
Democratic	Earline Parmon	57,803	72.99%
Republican	Reginald Reid	21,387	27.01%
Total votes		79,190	100%
Democratic hold			

=== 2010 ===
North Carolina Senate 32nd district Democratic primary election, 2010
Party	Candidate	Votes	%
Democratic	Linda Garrou (incumbent)	5,036	81.34%
Democratic	Ed Hanes	1,155	18.66%
Total votes		6,191	100%

North Carolina Senate 32nd district Republican primary election, 2010
Party	Candidate	Votes	%
Republican	Nathan Jones	1,687	60.49%
Republican	Brian C. Miller	1,102	39.51%
Total votes		2,789	100%

North Carolina Senate 32nd district general election, 2010
Party	Candidate	Votes	%
Democratic	Linda Garrou (incumbent)	24,125	65.37%
Republican	Nathan Jones	12,780	34.63%
Total votes		36,905	100%
Democratic hold			

=== 2008 ===
North Carolina Senate 32nd district general election, 2008
Party	Candidate	Votes	%
Democratic	Linda Garrou (incumbent)	57,672	100%
Total votes		57,672	100%
Democratic hold			

=== 2006 ===
North Carolina Senate 32nd district general election, 2006
Party	Candidate	Votes	%
Democratic	Linda Garrou (incumbent)	19,663	100%
Total votes		19,663	100%
Democratic hold			

=== 2004 ===
North Carolina Senate 32nd district Democratic primary election, 2004
Party	Candidate	Votes	%
Democratic	Linda Garrou (incumbent)	5,730	80.36%
Democratic	Jermaine Baxter	1,400	19.64%
Total votes		7,130	100%

North Carolina Senate 32nd district general election, 2004
Party	Candidate	Votes	%
Democratic	Linda Garrou (incumbent)	38,903	69.69%
Republican	W. R. (Bill) Dowe	16,920	30.31%
Total votes		55,823	100%
Democratic hold			

=== 2002 ===
North Carolina Senate 32nd district general election, 2002
Party	Candidate	Votes	%
Democratic	Linda Garrou (incumbent)	28,388	100%
Total votes		28,388	100%
Democratic hold			

=== 2000 ===
North Carolina Senate 32nd district general election, 2000
Party	Candidate	Votes	%
Democratic	Kay Hagan (incumbent)	34,353	61.51%
Republican	Wendell H. Sawyer	21,498	38.49%
Total votes		55,851	100%
Democratic hold			
