= Niger Innis =

American activist and politician

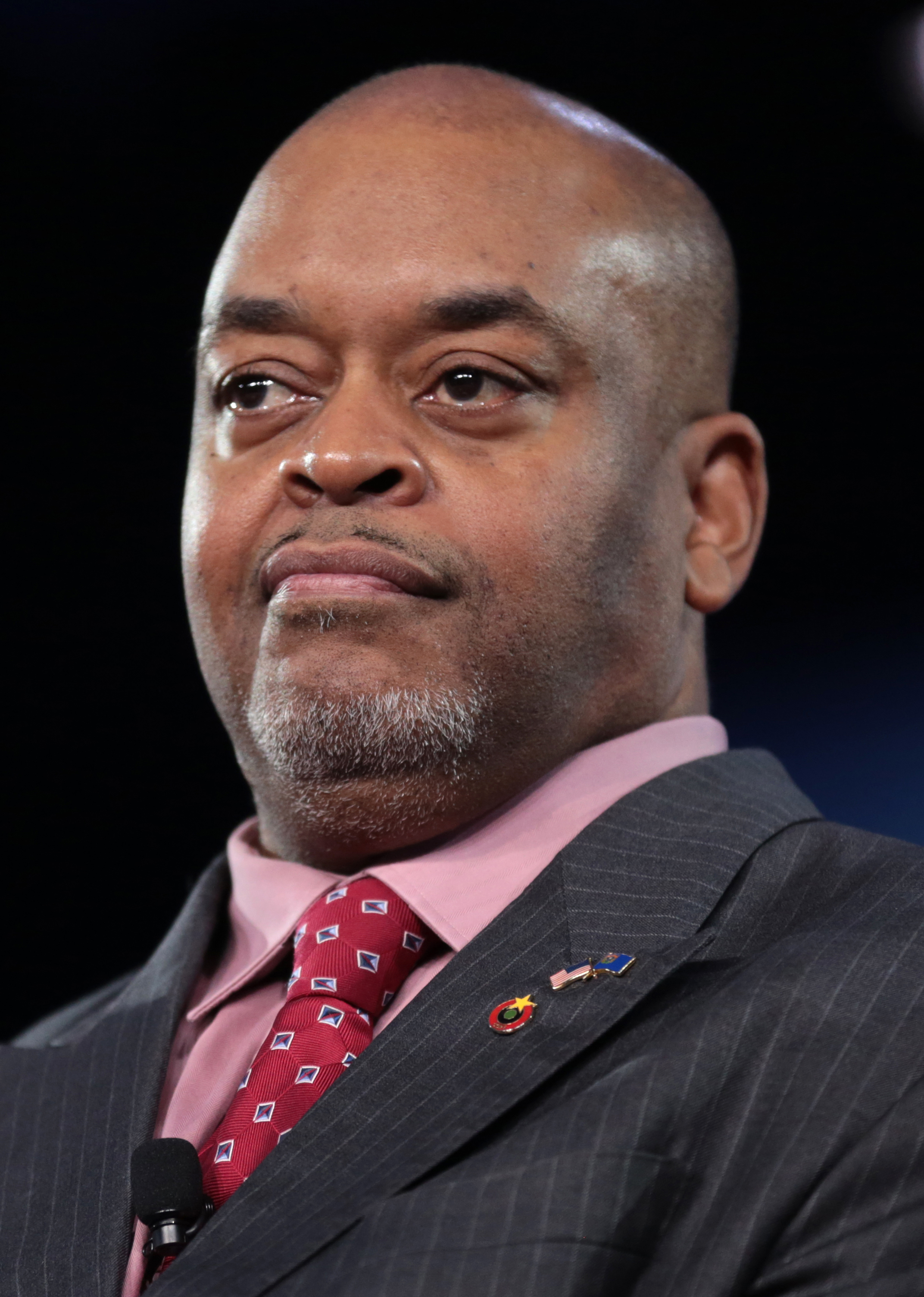
- Innis in 2017
- Born: Niger Roy Innis; March 5, 1968 (age 58); Manhattan, New York, U.S.
- Occupations: Activist and politician
- Political party: Republican
- Parent: Roy Innis (father)
- Website: Official website

Niger Roy Innis (born March 5, 1968) is an American activist and politician. He is the National Spokesperson for the Congress of Racial Equality (CORE) and executive director of TeaPartyFwd.com, and a political consultant. He was an MSNBC commentator.

== Early life and education ==
Innis was born in Harlem, New York, on March 5, 1968, and currently lives in North Las Vegas, Nevada. In 1990, Innis attended Georgetown University, and pursued a degree in political science, but did not graduate from the school.

== Career ==
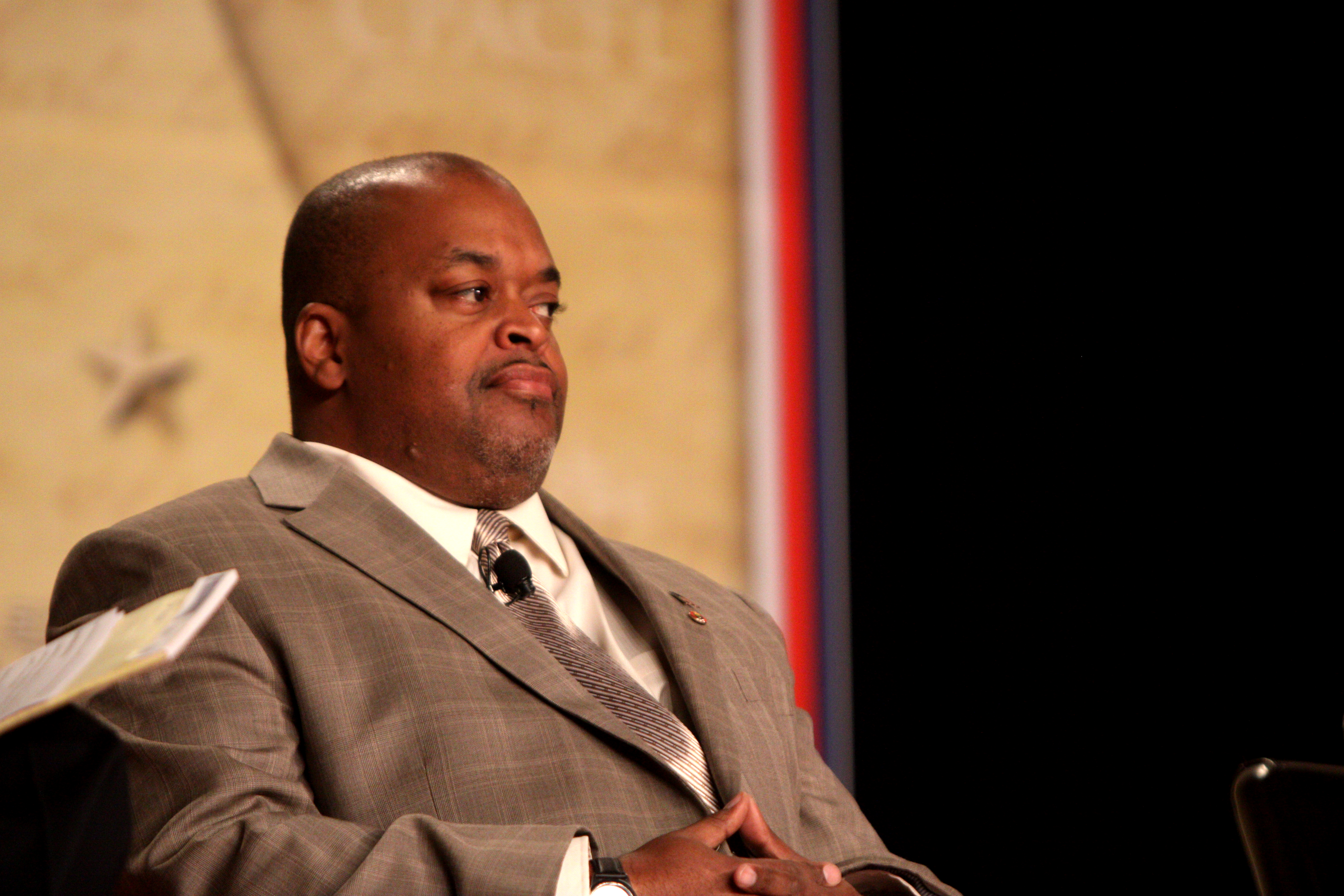
Innis in 2011

Innis is active in community and social organizations, including as Co-Chairman of the Affordable Power Alliance (APA), a coalition of Latino and African American ministerial organizations; Senior Citizen Advocates, which fights against public policies that raise energy costs; Advisory Committee Project 21 for the National Center for Public Policy Research; consultant to EEN247.com, and the Membership Committee of the National Rifle Association of America.

Innis was a political and social commentator for MSNBC and National Public Radio (NPR). He has appeared on CNN, Fox News and the BBC.

His father, Roy Innis, had been National Chairman of CORE since 1968.

Innis is chairman of Tea Party Forward, part of the Tea Party movement. On January 4, 2013, TheTeaParty.net appointed Innis to their Congressional Advocacy Team. He also served as the group's chief strategist.

Innis was a Republican candidate for the United States House of Representatives in Nevada's 4th congressional district during the 2014 elections. He lost the primary to Cresent Hardy, who went on to defeat incumbent Democrat Steven Horsford.
