= Wilfred Ussery =

3rd National Director of the Congress of Racial Equality
- In office 1968–1969
- Preceded by: Floyd McKissick
- Succeeded by: Roy Innis

Personal details
- Born: October 11, 1928 (age 97)

Wilfred T. Ussery (born October 11, 1928) is the former third National Chairman of the Congress of Racial Equality (CORE) in the United States, having served from June 1968 to May 1969.

Ussery is trained as an Architectural Draftsman.

== Racial Justice Career ==
Ussery also served as the Chairman of the San Francisco CORE. He was also the president of Black Urban Systems, a firm that consulted African Americans on getting control of services, institutions, and resources in their communities.

Ussery helped organize non-violent sit-ins across San Francisco, including the 1963 Mel's Drive-In demonstration and the 1964 Automobile Row demonstration.

== BART Leadership ==
Later in life, Ussery served as an elected Director of the San Francisco Bay Area Rapid Transit (BART) District Board.

In 1987, Ussery suggested that BART introduce drinking trains after a rise in fairs caused a 10% drop in ridership. The move would have added club cars to trains to encourage patronage, with sponsorship from major brands like Marriott or Seagram's. In 1993, Ussery brought up the idea again, proposing BART add extra long trains with a bar on each end.

Ussery resigned in June 1996 amid an FBI investigation. In 1999, he pleaded guilty to accepting bribes from a contractor to award them a contract, and he admitted to voting for and attempting to influence BART directors to award the contract.
