= Floyd McKissick Jr. =

American attorney (born 1952)

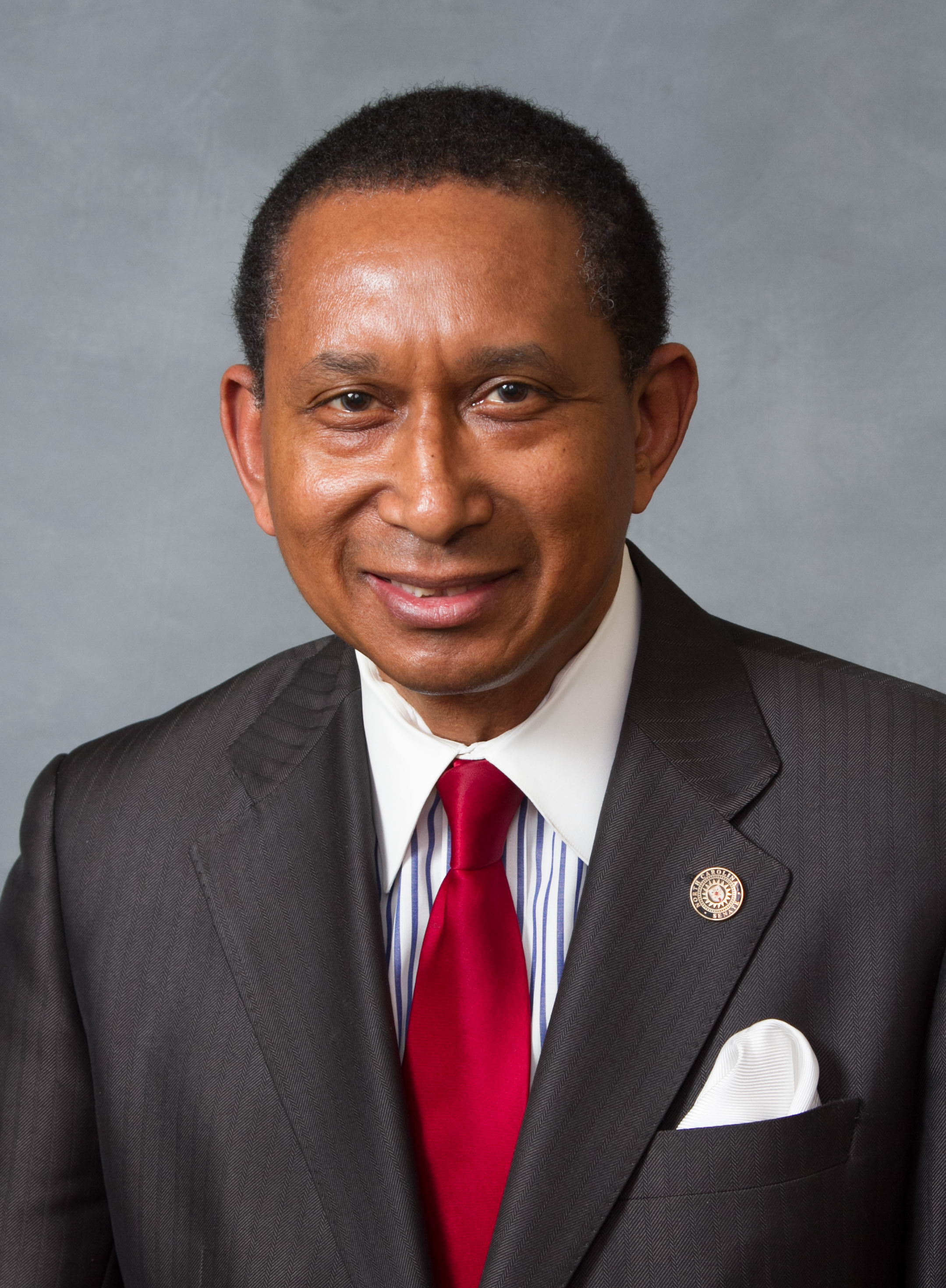

Member of the North Carolina Senate from the 20th district
- In office 2007 – Jan. 7, 2020
- Preceded by: Jeanne Hopkins Lucas
- Succeeded by: Mickey Michaux

Personal details
- Born: November 21, 1952 (age 73) Durham, North Carolina
- Party: Democratic
- Education: Clark University; UNC-Chapel Hill; Harvard University; Duke University
- Occupation: Attorney

Floyd Bixler McKissick Jr. (born November 21, 1952) is an American attorney who served as a Democratic member of the North Carolina Senate. He was appointed to the Senate by Governor Mike Easley on April 18, 2007 to replace the late Jeanne Hopkins Lucas and was later elected and re-elected in his own right. In 2011, he became Deputy Minority Leader in the Senate and chairman of the North Carolina Legislative Black Caucus. He resigned in 2020 after having been appointed by Gov. Roy Cooper to the state Utilities Commission.

McKissick is the son of the late civil rights activist Floyd McKissick.

== Education and career ==
McKissick works in civil litigation. He practices business law, criminal defense, family law, and administrative law.

McKissick received an A.B. Degree in Geography, from Clark University in Worcester, Massachusetts. He received a master's degree in Regional Planning from UNC-Chapel Hill, and a master's degree in Public Administration, from Harvard University. McKissick received a Juris Doctor Degree from the Duke University School of Law in Durham, North Carolina. McKissick has practiced law since 1983 with a number of law firms, including Dickstein Shapiro in Washington, D.C., and Faison, Brown & Brough in Durham, N.C. McKissick has practiced with McKissick & McKissick since 1990.

For a time McKissick owned a convenience store in Warren County, North Carolina. On December 27, 1985 two armed men robbed the store. After taking cash from the register, they shot McKissick in the left arm with a shotgun, nearly detaching it from his body. The two men were later arrested and incarcerated. McKissick's arm healed, though it lost some of its mobility.

He co-authored a guide book for the International Trade Administration in the U.S. Department of Commerce on Attracting Foreign Direct Investment to the United States (1981).

He authored an article for the Construction Law Advisor on When An Owner Can Terminate a Construction Contract Due to Delay (1984).

McKissick was disciplined by the N.C. State Bar for professional misconduct involving a conflict of interest. The bar found that McKissick improperly represented both sides in a 2000 dispute involving the estate decisions of an elderly Durham man.

In 1995, McKissick's former wife said he physically abused her, and in 2001 a former employee of his law firm said he hit her with a telephone. He was acquitted in both cases.

In 1999, McKissick unsuccessfully ran for mayor of Durham.

== Appointment to Senate ==
At the time of his selection by the Durham Democratic Party to fill the vacancy (due to the death of Jeanne Lucas from breast cancer) in District 20 in the state senate, McKissick was the chairman of the Durham County Democratic Party, which raised questions of a conflict of interest in the selection process.
