= Dana Caudill Jones =

American politician

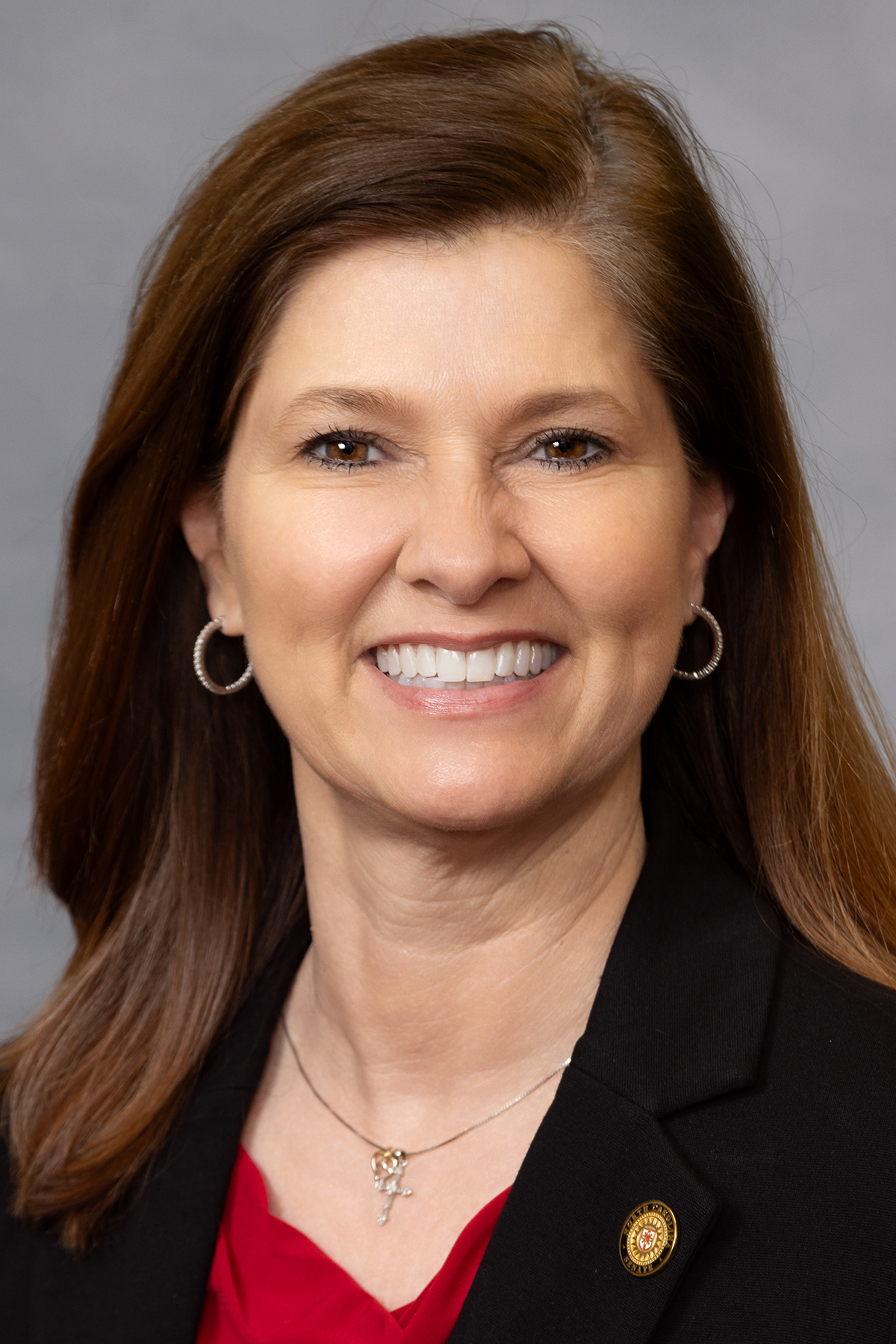

Member of the North Carolina Senate from the 31st district
- Incumbent
- Assumed office November 29, 2024
- Preceded by: Joyce Krawiec

Member of the Forsyth County Board of Education from the 2nd District
- In office 2014–2022
- Preceded by: Jill Tackabery; Buddy Collins; Jane Goins; Marilyn Parker
- Succeeded by: Susan Miller; Robert Barr; Steve Wood

Personal details
- Born: Dana Caudill
- Party: Republican
- Spouse: David
- Children: 1
- Education: High Point University (BA)
- Website: https://www.danacaudilljones.com/

Dana Caudill Jones is an American politician who was elected to the North Carolina Senate.

== Career ==
Jones served on the Winston-Salem/Forsyth County Schools Board of Education for eight years including four as chairwoman.

A Republican, she was elected in the 31st district in the 2024 North Carolina Senate election. She was sworn in later that month following the resignation of her predecessor Joyce Krawiec.

== Political positions ==
=== Electoral history ===
==== 2024 ====
North Carolina Senate 31st district general election, 2024
Party	Candidate	Votes	%
Republican	Dana Caudill Jones	78,429	62.42%
Democratic	Ronda Mays	47,035	37.43%
Write-in		186	0.15%
Independent	Teresa Hopper Prizer (write-in)	7	0.01%
Total votes		125,657	100%
Republican hold			

==== 2018 ====
Forsyth County Board of Education 2nd district Republican primary election, 2018
Party	Candidate	Votes	%
Republican	Lori Goins Clark (incumbent)	6,246	21.82%
Republican	Lida Calvert Hayes	6,086	21.26%
Republican	Dana Caudill Jones (incumbent)	5,722	19.99%
Republican	Leah Crowley	5,308	18.54%
Republican	David Bryant Singletary (incumbent)	5,265	18.39%
Total votes		28,627	100%

Forsyth County Board of Education 2nd district general election, 2018
Party	Candidate	Votes	%
Republican	Lida Calvert Hayes	54,592	17.87%
Republican	Leah Crowley	52,747	17.26%
Republican	Lori Goins Clark (incumbent)	52,462	17.17%
Republican	Dana Caudill Jones (incumbent)	52,460	17.17%
Democratic	Marilynn Baker	47,029	15.39%
Democratic	Rebecca Nussbaum	46,271	15.14%
Total votes		305,561	100%
Republican hold			
Republican hold			
Republican hold			
Republican hold			

==== 2014 ====
Forsyth County Board of Education 2nd district Republican primary election, 2014
Party	Candidate	Votes	%
Republican	Jeannie Metcalf (incumbent)	12,563	26.11%
Republican	Lori Goins Clark (incumbent)	11,213	23.30%
Republican	Dana Caudill Jones	9,532	19.81%
Republican	David Bryant Singletary	7,505	15.60%
Republican	Irene May	7,308	15.19%
Total votes		48,121	100%

Forsyth County Board of Education 2nd district general election, 2014
Party	Candidate	Votes	%
Republican	Jeannie Metcalf (incumbent)	47,290	19.56%
Republican	Lori Goins Clark (incumbent)	46,588	19.27%
Republican	Dana Caudill Jones	43,608	18.04%
Republican	David Bryant Singletary	39,139	16.19%
Democratic	Deanna Frazier Kaplan	33,913	14.03%
Democratic	Laura Elliott	31,204	12.91%
Total votes		241,742	100%
Republican gain from Nonpartisan			
Republican gain from Nonpartisan			
Republican gain from Nonpartisan			
Republican gain from Nonpartisan			

North Carolina Senate
Preceded by Joyce Krawiec	Member of the North Carolina Senate from the 31st district 2024–Present	Incumbent
