= Floyd McKissick =

American civil rights activist (1922–1991)

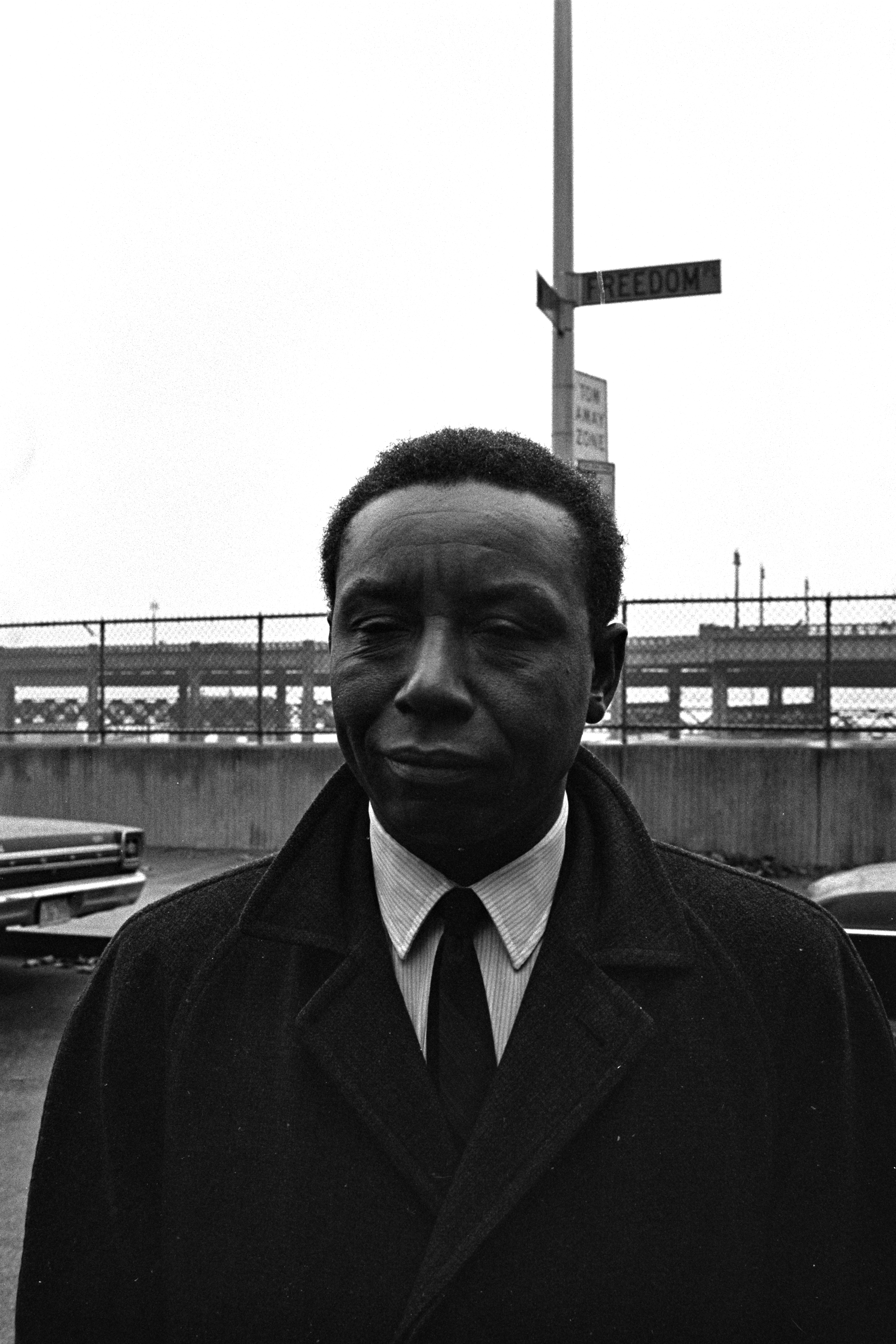
- McKissick at the dedication of Freedom Place in Manhattan, named for slain civil rights activists James Chaney, Andrew Goodman, and Michael Schwerner, November 25, 1967

2nd National Director of the Congress of Racial Equality
- In office 1966–1968
- Preceded by: James Farmer
- Succeeded by: Wilfred Ussery

Personal details
- Born: March 9, 1922 Asheville, North Carolina, U.S.
- Died: April 28, 1991 (aged 69) Soul City, North Carolina, U.S.
- Spouse: Evelyn Williams
- Children: Floyd Jr. Joycelyn; Andree; Charmaine
- Education: Morehouse College

Floyd Bixler McKissick (March 9, 1922 – April 28, 1991) was an American lawyer and civil rights activist. He became the first African-American student at the University of North Carolina School of Law. In 1966 he became leader of CORE, the Congress of Racial Equality, taking over from James Farmer. A supporter of Black Power, he turned CORE into a more radical movement. In 1968, McKissick left CORE to found Soul City in Warren County, North Carolina. He was an active Republican and endorsed Richard Nixon for president that year, and the federal government, under President Nixon, supported Soul City. He became a state district court judge in 1990 and died on April 28, 1991.

Politician and attorney Floyd McKissick Jr., is his son.

== Early life and education ==
Floyd Bixler McKissick Sr. was born in Asheville, North Carolina, on March 9, 1922. He was the only son and one of four children of Ernest Boyce and Magnolia Thompson McKissick. He was named for a friend of his father, Floyd S. Bixler.

When he was 13 years of age, McKissick was a member of a Boy Scout troop. The troop sponsored a skating tournament on a street in Asheville, and McKissick was assigned to look after the younger participants. When one of the children strayed into an adjacent street, McKissick followed him and brought him back to the starting line. Two police officers who had witnessed this began chastising McKissick. When he tried to explain what had happened, one of the officers slapped him. He continued trying to explain what had occurred, and when the officer attempted to strike him with his nightstick, McKissick deflected the blow with his skates, knocking the stick out of the officer's hands. McKissick was arrested and put on trial two weeks later. McKissick's father lied to the judge, telling him he had punished his son for his behavior, and the case was dismissed. As a result of the incident, McKissick resolved to become a lawyer, and shortly thereafter joined the National Association for the Advancement of Colored People.

McKissick stated, "I've been active in North Carolina politics I think since I was about sixteen or seventeen, in high school." One of his early protests was in his hometown, Asheville, because the city refused to permit actor Paul Robeson to speak in the city auditorium in the 1930s. He graduated from high school in 1939, and in 1940 went to Atlanta to attend Morehouse College. After enrolling at Morehouse, McKissick joined the U.S. Army and during World War II he served in the European Theater as a sergeant. After the war, he returned to Morehouse College where he graduated in 1948.

== Early protest and political involvement ==
McKissick returned home from his service oversees inspired by postwar reconstruction efforts in Europe and increasingly aggrieved by blacks' lack of standing in American society, despite their contribution to the war effort. He participated in the 1947 Journey of Reconciliation, an attempt by activists to integrate interstate bus travel in the South. The following year he joined the Progressive Party supported Henry Wallace's 1948 presidential campaign.

In 1957, McKissick along with Nathan White Sr. headed the Durham Committee on Negro Affairs' Economic Committee, developed plans to boycott the Royal Ice Cream Parlor in Durham. Under the leadership of McKissick, twenty high school NAACP members acted in regular pickets outside of the Royal Ice Cream Parlor.

== Admittance to UNC Law School ==
After graduating from Morehouse in 1948, McKissick decided to pursue a career in law. He returned to his native state North Carolina, and applied to the University of North Carolina (UNC) School of Law. He was subsequently denied admission because of his race. After his denial, he enrolled in North Carolina College (NCC) School of Law, now North Carolina Central University (NCCU), in Durham, North Carolina, which was the law school for blacks. While in NCC's Law School, the NAACP accepted McKissick's case, and filed a lawsuit against UNC School of Law. Thurgood Marshall led the NAACP defense. In 1951, a ruling by the United States Court of Appeals allowed McKissick and three other students admission to UNC's School of Law. At the time of the ruling, McKissick had nearly finished his law degree from NCC, but he took courses at UNC School of Law during the summer of 1951. McKissick was in the first group of black students to be admitted at UNC School of Law.

== Law efforts ==
In 1955, McKissick established a law firm in Durham. He handled a variety of cases, including property and insurance disputes and criminal law, but focused on civil rights litigation. His clients included the first black undergraduates to attend UNC-Chapel Hill in 1955. He successfully defended sit-in protesters of the Durham's Royal Ice Cream Parlor in 1957, and the families who integrated Durham's city school system in 1959. The lead plaintiffs in the 1959 school desegregation case were his daughter, Joycelyn, and his wife, Evelyn. As a lawyer, McKissick's most publicized efforts involved a segregated black local in the Tobacco Workers International, an AFL-CIO member. McKissick pressed to have black workers admitted to the skilled scale without loss of their seniority rating.

== Involvement with CORE ==
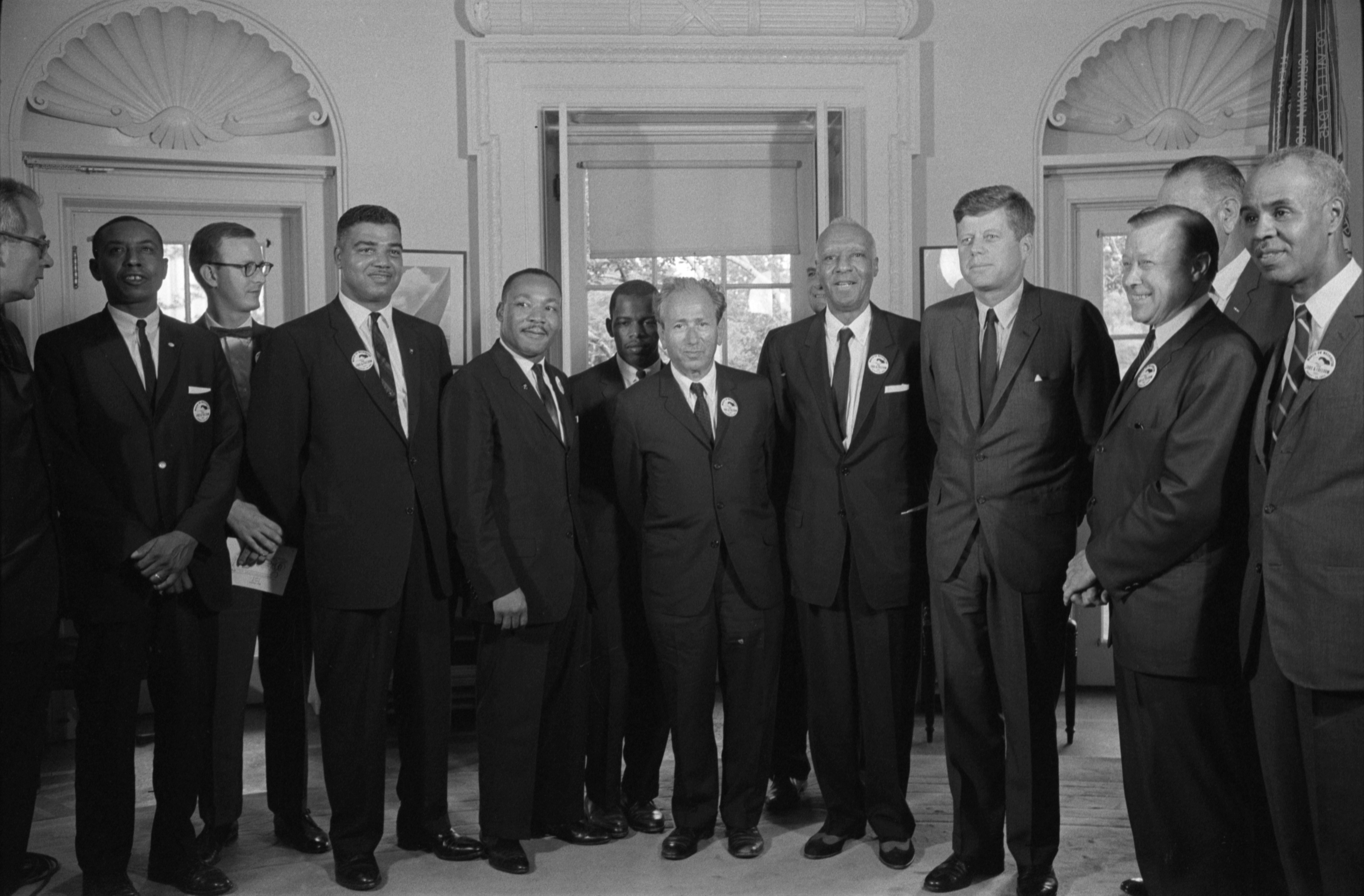
Civil rights leaders meeting with President John F. Kennedy in 1963. McKissick stands at the far left.

After the Greensboro sit-in at Woolworth's lunch counter on February 1, 1960, Gordon Carey and James T. McCain, CORE (Congress of Racial Equality) field secretaries, were sent to the Carolinas to help with the negotiating of department store owners and to spark interest in more sit-ins. Carey was introduced to McKissick during this time. "Carey helped McKissick and students organize the demonstrations that broke out on February 8 in Durham, and in the course of the next few weeks the two men travelled over the state setting up non-violent workshops." McKissick handled legal affairs for both the NAACP and CORE, but he withdrew from the NAACP. After leaving the NAACP and showing loyalty to CORE, he was elected to the CORE national chairmanship at the 1963 Convention.

CORE executive director James Farmer was under arrest at the time of the 1963 civil rights March on Washington for participating in protests in Louisiana, so McKissick attended the demonstration on his behalf. He delivered an address to the attendees originally prepared for Farmer, exhorting the audience to "play well your roles in your struggle for freedom. In the thousands of communities in which you have come throughout the land, act with valor and dignity, and act without fear." He also participated in a meeting between national civil rights leaders and President John F. Kennedy that day on Farmer's behalf.

McKissick replaced Farmer as head of CORE on January 3, 1966. The organization transformed from an interracial integrationist civil rights group pledged to uphold nonviolence into a militant and uncompromising group of the ideology of black power.

In 1966, James Meredith challenged America's social system of poverty, racial segregation, and white supremacy by vowing to walk alone from Memphis, Tennessee to Jackson, Mississippi. McKissick who had recently been elected head of CORE, promised to support Meredith in his journey. Along with Martin Luther King Jr. and Stokely Carmichael, McKissick assisted in leading a group of demonstrators the remaining 194 miles to Jackson, Mississippi. McKissick stated, "We issued the call to bring all the organizations together to continue the march at the spot where he fell." On the 17th day of their march, the protestors stopped in Canton, Mississippi and attempted to establish a camp for the night at a school. Local officials objected to their attempt to camp at the school, and dozens of state police officers were dispatched to confront the crowd. McKissick stood aboard a truck and attempted to rally the protestors to continue their demonstration, the police attacked, firing tear gas canisters and striking the protestors as they fled. Struck by a gas canister, McKissick lost his balance and fell off the truck, injuring his back. Following the incident, McKissick became a vocal supporter of black power, declaring that nonviolence had "outlived its usefulness" and that the civil rights movement was "dead".

McKissick's embrace of the black power movement and the subsequent perceived radicalization of CORE led to the resignation of many of the organization's white members and caused the Federal Bureau of Investigation to monitor McKissick. McKissick and Roy Innis, who at that time was the head of the Harlem chapter of CORE, appeared to be close allies, but there were underlying tensions. When McKissick left CORE in 1968, Innis took over. He became more strident in his rejection of nonviolence after Martin Luther King Jr. was assassinated, telling a journalist, "The next Negro to advocate nonviolence should be torn to bits by black people." In 1969, he published a book, 3/5ths of a man, which urged white people to accept political equality with minorities at the threat of violent revolution. He also stressed the importance of black economic autonomy from white society, arguing that, "Unless the Black Man attains economic independence, any 'political independence' will be an illusion". He promoted involvement in business as a means of enriching American blacks, which he termed "black entrepreneurship" and "black socialism".

== Soul City ==
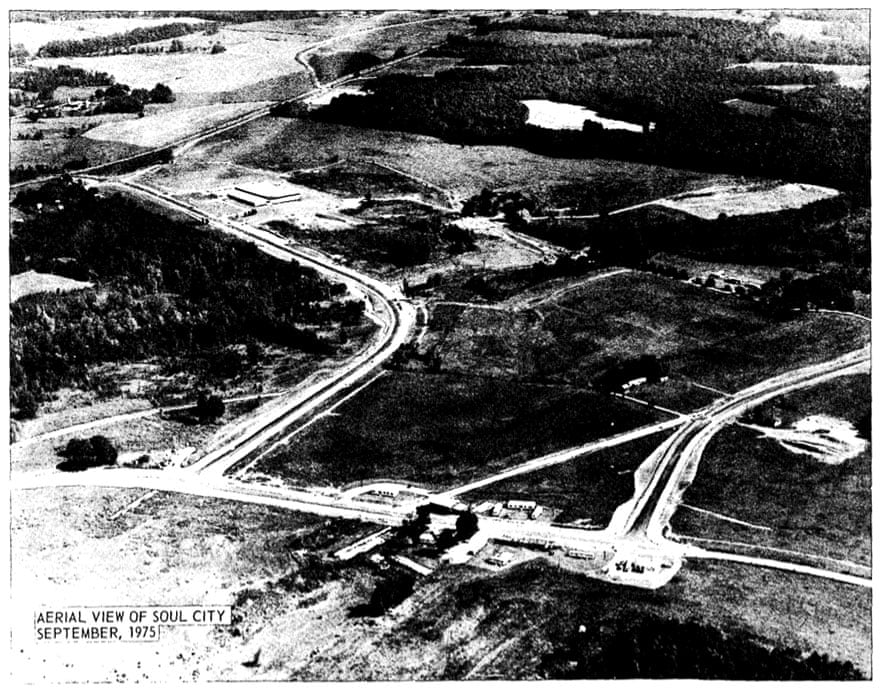
Soul City, 1975

Following his departure from CORE, McKissick founded McKissick Enterprises in August 1968, a company which was supposed to "create and distribute profits to millions of black Americans" by investing in and providing technical advice to black-run businesses. It invested in a variety of projects. Following the promulgation of the New Communities Act, McKissick tasked his staff with drafting a plan for a new city in the South, figuring that new planned community there would attract more interest.

McKissick launched a plan to build a new community, Soul City, in Warren County, North Carolina, on 500 acres of farmland. McKissick stated, "Soul City was an idea before the movement. Soul City actually started after World War II, in my mind. And it was first talked about when we saw the use of the Marshall Plan, and all like that. See, I've always been in real estate and I've always been a businessman." Soul City was supposed to reverse out-migration of minorities and the poor to urban areas. Soul City was a town intended for all, but placed emphasis on providing opportunities for minorities and the poor.

The venture received a $14 million bond issue guarantee from the Department of Housing and Urban Development through the New Communities Act of 1970 and a loan of $500,000 from the First Pennsylvania Bank. The state of North Carolina also gave $1.7 million and private donors gave about $1 million. With this funding, McKissick built a state-of-the art water system, a health care clinic, and a massive steel-and-glass factory named Soultech I. Soul City was projected to have 24,000 jobs and 44,000 inhabitants by the year 2004.

McKissick in 1983

Soul City, however, ran into difficulties and the project never developed as McKissick had hoped. In June 1980, the Soul City Corporation and the federal government reached an agreement that allowed the government to assume control the following January. Under the agreement, the company retained 88 acres of the project, including the site of a mobile home park and a 60,000-square-foot building that had served as the project's headquarters.

The Department of Housing & Urban Development paid off $10 million in loans and agreed to pay an additional $175,000 of the project's debts. In exchange, McKissick agreed to drop a lawsuit brought to block HUD from shutting down the project.

== Later life and death ==
In June 1990, Floyd McKissick was appointed a state district court judge in the Ninth Judicial District in North Carolina, by Republican Governor James G. Martin. Less than a year after being appointed, while also working as pastor of the First Baptist Church of Soul City, McKissick died of lung cancer at the age 69 on April 28, 1991. He was buried in Soul City. He was survived by his wife, the former Evelyn Williams, whom he married in 1942; a son, Floyd McKissick, Jr; and three daughters, Joycelyn, Andree, and Charmaine.

== Works cited ==
- Healy, Thomas (2021). Soul City: Race, Equality, and the Lost Dream of an American Utopia. New York City: Metropolitan Books. ISBN 9781627798624.
- Suttell, Brian (2023). Campus to Counter : Civil Rights Activism in Raleigh and Durham, North Carolina 1960–1963. Macon: Mercer University Press. ISBN 978-0-88146-877-9.
