= Dan Barrett (politician) =

American politician from North Carolina

Member of the North Carolina Senate from the 34th district
- In office August 23, 2017 – January 1, 2019
- Preceded by: Andrew Brock
- Succeeded by: Joyce Krawiec (Redistricting)

Personal details
- Party: Republican
- Education: Wake Forest University

C. Daniel Barrett is an attorney, legal author, and North Carolina political figure.

Barrett unsuccessfully sought the Republican nomination for governor in the 2004 election. His gubernatorial campaign was noted for its grassroots efforts, including Barrett personally walking across the length of the state from Murphy in the mountains to Manteo on the Outer Banks. Prior to that campaign, he served as Chairman of the Davie County Board of Commissioners.

In the 2008 general election, he ran for the North Carolina Court of Appeals, but was defeated by incumbent Judge Linda Stephens. He stated that he had a "conservative judicial philosophy." Dan Barrett's 2008 candidacy was endorsed by several leading North Carolina political figures, including former Governor James G. Martin and former Governor James Holshouser.

Barrett was again elected to the Davie County Commission in 2014. He was a candidate for the open 13th district US Congressional seat in 2016 but finished 8th out of 17 candidates in the June Primary.

In August 2017, Barrett was selected to fill the seat of Sen. Andrew Brock, who retired. He has since served as the State Senator from the 34th District representing Davie, Rowan, and Iredell counties.

As part of a long battle over redistricting, Barrett found himself in a different state Senate district, in which long-time Republican Sen. Joyce Krawiec also resided. Barrett ran against Krawiec in the 2018 primaries and narrowly lost, according to unofficial results.

Barrett is a graduate of Wake Forest University and Wake Forest University School of Law. Barrett is the author of a book on labor and employment law.

North Carolina Senate
Preceded by Andrew Brock	Member of the North Carolina Senate from the 34th district 2017–2019	Succeeded by Vickie Sawyer
