= Natalie Murdock =

American politician

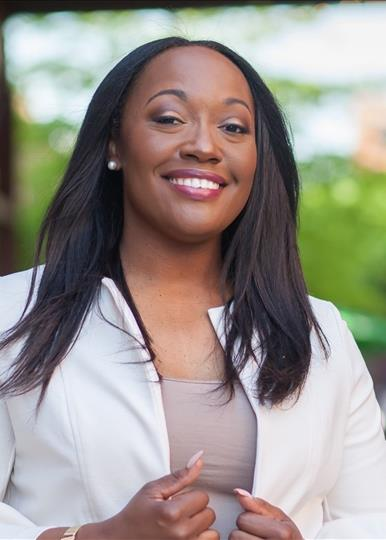

Member of the North Carolina Senate from the 20th district
- Incumbent
- Assumed office April 2, 2020
- Preceded by: Mickey Michaux

Personal details
- Born: January 25, 1984 (age 42) Greensboro, North Carolina, U.S.
- Party: Democratic
- Education: University of North Carolina, Chapel Hill (BA)
- Website: natalie-murdock.com

Natalie S. Murdock is an American politician and a Democratic member of the North Carolina Senate. Upon being sworn in, she became the first black woman under the age of 40 to serve in the North Carolina Senate.

== Early life ==
Murdock was born and raised in Greensboro, North Carolina, to Christine and Harold Murdock, a veteran and social worker who inspired her to pursue a career in politics. While attending James B. Dudley High School, she served as a Girl Scout, debate team member, and often attended NAACP meetings with her father. After graduating, she completed her Bachelor of Arts degree in Political Science and Communication Studies from the University of North Carolina at Chapel Hill and completed graduate work at Western Carolina University and Pfeiffer University.

== Career ==
Upon completing her education, Murdock was appointed the North Carolina Department of Justice's Deputy Director of Communications and principle and chief strategist for Murdock Anderson Consulting. She ran in the 2020 North Carolina state Senate primary to replace resigning member Mickey Michaux. Upon being sworn in on April 2, 2020, she became the first black woman under the age of 40 to serve in the North Carolina Senate.

North Carolina Senate
Preceded by Mickey Michaux	Member of the North Carolina Senate from the 20th district 2020-present	Incumbent
