= Hamilton C. Horton Jr. =

American politician

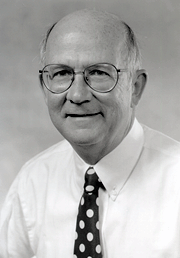

Member of the North Carolina Senate from the 31st district
- In office 2003–2006
- Preceded by: William N. "Bill" Martin
- Succeeded by: William B. Miller

Member of the North Carolina Senate from the 20th district
- In office 1995–2003 Serving with James Mark McDaniel, Linda Dew Garrou
- Preceded by: Ian Theodore Kaplan; Marvin Ward
- Succeeded by: Jeanne H. Lucas

Member of the North Carolina Senate from the 20th district
- In office 1973–1975 Serving with Harry Stroman Bagnal
- Preceded by: Luther J. Britt, Jr.
- Succeeded by: E. Lawrence Davis; Carl D. Totherow

Member of the North Carolina Senate from the 22nd district
- In office 1971–1973 Serving with Harry Stroman Bagnal
- Preceded by: Geraldine R. Nielson
- Succeeded by: Cy Bahakel; Eddie Knox; Herman A. Moore; Michael P. Mullins

Member of the North Carolina House of Representatives from the 30th district
- In office 1969–1971 Serving with Howard A. Jemison, Ed. M. McKnight, C. Dempsey McDaniel, Marshall Ted Wills
- Preceded by: Wesley Bailey; Claude M. Hamrick; Ronald K. Ingle
- Succeeded by: E. Lawrence Davis; Fred C. Farmer

Personal details
- Born: Hamilton Cowles "Ham" Horton Jr. August 6, 1931 Winston-Salem, North Carolina, U.S.
- Died: January 31, 2006 (aged 74) Winston-Salem, North Carolina, U.S.
- Party: Republican
- Spouse: Evelyn (m. 1963)
- Children: 1
- Education: University of North Carolina, Chapel Hill (AB, LLB)

Military service
- Allegiance: United States
- Branch/service: United States Navy
- Years of service: 1956–1960
- Rank: Lieutenant

Hamilton Cowles "Ham" Horton Jr. (August 6, 1931 – January 31, 2006) was a Republican member of the North Carolina General Assembly representing the state's thirty-first Senate district, including constituents in Forsyth county. Horton attended R. J. Reynolds High School from 1945 to 1949. He received his AB and LLB from UNC-Chapel Hill. He also served in the United States Navy as a Lieutenant from 1956 to 1960. He also served for one year in the North Carolina House of Representatives from 1969 to 1970. An attorney from Winston-Salem, North Carolina, Horton served a combined eight terms in the state Senate, from 1971-1975 and 1995-2006. He previously served as Chief of Staff to Senator Jesse Helms from 1977 to 1978. He ran for North Carolina's 5th congressional district in the 1978 election. He lost to incumbent, Stephen L. Neal.

Senator Horton had a cancerous kidney removed in September after the 2005 legislative session. He died of cancer on January 31, 2006, at age 74.

North Carolina House of Representatives
Preceded by Wesley Bailey; Claude M. Hamrick; Ronald K. Ingle	Member of the North Carolina House of Representatives from the 30th district 1969–1971; Served alongside: Howard A. Jemison, Ed. M. McKnight, C. Dempsey McDaniel, Marshall Ted Wills	Succeeded by E. Lawrence Davis; Fred C. Farmer
North Carolina Senate
Preceded by Geraldine R. Nielson	Member of the North Carolina Senate from the 22nd district 1971–1973; Served alongside: Harry Stroman Bagnal	Succeeded by Cy Bahakel; Eddie Knox; Herman A. Moore; Michael P. Mullins
Preceded by Luther J. Britt, Jr.	Member of the North Carolina Senate from the 20th district 1973–1975; Served alongside: Harry Stroman Bagnal	Succeeded by E. Lawrence Davis; Carl D. Totherow
Preceded by Ian Theodore Kaplan; Marvin Ward	Member of the North Carolina Senate from the 20th district 1995–2003; Served alongside: James Mark McDaniel, Linda Garrou	Succeeded by Jeanne H. Lucas
Preceded by William N. "Bill" Martin	Member of the North Carolina Senate from the 31st district 2003–2006	Succeeded by William B. Miller
