= 2020 United States House of Representatives elections in North Carolina =

- November 3, 2020

All 13 North Carolina seats to the United States House of Representatives
	Majority party	Minority party
Party	Republican	Democratic
Last election	10	3
Seats won	8	5
Seat change	▼2	▲2
Popular vote	2,631,336	2,660,535
Percentage	49.4%	50.0%
Swing	▼0.98%	▲1.61%

Republican
50–60%
60–70%
70–80%
80–90%
Democratic
50–60%
60–70%
70–80%
80–90%
90–100%

The 2020 United States House of Representatives elections in North Carolina were held on November 3, 2020, to elect the 13 U.S. representatives from the state of North Carolina, one from each of the state's 13 congressional districts. The elections coincided with the 2020 U.S. presidential election, as well as other elections to the House of Representatives, elections to the United States Senate, and various state and local elections.

North Carolina was one of two states in which the party that won the state's popular vote did not win a majority of seats in 2020, the other state being Arizona.

== 2020 North Carolina redistricting ==
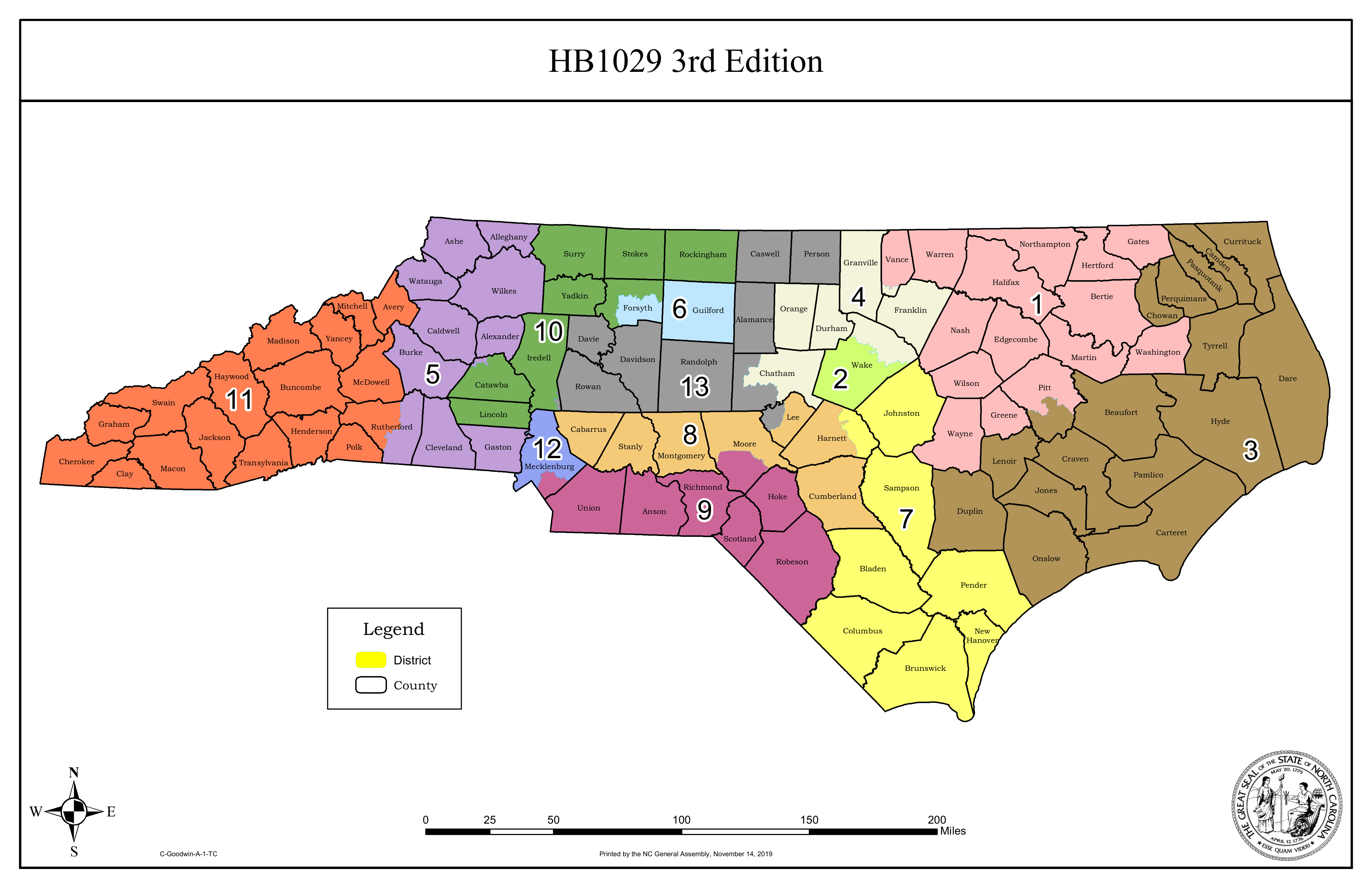
This image shows the 2020–2022 court-ordered NC Congressional districts.

Following a 2019 court order, the North Carolina General Assembly passed a bill with new Congressional districts for the 2020 elections. Among other changes, the 2nd and 6th districts were drawn to be more urban. Those changes led the two incumbents in these districts, George Holding and Mark Walker, respectively, to retire. Both were Republicans, and Democrats won the newly redrawn districts. One other seat was open, as former Rep. Mark Meadows had resigned to become White House Chief of Staff, but a fellow Republican held that seat for the party. Incumbents won all elections in which they ran, with the 8th district (Richard Hudson) seat having the closest margin of victory.

District	Old PVI	New PVI	Incumbent
1st	D+17	D+5	G. K. Butterfield
2nd	R+7	D+9	George Holding
3rd	R+12	R+12	Greg Murphy
4th	D+17	D+14	David Price
5th	R+10	R+18	Virginia Foxx
6th	R+10	D+9	Mark Walker
7th	R+9	R+11	David Rouzer
8th	R+8	R+5	Richard Hudson
9th	R+8	R+7	Dan Bishop
10th	R+12	R+20	Patrick McHenry
11th	R+14	R+9	(vacant)
12th	D+18	D+14	Alma Adams
13th	R+6	R+19	Ted Budd

== Results summary ==
=== Statewide ===
Party	Candi- dates	Votes		Seats		
Party	Candi- dates	No.	%	No.	+/–	%
Republican Party	12	2,631,336	49.413%	8	▼2	61.54%
Democratic Party	13	2,660,535	49.961%	5	▲2	38.76%
Libertarian Party	2	19,596	0.368%	0	Steady	0.00%
Constitution Party	1	7,555	0.142%	0	Steady	0.00%
Green Party	1	5,503	0.103%	0	Steady	0.00%
Write-in	1	720	0.014%	0	Steady	0.00%
Total	30	5,325,245	100.00%	13	Steady	100.00%

Popular vote
Democratic	49.961%
Republican	49.413%
Libertarian	0.368%
Constitution	0.142%
Green	0.103%
Write-in	0.014%

House seats
Republican	61.54%
Democratic	38.76%

=== District ===
Results of the 2020 United States House of Representatives elections in North Carolina by district:

District	Republican		Democratic		Others		Total		Result
District	Votes	%	Votes	%	Votes	%	Votes	%	Result
District 1	159,748	45.82%	188,870	54.18%	0	0.00%	348,618	100.00%	Democratic hold
District 2	172,544	34.83%	311,887	62.96%	10,914	2.20%	495,345	100.00%	Democratic gain
District 3	229,800	63.38%	132,752	36.62%	0	0.00%	362,552	100.00%	Republican hold
District 4	161,298	32.67%	332,421	67.33%	0	0.00%	493,719	100.00%	Democratic hold
District 5	257,843	66.93%	119,846	31.11%	7,555	1.96%	385,244	100.00%	Republican hold
District 6	153,598	37.73%	253,531	62.27%	0	0.00%	407,129	100.00%	Democratic gain
District 7	272,443	60.25%	179,045	39.59%	720	0.16%	452,208	100.00%	Republican hold
District 8	202,774	53.28%	177,781	46.72%	0	0.00%	380,555	100.00%	Republican hold
District 9	224,661	55.59%	179,463	44.41%	0	0.00%	404,124	100.00%	Republican hold
District 10	284,095	68.91%	128,189	31.09%	0	0.00%	412,284	100.00%	Republican hold
District 11	245,351	54.50%	190,609	42.34%	14,185	3.15%	450,145	100.00%	Republican hold
District 12	0	0.00%	341,457	100.00%	0	0.00%	341,457	100.00%	Democratic hold
District 13	267,181	68.18%	124,684	31.82%	0	0.00%	391,865	100.00%	Republican hold
Total	2,631,336	49.41%	2,660,535	49.96%	33,374	0.63%	5,325,245	100.00%	

== District 1 ==
2020 North Carolina's 1st congressional district election
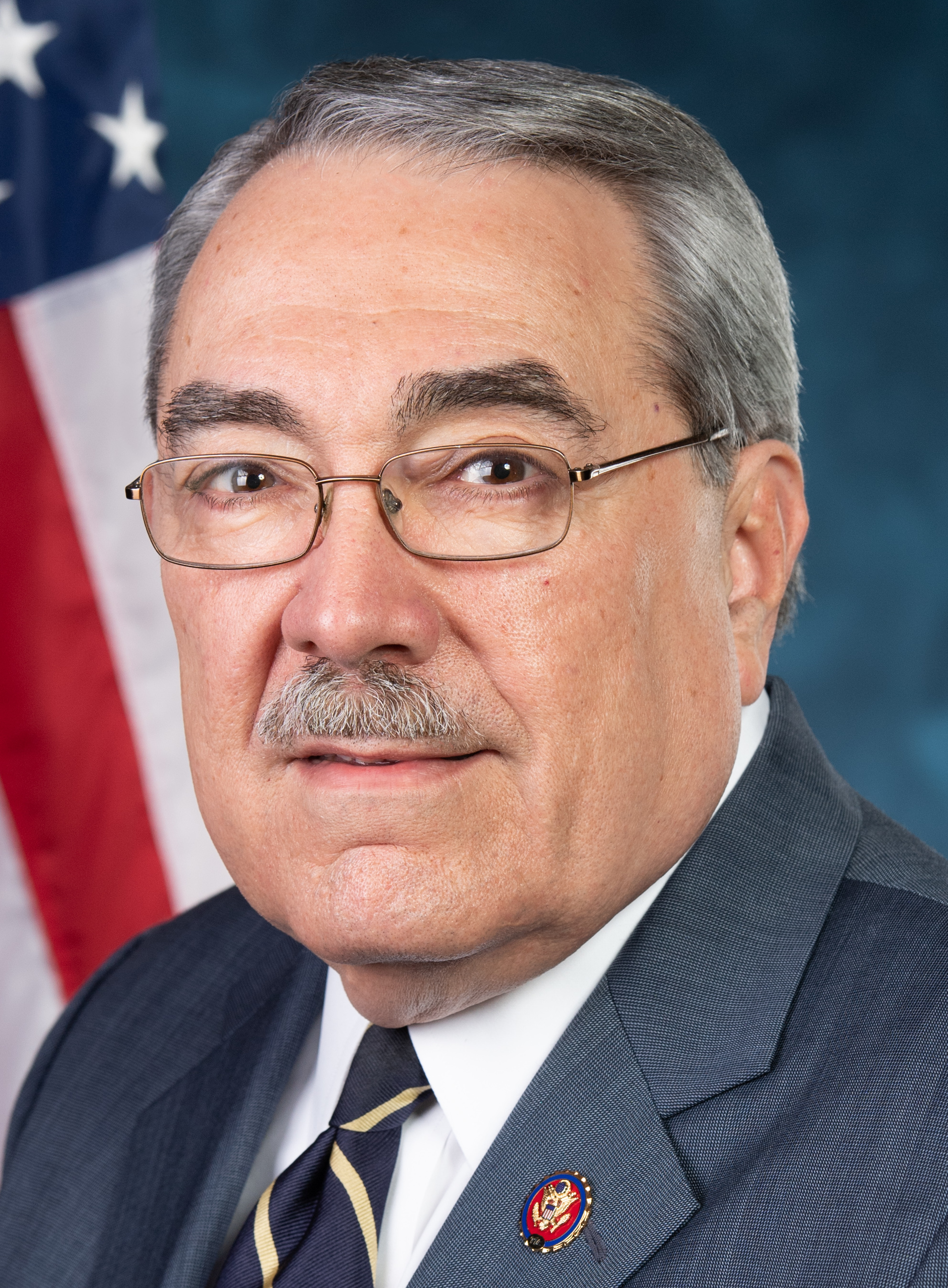

Nominee	G. K. Butterfield	Sandy Smith
Party	Democratic	Republican
Popular vote	188,870	159,748
Percentage	54.2%	45.8%
- Butterfield: 50–60% 60–70% 70–80% 80–90% >90% Smith: 50–60% 60–70% 70–80% 80–90% >90%
U.S. Representative before election
G. K. Butterfield
Democratic
Elected U.S. Representative
G. K. Butterfield
Democratic

The 1st district encompasses the Inner Banks, taking in Greenville, Henderson, and Roanoke Rapids. Following redistricting, the district remained relatively the same but lost its share of Durham and Granville counties. In its place it gained Nash, Wayne, and Greene counties. It also increased its share of Wilson and Pitt counties. The incumbent was Democrat G. K. Butterfield, who was re-elected with 69.9% of the vote in 2018.

=== Democratic primary ===
==== Candidates ====
===== Nominee =====
- G. K. Butterfield, incumbent U.S. representative

=== Republican primary ===
==== Candidates ====
===== Nominee =====
- Sandy Smith, business executive and farmer

===== Eliminated in primary =====
- Ethan Baca, businessman
- Jim Glisson
- Michele Nix, former vice chairwoman of the North Carolina Republican Party and candidate for North Carolina's 3rd congressional district in 2019

==== Primary results ====
Republican primary results
Party	Candidate	Votes	%
Republican	Sandy Smith	31,490	77.3
Republican	Michele Nix	4,030	9.9
Republican	Jim Glisson	3,031	7.4
Republican	Ethan Baca	2,206	5.5
Total votes		40,757	100.0

=== General election ===
==== Endorsements ====
G. K. Butterfield (D)

Labor unions

- AFL-CIO

==== Predictions ====
Source	Ranking	As of
The Cook Political Report	Safe D	July 2, 2020
Inside Elections	Safe D	June 2, 2020
Sabato's Crystal Ball	Safe D	July 2, 2020
Politico	Likely D	April 19, 2020
Daily Kos	Safe D	June 3, 2020
RCP	Safe D	June 9, 2020
Niskanen	Safe D	June 7, 2020
538	Likely D	November 3, 2020

==== Results ====
North Carolina's 1st congressional district, 2020
Party	Candidate	Votes	%
Democratic	G. K. Butterfield (incumbent)	188,870	54.2
Republican	Sandy Smith	159,748	45.8
Total votes		348,618	100.0
Democratic hold			

== District 2 ==
2020 North Carolina's 2nd congressional district election
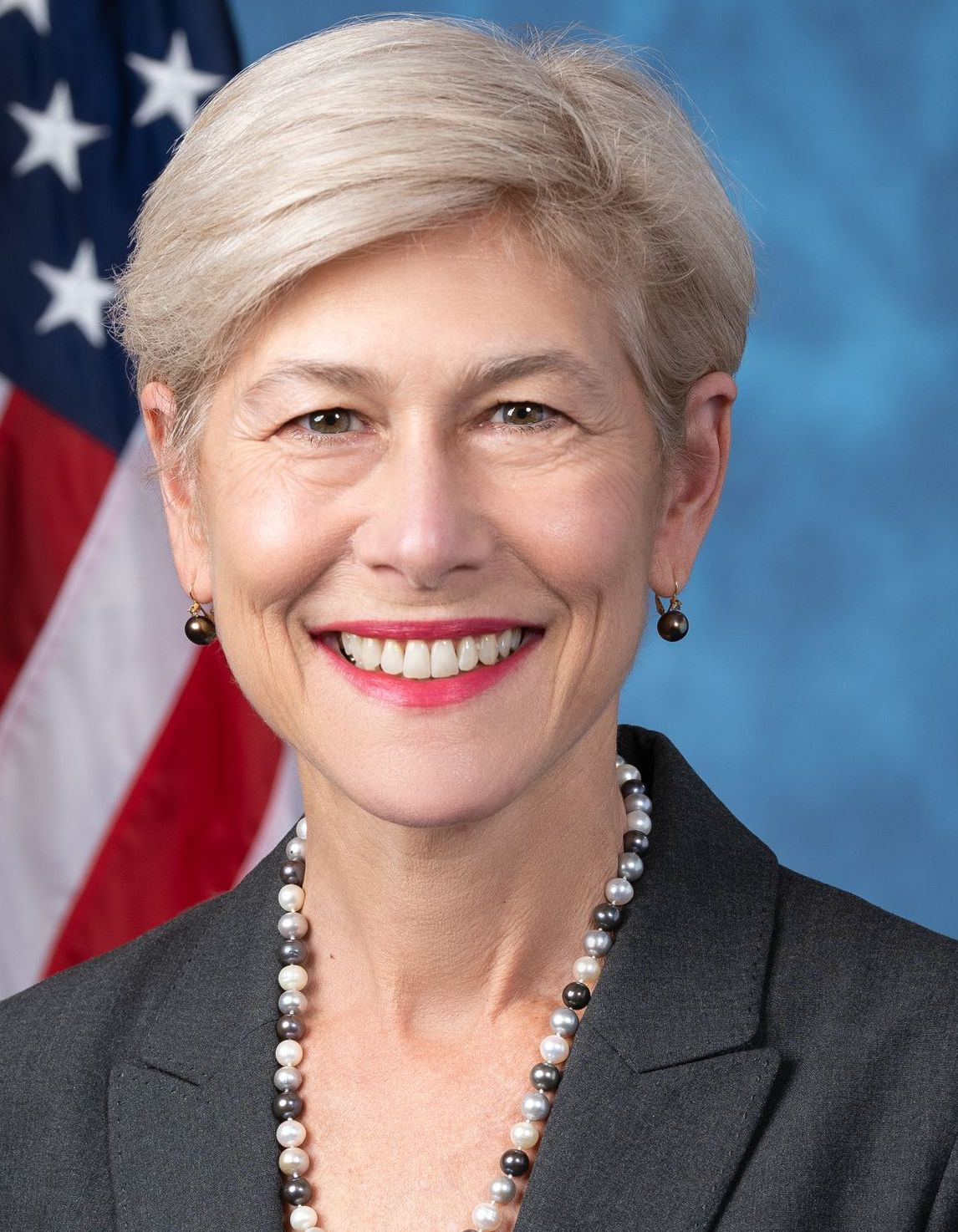

Nominee	Deborah Ross	Alan Swain
Party	Democratic	Republican
Popular vote	311,887	172,544
Percentage	63.0%	34.8%
- Precinct results Ross: 40–50% 50–60% 60–70% 70–80% 80–90% >90% Swain: 40–50% 50–60% 60–70%
U.S. Representative before election
George Holding
Republican
Elected U.S. Representative
Deborah Ross
Democratic

The 2nd district takes in much of Wake County portion of the Research Triangle region. Following redistricting, the 2nd district is now located entirely in Wake County, taking in Raleigh, Cary, Garner, Apex, Holly Springs, Fuquay-Varina, and Morrisville. Wake Forest and Rocky Mount as well as the rural parts of the district were removed from the district. The incumbent was Republican George Holding, who was re-elected with 51.3% of the vote in 2018. On December 6, 2019, Holding announced he would not seek re-election, after his congressional district was drawn to be more favorable to the Democratic Party.

=== Republican primary ===
==== Candidates ====
===== Nominee =====
- Alan Swain, attorney

===== Declined =====
- George Holding, incumbent U.S. representative

=== Democratic primary ===
==== Candidates ====
===== Nominee =====
- Deborah Ross, former state representative and nominee for U.S. Senate in 2016

===== Eliminated in primary =====
- Monika Johnson-Hostler, Wake County school board-member
- Ollie Nelson, retired U.S. Marine, educator, and pastor
- Andy Terrell, former Obama administration official

===== Withdrawn =====
- Scott Cooper, nonprofit director and former U.S. Marine Corps lieutenant colonel

===== Declined =====
- Sam Searcy, state senator

==== Endorsements ====
Monika Johnson-Hostler

Organizations

- Equality North Carolina (also endorsed Deborah Ross and Andy Terrell)
Deborah Ross

Labor unions

- North Carolina State AFL-CIO
- State Employees Association of North Carolina, Service Employees International Union Local 2008

Organizations

- Black Economic Alliance
- EMILY's List
- Equality North Carolina (also endorsed Andy Terrell and Monika Johnson-Hostler)
- Giffords PAC
- Human Rights Campaign
- League of Conservation Voters Action Fund
- NARAL Pro-Choice America
- Planned Parenthood Action Fund
- Replacements, Ltd. PAC
- Sierra Club

Newspapers

- Indy Week
- The News and Observer
Andy Terrell
- Equality North Carolina (also endorsed Deborah Ross and Monika Johnson-Hostler)
Scott Cooper (withdrawn)

Organizations

- VoteVets.org

==== Polling ====
Poll source	Date(s) administered	Sample size (Note: Key: A – all adults RV – registered voters LV – likely voters V – unclear)	Margin of error	Monika Johnson-Holster	Ollie Nelson	Deborah Ross	Andrew Terrell	Undecided
ALG Research (D) (Note: Internal poll sponsored by Deborah K. Ross)	January 7–12, 2020	501 (LV)	± 4.4%	6%	2%	40%	1%	50%

==== Primary results ====
Democratic primary results
Party	Candidate	Votes	%
Democratic	Deborah Ross	103,574	69.9
Democratic	Monika Johnson-Hostler	33,369	22.5
Democratic	Andy Terrell	8,666	5.8
Democratic	Ollie Nelson	2,677	1.8
Total votes		148,286	100.0

=== Libertarian primary ===
==== Candidates ====
===== Nominee =====
- Jeff Matemu, attorney and candidate for North Carolina's 2nd congressional district in 2018

=== General election ===
==== Predictions ====
Source	Ranking	As of
The Cook Political Report	Likely D (flip)	July 2, 2020
Inside Elections	Likely D (flip)	June 2, 2020
Sabato's Crystal Ball	Safe D (flip)	July 2, 2020
Politico	Safe D (flip)	April 19, 2020
Daily Kos	Safe D (flip)	June 3, 2020
RCP	Safe D (flip)	June 9, 2020
Niskanen	Safe D (flip)	June 7, 2020
538	Solid D (flip)	November 3, 2020

==== Results ====
North Carolina's 2nd congressional district, 2020
Party	Candidate	Votes	%
Democratic	Deborah Ross	311,887	63.0
Republican	Alan Swain	172,544	34.8
Libertarian	Jeff Matemu	10,914	2.2
Total votes		495,345	100.0
Democratic gain from Republican			

== District 3 ==
2020 North Carolina's 3rd congressional district election
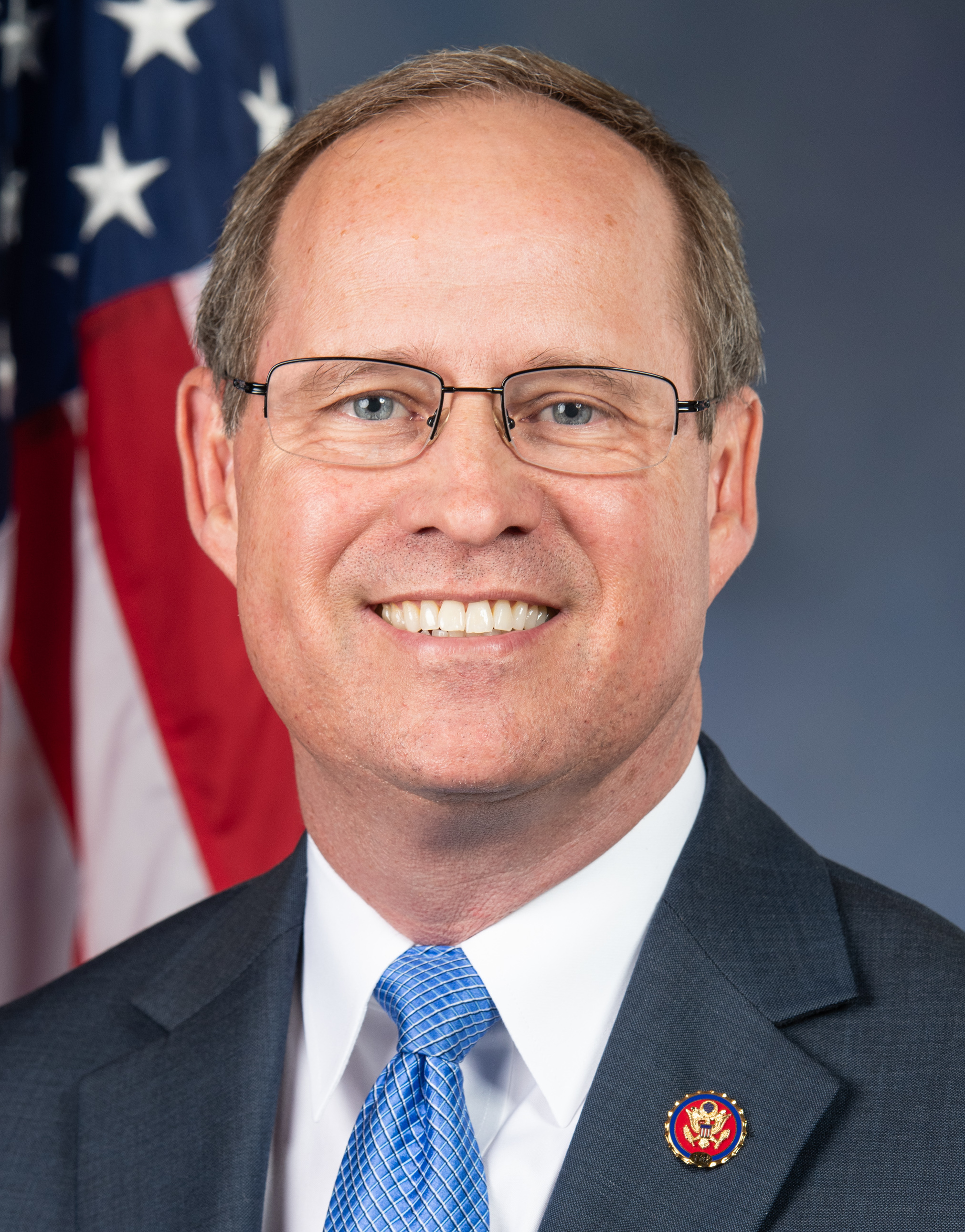

Nominee	Greg Murphy	Daryl Farrow
Party	Republican	Democratic
Popular vote	229,800	132,752
Percentage	63.4%	36.6%
- Murphy: 50–60% 60–70% 70–80% 80–90% >90% Farrow: 50–60% 60–70% 70–80% 80–90% >90%
U.S. Representative before election
Greg Murphy
Republican
Elected U.S. Representative
Greg Murphy
Republican

The 3rd district is located on the Eastern North Carolina shore and covers the Outer Banks and counties along the Pamlico Sound. Republican Walter B. Jones Jr., who was re-elected unopposed in 2018, died on February 10, 2019, and a special election was held to fill the vacancy. The incumbent was Republican Greg Murphy, who won the special election with 61.7% of the vote. The district remained relatively unchanged following redistricting.

=== Republican primary ===
==== Candidates ====
===== Nominee =====
- Greg Murphy, incumbent U.S. representative

=== Democratic primary ===
==== Candidates ====
===== Nominee =====
- Daryl Farrow

=== General election ===
==== Predictions ====
Source	Ranking	As of
The Cook Political Report	Safe R	July 2, 2020
Inside Elections	Safe R	June 2, 2020
Sabato's Crystal Ball	Safe R	July 2, 2020
Politico	Safe R	April 19, 2020
Daily Kos	Safe R	June 3, 2020
RCP	Safe R	June 9, 2020
Niskanen	Safe R	June 7, 2020
538	Safe R	November 3, 2020

==== Results ====
North Carolina's 3rd congressional district, 2020
Party	Candidate	Votes	%
Republican	Greg Murphy (incumbent)	229,800	63.4
Democratic	Daryl Farrow	132,752	36.6
Total votes		362,552	100.0
Republican hold			

== District 4 ==
2020 North Carolina's 4th congressional district election
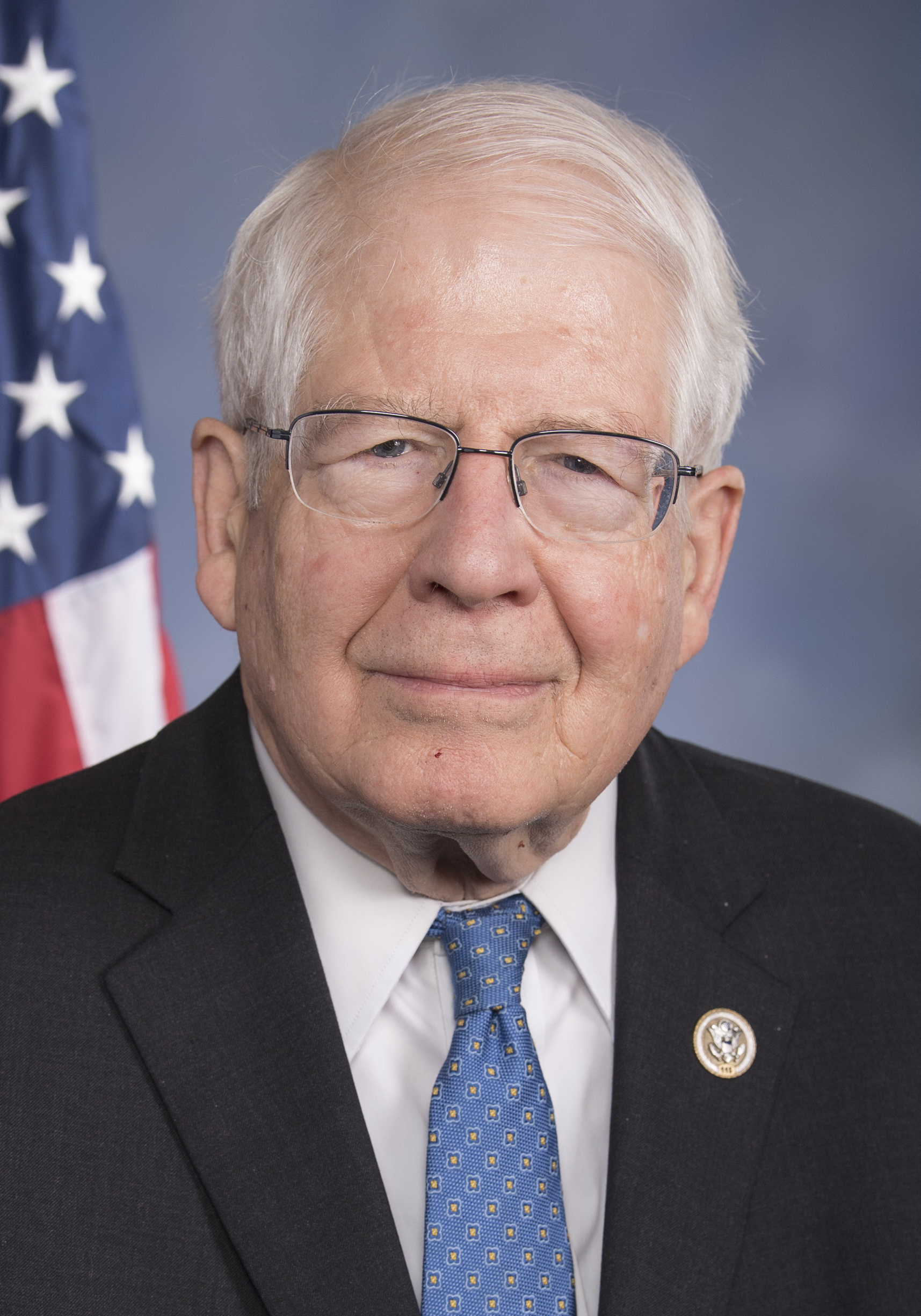

Nominee	David Price	Robert Thomas
Party	Democratic	Republican
Popular vote	332,421	161,298
Percentage	67.3%	32.7%
- Precinct results Price: 50–60% 60–70% 70–80% 80–90% >90% Thomas: 50–60% 60–70% 70–80%
U.S. Representative before election
David Price
Democratic
Elected U.S. Representative
David Price
Democratic

The 4th district takes in the part of the Research Triangle area not located in Wake County including Chapel Hill and Durham. Redistricting resulted in it losing its share of Raleigh, instead picking up northern Wake County, taking in Wake Forest, Zebulon, Rolesville, and Knightdale, as well as Chatham County, Durham County, Franklin County and Granville County. The incumbent was Democrat David Price, who was re-elected with 72.4% of the vote in 2018.

=== Democratic primary ===
==== Candidates ====
===== Nominee =====
- David Price, incumbent U.S. representative

===== Eliminated in primary =====
- Daniel Ulysses Lockwood, web & graphic designer and developer

==== Endorsements ====
Daniel Ulysses Lockwood

Organizations

- Democratic Socialists of America - Chapelboro chapter
- Democratic Socialists of America - Piedmont chapter
- Our Revolution - Triangle chapter
- Rose Caucus
David Price

Organizations

- Equality North Carolina
- Planned Parenthood Action Fund
- Sierra Club

==== Primary results ====
Democratic primary results
Party	Candidate	Votes	%
Democratic	David Price (incumbent)	153,322	86.7
Democratic	Daniel Ulysses Lockwood	23,564	13.3
Total votes		176,886	100.0

=== Republican primary ===
==== Candidates ====
===== Nominee =====
- Robert Thomas, attorney

===== Eliminated in primary =====
- Debesh Sarkar, structural engineer
- Nasir Shaikh
- Steve Von Loor, nominee for North Carolina's 4th congressional district in 2018

==== Primary results ====
Republican primary results
Party	Candidate	Votes	%
Republican	Robert Thomas	17,474	48.3
Republican	Debesh Sarkar	8,320	23.0
Republican	Steve Von Loor	6,283	17.3
Republican	Nasir Shaikh	4,127	11.4
Total votes		36,159	100.0

=== General election ===
==== Endorsements ====
David Price (D)

Labor unions

- AFL-CIO

==== Predictions ====
Source	Ranking	As of
The Cook Political Report	Safe D	July 2, 2020
Inside Elections	Safe D	June 2, 2020
Sabato's Crystal Ball	Safe D	July 2, 2020
Politico	Safe D	April 19, 2020
Daily Kos	Safe D	June 3, 2020
RCP	Safe D	June 9, 2020
Niskanen	Safe D	June 7, 2020
538	Safe D	November 3, 2020

==== Results ====
North Carolina's 4th congressional district, 2020
Party	Candidate	Votes	%
Democratic	David Price (incumbent)	332,421	67.3
Republican	Robert Thomas	161,298	32.7
Total votes		493,719	100.0
Democratic hold			

== District 5 ==
2020 North Carolina's 5th congressional district election
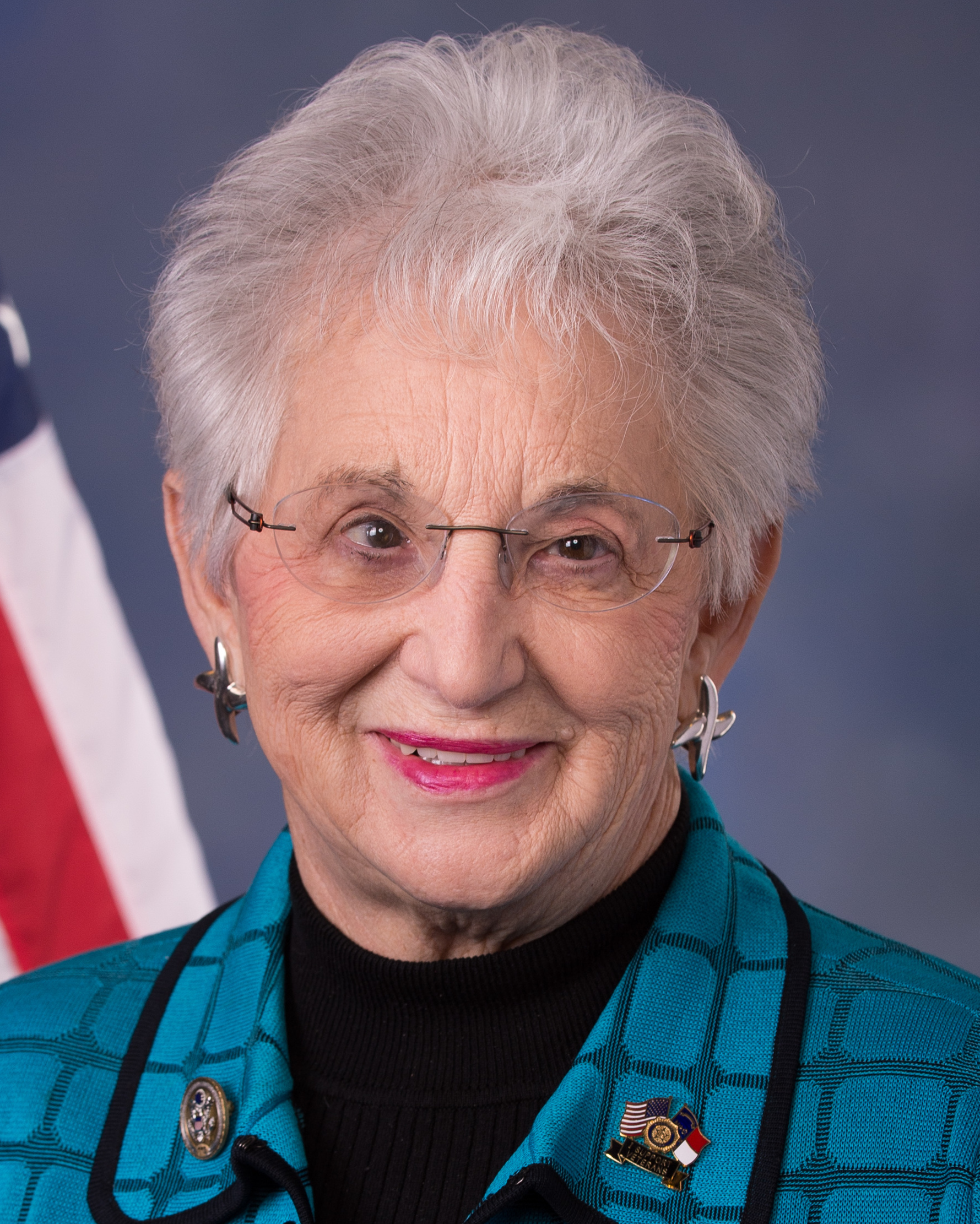

Nominee	Virginia Foxx	David Brown
Party	Republican	Democratic
Popular vote	257,843	119,846
Percentage	66.9%	31.1%
- Precinct results Foxx: 40–50% 50–60% 60–70% 70–80% 80–90% Brown: 50–60% 60–70% 70–80% >90%
U.S. Representative before election
Virginia Foxx
Republican
Elected U.S. Representative
Virginia Foxx
Republican

The 5th district is based in mostly rural mountainous areas of northwestern North Carolina. Redistricting moved the district to the west and south, resulting in it losing the city of Winston-Salem and picking up many rural counties in western North Carolina. It lost its share of Surry, Stokes, Yadkin, and Forsyth counties to the 10th district. It also lost Avery County to the 11th district. In its place it picked up Gaston County, Cleveland County, part of Rutherford County, as well as Burke and Caldwell counties. A small portion in northwest Catawba County is also in the district. The incumbent was Republican Virginia Foxx, who was re-elected with 57.0% of the vote in 2018.

=== Republican primary ===
==== Candidates ====
===== Nominee =====
- Virginia Foxx, incumbent U.S. representative

===== Declined =====
- Tracy Philbeck, Gaston County commissioner

==== Endorsements ====
Virginia Foxx

Organizations

- Maggie's List

=== Democratic primary ===
==== Candidates ====
===== Nominee =====
- David Brown, IT consultant and nominee for North Carolina's 10th congressional district in 2018

===== Eliminated in primary =====
- Eric Hughes

==== Primary results ====
Democratic primary results
Party	Candidate	Votes	%
Democratic	David Brown	34,339	68.0
Democratic	Eric Hughes	16,139	32.0
Total votes		50,478	100.0

=== Third parties ===
==== Candidates ====
===== Declared =====
- Jeff Gregory (Constitution)

=== General election ===
==== Endorsements ====
David Brown (D)

Organizations

- Equality North Carolina

==== Predictions ====
Source	Ranking	As of
The Cook Political Report	Safe R	July 2, 2020
Inside Elections	Safe R	June 2, 2020
Sabato's Crystal Ball	Safe R	July 2, 2020
Politico	Safe R	April 19, 2020
Daily Kos	Safe R	June 3, 2020
RCP	Safe R	June 9, 2020
Niskanen	Safe R	June 7, 2020
538	Safe R	November 3, 2020

==== Results ====
North Carolina's 5th congressional district, 2020
Party	Candidate	Votes	%
Republican	Virginia Foxx (incumbent)	257,843	66.9
Democratic	David Brown	119,846	31.1
Constitution	Jeff Gregory	7,555	2.0
Total votes		385,244	100.0
Republican hold			

== District 6 ==
2020 North Carolina's 6th congressional district election
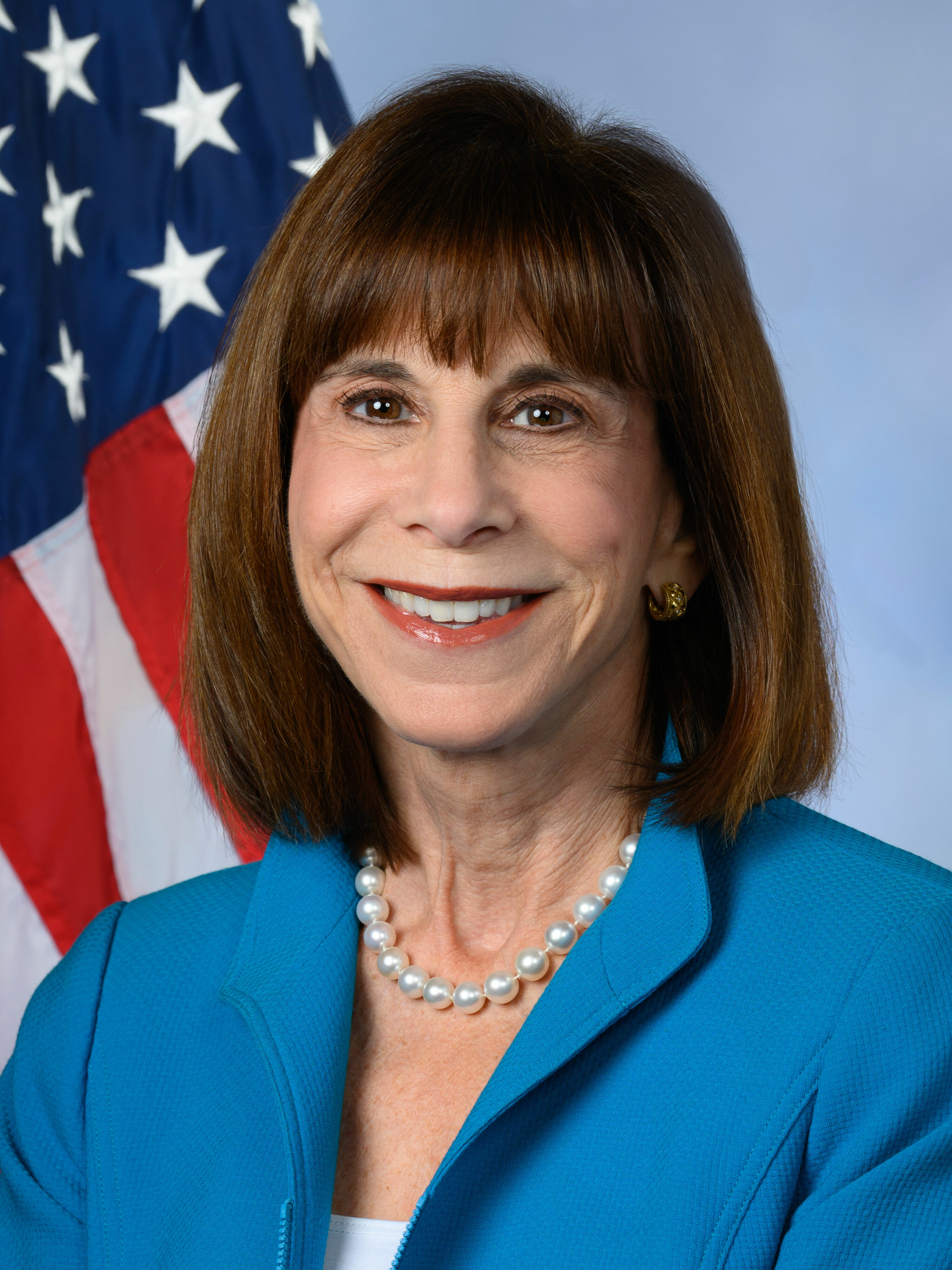

Nominee	Kathy Manning	Lee Haywood
Party	Democratic	Republican
Popular vote	253,531	153,598
Percentage	62.3%	37.7%
- Precinct results Manning: 50–60% 60–70% 70–80% 80–90% >90% Haywood: 50–60% 60–70% 70–80% 80–90%
U.S. Representative before election
Mark Walker
Republican
Elected U.S. Representative
Kathy Manning
Democratic

Following redistricting, the 6th district now encompasses all of Guilford County, including Greensboro as well as taking in Winston-Salem from neighboring Forsyth County. Most of the district's rural portions were moved to the 10th and the 13th districts. The incumbent was Republican Mark Walker, who was re-elected with 56.5% of the vote in 2018. On December 16, 2019, Walker announced he would not seek re-election, citing his redrawn district becoming significantly more Democratic as his primary reason.

=== Republican primary ===
==== Candidates ====
===== Nominee =====
- Lee Haywood, chairman of the 6th district North Carolina Republican Party

===== Eliminated in primary =====
- Laura Pichardo, accounts-payable analyst

===== Declined =====
- Mark Walker, incumbent U.S. representative

==== Primary results ====
Republican primary results
Party	Candidate	Votes	%
Republican	Lee Haywood	28,842	73.3
Republican	Laura Pichardo	10,529	26.7
Total votes		39,371	100.0

=== Democratic primary ===
==== Candidates ====
===== Nominee =====
- Kathy Manning, lawyer and nominee for North Carolina's 13th congressional district in 2018

===== Eliminated in primary =====
- Bruce Davis, former Guilford County commissioner
- Rhonda Foxx, former chief of staff to U.S. Representative Alma Adams
- Ed Hanes, former state representative
- Derwin Montgomery, state representative

===== Withdrawn =====
- Angela Flynn, lay minister (endorsed Kathy Manning)

==== Endorsements ====
Rhonda Foxx

Federal politicians

- Kirsten Gillibrand, U.S. senator from New York

Organizations

- Higher Heights for America PAC
- IVYPAC
Kathy Manning

Labor unions

- North Carolina State AFL-CIO

Organizations

- EMILY's List
- Equality North Carolina
- Giffords Pac
- Human Rights Campaign
- League of Conservation Voters Action Fund
- NARAL Pro-Choice America
- Planned Parenthood Action Fund
- Replacements, Ltd. PAC
- Sierra Club

==== Primary results ====
Democratic primary results
Party	Candidate	Votes	%
Democratic	Kathy Manning	56,986	48.3
Democratic	Rhonda Foxx	23,506	19.9
Democratic	Bruce Davis	17,731	15.0
Democratic	Derwin Montgomery	14,705	12.5
Democratic	Ed Hanes	5,067	4.3
Total votes		117,995	100.0

=== Third parties ===
==== Candidates ====
===== Declared =====
- Jennyfer Bucardo (independent)

=== General election ===
==== Predictions ====
Source	Ranking	As of
The Cook Political Report	Likely D (flip)	July 2, 2020
Inside Elections	Likely D (flip)	June 2, 2020
Sabato's Crystal Ball	Safe D (flip)	July 2, 2020
Politico	Safe D (flip)	April 19, 2020
Daily Kos	Safe D (flip)	June 3, 2020
RCP	Safe D (flip)	June 9, 2020
Niskanen	Safe D (flip)	June 7, 2020
538	Safe D (flip)	November 3, 2020

==== Results ====
North Carolina's 6th congressional district, 2020
Party	Candidate	Votes	%
Democratic	Kathy Manning	253,531	62.3
Republican	Lee Haywood	153,598	37.7
Total votes		407,129	100.0
Democratic gain from Republican			

== District 7 ==
2020 North Carolina's 7th congressional district election
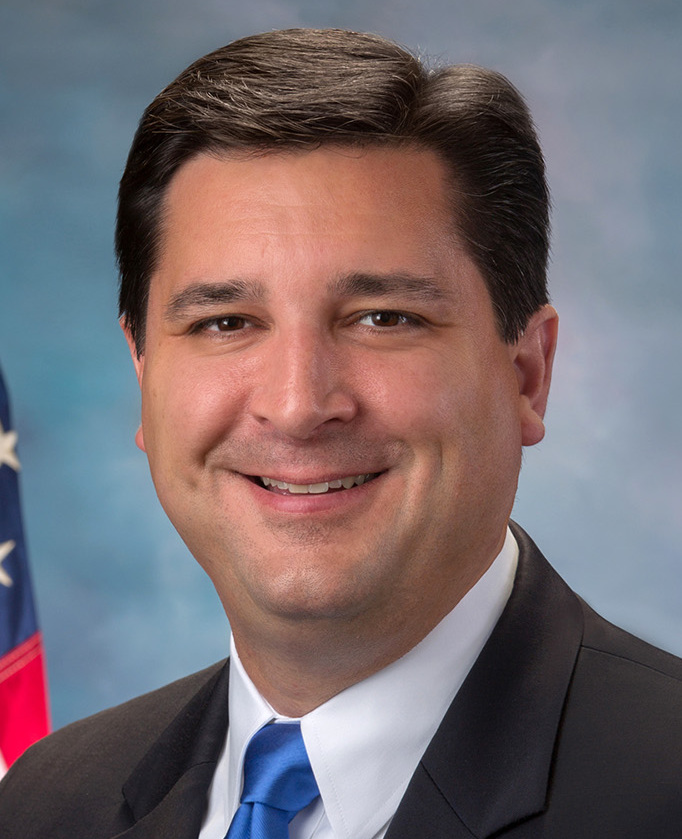

Nominee	David Rouzer	Chris Ward
Party	Republican	Democratic
Popular vote	272,443	179,045
Percentage	60.2%	39.6%
- Precinct results Rouzer: 50–60% 60–70% 70–80% 80–90% >90% Ward: 50–60% 60–70% 70–80% 80–90%
U.S. Representative before election
David Rouzer
Republican
Elected U.S. Representative
David Rouzer
Republican

The 7th district is located in southeastern North Carolina, taking in Wilmington, as well as stretching into the southern exurbs of Raleigh. After the district was redrawn, it lost its share of Wayne and Duplin counties, while gaining all of Johnston and Bladen counties and a small part of eastern Harnett County. The incumbent was Republican David Rouzer, who was re-elected with 55.5% of the vote in 2018.

=== Republican primary ===
==== Candidates ====
===== Nominee =====
- David Rouzer, incumbent U.S. representative

===== Disqualified =====
- Pete D'Abrosca, blogger

=== Democratic primary ===
==== Candidates ====
===== Nominee =====
- Chris Ward, pharmaceutical sales executive

===== Eliminated in primary =====
- Robert Colon, wastewater manager
- Mark Judson, retired U.S. Army officer and businessman

==== Primary results ====
Democratic primary results
Party	Candidate	Votes	%
Democratic	Chris Ward	35,224	46.3
Democratic	Mark Judson	27,640	36.4
Democratic	Robert Colon	13,183	17.3
Total votes		76,047	100.0

=== General election ===
==== Predictions ====
Source	Ranking	As of
The Cook Political Report	Safe R	July 2, 2020
Inside Elections	Safe R	June 2, 2020
Sabato's Crystal Ball	Safe R	July 2, 2020
Politico	Safe R	April 19, 2020
Daily Kos	Safe R	June 3, 2020
RCP	Safe R	June 9, 2020
Niskanen	Safe R	June 7, 2020
538	Safe R	November 3, 2020

==== Results ====
North Carolina's 7th congressional district, 2020
Party	Candidate	Votes	%
Republican	David Rouzer (incumbent)	272,443	60.2
Democratic	Chris Ward	179,045	39.6
Write-in		720	0.2
Total votes		452,208	100.0
Republican hold			

== District 8 ==
2020 North Carolina's 8th congressional district election
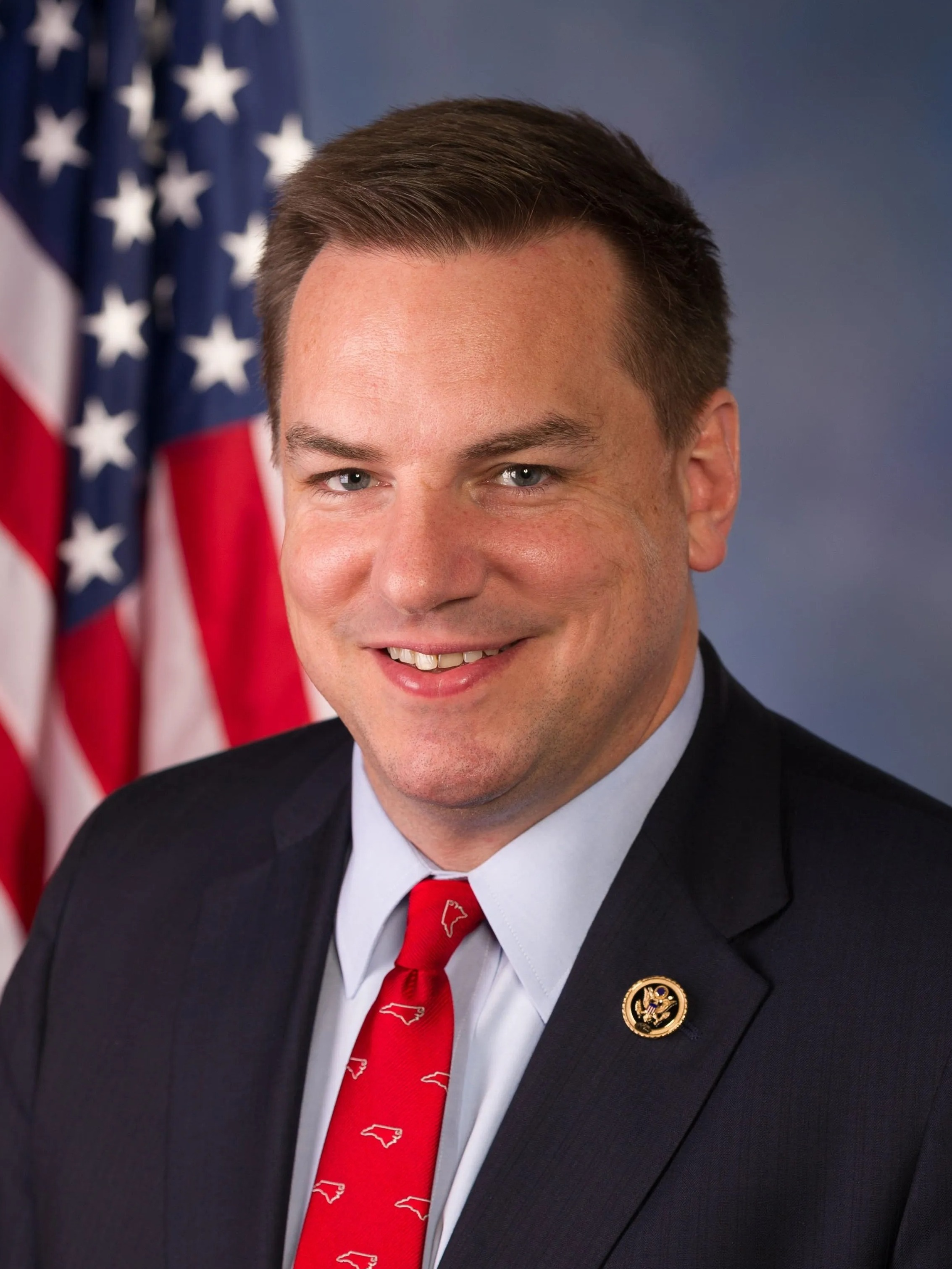

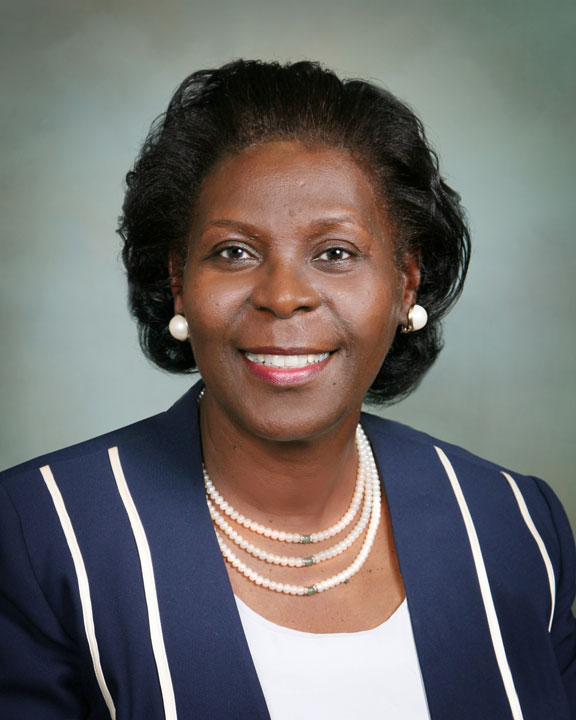
Nominee	Richard Hudson	Patricia Timmons-Goodson
Party	Republican	Democratic
Popular vote	202,774	177,781
Percentage	53.3%	46.7%
- Precinct results Hudson: 50–60% 60–70% 70–80% 80–90% >90% Timmons-Goodson: 50–60% 60–70% 70–80% 80–90% >90%
U.S. Representative before election
Richard Hudson
Republican
Elected U.S. Representative
Richard Hudson
Republican

The 8th district spans from the Charlotte exurbs of Concord and Kannapolis into Fayetteville, including China Grove, Albemarle, Troy, Pinehurst, Raeford, and Spring Lake. Redistricting resulted in the 8th district losing its share of Rowan County, Hoke County and southern Moore County, while gaining all of Cumberland County, western Harnett County and most of Lee County. The incumbent was Republican Richard Hudson, who was re-elected with 55.3% of the vote in 2018.

=== Republican primary ===
==== Candidates ====
===== Nominee =====
- Richard Hudson, incumbent U.S. representative

=== Democratic primary ===
==== Candidates ====
===== Nominee =====
- Patricia Timmons-Goodson, vice chair of the United States Commission on Civil Rights and former associate justice of the North Carolina Supreme Court

=== General election ===
==== Endorsements ====
Patricia Timmons-Goodson (D)

Federal politicians

- Joe Biden, 46th vice president of the United States and 2020 Democratic nominee for President
- Barack Obama, 44th president of the United States

Labor unions

- AFL-CIO

Organizations

- Emily's List
- End Citizens United
- Equality NC
- Giffords
- League of Conservation Voters Action Fund
- Let America Vote
- Sierra Club

==== Predictions ====
Source	Ranking	As of
The Cook Political Report	Lean R	July 17, 2020
Inside Elections	Tilt R	October 28, 2020
Sabato's Crystal Ball	Lean R	July 23, 2020
Politico	Tossup	November 2, 2020
Daily Kos	Lean R	October 19, 2020
RCP	Likely R	June 9, 2020
Niskanen	Lean R	June 7, 2020
538	Lean R	November 3, 2020

==== Polling ====
Poll source	Date(s) administered	Sample size	Margin of error	Richard Hudson (R)	Patricia Timmons-Goodson (D)	Undecided
DCCC Targeting & Analytics Department (D) (Note: Poll conducted by the DCCC.)	October 5–6, 2020	433 (LV)	± 4.7%	42%	45%	13%
Brilliant Corners Research & Strategies (D) (Note: Poll conducted for the Timmons-Goodson campaign.)	September 28, 2020	612 (LV)	± 4%	44%	42%	–
Brilliant Corners Research & Strategies (D)	July 23–30, 2020	800 (LV)	± 3.5%	43%	41%	–

Hypothetical polling

Poll source	Date(s) administered	Sample size	Margin of error	Generic Republican	Generic Democrat	Undecided
DCCC Targeting & Analytics Department (D)	October 5–6, 2020	433 (LV)	± 4.7%	45%	47%	8%

==== Results ====
North Carolina's 8th congressional district, 2020
Party	Candidate	Votes	%
Republican	Richard Hudson (incumbent)	202,774	53.3
Democratic	Patricia Timmons-Goodson	177,781	46.7
Total votes		380,555	100.0
Republican hold			

== District 9 ==
2020 North Carolina's 9th congressional district election
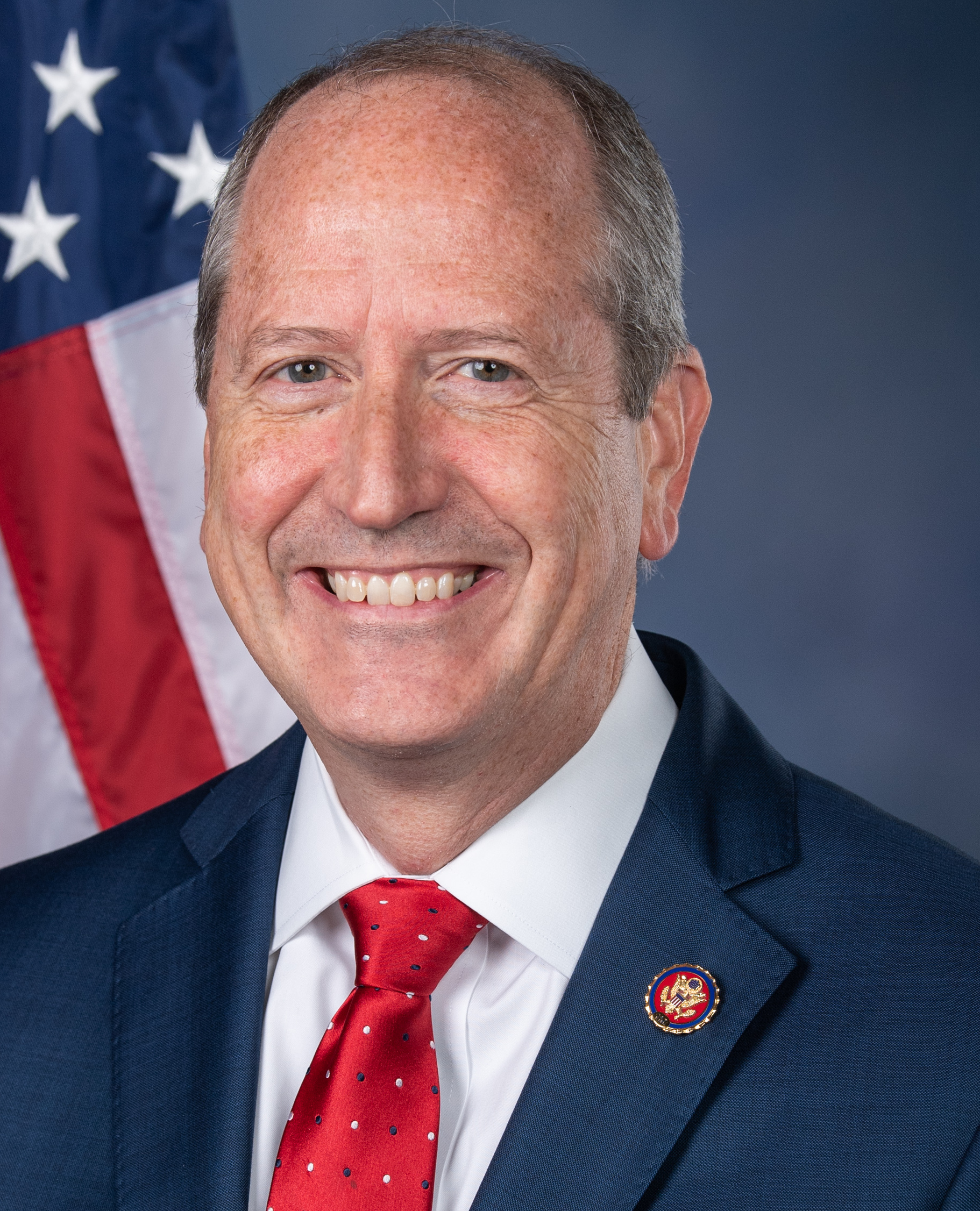

Nominee	Dan Bishop	Cynthia Wallace
Party	Republican	Democratic
Popular vote	224,661	179,463
Percentage	55.6%	44.4%
- Precinct results Bishop: 50–60% 60–70% 70–80% 80–90% Wallace: 50–60% 60–70% 70–80% 80–90% >90%
U.S. Representative before election
Dan Bishop
Republican
Elected U.S. Representative
Dan Bishop
Republican

The 9th district spans from south Charlotte and its southern suburbs of Matthews and Mint Hill into suburban Fayetteville, including Union, Anson, Richmond, Scotland, and Robeson counties. The district remained vacant after the 2018 elections, following the refusal of the state board of elections to certify the results and an ongoing investigation into absentee ballot fraud, and on February 21, 2019, all five members of the board voted to call a new election. Redistricting resulted in the district losing its share of Cumberland and Bladen counties, while gaining southern Moore County and Hoke County. The incumbent was Republican Dan Bishop, who won the special election with 50.7% of the vote.

=== Republican primary ===
==== Candidates ====
===== Nominee =====
- Dan Bishop, incumbent U.S. representative

=== Democratic primary ===
==== Candidates ====
===== Nominee =====
- Cynthia Wallace, financial services vice president and chair of the 9th district for the North Carolina Democratic Party

===== Eliminated in primary =====
- Clayton Brooks, Baptist minister and first chair of the Wake County Democratic Party
- Harry Southerland, Hoke County commissioner
- Marcus Williams, lawyer

===== Declined =====
- Dan McCready, former U.S. Marine, businessman, and nominee for this seat in 2018 & 2019

==== Primary results ====
Democratic primary results
Party	Candidate	Votes	%
Democratic	Cynthia Wallace	45,359	56.0
Democratic	Harry Southerland	13,163	16.3
Democratic	Clayton Brooks	11,913	14.7
Democratic	Marcus Williams	10,527	13.0
Total votes		80,962	100.0

=== General election ===
==== Endorsements ====
Cynthia Wallace (D)

Labor unions

- AFL-CIO

Organizations

- EMILY's List

==== Predictions ====
Source	Ranking	As of
The Cook Political Report	Lean R	October 21, 2020
Inside Elections	Safe R	June 2, 2020
Sabato's Crystal Ball	Likely R	November 2, 2020
Politico	Likely R	April 19, 2020
Daily Kos	Likely R	October 30, 2020
RCP	Likely R	June 9, 2020
Niskanen	Lean R	June 7, 2020
538	Lean R	November 3, 2020

==== Polling ====
Poll source	Date(s) administered	Sample size	Margin of error	Dan Bishop (R)	Cynthia Wallace (D)	Undecided
Public Policy Polling (D) (Note: Poll sponsored by 314 Action, which endorsed Wallace prior to the sampling period.)	October 27–29, 2020	750 (V)	–	45%	43%	12%
Wick Surveys (D) (Note: Poll sponsored by Left of Center PAC.)	September 30 – October 2, 2020	400 (LV)	± 4.9%	30%	34%	37%

==== Results ====
North Carolina's 9th congressional district, 2020
Party	Candidate	Votes	%
Republican	Dan Bishop (incumbent)	224,661	55.6
Democratic	Cynthia Wallace	179,463	44.4
Total votes		404,124	100.0
Republican hold			

== District 10 ==
2020 North Carolina's 10th congressional district election
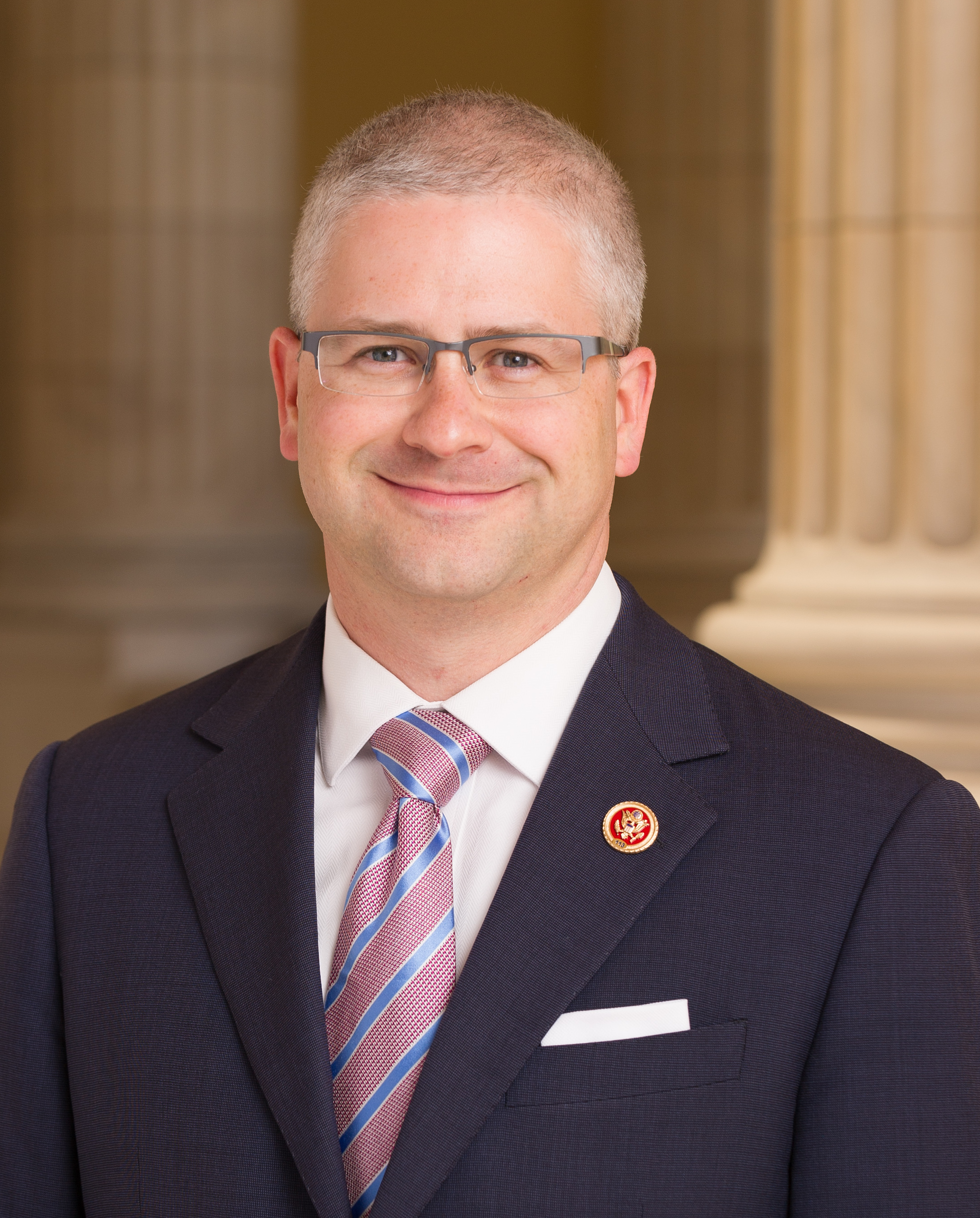

Nominee	Patrick McHenry	David Parker
Party	Republican	Democratic
Popular vote	284,095	128,189
Percentage	68.9%	31.1%
- Precinct results McHenry: 50–60% 60–70% 70–80% 80–90% Parker: 50–60% 60–70% 70–80% 80–90% >90%
U.S. Representative before election
Patrick McHenry
Republican
Elected U.S. Representative
Patrick McHenry
Republican

The 10th district encompasses western North Carolina stretching from the Charlotte suburbs to the South Carolina border. It lost its share of Asheville following redistricting and some of its share of the southwestern Piedmont in south central North Carolina. It gained Rockingham County, Stokes County, Surry County, Yadkin County, Iredell County, as well as part of Forsyth County from the old 5th district. The incumbent was Republican Patrick McHenry, who was re-elected with 59.3% of the vote in 2018.

=== Republican primary ===
==== Candidates ====
===== Nominee =====
- Patrick McHenry, incumbent U.S. representative

===== Eliminated in primary =====
- David L. Johnson
- Ralf Walters

===== Declined =====
- Mark Walker, incumbent U.S. representative for North Carolina's 6th congressional district

==== Primary results ====
Republican primary results
Party	Candidate	Votes	%
Republican	Patrick McHenry (incumbent)	62,661	71.7
Republican	David L. Johnson	14,286	16.3
Republican	Ralf Walters	10,484	12.0
Total votes		87,431	100.0

=== Democratic primary ===
==== Candidates ====
===== Nominee =====
- David Parker, attorney and former North Carolina Democratic Party chair

=== General election ===
==== Predictions ====
Source	Ranking	As of
The Cook Political Report	Safe R	July 2, 2020
Inside Elections	Safe R	June 2, 2020
Sabato's Crystal Ball	Safe R	July 2, 2020
Politico	Safe R	April 19, 2020
Daily Kos	Safe R	June 3, 2020
RCP	Safe R	June 9, 2020
Niskanen	Safe R	June 7, 2020
538	Safe R	November 3, 2020

==== Results ====
North Carolina's 10th congressional district, 2020
Party	Candidate	Votes	%
Republican	Patrick McHenry (incumbent)	284,095	68.9
Democratic	David Parker	128,189	31.1
Total votes		412,284	100.0
Republican hold			

== District 11 ==
2020 North Carolina's 11th congressional district election
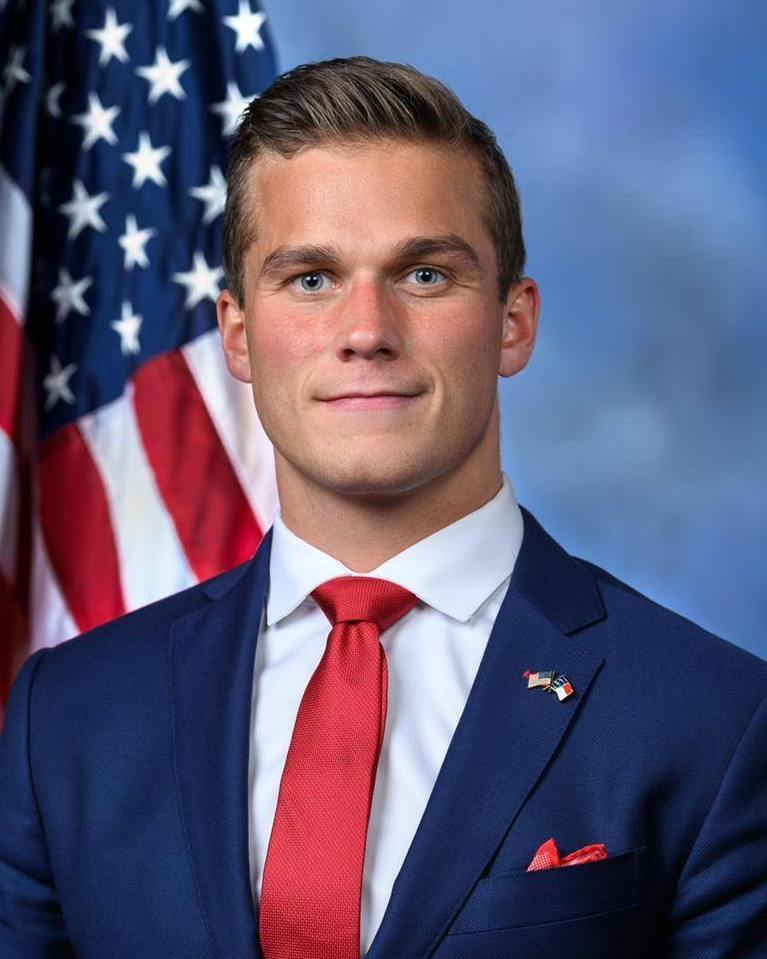

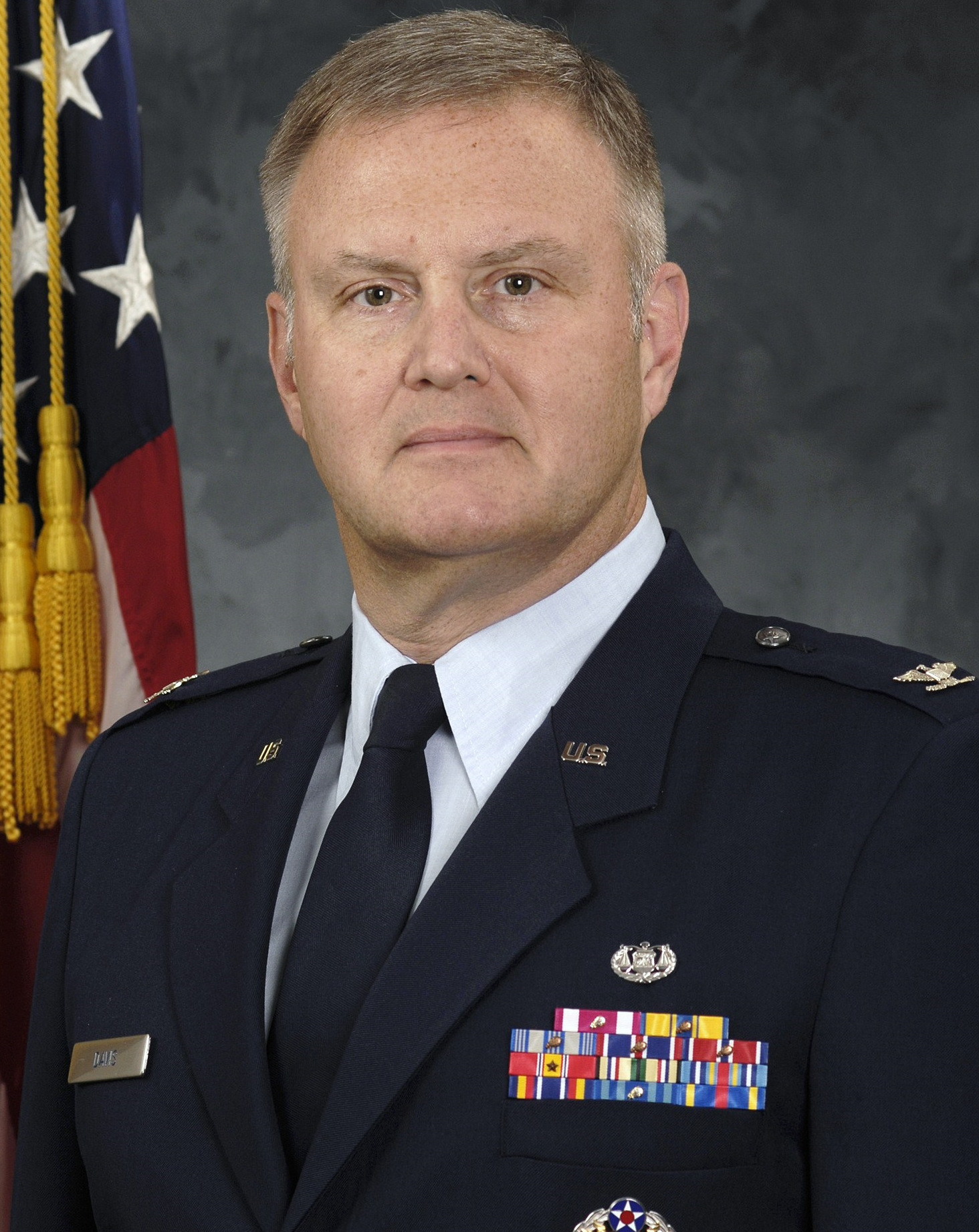
Nominee	Madison Cawthorn	Moe Davis
Party	Republican	Democratic
Popular vote	245,351	190,609
Percentage	54.5%	42.4%
- Precinct results Cawthorn: 40–50% 50–60% 60–70% 70–80% 80–90% >90% Davis: 40–50% 50–60% 60–70% 70–80% 80–90% >90% Tie: 40–50%
U.S. Representative before election
Mark Meadows
Republican
Elected U.S. Representative
Madison Cawthorn
Republican

The 11th district encompasses most of rural western North Carolina, taking in the Appalachian part of the state. Redistricting resulted in the district gaining all Buncombe County, taking in Asheville. The most recent incumbent was Republican Mark Meadows, who was re-elected with 59.2% of the vote in 2018. On December 19, 2019, Meadows announced he would not run for re-election. In March 2020, Meadows was selected to serve as the 29th White House Chief of Staff, and resigned from his seat in Congress.

=== Republican primary ===
==== Candidates ====
===== Nominee =====
- Madison Cawthorn, motivational speaker and businessman

===== Eliminated in runoff =====
- Lynda Bennett, businesswoman

===== Eliminated in primary =====
- Chuck Archerd, candidate for North Carolina's 11th congressional district in 2018
- Matthew Burril, pilot and chair of the Asheville Regional Airport Authority Board
- Jim Davis, state senator
- Dan Driscoll, U.S. Army veteran
- Steve Fekete Jr.
- Dillon Gentry, sales representative and candidate for North Carolina's 5th congressional district in 2018
- Wayne King, deputy chief of staff to U.S. Representative Mark Meadows
- Joey Osborne
- Vance Patterson, businessman and candidate for North Carolina's 11th congressional district in 2012
- Albert Wiley Jr., perennial candidate

===== Declined =====
- Mark Meadows, former U.S. representative

==== Primary results ====
Republican primary results
Party	Candidate	Votes	%
Republican	Lynda Bennett	20,606	22.7
Republican	Madison Cawthorn	18,481	20.4
Republican	Jim Davis	17,465	19.3
Republican	Chuck Archerd	8,272	9.1
Republican	Wayne King	7,876	8.7
Republican	Dan Driscoll	7,803	8.6
Republican	Joey Osborne	6,470	7.1
Republican	Vance Patterson	2,242	2.5
Republican	Matthew Burril	523	0.6
Republican	Albert Wiley Jr.	393	0.4
Republican	Dillon Gentry	390	0.4
Republican	Steve Fekete Jr.	175	0.2
Total votes		90,696	100.0

==== Endorsements ====
Lynda Bennett (R)

Executive officials

- Donald Trump, 45th president of the United States (post-primary)

Federal officials

- Ted Cruz, U.S. senator from Texas
- Jim Jordan, U.S. representative for Ohio's 4th congressional district and ranking member of the House Oversight Committee
- Mark Meadows, former U.S. representative for this district (2013–2020)

Organizations

- Susan B. Anthony List
Madison Cawthorn (R)

Federal officials

- Mark Walker, U.S. representative for North Carolina's 6th congressional district and Vice Chair of the House Republican Conference

State and local officials

- Jim Davis, state senator and candidate for NC-11

==== Runoff results ====
Republican primary runoff results
Party	Candidate	Votes	%
Republican	Madison Cawthorn	30,636	65.8
Republican	Lynda Bennett	15,905	34.2
Total votes		46,541	100.0

=== Democratic primary ===
==== Candidates ====
===== Nominee =====
- Moe Davis, former U.S. Air Force colonel, US Department of Labor Administrative Law Judge, and former chief prosecutor of the Guantanamo military commission

===== Eliminated in primary =====
- Gina Collias, attorney and Republican candidate for North Carolina's 10th congressional district in 2018
- Michael O'Shea, former musical artist and producer
- Phillip Price, businessman and nominee for North Carolina's 11th congressional district in 2018
- Steve Woodsmall, former U.S. Air Force major and Brevard College professor

===== Declined =====
- Heath Shuler, former U.S. representative for North Carolina's 11th congressional district (2007–2013)

==== Primary results ====
Democratic primary results
Party	Candidate	Votes	%
Democratic	Moe Davis	52,983	47.3
Democratic	Gina Collias	25,387	22.7
Democratic	Phillip Price	12,620	11.3
Democratic	Michael O'Shea	12,523	11.2
Democratic	Steve Woodsmall	8,439	7.5
Total votes		111,952	100.0

=== Third parties ===
==== Candidates ====
===== Declared =====
- Tracey DeBruhl (Libertarian)
- Tamara Zwinak (Green)

=== General election ===
==== Predictions ====
Source	Ranking	As of
The Cook Political Report	Lean R	October 8, 2020
Inside Elections	Lean R	October 28, 2020
Sabato's Crystal Ball	Lean R	November 2, 2020
Politico	Lean R	November 2, 2020
Daily Kos	Likely R	August 31, 2020
RCP	Likely R	November 2, 2020
Niskanen	Safe R	June 7, 2020
538	Lean R	November 3, 2020

Post-primary endorsements:

Moe Davis (D)

Labor unions

- AFL-CIO

Organizations

- Equality North Carolina
- Planned Parenthood Action Fund
- Sierra Club
- VoteVets

==== Polling ====
Poll source	Date(s) administered	Sample size	Margin of error	Madison Cawthorn (R)	Moe Davis (D)	Other/ undecided
EMC Research (D) (Note: Poll conducted for the Davis campaign.)	October 15–18, 2020	400 (LV)	± 4.9%	42%	45%	–
EMC Research (D)	September 22–24, 2020	400 (LV)	± 4.9%	42%	46%	–
DCCC Targeting & Analytics Department (D)	August 5–6, 2020	500 (LV)	± 4.4%	46%	41%	13% (Note: "Other candidates" with 6%; undecided with 7%)
EMC Research (D)	July 9–12, 2020	402 (LV)	± 4.89%	42%	40%	–

==== Results ====
North Carolina's 11th congressional district, 2020
Party	Candidate	Votes	%
Republican	Madison Cawthorn	245,351	54.5
Democratic	Moe Davis	190,609	42.4
Libertarian	Tracey DeBruhl	8,682	1.9
Green	Tamara Zwinak	5,503	1.2
Total votes		450,145	100.0
Republican hold			

== District 12 ==
2020 North Carolina's 12th congressional district election
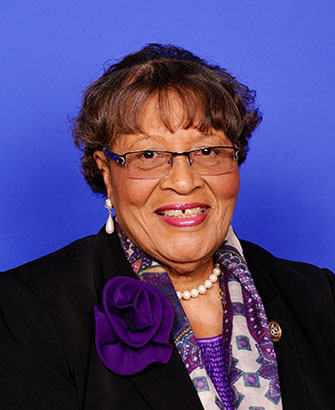
Nominee	Alma Adams
Party	Democratic
Popular vote	341,457
Percentage	100.0%
- Precinct results Adams: >90%
U.S. Representative before election
Alma Adams
Democratic
Elected U.S. Representative
Alma Adams
Democratic

The 12th district is centered around Charlotte and the surrounding immediate suburbs, including Huntersville, Cornelius, Davidson, and Pineville. Redistricting left the 12th district relatively unchanged, but it gained some southern Charlotte suburbs, including Mint Hill and parts of Matthews. The incumbent was Democrat Alma Adams, who was re-elected with 73.1% of the vote in 2018.

=== Democratic primary ===
==== Candidates ====
===== Nominee =====
- Alma Adams, incumbent U.S. representative

===== Eliminated in primary =====
- Keith Cradle, youth program director

==== Primary results ====
Democratic primary results
Party	Candidate	Votes	%
Democratic	Alma Adams (incumbent)	109,009	88.1
Democratic	Keith Cradle	14,713	11.9
Total votes		123,722	100.0

=== Republican primary ===
==== Candidates ====
===== Disqualified =====
- Bill Brewster, businessman

=== General election ===
==== Endorsements ====
Alma Adams (D)

Labor unions

- AFL-CIO

==== Predictions ====
Source	Ranking	As of
The Cook Political Report	Safe D	July 2, 2020
Inside Elections	Safe D	June 2, 2020
Sabato's Crystal Ball	Safe D	July 2, 2020
Politico	Safe D	April 19, 2020
Daily Kos	Safe D	June 3, 2020
RCP	Safe D	June 9, 2020
Niskanen	Safe D	June 7, 2020
538	Safe D	November 3, 2020

==== Results ====
North Carolina's 12th congressional district, 2020
Party	Candidate	Votes	%
Democratic	Alma Adams (incumbent)	341,457	100.0
Total votes		341,457	100.0
Democratic hold			

== District 13 ==
2020 North Carolina's 13th congressional district election
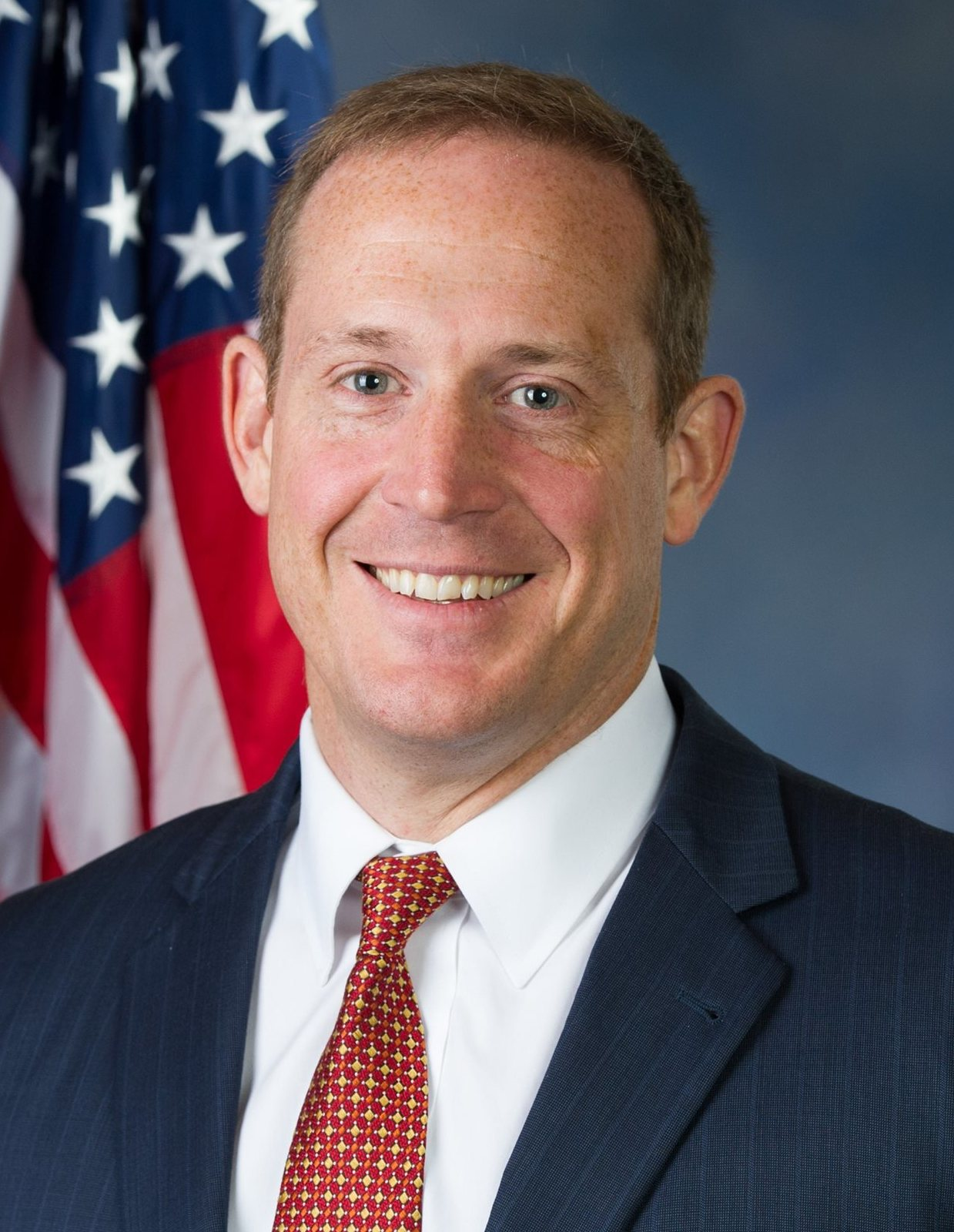

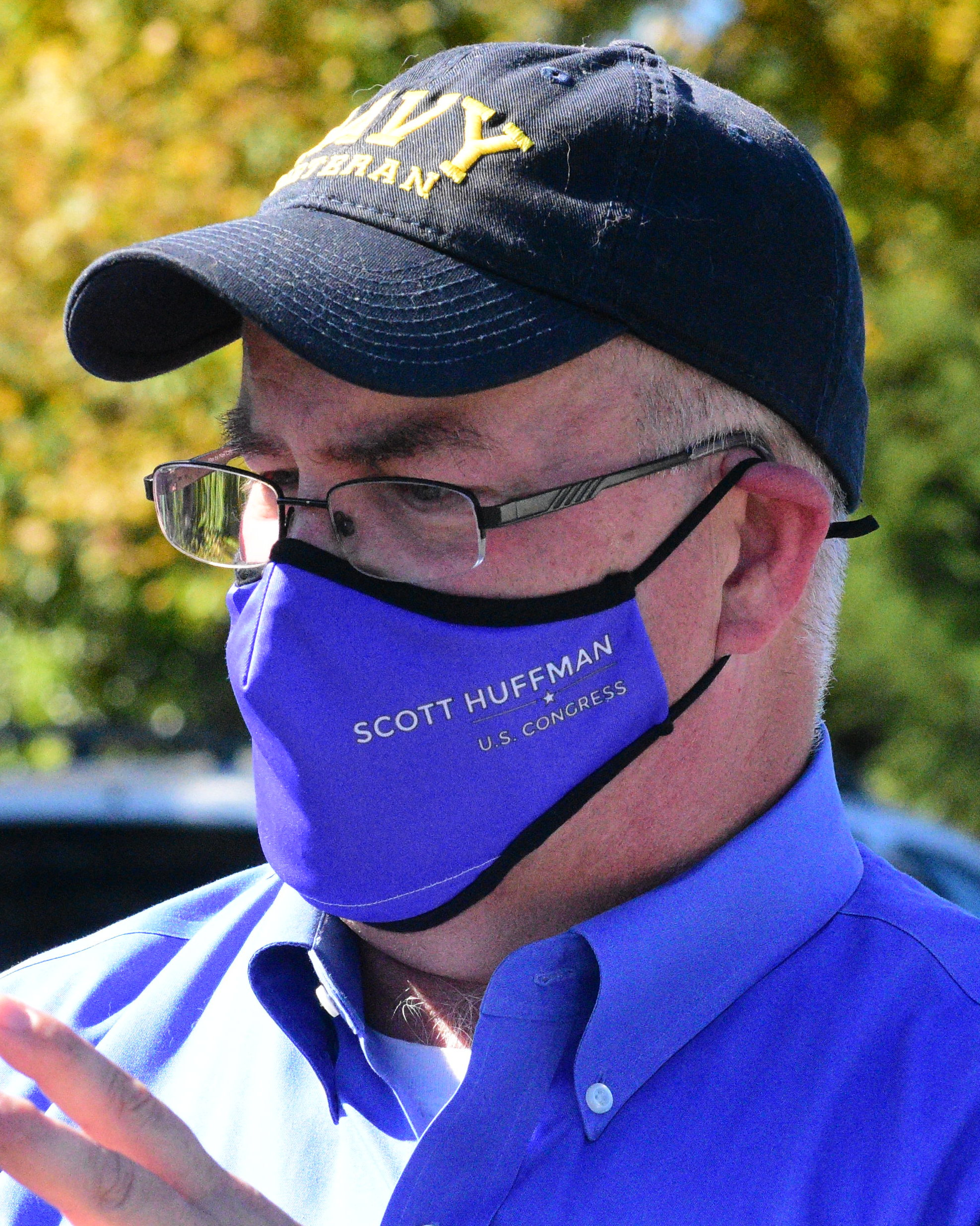
Nominee	Ted Budd	Scott Huffman
Party	Republican	Democratic
Popular vote	267,181	124,684
Percentage	68.2%	31.8%
- Precinct results Budd: 50–60% 60–70% 70–80% 80–90% >90% Huffman: 50–60% 60–70% 70–80% 80–90% >90%
U.S. Representative before election
Ted Budd
Republican
Elected U.S. Representative
Ted Budd
Republican

Following redistricting, the 13th district lost some of its share of the Piedmont Triad region, losing Greensboro to the 6th district & Iredell County to the 10th district. It retained Davidson County and Davie County and expanded its share of Rowan County. The district also gained most of the rural counties previously in the 6th district, including Randolph County, Alamance County, Caswell County, Person County, and a small section of Chatham County. The incumbent was Republican Ted Budd, who was re-elected with 51.5% of the vote in 2018.

=== Republican primary ===
==== Candidates ====
===== Nominee =====
- Ted Budd, incumbent U.S. representative

===== Declined =====
- Mark Walker, incumbent U.S. representative for North Carolina's 6th congressional district

=== Democratic primary ===
==== Candidates ====
===== Nominee =====
- Scott Huffman, businessman and candidate for North Carolina's 8th congressional district in 2018

=== Endorsements ===
Ted Budd (R)

Organizations

- Club for Growth
Scott Huffman (D)

Organizations

- Equality North Carolina

=== General election ===
==== Predictions ====
Source	Ranking	As of
The Cook Political Report	Safe R	July 2, 2020
Inside Elections	Safe R	June 2, 2020
Sabato's Crystal Ball	Safe R	July 2, 2020
Politico	Safe R	April 19, 2020
Daily Kos	Safe R	June 3, 2020
RCP	Safe R	June 9, 2020
Niskanen	Safe R	June 7, 2020
538	Safe R	November 3, 2020

==== Results ====
North Carolina's 13th congressional district, 2020
Party	Candidate	Votes	%
Republican	Ted Budd (incumbent)	267,181	68.2
Democratic	Scott Huffman	124,684	31.8
Total votes		391,865	100.0
Republican hold			

== See also ==
- 2020 North Carolina elections

== Notes ==
Partisan clients
