= North Carolina's 72nd House district =

American legislative district

North Carolina's 72nd State House of Representatives district
Representative
| Amber Baker; D–Winston-Salem |
- Demographics: 40% White; 37% Black; 16% Hispanic; 3% Asian; 1% Other; 4% Multiracial
- Population (2024): 83,647

North Carolina's 72nd House district is one of the 120 districts in the North Carolina House of Representatives. It has been represented by Democrat Amber Baker since 2021.

== Geography ==
Since 2003, the district has been part of the Forsyth County. The district overlaps with the 32nd Senate district.

== District officeholders ==
| Representative | Party | Dates | Notes | Counties |
|---|---|---|---|---|
District created January 1, 1985.
| Allen Barbee (Spring Hope) | Democratic | January 1, 1985 – January 1, 1987 | Redistricted from the 8th district. Lost re-nomination. | 1985–1993; Parts of Nash and Edgecombe counties. |
| Roy Cooper (Rocky Mount) | Democratic | January 1, 1987 – February 21, 1991 | Resigned to assume seat in the State Senate. | 1985–1993; Parts of Nash and Edgecombe counties. |
| Vacant | | February 21, 1991 – March 7, 1991 | | 1985–1993; Parts of Nash and Edgecombe counties. |
| Edward McGee (Rocky Mount) | Democratic | March 7, 1991 – January 1, 1993 | Appointed to finish Cooper's term. | 1985–1993; Parts of Nash and Edgecombe counties. |
| Gene Arnold (Rocky Mount) | Republican | January 1, 1993 – January 1, 2003 | Redistricted to the 25th district and retired. | 1993–2003; Parts of Nash and Wilson counties. |
| Earline Parmon (Winston-Salem) | Democratic | January 1, 2003 – January 1, 2013 | Retired to run for State Senate. | 2003–Present; Part of Forsyth County. |
| Ed Hanes (Winston-Salem) | Democratic | January 1, 2013 – August 7, 2018 | Resigned. | 2003–Present; Part of Forsyth County. |
| Vacant | | August 7, 2018 – August 15, 2018 | | 2003–Present; Part of Forsyth County. |
| Derwin Montgomery (Winston-Salem) | Democratic | August 15, 2018 – January 1, 2021 | Appointed to finish Hanes' term. Retired to run for Congress. | 2003–Present; Part of Forsyth County. |
| Amber Baker (Winston-Salem) | Democratic | January 1, 2021 – Present | | 2003–Present; Part of Forsyth County. |

== Election results ==
=== 2024 ===
North Carolina House of Representatives 72nd district Democratic primary election, 2024
| Party | Candidate | Votes | % |
|---|---|---|---|
| Democratic | Amber Baker (incumbent) | 6,052 | 76.18% |
| Democratic | Marcus Pearson | 1,892 | 23.82% |
| Total votes | | 7,944 | 100% |

North Carolina House of Representatives 72nd district general election, 2024
| Party | Candidate | Votes | % |
|---|---|---|---|
| Democratic | Amber Baker (incumbent) | 31,479 | 100% |
| Total votes | | 31,479 | 100% |
| Democratic hold | | | |

=== 2022 ===
North Carolina House of Representatives 72nd district general election, 2022
| Party | Candidate | Votes | % |
|---|---|---|---|
| Democratic | Amber Baker (incumbent) | 18,738 | 73.87% |
| Republican | Shelton Stallworthy | 6,628 | 26.13% |
| Total votes | | 25,366 | 100% |
| Democratic hold | | | |

=== 2020 ===
North Carolina House of Representatives 72nd district Democratic primary election, 2020
| Party | Candidate | Votes | % |
|---|---|---|---|
| Democratic | Amber Baker | 7,678 | 58.61% |
| Democratic | Lashun Huntley | 5,422 | 41.39% |
| Total votes | | 13,100 | 100% |

North Carolina House of Representatives 72nd district general election, 2020
| Party | Candidate | Votes | % |
|---|---|---|---|
| Democratic | Amber Baker | 29,524 | 71.33% |
| Republican | Dan Lawlor | 11,868 | 28.67% |
| Total votes | | 41,392 | 100% |
| Democratic hold | | | |

=== 2018 ===
North Carolina House of Representatives 72nd district general election, 2018
| Party | Candidate | Votes | % |
|---|---|---|---|
| Democratic | Derwin Montgomery (incumbent) | 19,292 | 79.11% |
| Republican | Reginald Reid | 5,093 | 20.89% |
| Total votes | | 24,385 | 100% |
| Democratic hold | | | |

=== 2016 ===
North Carolina House of Representatives 72nd district general election, 2016
| Party | Candidate | Votes | % |
|---|---|---|---|
| Democratic | Ed Hanes (incumbent) | 28,192 | 100% |
| Total votes | | 28,192 | 100% |
| Democratic hold | | | |

=== 2014 ===
North Carolina House of Representatives 72nd district general election, 2014
| Party | Candidate | Votes | % |
|---|---|---|---|
| Democratic | Ed Hanes (incumbent) | 17,274 | 100% |
| Total votes | | 17,274 | 100% |
| Democratic hold | | | |

=== 2012 ===
North Carolina House of Representatives 72nd district Democratic primary election, 2012
| Party | Candidate | Votes | % |
|---|---|---|---|
| Democratic | Ed Hanes | 3,847 | 43.63% |
| Democratic | S. Wayne Patterson | 3,159 | 35.83% |
| Democratic | Jimmie Lee Bonham | 1,811 | 20.54% |
| Total votes | | 8,817 | 100% |

North Carolina House of Representatives 72nd district general election, 2012
| Party | Candidate | Votes | % |
|---|---|---|---|
| Democratic | Ed Hanes | 26,561 | 74.36% |
| Republican | Charlie Mellies | 9,158 | 25.64% |
| Total votes | | 35,719 | 100% |
| Democratic hold | | | |

=== 2010 ===
North Carolina House of Representatives 72nd district Democratic primary election, 2010
| Party | Candidate | Votes | % |
|---|---|---|---|
| Democratic | Earline Parmon (incumbent) | 2,205 | 75.64% |
| Democratic | Gardenia M. Henley | 710 | 24.36% |
| Total votes | | 2,915 | 100% |

North Carolina House of Representatives 72nd district general election, 2010
| Party | Candidate | Votes | % |
|---|---|---|---|
| Democratic | Earline Parmon (incumbent) | 9,980 | 69.48% |
| Republican | John Magee | 4,384 | 30.52% |
| Total votes | | 14,364 | 100% |
| Democratic hold | | | |

=== 2008 ===
North Carolina House of Representatives 72nd district general election, 2008
| Party | Candidate | Votes | % |
|---|---|---|---|
| Democratic | Earline Parmon (incumbent) | 22,474 | 100% |
| Total votes | | 22,474 | 100% |
| Democratic hold | | | |

=== 2006 ===
North Carolina House of Representatives 72nd district general election, 2006
| Party | Candidate | Votes | % |
|---|---|---|---|
| Democratic | Earline Parmon (incumbent) | 7,971 | 100% |
| Total votes | | 7,971 | 100% |
| Democratic hold | | | |

=== 2004 ===
North Carolina House of Representatives 72nd district general election, 2004
| Party | Candidate | Votes | % |
|---|---|---|---|
| Democratic | Earline Parmon (incumbent) | 17,286 | 100% |
| Total votes | | 17,286 | 100% |
| Democratic hold | | | |

=== 2002 ===
North Carolina House of Representatives 72nd district Democratic primary election, 2002
| Party | Candidate | Votes | % |
|---|---|---|---|
| Democratic | Earline Parmon | 2,333 | 39.74% |
| Democratic | George Bryan | 1,639 | 27.92% |
| Democratic | Annette Beatty | 1,220 | 20.78% |
| Democratic | Mischi Binkley | 679 | 11.57% |
| Total votes | | 5,871 | 100% |

North Carolina House of Representatives 72nd district general election, 2002
| Party | Candidate | Votes | % |
|---|---|---|---|
| Democratic | Earline Parmon | 8,183 | 54.78% |
| Republican | Vernon Robinson | 6,754 | 45.22% |
| Total votes | | 14,937 | 100% |
| Democratic hold | | | |

=== 2000 ===
North Carolina House of Representatives 72nd district general election, 2000
| Party | Candidate | Votes | % |
|---|---|---|---|
| Republican | Gene Arnold (incumbent) | 14,332 | 57.19% |
| Democratic | Mary Alice Wells | 10,728 | 42.81% |
| Total votes | | 25,060 | 100% |
| Republican hold | | | |
