= Amber Baker =

American politician

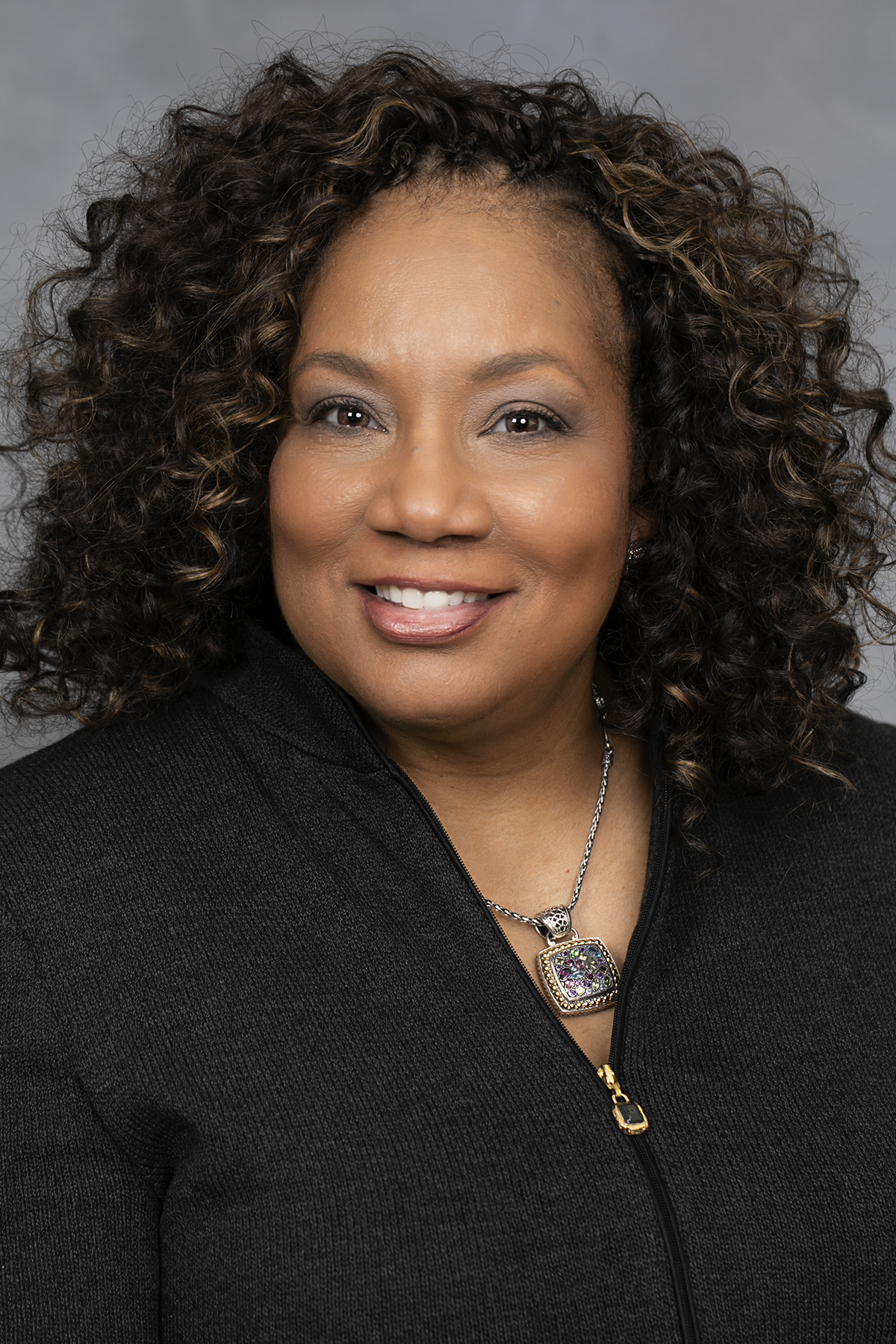

Member of the North Carolina House of Representatives from the 72nd district
- Incumbent
- Assumed office 2021
- Preceded by: Derwin Montgomery

Personal details
- Party: Democratic
- Education: Winston-Salem State University (BS); Ohio State University (MA, PhD)

Amber M. Baker is an American politician. Baker is a Democrat and was elected as the representative for District 72 in the North Carolina House of Representatives, representing Forsyth County, in 2020.

== Early life and career ==
Baker was born in Louisville, Kentucky. She attended Howard University. She earned a Bachelor of Science in elementary education from Winston-Salem State University and a Master of Arts and a Doctor of Philosophy from Ohio State University.

Baker served as principal of Kimberley Park Elementary School in Winston-Salem, North Carolina, part of Winston-Salem/Forsyth County Schools. She has also worked as principal consultant with Beyond Expectations Consultants.

== Political career ==
=== Entry into politics ===
Baker served as vice-chair of the Forsyth County Democratic Party's African-American Caucus. She entered the race for the 72nd district seat in the 2020 state House election after incumbent Derwin Montgomery announced that he would run for Congress rather than seek re-election. Her campaign priorities included increased funding for public education and affordable housing. She defeated Republican Dan Lawlor in the November 2020 general election and took office in January 2021.

=== Legislative and policy work ===
In December 2022, John Railey wrote in The Chronicle that Baker advocated greater cooperation between Winston-Salem and Forsyth County on affordable housing and was working with others to establish a community development corporation focused on affordable housing.

During the April 2023 House budget debate, Baker proposed an amendment to remove a provision creating a commission to recommend academic standards to the North Carolina State Board of Education. She argued that the commission would duplicate the board's responsibilities, while Republican representative Jeffrey Elmore said it would make the development of standards more transparent to parents. The amendment did not pass.

=== Committee assignments ===
For the 2025–2026 legislative session, Baker's standing and select committee assignments included Election Law, Federal Relations and American Indian Affairs, Finance, Oversight, Regulatory Reform, and the House Select Committee on Oversight and Reform.

== Electoral history ==
=== 2020 ===
North Carolina House of Representatives 72nd district Democratic primary election, 2020
Party	Candidate	Votes	%
Democratic	Amber Baker	7,678	58.61%
Democratic	Lashun Huntley	5,422	41.39%
Total votes		13,100	100%

North Carolina House of Representatives 72nd district general election, 2020
Party	Candidate	Votes	%
Democratic	Amber Baker	29,524	71.33%
Republican	Dan Lawlor	11,868	28.67%
Total votes		41,392	100%
Democratic hold			

North Carolina House of Representatives
Preceded by Derwin Montgomery	Member of the North Carolina House of Representatives from the 72nd district 2021-Present	Incumbent
