= Ed Hanes =

American politician

Member of the North Carolina House of Representatives from the 72nd district
- In office January 1, 2013 – August 7, 2018
- Preceded by: Earline Parmon
- Succeeded by: Derwin Montgomery

Personal details
- Party: Democratic
- Education: University of North Carolina at Chapel Hill (BA); University of North Carolina School of Law (JD); Harvard University (MEd)

Edward Hanes Jr. is an American politician. He is a former member of the North Carolina General Assembly, who represented the 72nd district in the North Carolina House of Representatives.

Hanes was first elected to the North Carolina House in 2012. He resigned in August 2018. Hanes ran in the 2020 election for the United States House of Representatives for North Carolina's 6th congressional district. where he lost to the general election winner, Congresswoman Kathy Manning.

== Electoral history ==
=== 2020 ===
North Carolina's 6th congressional district Democratic primary election, 2020
| Party | Candidate | Votes | % |
|---|---|---|---|
| Democratic | Kathy Manning | 56,986 | 48.30% |
| Democratic | Rhonda Foxx | 23,506 | 19.92% |
| Democratic | Bruce Davis | 17,731 | 15.03% |
| Democratic | Derwin Montgomery | 14,705 | 12.46% |
| Democratic | Ed Hanes | 5,067 | 4.29% |
| Total votes | | 117,995 | 100% |

=== 2016 ===
North Carolina House of Representatives 72nd district general election, 2016
| Party | Candidate | Votes | % |
|---|---|---|---|
| Democratic | Ed Hanes (incumbent) | 28,192 | 100% |
| Total votes | | 28,192 | 100% |
| Democratic hold | | | |

=== 2014 ===
North Carolina House of Representatives 72nd district general election, 2014
| Party | Candidate | Votes | % |
|---|---|---|---|
| Democratic | Ed Hanes (incumbent) | 17,274 | 100% |
| Total votes | | 17,274 | 100% |
| Democratic hold | | | |

=== 2012 ===
North Carolina House of Representatives 72nd district Democratic primary election, 2012
| Party | Candidate | Votes | % |
|---|---|---|---|
| Democratic | Ed Hanes | 3,847 | 43.63% |
| Democratic | S. Wayne Patterson | 3,159 | 35.83% |
| Democratic | Jimmie Lee Bonham | 1,811 | 20.54% |
| Total votes | | 8,817 | 100% |

North Carolina House of Representatives 72nd district general election, 2012
| Party | Candidate | Votes | % |
|---|---|---|---|
| Democratic | Ed Hanes | 26,561 | 74.36% |
| Republican | Charlie Mellies | 9,158 | 25.64% |
| Total votes | | 35,719 | 100% |
| Democratic hold | | | |

North Carolina House of Representatives
| Preceded by Earline Parmon | Member of the North Carolina House of Representatives from the 72nd district 2013–2018 | Succeeded by Derwin Montgomery |
