= Replacements, Ltd. =

American retailer

- Type: Limited company
- Founded: Greensboro, North Carolina, 1981
- Founder: Bob Page
- Key people: Scott Fleming
- Revenue: $80 million
- Owner: Bob Page
- Number of employees: 400
- Website: www.replacements.com

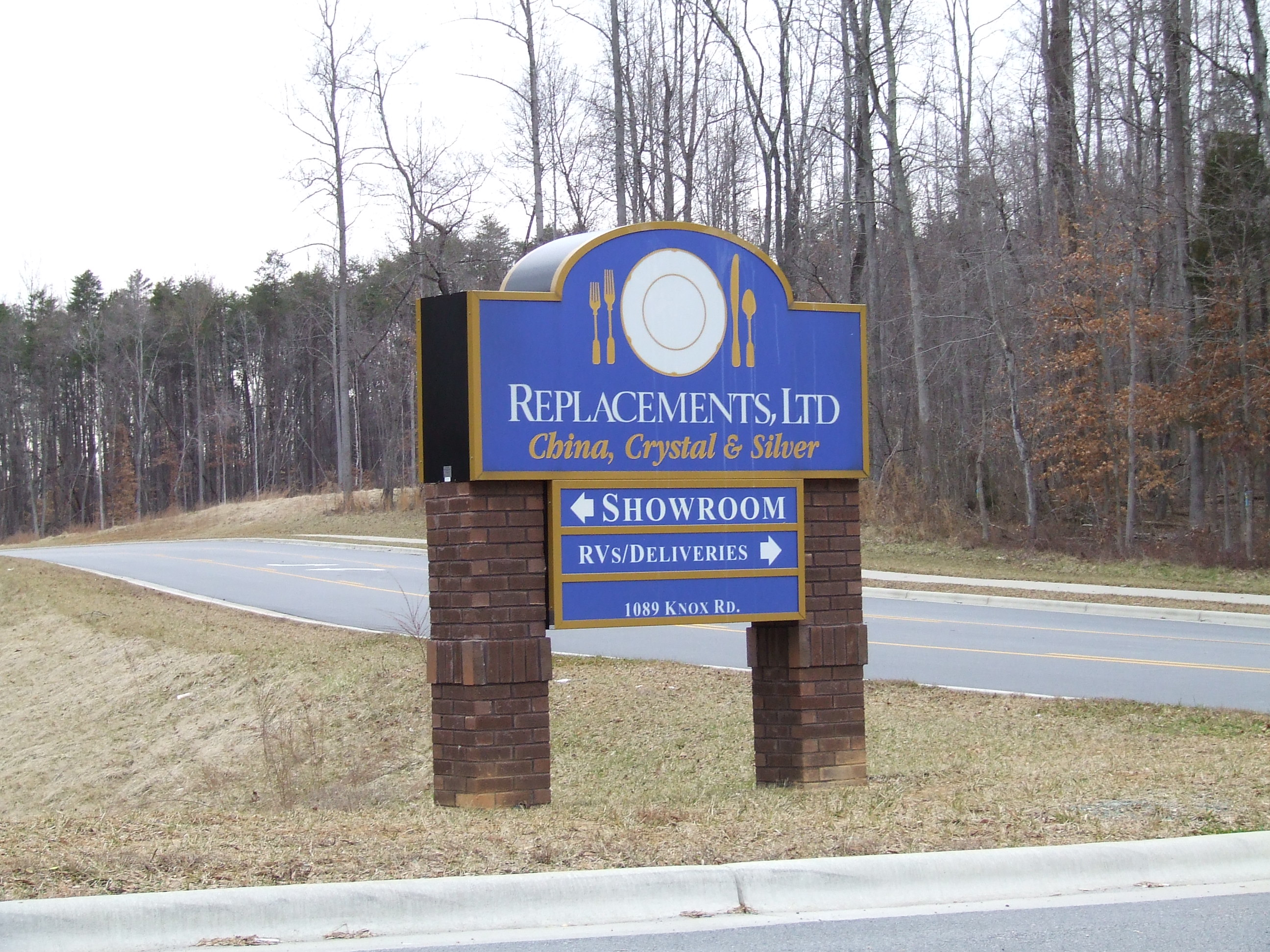
Entrance to Replacements, Ltd. showroom in Greensboro, NC

Replacements, Ltd., based in Greensboro, North Carolina, is the world's largest retailer of china, crystal and silverware, including both patterns still available from manufactures and discontinued patterns. The company, which began in 1981, had an inventory in 2011 of 14 million items from more than 340,000 patterns, with annual sales of $80 million to 10 million customers.

== History ==
In 1981, Bob Page left his job as an auditor for the state of North Carolina to start a mail-order business selling antique china and glassware. Located first in his attic and then in 400 square feet on North Elm Street in Greensboro, North Carolina, Page's business included merchandise from flea markets and customer requests on index cards. In four years, the company went from $159,000 a year to nearly $4 million in sales. The company moved several times, each time to larger space, at Bessemer Avenue, Holbrook Street, and Gallimore Dairy Road.

In 1989, sales were over $9 million, and the company added flatware, also buying its current location on Knox Road in McLeansville. In October 1990, Replacements moved its 1-million-item inventory to the new headquarters/warehouse.

One of the company's services was researching patterns based on photos and rubbings. Buyers also searched for items in patterns that were hard to find, with sources including gift shops and jewelry stores that were closing. The company restored flatware, but china restoration was done only for items to be sold. Inventory ranged from "glasses given out for filling up at the gas station" to Flora Danica.

By 1993, Replacements had made small additions to its new site, which totalled 104,000 square feet, and the company planned a 120,000-square-foot expansion.

In 1999, The Pfaltzgraff Co. made an agreement with Replacements for the company to sell its patterns which were no longer available. This included a list of customers who might want to replace items with the old patterns. Replacements made a similar deal with JCPenney.

In December 2005, Replacements announced plans to expand from 230,000 to 500,000 square feet on 21 acres at a cost of $8 million, including a relocation of Knox Road. Once the project was completed, the company would no longer need to rent a nearby warehouse.

In January 2006, the city of Greensboro annexed the land where the company was located, though its mailing address remained McLeansville. By this time, half of the company's orders came through its web site. Sales were $75 million, nearly two thirds of that china, one sixth flatware, and one eighth crystal.

On August 12, 2008, the company announced plans to increase the size of its headquarters by about 500,000 square feet at a cost of $15 million, putting around 550 employees and 12 million items in one location, down from four.

== National attention ==
In 1986, Inc. named Replacements one of the 500 fastest-growing businesses in the United States.

As far back as 1992, customers included Barbra Streisand, Ted Kennedy, Patrick Swayze and The Vatican.

In 1997, Victory! named Page its Entrepreneur of the Year for his commitment to homosexual employees, including partner benefits.

In August 2000, Oprah Winfrey presented a guest with a bowl in a pattern the guest thought she would never be able to find, a pattern it had found by working with Replacements.

In November 2000, Animal Planet's Pet Story taped an episode about the company's policy of letting people bring their dogs to work. Between 30 and 50 employees did so at the time. Around the same time, CNN's Business Unusual also planned to broadcast a story on Replacements. That same month, a Guiding Light Thanksgiving episode using china supplied by Replacements.

In November 2001, Replacements sold eight Pfaltzgraff plates to be used on Everybody Loves Raymond. When the show began, china patterns were selected for the home of the fictional Barone family. But some of the plates were broken in the course of the series run, and Pfaltzgraff no longer made the plates. In addition, the show needed a pattern not available since 1955 that even Replacements did not have but promised to search for. Later, Replacements found Tchotchkes of Little Red Riding Hood and Little Bo Peep for the family to give as a birthday present to Marie.

In 2001, the company began running ads on U.S. Postal Service trucks outside the Greensboro area.

For its Carnival Legend ship debuting August 24, 2002, Carnival Cruise Lines purchased 500 pieces of china for its main dining room.

In its 2003 edition, the Rand McNally road atlas named Replacements to its list of top 25 free attractions. The company has conducted tours of its warehouse starting in July 1992.

In the 2005 film Junebug, one of the characters works in the factory and there is a scene that shows characters operating the different sections of the assembly line.
