= Derwin Montgomery =

American politician

Member of the North Carolina House of Representatives from the 72nd district
- In office August 15, 2018 – January 1, 2021
- Preceded by: Ed Hanes
- Succeeded by: Amber Baker

Personal details
- Born: Derwin Lamar Montgomery; September 3, 1988 (age 37)
- Party: Democratic

Derwin Lamar Montgomery (born September 3, 1988) is a former Democratic member of the North Carolina House of Representatives, who represented the 72nd district (containing parts of Forsyth County) from 2018 until 2021.

== Political career ==
Montgomery served on the Winston-Salem City Council from 2009 through 2018.

Montgomery was appointed to complete the unexpired term of Rep. Ed Hanes for the 72nd district in the North Carolina House of Representatives in August 2018. He went on to win the election for a full two-year term on 6 November 2018 as the nominee of the Democratic Party. He secured seventy-nine percent of the vote while his closest rival, Republican Reginald Reid, secured twenty-one percent.

In 2020, Montgomery ran for the U.S. House of Representatives in the 6th congressional district, but lost the Democratic primary to Kathy Manning.

== Electoral history ==
=== 2020 ===
North Carolina's 6th congressional district Democratic primary election, 2020
Party	Candidate	Votes	%
Democratic	Kathy Manning	56,986	48.30%
Democratic	Rhonda Foxx	23,506	19.92%
Democratic	Bruce Davis	17,731	15.03%
Democratic	Derwin Montgomery	14,705	12.46%
Democratic	Ed Hanes	5,067	4.29%
Total votes		117,995	100%

=== 2018 ===
North Carolina House of Representatives 72nd district general election, 2018
Party	Candidate	Votes	%
Democratic	Derwin Montgomery (incumbent)	19,292	79.11%
Republican	Reginald Reid	5,093	20.89%
Total votes		24,385	100%
Democratic hold			

North Carolina House of Representatives
Preceded by Ed Hanes	Member of the North Carolina House of Representatives from the 72nd district 2018-2021	Succeeded by Amber Baker
