= Kathy Manning =

American politician and lawyer (born 1956)

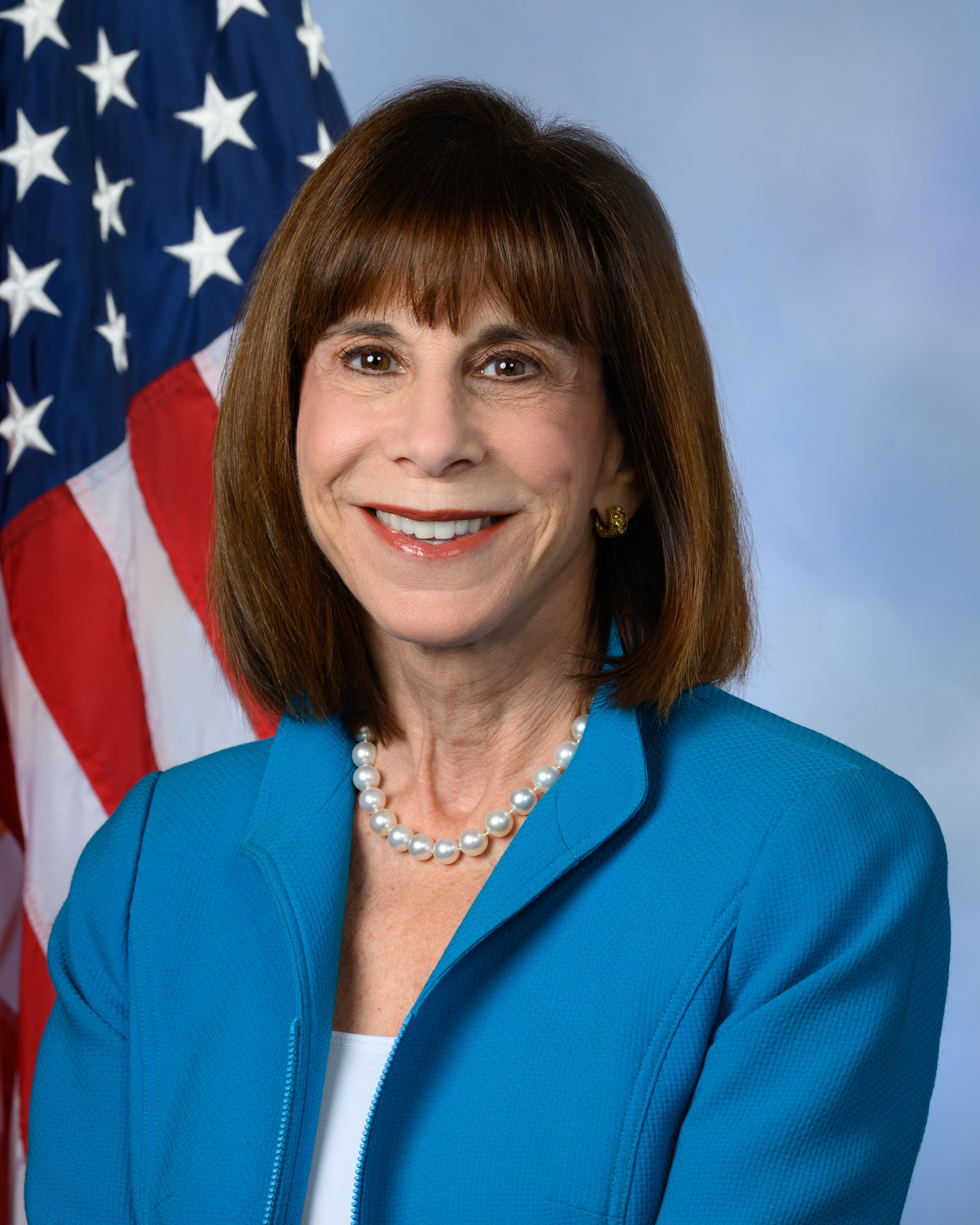
- Official portrait, 2021

Member of the U.S. House of Representatives from North Carolina's 6th district
- In office January 3, 2021 – January 3, 2025
- Preceded by: Mark Walker
- Succeeded by: Addison McDowell

Personal details
- Born: December 3, 1956 (age 69) Detroit, Michigan, U.S.
- Party: Democratic
- Spouse: Randall Kaplan
- Children: 3
- Education: Harvard University (BA); University of Michigan (JD)
- Manning's voice Manning supporting the Speak Out Act. Recorded November 16, 2022

Kathy Ellen Manning (born December 3, 1956) is an American lawyer and politician who represented the North Carolina's 6th congressional district from 2021 to 2025. A member of the Democratic Party, her district was in the heart of the Piedmont Triad area, including Greensboro and High Point, as well as parts of Forsyth, Rockingham, and Caswell Counties.

In December 2023, Manning announced that she would not be running for reelection due to new "egregiously gerrymandered congressional districts" in North Carolina.

In 2025, Manning was named chair of the board of directors of the Democratic Majority for Israel, an advocacy organization focused on electing pro-Israel Democrats.

== Early life and career ==
Manning was born to a Jewish family in Detroit, Michigan, on December 3, 1956. Her father worked for the Ford Motor Company for 40 years. Manning attended Interlochen Center for the Arts's National Music Camp in Northern Michigan, where she studied music and drama. She earned her bachelor’s degree from Harvard University, where she founded Radcliffe Pitches, the first female a cappella group at Harvard. She also attended the University of Michigan Law School, earning a Juris Doctor.

After graduating from law school, Manning practiced law in Washington D.C. for five-and-a-half years before moving to Greensboro, her husband's hometown, in 1987. She continued to practice law in Greensboro for twenty years, becoming a partner at a major North Carolina law firm before starting her own immigration firm in 2002.

She was the first woman to serve as board chair of the Jewish Federations of North America, from 2009 to 2012, and served on the boards of the American Jewish Joint Distribution Committee and the Jewish Agency for Israel. She also was the founding board chair of Prizmah: Center for Jewish Day Schools.

Starting in 2012, she led the ten-year effort to build what would become the Steven Tanger Center for the Performing Arts, a performing arts venue in downtown Greensboro.

== U.S. House of Representatives ==
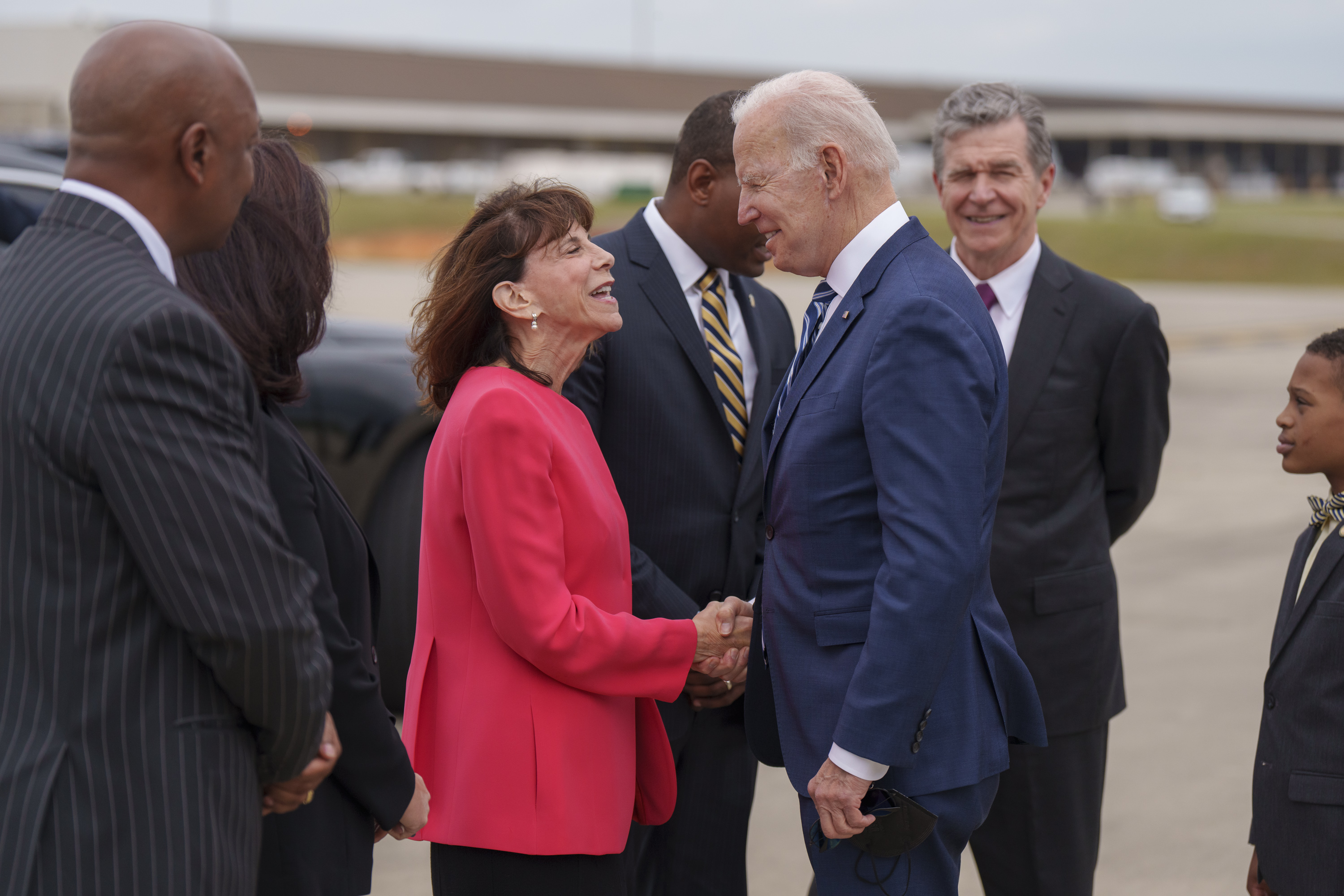
Manning greeting President Joe Biden in April 2022

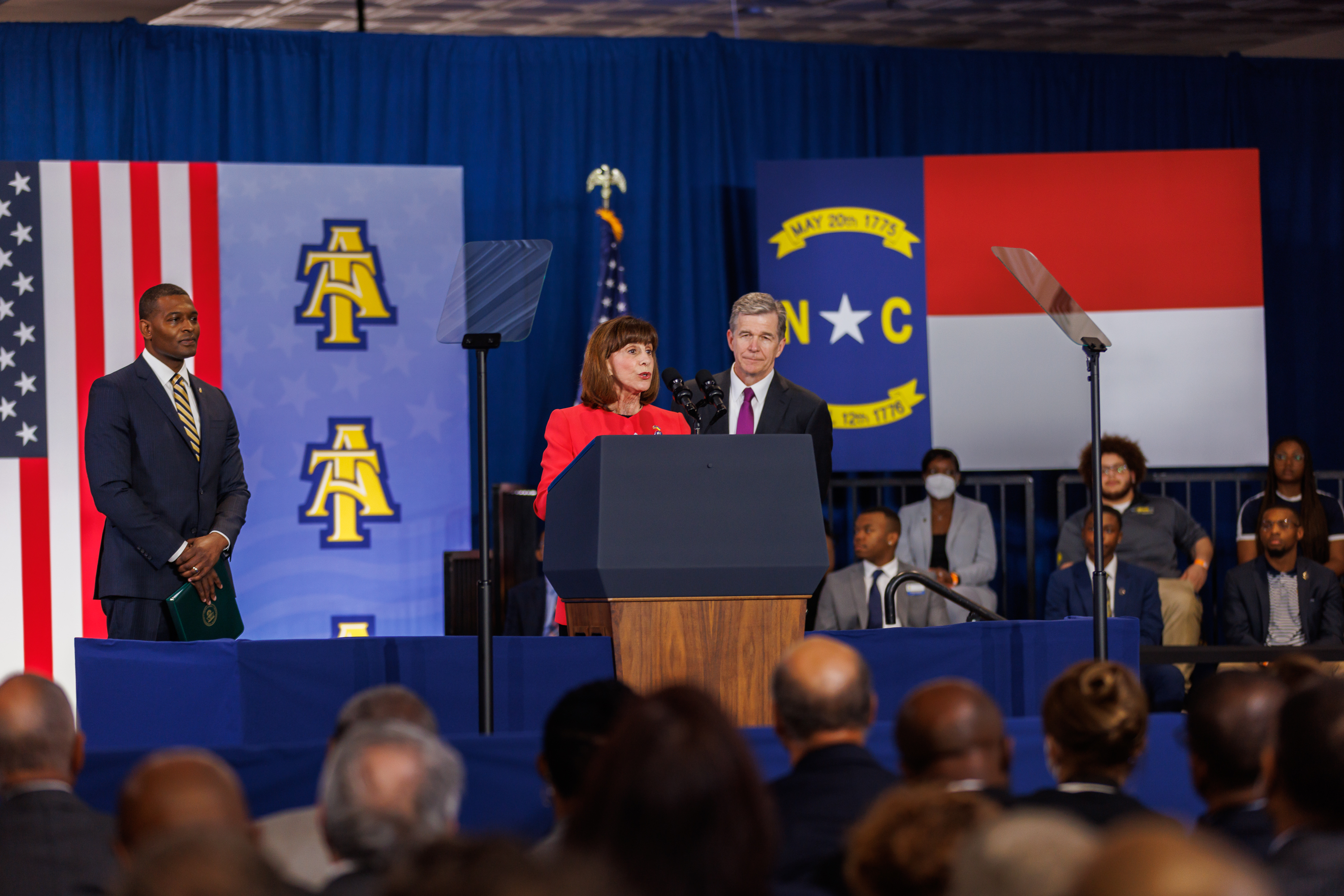
Manning speaking at an event with Governor Roy Cooper and EPA Administrator Michael Regan

=== Elections ===
==== 2018 ====
In 2018, Manning ran against Republican incumbent Ted Budd for the U.S. House of Representatives in North Carolina's 13th congressional district. At the time, the district stretched from southwestern Greensboro to the northern exurbs of Charlotte. On paper, the district tilted Republican; Donald Trump had carried the district two years earlier with 53% of the vote. She lost to Budd, 52% to 46%.

==== 2020 ====
After a court-ordered redistricting in 2019, 6th District was reconfigured to include the Triad, with all of Guilford County, and part of Forsyth County, including most of Winston-Salem. The previous 6th District, which included only parts of Greensboro, had been represented by Republican Mark Walker for three terms.

On December 2, 2019, hours before the new map was issued, Manning announced she would run in the 6th. The new district was significantly more compact and Democratic than its predecessor. Had it existed in 2016, Hillary Clinton would have won it with over 59% of the vote–a near-mirror image of Trump's 56% in the old 6th.

With most observers believing the 6th was a likely Democratic pickup, Walker announced he would not run for a fourth term.

Manning won the Democratic primary, and in the general election, she defeated Republican nominee Lee Haywood with 62% of the vote. Upon her swearing-in on January 3, 2021, she became the first woman to ever represent the 6th District, the first Democrat to represent this district since 1985, and the first Jewish person to represent North Carolina in Congress.

Manning has stated health care is one of her driving issues, motivated by the "labyrinthine process of getting insurance" to cover her daughter's medication for a chronic illness.

==== 2022 ====
On November 8, 2022 Manning won re-election to her house seat against Republican Christian Castelli 54% to 45%,.

After the 2020 census, the North Carolina General Assembly redrew the congressional maps for the 2022 election. Those maps were challenged in several lawsuits that made their way to the North Carolina Supreme Court. In a 4-3 decision split down party lines, the North Carolina Supreme Court struck down the maps, finding that the districts drawn reflected extreme partisan gerrymandering in violation of the North Carolina state constitution, and ordered them to be redrawn. After rejecting the redrawn maps, the Court appointed a bipartisan panel of experts, called special masters, made up of two Republicans and one Democrat, to draw fair maps.

The approved maps removed most of Winston-Salem, while keeping all of Guilford County, Greensboro, and High Point and expanding the 6th District to include Rockingham County and most of Caswell County.

=== Tenure ===
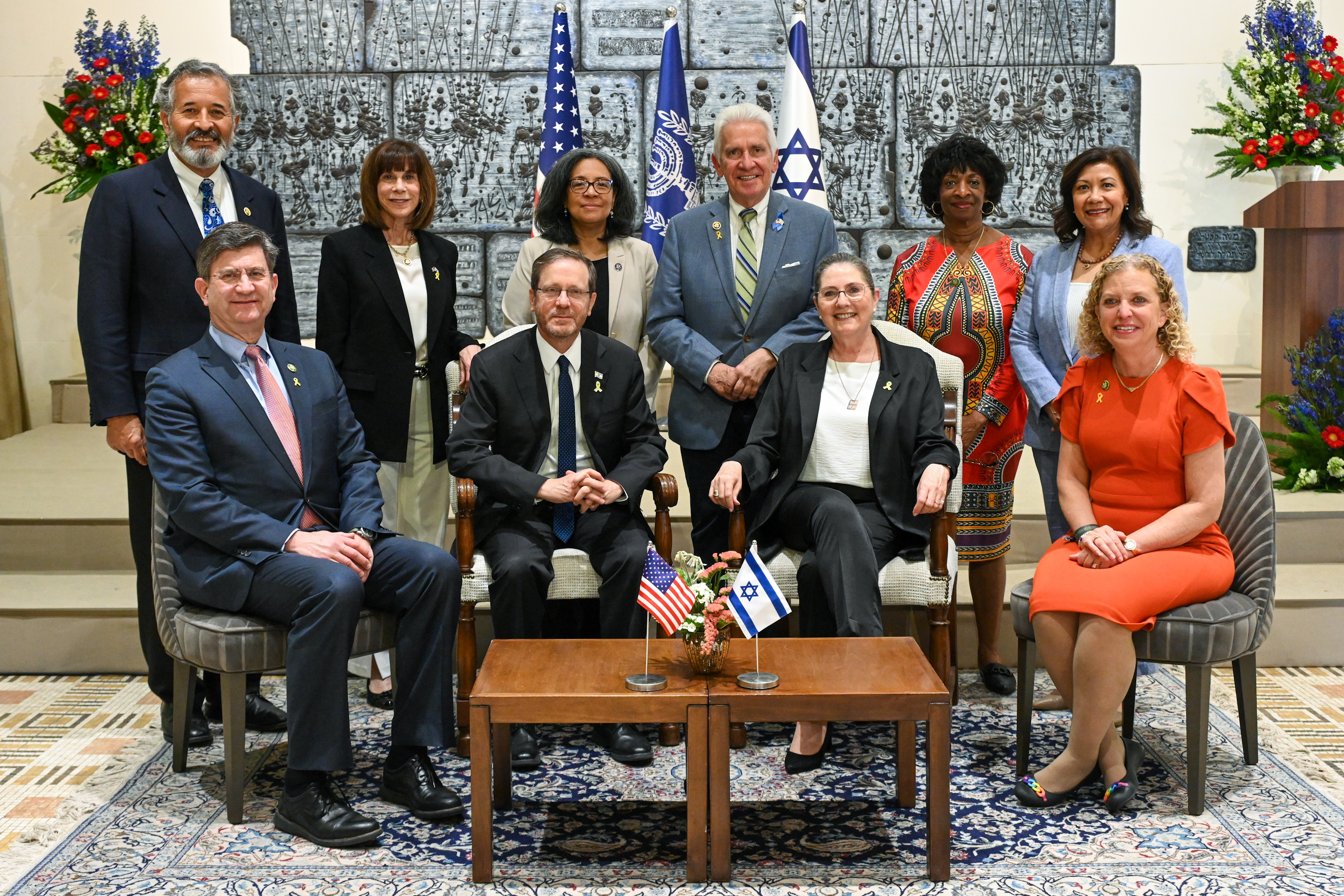
Manning and other members of the US congressional delegation with Israeli president Isaac Herzog in Jerusalem, Israel, March 28, 2024

As of January 2024, Manning had voted with President Joe Biden's stated positions 84.9% of the time in the 118th Congress, according to an ABC News analysis.

In the 117th Congress, Manning voted with President Joe Biden's stated positions 100% of the time, according to a FiveThirtyEight analysis.

Manning was first sworn into Congress on January 3, 2021, during the height of the COVID pandemic. Three days later, Manning was one of the members trapped in the House Chamber gallery during the January 6 attack on the Capitol. She was among the last people to be rescued from the gallery and had to remain with other congressional members in a secure location for close to five hours before returning to the House Chamber to vote to certify the election of President Biden.

=== Legislation ===
Manning is the author of the Right to Contraception Act, legislation she introduced to protect the right of people to use and health care professionals to prescribe the full range of FDA-approved contraception. She first introduced this legislation in the 117th Congress in response to Justice Clarence Thomas’s concurring opinion in Dobbs v. Jackson Women’s Health Organization, the case that overturned the 50-year-old precedent of Roe v. Wade protecting abortion rights. On July 21, 2022, the Right to Contraception Act passed the House of Representatives in the 117th Congress by a vote of 228 – 195. Manning re-introduced the Right to Contraception Act while in the minority in the 118th Congress, and on June 4, 2024, she filed a discharge petition on the bill in an attempt to bring it to the House Floor for a vote.

In the 118th Congress, Manning introduced the Countering Antisemitism Act with Republican Chris Smith from New Jersey, bipartisan legislation to strengthen federal efforts to counter antisemitism. A companion bill was introduced in the Senate by Senators Jacky Rosen from Nevada and James Lankford from Oklahoma. Manning called it the "most comprehensive bill" on antisemitism, and it incorporated guidance outlined in the Biden administration's first ever U.S. National Strategy to Counter Antisemitism.

On September 9, 2024, the Securing Global Telecommunications Act, legislation introduced by Manning and Republican Congresswoman Young Kim from California passed the House of Representatives by voice vote. The pair had previously introduced this legislation in the 117th Congress, where it also passed the House. This bill requires the Department of State develop and submit to Congress a strategy to promote the use of secure telecommunication infrastructure in countries other than the United States.

On November 20, 2024, the House of Representatives agreed to Manning’s resolution condemning the rise of antisemitism around the world, encouraging an increase in international cooperation to counter antisemitism and welcoming the Global Guidelines for Countering Antisemitism.

A member of the House Committee on Education and the Workforce, Manning introduced legislation to expand access to mental health services in schools and to expand healthcare to address the high rate of maternal mortality.

Manning was one of the original co-sponsors of The Dignity Act, a bipartisan bill introduced at the beginning of the 118th Congress to enact comprehensive immigration reform, including measures to secure the border and expedite asylum determinations, create a pathway to citizenship for DACA recipients, and increase visas for legal immigration to enhance the workforce.

=== Committee assignments ===
- Committee on Foreign Affairs (Vice Ranking Member of Full Committee for the 118th Congress)
  - Subcommittee on Global Health, Global Human Rights, and International Organizations
  - Subcommittee on the Middle East, North Africa and Central Asia (Vice Chair for the 117th Congress)
  - Subcommittee on Asia, the Pacific, Central Asia, and Nonproliferation (117th Congress)
- Committee on Education and the Workforce
  - Subcommittee on Health, Employment, Labor, and Pensions
  - Subcommittee on Higher Education and Workforce Development
  - Subcommittee on Early Childhood, Elementary and Secondary Education (117th Congress)

=== Caucus memberships ===
- New Democrat Coalition (Chair, Workforce Development Task Force, 118th Congress)
- Democratic Women's Caucus (Policy Co-Chair, 118th Congress)
- Pro-Choice Caucus
- Congressional Equality Caucus
- Congressional Ukraine Caucus
- Gun Violence Prevention Task Force
- Black Maternal Health Caucus
- Labor Caucus
- Bipartisan Historically Black Colleges and Universities Caucus
- Rare Disease Caucus

In 2022, Manning took over as lead Democrat on the House Bipartisan Task Force for Combating Antisemitism, succeeding Former Congressman Ted Deutch from Florida. As co-chair, Manning held meetings with White House officials, the U.S. Ambassador for Monitoring and Combating Antisemitism, Deborah Lipstadt, officials from European countries engaged in combatting antisemitism as well representatives from major Jewish organizations. Manning was outspoken following the October 7th, 2023 Hamas attack on Israel, and hosted many meetings with families of hostages and members of Congress. In November 2024, it was announced that Congressman Dan Goldman from New York would take over following Manning’s departure from Congress.

== Personal life ==
Manning and her husband, Randall Kaplan, have three children and three grandchildren.

== Electoral history ==
North Carolina's 13th congressional district, 2018 Democratic primary results
Party	Candidate	Votes	%
Democratic	Kathy Manning	19,554	70.1
Democratic	Adam Coker	8,324	29.9
Total votes		27,878	100.0

North Carolina's 13th congressional district, 2018
Party	Candidate	Votes	%
Republican	Ted Budd (incumbent)	147,570	51.5
Democratic	Kathy Manning	130,402	45.6
Libertarian	Tom Bailey	5,513	1.9
Green	Robert Corriher	2,831	1.0
Total votes		286,316	100.0
Republican hold			

North Carolina's 6th congressional district, 2020 Democratic primary results
Party	Candidate	Votes	%
Democratic	Kathy Manning	56,986	48.3
Democratic	Rhonda Foxx	23,506	19.9
Democratic	Bruce Davis	17,731	15.0
Democratic	Derwin Montgomery	14,705	12.5
Democratic	Ed Hanes	5,067	4.3
Total votes		117,995	100.0

North Carolina's 6th congressional district, 2020
Party	Candidate	Votes	%
Democratic	Kathy Manning	253,531	62.3
Republican	Lee Haywood	153,598	37.7
Total votes		407,129	100.0
Democratic gain from Republican			

North Carolina's 6th congressional district, 2022
Party	Candidate	Votes	%
Democratic	Kathy Manning (incumbent)	139,553	53.9
Republican	Christian Castelli	116,635	45.0
Libertarian	Thomas Watercott	2,810	1.1
Total votes		256,950	100.0
Democratic hold			

== See also ==
- List of Jewish members of the United States Congress
- Women in the United States House of Representatives

U.S. House of Representatives
Preceded by Mark Walker	Member of the U.S. House of Representatives from North Carolina's 6th congressional district 2021–2025	Succeeded by Addison McDowell
U.S. order of precedence (ceremonial)
Preceded by Dan Bishop as Former U.S. Representative	Order of precedence of the United States as Former U.S. Representative	Succeeded by Robert Weygand as Former U.S. Representative
