= 2024 United States House of Representatives elections in North Carolina =

- November 5, 2024

All 14 North Carolina seats to the United States House of Representatives
| | Majority party | Minority party |
|---|---|---|
| Party | Republican | Democratic |
| Last election | 7 | 7 |
| Seats won | 10 | 4 |
| Seats after | ▲3 | ▼3 |
| Popular vote | 2,889,657 | 2,328,248 |
| Percentage | 52.78% | 42.80% |
| Swing | ▲0.75% | ▼5.65% |

Republican hold Republican gain
Democratic hold
Republican
40–50%
50–60%
60–70%
70–80%
80–90%
Democratic
40–50%
50–60%
60–70%
70–80%
80–90%

The 2024 United States House of Representatives elections in North Carolina were held on November 5, 2024, to elect the fourteen U.S. representatives from the State of North Carolina, one from all fourteen of the state's congressional districts. The elections coincided with the 2024 U.S. presidential election, as well as other elections to the House of Representatives, elections to the United States Senate, and various state and local elections. The primary elections took place on March 5, 2024.

== Background ==
In 2021, the North Carolina Supreme Court ruled against a congressional map proposed by the state legislature deeming it as a partisan gerrymander and drew its own congressional map that was used for the 2022 election cycle. However, after the 2022 elections, Republicans gained a majority on the State Supreme Court and ruled in April 2023 that claims of partisan gerrymandering are non-justiciable. The General Assembly then passed a new map in October 2023, placing three incumbent Democrats in Republican-leaning districts. Following the implementation of the boundaries passed in late 2023, multiple incumbent Democrats chose not to run for re-election in heavily altered, unwinnable territory. As a direct result, Republicans picked up three seats in the 6th, 13th, and 14th districts, successfully expanding their influence and locking in a commanding 10–4 Republican majority for North Carolina’s U.S. House delegation.

== District 1 ==
2024 North Carolina's 1st congressional district election
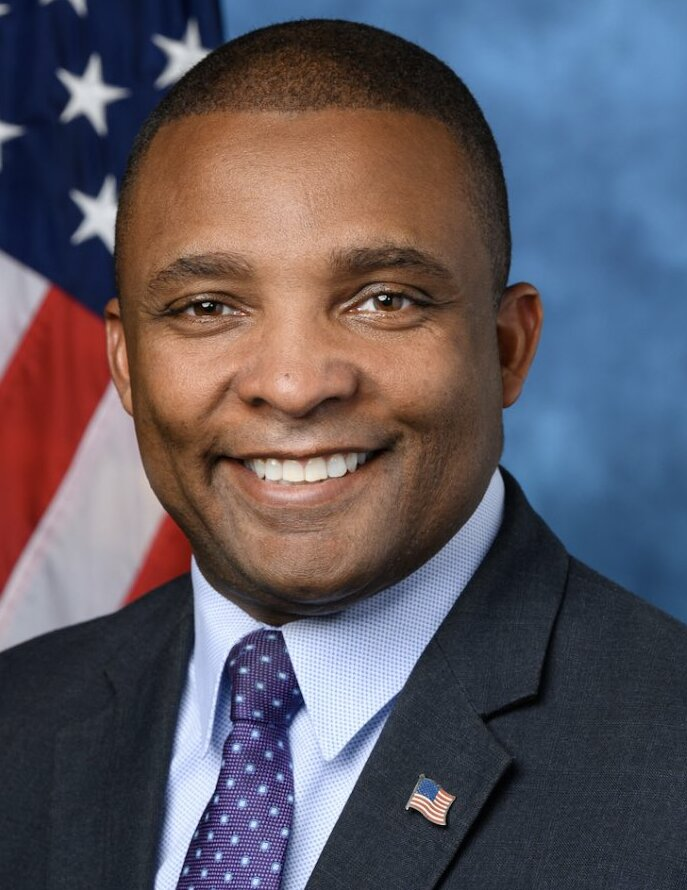

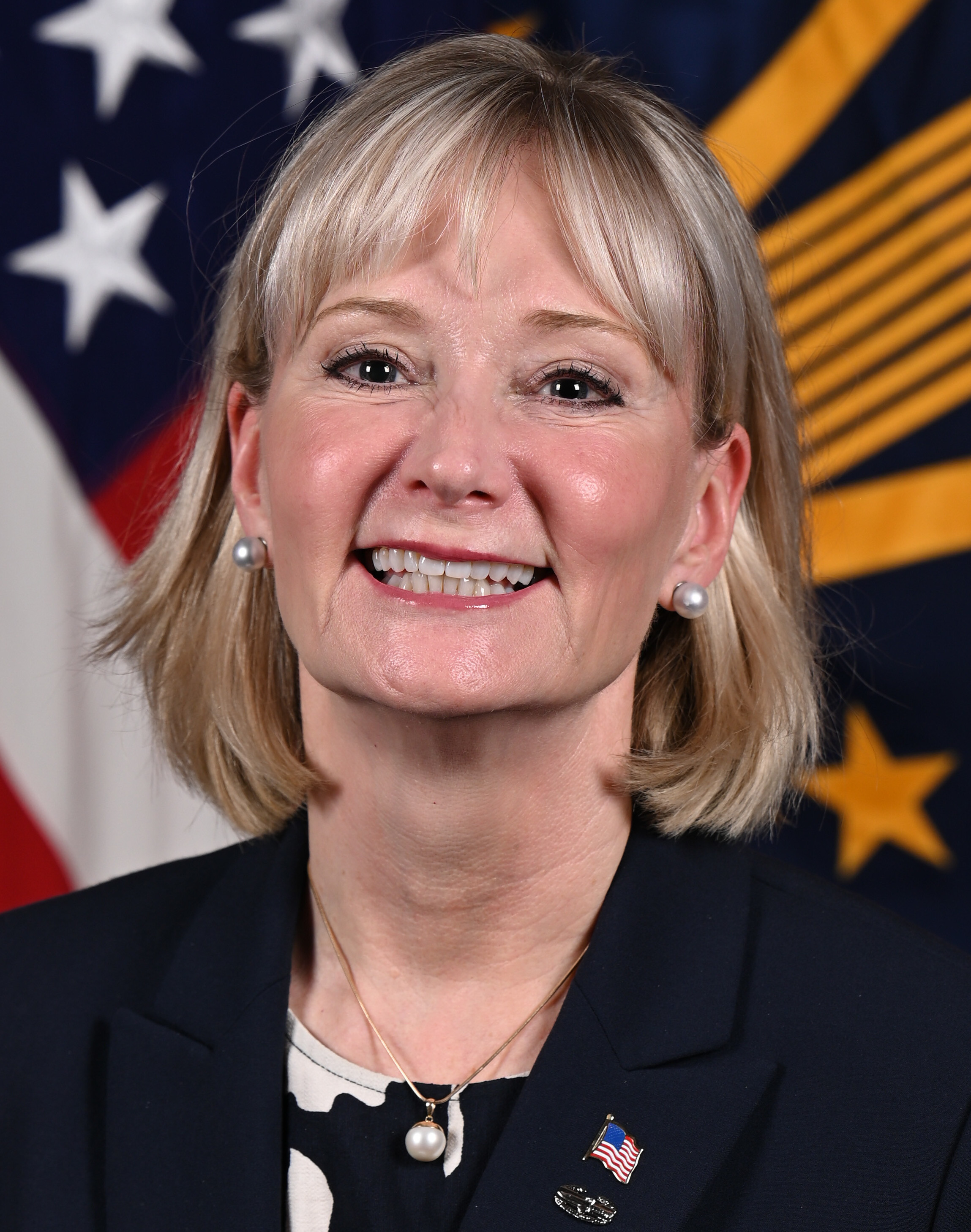
| Nominee | Don Davis | Laurie Buckhout |
| Party | Democratic | Republican |
| Popular vote | 186,341 | 180,034 |
| Percentage | 49.5% | 47.8% |
- Davis: 40–50% 50–60% 60–70% 70–80% 80–90% >90% Buckhout: 40–50% 50–60% 60–70% 70–80% 80–90% >90% Tie
U.S. Representative before election
Don Davis
Democratic
Elected U.S. Representative
Don Davis
Democratic

The new 1st district includes all of Bertie, Camden, Chowan, Currituck, Edgecombe, Gates, Greene, Halifax, Hertford, Lenoir, Martin, Nash, Northampton, Pasquotank, Perquimans, Tyrrell, Vance, Warren, Wayne, Washington, and Wilson counties, as well as a small portion of eastern Granville County. The incumbent was Democrat Don Davis, who was previously elected with 52.4% of the vote in 2022.

=== Democratic primary ===
==== Nominee ====
- Don Davis, incumbent U.S. representative

==== Endorsements ====
Don Davis

U.S representatives

- Seth Moulton, U.S. representative from Massachusetts's 6th congressional district (2015–present)

Organizations

- AIPAC
- Democratic Majority for Israel
- International Franchise Association
- Jewish Democratic Council of America
- Natural Resources Defense Council
- NextGen America PAC (post-primary)
- Sierra Club
- With Honor Fund

Labor unions

- National Education Association

==== Fundraising ====
Campaign finance reports as of February 14, 2024
| Candidate | Raised | Spent | Cash on hand |
|---|---|---|---|
| Don Davis (D) | $1,202,922 | $259,214 | $961,680 |
Source: Federal Election Commission

=== Republican primary ===
==== Nominee ====
- Laurie Buckhout, consulting firm owner and retired colonel

==== Eliminated in primary ====
- Sandy Smith, farmer and nominee for this district in 2020 and 2022

==== Withdrawn ====
- Fred Von Canon, software training business owner (ran in the 13th district)

==== Endorsements ====
Laurie Buckhout

U.S. representatives

- Ryan Zinke, U.S. representative from Montana's 1st congressional district (2023–present) and at-large district (2015–2017); former U.S. secretary of the interior (2017–2019)

Organizations

- Congressional Leadership Fund (post-primary)
- Republican Jewish Coalition
- Susan B. Anthony Pro-Life America

==== Fundraising ====
Campaign finance reports as of February 14, 2024
| Candidate | Raised | Spent | Cash on hand |
|---|---|---|---|
| Laurie Buckhout (R) | $1,326,681 (Note: $1,000,000 of this total was self-funded by Buckhout) | $1,011,957 | $314,724 |
| Sandy Smith (R) | $897,926 (Note: $450,000 of this total was self-funded by Smith) | $855,498 | $55,218 |
Source: Federal Election Commission

==== Results ====
Primary results by county: Buckhout: 50–60%; 60–70%; 70–80%; Smith: 50–60%; 60–70%

Republican primary results
| Party | Candidate | Votes | % |
|---|---|---|---|
| Republican | Laurie Buckhout | 33,893 | 53.5 |
| Republican | Sandy Smith | 29,471 | 46.5 |
| Total votes | | 63,364 | 100.0 |

=== Libertarian primary ===
==== Nominee ====
- Tom Bailey (Libertarian), former chair of the Guilford County Libertarian Party, perennial candidate, and nominee for U.S. Senate in 2004

=== General election ===
==== Predictions ====
| Source | Ranking | As of |
|---|---|---|
| The Cook Political Report | Tossup | November 10, 2023 |
| Inside Elections | Tilt D | October 10, 2024 |
| Sabato's Crystal Ball | Lean D | October 24, 2024 |
| Elections Daily | Lean D | November 4, 2024 |
| CNalysis | Lean D | November 4, 2024 |
| Decision Desk HQ | Lean D | October 11, 2024 |

==== Polling ====
| Poll source | Date(s) administered | Sample size (Note: Key: A – all adults RV – registered voters LV – likely voters V – unclear) | Margin of error | Don Davis (D) | Laurie Buckhout (R) | Tom Bailey (L) | Undecided |
|---|---|---|---|---|---|---|---|
| GQR (D) (Note: Poll sponsored by Davis's campaign) | October 9–13, 2024 | 400 (LV) | ± 4.9% | 50% | 39% | 6% | 5% |
| Noble Predictive Insights (Note: Poll sponsored by Inside Elections) | September 24–30, 2024 | 404 (LV) | ± 4.9% | 42% | 34% | 3% | 21% |
| Noble Predictive Insights | September 24–30, 2024 | 404 (LV) | ± 4.9% | 42% | 36% | – | 22% |

==== Results ====
2024 North Carolina's 1st congressional district election
| Party | Candidate | Votes | % |
|---|---|---|---|
| Democratic | Don Davis (incumbent) | 186,341 | 49.5 |
| Republican | Laurie Buckhout | 180,034 | 47.8 |
| Libertarian | Tom Bailey | 9,949 | 2.6 |
| Total votes | | 376,324 | 100.0 |
| Democratic hold | | | |

== District 2 ==
2024 North Carolina's 2nd congressional district election
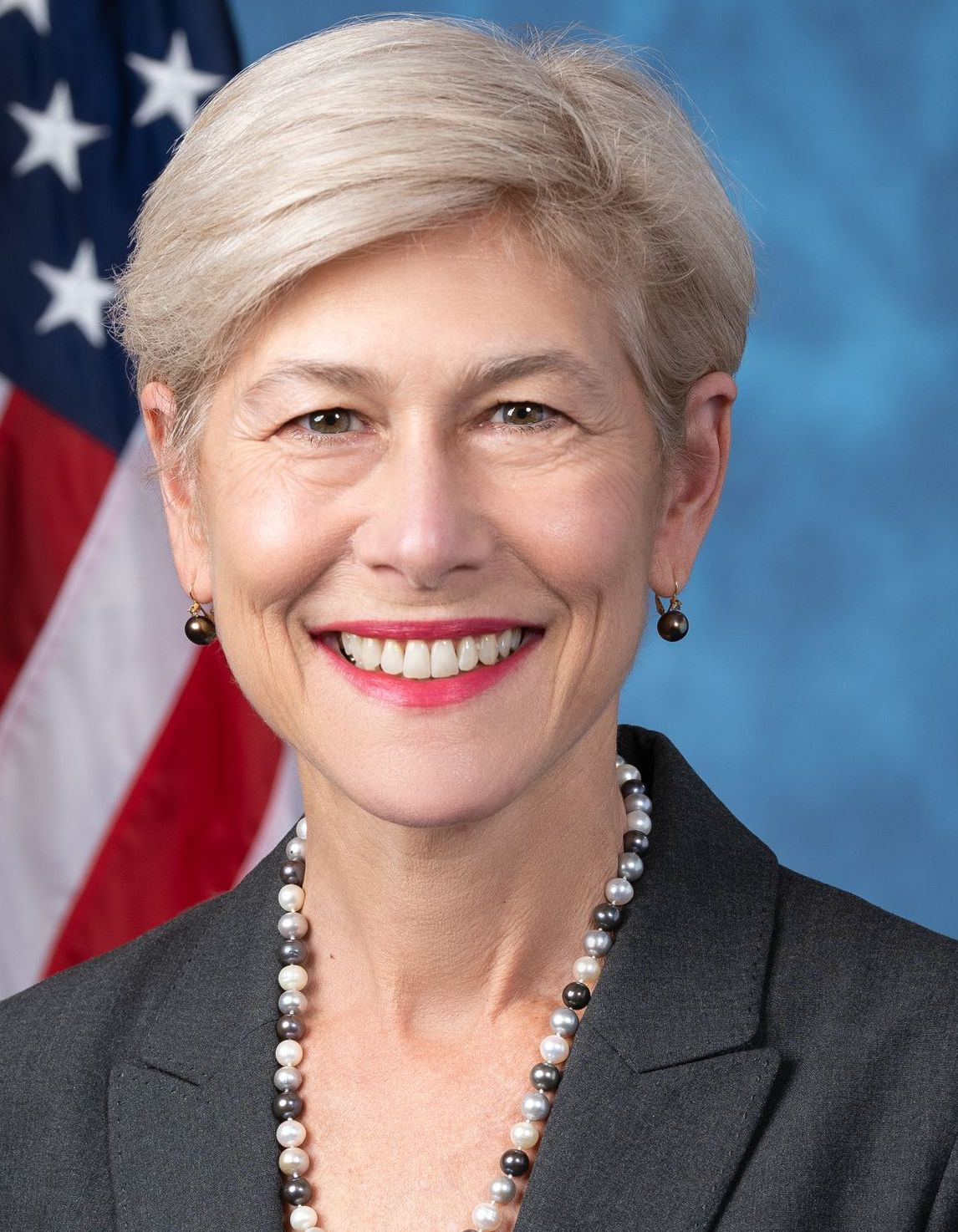

| Nominee | Deborah Ross | Alan Swain |
| Party | Democratic | Republican |
| Popular vote | 268,662 | 128,164 |
| Percentage | 66.3% | 31.6% |
- Precinct results Ross: 40–50% 50–60% 60–70% 70–80% 80–90% Swain: 40–50% 50–60% 60–70%
U.S. Representative before election
Deborah Ross
Democratic
Elected U.S. Representative
Deborah Ross
Democratic

The new 2nd district encompasses portions of central Wake County. The incumbent was Democrat Deborah Ross, who was re-elected with 64.7% of the vote in 2022.

=== Democratic primary ===
==== Nominee ====
- Deborah Ross, incumbent U.S. representative

==== Eliminated in primary ====
- Micheal Camero, business manager

==== Endorsements ====
Deborah Ross

Organizations

- AIPAC
- Democratic Majority for Israel
- Feminist Majority PAC
- Giffords (post-primary)
- Humane Society Legislative Fund
- Jewish Democratic Council of America
- League of Conservation Voters
- National Organization for Women PAC
- National Women's Political Caucus
- Pro-Israel America (post-primary)
- Sierra Club

Labor unions

- United Auto Workers

Newspapers

- The News & Observer (Democratic primary only)

==== Fundraising ====
Campaign finance reports as of February 14, 2024
| Candidate | Raised | Spent | Cash on hand |
|---|---|---|---|
| Deborah Ross (D) | $973,532 | $720,879 | $721,977 |
Source: Federal Election Commission

==== Results ====
Democratic primary results
| Party | Candidate | Votes | % |
|---|---|---|---|
| Democratic | Deborah Ross (incumbent) | 69,564 | 93.6 |
| Democratic | Micheal Camero | 4,761 | 6.4 |
| Total votes | | 74,325 | 100.0 |

=== Republican primary ===
==== Nominee ====
- Alan Swain, defense contractor and nominee for this district in 2020

==== Eliminated in primary ====
- Eugene Douglass, retired teacher
- Robert Morales, businessman

==== Withdrawn ====
- Kenny Xu, author (ran in the 13th district)

==== Endorsements ====
Alan Swain

Newspapers

- The News & Observer (Republican primary only)

==== Fundraising ====
Campaign finance reports as of February 14, 2024
| Candidate | Raised | Spent | Cash on hand |
|---|---|---|---|
| Alan Swain (R) | $4,654 | $146 | $6,504 |
Source: Federal Election Commission

==== Results ====
Republican primary results
| Party | Candidate | Votes | % |
|---|---|---|---|
| Republican | Alan Swain | 25,759 | 59.5 |
| Republican | Eugene Douglass | 9,751 | 22.5 |
| Republican | Robert Morales | 7,747 | 17.9 |
| Total votes | | 43,257 | 100.0 |

=== Green primary ===
==== Nominee ====
- Michael Dublin (Green), teacher

==== Endorsements ====
Michael Dublin

Political parties

- North Carolina Green Party

=== General election ===
==== Predictions ====
| Source | Ranking | As of |
|---|---|---|
| The Cook Political Report | Solid D | November 10, 2023 |
| Inside Elections | Solid D | October 27, 2023 |
| Sabato's Crystal Ball | Safe D | October 26, 2023 |
| Elections Daily | Safe D | October 26, 2023 |
| CNalysis | Solid D | November 16, 2023 |
| Decision Desk HQ | Safe D | June 1, 2024 |

==== Results ====
2024 North Carolina's 2nd congressional district election
| Party | Candidate | Votes | % |
|---|---|---|---|
| Democratic | Deborah Ross (incumbent) | 268,662 | 66.3 |
| Republican | Alan Swain | 128,164 | 31.6 |
| Green | Michael Dublin | 8,691 | 2.1 |
| Total votes | | 405,517 | 100.0 |
| Democratic hold | | | |

== District 3 ==
2024 North Carolina's 3rd congressional district election
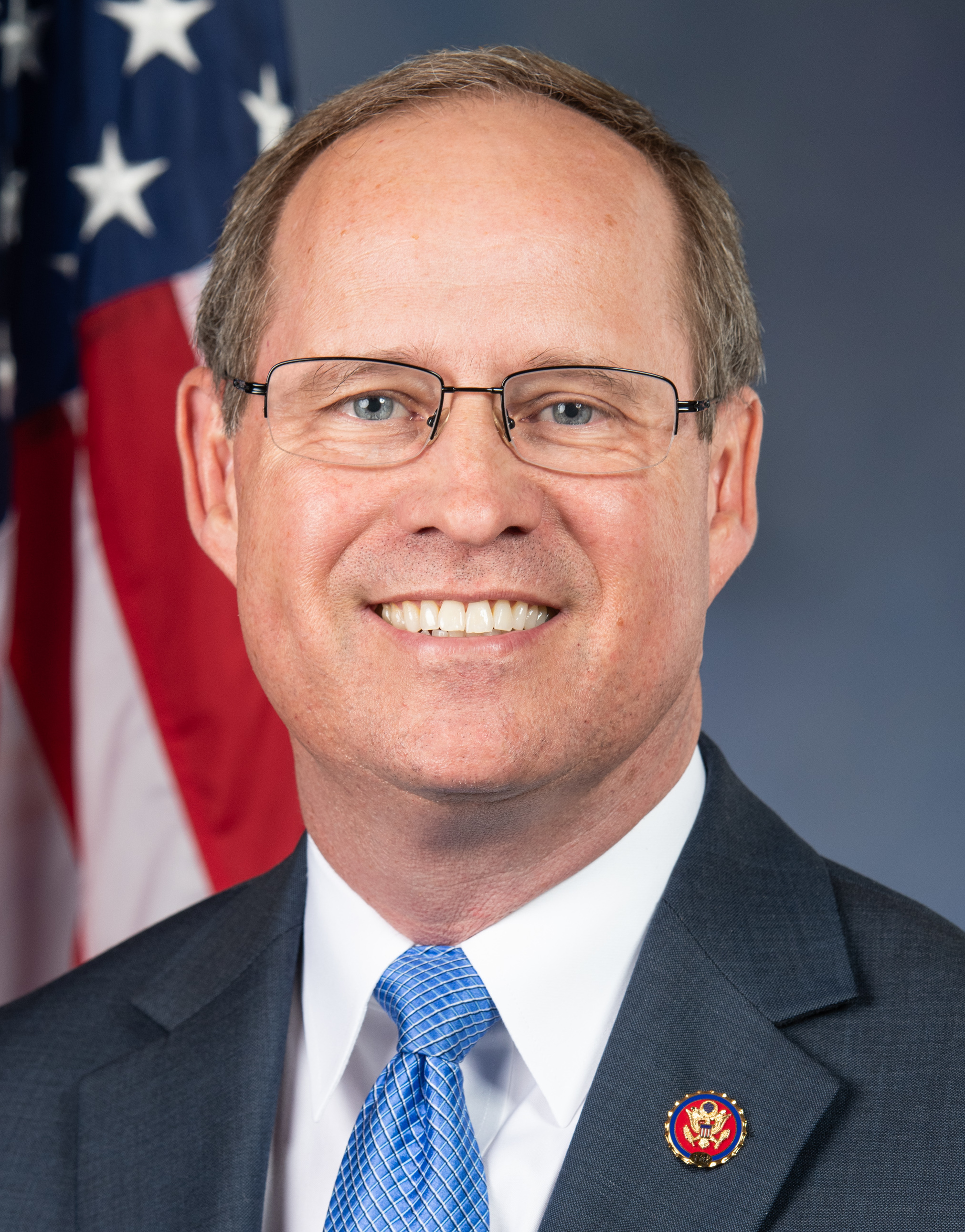

| Nominee | Greg Murphy | Gheorghe Cormos |
| Party | Republican | Libertarian |
| Popular vote | 248,276 | 72,565 |
| Percentage | 77.4% | 22.6% |
- Murphy: 50–60% 60–70% 70–80% 80–90% >90% Cormos: 50–60% 60–70%
U.S. Representative before election
Greg Murphy
Republican
Elected U.S. Representative
Greg Murphy
Republican

The new 3rd district includes all of Beaufort, Carteret, Craven, Dare, Duplin, Hyde, Jones, Onslow, Pamlico, and Pitt counties, as well as most of Sampson County. The incumbent was Republican Greg Murphy, who was re-elected with 66.9% of the vote in 2022.

=== Republican primary ===
==== Nominee ====
- Greg Murphy, incumbent U.S. representative

==== Endorsements ====
Greg Murphy

Organizations

- National Rifle Association Political Victory Fund

==== Fundraising ====
Campaign finance reports as of February 14, 2024
| Candidate | Raised | Spent | Cash on hand |
|---|---|---|---|
| Greg Murphy (R) | $1,009,171 | $544,989 | $1,273,695 |
Source: Federal Election Commission

=== Libertarian primary ===
==== Nominee ====
- Gheorghe Cormos, lawyer

=== General election ===
==== Predictions ====
| Source | Ranking | As of |
|---|---|---|
| The Cook Political Report | Solid R | November 10, 2023 |
| Inside Elections | Solid R | October 27, 2023 |
| Sabato's Crystal Ball | Safe R | October 26, 2023 |
| Elections Daily | Safe R | October 26, 2023 |
| CNalysis | Solid R | November 16, 2023 |
| Decision Desk HQ | Safe R | June 1, 2024 |

==== Results ====
2024 North Carolina's 3rd congressional district election
| Party | Candidate | Votes | % |
|---|---|---|---|
| Republican | Greg Murphy (incumbent) | 248,276 | 77.4 |
| Libertarian | Gheorghe Cormos | 72,565 | 22.6 |
| Total votes | | 320,841 | 100.0 |
| Republican hold | | | |

== District 4 ==
2024 North Carolina's 4th congressional district election
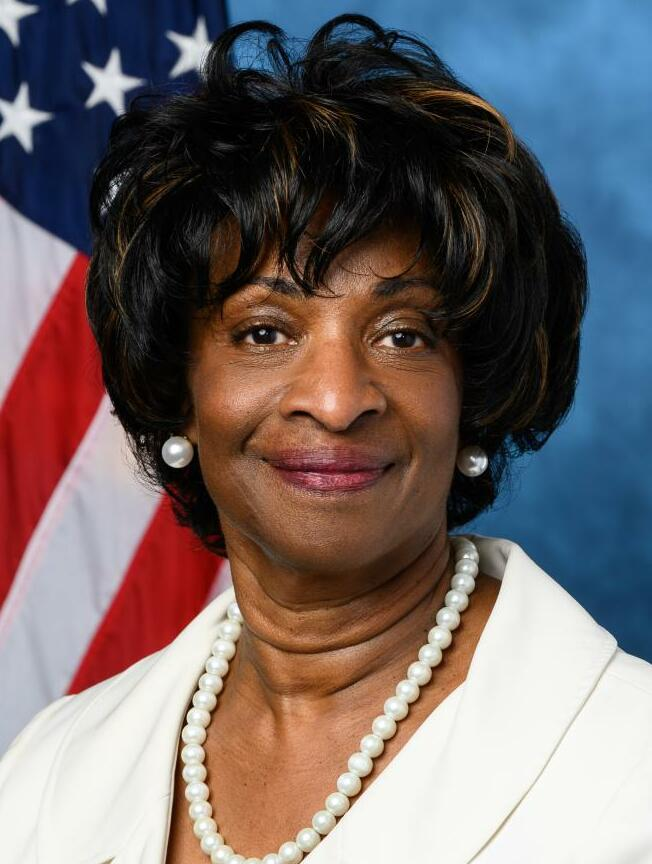

| Nominee | Valerie Foushee | Eric Blankenburg |
| Party | Democratic | Republican |
| Popular vote | 308,064 | 112,084 |
| Percentage | 71.9% | 26.1% |
- Foushee: 40–50% 50–60% 60–70% 70–80% 80–90% >90% Blankenburg: 40–50% 50–60% 60–70%
U.S. Representative before election
Valerie Foushee
Democratic
Elected U.S. Representative
Valerie Foushee
Democratic

The new 4th district includes all of Durham and Orange counties, as well as portions of northern Chatham and western Wake counties. The incumbent was Democrat Valerie Foushee, who was elected to a first term with 66.9% of the vote in 2022.

=== Democratic primary ===
==== Nominee ====
- Valerie Foushee, incumbent U.S. representative

==== Endorsements ====
Valerie Foushee

Organizations

- AIPAC
- Democratic Majority for Israel
- Feminist Majority PAC
- Jewish Democratic Council of America
- League of Conservation Voters
- National Women's Political Caucus
- Sierra Club

==== Fundraising ====
Campaign finance reports as of February 14, 2024
| Candidate | Raised | Spent | Cash on hand |
|---|---|---|---|
| Valerie Foushee (D) | $332,167 | $338,008 | $121,869 |
Source: Federal Election Commission

=== Republican primary ===
==== Nominee ====
- Eric Blankenburg, tech executive

==== Eliminated in primary ====
- Mahesh (Max) Ganorkar, homebuilding contractor and candidate for the 2nd district in 2022

==== Endorsements ====
Eric Blankenburg

Newspapers

- The News & Observer (Republican primary only)

==== Results ====
Republican primary results
| Party | Candidate | Votes | % |
|---|---|---|---|
| Republican | Eric Blankenburg | 25,254 | 70.4 |
| Republican | Mahesh Ganorkar | 10,597 | 29.6 |
| Total votes | | 35,851 | 100.0 |

=== Libertarian primary ===
==== Nominee ====
- Guy Meilleur (Libertarian), arborist and perennial candidate

=== General election ===
==== Predictions ====
| Source | Ranking | As of |
|---|---|---|
| The Cook Political Report | Solid D | November 10, 2023 |
| Inside Elections | Solid D | October 27, 2023 |
| Sabato's Crystal Ball | Safe D | October 26, 2023 |
| Elections Daily | Safe D | October 26, 2023 |
| CNalysis | Solid D | November 16, 2023 |
| Decision Desk HQ | Safe D | June 1, 2024 |

==== Results ====
2024 North Carolina's 4th congressional district election
| Party | Candidate | Votes | % |
|---|---|---|---|
| Democratic | Valerie Foushee (incumbent) | 308,064 | 71.9 |
| Republican | Eric Blankenburg | 112,084 | 26.1 |
| Libertarian | Guy Meilleur | 8,632 | 2.0 |
| Total votes | | 428,780 | 100.0 |
| Democratic hold | | | |

== District 5 ==
2024 North Carolina's 5th congressional district election
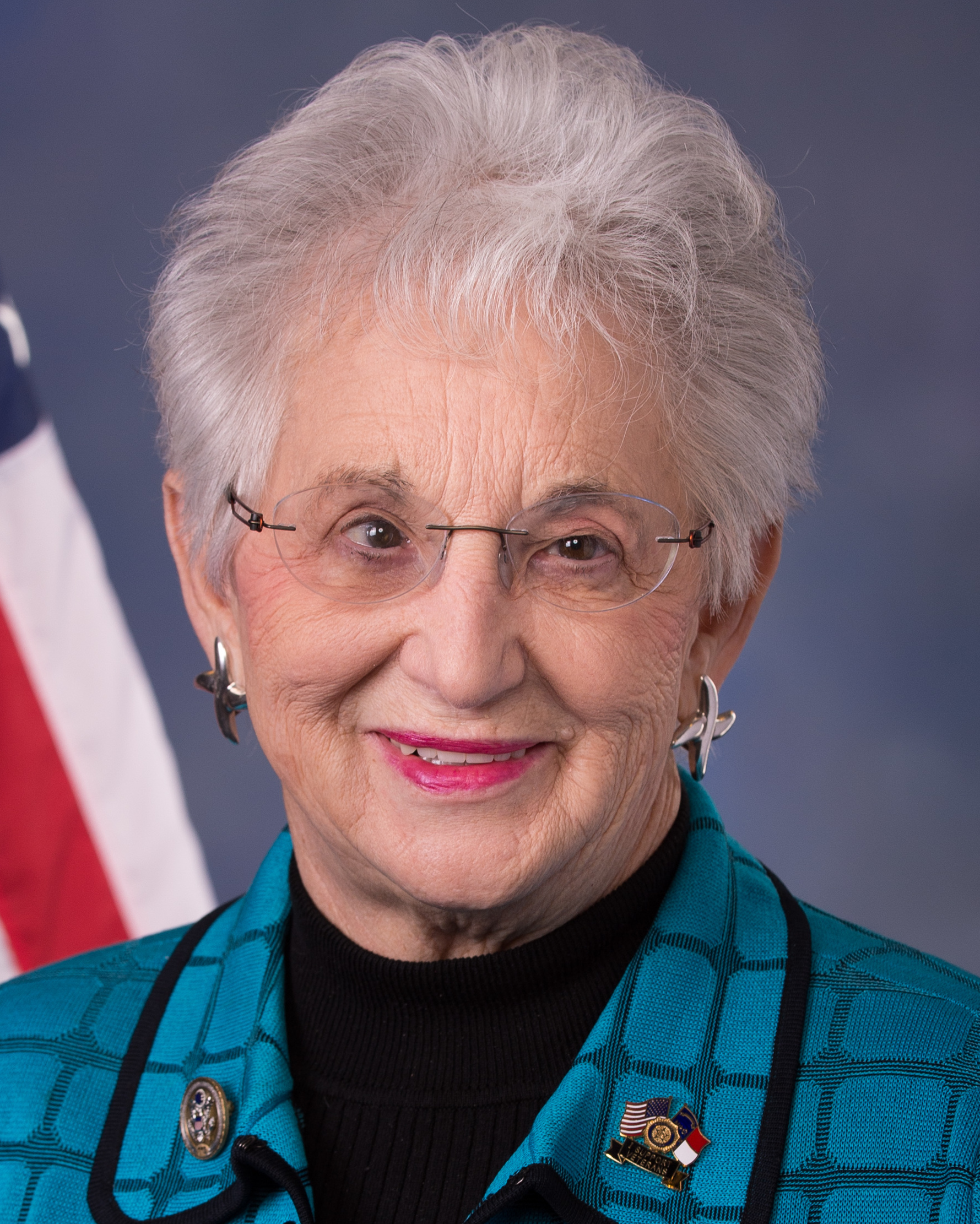

| Nominee | Virginia Foxx | Chuck Hubbard |
| Party | Republican | Democratic |
| Popular vote | 238,304 | 162,390 |
| Percentage | 59.5% | 40.5% |
- Foxx: 60–70% 70–80% 80–90% Hubbard: 50–60% 60–70%
U.S. Representative before election
Virginia Foxx (Republican)
Kathy Manning (Democratic)
Elected U.S. Representative
Virginia Foxx
Republican

The new 5th district includes all of Alexander, Alleghany, Ashe, Caldwell, Rockingham, Stokes, Surry, Watauga, and Wilkes counties, as well as portions of Guilford County. Due to redistricting, the district has two incumbents, Republican Virginia Foxx, who was re-elected with 63.2% of the vote in 2022, and Democrat Kathy Manning, who was re-elected with 54.5% of the vote in 2022. However, on December 7, 2023, Manning announced she would retire after two terms in office, choosing to retire instead of running for re-election due to being placed into a much more Republican-leaning district than before.

=== Republican primary ===
==== Nominee ====
- Virginia Foxx, incumbent U.S. representative

==== Eliminated in primary ====
- Ryan Mayberry, former Alexander County commissioner

==== Endorsements ====
Virginia Foxx

Executive branch officials

- Donald Trump, 45th president of the United States

Organizations

- AIPAC
- FRC Action
- International Franchise Association
- National Rifle Association Political Victory Fund
- National Right to Life Committee
- Pro-Israel America
- Republican Jewish Coalition

Newspapers

- Rhino Times

==== Fundraising ====
Campaign finance reports as of February 14, 2024
| Candidate | Raised | Spent | Cash on hand |
|---|---|---|---|
| Virginia Foxx (R) | $1,241,936 | $872,817 | $2,882,144 |
| Ryan Mayberry (R) | $116,280 | $108,563 | $3,269 |
Source: Federal Election Commission

==== Results ====
Primary results by county: Foxx: 60–70%; 70–80%; Mayberry: 50–60%

Republican primary results
| Party | Candidate | Votes | % |
|---|---|---|---|
| Republican | Virginia Foxx (incumbent) | 62,120 | 67.8 |
| Republican | Ryan Mayberry | 29,457 | 32.2 |
| Total votes | | 91,577 | 100.0 |

=== Democratic primary ===
==== Nominee ====
- Chuck Hubbard, retired newspaper reporter

==== Declined ====
- Kathy Manning, incumbent U.S. representative

==== Fundraising ====
Campaign finance reports as of February 14, 2024
| Candidate | Raised | Spent | Cash on hand |
|---|---|---|---|
| Chuck Hubbard (D) | $123,887 (Note: $20,000 of this total was self-funded by Hubbard) | $104,225 | $19,662 |
Source: Federal Election Commission

=== General election ===
==== Predictions ====
| Source | Ranking | As of |
|---|---|---|
| The Cook Political Report | Solid R | November 10, 2023 |
| Inside Elections | Solid R | October 27, 2023 |
| Sabato's Crystal Ball | Safe R | October 26, 2023 |
| Elections Daily | Safe R | October 26, 2023 |
| CNalysis | Solid R | November 16, 2023 |
| Decision Desk HQ | Safe R | June 1, 2024 |

==== Results ====
2024 North Carolina's 5th congressional district election
| Party | Candidate | Votes | % |
|---|---|---|---|
| Republican | Virginia Foxx (incumbent) | 238,304 | 59.5 |
| Democratic | Chuck Hubbard | 162,390 | 40.5 |
| Total votes | | 400,694 | 100.0 |
| Republican hold | | | |

== District 6 ==
2024 North Carolina's 6th congressional district election
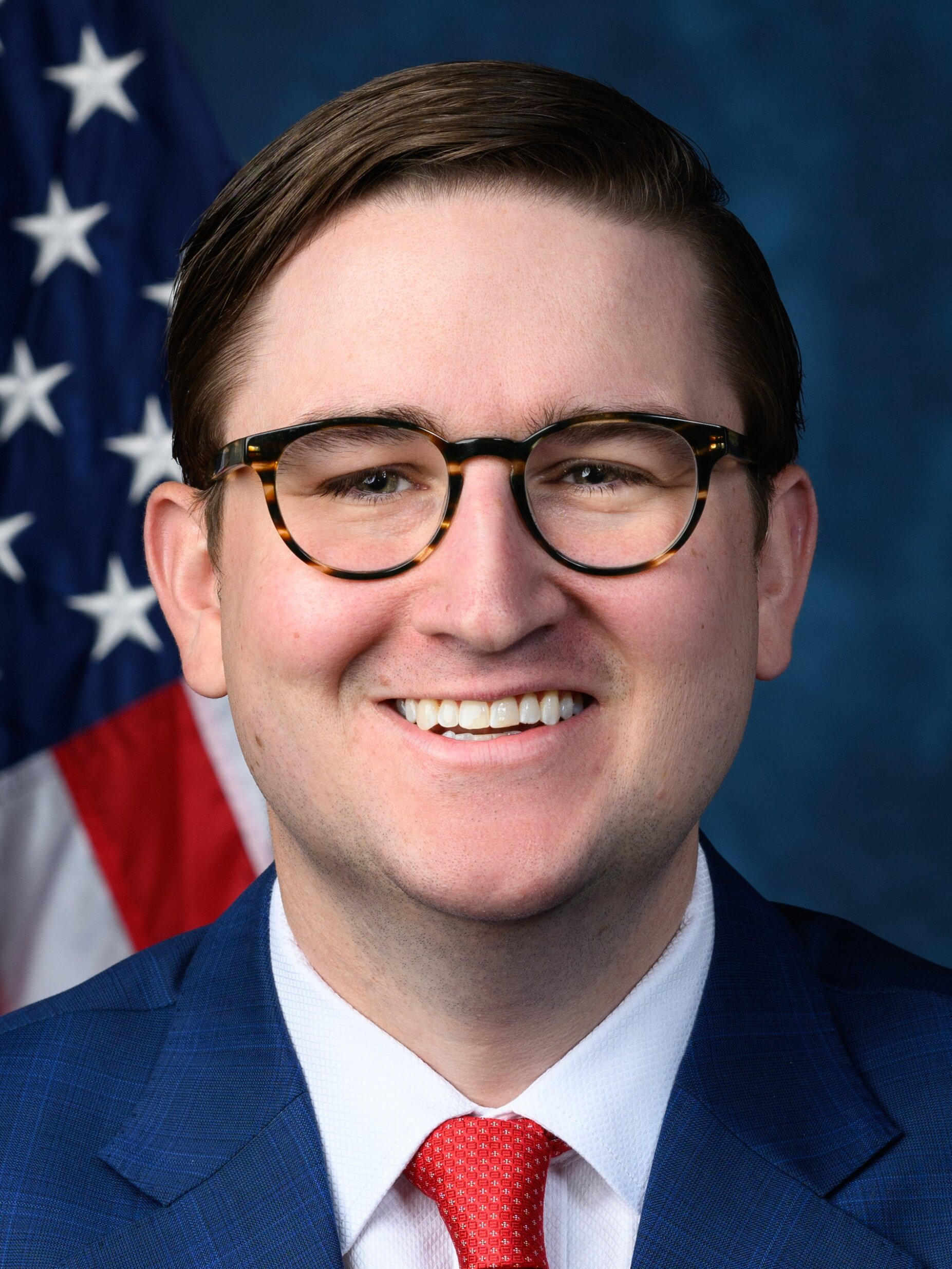

| Nominee | Addison McDowell | Kevin Hayes |
| Party | Republican | Constitution |
| Popular vote | 233,303 | 104,017 |
| Percentage | 69.2% | 30.8% |
- McDowell: 50–60% 60–70% 70–80% 80–90% >90% Hayes: 50–60% 60–70% 70–80% 80–90% 60–70% 70–80% 80–90%
U.S. Representative before election
None
(New seat)
Elected U.S. Representative
Addison McDowell
Republican

The new 6th district includes all of Davidson, Davie, and Rowan counties, as well as portions of northwestern Cabarrus County, western Forsyth County, and southwestern Guilford County. Prior to redistricting, the incumbent was Democrat Kathy Manning; however, Manning was drawn out of the 6th district and into the 5th, leaving the district with no incumbent, as Manning instead chose to retire. Addison McDowell was the Republican nominee for this district, after he received the most votes in the March primary and former congressman Mark Walker withdrew from the race, forgoing a runoff election.

As of 2025, Constitution Party candidate for this district Kevin Hayes is the best performing US House candidate in the party's history, in terms of both percentage and raw vote total.

=== Democratic primary ===
==== Withdrawn ====
- Kathy Manning, incumbent U.S. representative from the 5th district

=== Republican primary ===
==== Nominee ====
- Addison McDowell, healthcare lobbyist

==== Advanced to runoff but withdrew ====
- Mark Walker, former U.S. representative (2015–2021) and candidate for U.S. Senate in 2022

==== Eliminated in primary ====
- Christian Castelli, businessman and nominee for this district in 2022 (endorsed McDowell in runoff)
- Mary Ann Contogiannis, plastic surgeon and candidate for this district in 2022
- Bo Hines, lawyer, former college football player, and nominee for the 13th district in 2022
- Jay Wagner, mayor of High Point

==== Endorsements ====
Christian Castelli

Statewide officials

- ~~Mark Robinson, lieutenant governor of North Carolina (2021–2025)~~ (denied by Robinson)

Individuals

- ~~Richard Petty, NASCAR driver~~ (denied by Petty)
Bo Hines

Organizations

- Club for Growth PAC
Addison McDowell

Executive branch officials

- Donald Trump, 45th president of the United States (2017–2021)

Individuals

- Donald Trump Jr., businessman and son of former president Donald Trump

Organizations

- AIPAC
Mark Walker

U.S. cabinet officials

- ~~Mike Pompeo, former U.S. Secretary of State (2018–2021)~~ (denied by Pompeo)

U.S. senators

- ~~Markwayne Mullin, U.S. senator from Oklahoma (2023–present)~~ (denied by Mullin)

U.S. representatives

- ~~Gus Bilirakis, U.S. representative from Florida's 12th congressional district (2007–present)~~ (withdrew endorsement due to fundraising with Castelli)
- ~~Matt Gaetz, U.S. representative from Florida's 1st congressional district (2017–present)~~ (denied by Gaetz)
- ~~Mike Johnson, U.S. representative from Louisiana's 4th congressional district (2017–present) and Speaker of the House (2023–present)~~ (withdrew endorsement due to becoming Speaker of the House)

Organizations

- FRC Action
- National Rifle Association Political Victory Fund

Newspapers

- Rhino Times
Declined to endorse

U.S. cabinet officials

- Mike Pompeo, former U.S. Secretary of State (2018–2021)

U.S. senators

- Markwayne Mullin, U.S. senator from Oklahoma (2023–present)

U.S. representatives

- Gus Bilirakis, U.S. representative from Florida's 12th congressional district (2007–present) (previously endorsed Walker)
- Matt Gaetz, U.S. representative from Florida's 1st congressional district (2017–present)
- Mike Johnson, U.S. Representative from Louisiana's 4th congressional district (2017–present) and Speaker of the House (2023–present) (previously endorsed Walker)

Statewide officials

- Mark Robinson, lieutenant governor of North Carolina (2021–2025)

Individuals

- Richard Petty, NASCAR driver

==== Fundraising ====
Campaign finance reports as of February 14, 2024
| Candidate | Raised | Spent | Cash on hand |
|---|---|---|---|
| Christian Castelli (R) | $827,154 (Note: $500,000 of this total was self-funded by Castelli) | $373,990 | $459,853 |
| Mary Ann Contogiannis (R) | $128,699 (Note: $86,600 of this total was self-funded by Contogiannis) | $127,343 | $9,860 |
| Bo Hines (R) | $1,081,897 (Note: $601,500 of this total was self-funded by Hines) | $972,486 | $113,805 |
| Addison McDowell (R) | $219,540 | $173,578 | $45,961 |
| Jay Wagner (R) | $165,935 (Note: $50,000 of this total was self-funded by Wagner) | $147,530 | $18,404 |
| Mark Walker (R) | $689,873 | $436,380 | $276,135 |
Source: Federal Election Commission

==== Polling ====
| Poll source | Date(s) administered | Sample size | Margin of error | Christian Castelli | Mary Ann Contogiannis | Bo Hines | Addison McDowell | Jay Wagner | Mark Walker | Undecided |
|---|---|---|---|---|---|---|---|---|---|---|
| Ragnar Research (Note: Poll sponsored by Awake Carolina) | December 18–20, 2023 | 400 (LV) | ± 4.0% | 3% | 1% | 10% | 1% | 3% | 23% | 58% |

==== Results ====
Primary results by county: McDowell: 20–30%; 30–40%; Walker: 20–30%; Castelli: 20–30%

Republican primary results
| Party | Candidate | Votes | % |
|---|---|---|---|
| Republican | Addison McDowell | 21,285 | 26.1 |
| Republican | Mark Walker | 19,633 | 24.1 |
| Republican | Christian Castelli | 17,171 | 21.1 |
| Republican | Bo Hines | 11,746 | 14.4 |
| Republican | Jay Wagner | 7,462 | 9.2 |
| Republican | Mary Ann Contogiannis | 4,195 | 5.1 |
| Total votes | | 81,492 | 100.0 |

=== Constitution Party ===
==== Nominee ====
- Kevin Hayes, business owner

=== General election ===
==== Predictions ====
| Source | Ranking | As of |
|---|---|---|
| The Cook Political Report | Solid R (flip) | November 10, 2023 |
| Inside Elections | Likely R (flip) | October 27, 2023 |
| Sabato's Crystal Ball | Safe R (flip) | October 26, 2023 |
| Elections Daily | Safe R (flip) | October 26, 2023 |
| CNalysis | Solid R (flip) | November 16, 2023 |
| Decision Desk HQ | Safe R (flip) | June 1, 2024 |

==== Results ====
2024 North Carolina's 6th congressional district election
| Party | Candidate | Votes | % |
|---|---|---|---|
| Republican | Addison McDowell | 233,303 | 69.2 |
| Constitution | Kevin Hayes | 104,017 | 30.8 |
| Total votes | | 337,320 | 100.0 |
| Republican gain from Democratic | | | |

== District 7 ==
2024 North Carolina's 7th congressional district election
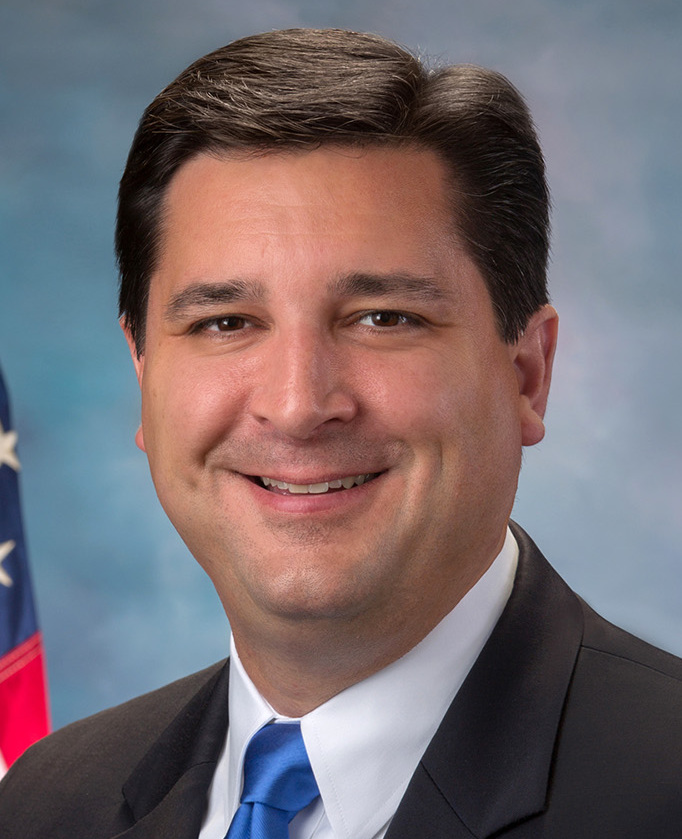

| Nominee | David Rouzer | Marlando Pridgen |
| Party | Republican | Democratic |
| Popular vote | 254,022 | 179,512 |
| Percentage | 58.6% | 41.4% |
- Rouzer: 50–60% 60–70% 70–80% 80–90% >90% Pridgen: 50–60% 60–70% 70–80% 80–90% >90% Tie: 50%
U.S. Representative before election
David Rouzer
Republican
Elected U.S. Representative
David Rouzer
Republican

The new 7th district includes all of Bladen, Brunswick, Columbus, New Hanover, and Pender counties, as well as most of Cumberland County, and portions of eastern Robeson County and northwestern Sampson County. The incumbent was Republican David Rouzer, who was re-elected with 57.7% of the vote in 2022.

=== Republican primary ===
==== Nominee ====
- David Rouzer, incumbent U.S. representative

==== Endorsements ====
David Rouzer

Organizations

- AIPAC
- International Franchise Association
- National Rifle Association Political Victory Fund
- U.S. Chamber of Commerce (post-primary)

==== Fundraising ====
Campaign finance reports as of February 14, 2024
| Candidate | Raised | Spent | Cash on hand |
|---|---|---|---|
| David Rouzer (R) | $820,087 | $841,893 | $1,594,473 |
Source: Federal Election Commission

=== Democratic primary ===
==== Nominee ====
- Marlando Pridgen, economic development consultant

=== General election ===
==== Predictions ====
| Source | Ranking | As of |
|---|---|---|
| The Cook Political Report | Solid R | November 10, 2023 |
| Inside Elections | Solid R | October 27, 2023 |
| Sabato's Crystal Ball | Safe R | October 26, 2023 |
| Elections Daily | Safe R | October 26, 2023 |
| CNalysis | Solid R | November 16, 2023 |
| Decision Desk HQ | Safe R | June 1, 2024 |

==== Results ====
2024 North Carolina's 7th congressional district election
| Party | Candidate | Votes | % |
|---|---|---|---|
| Republican | David Rouzer (incumbent) | 254,022 | 58.6 |
| Democratic | Marlando Pridgen | 179,512 | 41.4 |
| Total votes | | 433,534 | 100.0 |
| Republican hold | | | |

== District 8 ==
2024 North Carolina's 8th congressional district election
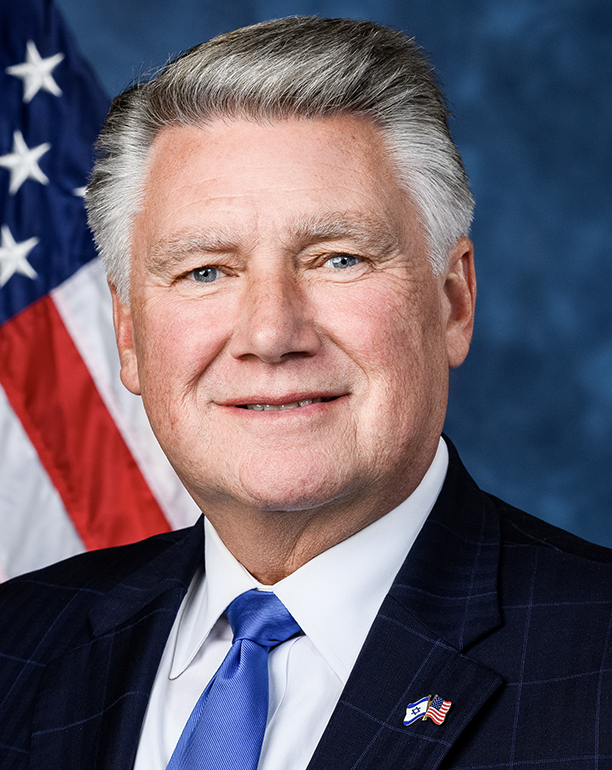

| Nominee | Mark Harris | Justin Dues |
| Party | Republican | Democratic |
| Popular vote | 238,640 | 161,709 |
| Percentage | 59.6% | 40.4% |
- Harris: 50–60% 60–70% 70–80% Dues: 50–60%
U.S. Representative before election
Dan Bishop
Republican
Elected U.S. Representative
Mark Harris
Republican

The new 8th district includes all of Anson, Montgomery, Richmond, Scotland, Stanly, and Union counties, as well as most of Cabarrus County, portions of southern Mecklenburg County, and most of Robeson County. The incumbent was Republican Dan Bishop, who was re-elected with 69.9% of the vote in 2022.

=== Republican primary ===
==== Nominee ====
- Mark Harris, pastor, apparent winner of the voided 2018 election (Note: Harris was narrowly elected to this seat in 2018, but the results were annulled and a new election held after state investigators alleged that political operatives hired by Harris' campaign committed electoral fraud.) for this district, (Note: This district was numbered as the 9th district prior to the 2020 redistricting cycle.) and candidate for U.S. Senate in 2014

==== Eliminated in primary ====
- Allan Baucom, chair of the Union County Board of Soil and Water Supervisors and former Union County commissioner
- John Bradford, state representative from the 98th district (2015–2019, 2021–present) (previously ran for state treasurer)
- Don Brown, attorney and author
- Leigh Brown, realtor and candidate for this district in 2019
- Chris Maples, executive director of external affairs at UNC–Pembroke and former district director for incumbent Dan Bishop

==== Declined ====
- Dan Bishop, incumbent U.S. representative (ran for attorney general)
- Tricia Cotham, state representative from the 112th district (2007–2017, 2023–present) and candidate for the 12th district in 2016 (ran for re-election)

==== Endorsements ====
John Bradford

Organizations

- BIPAC
- National Rifle Association Political Victory Fund
- United States Chamber of Commerce
Mark Harris

Statewide officials

- Mike Huckabee, former governor of Arkansas, candidate for President of the United States in 2008 and 2016
- Mark Robinson, lieutenant governor of North Carolina

Individuals

- Tony Perkins, president of the Family Research Council
- Ralph Reed, founder and chairman of the Faith and Freedom Coalition

Organizations

- AIPAC
- FRC Action
- House Freedom Fund
Chris Maples

Newspapers

- The Charlotte Observer

==== Fundraising ====
Campaign finance reports as of February 14, 2024
| Candidate | Raised | Spent | Cash on hand |
|---|---|---|---|
| Allan Baucom (R) | $1,063,700 (Note: $1,000,000 of this total was self-funded by Baucom) | $495,075 | $568,624 |
| John Bradford (R) | $1,516,834 (Note: $1,250,000 of this total was self-funded by Bradford) | $1,168,896 | $347,938 |
| Don Brown (R) | $48,998 | $39,226 | $9,771 |
| Leigh Brown (R) | $149,989 (Note: $100,000 of this total was self-funded by Harris) | $135,208 | $58,411 |
| Mark Harris (R) | $377,718 (Note: $75,000 of this total was self-funded by Harris) | $196,143 | $181,574 |
| Chris Maples (R) | $26,350 (Note: $20,000 of this total was self-funded by Maples) | $16,047 | $10,302 |
Source: Federal Election Commission

==== Results ====
Primary results by county: Harris: 20–30%; 30–40%; 40–50%; 50–60%; Baucom: 30–40%; 40–50%

Republican primary results
| Party | Candidate | Votes | % |
|---|---|---|---|
| Republican | Mark Harris | 24,764 | 30.4 |
| Republican | Allan Baucom | 21,964 | 27.0 |
| Republican | John Bradford | 14,458 | 17.8 |
| Republican | Don Brown | 8,519 | 10.5 |
| Republican | Leigh Brown | 7,845 | 9.6 |
| Republican | Chris Maples | 3,787 | 4.6 |
| Total votes | | 81,337 | 100.0 |

=== Democratic primary ===
==== Nominee ====
- Justin Dues, tech consultant

=== General election ===
==== Predictions ====
| Source | Ranking | As of |
|---|---|---|
| The Cook Political Report | Solid R | November 10, 2023 |
| Inside Elections | Solid R | October 27, 2023 |
| Sabato's Crystal Ball | Safe R | October 26, 2023 |
| Elections Daily | Safe R | October 26, 2023 |
| CNalysis | Solid R | November 16, 2023 |
| Decision Desk HQ | Safe R | June 1, 2024 |

==== Results ====
2024 North Carolina's 8th congressional district election
| Party | Candidate | Votes | % |
|---|---|---|---|
| Republican | Mark Harris | 238,640 | 59.6 |
| Democratic | Justin Dues | 161,709 | 40.4 |
| Total votes | | 400,349 | 100.0 |
| Republican hold | | | |

== District 9 ==
2024 North Carolina's 9th congressional district election
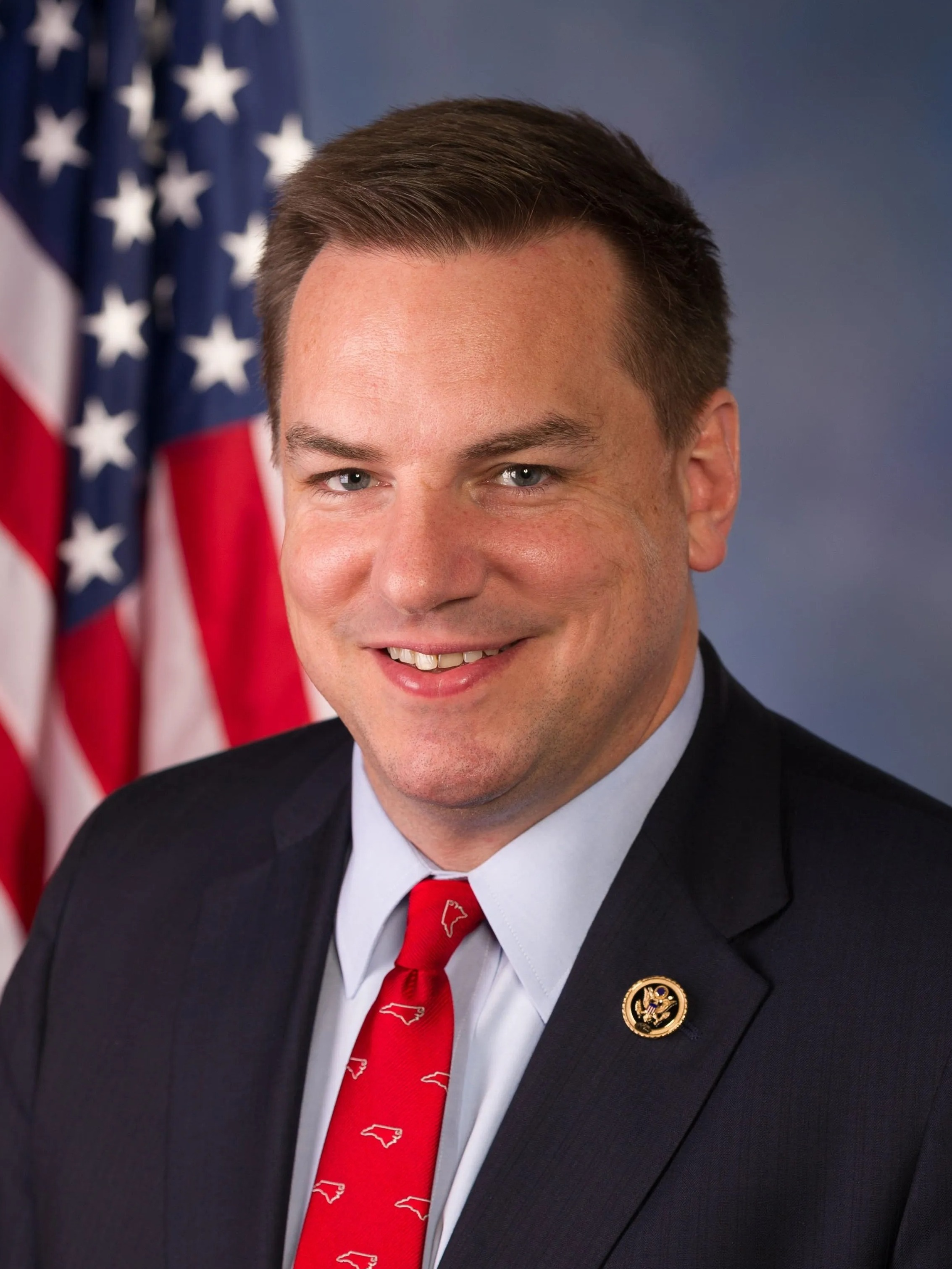

| Nominee | Richard Hudson | Nigel William Bristow | Shelane Etchison |
| Party | Republican | Democratic | Independent |
| Popular vote | 210,042 | 140,852 | 22,183 |
| Percentage | 56.3% | 37.8% | 5.9% |
- Hudson: 50–60% 60–70% 70–80% Bristow: 40–50% 60–70%
U.S. Representative before election
Richard Hudson
Republican
Elected U.S. Representative
Richard Hudson
Republican

The new 9th district includes all of Alamance, Hoke, Moore, and Randolph counties, as well as most of Chatham and Guilford counties, and portions of northwestern Cumberland County. The incumbent was Republican Richard Hudson who was re-elected with 56.5% of the vote in 2022.

=== Republican primary ===
==== Nominee ====
- Richard Hudson, incumbent U.S. representative

==== Eliminated in primary ====
- Troy Tarazon, systems engineer

==== Endorsements ====
Richard Hudson

Organizations

- AIPAC
- International Franchise Association
- National Rifle Association Political Victory Fund

Newspapers

- Rhino Times

==== Fundraising ====
Campaign finance reports as of February 14, 2024
| Candidate | Raised | Spent | Cash on hand |
|---|---|---|---|
| Richard Hudson (R) | $1,990,487 | $2,020,540 | $1,405,909 |
Source: Federal Election Commission

==== Results ====
Republican primary results
| Party | Candidate | Votes | % |
|---|---|---|---|
| Republican | Richard Hudson (incumbent) | 56,543 | 83.3 |
| Republican | Troy Tarazon | 11,307 | 16.7 |
| Total votes | | 67,850 | 100.0 |

=== Democratic primary ===
==== Nominee ====
- Nigel William Bristow, retired police officer

=== Independents ===
- Shelane Etchison, consultant

==== Endorsements ====
Shelane Etchison

Political parties

- Forward Party
- Reform Party

=== General election ===
==== Predictions ====
| Source | Ranking | As of |
|---|---|---|
| The Cook Political Report | Solid R | November 10, 2023 |
| Inside Elections | Solid R | October 27, 2023 |
| Sabato's Crystal Ball | Safe R | October 26, 2023 |
| Elections Daily | Safe R | October 26, 2023 |
| CNalysis | Solid R | November 16, 2023 |
| Decision Desk HQ | Safe R | June 1, 2024 |

==== Results ====
2024 North Carolina's 9th congressional district election
| Party | Candidate | Votes | % |
|---|---|---|---|
| Republican | Richard Hudson (incumbent) | 210,042 | 56.3 |
| Democratic | Nigel William Bristow | 140,852 | 37.8 |
| Independent | Shelane Etchison | 22,183 | 5.9 |
| Total votes | | 373,077 | 100.0 |
| Republican hold | | | |

== District 10 ==
2024 North Carolina's 10th congressional district election
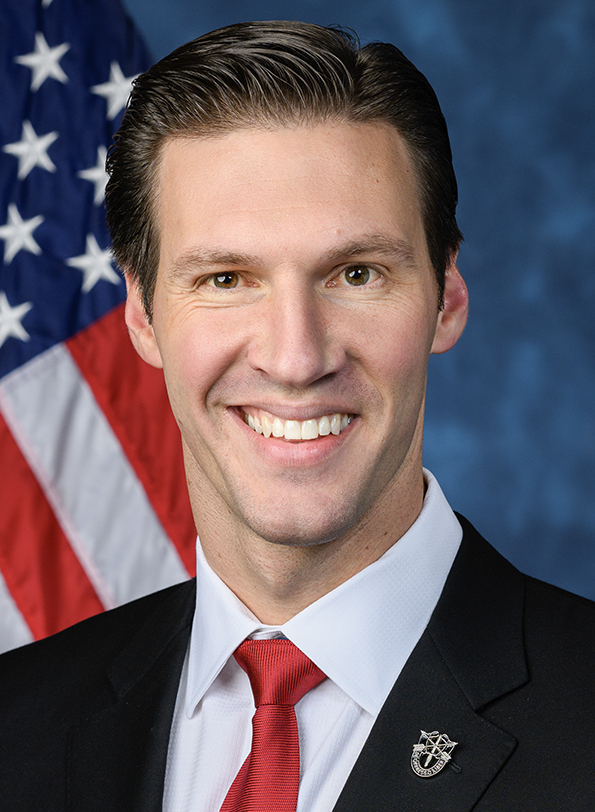

| Nominee | Pat Harrigan | Ralph Scott Jr. |
| Party | Republican | Democratic |
| Popular vote | 233,814 | 155,383 |
| Percentage | 57.5% | 38.2% |
- Harrigan: 60–70% 70–80% Scott: 50–60%
U.S. Representative before election
Patrick McHenry
Republican
Elected U.S. Representative
Pat Harrigan
Republican

The new 10th district includes all of Catawba, Iredell, Lincoln, and Yadkin counties, as well as most of Forsyth County. The incumbent was Republican Patrick McHenry, who was re-elected with 72.7% of the vote in 2022.

=== Republican primary ===
==== Nominee ====
- Pat Harrigan, firearms manufacturer and nominee for the 14th district in 2022 (previously ran in the 14th district)

==== Eliminated in primary ====
- Charles Eller, solar energy consultant
- Diana Jimison, write-in candidate for this district in 2022
- Brooke McGowan, activist
- Grey Mills, state representative from the 95th district (2009–2013, 2021–present)

==== Declined ====
- John Bradford, state representative from the 98th district (2015–2019, 2021–present) (ran in the 8th district)
- Dale Folwell, North Carolina State Treasurer (2017–present) (ran for governor)
- Patrick McHenry, incumbent U.S. representative
- Jason Saine, state representative from the 97th district (2011–present)
- Vickie Sawyer, state senator from the 37th district (2018–present)

==== Endorsements ====
Pat Harrigan

Statewide officials

- Mark Robinson, lieutenant governor of North Carolina

Organizations

- AIPAC
- Americans for Prosperity
- Republicans for National Renewal (post-primary)
- With Honor Fund
Grey Mills

State legislators

- Tim Moore, Speaker of the North Carolina House of Representatives (2015–present) from the 111th district (2003–present)

Organizations

- GOPAC
- Susan B. Anthony Pro-Life America

==== Fundraising ====
Campaign finance reports as of February 14, 2024
| Candidate | Raised | Spent | Cash on hand |
|---|---|---|---|
| Charles Eller (R) | $8,376 (Note: $500 of this total was self-funded by Eller) | $6,671 | $1,704 |
| Pat Harrigan (R) | $963,154 (Note: $503,000 of this total was self-funded by Harrigan) | $402,143 | $635,059 |
| Brooke McGowan (R) | $19,617 | $18,028 | $1,588 |
| Grey Mills (R) | $1,236,368 (Note: $1,025,000 of this total was self-funded by Mills) | $679,870 | $556,498 |
Source: Federal Election Commission

==== Results ====
Primary results by county: Harrigan: 40–50%; Mills: 50–60%

Republican primary results
| Party | Candidate | Votes | % |
|---|---|---|---|
| Republican | Pat Harrigan | 36,028 | 41.2 |
| Republican | Grey Mills | 34,000 | 38.9 |
| Republican | Brooke McGowan | 8,795 | 10.1 |
| Republican | Charles Eller | 6,076 | 6.9 |
| Republican | Diana Jimison | 2,535 | 2.9 |
| Total votes | | 87,434 | 100.0 |

=== Democratic primary ===
==== Nominee ====
- Ralph Scott Jr., U.S. Air Force veteran

=== Libertarian primary ===
==== Nominee ====
- Steven Feldman (Libertarian), research scientist

=== Constitution primary ===
==== Nominee ====
- Todd Helm

==== Fundraising ====
Campaign finance reports as of February 14, 2024
| Candidate | Raised | Spent | Cash on hand |
|---|---|---|---|
| Steven Feldman (L) | $26,740 | $2,130 | $24,609 |
Source: Federal Election Commission

=== General election ===
==== Predictions ====
| Source | Ranking | As of |
|---|---|---|
| The Cook Political Report | Solid R | November 10, 2023 |
| Inside Elections | Solid R | October 27, 2023 |
| Sabato's Crystal Ball | Safe R | October 26, 2023 |
| Elections Daily | Safe R | October 26, 2023 |
| CNalysis | Solid R | November 16, 2023 |
| Decision Desk HQ | Safe R | June 1, 2024 |

==== Results ====
2024 North Carolina's 10th congressional district election
| Party | Candidate | Votes | % |
|---|---|---|---|
| Republican | Pat Harrigan | 233,814 | 57.5 |
| Democratic | Ralph Scott Jr. | 155,383 | 38.2 |
| Libertarian | Steven Feldman | 11,614 | 2.9 |
| Constitution | Todd Helm | 5,884 | 1.4 |
| Total votes | | 406,695 | 100.0 |
| Republican hold | | | |

== District 11 ==
2024 North Carolina's 11th congressional district election
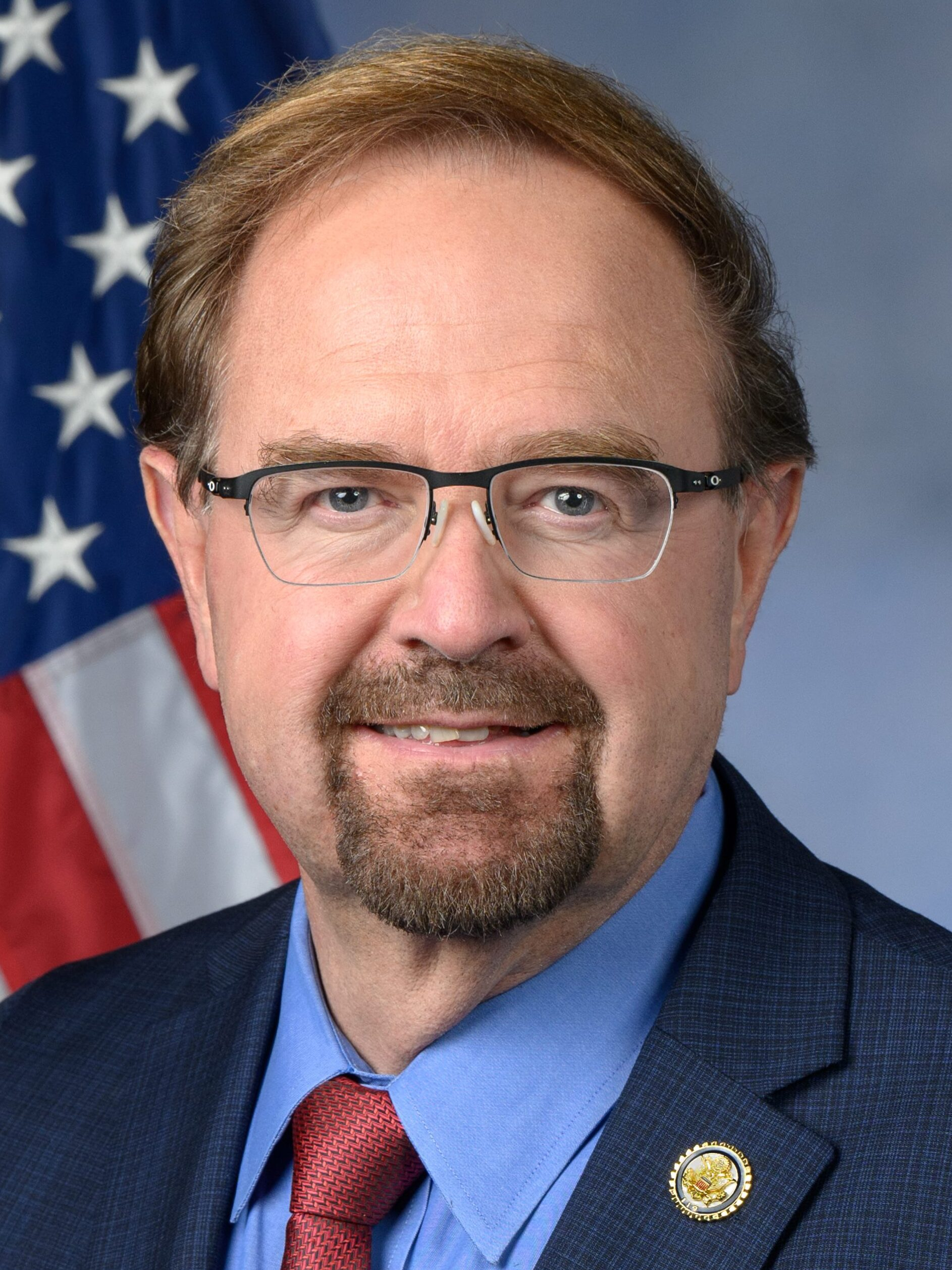

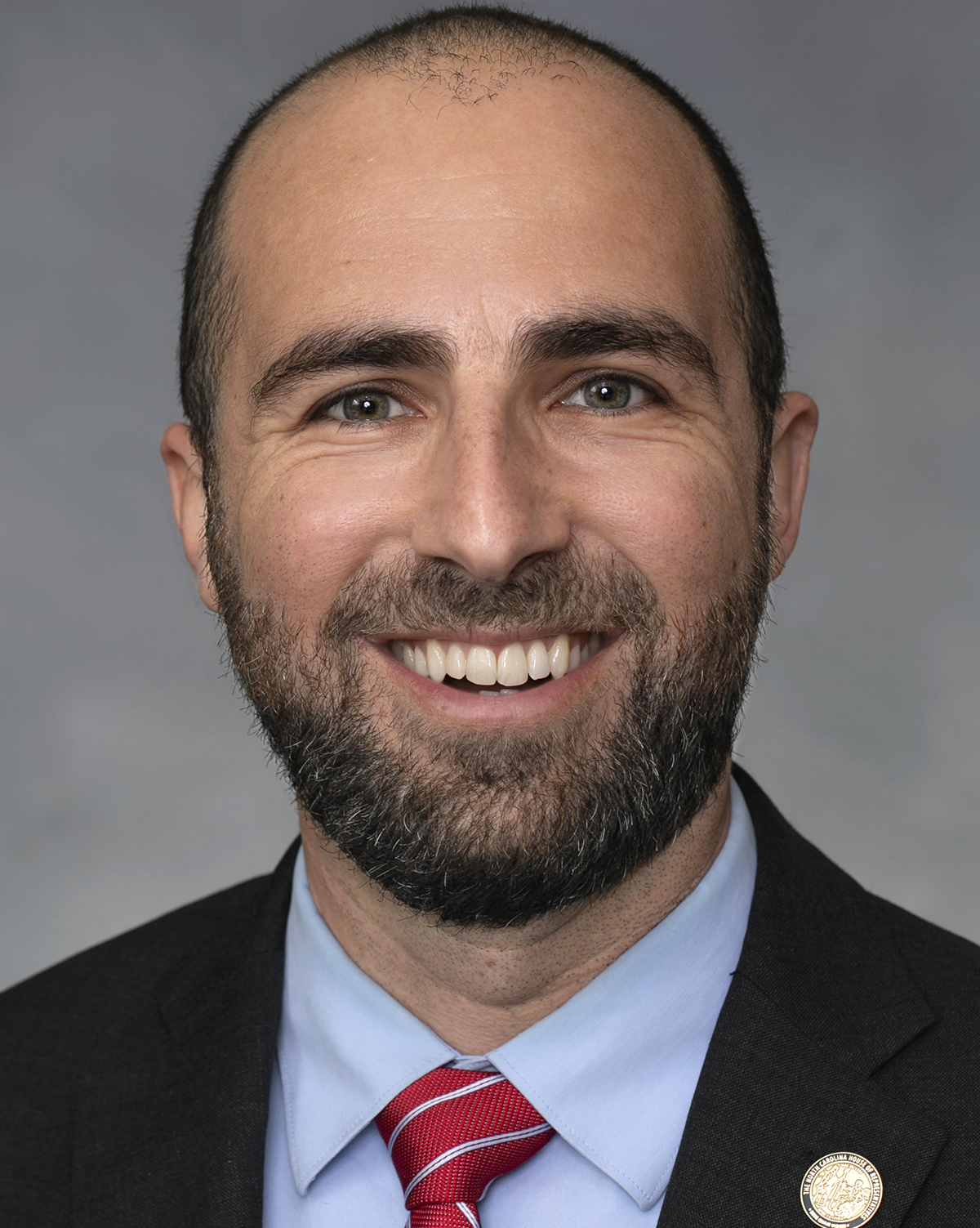
| Nominee | Chuck Edwards | Caleb Rudow |
| Party | Republican | Democratic |
| Popular vote | 245,546 | 186,977 |
| Percentage | 56.8% | 43.2% |
- Edwards: 50–60% 60–70% 70–80% 80–90% >90% Rudow: 50–60% 60–70% 70–80% 80–90% >90%
U.S. Representative before election
Chuck Edwards
Republican
Elected U.S. Representative
Chuck Edwards
Republican

The new 11th district includes all of Avery, Buncombe, Cherokee, Clay, Graham, Haywood, Henderson, Jackson, Macon, Madison, McDowell, Mitchell, Swain, Transylvania, and Yancey counties, as well as portions of Polk County. The incumbent was Republican Chuck Edwards, who was first elected with 53.8% of the vote in 2022.

=== Republican primary ===
==== Nominee ====
- Chuck Edwards, incumbent U.S. representative

==== Eliminated in primary ====
- Christian Reagan, mortgage broker

==== Endorsements ====
Chuck Edwards

Organizations

- AIPAC
- BIPAC
- National Rifle Association Political Victory Fund

=== Fundraising ===
Campaign finance reports as of February 14, 2024
| Candidate | Raised | Spent | Cash on hand |
|---|---|---|---|
| Chuck Edwards (R) | $954,874 | $741,055 | $311,711 |
| Christian Reagan (R) | $33,070 (Note: $14,684 of this total was self-funded by Reagan) | $31,850 | $1,219 |
Source: Federal Election Commission

==== Results ====
Republican primary results
| Party | Candidate | Votes | % |
|---|---|---|---|
| Republican | Chuck Edwards (incumbent) | 66,717 | 68.9 |
| Republican | Christian Reagan | 30,095 | 31.1 |
| Total votes | | 96,812 | 100.0 |

=== Democratic primary ===
==== Nominee ====
- Caleb Rudow, state representative from the 116th district (2022–present)

=== Fundraising ===
Campaign finance reports as of February 14, 2024
| Candidate | Raised | Spent | Cash on hand |
|---|---|---|---|
| Caleb Rudow (D) | $127,416 | $54,241 | $73,174 |
Source: Federal Election Commission

=== General election ===
==== Predictions ====
| Source | Ranking | As of |
|---|---|---|
| The Cook Political Report | Solid R | November 10, 2023 |
| Inside Elections | Solid R | October 27, 2023 |
| Sabato's Crystal Ball | Safe R | October 26, 2023 |
| Elections Daily | Likely R | October 26, 2023 |
| CNalysis | Solid R | November 16, 2023 |
| Decision Desk HQ | Safe R | June 1, 2024 |

==== Results ====
2024 North Carolina's 11th congressional district election
| Party | Candidate | Votes | % |
|---|---|---|---|
| Republican | Chuck Edwards (incumbent) | 245,546 | 56.8 |
| Democratic | Caleb Rudow | 186,977 | 43.2 |
| Total votes | | 432,523 | 100.0 |
| Republican hold | | | |

== District 12 ==
2024 North Carolina's 12th congressional district election
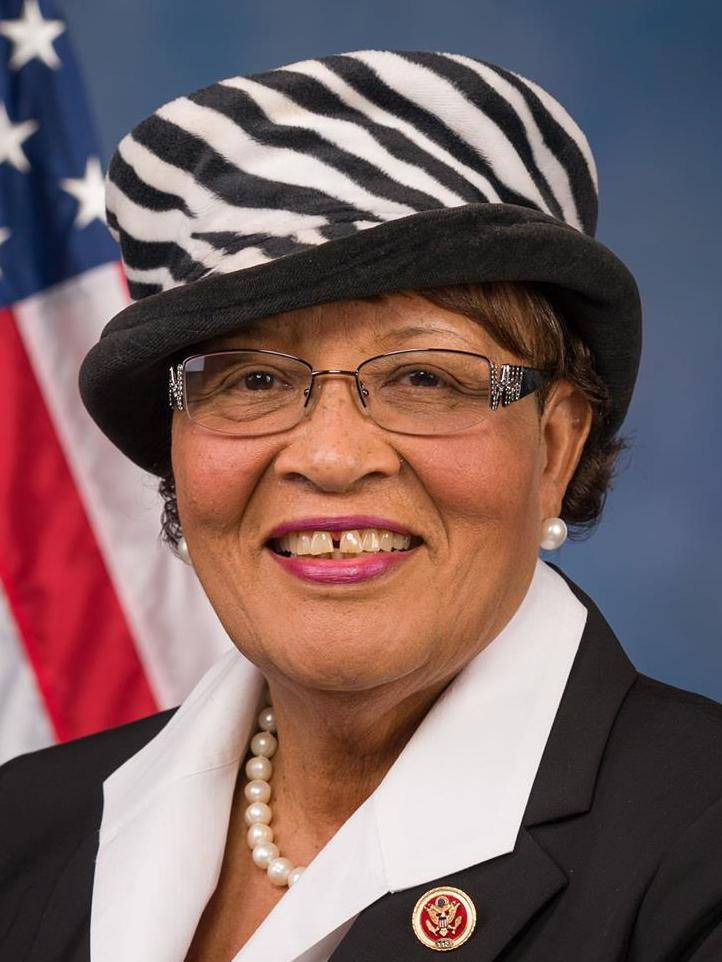

| Nominee | Alma Adams | Addul Ali |
| Party | Democratic | Republican |
| Popular vote | 259,627 | 91,128 |
| Percentage | 74.0% | 26.0% |
- Precinct results Adams: 50–60% 60–70% 70–80% 80–90% >90% Ali: 50–60%
U.S. Representative before election
Alma Adams
Democratic
Elected U.S. Representative
Alma Adams
Democratic

The new 12th district includes portions of central Mecklenburg County. The incumbent was Democrat Alma Adams, who was previously elected with 62.7% of the vote in 2022.

=== Democratic primary ===
==== Nominee ====
- Alma Adams, incumbent U.S. representative

==== Endorsements ====
Alma Adams

Organizations

- Bend the Arc
- Feminist Majority PAC
- Humane Society Legislative Fund
- National Organization for Women PAC
- National Women's Political Caucus
- Progressive Democrats of America

==== Fundraising ====
Campaign finance reports as of February 14, 2024
| Candidate | Raised | Spent | Cash on hand |
|---|---|---|---|
| Alma Adams (D) | $363,441 | $392,738 | $514,146 |
Source: Federal Election Commission

=== Republican primary ===
==== Nominee ====
- Addul Ali, former chair of the Cabarrus County Republican Party

==== Fundraising ====
Campaign finance reports as of February 14, 2024
| Candidate | Raised | Spent | Cash on hand |
|---|---|---|---|
| Addul Ali (R) | $10,740 | $9,212 | $1,527 |
Source: Federal Election Commission

=== General election ===
==== Predictions ====
| Source | Ranking | As of |
|---|---|---|
| The Cook Political Report | Solid D | November 10, 2023 |
| Inside Elections | Solid D | October 27, 2023 |
| Sabato's Crystal Ball | Solid D | October 26, 2023 |
| Elections Daily | Solid D | October 26, 2023 |
| CNalysis | Solid D | November 16, 2023 |
| Decision Desk HQ | Safe D | June 1, 2024 |

==== Results ====
2024 North Carolina's 12th congressional district election
| Party | Candidate | Votes | % |
|---|---|---|---|
| Democratic | Alma Adams (incumbent) | 259,627 | 74.0 |
| Republican | Addul Ali | 91,128 | 26.0 |
| Total votes | | 350,755 | 100.0 |
| Democratic hold | | | |

== District 13 ==
2024 North Carolina's 13th congressional district election
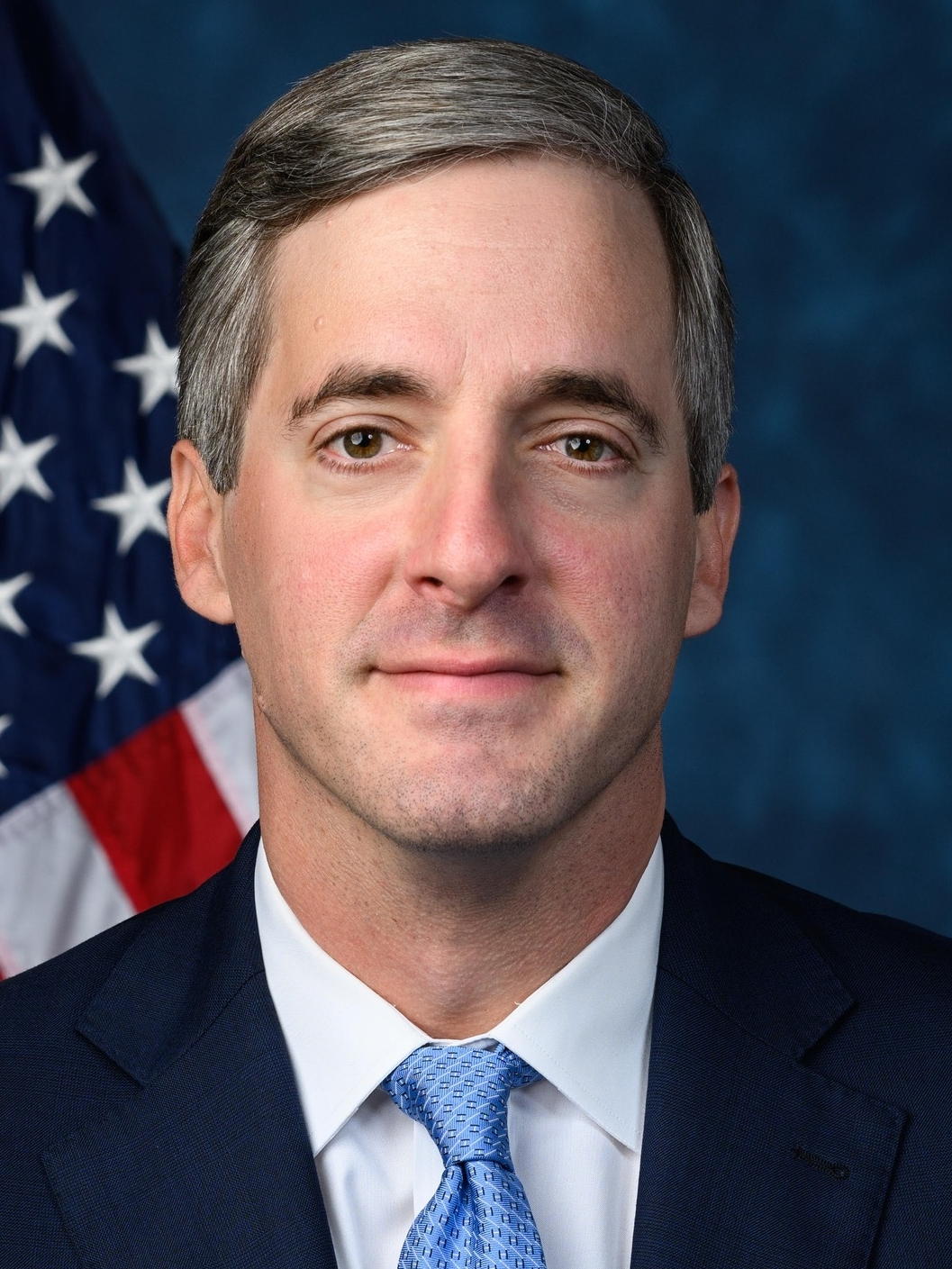

| Nominee | Brad Knott | Frank Pierce |
| Party | Republican | Democratic |
| Popular vote | 243,655 | 171,835 |
| Percentage | 58.6% | 41.4% |
- Knott: 50–60% 60–70%
U.S. Representative before election
Wiley Nickel
Democratic
Elected U.S. Representative
Brad Knott
Republican

The new 13th district includes all of Caswell, Franklin, Harnett, Johnston, Lee, and Person counties, as well as most of Granville County and portions of Wake County. The incumbent was Democrat Wiley Nickel, who was first elected with 51.6% of the vote in 2022. On December 14, 2023, Nickel announced he would retire after one term in office.

=== Democratic primary ===
==== Nominee ====
- Frank Pierce, teacher and landscape contractor

==== Declined ====
- Wiley Nickel, incumbent U.S. representative

==== Fundraising ====
Campaign finance reports as of February 14, 2024
| Candidate | Raised | Spent | Cash on hand |
|---|---|---|---|
| Frank Pierce (D) | $500 (Note: $360 of this total was self-funded by Pierce) | $237 | $262 |
Source: Federal Election Commission

==== Endorsements ====
Wiley Nickel (declined)

Organizations

- NARAL Pro-Choice America
- Planned Parenthood Action Fund

=== Republican primary ===
==== Nominee ====
- Brad Knott, attorney and son of former University of North Carolina Board of Governors member Joseph Thomas Knott

==== Advanced to runoff but withdrew ====
- Kelly Daughtry, attorney, daughter of former state representative N. Leo Daughtry, and candidate for this district in 2022 (endorsed Knott, remained on ballot)

==== Eliminated in primary ====
- Chris Baker, truck driver
- DeVan Barbour, benefits consultant, former Johnston Community College trustee, and candidate for this district in 2022
- Marcus Dellinger, sales management consultant
- David Dixon, former director of global partnerships in the North Carolina State University Office of Global Engagement
- Josh McConkey, emergency physician
- James Phillips, realtor
- Siddhanth Sharma, accountant
- Matt Shoemaker, former DIA military intelligence analyst
- Eric Stevenson, U.S. Navy veteran
- Fred Von Canon, software training business owner (previously ran in the 1st district)
- Steve Von Loor, translator, nominee for the 4th district in 2018 and candidate in 2020
- Kenny Xu, author (previously ran in the 2nd district)

==== Withdrawn ====
- Erin Paré, state representative from the 37th district (2021–present) (ran for re-election)

==== Endorsements ====
Fred Von Canon

Organizations

- House Freedom Fund
Brad Knott

U.S. executive branch officials

- Donald Trump, 45th president of the United States

U.S. senators

- Ted Budd, U.S. senator from North Carolina
Matt Shoemaker

Newspapers

- The News & Observer (Republican primary only)

=== Fundraising ===
Campaign finance reports as of February 14, 2024
| Candidate | Raised | Spent | Cash on hand |
|---|---|---|---|
| DeVan Barbour (R) | $197,286 (Note: $20,000 of this total was self-funded by Barbour) | $11,239 | $90,328 |
| Kelly Daughtry (R) | $2,146,546 (Note: $2,050,000 of this total was self-funded by Daughtry) | $1,158,761 | $987,784 |
| David Dixon (R) | $13,000 (Note: $10,000 of this total was self-funded by Daughtry) | $6,461 | $6,538 |
| Brad Knott (R) | $736,110 (Note: $250,000 of this total was self-funded by Knott) | $670,611 | $65,498 |
| Josh McConkey (R) | $484,952 (Note: $250,000 of this total was self-funded by McConkey) | $416,264 | $68,700 |
| Matt Shoemaker (R) | $109,012 (Note: $67,870 of this total was self-funded by Shoemaker) | $104,408 | $4,603 |
| Fred Von Canon (R) | $1,996,205 (Note: $1,890,000 of this total was self-funded by Von Canon) | $1,955,638 | $40,566 |
| Kenny Xu (R) | $160,463 | $131,077 | $29,386 |
Source: Federal Election Commission

==== Results ====
Primary results by county: Knott: 20–30%; Daughtry: 30–40%; Canon: 20–30%

Republican primary results
| Party | Candidate | Votes | % |
|---|---|---|---|
| Republican | Kelly Daughtry | 22,978 | 27.4 |
| Republican | Brad Knott | 15,664 | 18.7 |
| Republican | Fred Von Canon | 14,344 | 17.1 |
| Republican | DeVan Barbour | 12,892 | 15.4 |
| Republican | Josh McConkey | 5,926 | 7.1 |
| Republican | Kenny Xu | 3,604 | 4.3 |
| Republican | David Dixon | 2,146 | 2.6 |
| Republican | Matt Shoemaker | 2,003 | 2.4 |
| Republican | Chris Baker | 1,089 | 1.3 |
| Republican | Eric Stevenson | 844 | 1.0 |
| Republican | Marcus Dellinger | 798 | 1.0 |
| Republican | Siddhanth Sharma | 614 | 0.7 |
| Republican | James Phillips | 565 | 0.7 |
| Republican | Steve Von Loor | 427 | 0.5 |
| Total votes | | 83,894 | 100.0 |

==== Runoff ====
===== Polling =====
| Poll source | Date(s) administered | Sample size | Margin of error | Kelly Daughtry | Brad Knott | Undecided |
|---|---|---|---|---|---|---|
| Differentiators (Note: Poll sponsored by the American Foundations Committee Pac) | May 4–6, 2024 | 400 (LV) | ± 4.9% | 17% | 74% | 9% |
| McLaughlin & Associates (Note: Poll sponsored by Knott's campaign) | April 25–28, 2024 | 350 (LV) | – | 23% | 62% | 16% |
| Fabrizio, Lee & Associates (Note: Poll sponsored by Daughtry's campaign) | April 2–3, 2024 | 400 (LV) | ± 4.9% | 51% | 32% | 17% |
| McLaughlin & Associates | March 17–20, 2024 | 350 (LV) | – | 35% | 42% | 22% |
| Fabrizio, Lee & Associates | March 1–13, 2024 | 400 (LV) | ± 4.9% | 41% | 37% | 21% |

===== Results =====
Runoff results by county: Knott: 80–90%; >90%

Republican primary runoff results
| Party | Candidate | Votes | % |
|---|---|---|---|
| Republican | Brad Knott | 19,632 | 90.8 |
| Republican | Kelly Daughtry (withdrawn) | 1,998 | 9.2 |
| Total votes | | 21,630 | 100.0 |

=== General election ===
==== Predictions ====
| Source | Ranking | As of |
|---|---|---|
| The Cook Political Report | Solid R (flip) | November 10, 2023 |
| Inside Elections | Likely R (flip) | October 27, 2023 |
| Sabato's Crystal Ball | Safe R (flip) | October 26, 2023 |
| Elections Daily | Safe R (flip) | October 26, 2023 |
| CNalysis | Solid R (flip) | November 16, 2023 |
| Decision Desk HQ | Safe R (flip) | June 1, 2024 |

==== Results ====
2024 North Carolina's 13th congressional district election
| Party | Candidate | Votes | % |
|---|---|---|---|
| Republican | Brad Knott | 243,655 | 58.6 |
| Democratic | Frank Pierce | 171,835 | 41.4 |
| Total votes | | 415,490 | 100.0 |
| Republican gain from Democratic | | | |

== District 14 ==
2024 North Carolina's 14th congressional district election
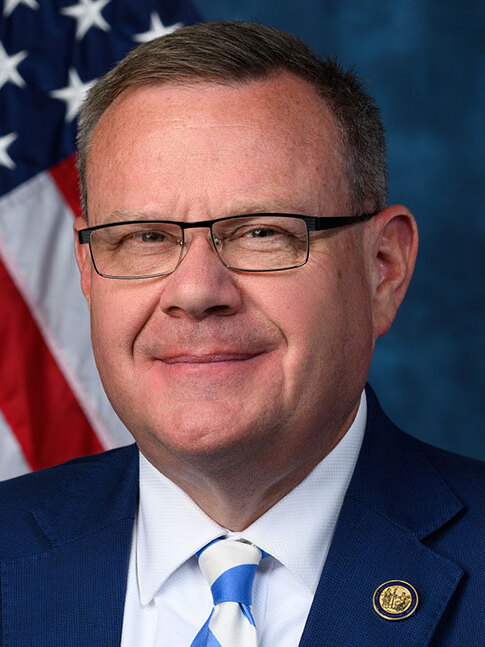

| Nominee | Tim Moore | Pam Genant |
| Party | Republican | Democratic |
| Popular vote | 232,987 | 168,269 |
| Percentage | 58.1% | 41.9% |
- Moore: 50–60% 60–70% 70–80% 80–90% Genant: 50–60% 60–70% 70–80% 80–90%
U.S. Representative before election
Jeff Jackson
Democratic
Elected U.S. Representative
Tim Moore
Republican

The new 14th district includes all of Burke, Cleveland, Gaston, and Rutherford counties, as well as portions of Mecklenburg and Polk counties. The incumbent was Democrat Jeff Jackson, who was first elected with 57.7% of the vote in 2022. On October 26, 2023, Jackson announced he would retire after one term, instead running for Attorney General.

=== Democratic primary ===
==== Nominee ====
- Pam Genant, former chair of the Burke County Democratic Party and nominee for the 10th district in 2022

==== Eliminated in primary ====
- Brendan Maginnis, financial executive and candidate for U.S. Senate in 2022

==== Declined ====
- Jeff Jackson, incumbent U.S. representative (ran for attorney general)

==== Endorsements ====
Pam Genant

Organizations

- National Women's Political Caucus
Brendan Maginnis

Newspapers

- The Charlotte Observer

=== Fundraising ===
Campaign finance reports as of February 14, 2024
| Candidate | Raised | Spent | Cash on hand |
|---|---|---|---|
| Pam Genan (D) | $8,885 (Note: $600 of this total was self-funded by Genan) | $7,448 | $1,436 |
| Brendan Maginnis (D) | $38,660 (Note: $36,985 of this total was self-funded by Maginnis) | $20,489 | $18,170 |
Source: Federal Election Commission

==== Results ====
Democratic primary results
| Party | Candidate | Votes | % |
|---|---|---|---|
| Democratic | Pam Genant | 20,389 | 60.8 |
| Democratic | Brendan Maginnis | 13,121 | 39.2 |
| Total votes | | 33,510 | 100.0 |

=== Republican primary ===
==== Nominee ====
- Tim Moore, Speaker of the North Carolina House of Representatives (2015–2025) from the 111th district (2003–2025)

==== Eliminated in primary ====
- Jeff Gregory, retired postmaster and perennial candidate
- Lillian Joseph, guardian ad litem and candidate for the 12th district in 2022

==== Withdrawn ====
- Pat Harrigan, firearms manufacturer and nominee for this district in 2022 (running in the 10th district)

==== Endorsements ====
Tim Moore

Executive branch officials

- Donald Trump, 45th president of the United States

Organizations

- AIPAC
- GOPAC
- National Rifle Association Political Victory Fund
- Susan B. Anthony Pro-Life America

Newspapers

- The Charlotte Observer

=== Fundraising ===
Campaign finance reports as of February 14, 2024
| Candidate | Raised | Spent | Cash on hand |
|---|---|---|---|
| Tim Moore (R) | $1,558,569 | $673,345 | $885,224 |
Source: Federal Election Commission

==== Polling ====
| Poll source | Date(s) administered | Sample size | Margin of error | Jeff Gregory | Lillian Joseph | Tim Moore | Undecided |
|---|---|---|---|---|---|---|---|
| Differentiators Data (Note: Poll sponsored by GOPAC, which supports Moore) | December 17–19, 2023 | 400 (LV) | ± 4.9% | 6% | 2% | 49% | 43% |

==== Results ====
Primary results by county: Moore: 60–70%; 70–80%; 80–90%

Republican primary results
| Party | Candidate | Votes | % |
|---|---|---|---|
| Republican | Tim Moore | 55,644 | 75.0 |
| Republican | Jeff Gregory | 9,562 | 12.9 |
| Republican | Lillian Joseph | 8,996 | 12.1 |
| Total votes | | 74,202 | 100.0 |

=== General election ===
==== Predictions ====
| Source | Ranking | As of |
|---|---|---|
| The Cook Political Report | Solid R (flip) | November 10, 2023 |
| Inside Elections | Likely R (flip) | October 27, 2023 |
| Sabato's Crystal Ball | Safe R (flip) | October 26, 2023 |
| Elections Daily | Safe R (flip) | October 26, 2023 |
| CNalysis | Solid R (flip) | November 16, 2023 |
| Decision Desk HQ | Safe R (flip) | June 1, 2024 |

==== Results ====
2024 North Carolina's 14th congressional district election
| Party | Candidate | Votes | % |
|---|---|---|---|
| Republican | Tim Moore | 232,987 | 58.1 |
| Democratic | Pam Genant | 168,269 | 41.9 |
| Total votes | | 401,256 | 100.0 |
| Republican gain from Democratic | | | |

== See also ==
- 2024 North Carolina elections

== Notes ==
Partisan clients
