= Todd Carver =

American politician

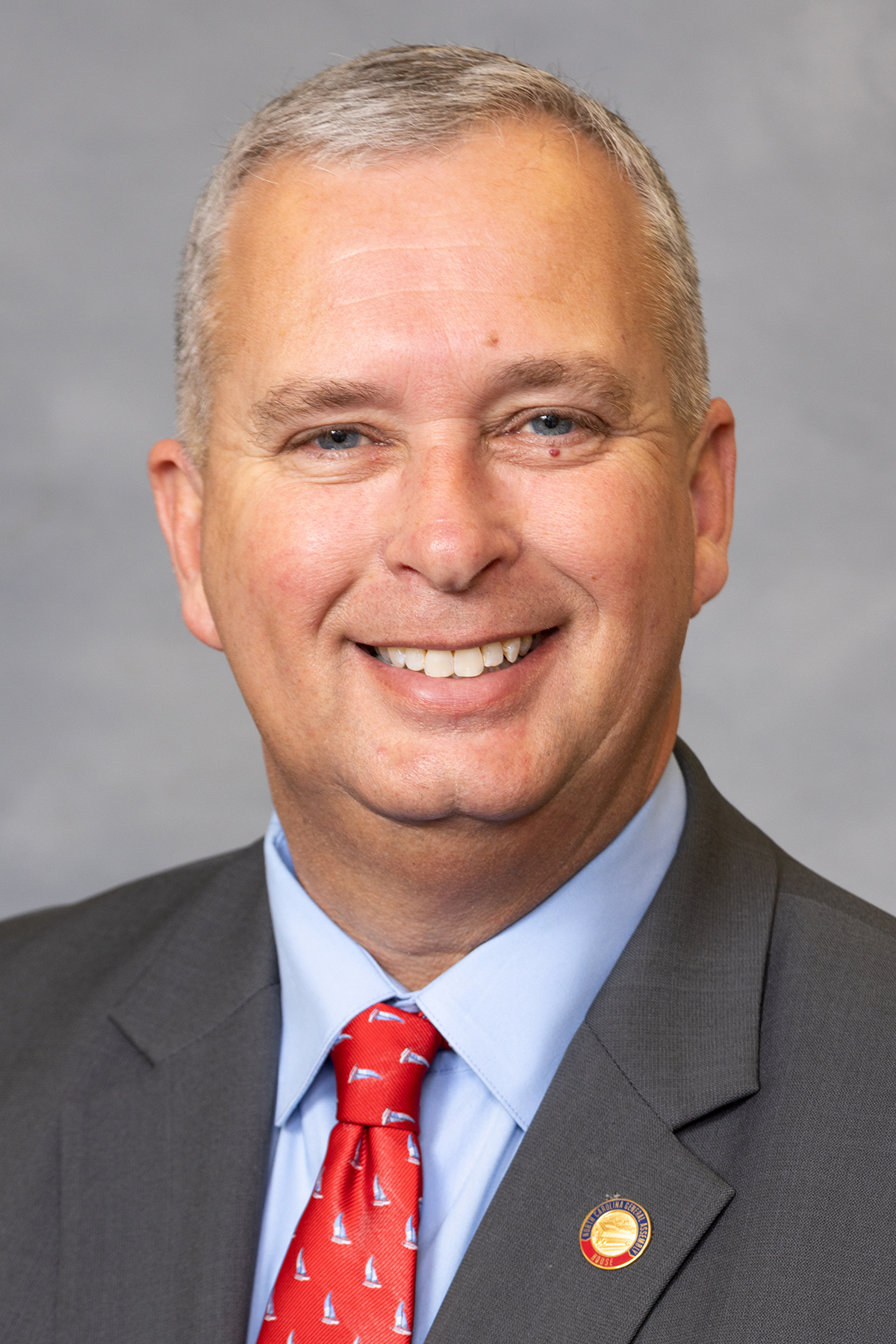

Member of the North Carolina House of Representatives from the 95th district
- Incumbent
- Assumed office January 1, 2025
- Preceded by: Grey Mills

Personal details
- Party: Republican

Todd Carver is a Republican member of the North Carolina House of Representatives. He has represented the 95th district since 2025.
