= John A. Fraley =

American politician (born c.1951)

Representative John Fraley
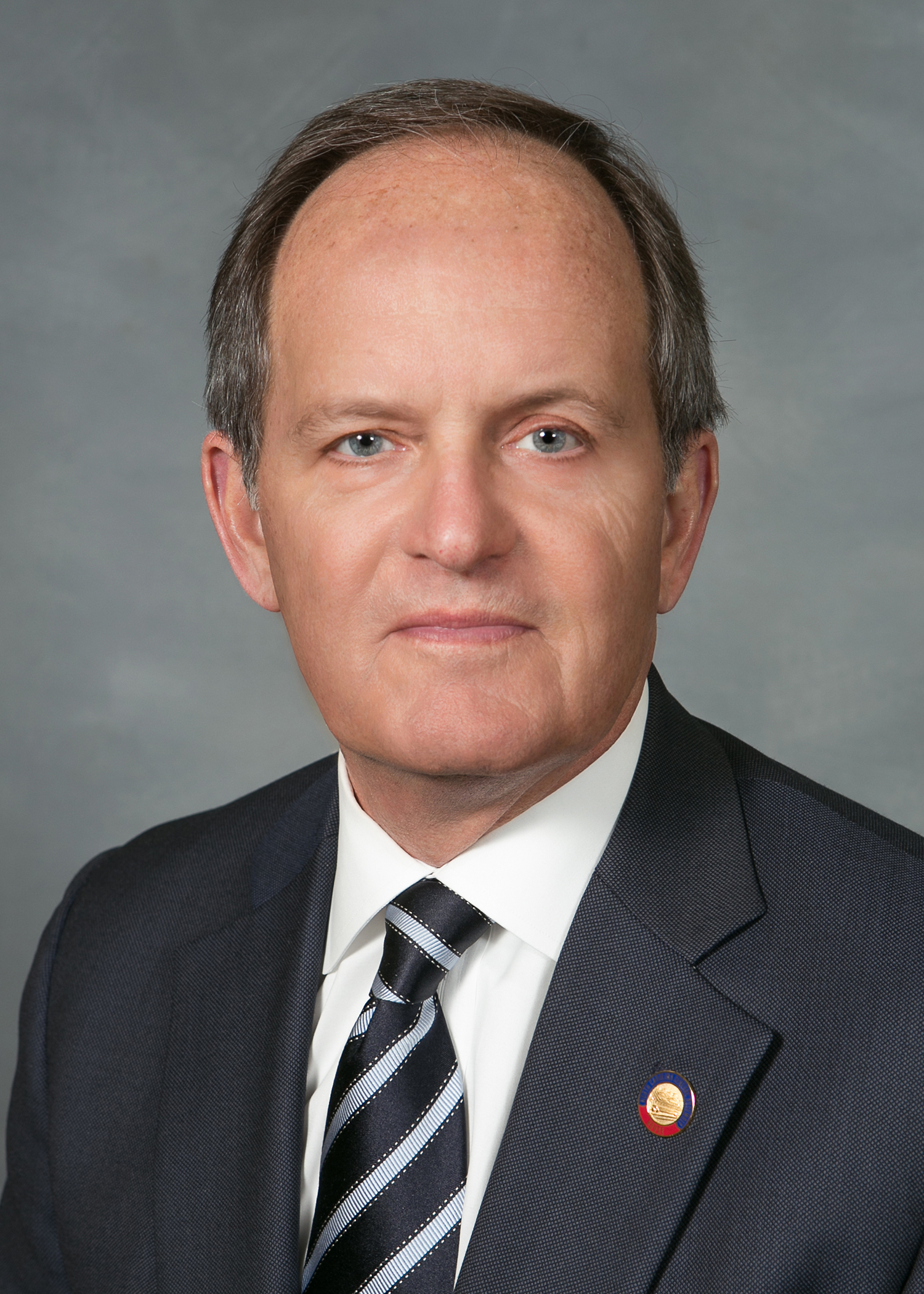

Member of the North Carolina House of Representatives from the 95th district
- In office January 1, 2015 – January 1, 2021
- Preceded by: Robert Brawley
- Succeeded by: Grey Mills

Personal details
- Born: John A. Fraley; 1950 or 1951 (age 75–76) Statesville, North Carolina
- Party: Republican
- Spouse: Adelaide Horton (m. 1979)
- Education: University of North Carolina at Chapel Hill

John A. Fraley (born c. 1951) is a former Republican member of the North Carolina House of Representatives. A business owner from Mooresville, North Carolina, he represented the 95th district (including constituents in Iredell County) from 2015 until 2021. Following his retirement from the House in 2021, Fraley was appointed to the University of North Carolina Board of Governors for a term ending in 2025.

== Committee assignments ==
=== 2019-2020 session ===
- Appropriations (Vice Chair)
- Appropriations - Education (Chair)
- Education - Universities (Chair)
- Education - K-12
- Rules, Calendar, and Operations of the House
- Transportation
- Health

=== 2017-2018 session ===
- Appropriations (Vice Chair)
- Appropriations - Education (Chair)
- Education - Universities (Chair)
- University Board of Governors Nominating (Chair)
- Rules, Calendar, and Operations of the House
- Transportation
- Banking
- Commerce and Job Development

=== 2015-2016 session ===
- Appropriations
- Appropriations - Education
- Banking (Vice Chair)
- Commerce and Job Development (Vice Chair)
- Education - Universities
- Rules, Calendar, and Operations of the House
- Transportation

== Electoral history ==
=== 2018 ===
North Carolina House of Representatives 95th district general election, 2018
Party	Candidate	Votes	%
Republican	John Fraley (incumbent)	22,593	64.07%
Democratic	Carla Fassbender	12,670	35.93%
Total votes		35,263	100%
Republican hold			

=== 2016 ===
North Carolina House of Representatives 95th district Republican primary election, 2016
Party	Candidate	Votes	%
Republican	John Fraley (incumbent)	8,160	68.51%
Republican	David W. Thompson	3,751	31.49%
Total votes		11,911	100%

North Carolina House of Representatives 95th district general election, 2016
Party	Candidate	Votes	%
Republican	John Fraley (incumbent)	33,298	100%
Total votes		33,298	100%
Republican hold			

=== 2014 ===
North Carolina House of Representatives 95th district Republican primary election, 2014
Party	Candidate	Votes	%
Republican	John Fraley	2,881	50.94%
Republican	Robert Brawley (incumbent)	2,775	49.06%
Total votes		5,656	100%

North Carolina House of Representatives 95th district general election, 2014
Party	Candidate	Votes	%
Republican	John Fraley	18,451	100%
Total votes		18,451	100%
Republican hold			

North Carolina House of Representatives
Preceded by Robert Brawley	Member of the North Carolina House of Representatives from the 95th district 2015–2021	Succeeded by Grey Mills
