= North Carolina's 95th House district =

American legislative district

North Carolina's 95th State House of Representatives district
Representative
Todd Carver; R–Mooresville
- Demographics: 76% White; 8% Black; 7% Hispanic; 4% Asian; 1% Other; 4% Multiracial
- Population (2024): 89,031

North Carolina's 95th House district is one of 120 districts in the North Carolina House of Representatives. It has been represented by Republican Todd Carver since 2025.

== Geography ==
Since 2005, the district has included part of Iredell County. The district overlaps with the 37th Senate district.

== District officeholders ==
Representative	Party	Dates	Notes	Counties
District created January 1, 1993.				1993–2003; Part of Johnston County
Leo Daughtry (Smithfield)	Republican	January 1, 1993 – January 1, 2003	Redistricted to the 28th district.	1993–2003; Part of Johnston County
Karen Ray (Mooresville)	Republican	January 1, 2003 – January 1, 2009	Lost re-nomination.	2003–2005; Parts of Iredell and Catawba counties.
Karen Ray (Mooresville)	Republican	January 1, 2003 – January 1, 2009	Lost re-nomination.	2005–Present; Part of Iredell County.
Grey Mills (Mooresville)	Republican	January 1, 2009 – January 1, 2013	Retired to run for Lieutenant Governor.	2005–Present; Part of Iredell County.
Robert Brawley (Mooresville)	Republican	January 1, 2013 – January 1, 2015	Lost re-nomination.	2005–Present; Part of Iredell County.
John Fraley (Mooresville)	Republican	January 1, 2015 – January 1, 2021	Retired.	2005–Present; Part of Iredell County.
Grey Mills (Mooresville)	Republican	January 1, 2021 – January 1, 2025	Retired to run for Congress.	2005–Present; Part of Iredell County.
Todd Carver (Mooresville)	Republican	January 1, 2025 – Present		2005–Present; Part of Iredell County.

== Election results ==
=== 2026 ===
North Carolina House of Representatives 95th district Republican primary election, 2026
Party	Candidate	Votes	%
Republican	Todd Carver (incumbent)	3,181	59.49%
Republican	Mike Kubiniec	2,166	40.51%
Total votes		5,347	100%

North Carolina House of Representatives 95th district general election, 2026
Party	Candidate	Votes	%
Republican	Todd Carver (incumbent)		
Democratic	Michael Robinson		
Total votes			100%

=== 2024 ===
North Carolina House of Representatives 95th district general election, 2024
Party	Candidate	Votes	%
Republican	Todd Carver	32,402	64.47%
Democratic	Mike Robinson	17,855	35.53%
Total votes		50,257	100%
Republican hold			

=== 2022 ===
North Carolina House of Representatives 95th district general election, 2022
Party	Candidate	Votes	%
Republican	Grey Mills (incumbent)	22,524	67.48%
Democratic	Amanda B. Kotis	10,854	32.52%
Total votes		33,378	100%
Republican hold			

=== 2020 ===
North Carolina House of Representatives 95th district general election, 2020
Party	Candidate	Votes	%
Republican	Grey Mills	36,557	65.69%
Democratic	Amanda Brown Kotis	19,098	34.31%
Total votes		55,655	100%
Republican hold			

=== 2018 ===
North Carolina House of Representatives 95th district general election, 2018
Party	Candidate	Votes	%
Republican	John Fraley (incumbent)	22,593	64.07%
Democratic	Carla Fassbender	12,670	35.93%
Total votes		35,263	100%
Republican hold			

=== 2016 ===
North Carolina House of Representatives 95th district Republican primary election, 2016
Party	Candidate	Votes	%
Republican	John Fraley (incumbent)	8,160	68.51%
Republican	David W. Thompson	3,751	31.49%
Total votes		11,911	100%

North Carolina House of Representatives 95th district general election, 2016
Party	Candidate	Votes	%
Republican	John Fraley (incumbent)	33,298	100%
Total votes		33,298	100%
Republican hold			

=== 2014 ===
North Carolina House of Representatives 95th district Republican primary election, 2014
Party	Candidate	Votes	%
Republican	John Fraley	2,881	50.94%
Republican	Robert Brawley (incumbent)	2,775	49.06%
Total votes		5,656	100%

North Carolina House of Representatives 95th district general election, 2014
Party	Candidate	Votes	%
Republican	John Fraley	18,451	100%
Total votes		18,451	100%
Republican hold			

=== 2012 ===
North Carolina House of Representatives 95th district Republican primary election, 2012
Party	Candidate	Votes	%
Republican	Robert Brawley	4,947	57.59%
Republican	Charlton L. Allen	3,001	34.94%
Republican	Marc Fasano	642	7.47%
Total votes		8,590	100%

North Carolina House of Representatives 95th district general election, 2012
Party	Candidate	Votes	%
Republican	Robert Brawley	27,856	94.84%
Independent	Barbara Orr (write-in)	1,310	4.46%
Write-in		207	0.70%
Total votes		29,373	100%
Republican hold			

=== 2010 ===
North Carolina House of Representatives 95th district general election, 2010
Party	Candidate	Votes	%
Republican	Grey Mills (incumbent)	18,675	100%
Total votes		18,675	100%
Republican hold			

=== 2008 ===
North Carolina House of Representatives 95th district Republican primary election, 2008
Party	Candidate	Votes	%
Republican	Grey Mills	3,626	50.83%
Republican	Karen Ray (incumbent)	3,507	49.17%
Total votes		7,133	100%

North Carolina House of Representatives 95th district general election, 2008
Party	Candidate	Votes	%
Republican	Grey Mills	27,895	82.43%
Libertarian	Jeffrey Ober	5,304	15.67%
Write-in		643	1.90%
Total votes		33,842	100%
Republican hold			

=== 2006 ===
North Carolina House of Representatives 95th district Republican primary election, 2006
Party	Candidate	Votes	%
Republican	Karen Ray (incumbent)	1,528	52.33%
Republican	Robert Brawley	1,392	47.67%
Total votes		2,920	100%

North Carolina House of Representatives 95th district general election, 2006
Party	Candidate	Votes	%
Republican	Karen Ray (Incumbent)	11,269	100%
Total votes		11,269	100%
Republican hold			

=== 2004 ===
North Carolina House of Representatives 95th district general election, 2004
Party	Candidate	Votes	%
Republican	Karen Ray (Incumbent)	24,199	100%
Total votes		24,199	100%
Republican hold			

=== 2002 ===
North Carolina House of Representatives 95th district Republican primary election, 2002
Party	Candidate	Votes	%
Republican	Karen Ray	2,547	56.41%
Republican	Robert Brawley	1,968	43.59%
Total votes		4,515	100%

North Carolina House of Representatives 95th district general election, 2002
Party	Candidate	Votes	%
Republican	Karen Ray	14,613	100%
Total votes		14,613	100%
Republican win (new seat)			

=== 2000 ===
North Carolina House of Representatives 95th district Democratic primary election, 2000
Party	Candidate	Votes	%
Democratic	Jim Johnson	3,755	73.46%
Democratic	Gerald Waters	1,357	26.55%
Total votes		5,112	100%

North Carolina House of Representatives 95th district general election, 2000
Party	Candidate	Votes	%
Republican	Leo Daughtry (incumbent)	15,511	60.87%
Democratic	Jim Johnson	9,972	39.13%
Total votes		25,483	100%
Republican hold			
