= Karen B. Ray =

American politician

Karen B. Ray is a former Republican member of the North Carolina General Assembly who represented the state's ninety-fifth House district, including constituents in Catawba and Iredell counties. Ray was a court reporter from Mooresville, North Carolina, and Iredell County commissioner, prior to her election to the assembly. After winning the Republican primary, she was unopposed in the 2002 general election for her seat.

== Electoral history ==
=== 2008 ===
North Carolina House of Representatives 95th district Republican primary election, 2008
Party	Candidate	Votes	%
Republican	Grey Mills	3,626	50.83%
Republican	Karen Ray (incumbent)	3,507	49.17%
Total votes		7,133	100%

=== 2006 ===
North Carolina House of Representatives 95th district Republican primary election, 2006
Party	Candidate	Votes	%
Republican	Karen Ray (incumbent)	1,528	52.33%
Republican	Robert Brawley	1,392	47.67%
Total votes		2,920	100%

North Carolina House of Representatives 95th district general election, 2006
Party	Candidate	Votes	%
Republican	Karen Ray (incumbent)	11,269	100%
Total votes		11,269	100%
Republican hold			

=== 2004 ===
North Carolina House of Representatives 95th district general election, 2004
Party	Candidate	Votes	%
Republican	Karen Ray (incumbent)	24,199	100%
Total votes		24,199	100%
Republican hold			

=== 2002 ===
North Carolina House of Representatives 95th district Republican primary election, 2002
Party	Candidate	Votes	%
Republican	Karen Ray	2,547	56.41%
Republican	Robert Brawley	1,968	43.59%
Total votes		4,515	100%

North Carolina House of Representatives 95th district general election, 2002
Party	Candidate	Votes	%
Republican	Karen Ray	14,613	100%
Total votes		14,613	100%
Republican win (new seat)			

North Carolina House of Representatives
Preceded by Leo Daughtry	Member of the North Carolina House of Representatives from the 95th district 2003–2009	Succeeded by Grey Mills
