= Pat Harrigan =

American politician (born 1987)

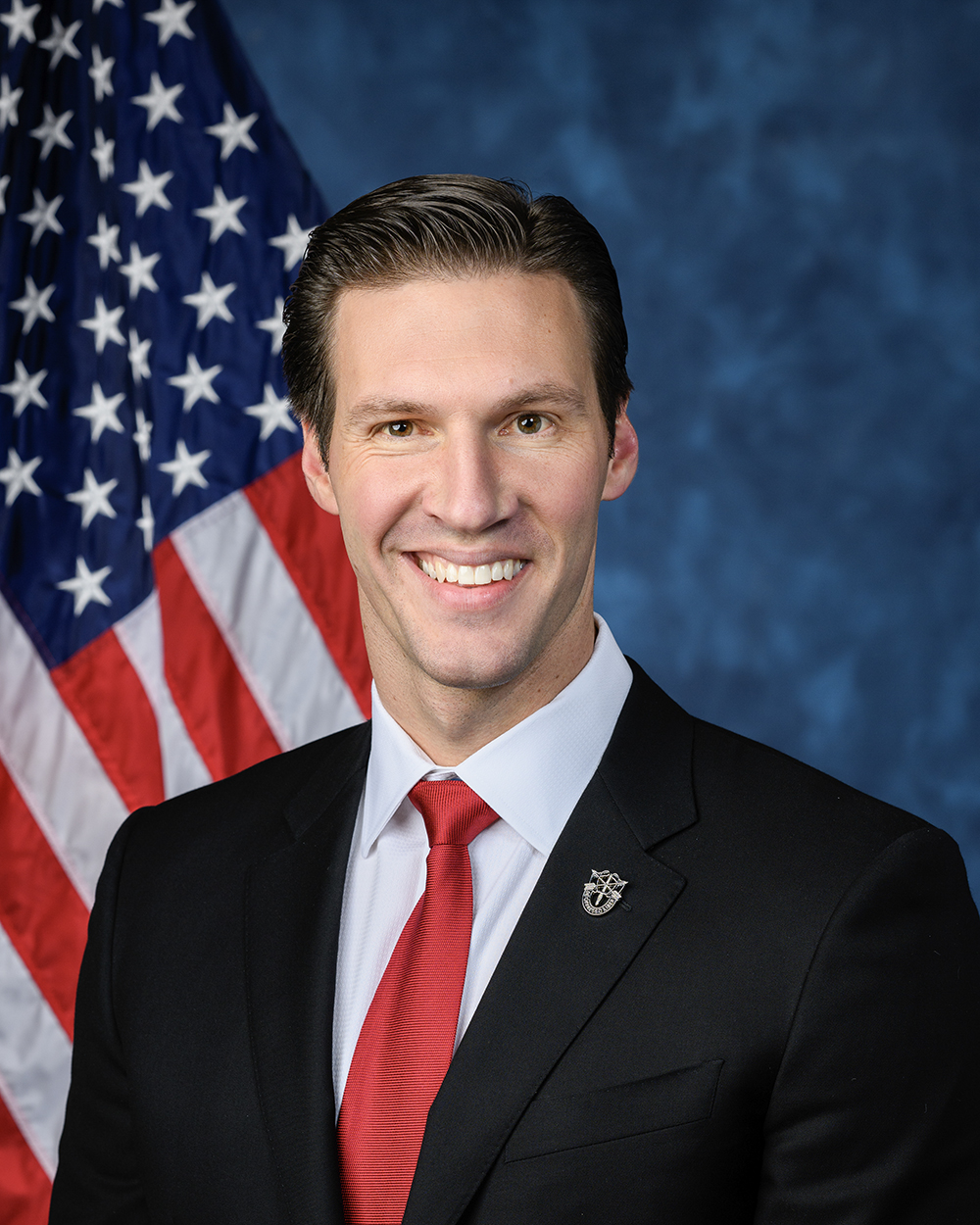
- Official portrait, 2025

Member of the U.S. House of Representatives from North Carolina's 10th district
- Incumbent
- Assumed office January 3, 2025
- Preceded by: Patrick McHenry

Personal details
- Born: Patrick Luke Harrigan; June 21, 1987 (age 38) San Diego County, California, U.S.
- Party: Republican
- Spouse: Raquel Krivda (m. 2010)
- Children: 2
- Education: United States Military Academy (BS)
- Website: House website Campaign website

Military service
- Branch/service: United States Army
- Rank: Captain
- Unit: 25th Infantry Division; 3rd Special Forces Group
- Battles/wars: War in Afghanistan; Operation Enduring Freedom
- Awards: Bronze Star Medal (2)

Patrick Luke Harrigan (born June 21, 1987) is an American politician, engineer, and former Army Special Forces officer serving as the U.S. representative for North Carolina's 10th congressional district since 2025. He is a member of the Republican Party.

== Early life and education ==
Harrigan graduated from the Francis Parker School and the United States Military Academy, where he earned a Bachelor of Science in nuclear engineering.

== Military service ==
Following graduation from West Point in 2009 and commissioning as a second lieutenant in the United States Army, Harrigan trained as an infantry officer and graduated from Ranger School before his first operational force assignment at Fort Wainwright, Alaska. While assigned to 1st Stryker Brigade Combat Team, 25th Infantry Division, (Note: As part of U.S. strategic focus in the arctic region and the reorganization of U.S. Army Alaska, Harrigan's former brigade was reflagged in June 2022 from the 25th Infantry Division to its current designation as 1st Infantry Brigade Combat Team, 11th Airborne Division.) he served as an infantry platoon leader and deployed to Afghanistan during Operation Enduring Freedom from 2011-2012.

Following that deployment, he volunteered for United States Army Special Forces selection and training and qualified as a Special Forces officer. After taking command of a Special Forces Operational Detachment - Alpha in 3rd Special Forces Group, he completed a second deployment to Afghanistan. During his military career, he was awarded two Bronze Star Medals.

Harrigan has described the 2020–2021 U.S. troop withdrawal from Afghanistan as a primary motivation to run for United States Congress.

== U.S. House of Representatives ==
=== Elections ===
==== 2022 ====
Harrigan ran for the United States House of Representatives seat in North Carolina's 14th congressional district in the 2022 elections as a Republican. He lost to Jeff Jackson, the Democratic Party nominee 58% to 42%.

==== 2024 ====
In August 2023, Harrigan announced that he would run again for a seat in the House of Representatives in the 2024 elections. He switched his candidacy to North Carolina's 10th congressional district, where Patrick McHenry announced his retirement, in December 2023. Harrigan won the nomination, narrowly defeating state Representative Grey Mills, and the general election.

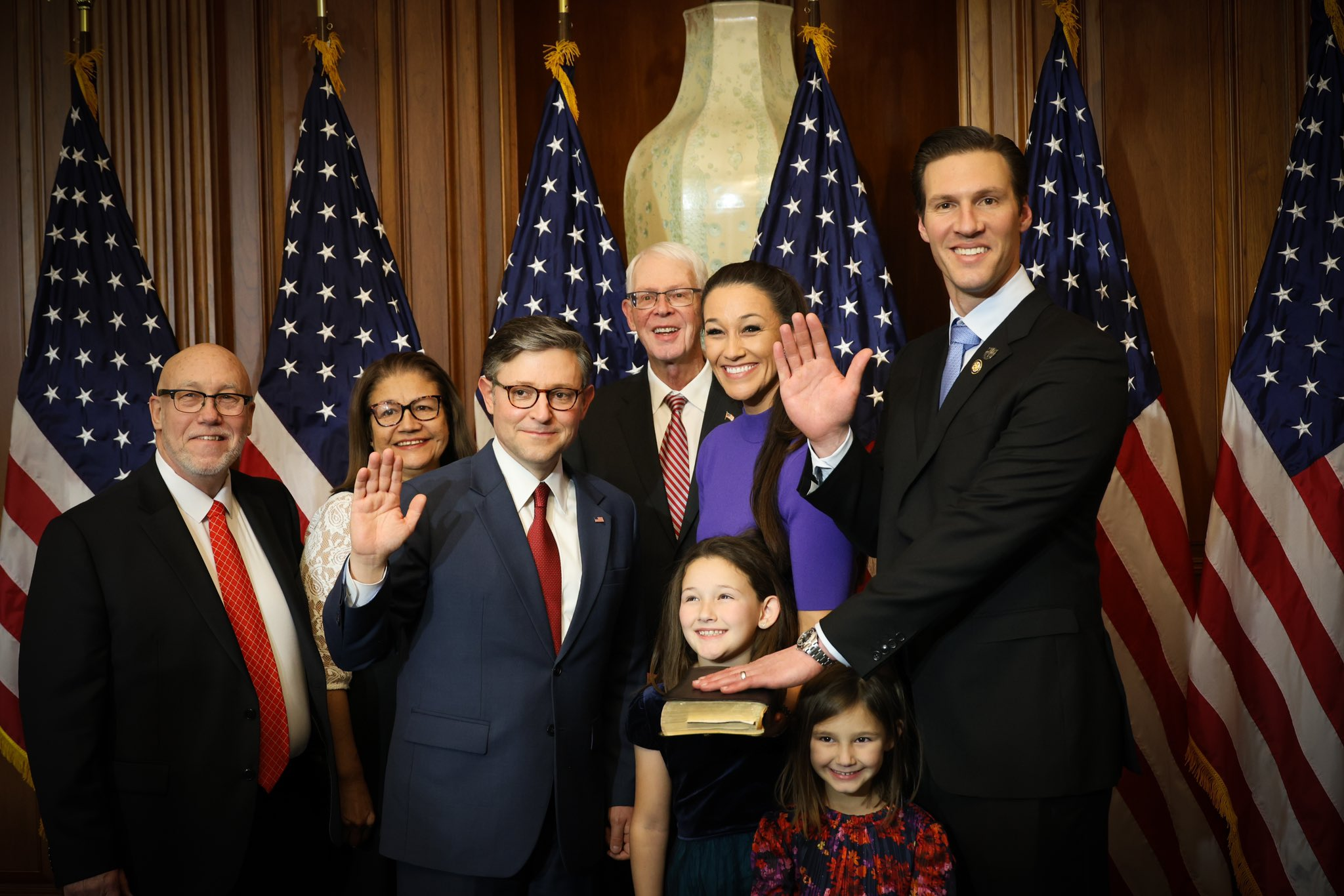
Harrigan being sworn in by Speaker Mike Johnson, 2025

=== Tenure ===
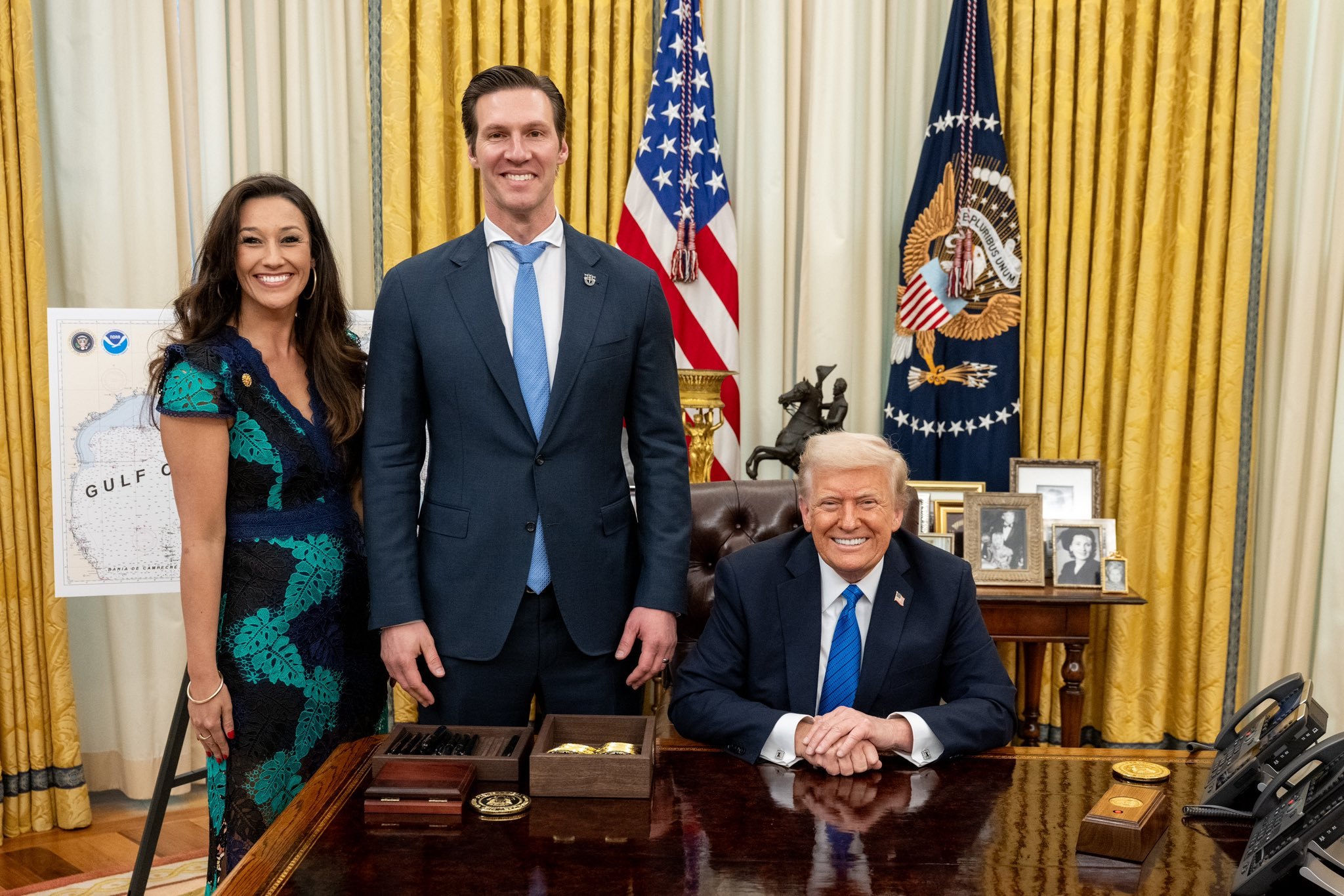
Harrigan with President Donald Trump in the Oval Office, 2025

Representative Harrigan was sworn in to the 119th Congress on January 3, 2025.

In April 2026, Harrigan said that President Donald Trump's threat to obliterate Iran's "whole civilization" was an attempt to deescalate the 2026 Iran War.

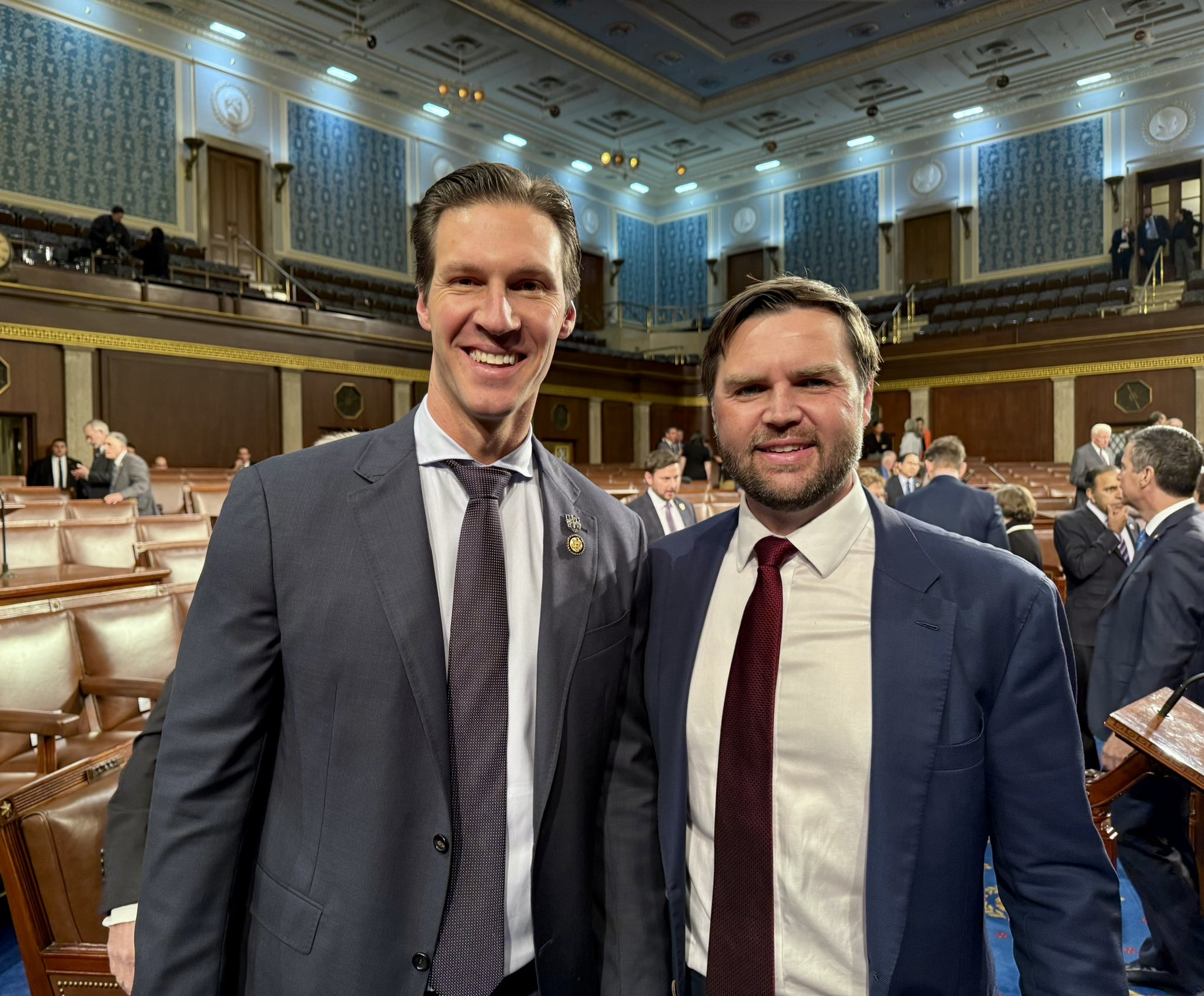
Harrigan with Vice President JD Vance

=== Committee assignments ===
- Committee on Armed Services
  - Subcommittee on Intelligence and Special Operations
  - Subcommittee on Military Personnel
  - Subcommittee on Readiness
- Committee on Science, Space, and Technology
  - Subcommittee on Energy
  - Subcommittee on Investigations and Oversight

== Personal life ==
Harrigan married Raquel "Rocky" Krivda on September 25, 2010.

== Electoral history ==
2022 North Carolina's 14th congressional district Republican primary results
Party	Candidate	Votes	%
Republican	Pat Harrigan	27,638	75.6
Republican	Jonathan Simpson	8,909	24.4
Total votes		36,547	100.0

2022 North Carolina's 14th congressional district election
Party	Candidate	Votes	%
Democratic	Jeff Jackson	148,738	57.7
Republican	Pat Harrigan	109,014	42.3
Total votes		257,752	100.0
Democratic win (new seat)			

2024 North Carolina's 10th congressional district Republican primary results
Party	Candidate	Votes	%
Republican	Pat Harrigan	36,028	41.2
Republican	Grey Mills	34,000	38.9
Republican	Brooke McGowan	8,795	10.1
Republican	Charles Eller	6,076	6.9
Republican	Diana Jimison	2,535	2.9
Total votes		87,434	100.0

2024 North Carolina's 10th congressional district election
Party	Candidate	Votes	%
Republican	Pat Harrigan	233,814	57.5
Democratic	Ralph Scott Jr.	155,383	38.2
Libertarian	Steven Feldman	11,614	2.9
Constitution	Todd Helm	5,884	1.4
Total votes		406,695	100.0
Republican hold			

== Notes ==
U.S. House of Representatives
Preceded by Patrick McHenry	Member of the U.S. House of Representatives from North Carolina's 10th congressional district 2025–present	Incumbent
U.S. order of precedence (ceremonial)
Preceded by Mike Haridopolos	United States representatives by seniority 388th	Succeeded by Mark Harris
