= International Franchise Association =

Lobbying organization based in Washington, DC

- Nickname: IFA
- Type: 501(c)(6) Non-Profit
- Tax ID no.: 36-6108621
- Headquarters: 1201 New York Avenue NW, Washington, DC 20005
- Budget: US$17.2 million
- Website: franchise.org

The International Franchise Association (IFA) is a trade group focused on government and public relations efforts for the franchise industry. The association publishes data on franchise activity through a partnership with the U.S. Census Bureau and has litigated on behalf of its members in cases that have reached the U.S. Supreme Court.

== History ==
IFA was originally founded in Chicago in 1961 by Dunkin' Donuts founder Bill Rosenberg and other business owners.

== Lobbying activities ==
IFA lobbies in local, state and federal workforce issues such as minimum wage increases, employee classifications and health care legislation. In 2015, the IFA filed suit against the city of Seattle to combat the city's planned minimum wage increase. The case proceeded to the US Supreme Court, which ruled in favor of Seattle.

== Membership ==
IFA claims a membership of 1,400 brands, and states that its members represent 2.5% of the U.S. GDP
