= Grey Mills =

American politician

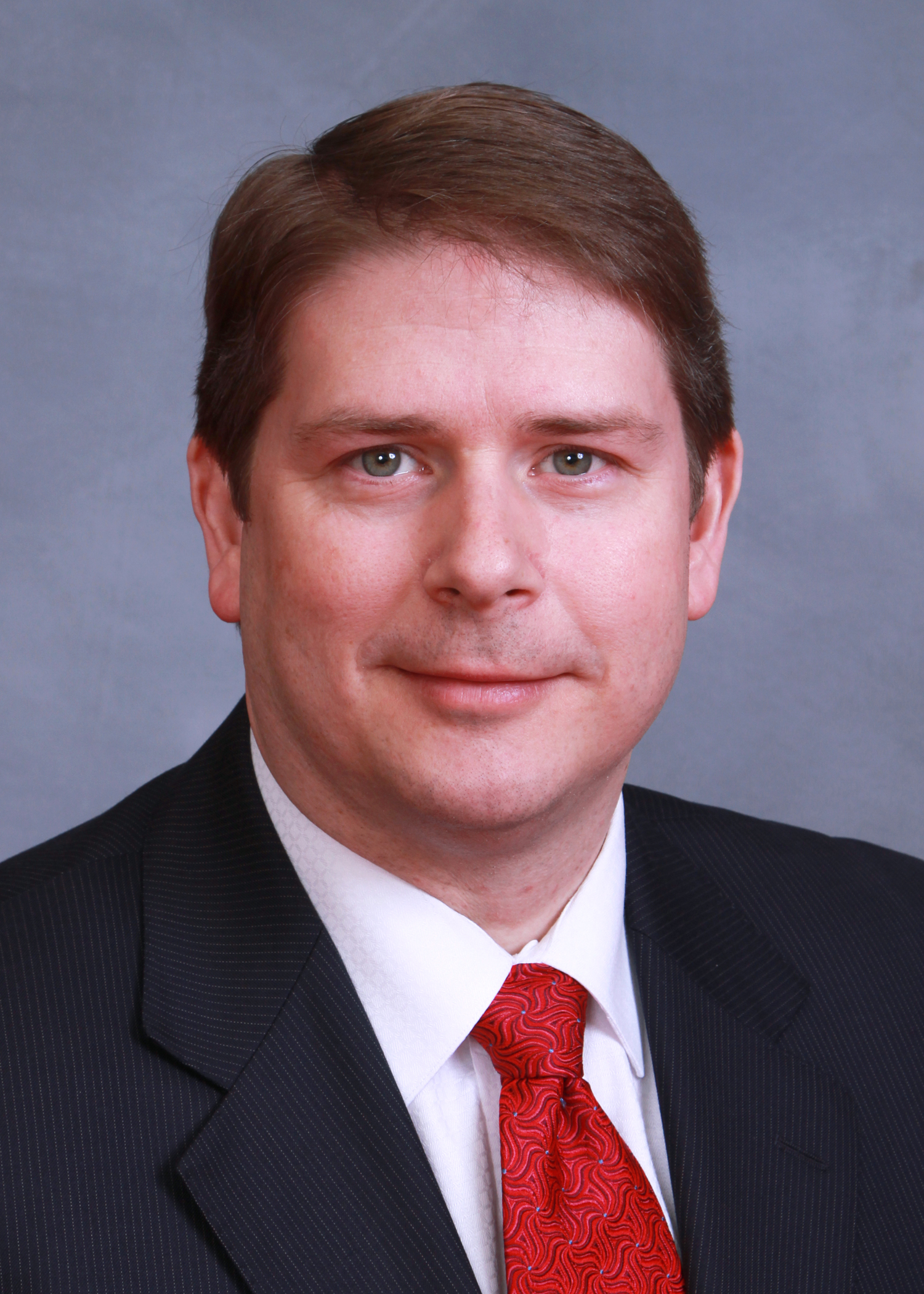

Member of the North Carolina House of Representatives from the 95th district
- In office January 1, 2021 – January 1, 2025
- Preceded by: John Fraley
- Succeeded by: Todd Carver
- In office January 1, 2009 – January 1, 2013
- Preceded by: Karen Ray
- Succeeded by: Robert Brawley

Personal details
- Born: Paul Grey Mills Jr. Iredell County, North Carolina, U.S.
- Party: Republican
- Spouse: Jennifer
- Children: 3
- Education: Appalachian State University (BS); Regent University (JD)
- Website: State House website

Paul Grey Mills Jr. is an American politician who previously served as a Republican member of the North Carolina House of Representatives representing the 95th district from 2009 to 2013 and again from 2021 to 2025. Mills defeated incumbent Karen Ray in the 2008 primary by 119 votes, and served for 2 terms in the NC House from 2009 until 2013. In 2012, Mills sought the Republican nomination for Lieutenant Governor, but he lost to eventual winner Dan Forest. Following then incumbent Republican John Fraley's decision not to seek re-election to the state house in 2020, Mills sought election to his old seat and won. Mills ran unsuccessfully for North Carolina's 10th congressional district in 2024, narrowly losing the Republican primary to eventual winner Pat Harrigan.

== Political positions ==
In May 2021, Mills voted for North Carolina House bill 453 which prohibited abortion based on race, sex, or suspected disability. In March 2021, he voted for House bill 134 which authorized possession of firearms on school grounds.

== Electoral history ==
=== 2024 ===
North Carolina's 10th congressional district Republican primary election, 2024
Party	Candidate	Votes	%
Republican	Pat Harrigan	36,028	41.21%
Republican	Grey Mills	34,000	38.89%
Republican	Brooke McGowan	8,795	10.06%
Republican	Charles Eller	6,076	6.95%
Republican	Diana Jimison	2,535	2.90%
Total votes		87,434	100%

=== 2022 ===
North Carolina House of Representatives 95th district general election, 2022
Party	Candidate	Votes	%
Republican	Grey Mills (incumbent)	22,524	67.48%
Democratic	Amanda B. Kotis	10,854	32.52%
Total votes		33,378	100%
Republican hold			

=== 2020 ===
North Carolina House of Representatives 95th district general election, 2020
Party	Candidate	Votes	%
Republican	Grey Mills	36,557	65.69%
Democratic	Amanda Brown Kotis	19,098	34.31%
Total votes		55,655	100%
Republican hold			

=== 2012 ===
North Carolina lieutenant gubernatorial Republican primary election, 2012
Party	Candidate	Votes	%
Republican	Dan Forest	251,885	32.9
Republican	Tony Gurley	189,954	24.9
Republican	Dale Folwell	185,535	24.3
Republican	Grey Mills	112,063	14.7
Republican	Arthur Jason Rich	25,015	3.3
Total votes		764,452	100.00

=== 2010 ===
North Carolina House of Representatives 95th district general election, 2010
Party	Candidate	Votes	%
Republican	Grey Mills (incumbent)	18,675	100%
Total votes		18,675	100%
Republican hold			

=== 2008 ===
North Carolina House of Representatives 95th district Republican primary election, 2008
Party	Candidate	Votes	%
Republican	Grey Mills	3,626	50.83%
Republican	Karen Ray (incumbent)	3,507	49.17%
Total votes		7,133	100%

North Carolina House of Representatives 95th district general election, 2008
Party	Candidate	Votes	%
Republican	Grey Mills	27,895	82.43%
Libertarian	Jeffrey Ober	5,304	15.67%
Write-in		643	1.90%
Total votes		33,842	100%
Republican hold			

== Committee assignments ==
=== 2023–2024 session ===
- Appropriations
- Appropriations - Transportation
- Alcoholic Beverage Control (Chair)
- Election Law and Campaign Finance Reform (Chair)
- Energy and Public Utilities
- Judiciary I (Vice Chair)
- Redistricting
- Rules, Calendar, and Operations of the House

=== 2021–2022 session ===
- Appropriations
- Appropriations, Health and Human Services
- Education - Universities
- Election Law and Campaign Finance Reform - Chairman
- Judiciary 1 - Vice Chairman
- Redistricting
- Rules, Calendar, and Operations of the House
- Legislative Ethics Committee - Co-Chair
- Legislative Research Commission

=== 2011–2012 session ===
- Appropriations - Central Government
- Elections
- Government
- Insurance
- Judiciary
- Transportation - Chair

=== 2009–2010 session ===
- Aging
- Appropriations - Central Government
- Commerce, Small Business, and Entrepreneurship
- Education - Universities
- Judiciary 3
- Water Resources and Infrastructure

North Carolina House of Representatives
Preceded by Karen Ray	Member of the North Carolina House of Representatives from the 95th district 2009–2013	Succeeded by Robert Brawley
Preceded by John Fraley	Member of the North Carolina House of Representatives from the 95th district 2021–2025	Succeeded by Todd Carver
