= North Carolina's 56th House district =

American legislative district

North Carolina's 56th State House of Representatives district
Representative
Allen Buansi; D–Chapel Hill
- Demographics: 63% White; 12% Black; 9% Hispanic; 11% Asian; 4% Multiracial
- Population (2024): 85,274

North Carolina's 56th House district is one of 120 districts in the North Carolina House of Representatives. It has been represented by Democrat Allen Buansi since his appointment on June 1, 2022.

== Geography ==
Since 2003, the district has included part of Orange County. The district overlaps with the 23rd Senate district.

== District officeholders since 1985 ==
Representative	Party	Dates	Notes	Counties
District created January 1, 1985.
Jo Graham Foster (Charlotte)	Democratic	January 1, 1985 – January 1, 1993	Redistricted from the 36th district.	1985–2003; Part of Mecklenburg County.
Martha Alexander (Charlotte)	Democratic	January 1, 1993 – January 1, 2003	Redistricted to the 106th district.	1985–2003; Part of Mecklenburg County.
Verla Insko (Chapel Hill)	Democratic	January 1, 2003 – May 31, 2022	Redistricted from the 24th district. Retired and resigned early.	2003–Present; Part of Orange County.
Vacant		May 31, 2022 – June 1, 2022		2003–Present; Part of Orange County.
Allen Buansi (Chapel Hill)	Democratic	June 1, 2022 – Present	Appointed to finish Insko's term.	2003–Present; Part of Orange County.

== Election results ==
=== 2024 ===
North Carolina House of Representatives 56th district general election, 2024
Party	Candidate	Votes	%
Democratic	Allen Buansi (incumbent)	39,459	86.29%
Republican	Jeffrey Hoagland	6,267	13.71%
Total votes		45,726	100%
Democratic hold			

=== 2022 ===
North Carolina House of Representatives 56th district Democratic primary election, 2022
Party	Candidate	Votes	%
Democratic	Allen Buansi	7,715	51.54%
Democratic	Jonah Garson	7,253	48.46%
Total votes		14,968	100%

North Carolina House of Representatives 56th district general election, 2022
Party	Candidate	Votes	%
Democratic	Allen Buansi (incumbent)	32,064	100%
Total votes		32,064	100%
Democratic hold			

=== 2020 ===
North Carolina House of Representatives 56th district Democratic primary election, 2020
Party	Candidate	Votes	%
Democratic	Verla Insko (incumbent)	20,389	85.64%
Democratic	Joe Parrish	3,418	14.36%
Total votes		23,807	100%

North Carolina House of Representatives 56th district general election, 2020
Party	Candidate	Votes	%
Democratic	Verla Insko (incumbent)	38,428	100%
Total votes		38,428	100%
Democratic hold			

=== 2018 ===
North Carolina House of Representatives 56th district general election, 2018
Party	Candidate	Votes	%
Democratic	Verla Insko (incumbent)	32,286	86.15%
Republican	Marcus Cooke	4,235	11.30%
Libertarian	Matthew P. Clements	955	2.55%
Total votes		37,476	100%
Democratic hold			

=== 2016 ===
North Carolina House of Representatives 56th district general election, 2016
Party	Candidate	Votes	%
Democratic	Verla Insko (incumbent)	43,144	100%
Total votes		43,144	100%
Democratic hold			

=== 2014 ===
North Carolina House of Representatives 56th district general election, 2014
Party	Candidate	Votes	%
Democratic	Verla Insko (incumbent)	25,601	81.19%
Republican	David "Dave" Pratt Carter	5,932	18.81%
Total votes		31,533	100%
Democratic hold			

=== 2012 ===
North Carolina House of Representatives 56th district general election, 2012
Party	Candidate	Votes	%
Democratic	Verla Insko (incumbent)	35,173	77.44%
Republican	Karrie Mead	10,248	22.56%
Total votes		45,421	100%
Democratic hold			

=== 2010 ===
North Carolina House of Representatives 56th district general election, 2010
Party	Candidate	Votes	%
Democratic	Verla Insko (incumbent)	17,737	100%
Total votes		17,737	100%
Democratic hold			

=== 2008 ===
North Carolina House of Representatives 56th district general election, 2008
Party	Candidate	Votes	%
Democratic	Verla Insko (incumbent)	30,835	100%
Total votes		30,835	100%
Democratic hold			

=== 2006 ===
North Carolina House of Representatives 56th district general election, 2006
Party	Candidate	Votes	%
Democratic	Verla Insko (incumbent)	14,472	100%
Total votes		14,472	100%
Democratic hold			

=== 2004 ===
North Carolina House of Representatives 56th district general election, 2004
Party	Candidate	Votes	%
Democratic	Verla Insko (incumbent)	25,984	100%
Total votes		25,984	100%
Democratic hold			

=== 2002 ===
North Carolina House of Representatives 56th district general election, 2002
Party	Candidate	Votes	%
Democratic	Verla Insko (incumbent)	15,805	79.98%
Libertarian	Will Shooter	3,957	20.02%
Total votes		19,762	100%
Democratic hold			

=== 2000 ===
North Carolina House of Representatives 56th district general election, 2000
Party	Candidate	Votes	%
Democratic	Martha Alexander (incumbent)	13,864	100%
Total votes		13,864	100%
Democratic hold			
