= Valerie Foushee =

American politician (born 1956)

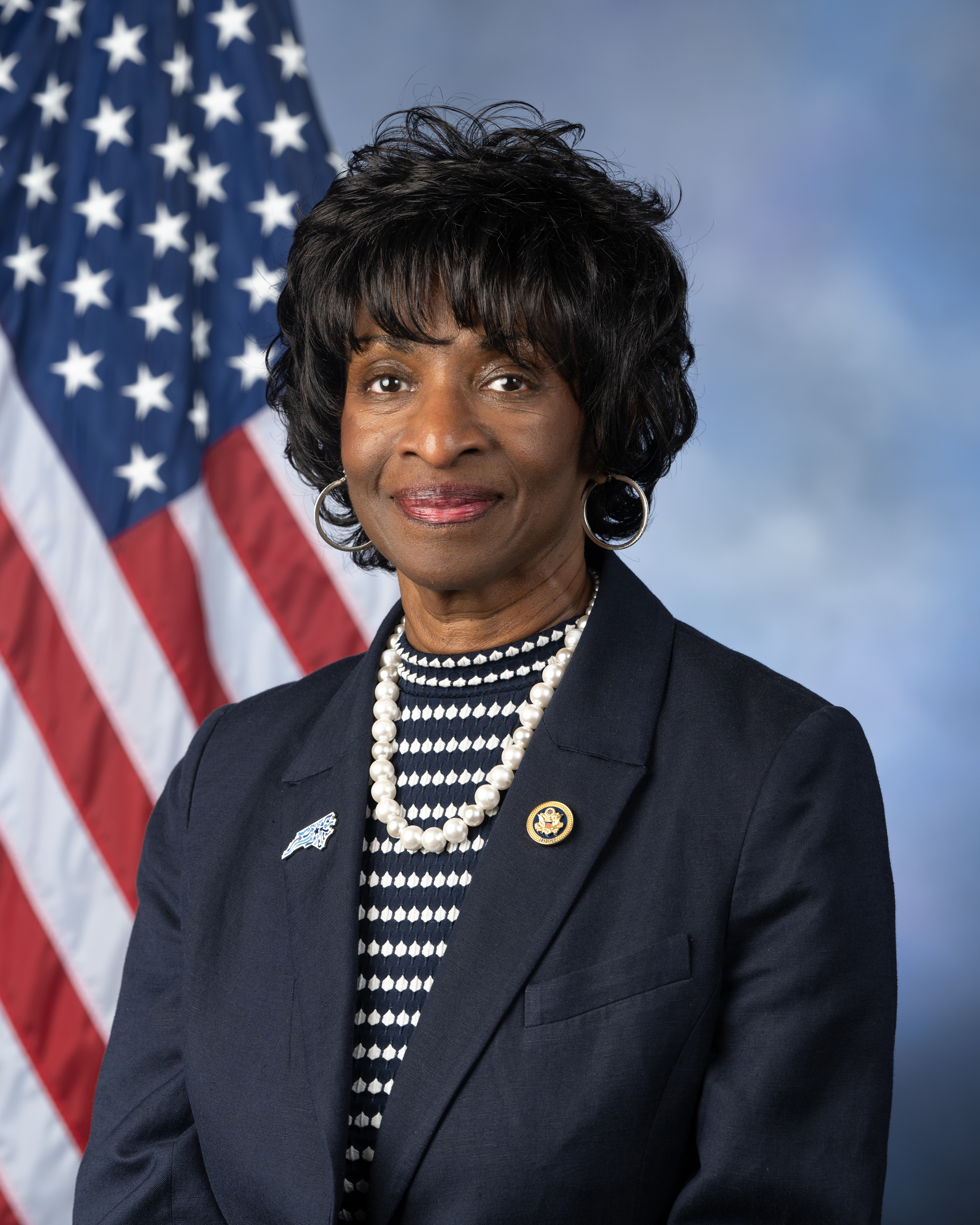
- Official portrait, 2024

Member of the U.S. House of Representatives from North Carolina's 4th district
- Incumbent
- Assumed office January 3, 2023
- Preceded by: David Price

Member of the North Carolina Senate from the 23rd district
- In office September 13, 2013 – January 1, 2023
- Preceded by: Eleanor Kinnaird
- Succeeded by: Graig Meyer

Member of the North Carolina House of Representatives from the 50th district
- In office January 1, 2013 – September 13, 2013
- Preceded by: Bill Faison
- Succeeded by: Graig Meyer

Personal details
- Born: Valerie Jean Paige; May 7, 1956 (age 70) Chapel Hill, North Carolina, U.S.
- Party: Democratic
- Spouse: Stanley Foushee
- Children: 2
- Education: University of North Carolina, Chapel Hill (BA)
- Website: House website Campaign website
- Foushee's voice Foushee questioning witnesses on diversity in pilot education programs. Recorded February 7, 2023

Valerie Jean Foushee (/fuˈʃiː/ foo-SHEE; née Paige; born May 7, 1956) is an American politician serving since 2023 as the U.S. representative for North Carolina's 4th congressional district. A member of the Democratic Party, she served in the North Carolina House of Representatives for the 50th district in 2012 and was appointed to represent the 23rd senatorial district in 2013. She is the first African American and the first woman to represent the district in Congress.

== Early life and education ==
Foushee was born in Chapel Hill, North Carolina. She graduated from Chapel Hill High School in 1974. During her time at Chapel Hill High School, Foushee's cousin, James L. Cates Jr., was killed in an act of racial violence on Nov. 21, 1970 after attending an on-campus dance at the University of North Carolina at Chapel Hill meant to improve race relations. She later attended the University of North Carolina at Chapel Hill and earned a Bachelor of Arts degree in political science and African-American studies in 2008, at the age of 53.

== Early career ==
In 1987, Foushee began working as a secretary for the Chapel Hill Police Department, a position she held until 2008. While raising her children, she became involved in their education and joined the School Governance Council. In 1997, she was elected to the Chapel Hill-Carrboro City Schools Board of Education, serving until 2004, including a term as chair from 2001 to 2003.

In 2004, Foushee was elected to the Orange County Board of Commissioners. She served until 2012, chairing the board from 2008 to 2010.

== State legislature ==
Foushee was elected to the North Carolina House of Representatives in 2012. Local Democrats selected her to fill a vacancy in the North Carolina Senate caused by Eleanor Kinnaird's resignation in 2013. During the legislative session beginning in 2015, Foushee was one of 12 African Americans serving in the North Carolina Senate.

=== Committees ===
During the 2021–22 session, Foushee served on the following Standing and Select Committees:

- Appropriations on Education/Higher Education
- Appropriations/Base Budget
- Commerce and Insurance
- Education/Higher Education
- Finance
- Select Committee on Nominations
- State and Local Government

== U.S. House of Representatives ==
=== 118th United States Congress (2023–2024) ===
Foushee was sworn in as a member of the 118th Congress on January 7, 2023. In October, Foushee voted in favor of the Removal of Kevin McCarthy as Speaker of the House saying "for the entirety of this Congress, Speaker Kevin McCarthy has continuously led our chamber into chaos by encouraging extreme partisanship". Foushee would later vote against Representative Mike Johnson in the October 2023 Speaker of the United States House of Representatives election, electing to vote for Hakeem Jeffries repeatedly.

Following the Withdrawal of Joe Biden from the 2024 United States presidential election, Foushee prasied Biden for "putting people over politics with his decision" while announcing her support for Vice President Kamala Harris' candidacy.

In September 2024, Foushee's bipartisan Innovating Mitigation Partnerships for Asphalt and Concrete Technologies (IMPACT) Act to decarbonize and improve the efficiency of cement, concrete, and asphalt production passed the Republican-majority House unanimously by voice vote. She would later introduce the IMPACT Act 2.0.

=== 119th United States Congress (2025–2026) ===
Foushee boycotted the 2025 Donald Trump speech to a joint session of Congress and Trump's 2026 State of the Union Address. Foushee repeatedly voted against government funding bills in 2025, including the Continuing resolution passed on November 12, 2025, which ended the 2025 United States federal government shutdown. Foushee said in a statement that the resolution "fails to address the rising cost of living and the escalating healthcare crisis our nation is facing".

In March 2025, the IMPACT Act would again pass the House, meaning Foushee had successfully passed a Sierra Club-endorsed bill through two separate Republican House majorities. This time, Senators Chris Coons and Thom Tillis would introduce a companion bill in the Senate.

Foushee also voted against Donald Trump's One Big Beautiful Bill Act which increased the ICE budget by over $75 billion, saying "destroying vital services that countless Americans rely on to carve out tax breaks for billionaires reveals exactly who the Republicans are truly looking out for".

On January 22, 2026, Foushee voted against the United States Department of Homeland Security Appropriations Act of 2026, stating that she had "no interest in providing funding to this rogue agency" and that "ICE must be dismantled immediately to save lives". In early March of the same year, Foushee again voted against funding for the Department of Homeland Security.

=== Party leadership ===
On January 14, 2025, Foushee was elected to the position of Regional Whip by her House Democratic Caucus colleagues for Region 7, which includes North Carolina, Louisiana, Tennessee, Mississippi, Alabama, South Carolina, and the United States Virgin Islands.

=== Ideology ===
Despite being a member of the New Democrat Coalition, Foushee typically frames herself as a progressive and is a member of the Congressional Progressive Caucus. She was endorsed by the Congressional Progressive Caucus PAC in the 2022 and 2026 North Carolina Democratic primaries, though her opponent Nida Allam was publicly described by NBC News and The New York Times as a "progressive challenger". In 2026, she stated her priority in Congress is "delivering progressive legislation and federal funding that our district expects in a Congressional representative". She is a supporter of the Green New Deal, Medicare for All Act, and the Block the Bombs Act to stop the sale of offensive weapons to Israel.

While fellow members of Congress criticized Zohran Mamdani following his Democratic primary victory in 2025, Foushee condemned what she categorized as "Islamophobic smears" attacking Mamdani. Later that year, she would vote against a House Resolution titled 'denouncing the horrors of socialism'. In 2026, local outlets noted throughout her Democratic primary against Bernie Sanders-endorsed challenger Nida Allam that "there's not much difference in how she and Foushee would vote" and that both were "both solidly left of most House Democrats". When asked about Allam positioning herself to the left of Foushee on the political spectrum, Foushee responded "I was a progressive before she was born".

=== Committee assignments ===
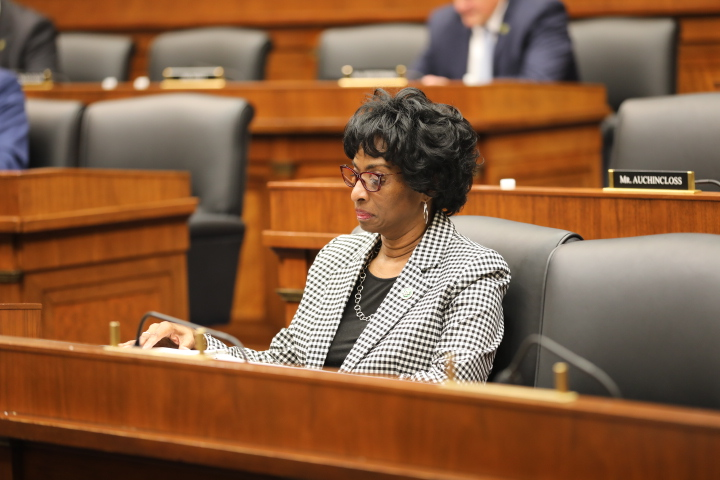
Foushee on the House Transportation Committee, 2023

For the 119th Congress:

- Committee on Science, Space, and Technology
  - Subcommittee on Energy
  - Subcommittee on Space and Aeronautics (Ranking Member)
- Committee on Transportation and Infrastructure
  - Subcommittee on Aviation
  - Subcommittee on Railroads, Pipelines and Hazardous Materials

=== Caucus memberships ===
- Black Maternal Health Caucus
- Congressional Asian Pacific American Caucus
- Congressional Black Caucus
- Congressional Caucus for the Equal Rights Amendment
- Congressional Equality Caucus
- Congressional Progressive Caucus
- New Democrat Coalition

== Political positions ==
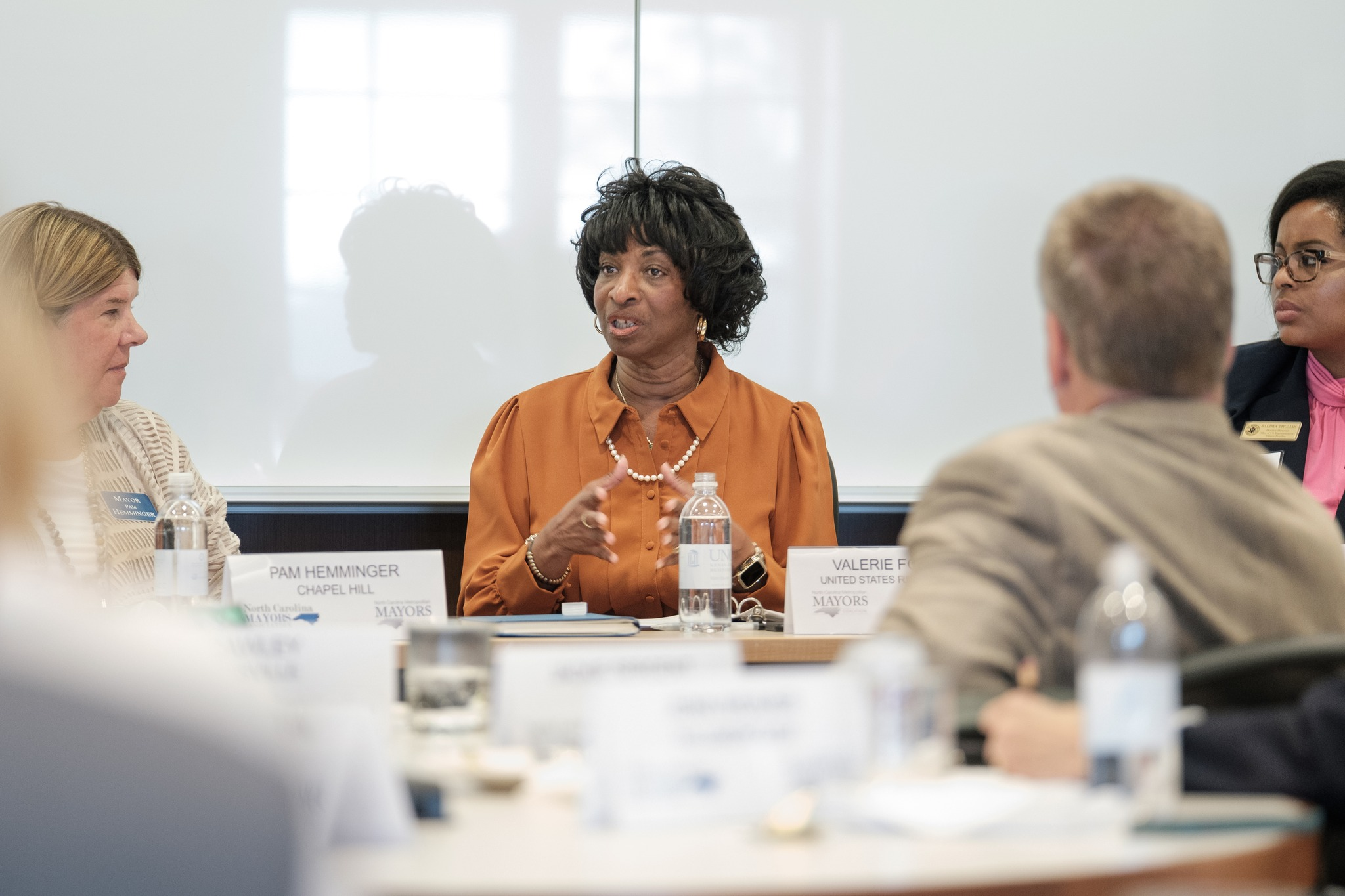
Foushee meets with local elected town and city officials in her congressional district, 2023

=== Data centers ===
In December 2025, Foushee joined Senator Elizabeth Warren and Representative Madeleine Dean's Congressional letter urging the United States Department of Commerce to investigate conflicts of interest in the Trump Administration and if they've affected AI data center policy decisions.

Following questions regarding her position against the construction of a proposed data center in her district in 2026, Foushee clarified in a social media video that she does not support the construction of a proposed data center in Apex, North Carolina. Foushee is an original cosponsor of Rep. Bonnie Watson Coleman's Data Center Community Impact Act to authorize a federal study on the environmental, economic, and public health impacts of data centers, with a focus on communities of color and low-income communities.

=== Immigration ===
Though Foushee has repeatedly stated publicly that she supports "defunding" and "dismantling" ICE, Foushee has declined to say specifically say she would support "abolishing" ICE.

Foushee is a cosponsor of Representative Delia Ramirez's Melt Ice Act, which Ramirez says "strikes all references to/authority for immigration detention" and "Redirects ICE funding to community-based organizations to provide wrap-around services to communities around the country".

=== Healthcare ===
Foushee supports the Medicare for All Act to establish a national universal Single-payer healthcare system. During her time as a state senator, she sponsored legislation to expand Medicaid coverage. She has been a cosponsor of the Medicare for All Act in each of her terms in Congress.

=== Foreign affairs ===
==== Defense funding ====
Though Foushee had previously voted in favor of defense funding, including funding for Ukraine during the Russo-Ukrainian war (2022–present), Foushee would vote against the National Defense Authorization Act for Fiscal Years 2024, 2025, and 2026.

==== Israel ====
Foushee voted to provide Israel with support following October 7 attacks. In March 2024, she flew to Israel as part of a trip organized by AIPAC to meet with Benjamin Netanyahu. Additionally, AIPAC supported her 2022 and 2024 campaigns for congress.

Foushee faced backlash from certain communities in North Carolina's 4th congressional district because of the 2024 trip to Israel. Upon her return, Foushee would say "Fostering diplomatic dialogue and facilitating de-escalation efforts is the only way to reach a bilateral ceasefire, ensure the release of all remaining hostages, alleviate the humanitarian crisis in Gaza, and achieve the ultimate goal of a permanent two-state solution".

Months later, Foushee would choose to boycott the 2024 visit by Benjamin Netanyahu to the United States stating that the "Netanyahu government has stalled progress towards peace". In December 2024, she signed a letter with other congress members urging President Joe Biden to negotiate a ceasefire in Gaza to prevent further loss of life and address the humanitarian crisis.

At a town hall in August 2025, Foushee announced she would not accept AIPAC donations for her 2026 reelection campaign with a campaign spokesperson quoted as saying, "AIPAC has not contributed to her campaign since February 2024." Patrick Dorton, a spokesperson for AIPAC's super PAC, United Democracy Project, later told Politico that "Rep. Foushee rejected AIPAC support and we are not involved in or participating in any way in this race".

Between August 2025 and March 2026, Foushee voted against sending billions in weapons to Israel in the United States Department of State funding package, and cosponsored the Block the Bombs Act and Ceasefire Compliance Act. It was reported that AIPAC had been lobbying aggressively against the Ceasefire Compliance Act. Foushee would later re-emphasize her desire to stop arms sales to Israel in her statements on the night of the 2026 Democratic primary election, and following her opponent conceeding the race days later.

==== 2026 Iran war ====
Foushee has been steadfast in her opposition to the 2026 Iran war. On June 24, 2025, Foushee cosponsored Republican Congressman Thomas Massie's War Powers Resolution to remove United States Armed Forces from unauthorized hostilities in the Islamic Republic of Iran.

On February 19, 2026, she condemned Trump's threats of strikes on Iran, and demanded Congress pass Reps. Thomas Massie and Ro Khanna's War Powers Resolution through a discharge petition. On February 28th, 2026, she condemned Trump’s attacks multiple times and demanded that Congress reconvene immediately to pass the bipartisan War Powers Resolution.

On March 2, 2026, she made an official public statement saying Trump is "repeating the costly mistakes of past regime-change wars that destroyed communities, destabilized entire regions, and left generations to bear the consequences." Days later, she voted in favor of passing Reps. Thomas Massie and Ro Khanna's bipartisan War Powers Resolution which ultimately failed to pass the house and voted against a bill reaffirming that Iran remained the largest state sponsor of terrorism.

=== Redistricting reform ===
In 2023, Foushee co-sponsored the Redistricting Transparency and Accountability Act alongside Representatives Deborah Ross and Wiley Nickel. This legislation aims to increase transparency in the redistricting process to address partisan gerrymandering.

== Elections ==
=== 2022 ===
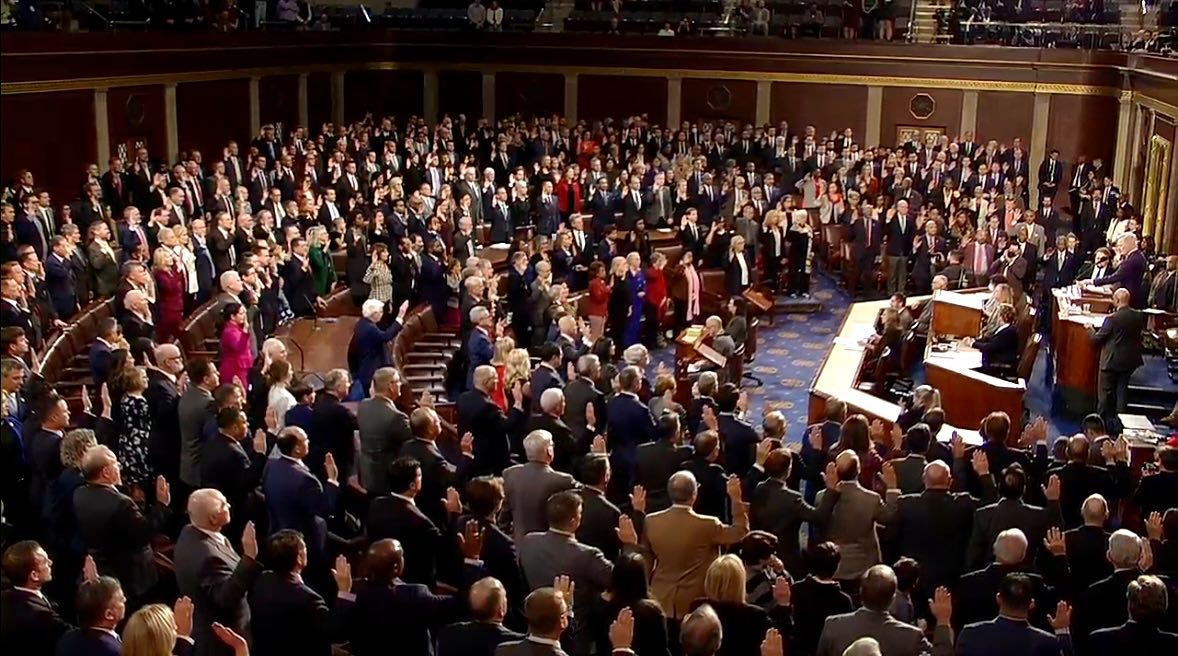
Foushee and the 118th Congress are sworn into the U.S. House of Representatives, 2023

Foushee ran for the U.S. House of Representatives for North Carolina's 4th congressional district in 2022. She won the primary against Nida Allam. She received millions in outside Super PAC spending from pro-Israel lobby groups such as American Israel Public Affairs Committee (AIPAC), Democratic Majority for Israel (DMFI), and cryptocurrency billionaire Sam Bankman-Fried's Protect Our Future PAC, prompting allegations that her campaign had succeeded primarily due to support from dark money as the race became "the most expensive Democratic congressional primary in North Carolina history" and has only since been surpassed by Foushee and Allam's rematch in the 2026 Democratic Primary. On November 8, she defeated Republican nominee Courtney Geels with 67% of the vote.

=== 2024 ===
Though North Carolina's Congressional maps were redrawn in 2023, Foushee faced no challengers in the 2024 North Carolina Democratic Primary. On November 5, 2024, Foushee was reelected to Congress with 74.9% of the vote to Republican nominee Eric Blankenburg's 23.61% and Libertarian nominee Guy Meillur's 1.49%.

=== 2026 ===
In August 2025, Foushee said she would not accept AIPAC donations or support for her reelection campaign. But in February 2026, a dark money Super PAC called Article One reported $600,000 in spending in favor of Foushee, a possible violation of Foushee's pledge to stop taking AIPAC support. Article One PAC has been found to be linked to billionaire Robert Granieri, a major donor to AIPAC. In response to these reports, Foushee said her "continued support for legislation to stop arms sales to Israel speaks for itself" and that she had "no control over outside expenditures".

Certain outlets reported Foushee had been "fishing for super PAC support" with the use of a redbox section on her website "that candidates typically put up to coordinate messages with outside groups". It was also reported that she did not respond to a letter from constituents asking her to oppose a planned datacenter in Apex. On February 25th, 2026, Foushee released a video saying "plainly, I do not support the proposed data center". That same day, a Super PAC funded by the AI and datacenter company Anthropic reported over $1.6 million in spending in support of Foushee. The company had announced plans to spend $50 billion on building new US datacenters.

One day later, Foushee issued a public statement from her Congressional office stating that Anthropic's "stepping back from key safety commitments" was "deeply troubling", and that "AI companies have a responsibility to stand by the safeguards they publicly embraced and should not weaken them in response to political pressure".

On March 3, 2026, Foushee declared victory over Nida Allam in the Democratic primary after securing the most votes, but also voiced support for Allam's request for a recount. In Foushee's statement declaring victory on the night of the primary election, she said "The people of the 4th District demand progressive change like dismantling ICE, ensuring Medicare for All, regulating AI, establishing a Green New Deal, and passing legislation to block arms sales to Israel. This remains my top priority in Congress".

On March 4, 2026, Allam would concede defeat to Foushee. Foushee would again reiterate her priorities in a statement saying, "My priorities are to stop Trump's attacks on our democracy, regulate AI, overturn Citizens United, establish a Green New Deal, ensure Medicare for All, pass legislation to block arms sales to Israel, and lower the cost of groceries, housing, and education. Nothing will ever change that".

== Personal life ==
Valerie is married to Stan Foushee. They have two sons.

== Electoral history ==
=== 2026 ===
2026 North Carolina's 4th congressional district Democratic primary election
Party	Candidate	Votes	%
Democratic	Valerie Foushee (incumbent)	61,779	49.16%
Democratic	Nida Allam	60,607	48.23%
Democratic	Mary Patterson	3,275	2.61%
Total votes		125,661	100.00%

=== 2024 ===
2024 North Carolina's 4th congressional district election
Party	Candidate	Votes	%
Democratic	Valerie Foushee (incumbent)	308,064	71.8
Republican	Eric Blankenburg	112,084	26.1
Libertarian	Guy Meilleur	8,632	2.0
Total votes		428,780	100.0
Democratic hold			

=== 2022 ===
2022 North Carolina's 4th congressional district election
Party	Candidate	Votes	%
Democratic	Valerie Foushee	194,983	66.9
Republican	Courtney Geels	96,442	33.1
Total votes		291,425	100.0
Democratic hold			

2022 North Carolina's 4th congressional district Democratic primary
Party	Candidate	Votes	%
Democratic	Valerie Foushee	40,531	46.15
Democratic	Nida Allam	32,424	36.92
Democratic	Clay Aiken	6,469	7.37
Democratic	Ashley Ward	4,730	5.39
Democratic	Richard Watkins III	1,132	1.29
Democratic	Crystal Cavalier	1,104	1.26
Democratic	Stephen Valentine	1,004	1.14
Democratic	Matt Grooms	433	0.49
Total votes		87,827	100.0

=== 2020 ===
2020 North Carolina Senate 23rd district election
Party	Candidate	Votes	%
Democratic	Valerie Foushee (incumbent)	88,429	68.31%
Republican	Tom Glendinning	41,016	31.69%
Total votes		129,445	100%
Democratic hold			

=== 2018 ===
2018 North Carolina Senate 23rd district election
Party	Candidate	Votes	%
Democratic	Valerie P. Foushee (incumbent)	73,332	71.29%
Republican	Tom Glendinning	29,530	28.71%
Total votes		102,862	100.00%
Democratic hold			

=== 2016 ===
2016 North Carolina Senate 23rd district election
Party	Candidate	Votes	%
Democratic	Valerie P. Foushee (incumbent)	79,520	68.06%
Republican	Mary Lopez Carter	37,322	31.94%
Total votes		116,842	100%
Democratic hold			

=== 2014 ===
2014 North Carolina Senate 23rd district election
Party	Candidate	Votes	%
Democratic	Valerie Foushee (incumbent)	53,652	68.20%
Republican	Mary Lopez-Carter	25,021	31.80%
Total votes		78,673	100%
Democratic hold			

=== 2012 ===
2012 North Carolina House of Representatives 50th district election
Party	Candidate	Votes	%
Democratic	Valerie Foushee	24,806	55.04%
Republican	Rod Chaney	20,266	44.96%
Total votes		45,072	100%
Democratic hold			

2012 North Carolina House of Representatives 50th district Democratic primary
Party	Candidate	Votes	%
Democratic	Valerie Foushee	11,351	80.53
Democratic	Travis A. Phelps	2,744	19.47
Total votes		14,095	100.0

== See also ==
- List of African-American United States representatives
- Women in the United States House of Representatives

U.S. House of Representatives
Preceded by David Price	Member of the U.S. House of Representatives from North Carolina's 4th congressional district 2023–present	Incumbent
U.S. order of precedence (ceremonial)
Preceded by Mike Ezell	United States representatives by seniority 307th	Succeeded by Maxwell Frost
