= Red box =

Red box or Red Box may refer to:

== Art, entertainment, and media ==
- Red Box (band), a British band
- Redbox, a defunct DVD rental service
- The Red Box, a book by Rex Stout
- "(Open Up the) Red Box", a song by Simply Red

== Other uses ==
- Red-boxing, American political campaign tactic
- Red box (government), the red, wooden briefcases used by the British government and monarch
- Red box (phreaking), a phreaking device
- Eucalyptus polyanthemos, a tree species commonly known as red box
- Tornado watch, sometimes referred to as a "red box" by meteorologists and storm chasers
- Red Box, California, an unincorporated community in Los Angeles County, California, United States

== See also ==
- Red telephone box
