= North Carolina's 50th House district =

American legislative district

North Carolina's 50th State House of Representatives district
Representative
Renee Price; D–Hillsborough
- Demographics: 68% White; 13% Black; 11% Hispanic; 3% Asian; 5% Multiracial
- Population (2024): 86,808

North Carolina's 50th House district is one of 120 districts in the North Carolina House of Representatives. It has been represented by Democrat Renee Price since 2023.

== Geography ==
Since 2019, the district has included all of Caswell County, as well as part of Orange County. The district overlaps with the 23rd Senate district.

== District officeholders since 1985 ==
Representative	Party	Dates	Notes	Counties
Larry Justus (Hendersonville)	Republican	January 1, 1985 – October 20, 2002	Died. Redistricted to the 117th district and re-elected posthumously.	1985–1993; Part of Henderson County.
Larry Justus (Hendersonville)	Republican	January 1, 1985 – October 20, 2002	Died. Redistricted to the 117th district and re-elected posthumously.	1993–2003; Parts of Henderson and Polk counties.
Vacant		October 20, 2002 – November 13, 2002		1993–2003; Parts of Henderson and Polk counties.
Carolyn Justus (Hendersonville)	Republican	November 13, 2002 – January 1, 2003	Appointed to finish her husband's term and to the next term in the 117th district.	1993–2003; Parts of Henderson and Polk counties.
Russell Capps (Raleigh)	Republican	January 1, 2003 – January 1, 2005	Redistricted from the 92nd district. Redistricted to the 41st district.	2003–2005; Part of Wake County.
Bill Faison (Cedar Grove)	Democratic	January 1, 2005 – January 1, 2013	Retired to run for Governor.	2005–2013; All of Caswell County. Part of Orange County.
Valerie Foushee (Chapel Hill)	Democratic	January 1, 2013 – September 13, 2013	Resigned to assume seat in the State Senate.	2013–2019; Parts of Orange and Durham counties.
Vacant		September 13, 2013 – October 30, 2013		2013–2019; Parts of Orange and Durham counties.
Graig Meyer (Chapel Hill)	Democratic	October 30, 2013 – January 1, 2023	Appointed to finish Foushee's term. Retired to run for State Senate.	2013–2019; Parts of Orange and Durham counties.
Graig Meyer (Chapel Hill)	Democratic	October 30, 2013 – January 1, 2023	Appointed to finish Foushee's term. Retired to run for State Senate.	2019–Present; All of Caswell County. Part of Orange County.
Renee Price (Hillsborough)	Democratic	January 1, 2023 – Present		2019–Present; All of Caswell County. Part of Orange County.

== Election results ==
=== 2026 ===
North Carolina House of Representatives 50th district Democratic primary election, 2026
Party	Candidate	Votes	%
Democratic	Renee Price (incumbent)	10,189	74.01%
Democratic	Mary Lucas	3,039	22.07%
Democratic	Brandall Redd	539	3.92%
Total votes		13,767	100%

North Carolina House of Representatives 50th district general election, 2026
Party	Candidate	Votes	%
Democratic	Renee Price (incumbent)		100%
Total votes			100%
Democratic hold			

=== 2024 ===
North Carolina House of Representatives 50th district general election, 2024
Party	Candidate	Votes	%
Democratic	Renee Price (incumbent)	35,367	100%
Total votes		35,367	100%
Democratic hold			

=== 2022 ===
North Carolina House of Representatives 50th district Democratic primary election, 2022
Party	Candidate	Votes	%
Democratic	Renee Price	8,458	72.02%
Democratic	Matt Hughes	3,286	27.98%
Total votes		11,744	100%

North Carolina House of Representatives 50th district general election, 2022
Party	Candidate	Votes	%
Democratic	Renee Price	22,732	59.45%
Republican	Charles Lopez	15,503	40.55%
Total votes		38,235	100%
Democratic hold			

=== 2020 ===
North Carolina House of Represesntatives 50th district general election, 2020
Party	Candidate	Votes	%
Democratic	Graig Meyer (incumbent)	35,901	100%
Total votes		35,901	100%
Democratic hold			

=== 2018 ===
North Carolina House of Representatives 50th district general election, 2018
Party	Candidate	Votes	%
Democratic	Graig Meyer (incumbent)	23,292	62.11%
Republican	Kenneth Price Rothrock	14,210	37.89%
Total votes		37,502	100%
Democratic hold			

=== 2016 ===
North Carolina House of Represesntatives 50th district general election, 2016
Party	Candidate	Votes	%
Democratic	Graig Meyer (incumbent)	27,278	57.28%
Republican	Rod Chaney	20,347	42.72%
Total votes		47,625	100%
Democratic hold			

=== 2014 ===
North Carolina House of Representatives 50th district Republican primary election, 2014
Party	Candidate	Votes	%
Republican	Rod Chaney	2,607	79.10%
Republican	W. Lewis Hannah Jr.	689	20.90%
Total votes		3,296	100%

North Carolina House of Represesntatives 50th district general election, 2014
Party	Candidate	Votes	%
Democratic	Graig Meyer (incumbent)	18,574	57.16%
Republican	Rod Chaney	13,920	42.84%
Total votes		32,494	100%
Democratic hold			

=== 2012 ===
North Carolina House of Representatives 50th district Democratic primary election, 2012
Party	Candidate	Votes	%
Democratic	Valerie Foushee	11,351	80.53%
Democratic	Travis A. Phelps	2,744	19.47%
Total votes		14,095	100%

North Carolina House of Representatives 50th district Republican primary election, 2012
Party	Candidate	Votes	%
Republican	Rod Chaney	2,920	44.68%
Republican	Jason Chambers	2,120	32.44%
Republican	Thomas Samuel Wright	894	13.68%
Republican	W. Lewis Hannah Jr.	602	9.21%
Total votes		6,536	100%

North Carolina House of Representatives 50th district election, 2012
Party	Candidate	Votes	%
Democratic	Valerie Foushee	24,806	55.04%
Republican	Rod Chaney	20,266	44.96%
Total votes		45,072	100%
Democratic hold			

=== 2010 ===
North Carolina House of Represesntatives 50th district general election, 2010
Party	Candidate	Votes	%
Democratic	Bill Faison (incumbent)	13,848	56.17%
Republican	Rick Smith	10,804	43.83%
Total votes		24,652	100%
Democratic hold			

=== 2008 ===
North Carolina House of Representatives 50th district general election, 2008
Party	Candidate	Votes	%
Democratic	Bill Faison (incumbent)	25,682	100%
Total votes		25,682	100%
Democratic hold			

=== 2006 ===
North Carolina House of Representatives 50th district general election, 2006
Party	Candidate	Votes	%
Democratic	Bill Faison (incumbent)	12,516	100%
Total votes		12,516	100%
Democratic hold			

=== 2004 ===
North Carolina House of Representatives 50th district Democratic primary election, 2004
Party	Candidate	Votes	%
Democratic	Bill Faison	4,265	52.32%
Democratic	Barry Jacobs	3,436	42.15%
Democratic	Joel F. Knight II	303	3.72%
Democratic	Duke Underwood	147	1.80%
Total votes		8,151	100%

North Carolina House of Representatives 50th district general election, 2004
Party	Candidate	Votes	%
Democratic	Bill Faison	21,614	100%
Total votes		21,614	100%
Democratic win (new seat)			

=== 2002 ===
North Carolina House of Representatives 50th district general election, 2002
Party	Candidate	Votes	%
Republican	Russell Capps (incumbent)	19,636	80.85%
Libertarian	Lee Griffin	4,650	19.15%
Total votes		24,286	100%
Republican hold			

=== 2000 ===
North Carolina House of Representatives 50th district general election, 2000
Party	Candidate	Votes	%
Republican	Larry Justus (incumbent)	24,716	100%
Total votes		24,716	100%
Republican hold			
