= Bill Faison =

American politician from North Carolina

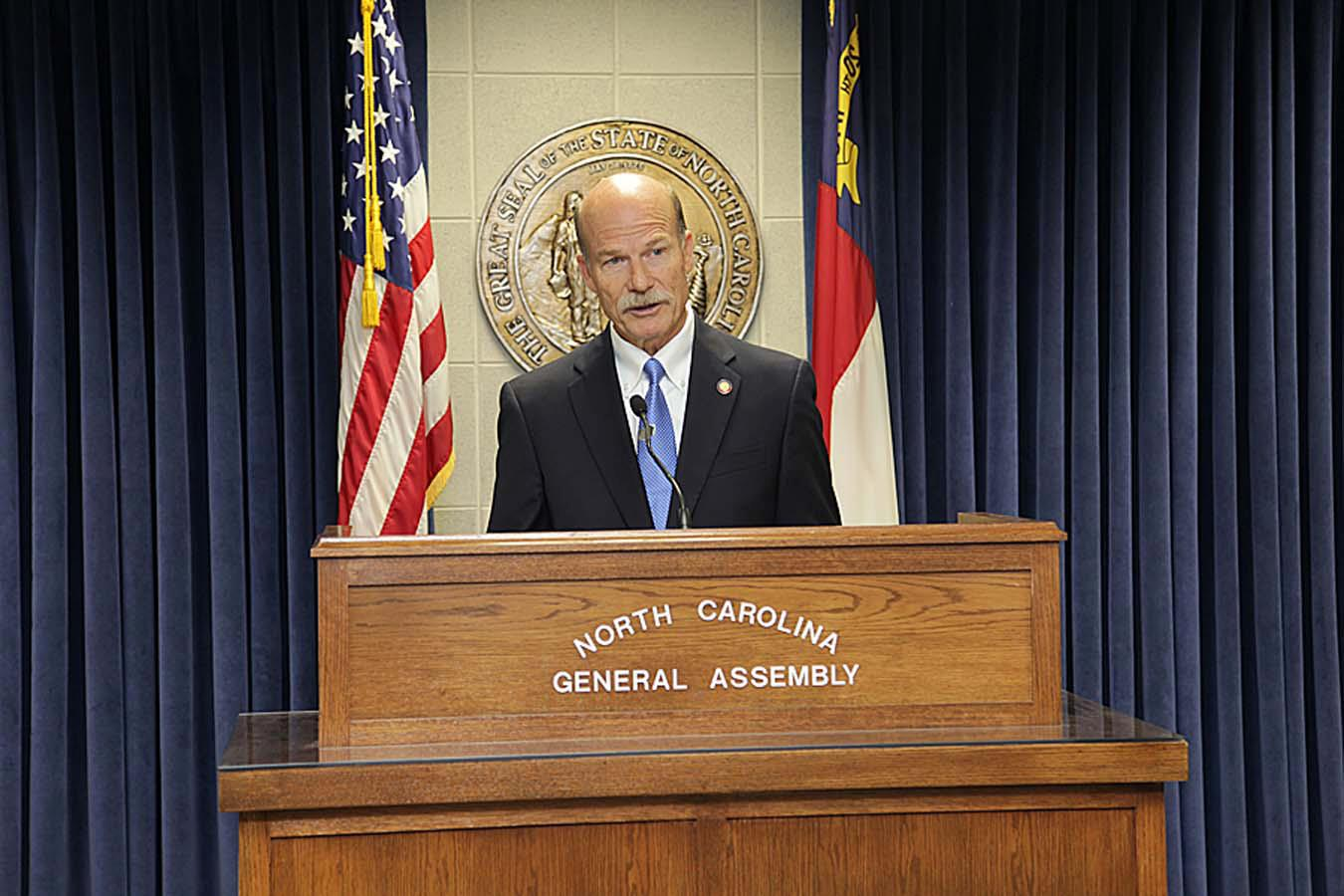

Member of the North Carolina House of Representatives from the 50th district
- In office January 1, 2005 – January 1, 2013
- Preceded by: Constituency established
- Succeeded by: Valerie Foushee

Personal details
- Born: February 7, 1947 (age 79) Raleigh, North Carolina, U.S.
- Party: Democratic
- Children: 6
- Education: University of North Carolina at Chapel Hill
- Profession: Trial Lawyer
- Website: www.billfaisonlaw.com

Bill Faison is a former member of the North Carolina House of Representatives who represented the 50th district from 2005 to 2013. He is a member of the Democratic Party.

== Early life, education, and early career ==
Faison was born in Raleigh, grew up in Knightdale, was educated in Chapel Hill (AB 1969, JD 1972), and lives in Cedar Grove in northern Orange County. He is a single father, a teacher, a farmer, a businessman, and a trial lawyer. He practices law with Faison & Gillespie in Durham, North Carolina, representing people who have been injured by medical negligence and corporate negligence. He has won for his clients numerous jury verdicts of more than a million dollars.

== North Carolina House of Representatives ==
=== Elections ===
After redistricting, incumbent Republican State Representative Russell Capps decided to run in the newly redrawn North Carolina's 41st House District. Faison decided to run in the vacant 50th House District, and won unopposed in 2004. He won re-election unopposed in 2006 and 2008. In 2010, he won re-election to a fourth term defeating Republican nominee Rick Smith 56%-44%.

=== Tenure ===
Faison represents Caswell County and most of Orange County in the NC House. He is a staunch supporter and advocate for jobs, education and health care in the North Carolina General Assembly. With three children in college and one in high school, he understands how important it is to set good policy for the future.

Faison was identified as a potential candidate for governor in 2008. However, with the emergence of both State Treasurer Richard Moore and Lt. Governor Beverly Perdue as candidates, Faison declined to run. Lt. Governor Perdue eventually won the primary.

In a weekly column called Bill's Seat in The Caswell Messenger and The News of Orange, Faison updates his constituents about current legislation in the North Carolina General Assembly.

In the most recent legislative session, he spoke out on telecommunications legislation in the NC House. Faison said, in an interview with North Carolina Public Radio, that the bill should be called "the Time Warner cable anti-competitive bill."

"It's a New York company bill, it's not even folks from around here's bill, to keep our municipalities from providing services to their citizens," Rep. Faison said.

Faison also spoke out on the E-Verify bill, saying that the bill was so broadly written that if a city wanted to contract with a realtor to help sell a property, or had its accounts handled by a local bank, those entire companies would have to implement E-Verify for all future hires.

"Folks, I didn't come down here to impose greater regulation on business in this state," Faison told the Committee.

Faison explained that the bill was too broad and focused on illegal immigration.

"It's not focused on the common sense of how we go about getting services rendered within a community. There's such a target lock on who we're out trying to get that the collateral damage has been ignored," said Faison.

A list of bills Faison introduced and supported in the NC House are available at the NC General Assembly website.

On September 8, 2011, Representative Faison held a press conference to challenge the North Carolina Republican Party leadership in the North Carolina General Assembly to tackle the issues of high unemployment. Faison issued a three-step challenge calling on the leadership to address the issue of JOBS in the upcoming Special Session. Faison explained the challenge in an opinion editorial.

On September 13, 2011, Faison was Chairman of the House Democrats' Business Caucus.

=== Committee assignments ===
Faison has served as Chairman of the House Democrats' Business Caucus, Chairman of the House Study Committee on Rural Highspeed Internet Access, Chairman of the Ways and Means/Broadband Connectivity Committee, Vice Chairman of Judiciary III Committee Vice Chairman of the Public Utilities Committee, Vice Chairman of the Agriculture and Energy Committee, Member of the Finance Committee, Member of the House Study Committee on 911 Funding Formula, Member of the House Study Committee on Coyote Nuisance Abatement, Member of the Insurance Committee, Member of the Joint Select Committee on Economic Recovery and Member of the National Conference of State Legislators.

== 2012 gubernatorial primary and 2014 bankruptcy ==
On January 28, 2012 Faison announced that he would run for governor of North Carolina. He announced in Greensboro with his kids at his side.

Bill Faison for Governor has launched a new campaign website and a policy agenda for workforce for the 21st Century. On February 13, 2012, he officially filed for the office of governor in Raleigh, NC. On February 22, 2012, he will launch statewide television ads, the first in the primary campaign. On March 4, 2012, John Frank reported on Faison's campaign team, which included former Knightdale, NC mayor and lobbyist Jeanne Milliken Bonds as his chief strategist, Neil Kammerman, and Scott Dworkin.

Faison's campaign faced early challenges arising from personal issues. On Feb 13, Faison faced questions about his second divorce which includes accusations of extramarital affairs. His decision to run in spite of it raised the question about how much a candidate's private behavior matters these days.

In January 2014, Faison filed for bankruptcy protection. A federal court document Faison filed Jan 3 lists the Orange County personal injury attorney as having assets of $9.4 million and liabilities of $7.2 million.

North Carolina House of Representatives
Preceded by Russell Capps	Member of the North Carolina House of Representatives from the 50th district 2005-2013	Succeeded by Valerie Foushee
