= Graig R. Meyer =

American politician

Graig Meyer
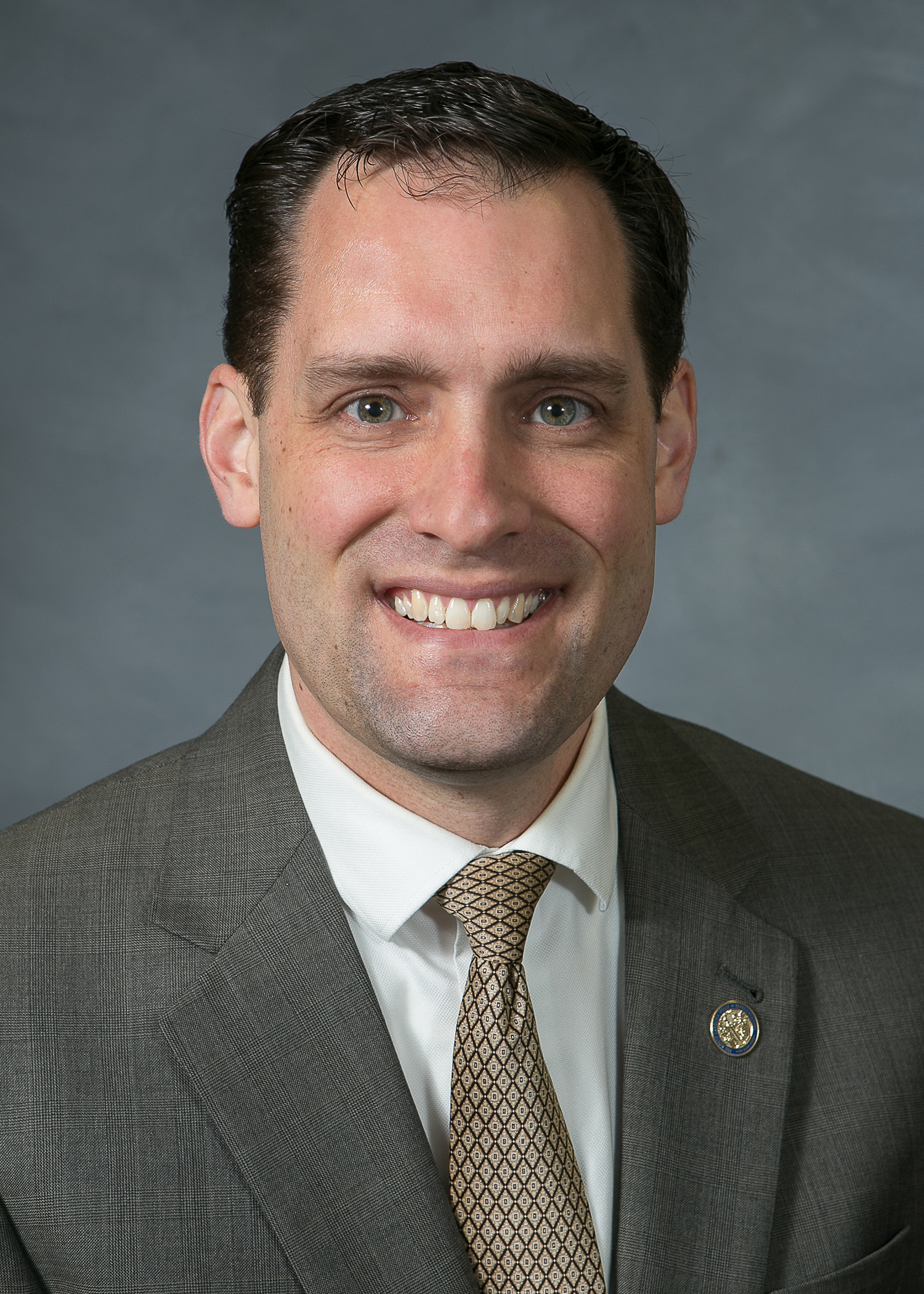

Member of the North Carolina Senate from the 23rd district
- In office January 1, 2023 – March 31, 2026
- Preceded by: Valerie Foushee
- Succeeded by: Jonah Garson

Member of the North Carolina House of Representatives from the 50th district
- In office October 30, 2013 – January 1, 2023
- Preceded by: Valerie Foushee
- Succeeded by: Renee Price

Personal details
- Born: July 5, 1974 (age 52) Cleveland, Ohio, U.S.
- Party: Democratic
- Spouse: Kym
- Children: 6
- Education: College of Wooster (BA); University of Chicago (MA)
- Occupation: Social Worker
- Website: Official website

Graig R. Meyer (born July 5, 1974) is an American politician who served as a Democratic member of the North Carolina Senate. He represented the 23rd district (which includes all of Orange, Caswell, and Person counties) from 2023 to 2026. He previously served as a member of the North Carolina House of Representatives, where he was elected to the 50th district seat 4 times. In 2022, Meyer announced his candidacy for District 23 of the North Carolina Senate, that district includes all of Caswell, Orange and Person counties, and was elected to that seat in November 2022.

== Early life and education ==
Meyer, the son of two politically engaged social workers, was raised in the inner city of Cleveland, Ohio. He was a Phi Beta Kappa graduate of the College of Wooster, before going on to acquire a master's degree in social work from the University of Chicago.

== Career ==
Prior to joining the House, Sen. Meyer spent sixteen years working in public schools working primarily on initiatives designed to promote educational equity. From 1998 through 2014, he was the coordinator of the Blue Ribbon Mentor-Advocate program. From 2012 through 2014, he also served as the Director of Student Equity for the Chapel Hill-Carrboro City Schools. In 2018, Meyer co-authored More Than a Mentoring Program. The book offers real-world perspective and advice on challenging systemic racism in schools.

When then-Rep. Valerie Foushee was appointed to the Senate in 2013, Meyer was selected by a local Democratic Party committee to hold the rest of her term. He was reelected in 2014 and 2016, running against Rod Chaney in both elections. He won a 2022 primary election for N.C. Senate with 84% of the vote.

During his time in the legislature, Meyer has established himself as a strong advocate for improving public education. In addition, he has worked as the founding Co-Chair of two bipartisan legislative caucuses, the Early Childhood Caucus and the Life Sciences Caucus. He has been recognized by both the League of Conservation Voters and the Young Democrats of North Carolina for his legislative leadership.

Meyer also works as a co-founder and principal consultant with The Equity Collaborative, LLC.

== Electoral history ==
=== 2022 ===
North Carolina Senate 23rd district Democratic primary election, 2022
Party	Candidate	Votes	%
Democratic	Graig Meyer	23,717	82.38%
Democratic	Jamie DeMent Holcomb	5,072	17.62%
Total votes		28,789	100%

North Carolina Senate 23rd district general election, 2022
Party	Candidate	Votes	%
Democratic	Graig Meyer	59,973	67.30%
Republican	Landon Woods	29,140	32.70%
Total votes		89,113	100%
Democratic hold			

=== 2020 ===
North Carolina House of Represesntatives 50th district general election, 2020
Party	Candidate	Votes	%
Democratic	Graig Meyer (incumbent)	35,901	100%
Total votes		35,901	100%
Democratic hold			

=== 2018 ===
North Carolina House of Representatives 50th district general election, 2018
Party	Candidate	Votes	%
Democratic	Graig Meyer (incumbent)	23,292	62.11%
Republican	Kenneth Price Rothrock	14,210	37.89%
Total votes		37,502	100%
Democratic hold			

=== 2016 ===
North Carolina House of Represesntatives 50th district general election, 2016
Party	Candidate	Votes	%
Democratic	Graig Meyer (incumbent)	27,278	57.28%
Republican	Rod Chaney	20,347	42.72%
Total votes		47,625	100%
Democratic hold			

=== 2014 ===
North Carolina House of Represesntatives 50th district general election, 2014
Party	Candidate	Votes	%
Democratic	Graig Meyer (incumbent)	18,574	57.16%
Republican	Rod Chaney	13,920	42.84%
Total votes		32,494	100%
Democratic hold			

== Committee assignments ==
=== 2021-2022 Session ===
- Appropriations
- Appropriations - Information Technology
- Appropriations
- Education - K-12
- Homeland Security, Military, and Veterans Affairs
- Regulatory Reform

=== 2019-2020 Session ===
- Alcoholic Beverage Control
- Education - K-12
- Homeland Security, Military, and Veterans Affairs
- Regulatory Reform
- Finance

=== 2017-2018 Session ===
- Education - K-12
- Homeland Security, Military, and Veterans Affairs
- Finance
- Judiciary I
- Aging

=== 2015-2016 Session ===
- Education - K-12
- Homeland Security, Military, and Veterans Affairs
- Regulatory Reform
- Finance
- Aging
- Public Utilities

North Carolina House of Representatives
Preceded by Valerie Foushee	Member of the North Carolina House of Representatives from the 50th District; 2013–2023	Succeeded by Renee Price
North Carolina Senate
Preceded by Valerie Foushee	Member of the North Carolina Senate from the 23rd District; 2023–2026	Vacant
