= Renee Price =

American politician

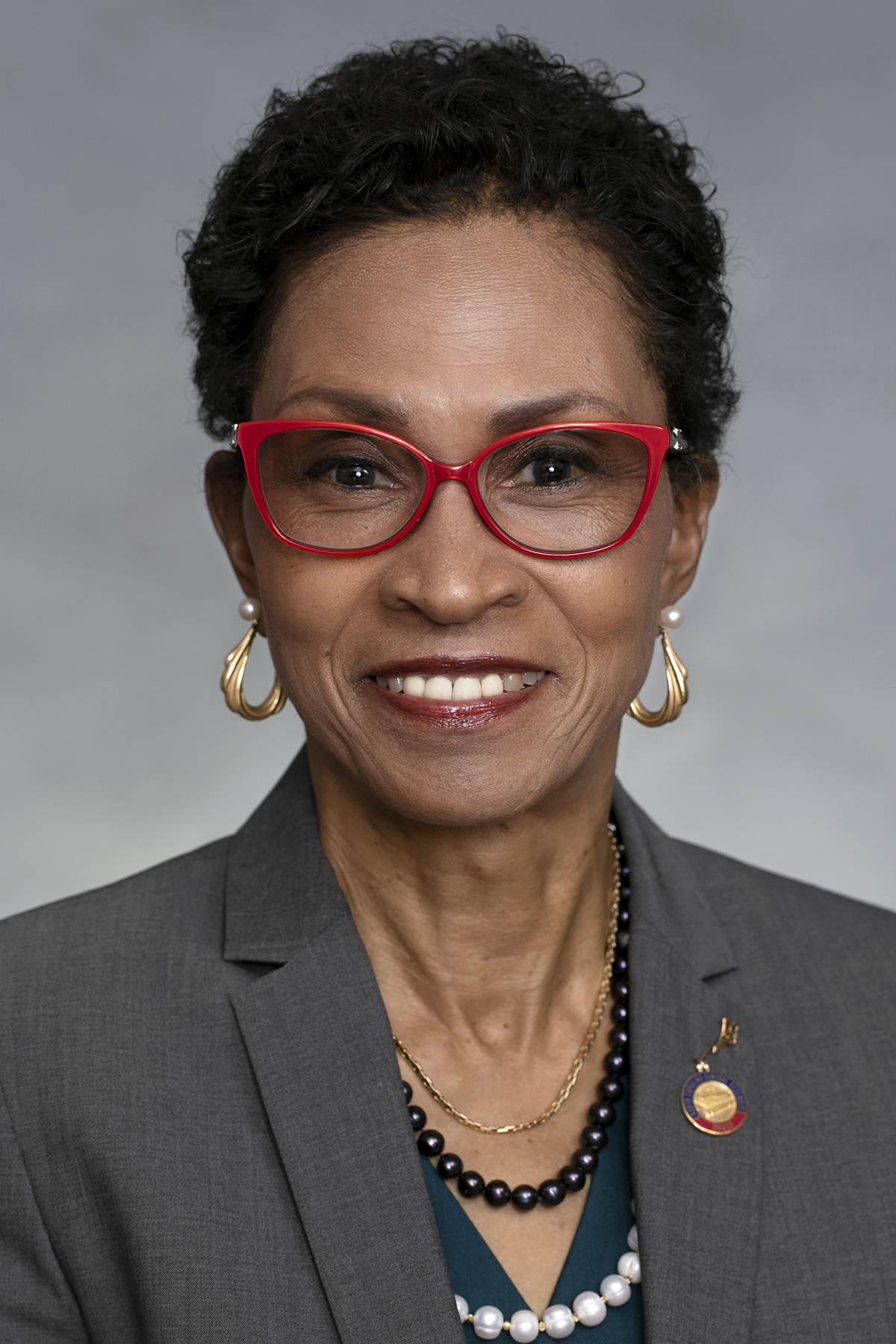

Member of the North Carolina House of Representatives from the 50th district
- Incumbent
- Assumed office January 1, 2023
- Preceded by: Graig Meyer

Member of the Orange County Board of Commissioners from the 2nd district
- In office December 6, 2012 – December 13, 2022
- Preceded by: Steve Yuhasz
- Succeeded by: Phyllis Portie-Ascott

Personal details
- Born: Rochester, New York, U.S.
- Party: Democratic
- Education: Tufts University (BA); Cornell University (MA); Colgate-Rochester Divinity School (MA)
- Website: Official website

Renee Price is an American politician from North Carolina. She is a Democratic member of the North Carolina House of Representatives, who has represented the 50th district (including all of Caswell County as well as portions of Orange County) since 2023. Price previously served as a member of the Orange County Board of Commissioners from 2012 to 2022. She's a member of the Progressive House Caucus.

== Committee assignments ==
=== 2023-2024 session ===
- Appropriations
- Appropriations - Information Technology
- Education - Community Colleges
- Local Government - Land Use, Planning and Development
- Regulatory Reform

== Electoral history ==
=== 2022 ===
North Carolina House of Representatives 50th district Democratic primary election, 2022
Party	Candidate	Votes	%
Democratic	Renee Price	8,458	72.02%
Democratic	Matt Hughes	3,286	27.98%
Total votes		11,744	100%

North Carolina House of Representatives 50th district general election, 2022
Party	Candidate	Votes	%
Democratic	Renee Price	22,732	59.45%
Republican	Charles Lopez	15,503	40.55%
Total votes		38,235	100%
Democratic hold			

=== 2020 ===
Orange County Board of Commissioners 2nd district general election, 2020
Party	Candidate	Votes	%
Democratic	Renee Price (incumbent)	66,226	100%
Total votes		66,226	100%
Democratic hold			

=== 2016 ===
Orange County Board of Commissioners 2nd district Democratic primary election, 2016
Party	Candidate	Votes	%
Democratic	Renee Price (incumbent)	6,272	60.66%
Democratic	Bonnie Hauser	4,068	39.34%
Total votes		10,340	100%

Orange County Board of Commissioners 2nd district general election, 2016
Party	Candidate	Votes	%
Democratic	Renee Price (incumbent)	63,208	100%
Total votes		63,208	100%
Democratic hold			

=== 2012 ===
Orange County Board of Commissioners 2nd district Democratic primary election, 2012
Party	Candidate	Votes	%
Democratic	Renee Price	6,253	66.83%
Democratic	Steve Yuhasz (incumbent)	3,103	33.17%
Total votes		9,356	100%

Orange County Board of Commissioners 2nd district general election, 2012
Party	Candidate	Votes	%
Democratic	Renee Price	51,197	71.14%
Republican	Chris Weaver	20,773	28.86%
Total votes		71,970	100%
Democratic hold			

=== 2010 ===
Orange County Board of Commissioners 2nd district Democratic primary election, 2010
Party	Candidate	Votes	%
Democratic	Earl McKee	2,733	50.81%
Democratic	Renee Price	2,646	49.19%
Total votes		5,379	100%

North Carolina House of Representatives
Preceded by Graig Meyer	Member of the North Carolina House of Representatives from the 50th district 2023–Present	Incumbent
