= Nida Allam =

American politician

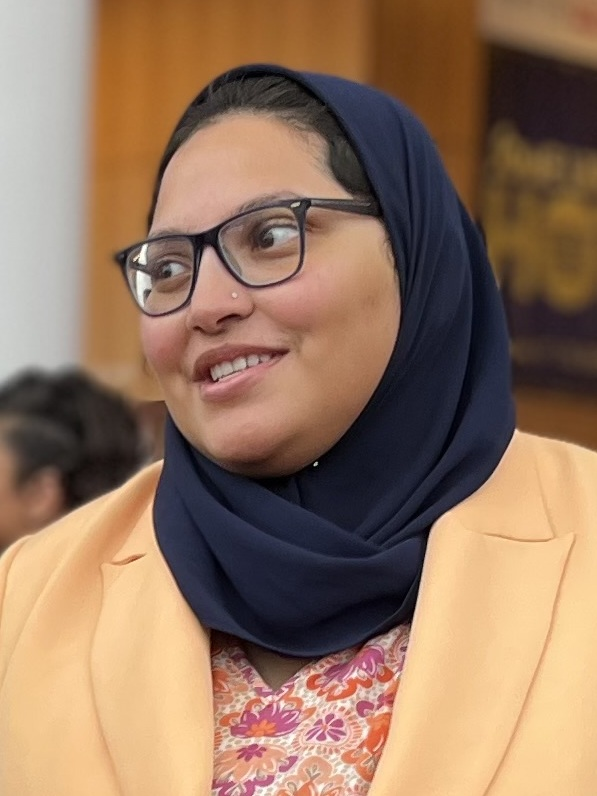
- Allam in 2025

Durham County Commissioner Vice Chair
- Incumbent
- Assumed office December 7, 2020
- Preceded by: Ellen Reckhow

Personal details
- Born: December 15, 1993 (age 32) Ottawa, Ontario, Canada
- Party: Democratic
- Spouse: Towqir Aziz
- Children: 2
- Education: North Carolina State University (BS)

Nida Allam (born December 15, 1993) is an Canadian-American politician, political activist, and data analyst. She has served on the Durham County Board of Commissioners since December 2020, making her the first Muslim woman to serve in public office in North Carolina. From 2017 to 2021, she served as the third vice-chair of the North Carolina Democratic Party, becoming the first Muslim to serve on the party's executive board.

In 2022, Allam sought the Democratic nomination for North Carolina's newly redrawn 4th congressional district, but lost to Valerie Foushee in the primary election. She challenged Foushee a second time in 2026, losing by a narrow margin.

== Early life and education ==
Allam was born on December 15, 1993, in Ottawa, Ontario, Canada. She is the daughter of immigrants, her father is from India and her mother is from Pakistan. Allam has two older sisters. When she was five years old her family moved to Brier Creek, a suburb between Raleigh and Durham in North Carolina, after her father took a job with IBM at Research Triangle Park. When she was six years old the family moved to the nearby town of Cary. She became a naturalized United States citizen as a teenager. Her mother, Iffat Allam, served as the Chair of the Women's Committee at their mosque. Allam and her mother volunteered at local food banks and helped set up homes for single mothers and refugees in the Research Triangle. A devout Muslim, she began wearing hijab full-time when she was in eighth grade.

Allam graduated from Needham B. Broughton High School, a magnet school in downtown Raleigh, where she was a member of the varsity lacrosse team. As a high school student, she chaired the Triangle Health Fair, a Muslim student-led campaign to partner with local doctors, chiropractors, and dentists to provide free health care to low-income community members.

She graduated from North Carolina State University with a degree in sustainable materials and technology. While at university, she founded the NC State For Bernie Club and became co-chair of the Triangle For Bernie Club.

== Political career ==
Allam was inspired to become politically involved after her best friend, Yusor Mohammad Abu-Salha, was one of the three people killed in the 2015 Chapel Hill shooting. She had been a bridesmaid at Abu-Salha's wedding that December. The Federal Bureau of Investigation and the United States Department of Justice also launched their own investigations into the shooting. Federal authorities could not find sufficient evidence to charge the assailant, Craig Stephen Hicks, with a hate crime. Allam became involved in the grassroots movement and worked as a political director for U.S. Senator Bernie Sanders' 2016 presidential campaign, as well as an organizing director for Justice Cheri Beasley's campaign for the North Carolina Supreme Court. She was the 2016 Political Director in North Carolina, South Carolina, New Jersey and New York for Sanders' presidential campaign. As of December 2024, she has chaired the Durham County Commission.

She is a 2019 alumna of Durham's chapter of the New Leaders Council.

=== Initial runs for office ===
Allam decided to run for public office after having worked behind the scenes in the progressive movement and with voter mobilization efforts because she believed there needed to be more progressive candidates representing the diversity of the American people. She was elected as the Third Vice Chair of the North Carolina Democratic Party in January 2017, becoming the first Muslim American to serve on the party's executive council, and was appointed as the Chair of the Durham Mayor's Council for Women in 2018.

As a member of the Mayor's Council for Women, she advised Mayor Steve Schewel on issues pertaining to the rights of women and LGBTQIA community members, especially non-binary and transgender people. As Third Vice Chair of the Democratic Party in North Carolina, she served alongside Second Chair Matt Hughes, former First Chair Aisha Dew, Party Secretary Melvin Williams, and former State Party Chairman Wayne Goodwin. She also served as a delegate at the 2016 Democratic National Convention and the 2020 Democratic National Convention.

=== Durham County Board of Commissioners ===
Allam was elected to the Durham County Board of Commissioners in 2020 with endorsements from the Durham Association of Educators, Equality North Carolina, and the People's Alliance PAC. When Allam announced her candidacy for Durham County Commissioner, her family members received Islamophobic hate mail via social media platforms. She was elected to serve alongside Nimasheena Burns, Wendy Jacobs, Heidi Carter, and Brenda Howerton. This was the first time that Durham County has had an all-woman board of commissioners in its 139-year history. Upon her election, she became the first Muslim woman to hold an elected office in North Carolina. She received 39,523 votes in the primary election and 122,947 votes in the general election, finishing ahead of all other candidates. Her election was celebrated by the Council on American–Islamic Relations and Muslim Advocates.

=== 2022 congressional candidacy ===
On November 8, 2021, Allam announced that she would be seeking the Democratic Party's nomination for the United States Congress in North Carolina's newly redrawn 4th Congressional District. If she were elected, she would have been the third Muslim woman to serve in Congress, after Ilhan Omar and Rashida Tlaib, both of whom endorsed Allam's candidacy.

Voters reported getting "Islamophobic" push polls and Allam subsequently received death threats. Allam ultimately lost the primary to her more moderate opponent, Valerie Foushee, by 9 points. While Allam received endorsements in her race from progressives, Foushee received millions of dollars in funds and assistance from pro-Israel groups such as AIPAC, DMFI and Sam Bankman-Fried's Protect Our Future PAC, prompting allegations that Foushee's campaign had succeeded primarily due to support from dark money as the race became "the most expensive Democratic congressional primary in North Carolina history".

=== 2026 congressional candidacy ===
In the summer of 2025, Allam participated in protests against United States Immigration and Customs Enforcement (ICE), criticizing the United States Department of Homeland Security's law enforcement agency for "spreading fear" throughout her community. She was filmed in public confronting federal agents attempting to detain one of her constituents.

On December 11, 2025, Allam announced that she would run in North Carolina's 4th congressional district in the 2026 elections in a primary challenge against incumbent Democratic representative Valerie Foushee. In an interview, she said she was urged to run by her constituents because "now is not the time for strongly worded letters or tweets when our families are being terrorized, when we have Trump using a Bush-era ICE agency as his own personal gestapo to murder people in broad daylight". Allam said, "We need elected leaders and just community members taking to the streets, standing up for each other. And again, a letter or a tweet is not gonna do that. The fact that our current representative doesn’t even say that we need to abolish ICE is terrifying to me".

Allam was endorsed by Bernie Sanders, former candidate Clay Aiken, Leaders We Deserve founded by gun control activist and Parkland shooting survivor David Hogg, the Sunrise Movement, the Working Families Party, and the progressive group Justice Democrats, which rose to prominence helping Alexandria Ocasio-Cortez get elected to Congress. American Priorities, a pro-Palestine super PAC created to counter the influence of the pro-Israel group AIPAC, spent over $1 million to support Allam's candidacy. AIPAC had supported Foushee in previous elections, but Foushee had since disavowed the group.

Hundreds of voters in the town of Apex sent a letter to both candidates asking them to oppose a proposed data center due to concerns about water use and rising electricity bills. Allam was the only candidate who declared that she was against the data center and she proposed a data center construction moratorium until federal AI regulations were passed. She stated that she would reject any Super PAC spending from AI or data center companies.

During the primary election held on March 3, 2026, Allam was defeated by Foushee by a margin of less than 1% and requested a recount. However, Allam conceded defeat to Foushee on March 4, 2026.

== Political views ==
Allam ran for Durham County Commissioner on a platform centered on addressing economic inequality. Campaign priorities included a $15 minimum wage for county workers, boosting mental health services in schools and investing in businesses run by women and people of color.

She believes that charter schools have increased racial segregation in Durham schools. As a county commissioner, Allam stated she plans to increase the minimum wage of Durham Public Schools classified staff to U.S. $15 an hour and enact property tax assistance programs. She has stated that evictions and lack of affordable housing opportunities are also a crisis in the county, and referenced the issue of gentrification misplacing Black families from their homes in Durham's historical African-American neighborhoods. Allam has also called for more funding and community investment into Durham Public Schools and Durham Technical Community College, saying that education is tied to economic and racial justice issues. Allam supports organized labor unions. She blames the North Carolina General Assembly for inadequate funding for public schools.

Allam has been criticized by AIPAC for her past statements and tweets in regards to Israel which some viewed as anti-Zionist or anti-Semitic. In 2021, Allam wrote an op-ed saying that she was in favor of "a movement for justice and peace, in which anti-Semitism must have no home" and that "we cannot sit by while our Jewish neighbors are under attack; we must stand in solidarity with them and unequivocally condemn anti-Semitism and bigotry in all its forms".

== Personal life ==
She lives in Durham with her husband, Towqir Aziz, and two dogs named Otis and Nala. She and Aziz met in a Muslim Sunday school. Allam is a member of the Women's Islamic Initiative in Spirituality & Equality. In April 2022, Allam announced that she was pregnant. Allam had also been pregnant in 2021, but had an abortion due to medical issues.

== Electoral history ==
2022 North Carolina's 4th congressional district Democratic primary
Party	Candidate	Votes	%
Democratic	Valerie Foushee	40,531	46.15
Democratic	Nida Allam	32,424	36.92
Democratic	Clay Aiken	6,469	7.37
Democratic	Ashley Ward	4,730	5.39
Democratic	Richard Watkins III	1,132	1.29
Democratic	Crystal Cavalier	1,104	1.26
Democratic	Stephen Valentine	1,004	1.14
Democratic	Matt Grooms	433	0.49
Total votes		87,827	100.0
