= Carla Cunningham =

American politician

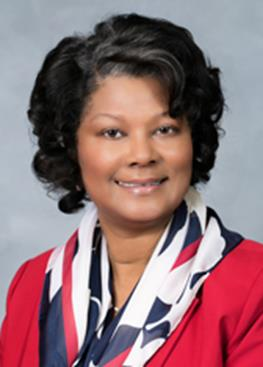

Member of the North Carolina House of Representatives from the 106th district
- Incumbent
- Assumed office January 1, 2013
- Preceded by: Martha B. Alexander

Personal details
- Born: January 12, 1962 (age 64) Wadesboro, North Carolina, U.S.
- Party: Democratic (before 2026); Independent (2026–present)
- Education: Central Piedmont Community College; Central Carolina Community College; Halifax Community College; Gaston College (AS); Winston-Salem State University (BS)

Carla D. Cunningham (born January 12, 1962) is an American politician. She has served as a member of the North Carolina House of Representatives from the 106th district since 2012. Cunningham was considered a conservative Democrat before she changed her affiliation to Independent after being defeated in the 2026 Democratic primary.

== Education, career and politics ==
She was born in Wadesboro, North Carolina, and graduated from Anson High School in 1980. She earned a diploma in nursing from Central Piedmont Community College in 1981, an associate's degree in nursing from Gaston College in 1996, and a bachelor's of science in nursing from Winston-Salem State University in 2009. She practiced nursing for more than 30 years.

In July 2025, Carla Cunningham notably crossed party lines, resulting in a 72–48 vote in the House overriding Democratic Governor Josh Stein veto of a bill that requires North Carolina sheriffs to work closer with Immigration and Customs Enforcement to support the mass deportations in the second presidency of Donald Trump. She declared, "All cultures are not equal. Some immigrants come and believe they can function in isolation, I suggest they must assimilate. Adapt to the country they want to live in." Cunningham also drew criticism from her Democratic colleagues for the perceived incendiary floor speech in which she accused immigrants of "destabilizing" communities. She was also a key vote on overriding the veto of two other bills opposed by the Governor and liberal Democrats in the legislature. Cunningham was known as a conservative Democrat.

She lost her reelection campaign in March 2026 to primary challenger Rodney Sadler.

== Electoral history ==
=== 2026 ===
North Carolina House of Representatives 106th district Democratic primary election, 2026
| Party | Candidate | Votes | % |
|---|---|---|---|
| Democratic | Rodney Sadler | 7,716 | 69.96% |
| Democratic | Carla Cunningham (incumbent) | 2,401 | 21.77% |
| Democratic | Vermanno Bowman | 912 | 8.27% |
| Total votes | | 11,029 | 100% |

=== 2024 ===
North Carolina House of Representatives 106th district Democratic primary election, 2024
| Party | Candidate | Votes | % |
|---|---|---|---|
| Democratic | Carla Cunningham (incumbent) | 6,209 | 84.56% |
| Democratic | Vermanno Bowman | 1,134 | 15.44% |
| Total votes | | 7,343 | 100% |

North Carolina House of Representatives 106th district general election, 2024
| Party | Candidate | Votes | % |
|---|---|---|---|
| Democratic | Carla Cunningham (incumbent) | 40,633 | 100% |
| Total votes | | 40,633 | 100% |
| Democratic hold | | | |

=== 2022 ===
North Carolina House of Representatives 106th district general election, 2022
| Party | Candidate | Votes | % |
|---|---|---|---|
| Democratic | Carla Cunningham (incumbent) | 20,559 | 70.14% |
| Republican | Karen Henning | 8,751 | 29.86% |
| Total votes | | 29,310 | 100% |
| Democratic hold | | | |

=== 2020 ===
North Carolina House of Representatives 106th district general election, 2020
| Party | Candidate | Votes | % |
|---|---|---|---|
| Democratic | Carla Cunningham (incumbent) | 34,510 | 100% |
| Total votes | | 34,510 | 100% |
| Democratic hold | | | |

=== 2018 ===
North Carolina House of Representatives 106th district Democratic primary election, 2018
| Party | Candidate | Votes | % |
|---|---|---|---|
| Democratic | Carla Cunningham (incumbent) | 4,036 | 88.88% |
| Democratic | Blanche Penn | 505 | 11.12% |
| Total votes | | 4,541 | 100% |

North Carolina House of Representatives 106th district general election, 2018
| Party | Candidate | Votes | % |
|---|---|---|---|
| Democratic | Carla Cunningham (incumbent) | 20,261 | 80.55% |
| Republican | Geovani Opry Sherow | 4,892 | 19.45% |
| Total votes | | 25,153 | 100% |
| Democratic hold | | | |

=== 2016 ===
North Carolina House of Representatives 106th district general election, 2016
| Party | Candidate | Votes | % |
|---|---|---|---|
| Democratic | Carla Cunningham (incumbent) | 27,247 | 100% |
| Total votes | | 27,247 | 100% |
| Democratic hold | | | |

=== 2014 ===
North Carolina House of Representatives 106th district general election, 2014
| Party | Candidate | Votes | % |
|---|---|---|---|
| Democratic | Carla Cunningham (incumbent) | 12,942 | 86.64% |
| Republican | Trey Lowe | 1,996 | 13.36% |
| Total votes | | 14,938 | 100% |
| Democratic hold | | | |

=== 2012 ===
North Carolina House of Representatives 106th district general election, 2012
| Party | Candidate | Votes | % |
|---|---|---|---|
| Democratic | Carla Cunningham | 26,577 | 100% |
| Total votes | | 26,577 | 100% |
| Democratic win (new seat) | | | |
