= Jonah Garson =

American politician

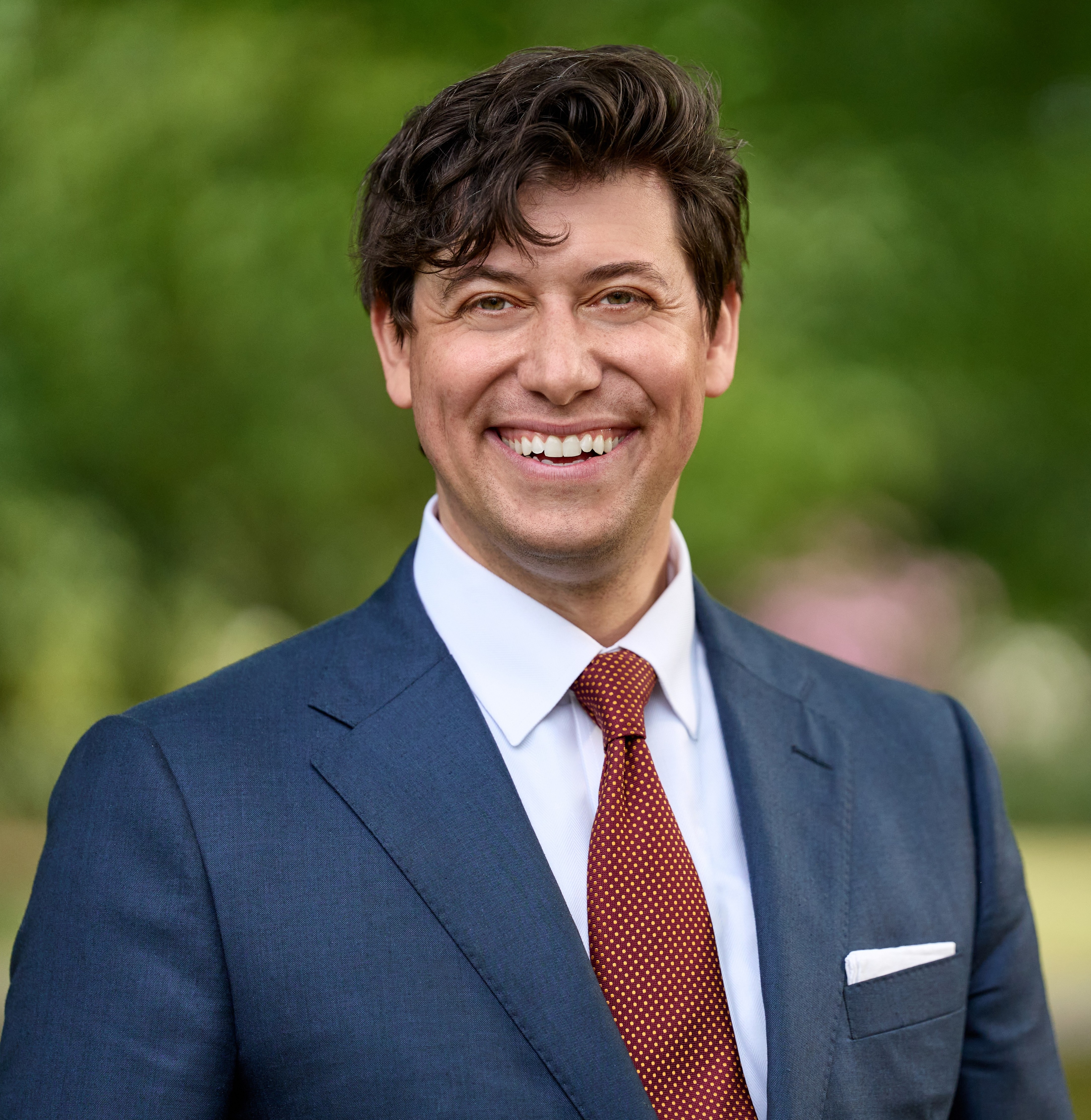

Member of the North Carolina Senate from the 23rd district
- Incumbent
- Assumed office April 10, 2026
- Preceded by: Graig Meyer

Personal details
- Born: 1986 or 1987 (age 39–40)
- Party: Democratic
- Education: University of North Carolina at Chapel Hill (BA); Columbia Law School (JD)
- Website: Legislature page

Jonah Garson (born 1986 or 1987) is an American attorney and politician serving as a member of the North Carolina Senate representing the 23rd district since April 2026. He was appointed to the role to succeed Graig Meyer, who resigned to become the executive director of the North Carolina Justice Center. Garson previously served as First-Vice Chair of the North Carolina Democratic Party from 2023 until May 2026.

== Early life and career ==
A native of Chapel Hill, North Carolina, Garson graduated from the University of North Carolina at Chapel Hill with a Bachelor of Arts in 2009 and Columbia Law School with a Juris Doctor in 2014. He worked at the Office of the New York State Attorney General then practiced law at multinational law firm Milbank LLP in New York City before joining Parry Law, PLLC in Chapel Hill.

In 2022, Garson ran to represent the 56th district of the North Carolina House of Representatives. He narrowly lost in the Democratic primary to Allen Buansi.

Garson served as First-Vice Chair of the North Carolina Democratic Party from February 2023 to May 2026. He defeated incumbent vice chair, former state senator Floyd McKissick, in a party vote that also ousted the sitting chair and second vice chair in favor of newcomers. Garson won re-election in February 2025. He resigned from the role on May 8, 2026, after he was sworn in to the North Carolina State Senate.

A day prior to the party's vote on whether to re-elect Garson to the role in February 2025, an anonymous email account made allegations that Garson had used cocaine at party events and linked a YouTube video of security footage of Garson being kicked out of a Chapel Hill bar in 2024.

== North Carolina Senate ==
In April 2026, Garson was appointed by six Democratic officials from Caswell, Orange, and Person counties to succeed Graig Meyer as a member of the North Carolina Senate representing the 23rd district. Three senators including Sophia Chitlik voiced concerns over his appointment to Indy Week, citing negative personal interactions, a 2024 incident when he was kicked out of a Chapel Hill bar, and the anonymous email sent in 2025 alleging Garson had used cocaine at party events. Garson stated he was removed from the bar after confronting staff for serving underage patrons and denied the allegations, and outgoing senator Graig Meyer stated "Anyone who is going to make libelous accusations like this without putting their actual name on it is a f***ing p***y [sic] and they deserve to be sued." He assumed office on April 10, 2026.

== Electoral history ==
North Carolina House of Representatives 56th district Democratic primary election, 2022
Party	Candidate	Votes	%
Democratic	Allen Buansi	7,715	51.54%
Democratic	Jonah Garson	7,253	48.46%
Total votes		14,968	100%
