= Verla C. Insko =

American politician (born 1936)

Verla Insko
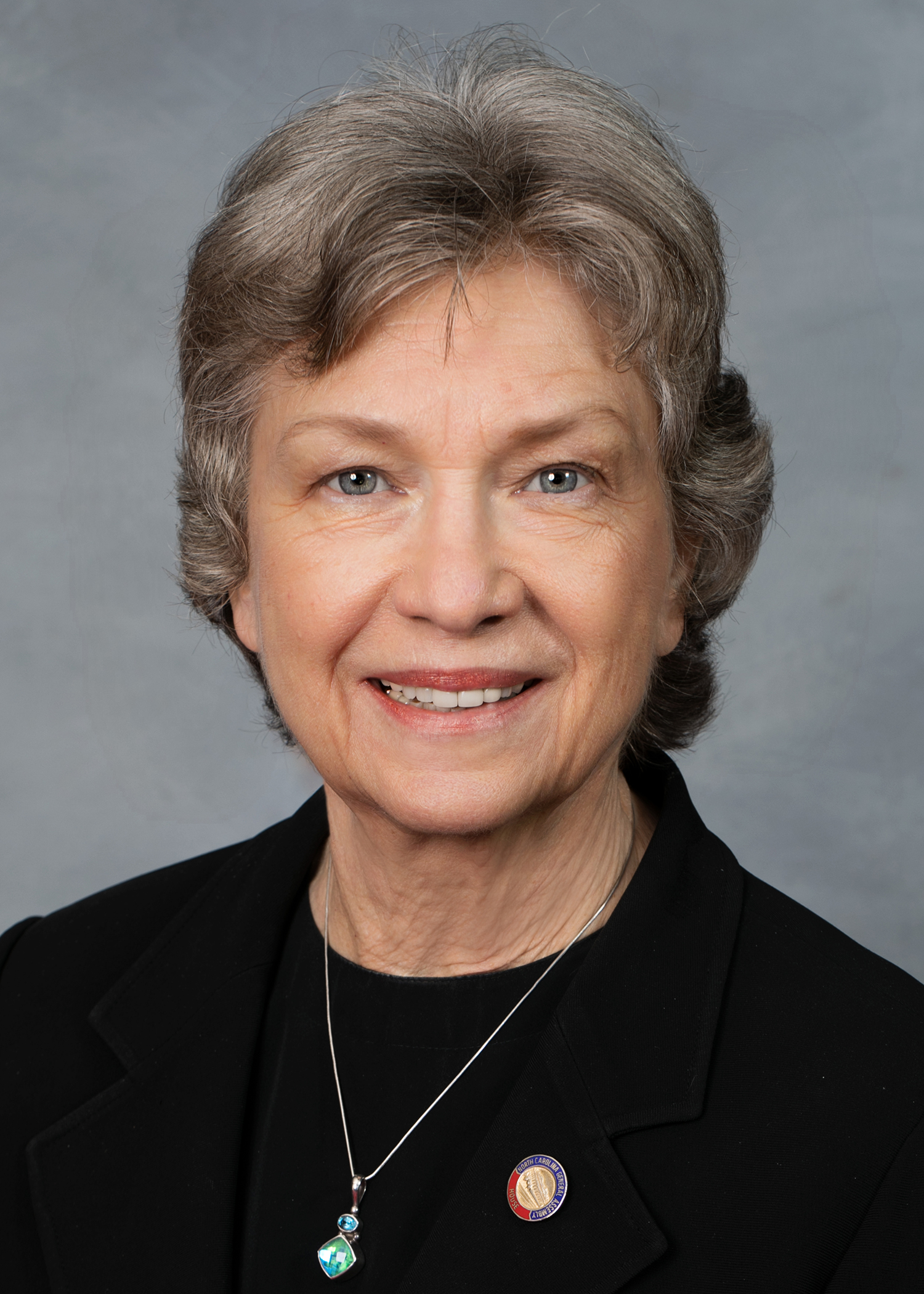
- Official portrait, 2017

Member of the North Carolina House of Representatives
- In office January 1, 1997 – May 31, 2022
- Preceded by: Anne Craig Barnes
- Succeeded by: Allen Buansi
- Constituency: 24th District (1997-2003); 56th District (2003-2022)

Personal details
- Born: February 5, 1936 (age 90) Decatur, Arkansas, U.S.
- Party: Democratic
- Spouse: Chester
- Children: 2
- Education: Fresno State College (BA); University of North Carolina at Chapel Hill (MPA)
- Occupation: Retired health program administrator
- Website: https://verlainsko.com/

Verla Clemens Insko (born February 5, 1936) is a Democratic former member of the North Carolina House of Representatives. Insko represented the 56th district (including constituents in Orange County) from 1997 to 2022. She is a retired health program administrator from Chapel Hill, North Carolina. Insko also previously served as a member of the Chapel Hill-Carrboro Board of Education from 1977 to 1985 and on the Orange County Board of Commissioners from 1990 to 1994. She has been noted for her progressive policy positions, such as her support for publicly funded universal health care, and stated in a candidate questionnaire, "I believe in an activist government that provides for the common good and protects the vulnerable". On September 15, 2021, Insko announced that she would not seek re-election to the NC House in 2022.

== Committee assignments ==
=== 2021-2022 session ===
- Appropriations
- Appropriations - Health and Human Services
- Health (Vice Chair)
- Education - Universities
- Election Law and Campaign Finance Reform
- Environment
- Ethics

=== 2019-2020 session ===
- Appropriations
- Appropriations - Health and Human Services
- Health
- Education - Universities
- Environment
- Ethics
- Homelessness, Foster Care, and Dependency

=== 2017-2018 session ===
- Appropriations
- Appropriations - Health and Human Services
- Health
- Education - Universities
- Homelessness, Foster Care, and Dependency
- Insurance

=== 2015-2016 session ===
- Appropriations
- Appropriations - Health and Human Services (Vice Chair)
- Health
- Education - Community Colleges
- Environment
- Insurance
- Judiciary III
- State Personnel

=== 2013-2014 session ===
- Appropriations
- Environment
- Health and Human Services
- Insurance
- Judiciary

=== 2011-2012 session ===
- Appropriations
- Environment
- Health and Human Services
- Insurance
- Judiciary

=== 2009-2010 session ===
- Appropriations
- Health
- Education
- Environment and Natural Resources
- Judiciary I
- Mental Health Reform
- Rules, Calendar, and Operations of the House

== Electoral history ==
=== 2020 ===
North Carolina House of Representatives 56th district Democratic primary election, 2020
Party	Candidate	Votes	%
Democratic	Verla Insko (incumbent)	20,389	85.64%
Democratic	Joe Parrish	3,418	14.36%
Total votes		23,807	100%

North Carolina House of Representatives 56th district general election, 2020
Party	Candidate	Votes	%
Democratic	Verla Insko (incumbent)	38,428	100%
Total votes		38,428	100%
Democratic hold			

=== 2018 ===
North Carolina House of Representatives 56th district general election, 2018
Party	Candidate	Votes	%
Democratic	Verla Insko (incumbent)	32,286	86.15%
Republican	Marcus Cooke	4,235	11.30%
Libertarian	Matthew P. Clements	955	2.55%
Total votes		37,476	100%
Democratic hold			

=== 2016 ===
North Carolina House of Representatives 56th district general election, 2016
Party	Candidate	Votes	%
Democratic	Verla Insko (incumbent)	43,144	100%
Total votes		43,144	100%
Democratic hold			

=== 2014 ===
North Carolina House of Representatives 56th district general election, 2014
Party	Candidate	Votes	%
Democratic	Verla Insko (incumbent)	25,601	81.19%
Republican	David (Dave) Pratt Carter	5,932	18.81%
Total votes		31,533	100%
Democratic hold			

=== 2012 ===
North Carolina House of Representatives 56th district general election, 2012
Party	Candidate	Votes	%
Democratic	Verla Insko (incumbent)	35,173	77.44%
Republican	Karrie Mead	10,248	22.56%
Total votes		45,421	100%
Democratic hold			

=== 2010 ===
North Carolina House of Representatives 56th district general election, 2010
Party	Candidate	Votes	%
Democratic	Verla Insko (incumbent)	17,737	100%
Total votes		17,737	100%
Democratic hold			

=== 2008 ===
North Carolina House of Representatives 56th district general election, 2008
Party	Candidate	Votes	%
Democratic	Verla Insko (incumbent)	30,835	100%
Total votes		30,835	100%
Democratic hold			

=== 2006 ===
North Carolina House of Representatives 56th district general election, 2006
Party	Candidate	Votes	%
Democratic	Verla Insko (incumbent)	14,472	100%
Total votes		14,472	100%
Democratic hold			

=== 2004 ===
North Carolina House of Representatives 56th district general election, 2004
Party	Candidate	Votes	%
Democratic	Verla Insko (incumbent)	25,984	100%
Total votes		25,984	100%
Democratic hold			

=== 2002 ===
North Carolina House of Representatives 56th district general election, 2002
Party	Candidate	Votes	%
Democratic	Verla Insko (incumbent)	15,805	79.98%
Libertarian	Will Shooter	3,957	20.02%
Total votes		19,762	100%
Democratic hold			

=== 2000 ===
North Carolina House of Representatives 24th district general election, 2000
Party	Candidate	Votes	%
Democratic	Joe Hackney (incumbent)	41,133	33.73%
Democratic	Verla Insko (incumbent)	38,944	31.93%
Republican	William Towne	19,928	16.34%
Republican	Rod Chaney	19,281	15.81%
Libertarian	John H. Bauman	2,672	2.19%
Total votes		121,958	100%
Democratic hold			
Democratic hold			

=== 1998 ===
North Carolina House of Representatives 24th district general election, 1998
Party	Candidate	Votes	%
Democratic	Joe Hackney (incumbent)	32,828	52.63%
Democratic	Verla Insko (incumbent)	29,549	47.37%
Total votes		62,377	100%
Democratic hold			
Democratic hold			

== Personal life ==
Insko's husband Chester ("Chet"), is a Professor Emeritus of Social Psychology at UNC Chapel Hill.

North Carolina House of Representatives
Preceded by Anne Craig Barnes	Member of the North Carolina House of Representatives from the 24th district 1997–2003; Served alongside: Joe Hackney	Succeeded by Jean Farmer-Butterfield
Preceded by Martha Alexander	Member of the North Carolina House of Representatives from the 56th district 2003–2022	Succeeded by Allen Buansi
