= North Carolina's 106th House district =

American legislative district

North Carolina's 106th State House of Representatives district
Representative
Carla Cunningham; I–Charlotte
- Demographics: 30% White; 49% Black; 11% Hispanic; 7% Asian; 2% Multiracial
- Population (2024): 86,761

North Carolina's 106th House district is one of 120 districts in the North Carolina House of Representatives. It has been represented by Democrat-turned-Independent Carla Cunningham since 2013.

== Geography ==
Since 2003, the district has included part of Mecklenburg County. The district overlaps with the 38th Senate district.

== List of members representing the district ==
Representative	Party	Dates	Notes	Counties
District created January 1, 2003.
Martha Alexander (Charlotte)	Democratic	January 1, 2003 – January 1, 2013	Redistricted from the 56th district and re-elected in 2002. Re-elected in 2004. Re-elected in 2006. Re-elected in 2008. Re-elected in 2010. Redistricted to the 88th district and lost re-election.	2003–Present; Part of Mecklenburg County.
Carla Cunningham (Charlotte)	Democratic	January 1, 2013 – April 24, 2026	Elected in 2012. Re-elected in 2014. Re-elected in 2016. Re-elected in 2018. Re-elected in 2020. Re-elected in 2022. Re-elected in 2024. Lost re-nomination.	2003–Present; Part of Mecklenburg County.
Carla Cunningham (Charlotte)	Independent	April 24, 2026 – present	Elected in 2012. Re-elected in 2014. Re-elected in 2016. Re-elected in 2018. Re-elected in 2020. Re-elected in 2022. Re-elected in 2024. Lost re-nomination.	2003–Present; Part of Mecklenburg County.

== Election results ==
=== 2026 ===
North Carolina House of Representatives 106th district Democratic primary election, 2026
Party	Candidate	Votes	%
Democratic	Rodney Sadler	7,727	69.95%
Democratic	Carla Cunningham (incumbent)	2,404	21.76%
Democratic	Vermanno Bowman	916	8.29%
Total votes		11,047	100%

North Carolina House of Representatives 106th district general election, 2026
Party	Candidate	Votes	%
Democratic	Rodney Sadler		100%
Total votes			100%
Democratic hold			

=== 2024 ===
North Carolina House of Representatives 106th district Democratic primary election, 2024
Party	Candidate	Votes	%
Democratic	Carla Cunningham (incumbent)	6,209	84.56%
Democratic	Vermanno Bowman	1,134	15.44%
Total votes		7,343	100%

North Carolina House of Representatives 106th district general election, 2024
Party	Candidate	Votes	%
Democratic	Carla Cunningham (incumbent)	40,633	100%
Total votes		40,633	100%
Democratic hold			

=== 2022 ===
North Carolina House of Representatives 106th district general election, 2022
Party	Candidate	Votes	%
Democratic	Carla Cunningham (incumbent)	20,559	70.14%
Republican	Karen Henning	8,751	29.86%
Total votes		29,310	100%
Democratic hold			

=== 2020 ===
North Carolina House of Representatives 106th district general election, 2020
Party	Candidate	Votes	%
Democratic	Carla Cunningham (incumbent)	34,510	100%
Total votes		34,510	100%
Democratic hold			

=== 2018 ===
North Carolina House of Representatives 106th district Democratic primary election, 2018
Party	Candidate	Votes	%
Democratic	Carla Cunningham (incumbent)	4,036	88.88%
Democratic	Blanche Penn	505	11.12%
Total votes		4,541	100%

North Carolina House of Representatives 106th district general election, 2018
Party	Candidate	Votes	%
Democratic	Carla Cunningham (incumbent)	20,261	80.55%
Republican	Geovani Opry Sherow	4,892	19.45%
Total votes		25,153	100%
Democratic hold			

=== 2016 ===
North Carolina House of Representatives 106th district general election, 2016
Party	Candidate	Votes	%
Democratic	Carla Cunningham (incumbent)	27,247	100%
Total votes		27,247	100%
Democratic hold			

=== 2014 ===
North Carolina House of Representatives 106th district general election, 2014
Party	Candidate	Votes	%
Democratic	Carla Cunningham (incumbent)	12,942	86.64%
Republican	Trey Lowe	1,996	13.36%
Total votes		14,938	100%
Democratic hold			

=== 2012 ===
North Carolina House of Representatives 106th district general election, 2012
Party	Candidate	Votes	%
Democratic	Carla Cunningham	26,577	100%
Total votes		26,577	100%
Democratic win (new seat)			

=== 2010 ===
North Carolina House of Representatives 106th district general election, 2010
Party	Candidate	Votes	%
Democratic	Martha Alexander (incumbent)	10,278	59.50%
Republican	Michael Cavallo	6,996	40.50%
Total votes		17,274	100%
Democratic hold			

=== 2008 ===
North Carolina House of Representatives 106th district general election, 2008
Party	Candidate	Votes	%
Democratic	Martha Alexander (incumbent)	23,422	100%
Total votes		23,422	100%
Democratic hold			

=== 2006 ===
North Carolina House of Representatives 106th district general election, 2006
Party	Candidate	Votes	%
Democratic	Martha Alexander (incumbent)	8,571	100%
Total votes		8,571	100%
Democratic hold			

=== 2004 ===
North Carolina House of Representatives 106th district general election, 2004
Party	Candidate	Votes	%
Democratic	Martha Alexander (incumbent)	17,452	100%
Total votes		17,452	100%
Democratic hold			

=== 2002 ===
North Carolina House of Representatives 106th district general election, 2002
Party	Candidate	Votes	%
Democratic	Martha Alexander (incumbent)	11,822	100%
Total votes		11,822	100%
Democratic hold			
