= Allen Buansi =

American politician from North Carolina

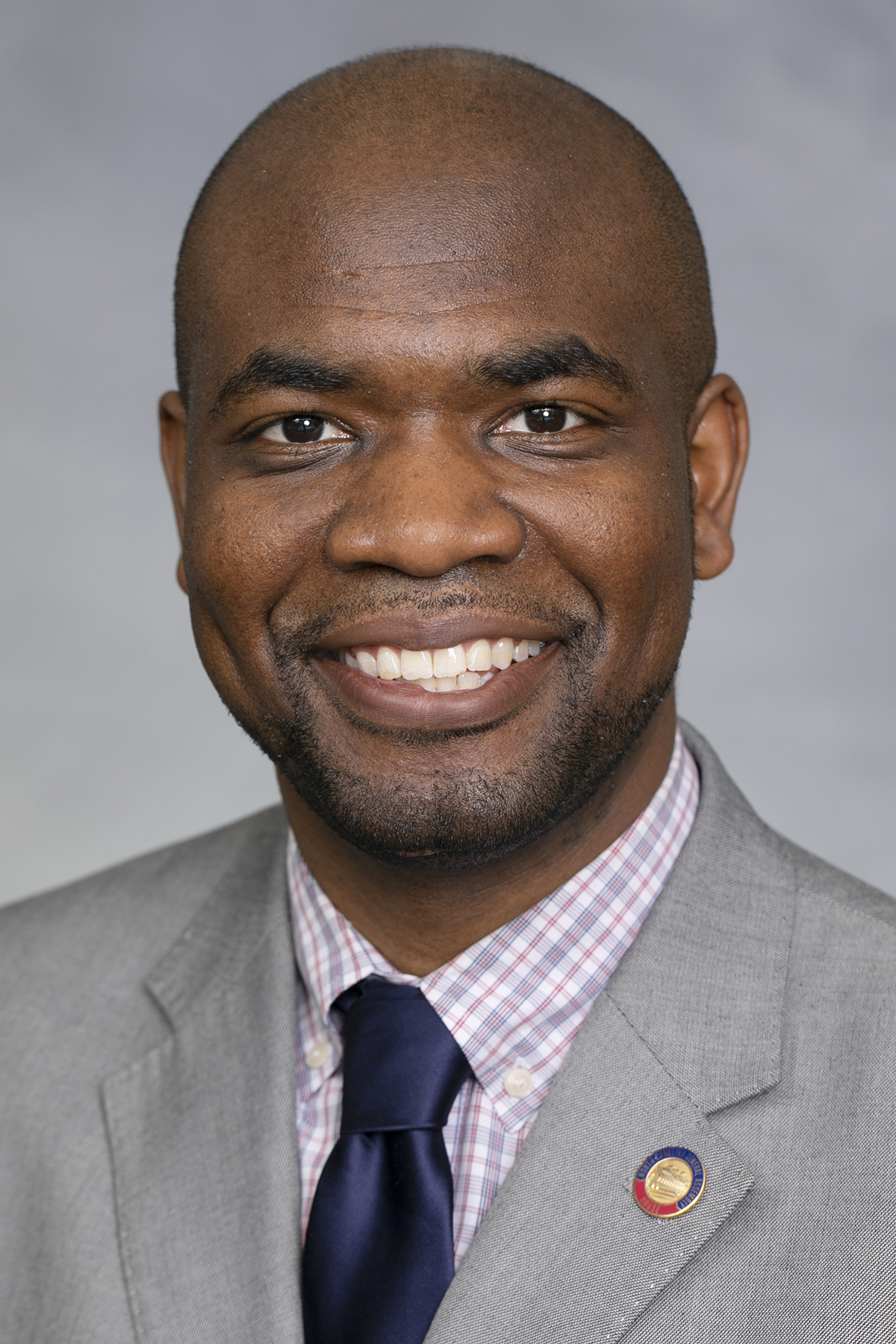
- Official portrait, 2023

Member of the North Carolina House of Representatives from the 56th district
- Incumbent
- Assumed office June 1, 2022
- Preceded by: Verla Insko

Personal details
- Born: Evanston, Illinois, U.S.
- Party: Democratic
- Education: Dartmouth College (BA); University of North Carolina, Chapel Hill (JD)

Allen Buansi is an American politician serving as a Democratic Party member representing the 56th district of the North Carolina House of Representatives.

== Early life ==
Buansi was born in Evanston, Illinois, and moved to North Carolina with his family at age of ten. His father is from Ghana. He attended Dartmouth College, where he earned his bachelor's degree in 2009. He then attended the University of North Carolina School of Law, where he earned his Juris Doctor degree in 2015.

== Political career ==
Buansi served on the Chapel Hill Town Council from 2017 to 2021.

In May 2022, Buansi narrowly won the Democratic primary for the 56th district of the North Carolina House of Representatives in a race to succeed retiring Verla Insko. With Buansi facing no general election challengers, Insko resigned from the legislature before the expiration of her term, allowing Buansi to be appointed to her seat and begin his service in the legislature on June 1, 2022.

== Electoral history ==
=== 2024 ===
North Carolina House of Representatives 56th district general election, 2024
Party	Candidate	Votes	%
Democratic	Allen Buansi	39,459	86.3%
Republican	Jeffrey Hoagland	6,267	13.7%
Total votes		45,726	100%

=== 2022 ===
North Carolina House of Representatives 56th district Democratic primary election, 2022
Party	Candidate	Votes	%
Democratic	Allen Buansi	7,715	51.54%
Democratic	Jonah Garson	7,253	48.46%
Total votes		14,968	100%

North Carolina House of Representatives
Preceded by Verla Insko	Member of the North Carolina House of Representatives from the 56th district 2022-Present	Incumbent
