= Martha B. Alexander =

American politician (born 1939)

Member of the North Carolina House of Representatives
- In office January 1, 1993 – January 1, 2013
- Preceded by: Jo Graham Foster
- Succeeded by: Rob Bryan (Redistricting)
- Constituency: 56th District (1993-2003); 106th District (2003-2013)

Personal details
- Born: Martha Bedell; August 30, 1939 (age 86) Jacksonville, Florida, U.S.
- Party: Democratic
- Spouse: James Frost Alexander
- Children: 2
- Occupation: Homemaker

Martha Bedell Alexander (born August 30, 1939) is a former Democratic member of the North Carolina General Assembly. She represented the state's one hundred sixth House district that included constituents in Mecklenburg county. A homemaker from Charlotte, North Carolina, Alexander served ten terms in the NC House from 1993 to 2013. After redistricting, she lost re-election to her seat in 2012.

== Early life and education ==
Alexander was born in Jacksonville, Florida. Her parents were Chester Bedell and the former Edmonia Hair. She graduated from Robert E. Lee High School in Jacksonville and from there went on to receive a B.S. in Education from Florida State University in 1961. She was a member of the school's chapter of Alpha Delta Pi. Later, in 1979, Alexander attained her Masters of Human Development and Learning from the University of North Carolina at Charlotte.

== Personal life ==
Alexander was married to James Frost Alexander. They have two children. An Episcopalian, Alexander is a lay deputy from North Carolina of The General Convention of the Episcopal Church. She is a trustee of the Church Pension Fund and, in 2012, sought election to the presidency of the House of Deputies.

Prior to being elected to office, Alexander was a Chaplain's assistant at Presbyterian Hospital in Charlotte as well as the executive director of the Charlotte Council on Alcoholism and Chemical Dependency. Earlier in her career, she was also an assistant librarian at a high school in Montreal, Quebec, Canada.

== Electoral history ==
Alexander was first elected to the 56th district of the North Carolina House of Representatives in 1992. In 1996, she only faced Natural Law Party candidate Marguerite King in the general election. Alexander won 92.56%–7.44%. In 1998 and 2000, she faced no primary or general election opposition. After the 2002 redistricting, her seat became the 106th district, but she again faced no opposition in either the primary or general elections between 2002 and 2008.

In 2010, Alexander faced her first challenger in over a decade when Republican sales manager Michael Cavallo ran against her. She defeated Cavallo in the general election 59.50% to 40.50%.

After redistricting in 2012, Alexander's district was made more heavily Republican and changed to become the 88th NC House district. She did not face any primary challengers, but the race was heavily targeted by conservative groups and her opponent in the general election, Republican lawyer and county party chairman Rob Bryan out-raised $287,000 to $35,000. Bryan defeated Alexander in the general election, 54.95%–45.05%.

== Legislative history ==
While in office, Alexander served as chairperson of the Appropriations Committee in the state House and was vice-chair of the Mental Health Reform Committee.

== Awards and honors ==
In 1993, Alexander was chosen the Woman of the Year by The Charlotte Observer. Ten years later, in 2003, she was awarded the Mary Harriman Community Leadership Award by The Association of Junior Leagues International, Inc. Also, the American Psychological Association Practice Organization honored her with their State Legislator of the Year Award for 2009.

North Carolina House of Representatives
Preceded by Jo Graham Foster	Member of the North Carolina House of Representatives from the 56th district 1993–2003	Succeeded by Verla Insko
Preceded by Constituency established	Member of the North Carolina House of Representatives from the 106th district 2003–2013	Succeeded by Carla Cunningham
