= Red-boxing =

American political strategy

Red-boxing is a tactic used by American political candidates to coordinate with political action committees (PACs), which they are legally prohibited from privately coordinating with due to campaign finance laws. Political campaigns place statements or requests on public campaign websites which are then used by PACs to support the candidate. The name for the practice comes from the red-colored box that often surrounds the instructions for PACs on campaign websites. It is used by both major American parties.

Campaigns will use boxes to focus PACs' attention on certain aspects of opposing candidates' biographies, including past controversies. They often include detailed instructions on what type of ad to use, what areas to target, and what age, gender, or ethnicity to appeal to. Red boxes are most often located in the "Media Resources" or "Media Center" sections of a campaign website where political operatives know to look. Instructions sometimes use terms like "hear" for radio ad requests, "read" for direct mail, "see" for television, and "see while on the go" for digital ads.

== History ==
In a Yale Law Journal article, Kaveri Sharma traced the origin of red-boxing to shortly after the United States Supreme Court decided Citizens United v. Federal Election Commission in 2010. This decision led to a huge increase in political action committees (PACs) and overall independent campaign expenditures. Under United States campaign finance laws, candidates and their campaigns are legally prohibited from privately coordinating with independent expenditure groups, which includes PACs.

Initially, campaigns would put "top hits" against opponents on their websites in the hope that they would be used by PACs, but this proved to be too subtle to be effective. After the election cycle, campaign operatives, PAC employees and party staff gathered to improve the way in which information was exchanged, settling on red boxes. Because staff regularly switched between working for campaigns, PACs and party organizations, the information was easily disseminated and the practice developed and became an open secret. Messaging has been refined after each election cycle in order for the process to be even more effective.

Sharma proposes several "magic signals" to help to define red-boxing, acting much like the "eight magic words" used to define express advocacy. These signals are:

- The colored box (which is not necessarily red) used to highlight information for PACs.
- The phrase "voters need to know" or a state-specific equivalent such as "all Montanans need to know".
- The use of party-controlled microsites which have been specifically made for PACs to be able to find redboxes for many candidates in a short amount of time. The Democratic Congressional Campaign Committee, the National Republican Congressional Committee, and the National Republican Senatorial Committee all operated redbox microsites.
- The inclusion of targeting information which indicates an advertisement's intended audience, timing and means of communication. This is noted to be showing that redbox information is meant for PACs rather than for voters or the general public.
- The inclusion of "back-up" documents to provide verification of redbox claims and production elements (like photos, audio or video footage) to help PACs produce the desired adverts.

== Instances of use ==
A 2022 New York Times survey found that at least 19 Democrats running in four states holding contested congressional primaries on May 16, 2022, had used some kind of redboxing. A 2026 NOTUS report similarly found more than a dozen Democratic candidates used redboxes.

Republican candidates did not rely on redboxing as much, largely using other tactics to communicate with PACs. In 2026, the National Republican Congressional Committee maintained a redboxing page, and red box pages were used by Republican candidates in key races.

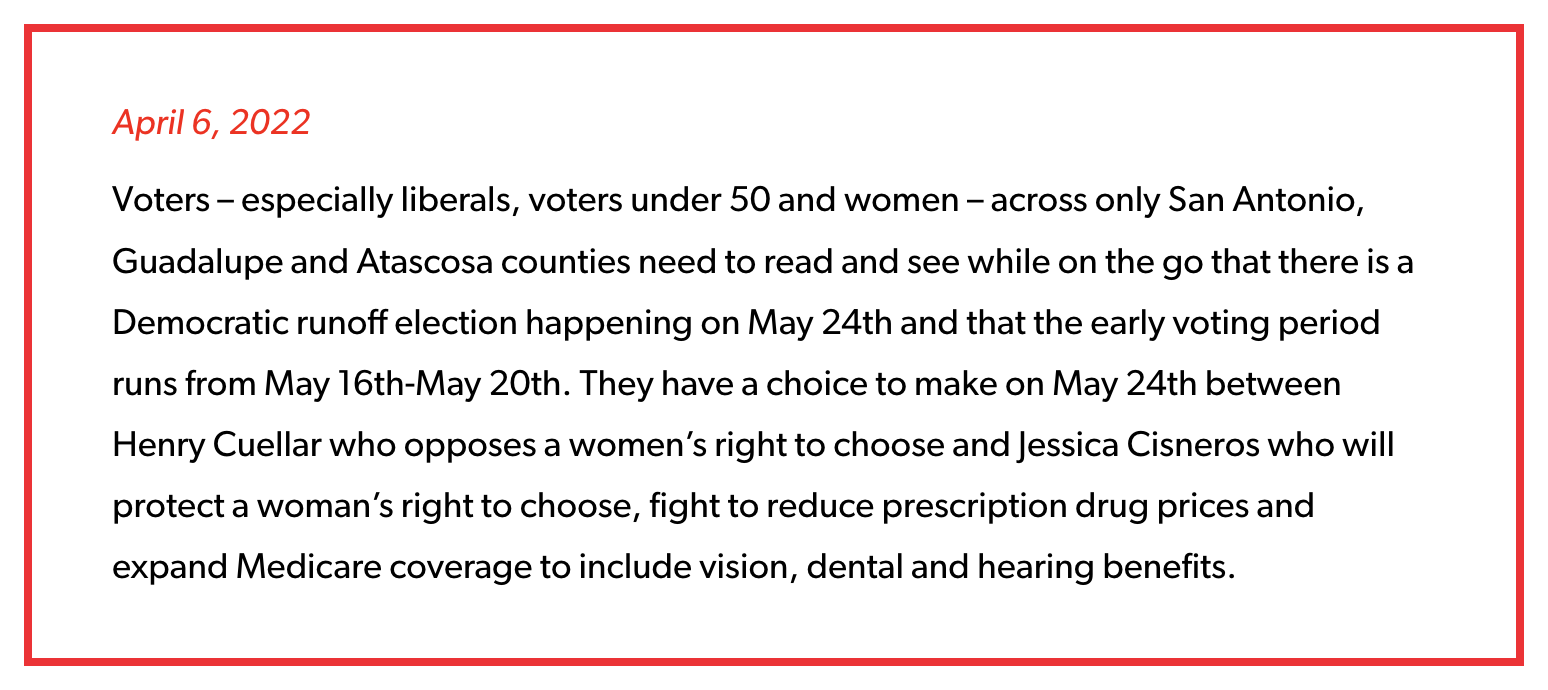
Red-boxing in Jessica Cisneros' 2022 campaign

- Jeanne Shaheen (D), running in the 2014 United States Senate election in New Hampshire.
- Patrick Murphy (D), running in the 2016 United States Senate election in Florida.
- Matt Rosendale (R), running in the 2018 United States Senate election in Montana.
- Jon Tester (D), running in the 2018 United States Senate election in Montana. Used to prompt adverts by VoteVets and Majority Forward.
- Karen Carter Peterson (D), running in the 2021 Louisiana's 2nd congressional district special election.
- Eric Adams (D), running in the 2021 New York City mayoral election.
- Shontel Brown (D), running in Ohio's 11th congressional district special election in 2021.
- Patrick Branco (D), running in the 2022 United States House of Representatives elections in Hawaii.
- Clay Aiken (D), running in the 2022 United States House of Representatives elections in North Carolina.
- Nida Allam (D), running in the 2022 United States House of Representatives elections in North Carolina. On April 20, a red box on Allam's website requested online advertisements targeting "especially women, Democrats under 50 and progressives" that she would "be an unapologetic progressive." On May 5, the exact words from the red box were used by the Working Families Party in a Facebook ad. According to Facebook records as detailed in The New York Times, "95 percent of the ad's impressions were with women and people under 54."
- Valerie Foushee (D), running in the 2022 United States House of Representatives elections in North Carolina. The red box on Foushee's website asked for advertising to be directed toward "Black voters ages 45+ in Durham and white women ages 45+ in Orange".
- Jessica Cisneros (D), running in the 2022 United States House of Representatives elections in Texas. The red box on Cisneros website asked for advertising to be directed toward "Liberals, voters under 50 and women—across only San Antonio, Guadalupe and Atascosa counties".
- Henry Cuellar (D), running in the 2022 United States House of Representatives elections in Texas.
- Kurt Schrader (D), running in the 2022 United States House of Representatives elections in Oregon. On April 29, 2022, a red box on Schrader's website, was published with what The New York Times called a "three-pronged takedown" of Jamie McLeod-Skinner, who he called his "toxic challenger". The box included a link to a two-page, opposition-research document about McLeod-Skinner's time as a city manager. On May 3, a super PAC funded by a pharmaceutical industry dark money group ran television ads using the exact three lines Schrader had published in the red box.
- Carrick Flynn (D), running in the 2022 United States House of Representatives elections in Oregon.
- Jamie McLeod-Skinner (D), running in the 2022 United States House of Representatives elections in Oregon.
- Becca Balint (D), running in the 2022 United States House of Representatives election in Vermont.
- John Fetterman (D), running in the 2022 United States Senate election in Pennsylvania. On a website made by Fetterman's campaign, a page acting as a red box making suggestions to super PACs stated "This page only exists because of our broken campaign finance system." The website asked for only positive ads, which a super PAC followed suit with.
- Conor Lamb (D), running in the 2022 United States Senate election in Pennsylvania. A red box on Lamb's website outlined attacks against Fetterman that he would like his super PAC to run. A television ad later ran which claimed Fetterman had been called a "Silver Spoon Socialist" and "Republicans think they could crush" him.
- JD Vance (R), running in the 2022 United States Senate election in Ohio. Vance's super PAC, which was funded with $15 million from Peter Thiel, used an unpublicized Medium page to post a large amount of internal and polling data that members of the Vance campaign consulted.

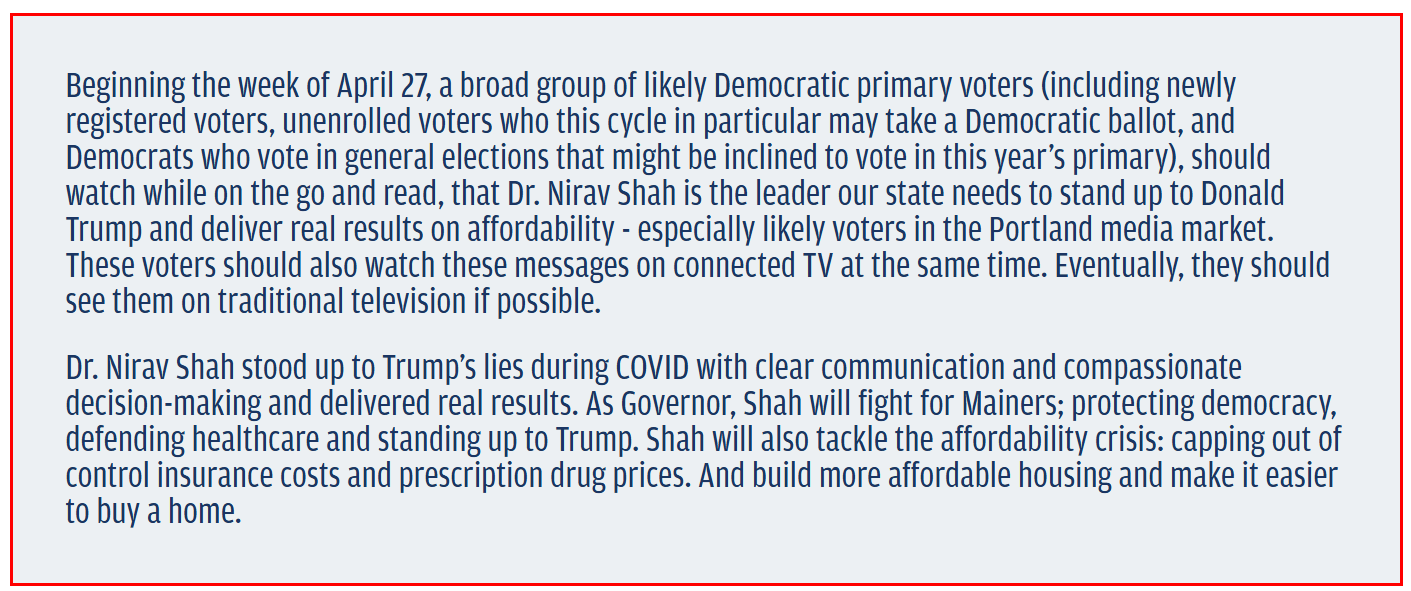
Red-boxing in Nirav D. Shah's 2026 gubernatorial campaign

- Joe Dunne, running in the 2023 Chicago City Council election.
- Gilbert Villegas, running in the 2023 Chicago City Council election.
- Kim Walz, running in the 2023 Chicago City Council election.
- Sara Innamorato (D), running in the 2023 Allegheny County Executive election.
- Sabina Matos (D), running in the 2023 Rhode Island 1st congressional district special election.
- Aaron Regunberg (D), running in the 2023 Rhode Island 1st congressional district special election.
- Andrew Cuomo (D), running in the 2025 New York City mayoral election. Cuomo's redboxing prompted a warning from the New York City Campaign Finance Board, which had passed stricter rules around illegal coordination in November 2024, and a complaint from Zellnor Myrie, another candidate running in the election's Democratic primary.
- Nirav D. Shah (D), running in the 2026 Maine gubernatorial election.
- Troy Jackson (D), running in the 2026 Maine gubernatorial election.
- Hannah Pingree (D), running in the 2026 Maine gubernatorial election.
- Marni von Wilpert (D), Ammar Campa-Najjar (D), and Brandon Riker (D), all running in the 2026 United States House of Representatives election in California's 48th Congressional District
- Xavier Becerra (D) running in the 2026 California gubernatorial election.

== Response ==
According to Adav Noti, the legal director of campaign finance watchdog group the Campaign Legal Center, "The coordination of super PACs and candidates is the primary mechanism for corruption of federal campaigns in 2022."

=== Legality ===
==== Federal level ====
Federal law does not explicitly ban red-boxing, but coordination between candidates and super PACs is prohibited. In a 2022 article in the American Bar Association's Human Rights Magazine, Paul M. Smith and Saurav Ghosh said that red-boxing and using "coded instructions" to direct the actions of super PACs amounted to "illegal coordination".

However, the Federal Election Commission has repeatedly held that "redbox" requests that are publicly available to a general audience do not count at illegal coordination. Complaints about illegal coordination between political campaigns and PACs involving public material posted online submitted to the Federal Election Commission have not resulted in any action. In 2020, the Foundation for Accountability and Civic Trust made a complaint to the FEC against John Hickenlooper's 2020 Senate campaign alleging coordination between the Hickenlooper campaign and Senate Majority PAC, who used video footage from a previous Hickenlooper advert and talking points from Hickenlooper's campaign website to make an advert supportive of his campaign. The FEC's general counsel recommended that the FEC investigate the re-use of video footage but not the alleged coordination. In November 2022, the FEC dismissed the complaints using prosecutorial discretion.

==== State level ====
In August 2022, The Philadelphia Inquirer reported that the Philadelphia Board of Ethics was considering an amendment to the city's campaign finance regulations which would explicitly ban red-boxing. Opponents of the amendment argued that its wording was too broad, and would also cover normal campaign messaging. The Board voted unanimously to approve the motion once it was amended to be more specific.

Hawaii Senate Bill 1212 which prohibited red-boxing under the state's campaign law was passed on January 25, 2023, but was amended in the committee stage so that it does not take effect until March 22, 2075.
