= Protect Our Future =

Democratic political action committee

Protect Our Future (POF) was a 2022 super PAC focused on pandemic prevention. It was funded primarily by Sam Bankman-Fried, and spent $24 million in Democratic primaries.

== Funding ==
In 2022 Bankman-Fried provided initial financial support for Protect Our Future PAC. Protect Our Future was launched as a Democratic political action committee with $10 million in initial funding aiming to support "lawmakers who play the long game on policymaking in areas like pandemic preparedness and planning", according to Politico. Bankman-Fried had provided the majority of the $14 million raised by May 2022 for the PAC. A spokesperson for the PAC said Bankman-Fried had donated $13 million, while Nishad Singh had donated $1 million.

As of June 2022, Bankman-Fried contributed over $23 million to the PAC.

== 2022 Democratic primary ==
POF spent funds in several 2022 Democratic primaries. In the 2022 Democratic primary between Shontel Brown and Nina Turner, POF spent at least $1 million in support of Brown, largely on radio, TV, and digital ads. This amount was significant, given that the Brown campaign itself raised $4 million. POF spent at least $2 million for Georgia Representative Lucy McBath.

POF spent at least $7 million in the 2022 Carrick Flynn campaign for Oregon district 6 Representative. An opposing candidate alleged that POF coordinated with a Flynn campaign, an action illegal under federal law. POF denied this allegation. The Flynn campaign may have coordinated with POF through a strategy called red-boxing, whereby the campaign highlights particular language on its website in a red box that POF replicated in its advertising.
