= North Carolina's 23rd Senate district =

American legislative district

North Carolina's 23rd State Senate district
Senator
Jonah Garson; D–Chapel Hill
- Demographics: 65% White; 15% Black; 9% Hispanic; 6% Asian; 4% Multiracial
- Population (2024): 211,624

North Carolina's 23rd Senate district is one of 50 districts in the North Carolina Senate. It has been represented by Democrat Jonah Garson since his appointment in 2026.

== Geography ==
Since 2023, the district has included all of Orange, Caswell, and Person counties. The district overlaps with the 2nd, 50th, and 56th state house districts.

== District officeholders ==
=== Single-member district ===
Senator	Party	Dates	Notes	Counties
C. U. Parrish (Salisbury)	Republican	January 1, 1967 – January 1, 1969		1967–1973; All of Rowan County.
C. Odell Sapp (Salisbury)	Republican	January 1, 1969 – January 1, 1971		1967–1973; All of Rowan County.
Phillip Kirk Jr. (Salisbury)	Republican	January 1, 1971 – January 1, 1973		1967–1973; All of Rowan County.

=== Multi-member district ===
Senator	Party	Dates	Notes	Senator	Party	Dates	Notes	Counties
Kennedy Sharpe (Hiddenite)	Republican	January 1, 1973 – January 1, 1975		J. Reid Poovey (Hickory)	Republican	January 1, 1973 – January 1, 1975		1973–1983; All of Alexander, Catawba, Iredell, and Yadkin counties.
Pleas Lackey (Hiddenite)	Democratic	January 1, 1975 – January 1, 1977		Bobby Lee Combs (Hickory)	Democratic	January 1, 1975 – January 1, 1979		1973–1983; All of Alexander, Catawba, Iredell, and Yadkin counties.
Cass Ballenger (Hickory)	Republican	January 1, 1977 – January 1, 1983	Redistricted to the 26th district.	Bobby Lee Combs (Hickory)	Democratic	January 1, 1975 – January 1, 1979		1973–1983; All of Alexander, Catawba, Iredell, and Yadkin counties.
Cass Ballenger (Hickory)	Republican	January 1, 1977 – January 1, 1983	Redistricted to the 26th district.	William Redman Jr. (Statesville)	Republican	January 1, 1979 – January 1, 1983	Redistricted to the 26th district.	1973–1983; All of Alexander, Catawba, Iredell, and Yadkin counties.
Robert Davis (Salisbury)	Democratic	January 1, 1983 – January 1, 1985		Jack Childers (Lexington)	Democratic	January 1, 1983 – January 1, 1985		1983–1993; All of Rowan, Davie, and Davidson counties.
Paul Sanders Smith (Salisbury)	Republican	January 1, 1985 – January 1, 1993	Redistricted to the single-member district.	Robert Somers (Salisbury)	Republican	January 1, 1985 – January 1, 1989		1983–1993; All of Rowan, Davie, and Davidson counties.
Paul Sanders Smith (Salisbury)	Republican	January 1, 1985 – January 1, 1993	Redistricted to the single-member district.	Betsy Lane Cochrane (Advance)	Republican	January 1, 1989 – January 1, 1993	Redistricted to the 38th district.	1983–1993; All of Rowan, Davie, and Davidson counties.

=== Single-member district ===
Senator	Party	Dates	Notes	Counties
Paul Sanders Smith (Salisbury)	Republican	January 1, 1993 – January 1, 1997	Redistricted from the multi-member district. Retired.	1993–2003; Parts of Iredell, Rowan, and Davidson counties.
Jim Phillips Sr. (Lexington)	Democratic	January 1, 1997 – January 1, 2001	Retired.	1993–2003; Parts of Iredell, Rowan, and Davidson counties.
Cal Cunningham (Lexington)	Democratic	January 1, 2001 – January 1, 2003	Redistricted to the 33rd district and retired.	1993–2003; Parts of Iredell, Rowan, and Davidson counties.
Eleanor Kinnaird (Chapel Hill)	Democratic	January 1, 2003 – August 19, 2013	Redistricted from the 16th district. Resigned.	2003–2005; All of Orange and Chatham counties.
Eleanor Kinnaird (Chapel Hill)	Democratic	January 1, 2003 – August 19, 2013	Redistricted from the 16th district. Resigned.	2005–2013; All of Orange and Person counties.
Eleanor Kinnaird (Chapel Hill)	Democratic	January 1, 2003 – August 19, 2013	Redistricted from the 16th district. Resigned.	2013–2023; All of Orange and Chatham counties.
Vacant		August 19, 2013 – September 13, 2013		2013–2023; All of Orange and Chatham counties.
Valerie Foushee (Chapel Hill)	Democratic	September 13, 2013 – January 1, 2023	Appointed to finish Kinnaird's term. Retired to run for Congress.	2013–2023; All of Orange and Chatham counties.
Graig Meyer (Chapel Hill)	Democratic	January 1, 2023 – March 31, 2026	Resigned to become executive director of the North Carolina Justice Center.	2023–Present; All of Orange, Caswell, and Person counties.
Vacant		March 31, 2026 – April 10, 2026		2023–Present; All of Orange, Caswell, and Person counties.
Jonah Garson (Chapel Hill)	Democratic	April 10, 2026 – Present	Appointed to finish Meyer's term.	2023–Present; All of Orange, Caswell, and Person counties.

== Election results ==
=== 2026 ===
North Carolina Senate 23rd district general election, 2026
Party	Candidate	Votes	%
Democratic	Jonah Garson (incumbent)		
Republican	Laura Pichardo		
Total votes			100%

=== 2024 ===
North Carolina Senate 23rd district general election, 2024
Party	Candidate	Votes	%
Democratic	Graig Meyer (incumbent)	77,146	65.85%
Republican	Laura Pichardo	40,011	34.15%
Total votes		117,157	100%
Democratic hold			

=== 2022 ===
North Carolina Senate 23rd district Democratic primary election, 2022
Party	Candidate	Votes	%
Democratic	Graig Meyer	23,717	82.38%
Democratic	Jamie DeMent Holcomb	5,072	17.62%
Total votes		28,789	100%

North Carolina Senate 23rd district Republican primary election, 2022
Party	Candidate	Votes	%
Republican	Landon Woods	5,798	58.29%
Republican	Bill Cooke	4,149	41.71%
Total votes		9,947	100%

North Carolina Senate 23rd district general election, 2022
Party	Candidate	Votes	%
Democratic	Graig Meyer	59,973	67.30%
Republican	Landon Woods	29,140	32.70%
Total votes		89,113	100%
Democratic hold			

=== 2020 ===
North Carolina Senate 23rd district general election, 2020
Party	Candidate	Votes	%
Democratic	Valerie Foushee (incumbent)	88,429	68.31%
Republican	Tom Glendinning	41,016	31.69%
Total votes		129,445	100%
Democratic hold			

=== 2018 ===
North Carolina Senate 23rd district general election, 2018
Party	Candidate	Votes	%
Democratic	Valerie Foushee (incumbent)	73,332	71.29%
Republican	Tom Glendinning	29,530	28.71%
Total votes		102,862	100%
Democratic hold			

=== 2016 ===
North Carolina Senate 23rd district general election, 2016
Party	Candidate	Votes	%
Democratic	Valerie Foushee (incumbent)	79,520	68.06%
Republican	Mary Lopez Carter	37,322	31.94%
Total votes		116,842	100%
Democratic hold			

=== 2014 ===
North Carolina Senate 23rd district general election, 2014
Party	Candidate	Votes	%
Democratic	Valerie Foushee (incumbent)	53,652	68.20%
Republican	Mary Lopez-Carter	25,021	31.80%
Total votes		78,673	100%
Democratic hold			

=== 2012 ===
North Carolina Senate 23rd district general election, 2012
Party	Candidate	Votes	%
Democratic	Eleanor Kinnaird (incumbent)	71,919	66.97%
Republican	Dave Carter	35,467	33.03%
Total votes		107,386	100%
Democratic hold			

=== 2010 ===
North Carolina Senate 23rd district Republican primary election, 2010
Party	Candidate	Votes	%
Republican	Ryan A. Hilliard	2,249	76.39%
Republican	Jon Greg Bass	695	23.61%
Total votes		2,944	100%

North Carolina Senate 23rd district general election, 2010
Party	Candidate	Votes	%
Democratic	Eleanor Kinnaird (incumbent)	36,611	64.87%
Republican	Ryan A. Hilliard	19,828	35.13%
Total votes		56,439	100%
Democratic hold			

=== 2008 ===
North Carolina Senate 23rd district Democratic primary election, 2008
Party	Candidate	Votes	%
Democratic	Eleanor Kinnaird (incumbent)	27,172	64.28%
Democratic	Moses Carey Jr.	15,099	35.72%
Total votes		42,271	100%

North Carolina Senate 23rd district general election, 2008
Party	Candidate	Votes	%
Democratic	Eleanor Kinnaird (incumbent)	62,192	70.90%
Republican	Greg Bass	25,527	29.10%
Total votes		62,192	100%
Democratic hold			

=== 2006 ===
North Carolina Senate 23rd district general election, 2006
Party	Candidate	Votes	%
Democratic	Eleanor Kinnaird (incumbent)	31,947	73.70%
Republican	E. B. Alston	11,400	26.30%
Total votes		43,347	100%
Democratic hold			

=== 2004 ===
North Carolina Senate 23rd district general election, 2004
Party	Candidate	Votes	%
Democratic	Eleanor Kinnaird (incumbent)	49,730	65.40%
Republican	Robert E. "Whit" Whitfield	26,307	34.60%
Total votes		76,037	100%
Democratic hold			

=== 2002 ===
North Carolina Senate 23rd district Democratic primary election, 2002
Party	Candidate	Votes	%
Democratic	Eleanor Kinnaird (incumbent)	12,488	50.24%
Democratic	Howard Lee (incumbent)	12,369	49.76%
Total votes		24,857	100%

North Carolina Senate 23rd district general election, 2002
Party	Candidate	Votes	%
Democratic	Eleanor Kinnaird (incumbent)	37,481	65.74%
Republican	Peter Morcombe	17,686	31.02%
Libertarian	Christopher Todd Goss	1,847	3.24%
Total votes		57,014	100%
Democratic hold			

=== 2000 ===
North Carolina Senate 23rd district Republican primary election, 2000
Party	Candidate	Votes	%
Republican	John "Scott" Keadle	3,007	49.99%
Republican	Patricia P. "Peaches" Rickard	1,810	30.09%
Republican	Sharon Hege Everhart	1,198	19.92%
Total votes		6,015	100%

North Carolina Senate 23rd district general election, 2000
Party	Candidate	Votes	%
Democratic	Cal Cunningham	27,726	53.37%
Republican	John "Scott" Keadle	23,095	44.45%
Libertarian	Lawrence James Clark	1,131	2.18%
Total votes		51,952	100%
Democratic hold			
