= 2002 North Carolina Senate election =

- November 5, 2002

All 50 seats in the North Carolina Senate 26 (without Lieutenant Governor) seats needed for a majority
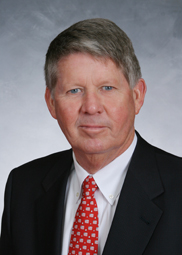

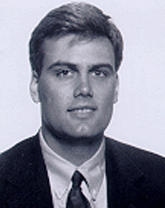
	Majority party	Minority party
Leader	Marc Basnight	Patrick J. Ballantine
Party	Democratic	Republican
Leader since	January 1, 1993	January 1, 1999
Leader's seat	1st - Manteo	9th - Wilmington
Last election	35	15
Seats won	28	22
Seat change	▼7	▲7
Popular vote	1,022,552	1,109,755
Percentage	46.77%	50.76%
- Results: Republican gain Democratic hold Republican hold
President pro tempore before election
Marc Basnight
Democratic
Elected President pro tempore
Marc Basnight
Democratic

The 2002 North Carolina Senate election was held on November 5, 2002, as part of the state's biennial election to the General Assembly. All fifty seats in the North Carolina Senate were elected.

== Results summary ==
District	Incumbent	Party	Elected	Party
1st	Marc Basnight	Dem	Marc Basnight	Dem
2nd	Scott Thomas (Note: Redistricted from the 3rd district.)	Dem	Scott Thomas	Dem
3rd	Edward Warren (Note: Redistricted from the 9th district.)	Dem	Clark Jenkins	Dem
3rd	R. L. "Bob" Martin (Note: Redistricted from the 6th district.)	Dem	Clark Jenkins	Dem
4th	Frank Ballance (Note: Redistricted from the 2nd district.)	Dem	Robert Lee Holloman	Dem
5th	New seat		Tony P. Moore	Dem
6th	New seat		Cecil Hargett	Dem
7th	John Kerr (Note: Redistricted from the 8th district.)	Dem	John Kerr	Dem
8th	R. C. Soles Jr. (Note: Redistricted from the 18th district.)	Dem	R. C. Soles Jr.	Dem
9th	Patrick J. Ballantine (Note: Redistricted from the 4th district.)	Rep	Patrick J. Ballantine	Rep
9th	Luther Jordan (Note: Redistricted from the 7th district.)	Dem	Patrick J. Ballantine	Rep
10th	Charles W. Albertson (Note: Redistricted from the 5th district.)	Dem	Charles W. Albertson	Dem
10th	Oscar Harris (Note: Redistricted from the 15th district.)	Dem	Charles W. Albertson	Dem
11th	A. B. Swindell (Note: Redistricted from the 10th district.)	Dem	A. B. Swindell	Dem
12th	Allen Wellons (Note: Redistricted from the 11th district.)	Dem	Fred Smith	Rep
13th	David F. Weinstein (Note: Redistricted from the 30th district.)	Dem	David F. Weinstein	Dem
14th	New seat		Vernon Malone	Dem
15th	John H. Carrington (Note: Redistricted from the 36th district.)	Rep	John H. Carrington	Rep
16th	Eric Miller Reeves (Note: Redistricted from the 14th district.)	Dem	Eric Miller Reeves	Dem
16th	Brad Miller (Note: Redistricted from the 14th district.)	Dem	Eric Miller Reeves	Dem
17th	New seat		Richard Y. Stevens	Rep
18th	Wib Gulley (Note: Redistricted from the 13th district.)	Dem	Wib Gulley	Dem
19th	Tony Rand (Note: Redistricted from the 24th district.)	Dem	Tony Rand	Dem
20th	Jeanne Hopkins Lucas (Note: Redistricted from the 13th district.)	Dem	Jeanne Hopkins Lucas	Dem
21st	Larry Shaw (Note: Redistricted from the 41st district.)	Dem	Larry Shaw	Dem
22nd	New seat		Harris Blake	Rep
23rd	Eleanor Kinnaird (Note: Redistricted from the 16th district.)	Dem	Eleanor Kinnaird	Dem
23rd	Howard Lee (Note: Redistricted from the 16th district.)	Dem	Eleanor Kinnaird	Dem
24th	Hugh Webster (Note: Redistricted from the 21st district.)	Rep	Hugh Webster	Rep
25th	William R. Purcell (Note: Redistricted from the 17th district.)	Dem	William R. Purcell	Dem
26th	Phil Berger (Note: Redistricted from the 12th district.)	Rep	Phil Berger (Note: Redistricted from the 12th district.)	Rep
26th	Bob Shaw (Note: Redistricted from the 19th district.)	Rep	Phil Berger	Rep
27th	Kay Hagan (Note: Redistricted from the 32nd district.)	Dem	Kay Hagan	Dem
28th	Bill Martin† (Note: Redistricted from the 31st district.)	Dem	Katie G. Dorsett	Dem
29th	New seat		Jerry W. Tillman	Rep
30th	John A. Garwood (Note: Redistricted from the 27th district.)	Rep	John A. Garwood	Rep
31st	Hamilton Horton Jr. (Note: Redistricted from the 20th district.)	Rep	Hamilton Horton Jr.	Rep
32nd	Linda Garrou (Note: Redistricted from the 20th district.)	Dem	Linda Garrou	Dem
33rd	Stan Bingham (Note: Redistricted from the 38th district.)	Rep	Stan Bingham	Rep
33rd	Cal Cunningham† (Note: Redistricted from the 23rd district.)	Dem	Stan Bingham	Rep
34th	New seat		Andrew C. Brock	Rep
35th	Aaron Plyler† (Note: Redistricted from the 17th district.)	Dem	Fern Shubert	Rep
36th	Fletcher L. Hartsell Jr. (Note: Redistricted from the 22nd district.)	Rep	Fletcher L. Hartsell Jr.	Rep
37th	Dan Clodfelter (Note: Redistricted from the 40th district.)	Dem	Dan Clodfelter	Dem
38th	Charlie Dannelly (Note: Redistricted from the 33rd district.)	Dem	Charlie Dannelly	Dem
39th	Bob Rucho (Note: Redistricted from the 35th district.)	Rep	Bob Rucho	Rep
40th	T. L. "Fountain" Odom (Note: Redistricted from the 34th district.)	Dem	Robert Pittenger	Rep
41st	New seat		R. B. Sloan Jr.	Rep
42nd	James Forrester (Note: Redistricted from the 39th district.)	Rep	James Forrester	Rep
43rd	David W. Hoyle (Note: Redistricted from the 25th district.)	Dem	David W. Hoyle	Dem
44th	Austin M. Allran (Note: Redistricted from the 26th district.)	Rep	Austin M. Allran	Rep
45th	Virginia Foxx (Note: Redistricted from the 12th district.)	Rep	Virginia Foxx	Rep
45th	Kenneth Moore (Note: Redistricted from the 27th district.)	Rep	Virginia Foxx	Rep
46th	Walter Dalton (Note: Redistricted from the 37th district.)	Dem	Walter Dalton	Dem
47th	New seat		Joe Sam Queen	Dem
48th	Charles Newell Carter† (Note: Redistricted from the 28th district.)	Dem	Tom Apodaca	Rep
49th	Steve Metcalf (Note: Redistricted from the 28th district.)	Dem	Steve Metcalf	Dem
50th	Robert C. Carpenter (Note: Redistricted from the 42nd district.)	Rep	Robert C. Carpenter	Rep
50th	Dan Robinson (Note: Redistricted from the 29th district.)	Dem	Robert C. Carpenter	Rep

† - Incumbent not seeking re-election

Party	Candi- dates	Votes		Seats		
Party	Candi- dates	No.	%	No.	+/–	%
Democratic Party	45	1,022,552	46.770%	28	▼7	56%
Republican Party	42	1,109,755	50.759%	22	▲7	44%
Libertarian Party	27	54,025	2.471%	0	Steady	0%
Total	114	2,186,332	100.00%	50	Steady	100.00%

Senate seats
Democratic	56%
Republican	44%

Popular vote
Republican	50.76%
Democratic	46.77%
Libertarian	2.47%

=== Incumbents defeated in the primary election ===
- Howard Lee (D-District 23) lost re-nomination to Eleanor Kinnaird in a redistricting race
- Bob Shaw (R-District 26) lost re-nomination to Phil Berger in a redistricting race
- Kenneth Moore (R-District 45) lost re-nomination to Virginia Foxx in a redistricting race

=== Incumbents defeated in the general election ===
- Allen Wellons (D-District 12), defeated by Fred Smith (R)
- T. L. "Fountain" Odom (D-District 40), defeated by Robert Pittenger (R)

=== Open seats that changed parties ===
- Aaron Plyler (D-District 35) didn't seek re-election, seat won by Fern Shubert (R)
- Charles Newell Carter (D-District 28) didn't seek re-election, seat won by Tom Apodaca
- Dan Robinson (D-District 50) lost a redistricting race to Robert C. Carpenter (R-District 50)

=== Newly created seats ===
- District 5, won by Tony P. Moore (D)
- District 6, won by Cecil Hargett (D)
- District 14, won by Vernon Malone (D)
- District 17, won by Richard Y. Stevens (R)
- District 22, won by Harris Blake (R)
- District 29, won by Jerry W. Tillman (R)
- District 34, won by Andrew C. Brock (R)
- District 41, won by R. B. Sloan Jr. (R)
- District 47, won by Joe Sam Queen (D)

== Predictions ==
Source	Ranking	As of
The Cook; Political Report	Tossup	October 4, 2002

== Detailed results ==
=== Districts 1–25 ===
==== District 1 ====
Incumbent Democratic President Pro Tempore Marc Basnight has represented the 1st district since 1985.

North Carolina Senate 1st district general election, 2002
Party	Candidate	Votes	%
Democratic	Marc Basnight (incumbent)	32,723	66.63%
Republican	Ron Toppin	16,392	33.37%
Total votes		49,115	100%
Democratic hold			

==== District 2 ====
The new 2nd district overlaps with much of the former 3rd district. Incumbent Democrat Scott Thomas, who has represented the 3rd district since 2001, was re-elected here. Republican primary

North Carolina Senate 2nd district Republican primary election, 2002
Party	Candidate	Votes	%
Republican	Chuck Tyson	5,951	56.67%
Republican	Jule D. Wheatly	4,551	43.33%
Total votes		10,502	100%

General election

North Carolina Senate 2nd district general election, 2002
Party	Candidate	Votes	%
Democratic	Scott Thomas (incumbent)	26,011	51.69%
Republican	Chuck Tyson	24,310	48.31%
Total votes		50,321	100%
Democratic hold			

==== District 3 ====
The new 3rd district includes the homes of incumbent Democrats Edward Warren, who has represented the 9th district since 1991, and R. L. "Bob" Martin, who has represented the 6th district since 1985. Neither sought re-election here and Democrat Clark Jenkins won the open seat. Democratic primary

North Carolina Senate 3rd district Democratic primary election, 2002
Party	Candidate	Votes	%
Democratic	Clark Jenkins	10,687	45.30%
Democratic	Patricia Ferguson	9,757	41.36%
Democratic	Ann M. Slocumb	1,626	6.89%
Democratic	Henry Williams II	1,523	6.46%
Total votes		23,593	100%

General election

North Carolina Senate 3rd district general election, 2002
Party	Candidate	Votes	%
Democratic	Clark Jenkins	26,444	66.69%
Republican	Don Carson	12,743	32.14%
Libertarian	Henry Boschen	464	1.17%
Total votes		39,651	100%
Democratic hold			

==== District 4 ====
The new 4th district overlaps with much of the former 2nd district. Incumbent Democrat Frank Ballance, who has represented the 2nd district since 1989, ran for the U.S. House. Democrat Robert Lee Holloman won the open seat. Democratic primary

North Carolina Senate 4th district Democratic primary election, 2002
Party	Candidate	Votes	%
Democratic	Robert Lee Holloman	8,142	31.61%
Democratic	Robert B. Partin	6,950	26.99%
Democratic	Ronnie C. Reaves	5,133	19.93%
Democratic	Clinton G. "T-Bone" Alston	3,040	11.80%
Democratic	Charles J. Worth	2,490	9.67%
Total votes		25,755	100%

General election

North Carolina Senate 4th district general election, 2002
Party	Candidate	Votes	%
Democratic	Robert Lee Holloman	28,336	84.11%
Libertarian	Tom Eisenmenger	5,352	15.89%
Total votes		33,688	100%
Democratic hold			

==== District 5 ====
The new 5th district is based in Wilson and Pitt counties and isn't a safe seat for either party. Democrat Tony P. Moore won the open seat. Democratic primary

North Carolina Senate 5th district Democratic primary election, 2002
Party	Candidate	Votes	%
Democratic	Tony P. Moore	5,005	33.94%
Democratic	James M. Johnson III	4,859	32.95%
Democratic	William L. Neill	2,511	17.03%
Democratic	Robert Wheeler Jr.	2,371	16.08%
Total votes		14,746	100%

Republican primary

North Carolina Senate 5th district Republican primary election, 2002
Party	Candidate	Votes	%
Republican	Tom Coulson	3,651	69.74%
Republican	George H. Gray	1,584	30.26%
Total votes		5,235	100%

General election

North Carolina Senate 5th district general election, 2002
Party	Candidate	Votes	%
Democratic	Tony P. Moore	22,265	50.86%
Republican	Tom Coulson	20,992	47.95%
Libertarian	Christopher Ruff	521	1.19%
Total votes		43,778	100%
Democratic win (new seat)			

==== District 6 ====
The new 6th district is based in Jones and Onslow counties. Democrat Cecil Hargett won the open seat. Democratic primary

North Carolina Senate 6th district Democratic primary election, 2002
Party	Candidate	Votes	%
Democratic	Cecil Hargett	6,329	63.70%
Democratic	Kever M. Clark	3,606	36.30%
Total votes		9,935	100%

Republican primary

North Carolina Senate 6th district Republican primary election, 2002
Party	Candidate	Votes	%
Republican	Tommy Pollard Jr.	2,893	61.61%
Republican	Thomas R. "Tom" Mattison	1,803	38.39%
Total votes		4,696	100%

General election

North Carolina Senate 6th district general election, 2002
Party	Candidate	Votes	%
Democratic	Cecil Hargett	14,146	51.78%
Republican	Tommy Pollard Jr.	13,175	48.22%
Total votes		27,321	100%
Democratic win (new seat)			

==== District 7 ====
The new 7th district overlaps with much of the former 8th district. Incumbent Democrat John Kerr, who has represented the 8th district since 1993, was re-elected here.

North Carolina Senate 7th district general election, 2002
Party	Candidate	Votes	%
Democratic	John Kerr (incumbent)	21,211	53.95%
Republican	Carolyn B. Russell	18,108	46.05%
Total votes		39,319	100%
Democratic hold			

==== District 8 ====
The new 8th district overlaps with much of the former 18th district.
Incumbent Democrat R. C. Soles Jr., who has represented the 18th district and its predecessors since 1977, was re-elected here. Republican primary

North Carolina Senate 8th district Republican election, 2002
Party	Candidate	Votes	%
Republican	Ray Gilbert	3,208	56.47%
Republican	Dial Gray	2,473	43.53%
Total votes		5,681	100%

General election

North Carolina District 8th district general election, 2002
Party	Candidate	Votes	%
Democratic	R. C. Soles Jr. (incumbent)	28,513	54.56%
Republican	Ray Gilbert	20,993	40.17%
Libertarian	Edward Gore	2,750	5.26%
Total votes		52,256	100%
Democratic hold			

==== District 9 ====
The new 9th district includes the homes of incumbent Republican Patrick J. Ballantine, who has represented the 4th district since 1995, and Democrat Luther Jordan, who has represented the 7th district since 1993, Ballantine was re-elected here. Republican primary

North Carolina Senate 9th district Republican primary election, 2002
Party	Candidate	Votes	%
Republican	Patrick J. Ballantine (incumbent)	8,552	88.82%
Republican	Dallas J. Brown Jr.	1,076	11.18%
Total votes		9,628	100%

General election

North Carolina Senate 9th district general election, 2002
Party	Candidate	Votes	%
Republican	Patrick J. Ballantine (incumbent)	34,361	65.11%
Democratic	Laura Padgett	17,381	32.93%
Libertarian	Shaun Mitchell	1,033	1.96%
Total votes		52,775	100%
Republican hold			

==== District 10 ====
The new 10th district includes the homes of incumbent Democrats Charles W. Albertson, who has represented the 5th district since 1993, and Oscar Harris, who has represented the 15th district since 1999, Albertson was re-elected here. Democratic primary

North Carolina Senate 10th district Democratic primary election, 2002
Party	Candidate	Votes	%
Democratic	Charles W. Albertson (incumbent)	10,935	70.22%
Democratic	Robert Bradshaw	4,638	29.78%
Total votes		15,573	100%

Republican primary

North Carolina Senate 10th district Republican primary election, 2002
Party	Candidate	Votes	%
Republican	George E. Wilson	5,048	69.69%
Republican	Lewis T. Harris III	1,121	15.47%
Republican	Derl Walker	1,075	14.84%
Total votes		7,244	100%

General election

North Carolina Senate 10th district general election, 2002
Party	Candidate	Votes	%
Democratic	Charles W. Albertson (incumbent)	21,927	54.52%
Republican	George E. Wilson	18,290	45.48%
Total votes		40,217	100%
Democratic hold			

==== District 11 ====
The new 11th district overlaps with much of the former 10th district. Incumbent Democrat A. B. Swindell, who has represented the 10th district since 2001, was re-elected here.

North Carolina Senate 11th district general election, 2002
Party	Candidate	Votes	%
Democratic	A. B. Swindell (incumbent)	26,471	60.13%
Republican	Willie Cooke	16,636	37.79%
Libertarian	Charles Yow	914	2.08%
Total votes		44,021	100%
Democratic hold			

==== District 12 ====
The new 12th district includes the homes of incumbent Democrat Allen Wellons, who has represented the 11th district since 1997. Wellons lost re-election here to Republican Fred Smith. Republican primary

North Carolina Senate 12th district Republican primary election, 2002
Party	Candidate	Votes	%
Republican	Fred Smith	6,371	80.54%
Republican	E. Ray Boswell	1,539	19.46%
Total votes		7,910	100%

General election

North Carolina Senate 12th district general election, 2002
Party	Candidate	Votes	%
Republican	Fred Smith	26,225	57.67%
Democratic	Allen Wellons (incumbent)	19,253	42.33%
Total votes		45,478	100%
Republican gain from Democratic			

==== District 13 ====
The new 13th district overlaps with much of the former 30th district. Incumbent Democrat David F. Weinstein, who has represented the 30th district since 1997, was re-elected here.

North Carolina Senate 13th district general election, 2002
Party	Candidate	Votes	%
Democratic	David F. Weinstein (incumbent)	21,602	100%
Total votes		21,602	100%
Democratic hold			

==== District 14 ====
The new 14th district is based in Wake County and has no incumbent. Democrat Vernon Malone won the open seat. Republican primary

North Carolina Senate 14th district Republican primary election, 2002
Party	Candidate	Votes	%
Republican	Carol Bennett	1,999	55.65%
Republican	Loretta Thompson	1,593	44.35%
Total votes		3,592	100%

General election

North Carolina Senate 14th district general election, 2002
Party	Candidate	Votes	%
Democratic	Vernon Malone	28,469	64.55%
Republican	Carol Bennett	14,518	32.92%
Libertarian	Richard Davison	1,117	2.53%
Total votes		44,104	100%
Democratic win (new seat)			

==== District 15 ====
The new 15th district overlaps with much of the former 36th district. Incumbent Republican John H. Carrington, who has represented the 15th district since 1995, was re-elected here. Republican primary

North Carolina Senate 15th district Republican primary election, 2002
Party	Candidate	Votes	%
Republican	John H. Carrington (incumbent)	8,126	70.48%
Republican	George C. Mackie Jr.	3,403	29.52%
Total votes		11,529	100%

General election

North Carolina Senate 15th district general election, 2002
Party	Candidate	Votes	%
Republican	John H. Carrington (incumbent)	36,177	57.08%
Democratic	Dorothy Gerry Bowles	25,581	40.36%
Libertarian	Nathan Wilson	1,626	2.57%
Total votes		63,384	100%
Republican hold			

==== District 16 ====
The new 16th district overlaps with much of the former 14th district. Incumbent Democrats Eric Miller Reeves and Brad Miller have represented the 14th district since 1997.
Miller ran for the U.S. House while Reeves was re-elected here.

North Carolina Senate 16th district general election, 2002
Party	Candidate	Votes	%
Democratic	Eric Miller Reeves (incumbent)	25,799	49.29%
Republican	Paul Coble	25,323	48.38%
Libertarian	Jason Mara	1,215	2.32%
Total votes		52,337	100%
Democratic hold			

==== District 17 ====
The new 17th district is based in Southern Wake County and had no incumbent. Republican Richard Y. Stevens won the open seat. Republican primary

North Carolina Senate 17th district Republican primary election, 2002
Party	Candidate	Votes	%
Republican	Richard Y. Stevens	6,213	69.53%
Republican	David S. Sharpe Jr.	2,723	30.47%
Total votes		8,936	100%

General election

North Carolina Senate 17th district general election, 2002
Party	Candidate	Votes	%
Republican	Richard Y. Stevens	37,076	61.69%
Democratic	Thomas B. Hunt	20,616	34.30%
Libertarian	Susan Hogarth	2,411	4.01%
Total votes		60,103	100%
Republican win (new seat)			

==== District 18 ====
The new 18th district overlaps with much of the northern portion of the former 13th district. Incumbent Democrat Wib Gulley, who has represented the 13th district since 1993, was re-elected here.

North Carolina Senate 18th district general election, 2002
Party	Candidate	Votes	%
Democratic	Wib Gulley (incumbent)	27,335	46.23%
Republican	Tom Davidson	19,706	40.53%
Libertarian	Mark Kitchens	1,576	3.24%
Total votes		48,617	100%
Democratic hold			

==== District 19 ====
The new 19th district overlaps with much of the former 24th district. Incumbent Democrat Tony Rand, who has represented the 24th district since 1995, was re-elected here. Democratic primary

North Carolina Senate 19th district Democratic primary election, 2002
Party	Candidate	Votes	%
Democratic	Tony Rand (incumbent)	15,025	77.58%
Democratic	Russell McLaurin	4,341	22.42%
Total votes		19,366	100%

General election

North Carolina Senate 19th district general election, 2002
Party	Candidate	Votes	%
Democratic	Tony Rand (incumbent)	25,493	63.36%
Republican	Bob White	14,741	36.64%
Total votes		40,234	100%
Democratic hold			

==== District 20 ====
The new 20th district (based in Durham County) overlaps with much of the southern portion of the old 13th district. Incumbent Democrat Jeanne Hopkins Lucas, who has represented the 13th district since 1993, was re-elected here.

North Carolina Senate District 20th district general election, 2002
Party	Candidate	Votes	%
Democratic	Jeanne Hopkins Lucas (incumbent)	30,216	89.31%
Libertarian	Jonathan Guze	3,617	10.69%
Total votes		33,833	100%
Democratic hold			

==== District 21 ====
The new 21st district overlaps with much of the former 41st district. Incumbent Democrat Larry Shaw, who has represented the 41st district since 1995, was re-elected here. Democratic primary

North Carolina Senate 21st district Democratic primary election, 2002
Party	Candidate	Votes	%
Democratic	Larry Shaw (incumbent)	6,951	66.31%
Democratic	Audrey "Sister" Ray	3,532	33.69%
Total votes		10,483	100%

General election

North Carolina Senate 21st district general election, 2002
Party	Candidate	Votes	%
Democratic	Larry Shaw (incumbent)	16,584	66.66%
Republican	Richard D. Evans	8,293	33.34%
Total votes		24,877	100%
Democratic hold			

==== District 22 ====
The new 22nd district includes all of Moore and Lee counties, as well as the western portion of Harnett County. Republican Harris Blake won the open seat. Democratic primary

North Carolina Senate 22nd district Democratic primary election, 2002
Party	Candidate	Votes	%
Democratic	Jimmy L. Love Sr.	6,690	62.17%
Democratic	Wanda H. Hunt	4,071	37.83%
Total votes		10,761	100%

Republican primary

North Carolina Senate 22nd district Republican primary election, 2002
Party	Candidate	Votes	%
Republican	Harris Blake	4,687	37.29%
Republican	Teena S. Little	3,995	31.78%
Republican	Bobby Ray Hall	1,963	15.62%
Republican	Tim McNeill	1,925	15.31%
Total votes		12,570	100%

General election

North Carolina Senate 22nd district general election, 2002
Party	Candidate	Votes	%
Republican	Harris Blake	24,975	54.43%
Democratic	Jimmy L. Love Sr.	20,072	43.74%
Libertarian	Jonathan Lubecky	840	1.83%
Total votes		45,887	100%
Republican win (new seat)			

==== District 23 ====
The new 23rd district overlaps with much of the former 16th district. Incumbent Democrats Eleanor Kinnaird and Howard Lee have both represented the 16th district since 1997. Kinnaird was re-elected here. Democratic primary

North Carolina Senate 23rd district Democratic primary election, 2002
Party	Candidate	Votes	%
Democratic	Eleanor Kinnaird (incumbent)	12,488	50.24%
Democratic	Howard Lee (incumbent)	12,369	49.76%
Total votes		24,857	100%

General election

2002 North Carolina Senate 23rd district general election, 2002
Party	Candidate	Votes	%
Democratic	Eleanor Kinnaird (incumbent)	37,481	65.74%
Republican	Peter Morcombe	17,686	31.02%
Libertarian	Christopher Todd Goss	1,847	3.24%
Total votes		57,014	100%
Democratic hold			

==== District 24 ====
The new 24th district overlaps with much of the former 21st district. Incumbent Republican Hugh Webster, who has represented the 21st district since 1995, was re-elected here.

North Carolina Senate 24th district general election, 2002
Party	Candidate	Votes	%
Republican	Hugh Webster (incumbent)	23,685	57.79%
Democratic	Bill Powell	17,299	42.21%
Total votes		40,984	100%
Republican hold			

==== District 25 ====
The new 25th district overlaps with much of the eastern portion of the former 17th district. Incumbent Democrat William R. Purcell, who has represented the 17th district since 1997, was re-elected here.

North Carolina Senate 25th district general election, 2002
Party	Candidate	Votes	%
Democratic	William R. Purcell (incumbent)	24,178	57.63%
Republican	Donald M. Dawkins	17,778	42.37%
Total votes		41,956	100%
Democratic hold			

=== Districts 26–50 ===
==== District 26 ====
The new 26th district includes the homes of incumbent Republicans Phil Berger, who has represented the 12th district since 2001, and Bob Shaw, who has represented the 19th district since 1985. Berger was re-elected here. Republican primary

North Carolina Senate 26th district Republican primary election, 2002
Party	Candidate	Votes	%
Republican	Phil Berger (incumbent)	4,580	52.82%
Republican	Bob Shaw (incumbent)	4,091	47.18%
Total votes		8,671	100%

General election

North Carolina Senate 26th district general election, 2002
Party	Candidate	Votes	%
Republican	Phil Berger (incumbent)	40,187	84.69%
Libertarian	Jim Capo	7,264	15.31%
Total votes		47,451	100%
Republican hold			

==== District 27 ====
The new 27th district overlaps with much of the former 32nd district. Incumbent Democrat Kay Hagan, who has represented the 32nd district since 1999, was re-elected here.

North Carolina Senate 27th district general election, 2002
Party	Candidate	Votes	%
Democratic	Kay Hagan (incumbent)	28,170	56.16%
Republican	Mark McDaniel	20,714	41.30%
Libertarian	Tom Bailey	1,272	2.54%
Total votes		50,156	100%
Democratic hold			

==== District 28 ====
The new 28th district overlaps with much of the former 31st district. Incumbent Democrat Bill Martin, who has represented the 31st district since 1983 did not seek re-election. Democrat Katie G. Dorsett won the open seat.

North Carolina Senate 28th district general election, 2002
Party	Candidate	Votes	%
Democratic	Katie G. Dorsett	26,395	64.01%
Republican	Mike Causey	14,139	34.29%
Libertarian	Eric Preston Medlock	702	1.70%
Total votes		41,236	100%
Democratic hold			

==== District 29 ====
The new 29th district includes Randolph and Montgomery counties and had no incumbent. Republican Jerry W. Tillman won the open seat. Democratic primary

North Carolina Senate 29th district Democratic primary election, 2002
Party	Candidate	Votes	%
Democratic	Mac Whatley	3,864	64.50%
Democratic	Charles K. Moss	2,127	35.50%
Total votes		5,991	100%

Republican primary

North Carolina Senate 29th district Republican primary election, 2002
Party	Candidate	Votes	%
Republican	Jerry W. Tillman	6,616	46.26%
Republican	Bob Crumley	3,509	24.54%
Republican	Joe O. Shaw	3,314	23.17%
Republican	Max Gardner Reece Jr.	862	6.03%
Total votes		14,301	100%

General election

North Carolina Senate 29th district general election, 2002
Party	Candidate	Votes	%
Republican	Jerry W. Tillman	24,972	64.64%
Democratic	Mac Whatley	12,932	33.47%
Libertarian	Douglas Kania	728	1.88%
Total votes		38,632	100%
Republican win (new seat)			

==== District 30 ====
The new 30th district overlaps with much of the former 27th district. Incumbent Republican John A. Garwood, who has represented the 27th district since 1997, was re-elected here. Democratic primary

North Carolina Senate 30th district Democratic election, 2002
Party	Candidate	Votes	%
Democratic	Ed Gambill	4,648	54.09%
Democratic	Lana Wood Brendle	3,945	45.91%
Total votes		8,593	100%

Republican primary

North Carolina Senate 30th district Republican primary election, 2002
Party	Candidate	Votes	%
Republican	John A. Garwood (incumbent)	6,205	54.88%
Republican	Don W. East	5,101	45.12%
Total votes		11,306	100%

General election

North Carolina Senate 30th district general election, 2002
Party	Candidate	Votes	%
Republican	John A. Garwood (incumbent)	28,591	61.16%
Democratic	Ed Gambill	16,842	36.03%
Libertarian	James Wentz	1,315	2.81%
Total votes		46,748	100%
Republican hold			

==== District 31 ====
The new 31st district overlaps with parts of the former 20th district. Incumbent Republican Hamilton Horton Jr., who has represented the 20th district since 1995, was re-elected here.

North Carolina Senate 31st district general election, 2002
Party	Candidate	Votes	%
Republican	Hamilton Horton Jr. (incumbent)	43,590	88.15%
Libertarian	Donn Linton	5,857	11.85%
Total votes		49,447	100%
Republican hold			

==== District 32 ====
the new 32nd district overlaps with parts of the former 20th district. Incumbent Democrat Linda Garrou, who has represented the 20th district since 1999, was re-elected here.

North Carolina Senate 32nd district general election, 2002
Party	Candidate	Votes	%
Democratic	Linda Garrou (incumbent)	28,388	100%
Total votes		28,388	100%
Democratic hold			

==== District 33 ====
The new 33rd district includes the homes of incumbent Democrat Cal Cunningham, who has represented the 23rd district since 2001, and incumbent Republican Stan Bingham, who has represented the 38th district since 2001. Cunningham did not seek re-election and Bingham was re-elected here. Republican primary

North Carolina Senate 33rd district Republican primary election, 2002
Party	Candidate	Votes	%
Republican	Stan Bingham (incumbent)	8,609	71.13%
Republican	Ronald Gilbert Coleman	3,495	28.87%
Total votes		12,104	100%

General election

North Carolina Senate 33rd district general election, 2002
Party	Candidate	Votes	%
Republican	Stan Bingham (incumbent)	39,932	100%
Total votes		39,932	100%
Republican hold			

==== District 34 ====
The new 34th district includes all of Davie and Yadkin counties as well as most of Rowan County. Republican Andrew C. Brock won the open seat. Democratic primary

North Carolina Senate 34th district Democratic primary election, 2002
Party	Candidate	Votes	%
Democratic	John Carlyle Sherrill III	4,720	58.82%
Democratic	Debra Brown Groce	3,305	41.18%
Total votes		8,025	100%

Republican primary

North Carolina Senate 34th district Republican primary election, 2002
Party	Candidate	Votes	%
Republican	Andrew C. Brock	6,816	36.69%
Republican	Gus Andrews	5,972	32.15%
Republican	Mac Butner	4,830	26.00%
Republican	Baxter (Bo) Turner	957	5.15%
Total votes		18,575	100%

General election

North Carolina Senate 34th district general election, 2002
Party	Candidate	Votes	%
Republican	Andrew C. Brock	28,593	60.19%
Democratic	John Carlyle Sherrill III	17,625	37.10%
Libertarian	J. Conrad Jones	1,290	2.72%
Total votes		47,508	100%
Republican win (new seat)			

==== District 35 ====
The new 35th district overlaps with much of the western portion of the old 17th district. Incumbent Democrat Aaron Plyler, who has represented the 17th district since 1983, did not seek re-election. Republican Fern Shubert won the open seat. Republican primary

North Carolina Senate 35th district Republican primary election, 2002
Party	Candidate	Votes	%
Republican	Fern Shubert	5,823	49.23%
Republican	Eddie Goodall	2,122	17.94%
Republican	Clayton Loflin	1,541	13.03%
Republican	Paul Standridge	1,220	10.31%
Republican	W. P. "Bill" Davis	1,122	9.49%
Total votes		11,828	100%

General election

North Carolina Senate 35th district general election, 2002
Party	Candidate	Votes	%
Republican	Fern Shubert	33,822	66.68%
Democratic	Frank McGuirt	16,903	33.32%
Total votes		50,725	100%
Republican gain from Democratic			

==== District 36 ====
The new 36th district overlaps with much of the former 22nd district. Incumbent Republican Fletcher L. Hartsell Jr., who has represented the 22nd district since 1991, was re-elected here.

North Carolina Senate 36th district general election, 2002
Party	Candidate	Votes	%
Republican	Fletcher L. Hartsell Jr. (incumbent)	31,428	66.23%
Democratic	Larry Harris	13,363	28.16%
Libertarian	Mike Helms	2,664	5.61%
Total votes		47,455	100%
Republican hold			

==== District 37 ====
The new 37th district overlaps with much of the former 40th district. Incumbent Democrat Dan Clodfelter, who has represented the 40th district since 1999, was re-elected here.

North Carolina Senate 37th district general election, 2002
Party	Candidate	Votes	%
Democratic	Dan Clodfelter (incumbent)	23,003	100%
Total votes		23,003	100%
Democratic hold			

==== District 38 ====
The new 38th district overlaps with much of the former 33rd district. Incumbent Democrat Charlie Dannelly, who has represented the 38th district since 1995, was re-elected here.

North Carolina Senate 38th district general election, 2002
Party	Candidate	Votes	%
Democratic	Charlie Dannelly (incumbent)	26,569	100%
Total votes		26,569	100%
Democratic hold			

==== District 39 ====
The new 39th district overlaps with much of the former 35th district. Incumbent Republican Bob Rucho, who has represented the 35th district since 1997, was re-elected here.

North Carolina Senate 39th district general election, 2002
Party	Candidate	Votes	%
Republican	Bob Rucho (incumbent)	37,700	65.15%
Democratic	Joe Spencer	18,244	31.53%
Libertarian	Heather Head	1,919	3.32%
Total votes		57,863	100%
Republican hold			

==== District 40 ====
The new 40th district overlaps with much of the former 34th district. Incumbent Democrat T. L. "Fountain" Odom, who has represented the 40th district since 1989, lost re-election here to Republican Robert Pittenger.

North Carolina Senate 40th district general election, 2002
Party	Candidate	Votes	%
Republican	Robert Pittenger	29,979	54.55%
Democratic	T. L. "Fountain" Odom (incumbent)	23,704	43.13%
Libertarian	Steven Wright	1,272	2.31%
Total votes		54,955	100%
Republican gain from Democratic			

==== District 41 ====
The new 41st district includes all of Alexander and Iredell counties and had no incumbent. Republican R. B. Sloan Jr. won the open seat.

North Carolina Senate 41st district general election, 2002
Party	Candidate	Votes	%
Republican	R. B. Sloan Jr.	30,338	68.02%
Democratic	Victor Crosby	14,261	31.98%
Total votes		44,599	100%
Republican win (new seat)			

==== District 42 ====
The new 42nd district overlaps with much of the former 39th district. Incumbent Republican James Forrester, who has represented the 39th district and its predecessors since 1991, was re-elected here. Republican primary

North Carolina Senate 42nd district Republican primary election, 2002
Party	Candidate	Votes	%
Republican	James Forrester (incumbent)	9,625	80.46%
Republican	Ronald Pope	2,337	19.54%
Total votes		11,962	100%

General election

North Carolina Senate 42nd district general election, 2002
Party	Candidate	Votes	%
Republican	James Forrester (incumbent)	36,478	100%
Total votes		36,478	100%
Republican hold			

==== District 43 ====
The new 43rd district overlaps with much of the former 25th district. Incumbent Democrat David W. Hoyle, who has represented the 25th district since 1993, was re-elected here.

North Carolina Senate 43rd district general election, 2002
Party	Candidate	Votes	%
Democratic	David W. Hoyle (incumbent)	18,958	53.01%
Republican	Michael Harrington	16,805	46.99%
Total votes		35,763	100%
Democratic hold			

==== District 44 ====
The new 44th district overlaps with much of the former 26th district. Incumbent Republican Austin M. Allran, who has represented the 26th district since 1987, was re-elected here. Republican primary

North Carolina Senate 44th district Republican primary election, 2002
Party	Candidate	Votes	%
Republican	Austin M. Allran (incumbent)	5,728	63.04%
Republican	William R. "Bill" McDonald III	3,358	36.96%
Total votes		9,086	100%

General election

North Carolina Senate 44th district general election, 2002
Party	Candidate	Votes	%
Republican	Austin M. Allran (incumbent)	30,278	100%
Total votes		30,278	100%
Republican hold			

==== District 45 ====
The new 45th district includes the homes of incumbent Republicans Virginia Foxx, who has represented the 12th district since 1995, and Kenneth Moore, who has represented the 27th district since 1997. Foxx was re-elected here.

North Carolina Senate 45th district general election, 2002
Party	Candidate	Votes	%
Republican	Virginia Foxx (incumbent)	32,971	61.81%
Democratic	Mollie C. Laws	18,602	34.87%
Libertarian	Fran Grig	1,768	3.31%
Total votes		53,341	100%
Republican hold			

==== District 46 ====
The new 46th district overlaps with much of the former 37th district. Incumbent Democrat Walter Dalton, who has represented the 37th district since 1997, was re-elected here.

North Carolina Senate 46th district general election, 2002
Party	Candidate	Votes	%
Democratic	Walter Dalton (incumbent)	22,251	52.43%
Republican	John Weatherly	19,118	45.05%
Libertarian	Tony Brown	1,072	2.53%
Total votes		42,441	100%
Democratic hold			

==== District 47 ====
The new 47th district includes all of Avery, Mitchell, McDowell, Yancey, and Madison counties as well as most of Haywood County. The district had no incumbent and Democrat Joe Sam Queen won the open seat. Republican primary

North Carolina Senate 47th district Republican primary election, 2002
Party	Candidate	Votes	%
Republican	Gregg Thompson	5,749	41.99%
Republican	Keith Presnell	4,307	31.46%
Republican	Judith C. Fraser	2,671	19.51%
Republican	Garry W. Aldridge	964	7.04%
Total votes		13,691	100%

General election

2002 North Carolina Senate District 47th district general election, 2002
Party	Candidate	Votes	%
Democratic	Joe Sam Queen	25,022	49.05%
Republican	Gregg Thompson	24,375	47.78%
Libertarian	Sherry Hill	1,619	3.17%
Total votes		51,016	100%
Democratic win (new seat)			

==== District 48 ====
The new 48th District includes all of Henderson and Polk counties as well as southwestern Buncombe County. The District includes the home of Incumbent Democrat Charles Newell Carter, who has represented the 28th district since 1999. Carter did not seek re-election and Republican Tom Apodaca won the open seat. Republican primary

North Carolina Senate 48th district Republican primary election, 2002
Party	Candidate	Votes	%
Republican	Tom Apodaca	6,182	34.72%
Republican	Grady H. Hawkins	4,636	26.04%
Republican	Ralph Ledford	4,081	22.92%
Republican	Jesse Ledbetter	2,905	16.32%
Total votes		17,804	100%

General election

North Carolina Senate 48th district general election, 2002
Party	Candidate	Votes	%
Republican	Tom Apodaca	32,685	66.74%
Democratic	Robert Cogburn Burris	16,291	33.26%
Total votes		48,976	100%
Republican gain from Democratic			

==== District 49 ====
The new 49th district overlaps with much of the western portion of the old 28th district. Incumbent Democrat Steve Metcalf, who has represented the 28th district since 1999, was re-elected here.

North Carolina Senate 49th district general election, 2002
Party	Candidate	Votes	%
Democratic	Steve Metcalf (incumbent)	26,459	55.93%
Republican	R. L. Clark	20,845	44.07%
Total votes		47,304	100%
Democratic hold			

==== District 50 ====
The new 50th district includes the homes of Incumbent Democrat Dan Robinson, who has represented the 29th district since 1999, and incumbent Republican Robert C. Carpenter, who has represented the 42nd district since 1989. Carpenter defeated Robinson to win another term in the Senate.

North Carolina Senate 50th district general election, 2002
Party	Candidate	Votes	%
Republican	Robert C. Carpenter (incumbent)	30,032	56.46%
Democratic	Dan Robinson (incumbent)	23,164	43.54%
Total votes		53,196	100%
Republican hold			

== See also ==
- List of North Carolina state legislatures
