= 1998 North Carolina Senate election =

- November 3, 1998

All 50 seats in the North Carolina Senate 26 (without Lieutenant Governor) seats needed for a majority
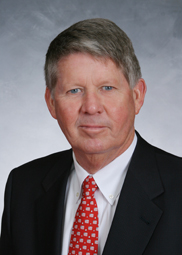

	Majority party	Minority party
Leader	Marc Basnight	Robert Shaw
Party	Democratic	Republican
Leader since	January 1, 1993	January 1, 1991
Leader's seat	1st - Manteo	19th - Greensboro
Last election	30	20
Seats won	35	15
Seat change	▲5	▼5
President pro tempore before election
Marc Basnight
Democratic
Elected President pro tempore
Marc Basnight
Democratic

The 1998 North Carolina Senate election was held on November 3, 1998, to determine which party would control the North Carolina Senate for the following two years in the 144th North Carolina General Assembly. All fifty senate seats were up for election. Prior to the election 30 seats were held by Democrats and 20 were held by Republicans. The general election saw the Democrats expand their majority by five seats, thereby retaining control of the North Carolina Senate.

== Retirements ==
Three incumbents (1 Republican and 2 Democrats) did not run for re-election in 1998. Those incumbents were:

1. District 15: Daniel Page (R) retired.
2. District 29: Thomas Jenkins (D) retired.
3. District 40: Leslie Winner (D) retired.

== Incumbents defeated ==
=== Republicans ===
1. District 20: James Mark McDaniel (R) lost re-election to Linda Garrou.
2. District 28: Jesse Ledbetter (R) lost re-election to Steve Metcalf.
3. District 28: R. L. Clark (R) lost re-election to Charles Newell Carter.
4. District 32: John Blust (R) lost re-election to Kay Hagan.

== Results summary ==
District	Incumbent	Party	Elected	Party
1st	Marc Basnight	Dem	Marc Basnight	Dem
2nd	Frank Ballance	Dem	Frank Ballance	Dem
3rd	Bev Perdue	Dem	Bev Perdue	Dem
4th	Patrick J. Ballantine	Rep	Patrick J. Ballantine	Rep
5th	Charles W. Albertson	Dem	Charles W. Albertson	Dem
6th	R. L. "Bob" Martin	Dem	R. L. "Bob" Martin	Dem
7th	Luther Jordan	Dem	Luther Jordan	Dem
8th	John Kerr	Dem	John Kerr	Dem
9th	Edward Warren	Dem	Edward Warren	Dem
10th	Roy Cooper	Dem	Roy Cooper	Dem
11th	Allen Wellons	Dem	Allen Wellons	Dem
12th	Virginia Foxx	Rep	Virginia Foxx	Rep
12th	Don W. East	Rep	Don W. East	Rep
13th	Wib Gulley	Dem	Wib Gulley	Dem
13th	Jeanne Hopkins Lucas	Dem	Jeanne Hopkins Lucas	Dem
14th	Brad Miller	Dem	Brad Miller	Dem
14th	Eric Miller Reeves	Dem	Eric Miller Reeves	Dem
15th	Daniel Page†	Rep	Oscar Harris	Dem
16th	Eleanor Kinnaird	Dem	Eleanor Kinnaird	Dem
16th	Howard Lee	Dem	Howard Lee	Dem
17th	Aaron Plyler	Dem	Aaron Plyler	Dem
17th	William R. Purcell	Dem	William R. Purcell	Dem
18th	R. C. Soles Jr.	Dem	R. C. Soles Jr.	Dem
19th	Bob Shaw	Rep	Bob Shaw	Rep
20th	James Mark McDaniel	Rep	Linda Garrou	Dem
20th	Hamilton Horton Jr.	Rep	Hamilton Horton Jr.	Rep
21st	Hugh Webster	Rep	Hugh Webster	Rep
22nd	Fletcher L. Hartsell Jr.	Rep	Fletcher L. Hartsell Jr.	Rep
23rd	Jim Phillips Sr.	Dem	Jim Phillips Sr.	Dem
24th	Tony Rand	Dem	Tony Rand	Dem
25th	David W. Hoyle	Dem	David W. Hoyle	Dem
26th	Austin M. Allran	Rep	Austin M. Allran	Rep
27th	Kenneth Moore	Rep	Kenneth Moore	Rep
27th	John Garwood	Rep	John Garwood	Rep
28th	Jesse Ledbetter	Rep	Steve Metcalf	Dem
28th	R. L. Clark	Rep	Charles Newell Carter	Dem
29th	Thomas Jenkins†	Dem	Dan Robinson	Dem
30th	David Weinstein	Dem	David Weinstein	Dem
31st	Bill Martin	Dem	Bill Martin	Dem
32nd	John Blust	Rep	Kay Hagan	Dem
33rd	Charlie Dannelly	Dem	Charlie Dannelly	Dem
34th	T. L. "Fountain" Odom	Dem	T. L. "Fountain" Odom	Dem
35th	Bob Rucho	Rep	Bob Rucho	Rep
36th	John Carrington	Rep	John Carrington	Rep
37th	Walter Dalton	Dem	Walter Dalton	Dem
38th	Betsy Lane Cochrane	Rep	Betsy Lane Cochrane	Rep
39th	James Forrester	Rep	James Forrester	Rep
40th	Leslie Winner†	Dem	Dan Clodfelter	Dem
41st	Larry Shaw	Dem	Larry Shaw	Dem
42nd	Bob Carpenter	Rep	Bob Carpenter	Rep

† - Incumbent not seeking re-election

Senate seats
Democratic	70.00%
Republican	30.00%

== See also ==
- List of North Carolina state legislatures
