= North Carolina General Assembly of 1999–2000 =

Legislative term in US state of North Carolina

144th North Carolina General Assembly 1999–2000
←	1997–98	2001–02	→
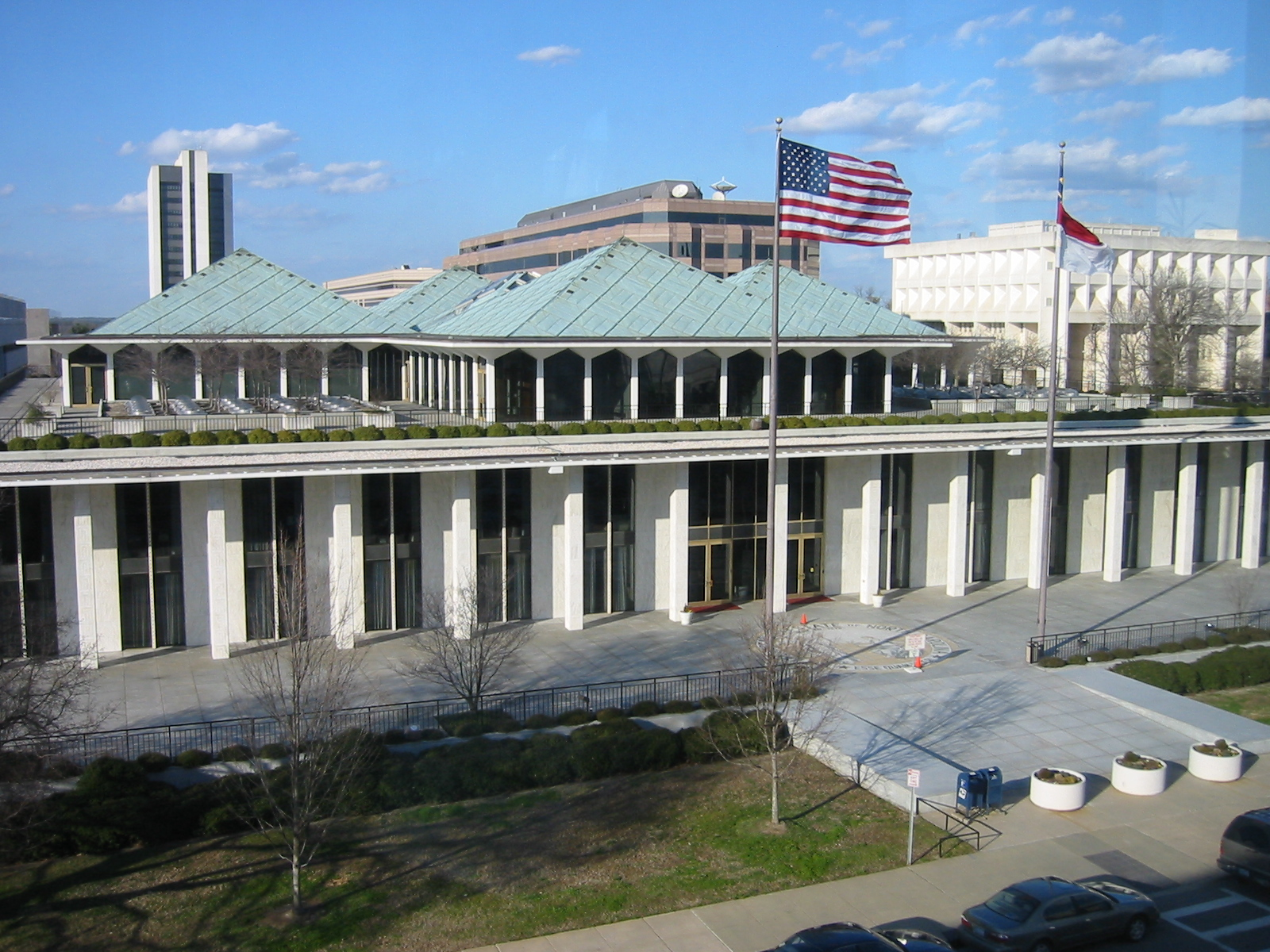
- North Carolina Legislative Building

Overview
- Legislative body: North Carolina General Assembly
- Jurisdiction: North Carolina, United States
- Meeting place: State Legislative Building in Raleigh
- Term: 1999–2000

North Carolina Senate
- Members: 50 senators
- President of the Senate: Dennis A. Wicker (Dem.)
- President pro tempore: Marc Basnight (Dem.)
- Minority Leader: Patrick J. Ballantine (Rep.)
- Party control: Democratic Party

North Carolina House of Representatives
- Members: 120 representatives
- Speaker of the House: James B. Black (Dem.)
- Minority Leader: N. Leo Daughtry (Rep.)
- Party control: Democratic Party

The North Carolina General Assembly of 1999–2000 was the 144th session of the North Carolina General General Assembly. The assembly is a bicameral body including a House of Representatives and Senate, which met during 1999 and 2000 in the State capital of Raleigh, North Carolina. Members of the 1999–2000 House and Senate were elected on November 3, 1998.

== House ==
=== House leadership ===
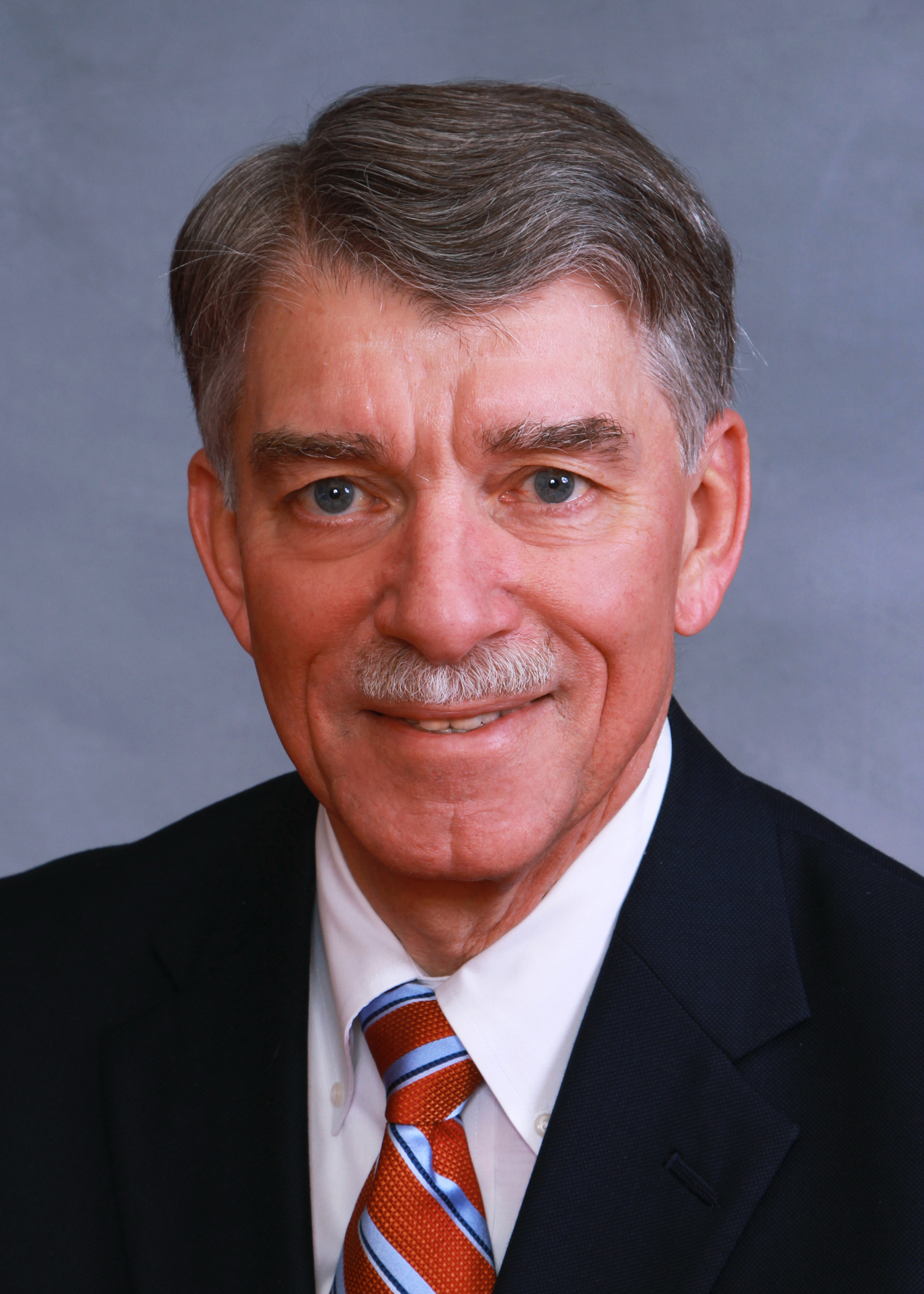
Speaker Pro Tempore Joe Hackney

North Carolina House officers
Position	Name	Party
Speaker	Jim Black	Democratic
Speaker pro tempore	Joe Hackney	Democratic

=== House members ===
There were 66 Democrats and 54 Republicans in the House. Members represented 98 districts and included 24 women, 17 African Americans and one Native-American. Members are listed below with their district, party affiliation, home town, and counties they represented:

District	Representative	Party	Residence	Counties represented
1st	Bill Owens	Democratic	Elizabeth City	Camden, Currituck, Pasquotank, Perquimans
2nd	Zeno Edwards	Democratic	Washington	Beaufort, Craven (part), Hyde, Pitt (part)
3rd	Scott Thomas	Democratic	New Bern	Craven (part), Pamlico
4th	Ronald Smith	Democratic	Atlantic Beach	Carteret, Onslow (part)
4th	Jean Preston	Republican	Emerald Isle	Carteret, Onslow (part)
5th	Howard Hunter Jr.	Democratic	Winton	Bertie (part), Gates, Hertford (part), Northampton
6th	Gene Rogers	Democratic	Williamston	Bertie (part), Hertford (part), Martin (Part), Pitt (part), Washington
7th	Thomas C. Hardaway (Note: resigned January 15, 2000.); John D. Hall (Note: Appointed February 4, 2000.)	Democratic	Enfield	Edgecombe (part), Halifax (part), Martin (part), Nash (part)
8th	Edith Warren	Democratic	Farmville	Edgecombe (part), Greene (part), Martin (part), Pitt (part)
9th	Marian McLawhorn	Democratic	Grifton	Greene (part), Pitt (part)
10th	Russell Tucker	Democratic	Pink Hill	Duplin, Jones, Onslow (part)
11th	Phil Baddour	Democratic	Goldsboro	Lenoir, Wayne
12th	Nurham Warwick	Democratic	Clinton	Onslow (part), Pender, Sampson (part)
13th	Danny McComas	Republican	Wilmington	New Hanover (part)
14th	Dewey Hill	Democratic	Whiteville	Brunswick, Columbus, New Hanover (part), Robeson (part)
14th	David Redwine	Democratic	Ocean Isle Beach	Brunswick, Columbus, New Hanover (part), Robeson (part)
15th	Sam Ellis	Republican	Raleigh	Wake (part)
16th	Douglas Yongue	Democratic	Laurinburg	Cumberland (part), Hoke, Moore, Robeson (part), Scotland
17th	Theodore James Kinney	Democratic	Fayetteville	Cumberland (part)
17th	Mary McAllister	Democratic	Fayetteville	Cumberland (part)
18th	John Hurley	Democratic	Fayetteville	Cumberland (part)
18th	Mia Morris	Republican	Fayetteville	Cumberland (part)
19th	Leslie Cox	Democratic	Sanford	Harnett, Lee, Sampson (part)
19th	Don Davis	Republican	Erwin	Harnett, Lee, Sampson (part)
20th	Billy Creech	Republican	Clayton	Franklin (part), Johnston, Nash (part)
21st	Dan Blue	Democratic	Raleigh	Wake (part)
22nd	Gordon Allen	Democratic	Roxboro	Franklin (part), Granville, Halifax (part), Person, Vance, Warren
22nd	Jim Crawford	Democratic	Oxford	Franklin (part), Granville, Halifax (part), Person, Vance, Warren
23rd	Mickey Michaux	Democratic	Durham	Durham
23rd	Paul Luebke	Democratic	Durham	Durham
23rd	George W. Miller Jr.	Democratic	Durham	Durham
24th	Joe Hackney	Democratic	Chapel Hill	Chatham, Orange (part)
24th	Verla Insko	Democratic	Chapel Hill	Chatham, Orange (part)
25th	Nelson Cole	Democratic	Reidsville	Alamance, Caswell, Orange (part), Rockingham
25th	Cary Allred	Republican	Burlington	Alamance, Caswell, Orange (part), Rockingham
25th	W. B. Teague	Republican	Liberty	Alamance, Caswell, Orange (part), Rockingham
26th	Alma Adams	Democratic	Greensboro	Guilford (part)
27th	Stephen W. Wood	Republican	High Point	Davidson (part), Guilford (part)
28th	Flossie Boyd-Mcintyre	Democratic	Jamestown	Guilford (part)
29th	Joanne Bowie	Republican	Guilford County	Guilford (part)
30th	Arlie Culp	Republican	Ramseur	Chatham (part), Guilford (part)
31st	Richard Morgan	Republican	Eagle Springs	Moore (part)
32nd	Wayne Goodwin	Democratic	Rockingham	Montgomery (part), Richmond, Scotland (part)
33rd	Pryor Gibson	Democratic	Troy	Anson, Montgomery (part), Stanly (part)
34th	O. Max Melton	Democratic	Monroe	Union (part)
35th	Charlotte Gardner	Republican	Salisbury	Rowan (part)
36th	Jim Black	Democratic	Matthews	Mecklenburg (part)
37th	Paul Reeves McCrary	Democratic	Lexington	Davidson (part)
38th	Harold Brubaker	Republican	Asheboro	Guilford (part), Randolph (part)
39th	Lyons Gray	Republican	Winston-Salem	Forsyth (part)
40th	Rex Baker	Republican	King	Alleghany, Ashe, Stokes, Surry, Watauga
40th	William Hiatt	Republican	Mt. Airy	Alleghany, Ashe, Stokes, Surry, Watauga
40th	Gene Wilson	Republican	Boone	Alleghany, Ashe, Stokes, Surry, Watauga
41st	George Holmes	Republican	Hamptonville	Alexander (part), Wilkes, Yadkin
41st	John Walter Brown	Republican	Elkin	Alexander (part), Wilkes, Yadkin
42nd	Frank Mitchell	Republican	Olin	Iredell (part)
43rd	Mitchell Setzer	Republican	Catawba	Catawba (part), Iredell (part)
44th	Daniel Barefoot	Democratic	Lincolnton	Gaston (part), Lincoln (part)
45th	Cherie Berry	Republican	Newton	Catawba (part), Gaston (part), Lincoln (part)
45th	Joe Kiser	Republican	Vale	Catawba (part), Gaston (part), Lincoln (part)
46th	Charles Buchanan	Republican	Green Mountain	Avery, Burke (part), Caldwell (part), Catawba (part), Mitchell
46th	Gregory Thompson	Republican	Spruce Pine	Avery, Burke (part), Caldwell (part), Catawba (part), Mitchell
47th	Walt Church	Democratic	Valdese	Burke (part)
48th	Debbie Clary	Republican	Cherryville	Cleveland, Gaston (part), Polk (part), Rutherford
48th	Andy Dedmon	Democratic	Earl	Cleveland, Gaston (part), Polk (part), Rutherford
48th	Jim Horn	Democratic	Shelby	Cleveland, Gaston (part), Polk (part), Rutherford
49th	Mitch Gillespie	Republican	Marion	Burke (part), McDowell, Yancey
50th	Larry Justus	Republican	Hendersonville	Henderson (part), Polk (part)
51st	Lanier Cansler	Republican	Asheville	Buncombe (part)
51st	Martin Nesbitt	Democratic	Asheville	Buncombe (part)
51st	Wilma Sherrill	Republican	Asheville	Buncombe (part)
52nd	Liston B. Ramsey	Democratic	Marshall	Graham, Haywood, Jackson (part), Madison, Swain
52nd	Phil Haire	Democratic	Sylva	Graham, Haywood, Jackson (part), Madison, Swain
53rd	James C. Carpenter (Note: resigned May 3, 2000.); Roger West (Note: Appointed May 5, 2000.)	Republican	Otto	Cherokee, Clay, Jackson (part), Macon
54th	Drew Saunders	Democratic	Huntersville	Mecklenburg (part)
55th	Ed McMahan	Republican	Charlotte	Mecklenburg (part)
56th	Martha Alexander	Democratic	Charlotte	Mecklenburg (part)
57th	Connie Wilson	Republican	Charlotte	Mecklenburg (part)
58th	Ruth Easterling	Democratic	Charlotte	Mecklenburg (part)
59th	Pete Cunningham	Democratic	Charlotte	Mecklenburg (part)
60th	Beverly Earle	Democratic	Charlotte	Mecklenburg (part)
61st	Charles Neely (Note: resigned April 7, 1999.); Art Pope (Note: Appointed April 13, 1999.)	Republican	Raleigh	Wake (part)
62nd	David Miner	Republican	Cary	Wake (part)
63rd	Jane Hurley Mosely (Note: died September 28, 1999.); Jennifer Weiss (Note: Appointed November 29, 1999.)	Democratic	Cary	Durham (part)
64th	Bob Hensley	Democratic	Raleigh	Wake (part)
65th	Rick Eddins	Republican	Raleigh	Wake (part)
66th	Larry Womble	Democratic	Winston-Salem	Forsyth (part)
67th	Warren Oldham	Democratic	Winston-Salem	Forsyth (part)
68th	Trudi Walend	Republican	Brevard	Buncombe (part), Henderson (part), Transylvania,
69th	Jim Gulley	Republican	Matthews	Mecklenburg (part)
70th	Toby Fitch	Democratic	Wilson	Edgecombe (part), Nash (part), Wilson (part)
71st	Joe Tolson	Democratic	Pinetops	Edgecombe (part), Nash (part), Pitt (part), Wilson (part)
72nd	Gene Arnold	Republican	Rocky Mount	Nash (part), Wilson (part)
73rd	Wayne Sexton	Republican	Stoneville	Forsyth (part), Rockingham (part)
74th	Julia Craven Howard	Republican	Mocksville	Davidson (part), Davie
75th	Alex Warner	Democratic	Hope Mills	Cumberland (part)
76th	John Bridgeman	Democratic	Gastonia	Gaston (part), Mecklenburg (part)
77th	Carolyn Russell	Republican	Goldsboro	Greene (part), Lenoir (part), Wayne (part)
78th	Stanley Fox	Democratic	Oxford	Granville (part), Vance (part), Warrant (part)
79th	William Wainwright	Democratic	Havelock	Craven (part), Jones (part), Lenoir (part), Pamlico (part)
80th	Robert Grady	Republican	Jacksonville	Onslow (part)
81st	Tim Tallent	Republican	Concord	Cabarrus (part), Union (part)
82nd	Bobby Barbee	Republican	Locust	Cabarrus (part), Stanly (part), Union (part)
83rd	Gene McCombs	Republican	Faith	Rowan (part)
84th	Michael Decker	Republican	Walkertown	Forsyth (part), Guilford (part)
85th	Ronnie Sutton	Democratic	Pembroke	Hoke (part) Robeson (part)
86th	Bill Culpepper	Democratic	Edenton	Chowan, Dare, Perquimans (part), Tyrrell, Washington (part)
87th	Donald Bonner	Democratic	Rowland	Hoke (part), Robeson (part), Scotland (part)
88th	Theresa Esposito	Republican	Winston-Salem	Forsyth (part)
89th	Mary Jarrell	Democratic	High Point	Guilford (part)
89th	Maggie Jeffus	Democratic	Greensboro	Guilford (part)
90th	Richard Lee Moore (Note: resigned May 7, 2000.); Len Sossamon (Note: Appointed May 17, 2000.)	Democratic	Kannapolis	Cabarrus (part)
91st	Edgar Starnes	Republican	Granite Falls	Alexander (part), Caldwell (part), Catawba (part)
92nd	Russell Capps	Republican	Raleigh	Durham (part), Wake (part)
93rd	John Rayfield	Republican	Belmont	Gaston (part), Mecklenburg (part)
94th	Jerry Dockham	Republican	Denton	Davidson (part), Randolph (part)
95th	Leo Daughtry	Republican	Smithfield	Johnston (part)
96th	Edd Nye	Democratic	Elizabethtown	Bladen, Cumberland (part), New Hanover (part), Pender (part), Sampson (part)
97th	Jerry Braswell (Note: resigned February 11, 2000.); Jimmie Ford (Note: Appointed March 21, 2000.)	Democratic	Goldsboro	Duplin (part), Sampson (part), Wayne (part)
98th	Thomas Wright	Democratic	Wilmington	Brunswick (part), Columbus (part), New Hanover (part), Pender (part)

== State Senate ==
=== Leaders ===
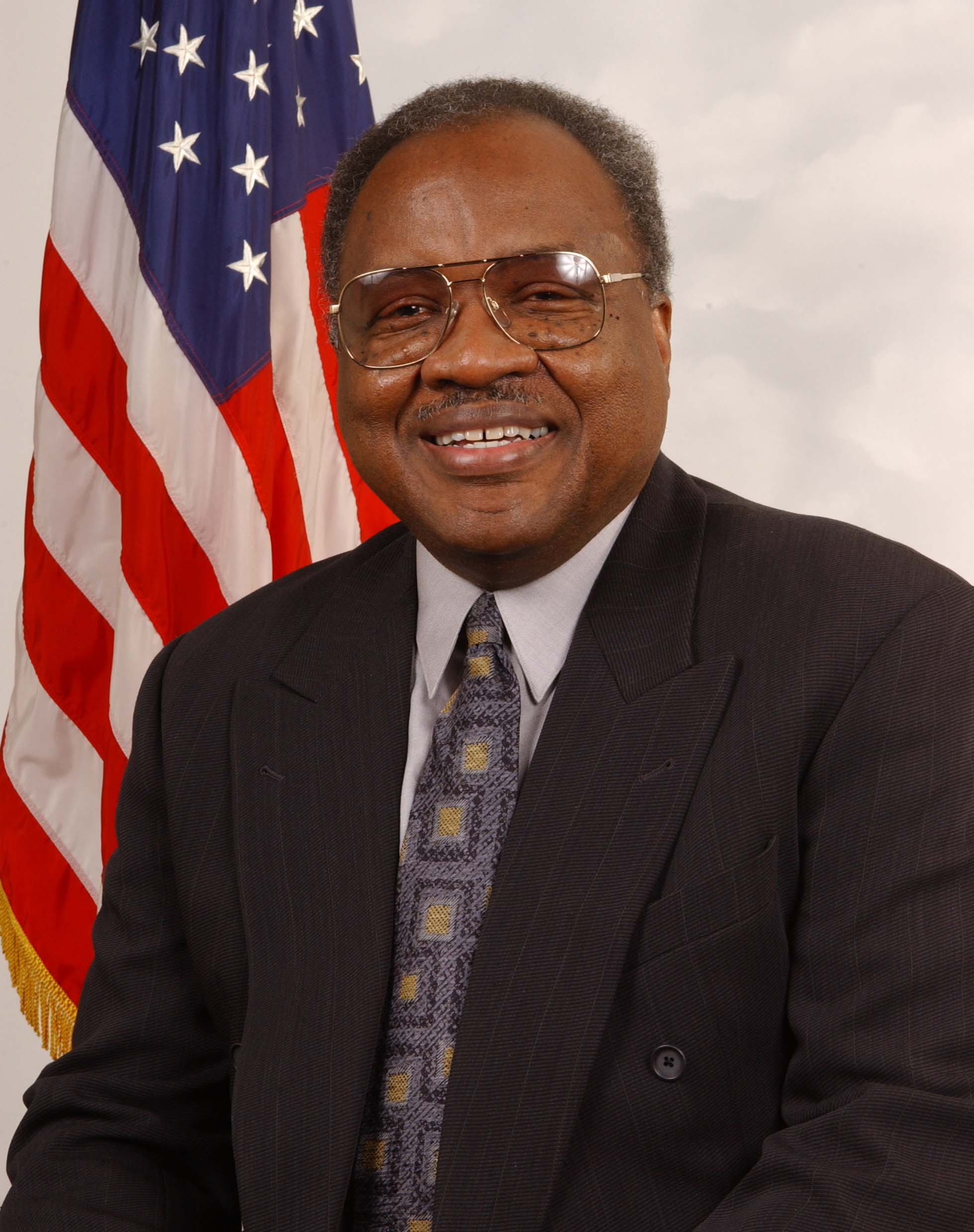
Deputy President Pro Tempore Frank Ballance

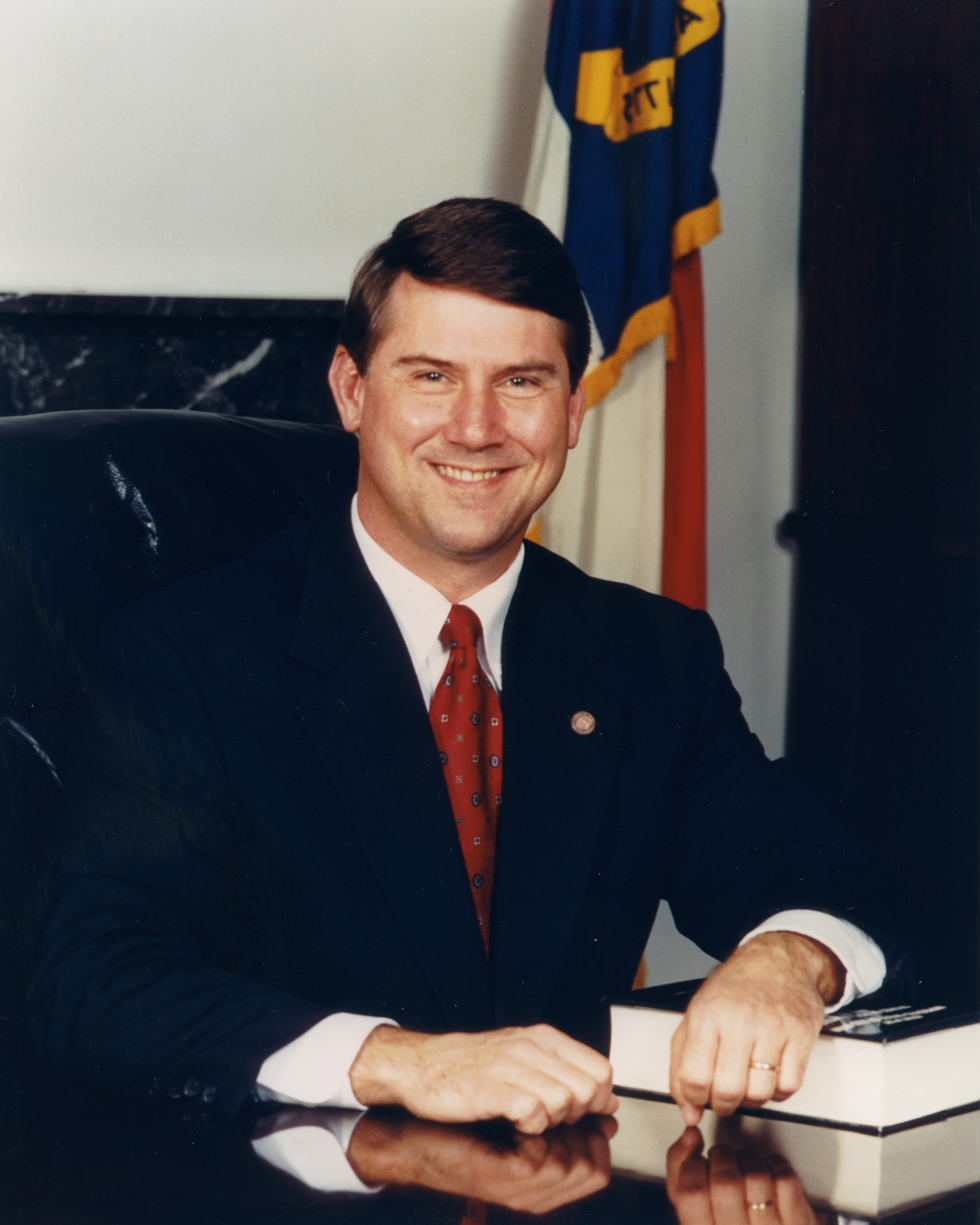
President of the Senate Dennis A. Wicker

North Carolina Senate officers
Position	Name	Party
President Pro Tem	Marc Basnight	Democratic
Deputy President Pro Tempore	Frank Ballance	Democratic
Majority Leader	Roy Cooper	Democratic
Majority Whip	Luther Jordan	Democratic
Minority Leader	Patrick J. Ballantine	Republican
Minority Whip	James Forrester	Republican

=== Members ===
There were 50 senators, including 35 Democrats, 15 Republicans, 45 men, seven women, and seven African Americans. There were 42 districts, and some districts had two senators (12, 13, 14, 16, 17, 20, 27, and 28). The Senate members included the following:

District	Senator	Party	Residence	Counties represented	First elected
1st	Marc Basnight	Democratic	Manteo	Bertie (part), Chowan, Perquimans, Pasquotank, Camden, Currituck, Dare, Tyrrell, Washington (part), Beaufort (part), Hyde	1984
2nd	Frank Ballance	Democratic	Warrenton	Vance (part), Warren, Halifax (part), Northampton, Bertie (part), Hertford, Gates	1988
3rd	Bev Perdue	Democratic	New Bern	Carteret (part), Craven, Pamlico	1990
4th	Patrick J. Ballantine	Republican	Wilmington	Carteret (part), Onslow (part), Pender (part), New Hanover (part)	1994
5th	Charles W. Albertson	Democratic	Beulaville	Sampson (part), Duplin, Pender (part), Onslow (part), Jones (part)	1992
6th	R. L. "Bob" Martin	Democratic	Bethel	Wilson (part), Edgecombe (part), Pitt (part), Martin (part), Washington (part)	1984
7th	Luther Jordan	Democratic	Wilmington	Lenoir (part), Jones (part), Onslow (part), Pender (part), New Hanover (part)	1992
8th	John H. Kerr III	Democratic	Goldsboro	Lenoir (part), Wayne, Greene	1992
9th	Edward N. "Ed" Warren	Democratic	Greenville	Lenoir (part), Pitt (part), Martin (part), Beaufort (part)	1990
10th	Roy Cooper	Democratic	Rocky Mount	Edgecombe (part), Wilson (part), Nash, Halifax (part)	1990
11th	Allen Wellons	Democratic	Smithfield	Wilson (part), Johnston (part), Franklin, Vance (part)	1996
12th	Don W. East	Republican	Pilot Mountain	Watauga, Ashe, Alleghany, Surry, Stokes, Rockingham, Guilford (part)	1994
12th	Virginia Foxx	Republican	Banner Elk	Watauga, Ashe, Alleghany, Surry, Stokes, Rockingham, Guilford (part)	1994
13th	Wib Gulley	Democratic	Durham	Person (part), Granville, Durham, Wake (part)	1992
13th	Jeanne Hopkins Lucas	Democratic	Durham	Person (part), Granville, Durham, Wake (part)	1992
14th	Brad Miller	Democratic	Raleigh	Wake (part)	1996
14th	Eric Miller Reeves	Democratic	Raleigh	Wake (part)	1996
15th	Oscar Harris	Democratic	Dunn	Lee (part), Harnett, Johnston (part), Sampson (part)	1998
16th	Eleanor Kinnaird	Democratic	Carrboro	Randolph (part), Moore, Lee (part), Chatham, Orange	1996
16th	Howard Lee	Democratic	Chapel Hill	Randolph (part), Moore, Lee (part), Chatham, Orange	1996
17th	Aaron W. Plyler	Democratic	Monroe	Stanly (part), Union, Anson, Montgomery, Richmond, Scotland, Hoke (part)	1982
17th	William R. Purcell	Democratic	Laurinburg	Stanly (part), Union, Anson, Montgomery, Richmond, Scotland, Hoke (part)	1997↑
18th	R. C. Soles Jr.	Democratic	Tabor City	Bladen (part), Columbus, Brunswick, New Hanover (part)	1976
19th	Robert G. "Bob" Shaw	Republican	Greensboro	Guilford (part), Davidson (part), Randolph (part)	1984
20th	Hamilton C. Horton Jr.	Republican	Winston-Salem	Forsyth (part)	1994
20th	Linda Garrou	Democratic	Winston-Salem	Forsyth (part)	1998
21st	Hugh Webster	Republican	Burlington	Alamance, Caswell, Person (part)	1994
22nd	Fletcher L. Hartsell Jr.	Republican	Concord	Rowan (part), Cabarrus, Stanly (part)	1990
23rd	Jim Phillips Sr.	Democratic	Lexington	Iredell (part), Rowan (part), Davidson County (part)	1996
24th	Tony Rand	Democratic	Fayetteville	Cumberland (part)	1994
25th	David W. Hoyle	Democratic	Dallas	Cleveland (part), Lincoln (part), Gaston (part)	1992
26th	Austin M. Allran	Republican	Hickory	Catawba, Lincoln (part)	1986
27th	John A. Garwood	Republican	North Wilkesboro	Mitchell, Avery, Burke (part), Caldwell, Alexander, Wilkes, Yadkin	1996
27th	Kenneth R. "Ken" Moore	Republican	Lenoir	Mitchell, Avery, Burke (part), Caldwell, Alexander, Wilkes, Yadkin	1996
28th	Steve Metcalf	Democratic	Weaverville	Buncombe (part), Madison, Yancey, McDowell, Burke (part)	1998
28th	Charles Newell Carter	Democratic	Asheville	Buncombe (part), Madison, Yancey, McDowell, Burke (part)	1998
29th	Dan Robinson	Democratic	Cullowhee	Macon (part), Swain, Jackson (part), Haywood (part), Transylvania (part), Henderson (part)	1998
30th	David F. Weinstein	Democratic	Lumberton	Hoke (part), Robeson, Bladen (part), Cumberland (part), Sampson (part)	1996
31st	William N. "Bill" Martin	Democratic	Greensboro	Guilford (part)	1982
32nd	Kay Hagan	Democratic	Greensboro	Guilford (part)	1998
33rd	Charlie Dannelly	Democratic	Charlotte	Mecklenburg (part)	1994
34th	T. L. "Fountain" Odom	Democratic	Charlotte	Mecklenburg (part), Lincoln (part)	1988
35th	Bob Rucho	Republican	Matthews	Mecklenburg (part)	1996
36th	John H. Carrington	Republican	Raleigh	Wake (part)	1994
37th	Walter Dalton	Democratic	Rutherfordton	Rutherford, Cleveland (part)	1996
38th	Betsy Lane Cochrane	Republican	Mocksville	Forsyth (part), Davie, Davidson (part), Rowan (part)	1992
39th	James Forrester	Republican	Stanley	Gaston (part), Lincoln (part), Iredell (part)	1990
40th	Dan Clodfelter	Democratic	Charlotte	Mecklenburg (part)	1998
41st	Larry Shaw	Democratic	Fayetteville	Cumberland (part)	1996
42nd	Robert C. Carpenter	Republican	Franklin	Graham, Cherokee, Clay, Macon (part), Jackson (part), Haywood (part), Buncombe (part), Transylvania (part), Henderson (part), Polk	1988

- ↑: Member was first appointed to office.

== See also ==
- List of North Carolina state legislatures
