= Herbert Hyde =

American politician

Member of the North Carolina Senate
- In office 1991–1995
- Preceded by: Robert S. Swain
- Succeeded by: R. L. Clark
- Constituency: 28th district
- In office 1965–1967
- Constituency: 35th district

Member of the North Carolina House of Representatives from the 43rd district
- In office 1973–1977
- Succeeded by: James M. Clarke

Personal details
- Born: Herbert Lee Hyde; December 12, 1925 Bryson City, North Carolina, United States
- Died: October 15, 2006 (aged 80) Asheville, North Carolina, United States
- Party: Democratic
- Spouse: Kathryn Long (m. 1949)
- Education: Western Carolina University; New York University

Military service
- Branch/service: United States Navy
- Battles/wars: World War II

Herbert Lee Hyde (December 12, 1925 – October 15, 2006) was an American lawyer and politician who served in both houses of the North Carolina General Assembly.
