= Gladys A. Robinson =

American politician

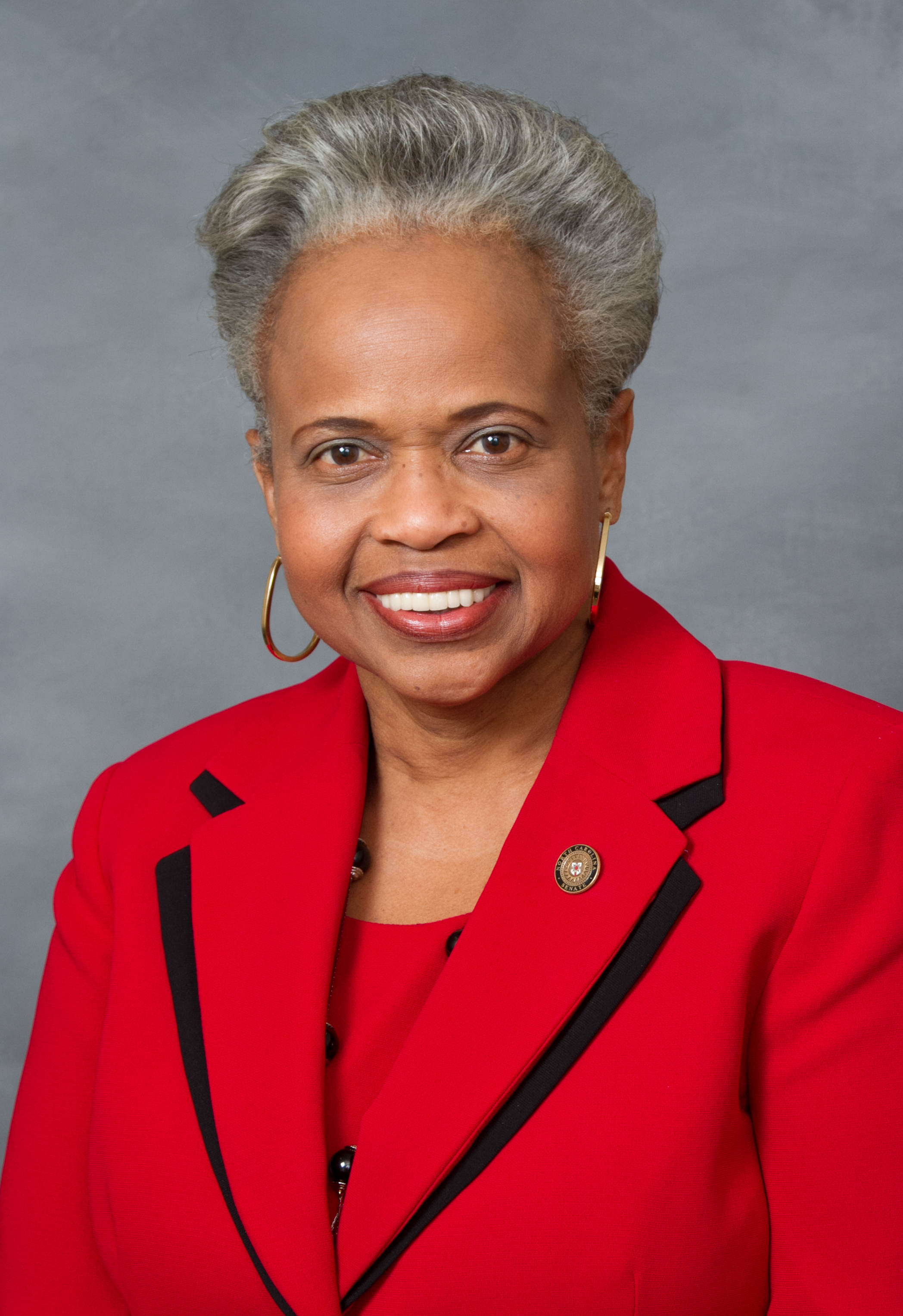

Member of the North Carolina Senate from the 28th district
- Incumbent
- Assumed office January 1, 2011
- Preceded by: Katie Dorsett

Personal details
- Born: November 17, 1949 (age 77)
- Party: Democratic
- Spouse(s): Ladison (deceased, 2008)
- Children: 2
- Education: Bennett College; MA, PhD North Carolina A&T
- Occupation: Health services executive
- Website: gladysarobinson.com

Gladys Ashe Robinson (born November 17, 1949) is a health services executive and serves as a Democratic State Senator for the 28th district (parts of Guilford County, North Carolina) in the North Carolina General Assembly. She serves as a Deputy Minority Leader and was first elected in 2010.

== Education and career ==
Robinson graduated from Bennett College and received her Masters and PhD from North Carolina A&T.

She became the executive director of the Piedmont Health Services and Sickle Cell Agency in 1982. She is a member of the University of North Carolina Board of Governors and is a former trustee of Bennett College.

== Political career ==
In 2010, she filed for the Democratic nomination to run for the 28th state Senate district that was occupied at the time by Katie G. Dorsett. Dorsett withdrew on the last day of filing and left Robinson to only face Evelyn W. Miller. Robinson won the nomination with 75% of the vote. She went on to face Republican Trudy Wade and fellow Democrat Bruce Davis (who ran as an unaffiliated candidate to protest Robinson's nomination). Robinson was elected with 47.8% of the vote.

In 2012, Robinson faced a primary challenge from Davis. She won the nomination again 72%–28%. Robinson was unopposed in the general election.

During the 2013–2014 session, she was chosen as Deputy Minority Leader in the Senate.

Only one other candidate filed to challenge Robinson in 2014. Melvin "Skip" Alston was a Democratic former Guilford County Commissioner. Robinson won the Democratic primary 59% to 41%. She ran unopposed in the general election.

== Personal life ==
Robinson lives in Greensboro and has two daughters. Her husband, Ladison Robinson, died in 2008. Robinson is African-American.

North Carolina Senate
Preceded by Katie Dorsett	Member of the North Carolina Senate from the 28th district 2011-present	Incumbent
