= North Carolina's 49th Senate district =

American legislative district

North Carolina's 49th State Senate district
Senator
Julie Mayfield; D–Asheville
- Demographics: 79% White; 6% Black; 9% Hispanic; 1% Asian; 4% Multiracial
- Population (2023): 205,454

North Carolina's 49th Senate district is one of 50 districts in the North Carolina Senate. It has been represented by Democrat Julie Mayfield since 2021.

== Geography ==
Since 2003, the district has covered most of Buncombe County. The district overlaps with the 114th, 115th, and 116th state house districts.

== District officeholders since 2003 ==
Senator	Party	Dates	Notes	Counties
District created January 1, 2003.				2003–Present; Part of Buncombe County.
Steve Metcalf (Asheville)	Democratic	January 1, 2003 – February 2, 2004	Redistricted from the 28th district. Resigned.	2003–Present; Part of Buncombe County.
Vacant		February 2, 2004 - February 6, 2004		2003–Present; Part of Buncombe County.
Martin Nesbitt (Asheville)	Democratic	February 6, 2004 – March 6, 2014	Appointed to finish Metcalf's term. Died.	2003–Present; Part of Buncombe County.
Vacant		March 6, 2014 - April 15, 2014		2003–Present; Part of Buncombe County.
Terry Van Duyn (Asheville)	Democratic	April 15, 2014 – January 1, 2021	Appointed to finish Nesbitt's term. Retired to run for Lieutenant Governor.	2003–Present; Part of Buncombe County.
Julie Mayfield (Asheville)	Democratic	January 1, 2021 – Present		2003–Present; Part of Buncombe County.

== Election results ==
=== 2024 ===
North Carolina Senate 49th district general election, 2024
Party	Candidate	Votes	%
Democratic	Julie Mayfield (incumbent)	81,037	69.07%
Republican	Kristie Tincher Sluder	36,288	30.93%
Total votes		117,325	100%
Democratic hold			

=== 2022 ===
North Carolina Senate 49th district Democratic primary election, 2022
Party	Candidate	Votes	%
Democratic	Julie Mayfield (incumbent)	16,055	68.25%
Democratic	Sandra Kilgore	4,869	20.70%
Democratic	Taylon Breeden	2,599	11.05%
Total votes		23,523	100%

North Carolina Senate 48th district general election, 2022
Party	Candidate	Votes	%
Democratic	Julie Mayfield (incumbent)	56,351	65.70%
Republican	John Anderson	29,417	34.30%
Total votes		85,768	100%
Democratic hold			

=== 2020 ===
North Carolina Senate 49th district Democratic primary election, 2020
Party	Candidate	Votes	%
Democratic	Julie Mayfield	32,120	67.53%
Democratic	Ben Scales	8,856	18.62%
Democratic	Travis Smith	6,588	13.85%
Total votes		47,564	100%

North Carolina Senate 49th district general election, 2020
Party	Candidate	Votes	%
Democratic	Julie Mayfield	80,159	62.72%
Republican	Bob Penland	47,647	37.28%
Total votes		127,806	100%
Democratic hold			

=== 2018 ===
North Carolina Senate 49th district general election, 2018
Party	Candidate	Votes	%
Democratic	Terry Van Duyn (incumbent)	61,092	63.70%
Republican	Mark Crawford	32,519	33.91%
Libertarian	Lyndon John Smith	2,290	2.39%
Total votes		95,901	100%
Democratic hold			

=== 2016 ===
North Carolina Senate 49th district general election, 2016
Party	Candidate	Votes	%
Democratic	Terry Van Duyn (incumbent)	71,828	74.43%
Libertarian	William Meredith	24,672	25.57%
Total votes		96,500	100%
Democratic hold			

=== 2014 ===
North Carolina Senate 49th district Republican primary election, 2014
Party	Candidate	Votes	%
Republican	Mark Crawford	2,656	42.82%
Republican	R. L. Clark	2,504	40.37%
Republican	Clarence E. Young	1,043	16.81%
Total votes		6,203	100%

North Carolina Senate 49th district general election, 2014
Party	Candidate	Votes	%
Democratic	Terry Van Duyn (incumbent)	42,347	61.29%
Republican	Mark Crawford	26,745	38.71%
Total votes		69,092	100%
Democratic hold			

=== 2012 ===
North Carolina Senate 49th district Republican primary election, 2012
Party	Candidate	Votes	%
Republican	R. L. Clark	11,927	81.04%
Republican	Chancellor von Henner	2,791	18.96%
Total votes		14,718	100%

North Carolina Senate 49th district general election, 2012
Party	Candidate	Votes	%
Democratic	Martin Nesbitt (incumbent)	61,826	61.96%
Republican	R. L. Clark	37,953	38.04%
Total votes		99,779	100%
Democratic hold			

=== 2010 ===
North Carolina Senate 49th district Republican primary election, 2010
Party	Candidate	Votes	%
Republican	R. L. Clark	2,357	56.04%
Republican	Don Yelton	1,849	43.96%
Total votes		4,206	100%

North Carolina Senate 49th district general election, 2010
Party	Candidate	Votes	%
Democratic	Martin Nesbitt (incumbent)	33,254	59.37%
Republican	R. L. Clark	22,757	40.63%
Total votes		56,011	100%
Democratic hold			

=== 2008 ===
North Carolina Senate 49th district general election, 2008
Party	Candidate	Votes	%
Democratic	Martin Nesbitt (incumbent)	56,150	65.64%
Republican	R. L. Clark	29,391	34.36%
Total votes		85,541	100%
Democratic hold			

=== 2006 ===
North Carolina Senate 49th district Republican primary election, 2006
Party	Candidate	Votes	%
Republican	R. L. Clark	1,850	72.46%
Republican	Brian Cooper	703	27.54%
Total votes		2,553	100%

North Carolina Senate 49th district general election, 2006
Party	Candidate	Votes	%
Democratic	Martin Nesbitt (incumbent)	36,901	65.64%
Republican	R. L. Clark	19,318	34.36%
Total votes		56,219	100%
Democratic hold			

=== 2004 ===
North Carolina Senate 49th district general election, 2004
Party	Candidate	Votes	%
Democratic	Martin Nesbitt (incumbent)	43,727	61.40%
Republican	R. L. Clark	27,492	38.60%
Total votes		71,669	100%
Democratic hold			

=== 2002 ===
North Carolina Senate 49th district general election, 2002
Party	Candidate	Votes	%
Democratic	Steve Metcalf (incumbent)	26,459	55.93%
Republican	R. L. Clark	20,845	44.07%
Total votes		47,304	100%
Democratic hold			
