= Julie Mayfield =

American attorney and politician

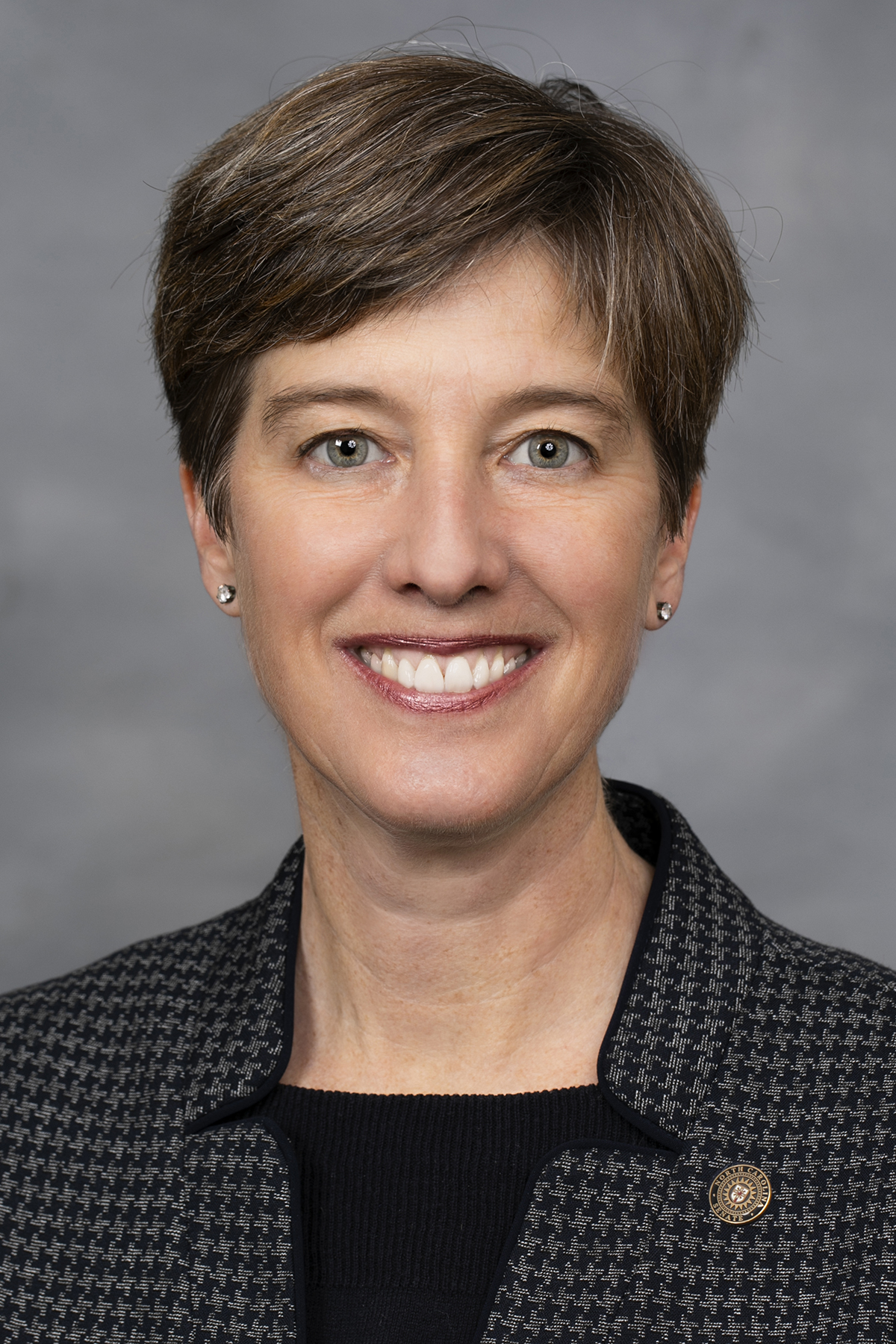

Member of the North Carolina Senate from the 49th district
- Incumbent
- Assumed office January 1, 2021
- Preceded by: Terry Van Duyn

Personal details
- Born: April 5, 1967 (age 59) Atlanta, Georgia, United States
- Party: Democratic
- Education: Davidson College (BA); Emory University School of Law (JD)

Julie Virginia Mayfield (born April 5, 1967) is an American attorney and politician serving as a Democratic member of the North Carolina Senate from the 49th district.

== Early life and education ==
Mayfield was born in Atlanta, Georgia. She graduated from Northside High School, then Davidson College with a Bachelor of Arts in religion, and earned her Juris Doctor from the Emory University School of Law.

== Career ==
Mayfield worked as an Intern/Death Penalty Program Assistant at Amnesty International USA between 1989 and 1991. She was a program assistant at the Atlanta Community Food Bank between 1992 and 1993. In 1993, she worked as an intern at the Georgia Justice Project. Mayfield was an associate of Kilpatrick Stockton Limited Liability Partnership between 1996 and 1999. In 1999, she worked as a law clerk for Chief Judge Robert Castellani. She was a director at the Turner Environmental Law Clinic at the Emory University School of Law between 1999 and 2003.

Mayfield was Vice President/General Counsel of the Georgia Conservancy between 2003 and 2008. Since 2008, she has been executive director of MountainTrue.

== Political career ==
In 2015, Mayfield was elected to the Asheville City Council as a member of the Democratic Party.

Mayfield announced her candidacy for state senate at the county Democratic Party's annual convention on March 23, 2019. She won the Democratic Primary on March 3, 2020. Mayfield went on to win the general on November 3, 2020 to represent the 49th Senate district. She was sworn into office on January 1, 2021. She sits on the Appropriations on Agriculture, Natural and Economic Resources Committee, the Senate State and Local Government Committee, and the Senate Transportation Committee.

North Carolina Senate
Preceded by Terry Van Duyn	Member of the North Carolina Senate from the 49th district 2021-present	Incumbent
