= Katie G. Dorsett =

American politician (1932–2020)

Katie Dorsett

Member of the North Carolina Senate from the 28th district
- In office January 1, 2003 – January 1, 2011
- Preceded by: Bill Martin (Redistricting)
- Succeeded by: Gladys Robinson

Secretary of Administration of North Carolina
- In office January 1, 1993 – January 1, 2001
- Governor: Jim Hunt
- Preceded by: James F. Lofton
- Succeeded by: Gwynn T. Sinson

Personal details
- Born: July 8, 1932 Shaw, Mississippi, U.S.
- Died: July 6, 2020 (aged 87) Greensboro, North Carolina, U.S.
- Party: Democratic
- Spouse: Warren
- Education: Alcorn State University (BS); Indiana University Bloomington (MS); University of North Carolina at Greensboro (EdD)
- Profession: Educator

Katie Grays Dorsett (July 8, 1932 – July 6, 2020) was a Democratic member of the North Carolina General Assembly representing the state's twenty-eighth Senate district from 2003 to 2010. Her district included constituents in Guilford County, North Carolina. In the 2009–10 session, Dorsett served as the Majority Whip in the Senate.

== Education and career ==
Dorsett was born in Shaw, Mississippi. She attended local public schools up to the eighth grade and then a private boarding school. Dorsett attended Alcorn State University for her undergraduate work and then earned her master's from Indiana University Bloomington. After attending several schools in pursuit of her doctorate, she eventually finished at the University of North Carolina at Greensboro in 1975. Dorsett taught business at North Carolina State A&T University in Greensboro, North Carolina, from 1955 until 1987.

== Political career ==
After retiring from A&T after 32 years of service, she served two terms on the Greensboro City Council from 1983 to 1986, the first African American woman ever elected. She then served as a Democratic Guilford County Commissioner starting in 1990. Dorsett represented District 9 until 1992, when she was appointed Secretary of the Department of Administration by North Carolina Governor Jim Hunt. This position made her the first African American woman to hold a North Carolina Cabinet post. She was elected to the state Senate in 2002.

Just before filing ended in 2010, she announced that she would not seek re-election. She was inducted into the North Carolina Women's Hall of Fame in 2010. She died on July 6, 2020, two days before her 88th birthday.

North Carolina Senate
Preceded by Steve Metcalf; Charles Newell Carter	Member of the North Carolina Senate from the 28th district 2003–2011	Succeeded by Gladys Robinson
