= R. L. Clark =

American politician (1930–2020)

R L Clark (November 21, 1930 – June 8, 2020) was an American politician.

Clark was born in Spring Creek, North Carolina in Madison County, North Carolina and graduated from Spring Creek High School. He received his bachelor's and master's degrees from Western Carolina University. Clark lived in Asheville, North Carolina and was a businessman. Clark served in the North Carolina Senate from 1995 to 1998 and was a Republican. Clark died in Asheville, North Carolina.

== Notes ==
North Carolina Senate
Preceded by Herbert Hyde; Dennis Jay Winner	Member of the North Carolina Senate from the 28th district 1995–1999; Served alongside: Jesse Ingram Ledbetter	Succeeded by Charles Newell Carter; Steve Metcalf
