= Jim Phillips Sr. =

American politician

Member of the North Carolina Senate from the 23rd district
- In office January 1, 1997 – January 1, 2001
- Preceded by: Paul Sanders Smith
- Succeeded by: Cal Cunningham

Personal details
- Born: Jimmie Watkins Phillips; July 31, 1931 Tarboro, North Carolina
- Died: May 23, 2018 (aged 86) Lexington, North Carolina
- Party: Democratic
- Spouse: Carolyn Winberry
- Education: University of North Carolina at Chapel Hill; High Point University (no degree)

Military service
- Allegiance: United States
- Branch/service: United States Marine Corps
- Battles/wars: Korean War

Jimmie Watkins "Jim" Phillips, Sr. (July 21, 1931 – May 25, 2018) was an American politician who served in the North Carolina Senate from 1997 to 2001. A Democrat, he represented senate district 23.

== Early life and education ==
Phillips was born in Tarboro, North Carolina. He was raised in Bassett, Virginia and graduated from Bassett High School. He served in the United States Marine Corps during the Korean War. He then attended to University of North Carolina at Chapel Hill and High Point University.

== Career ==
From 1960 to 1974, Phillips served as director of transportation for the Davidson County Schools. In 1974, Phillips served as Davidson County manager. From 1978 to 1994, he served as an aide to Congressman Stephen L. Neal.

== Personal life ==
Phillips lived in Lexington, North Carolina. He died at his home in Lexington, North Carolina on May 25, 2018.

North Carolina Senate
Preceded by Paul Sanders Smith	Member of the North Carolina Senate from the 23rd district 1997-2001	Succeeded by Cal Cunningham
