= Charles Newell Carter =

American politician

Charles Carter

Member of the North Carolina Senate from the 28th district
- In office January 1, 1999 – January 1, 2003 Serving with Steve Metcalf
- Preceded by: Jesse Ledbetter; R. L. Clark
- Succeeded by: Tom Apodaca (Redistricting)

Personal details
- Born: Charles Newell Carter Jr. May 9, 1967 (age 59) Asheville, North Carolina, U.S.
- Party: Democratic
- Education: Oglethorpe University (BA)

Charles Newell Carter Jr. (born May 9, 1967) is a Democratic politician from North Carolina who served two terms in the North Carolina General Assembly.

Carter was born in Asheville, North Carolina and graduated from Asheville School. He earned a bachelor's degree in international studies and history from Oglethorpe University, after which he taught in the public schools of Buncombe County. In 1996, he ran unsuccessfully for the North Carolina Senate in the 28th Senate District. In 1998 and 2000, Carter was elected to the Senate, and he served through 2002.

More recently, he opened several Port City Java cafes in the Asheville area. In May, 2007, Charles Carter broke away from the Port City Java corporation and created a locally owned chain of cafes known as Mountain Java. Mountain Java is now closed.

Carter also serves on the advisory board of the North Carolina DonorsChoose organization.

North Carolina Senate
Preceded by Jesse I. Ledbetter; R. L. Clark	Member of the North Carolina Senate from the 28th district 1999-2003; Served alongside: Steve Metcalf	Succeeded by Katie Dorsett
