= Luther Jordan =

American politician

Luther Henry Jordan, Jr. (1 June 1950 – 23 April 2002) was a Democratic politician from North Carolina and a senior member of the North Carolina General Assembly.

Jordan was born in New York City and moved to North Carolina as a child. He graduated from New Hanover High School in 1969 and received training in mortuary science at Gupton Jones College. He ran a funeral home business in Wilmington, North Carolina and served on the Wilmington City Council for 15 years. Jordan was elected to the North Carolina Senate in 1993 and served in that body until his death in 2002. Jordan earned a bachelor's degree from Shaw University in 1997, at the age of 46. From 1999 to 2002, he served as the Senate Democratic majority whip.
