= Dan Robinson (politician) =

American politician from North Carolina and football coach (1926–2022)

Member of the North Carolina Senate from the 29th district
- In office January 1, 1999 – January 1, 2003
- Preceded by: Thomas K. Jenkins
- Succeeded by: Robert C. Carpenter (redistricting)

Personal details
- Born: July 17, 1926 Marion, North Carolina, U.S.
- Died: February 11, 2022 (aged 95) Cullowhee, North Carolina, U.S.
- Party: Democratic
- Spouse: Jean Williams
- Children: three
- Education: Western Carolina University, Peabody College
- Profession: professor and coach
- Coaching career

Playing career
- 1946–1949: Western Carolina
- Position: Tackle

Coaching career (HC unless noted)
- 1950: Western Carolina (freshman)
- 1951: Greenwood HS (SC)
- 1952–1955: Morganton HS (NC)
- 1956–1968: Western Carolina

Head coaching record
- Overall: 51–67–6 (college)

McDaniel Robinson (July 17, 1926 – February 11, 2022) was an American politician and college football coach. He served as a member of the Democratic Party in the North Carolina Senate from 1999 to 2002, representing District 29. Robinson was defeated by fellow senator Robert C. Carpenter of the Republican Party after redistricting. He was the head football coach at Western Carolina University from 1956 to 1968, compiling a record of 51–67–6.

Robinson was born in Marion, North Carolina, in 1926. He attended Western Carolina University, where he played college football as a tackle from 1946 to 1949 before graduating with a graduating with a Bachelor of Science. Robinson served in the United States Navy during World War II.

Robinson died on February 11, 2022, in Cullowhee, North Carolina, at the age of 95.

== Head coaching record ==
=== College ===
Year	Team	Overall	Conference	Standing	Bowl/playoffs
Western Carolina Catamounts (North State Conference / Carolinas Conference) (1956–1968)
1956	Western Carolina	1–9	0–5	7th	
1957	Western Carolina	2–5–1	2–2–1	4th	
1958	Western Carolina	1–8–1	1–4–1	6th	
1959	Western Carolina	7–2–1	4–2	3rd	
1960	Western Carolina	6–5	2–4	T–4th	
1961	Western Carolina	4–6	2–5	7th	
1962	Western Carolina	3–5–1	1–4–1	T–5th	
1963	Western Carolina	2–6–1	1–5	6th	
1964	Western Carolina	5–4	4–2	2nd	
1965	Western Carolina	7–2	5–2	3rd	
1966	Western Carolina	5–5	3–4	6th	
1967	Western Carolina	4–5–1	2–4–1	T–6th	
1968	Western Carolina	4–5	3–3	T–3rd	
Western Carolina:		51–67–6	30–46–4		
Total:		51–67–6			

North Carolina Senate
Preceded by Thomas K. Jenkins	Member of the North Carolina Senate from the 29th district 1999–2003	Succeeded by Jerry Tillman
