= Steve Metcalf =

American lobbyist and politician

Stephen Michael Metcalf is an American lobbyist and former politician. He was a Democratic member of the North Carolina General Assembly representing the state's forty-ninth Senate district, including constituents in Buncombe county.

A management consultant from Asheville, North Carolina, earned degrees from Appalachian State University and the University of Tennessee in political science. He served in the United States Army as a chaplain's assistant, and was the first county manager of Buncombe County, North Carolina. Metcalf served in the administration of Governor Jim Hunt as deputy secretary of governmental operations and deputy secretary of the North Carolina Department of Transportation before being elected to the state legislature in 1998.

Metcalf was re-elected to the State Senate twice, and served as chair of the Senate Education Committee. During his time in office, Metcalf accepted a job as director of local government relations at Western Carolina University. Metcalf resigned his Senate seat effective 2 February 2004; he had previously declined to run for a fourth term in the legislature. Representative Martin Nesbitt was appointed by Governor Mike Easley to fill Metcalf's seat.

Metcalf now owns a government relations firm in North Carolina called the Policy Group.

North Carolina Senate
Preceded by R. L. Clark; Jesse Ingram Ledbetter	Member of the North Carolina Senate from the 28th district 1999–2003; Served alongside: Charles Newell Carter	Succeeded by Katie Dorsett
Preceded by Constituency established	Member of the North Carolina Senate from the 49th district 2003–2004	Succeeded by Martin Nesbitt
