= Aaron W. Plyler =

American businessman and politician

Aaron Plyler

Personal details
- Born: Aaron Wesley Plyler; 1 October 1926 Monroe, North Carolina
- Died: 23 August 2016 (aged 89) Monroe, North Carolina
- Party: Democratic
- Education: Florida Military Academy
- Profession: Businessman

Aaron Wesley Plyler (1 October 1926 – 23 August 2016) was an American businessman and politician.

Born in Monroe, North Carolina, Plyler went to the Benton Heights School and to the Florida Military Academy. He was involved with farming and real estate. Plyler was president of Plyler Grading and Paving Company. Plyler served as a Democratic member of the North Carolina House of Representatives, from 1974 to 1982 and then served in the North Carolina State Senate from 1982 to 2002. Plyler died at his home in Monroe, North Carolina.
