= North Carolina's 28th Senate district =

American legislative district

North Carolina's 28th State Senate district
Senator
Gladys Robinson; D–Greensboro
- Demographics: 36% White; 44% Black; 11% Hispanic; 4% Asian; 1% Other; 4% Multiracial
- Population (2023): 208,257

North Carolina's 28th Senate district is one of 50 districts in the North Carolina Senate. It has been represented by Democrat Gladys Robinson since 2011.

== Geography ==
Since 2003, the district has included part of Guilford County. The district overlaps with the 57th, 58th, and 61st state house districts.

== District officeholders ==
=== Multi-member district ===
Senator	Party	Dates	Notes	Senator	Party	Dates	Notes	Counties
District created January 1, 1983.								1983–1993; All of Buncombe, Madison, Yancey, and McDowell counties.
Robert Swain (Asheville)	Democratic	January 1, 1983 – January 1, 1991	Redistricted from the 26th district.	Dennis Winner (Asheville)	Democratic	January 1, 1983 – January 1, 1995	Lost re-election.	1983–1993; All of Buncombe, Madison, Yancey, and McDowell counties.
Herbert Hyde (Asheville)	Democratic	January 1, 1991 – January 1, 1995	Lost re-election.	Dennis Winner (Asheville)	Democratic	January 1, 1983 – January 1, 1995	Lost re-election.	1983–1993; All of Buncombe, Madison, Yancey, and McDowell counties.
Herbert Hyde (Asheville)	Democratic	January 1, 1991 – January 1, 1995	Lost re-election.	Dennis Winner (Asheville)	Democratic	January 1, 1983 – January 1, 1995	Lost re-election.	1993–2003; All of Madison, Yancey, and McDowell counties. Parts of Buncombe and Burke counties.
Jesse Ledbetter (Asheville)	Republican	January 1, 1995 – January 1, 1999	Lost re-election.	R. L. Clark (Asheville)	Republican	January 1, 1995 – January 1, 1999	Lost re-election.	1993–2003; All of Madison, Yancey, and McDowell counties. Parts of Buncombe and Burke counties.
Steve Metcalf (Asheville)	Democratic	January 1, 1999 – January 1, 2003	Redistricted to the 49th district.	Charles Newell Carter (Asheville)	Democratic	January 1, 1999 – January 1, 2003	Redistricted to the 48th district and retired.	1993–2003; All of Madison, Yancey, and McDowell counties. Parts of Buncombe and Burke counties.

=== Single-member district ===
Senator	Party	Dates	Notes	Counties
Katie Dorsett (Greensboro)	Democratic	January 1, 2003 – January 1, 2011	Retired.	2003–Present; Part of Guilford County.
Gladys Robinson (Greensboro)	Democratic	January 1, 2011 – Present		2003–Present; Part of Guilford County.

== Election results ==
=== 2024 ===
North Carolina Senate 28th district general election, 2024
Party	Candidate	Votes	%
Democratic	Gladys Robinson (incumbent)	78,876	100%
Total votes		78,876	100%
Democratic hold			

=== 2022 ===
North Carolina Senate 28th district general election, 2022
Party	Candidate	Votes	%
Democratic	Gladys Robinson (incumbent)	46,455	73.05%
Republican	Paul Schumacher	17,140	26.95%
Total votes		63,595	100%
Democratic hold			

=== 2020 ===
North Carolina Senate 28th district general election, 2020
Party	Candidate	Votes	%
Democratic	Gladys Robinson (incumbent)	75,640	76.34%
Republican	D. R. King	23,440	23.66%
Total votes		99,080	100%
Democratic hold			

=== 2018 ===
North Carolina Senate 28th District general election, 2018
Party	Candidate	Votes	%
Democratic	Gladys Robinson (incumbent)	56,262	75.25%
Republican	Clark Porter	18,509	24.75%
Total votes		74,771	100%
Democratic hold			

=== 2016 ===
North Carolina Senate 28th district general election, 2016
Party	Candidate	Votes	%
Democratic	Gladys Robinson (incumbent)	74,232	83.88%
Republican	Devin R. King	14,265	16.12%
Total votes		88,497	100%
Democratic hold			

=== 2014 ===
North Carolina Senate District 28th district Democratic primary election, 2014
Party	Candidate	Votes	%
Democratic	Gladys Robinson (incumbent)	8,277	59.36%
Democratic	Skip Alston	5,667	40.64%
Total votes		13,944	100%

North Carolina Senate 28th district general election, 2014
Party	Candidate	Votes	%
Democratic	Gladys Robinson (incumbent)	43,286	100%
Total votes		43,286	100%
Democratic hold			

=== 2012 ===
North Carolina Senate District 28th district Democratic primary election, 2012
Party	Candidate	Votes	%
Democratic	Gladys Robinson (incumbent)	16,516	71.96%
Democratic	Bruce Davis	6,437	28.04%
Total votes		22,953	100%

North Carolina Senate 28th district general election, 2012
Party	Candidate	Votes	%
Democratic	Gladys Robinson (incumbent)	80,689	100%
Total votes		80,689	100%
Democratic hold			

=== 2010 ===
North Carolina Senate District 28th district Democratic primary election, 2010
Party	Candidate	Votes	%
Democratic	Gladys Robinson	4,702	74.65%
Democratic	Evelyn W. Miller	1,597	25.35%
Total votes		6,299	100%

North Carolina Senate District 28th district Republican primary election, 2010
Party	Candidate	Votes	%
Republican	Trudy Wade	2,790	64.64%
Republican	Jeffrey A. Brommer	938	21.73%
Republican	Robert Brafford Jr.	347	8.04%
Republican	John Wayne Welch	241	5.58%
Total votes		4,316	100%

North Carolina Senate 28th district general election, 2010
Party	Candidate	Votes	%
Democratic	Gladys Robinson	21,496	47.84%
Republican	Trudy Wade	17,383	38.69%
Independent	Bruce Davis	6,054	13.47%
Total votes		44,933	100%
Democratic hold			

=== 2008 ===
North Carolina Senate District 28th district Democratic primary election, 2008
Party	Candidate	Votes	%
Democratic	Katie Dorsett (incumbent)	20,534	64.95%
Democratic	Bruce Davis	11,083	35.05%
Total votes		31,617	100%

North Carolina Senate District 28th district general election, 2008
Party	Candidate	Votes	%
Democratic	Katie Dorsett (incumbent)	61,911	100%
Total votes		61,911	100%
Democratic hold			

=== 2006 ===
North Carolina Senate District 28th district Democratic primary election, 2006
Party	Candidate	Votes	%
Democratic	Katie Dorsett (incumbent)	3,025	88.71%
Democratic	Carlton Roberson	385	11.29%
Total votes		3,410	100%

North Carolina Senate District 28th district general election, 2006
Party	Candidate	Votes	%
Democratic	Katie Dorsett (incumbent)	20,955	100%
Total votes		20,955	100%
Democratic hold			

=== 2004 ===
North Carolina Senate District 28th district general election, 2004
Party	Candidate	Votes	%
Democratic	Katie Dorsett (incumbent)	47,583	100%
Total votes		47,583	100%
Democratic hold			

=== 2002 ===
North Carolina Senate 28th district general election, 2002
Party	Candidate	Votes	%
Democratic	Katie Dorsett	26,395	64.01%
Republican	Mike Causey	14,139	34.29%
Libertarian	Eric Preston Medlock	702	1.70%
Total votes		41,236	100%
Democratic hold			

=== 2000 ===
North Carolina Senate 28th district general election, 2000
Party	Candidate	Votes	%
Democratic	Steve Metcalf (incumbent)	62,571	27.17%
Democratic	Charles Newell Carter (incumbent)	60,691	26.35%
Republican	Jesse Ledbetter	52,469	22.78%
Republican	R. L. Clark	50,702	22.01%
Libertarian	Clarence Young	3,903	1.69%
Total votes		230,336	100%
Democratic hold			
Democratic hold			
