= North Carolina's 6th House district =

American legislative district

North Carolina's 6th State House of Representatives district
Representative
Joe Pike; R–Spout Springs
- Demographics: 56% White; 21% Black; 15% Hispanic; 1% Asian; 1% Native American; 1% Other; 5% Multiracial
- Population (2024): 92,794

North Carolina's 6th House district is one of 120 districts in the North Carolina House of Representatives. It has been represented by Republican Joe Pike since 2023.

== Geography ==
Since 2023, the district has included part of Harnett County. The district overlaps with the 12th Senate district.

== District officeholders ==
=== Multi-member district ===
Representative	Party	Dates	Notes	Representative	Party	Dates	Notes	Counties
District created January 1, 1967.
Emmett Burden (Aulander)	Democratic	January 1, 1967 – January 1, 1969	Redistricted from the Bertie County district.	Roberts Jernigan Jr. (Ahoskie)	Democratic	January 1, 1967 – January 1, 1973	Redistricted to the 5th district.	1967–1973; All of Northampton, Bertie, and Hertford counties.
Perry Martin (Rich Square)	Democratic	January 1, 1969 – January 1, 1973		Roberts Jernigan Jr. (Ahoskie)	Democratic	January 1, 1967 – January 1, 1973	Redistricted to the 5th district.	1967–1973; All of Northampton, Bertie, and Hertford counties.
C. Kitchin Josey (Scotland Neck)	Democratic	January 1, 1973 – January 1, 1977	Redistricted from the 7th district.	J. A. Everett (Palmyra)	Democratic	January 1, 1973 – January 1, 1975	Redistricted from the 7th district.	1973–1983; All of Halifax and Martin counties.
C. Kitchin Josey (Scotland Neck)	Democratic	January 1, 1973 – January 1, 1977	Redistricted from the 7th district.	George Cullipher (Williamston)	Democratic	January 1, 1975 – January 1, 1981		1973–1983; All of Halifax and Martin counties.
George Hux (Halifax)	Democratic	January 1, 1977 – January 1, 1983		George Cullipher (Williamston)	Democratic	January 1, 1975 – January 1, 1981		1973–1983; All of Halifax and Martin counties.
George Hux (Halifax)	Democratic	January 1, 1977 – January 1, 1983		William Harrison (Williamston)	Democratic	January 1, 1981 – January 1, 1983		1973–1983; All of Halifax and Martin counties.

=== Single-member district ===
Representative	Party	Dates	Notes	Counties
John Gillam III (Windsor)	Democratic	January 1, 1983 – January 1, 1985	Redistricted from the 5th district.	1983–1993; Parts of Pitt, Martin, Bertie, Chowan and Hertford counties.
L. M. Brinkley (Ahoskie)	Democratic	January 1, 1985 – January 1, 1987		1983–1993; Parts of Pitt, Martin, Bertie, Chowan and Hertford counties.
Gene Rogers (Williamston)	Democratic	January 1, 1987 – January 1, 2003	Redistricted to the 4th district and retired.	1983–1993; Parts of Pitt, Martin, Bertie, Chowan and Hertford counties.
Gene Rogers (Williamston)	Democratic	January 1, 1987 – January 1, 2003	Redistricted to the 4th district and retired.	1993–2003; Parts of Pitt, Martin, Washington, Bertie, and Hertford counties.
Arthur Williams (Washington)	Democratic	January 1, 2003 – January 1, 2011	Lost re-election.	2003–2005; All of Hyde, Beaufort, and Washington counties.
Arthur Williams (Washington)	Democratic	January 1, 2003 – January 1, 2011	Lost re-election.	2005–2013; All of Beaufort County. Part of Pitt County.
Bill Cook (Chocowinity)	Republican	January 1, 2011 – January 1, 2013	Retired to run for State Senate.	2005–2013; All of Beaufort County. Part of Pitt County.
Paul Tine (Kitty Hawk)	Democratic	January 1, 2013 – January 7, 2015	Switched parties. Retired.	2013–2019; All of Dare, Hyde, and Washington counties. Part of Beaufort County.
Paul Tine (Kitty Hawk)	Independent	January 7, 2015 – January 1, 2017	Switched parties. Retired.	2013–2019; All of Dare, Hyde, and Washington counties. Part of Beaufort County.
Beverly Boswell (Kitty Hawk)	Republican	January 1, 2017 – January 1, 2019	Lost re-nomination.	2013–2019; All of Dare, Hyde, and Washington counties. Part of Beaufort County.
Bobby Hanig (Powells Point)	Republican	January 1, 2019 – August 29, 2022	Resigned to assume seat in the State Senate.	2019–2023; All of Currituck, Dare, Hyde, and Pamlico counties.
Vacant		August 29, 2022 – September 19, 2022		2019–2023; All of Currituck, Dare, Hyde, and Pamlico counties.
Paul O'Neal (Waterlily)	Republican	September 19, 2022 – January 1, 2023	Appointed to finish Hanig's term. Redistricted to the 1st district and retired.	2019–2023; All of Currituck, Dare, Hyde, and Pamlico counties.
Joe Pike (Spout Springs)	Republican	January 1, 2023 – Present		2023–Present; Part of Harnett County.

== Election results ==
=== 2026 ===
North Carolina House of Representatives 6th district Democratic primary election, 2026
Party	Candidate	Votes	%
Democratic	Tony Spears	2,489	60.32%
Democratic	Joshua Estep	1,637	39.68%
Total votes		4,126	100%

North Carolina House of Representatives 6th district Republican primary election, 2026
Party	Candidate	Votes	%
Republican	Joe Pike (incumbent)	2,139	53.39%
Republican	W. H. (Bill) Morris	1,867	46.61%
Total votes		4,006	100%

North Carolina House of Representatives 6th district general election, 2026
Party	Candidate	Votes	%
Republican	Joe Pike (incumbent)		
Democratic	Tony Spears		
Total votes			100%

=== 2024 ===
North Carolina House of Representatives 6th district general election, 2024
Party	Candidate	Votes	%
Republican	Joe Pike (incumbent)	24,190	60.64%
Democratic	Kiara Johnson	15,704	39.36%
Total votes		39,894	100%
Republican hold			

=== 2022 ===
North Carolina House of Representatives 6th district Republican primary election, 2022
Party	Candidate	Votes	%
Republican	Joe Pike	1,667	51.23%
Republican	Murray Simpkins	1,587	48.77%
Total votes		3,254	100%

North Carolina House of Representatives 6th district general election, 2022
Party	Candidate	Votes	%
Republican	Joe Pike	11,591	60.64%
Democratic	Kiara Johnson	7,522	39.36%
Total votes		19,113	100%
Republican win (new seat)			

=== 2020 ===
North Carolina House of Representatives 6th district Republican primary election, 2020
Party	Candidate	Votes	%
Republican	Bobby Hanig (incumbent)	6,148	70.76%
Republican	Rob Rollason	2,540	29.24%
Total votes		8,688	100%

North Carolina House of Representatives 6th district general election, 2020
Party	Candidate	Votes	%
Republican	Bobby Hanig (incumbent)	31,063	64.34%
Democratic	Tommy Fulcher	17,216	35.66%
Total votes		48,279	100%
Republican hold			

=== 2018 ===
North Carolina House of Representatives 6th district Republican primary election, 2018
Party	Candidate	Votes	%
Republican	Bobby Hanig	3,626	53.03%
Republican	Beverly Boswell (incumbent)	3,212	46.97%
Total votes		6,838	100%

North Carolina House of Representatives 6th district general election, 2018
Party	Candidate	Votes	%
Republican	Bobby Hanig	18,573	55.03%
Democratic	Tess Judge	15,177	44.97%
Total votes		33,750	100%
Republican hold			

=== 2016 ===
North Carolina House of Representatives 6th district Democratic primary election, 2016
Party	Candidate	Votes	%
Democratic	Warren Judge	7,517	71.73%
Democratic	Judy Justice	2,962	28.27%
Total votes		10,479	100%

North Carolina House of Representatives 6th district Republican primary election, 2016
Party	Candidate	Votes	%
Republican	Beverly Boswell	3,834	39.27%
Republican	Ashley Woolard	3,586	36.73%
Republican	Arthur Williams	2,342	23.99%
Total votes		9,762	100%

North Carolina House of Representatives 6th district general election, 2016
Party	Candidate	Votes	%
Republican	Beverly Boswell	22,022	51.83%
Democratic	Warren Judge	20,471	48.17%
Total votes		42,493	100%
Republican gain from Independent			

=== 2014 ===
North Carolina House of Representatives 6th district Republican primary election, 2014
Party	Candidate	Votes	%
Republican	Mattie Lawson	2,980	53.60%
Republican	Ashley Woolard	2,580	46.40%
Total votes		5,560	100%

North Carolina House of Representatives 6th district general election, 2014
Party	Candidate	Votes	%
Democratic	Paul Tine (incumbent)	16,523	53.57%
Republican	Mattie Lawson	14,319	46.43%
Total votes		30,842	100%
Democratic hold			

=== 2012 ===
North Carolina House of Representatives 6th district Republican primary election, 2012
Party	Candidate	Votes	%
Republican	Mattie Lawson	2,677	37.32%
Republican	Arthur Williams	2,585	36.04%
Republican	Jeremy D. Adams	1,911	26.64%
Total votes		7,173	100%

North Carolina House of Representatives 6th district general election, 2012
Party	Candidate	Votes	%
Democratic	Paul Tine	20,756	50.56%
Republican	Mattie Lawson	20,298	49.44%
Total votes		41,054	100%
Democratic gain from Republican			

=== 2010 ===
North Carolina House of Representatives 6th district general election, 2010
Party	Candidate	Votes	%
Republican	Bill Cook	12,910	53.45%
Democratic	Arthur Williams (incumbent)	11,242	46.55%
Total votes		24,152	100%
Republican gain from Democratic			

=== 2008 ===
North Carolina House of Representatives 6th district general election, 2008
Party	Candidate	Votes	%
Democratic	Arthur Williams (incumbent)	25,038	100%
Total votes		25,038	100%
Democratic hold			

=== 2006 ===
North Carolina House of Representatives 6th district general election, 2006
Party	Candidate	Votes	%
Democratic	Arthur Williams (incumbent)	10,716	62.73%
Republican	Hood Richardson	6,368	37.27%
Total votes		17,084	100%
Democratic hold			

=== 2004 ===
North Carolina House of Representatives 6th district general election, 2004
Party	Candidate	Votes	%
Democratic	Arthur Williams (incumbent)	16,192	54.96%
Republican	Al Klemm	13,272	45.04%
Total votes		29,464	100%
Democratic hold			

=== 2002 ===
North Carolina House of Representatives 6th district Democratic primary election, 2002
Party	Candidate	Votes	%
Democratic	Arthur Williams	5,436	51.57%
Democratic	Daniel Mallison III	5,106	48.43%
Total votes		10,542	100%

North Carolina House of Representatives 6th district Republican primary election, 2002
Party	Candidate	Votes	%
Republican	Hood Richardson	1,713	51.41%
Republican	Al Klemm	1,619	48.59%
Total votes		3,332	100%

North Carolina House of Representatives 6th district general election, 2002
Party	Candidate	Votes	%
Democratic	Arthur Williams	11,287	53.91%
Republican	Hood Richardson	9,648	46.09%
Total votes		20,935	100%
Democratic hold			

=== 2000 ===
North Carolina House of Representatives 6th district general election, 2000
Party	Candidate	Votes	%
Democratic	Gene Rogers (incumbent)	12,985	63.82%
Republican	Edwin W. Congleton	7,361	36.18%
Total votes		20,346	100%
Democratic hold			
