= Howard Hunter =

Howard Hunter may refer to:

- Howard J. Hunter Jr. (1946–2007), member of the United States House of Representatives
- Howard J. Hunter III, member of the North Carolina General Assembly
- Howard W. Hunter (1907–1995), fourteenth president of The Church of Jesus Christ of Latter-day Saints
- Lt. Howard Hunter, character in Hill Street Blues
- Howard Hunter, law professor and president of Singapore Management University, 2004–2010
