= Bobby Hanig =

American politician from North Carolina

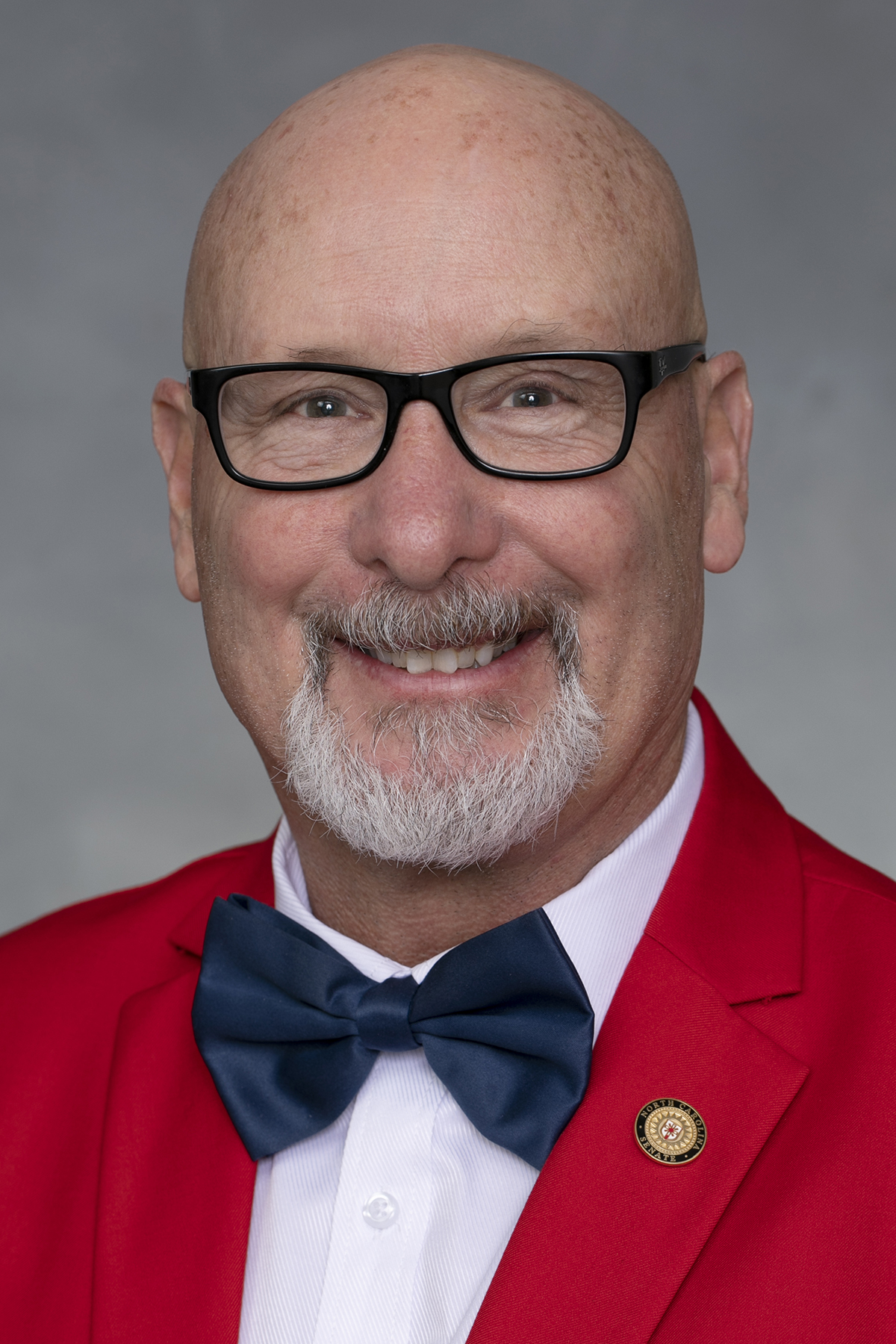
- Official portrait, 2023

Member of the North Carolina Senate
- In office August 29, 2022 – August 24, 2026
- Preceded by: Bob Steinburg
- Succeeded by: Jerry Tillett
- Constituency: 1st district (2022–2023, 2025–2026); 3rd district (2023–2025)

Member of the North Carolina House of Representatives from the 6th district
- In office January 1, 2019 – August 29, 2022
- Preceded by: Beverly Boswell
- Succeeded by: Paul O'Neal

Personal details
- Born: 1963 or 1964 (age 62–63) Virginia Beach, Virginia, U.S.
- Party: Republican

Military service
- Branch/service: United States Army

Robert Otho Hanig (born 1963/1964) is an American politician who is a former member of the North Carolina Senate, representing District 1. He was appointed by North Carolina Governor Roy Cooper to serve the remainder of Senator Bob Steinburg's term representing District 1 following Sen. Steinburg's resignation to seek the Republican nomination in Senate District 2. Hanig was first elected to the North Carolina House of Representatives after defeating incumbent Beverly Boswell in the primary election for House District 6. Hanig is an Army veteran and owns The Pool Guy Aquatic Services.

== Career ==
After serving in the U.S. Army, Hanig moved to North Carolina's Outer Banks, where he worked in the rental property sector. He later established a swimming pool service company and expanded into property management, operating businesses that were connected to the local tourism industry and homeowners in the area.

== Politics ==
=== Currituck County Commissioner ===
In 2016, Hanig was encouraged to run for Currituck County Commissioner, where he served the 2nd district from December 5, 2016, to December 3, 2018, succeeding David Griggs. He was succeeded by Selina Jarvis.

Hanig was elected to the Currituck Board of Commissioners after running unopposed in the Republican primary in March 2016. He was elected as chairman in December 2016. As commissioner, Hanig expressed his dislike for solar farms in Currituck County, by saying "[l]arge solar projects haven't been a good deal for Currituck County residents."

He voted in 2017 to ban all future solar facility development.

After moving to the North Carolina House of Representatives, the Currituck Republican Party selected educator Selina Jarvis as their nominee to replace Bobby Hanig on the county Board of Commissioners.

=== North Carolina General Assembly ===
Hanig defeated Rep. Beverly Boswell in a Republican primary.

Hanig defeated Tess Judge by 55%–45% in the general election.

Hanig sponsored six bills in his first term. The bills included one that gave the College of the Albemarle the liberty to use state funds for building projects along with Dare County for educational facilities. Another bill was for the isolated schools in Currituck county and improving the transportation efficiency budget for the schools in Currituck County. Another bill passed by Hanig dealt with local regulation of navigable water and the restoration of the Federal Protecting Tenants at Foreclosure Act. Also, a bill to make the bottlenose dolphin North Carolina's marine mammal was passed the House through him and it was directed to the Senate Rules Committee.

==== 2020 election ====
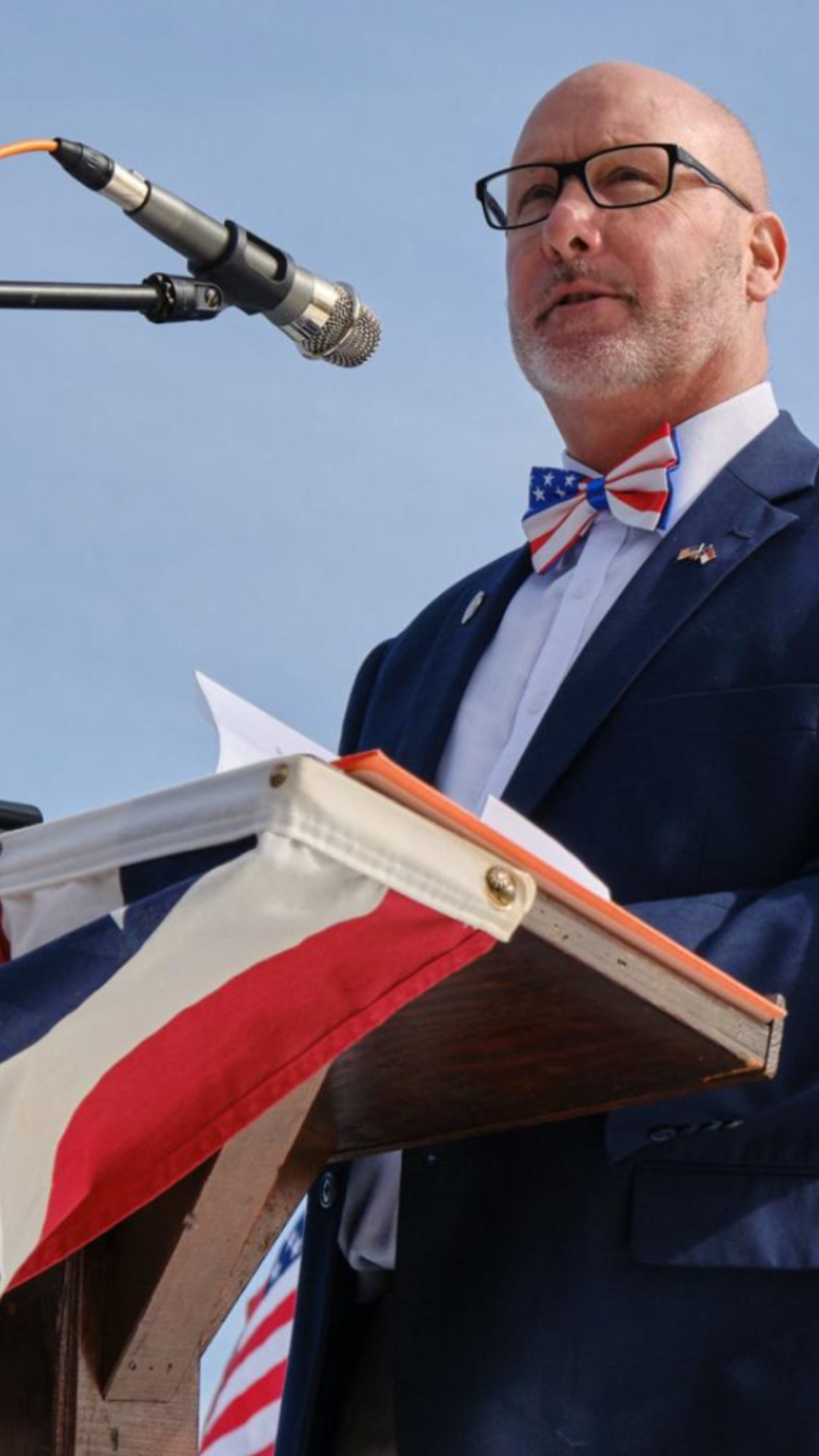
Bobby Hanig announces reelection campaign

Hanig beat Rob Rollason in March 2020. During the campaign, Hanig and Rollason talked about local issues like wind and solar energy projects.

Hanig was a supporter of the Dare County Board of Commissioners declaring the county a Second Amendment Sanctuary.

In January 2020, the Currituck County commissioners adopted a resolution declaring the county a Second Amendment Refuge, adding Currituck to a growing list of North Carolina counties seeking to support a citizen's right to bear arms. Hanig spoke in support of the resolution. Hanig urged the board, he formerly chaired, to support the resolution, saying he would oppose any "assault" on the Second Amendment in the General Assembly.

=== North Carolina State Senate ===
Following redistricting in the North Carolina General Assembly after the 2020 United States Census, Hanig's 6th district was dismantled. Most of Hanig's constituents were drawn into the 79th district represented by two term Republican representative Keith Kidwell, but Hanig's home in Powells Point was drawn into the 1st district, represented by another two term Republican Representative, Ed Goodwin. Instead of facing Goodwin or Kidwell in a GOP primary, Hanig instead announced he would run for the North Carolina Senate in District 3 in 2022. Following Bob Steinburg's resignation on July 31, 2022, Hanig was appointed to finish the balance of his term in the state senate. Hanig announced his reelection bid for the state senate in October 2023. He resigned from the chamber in August 2026, citing opportunities outside the legislature.

== 2026 U.S. House election ==
In September 2025, Hanig announced his candidacy for North Carolina's 1st congressional district in the 2026 election. He placed third in the primary election.

== Electoral history ==
Currituck County Board of Commissioners 2nd district general election, 2016
Party	Candidate	Votes	%
Republican	Bobby Hanig	9,408	100%
Total votes		9,408	100%
Republican hold			

North Carolina House of Representatives 6th district Republican primary election, 2018
Party	Candidate	Votes	%
Republican	Bobby Hanig	3,626	53.03%
Republican	Beverly Boswell (incumbent)	3,212	46.97%
Total votes		6,838	100%

North Carolina House of Representatives 6th district general election, 2018
Party	Candidate	Votes	%
Republican	Bobby Hanig	18,573	55.03%
Democratic	Tess Judge	15,177	44.97%
Total votes		33,750	100%
Republican hold			

North Carolina House of Representatives 6th district Republican primary election, 2020
Party	Candidate	Votes	%
Republican	Bobby Hanig (incumbent)	6,148	70.76%
Republican	Rob Rollason	2,540	29.24%
Total votes		8,688	100%

North Carolina House of Representatives 6th district general election, 2020
Party	Candidate	Votes	%
Republican	Bobby Hanig (incumbent)	31,063	64.34%
Democratic	Tommy Fulcher	17,216	35.66%
Total votes		48,279	100%
Republican hold			

North Carolina Senate 3rd district general election, 2022
Party	Candidate	Votes	%
Republican	Bobby Hanig (incumbent)	37,984	52.53%
Democratic	Valerie Jordan	34,320	47.47%
Total votes		72,304	100%
Republican gain from Democratic			
