= CHEC =

CHEC may refer to:

- Cape Hatteras Electric Cooperative
- Cape Higher Education Consortium
- China Harbour Engineering
- CHLB-FM, a radio station in Lethbridge, Alberta, previously known as CHEC
