= North Carolina's 5th House district =

American legislative district

North Carolina's 5th State House of Representatives district
Representative
Bill Ward; R–Elizabeth City
- Demographics: 53% White; 36% Black; 5% Hispanic; 1% Asian; 1% Other; 4% Multiracial
- Population (2024): 82,045

North Carolina's 5th House district is one of 120 districts in the North Carolina House of Representatives. It has been represented by Republican Bill Ward since 2023.

== Geography ==
Since 2023, the district has included all of Hertford, Gates, Pasquotank, and Camden counties. The district overlaps with the 1st Senate district.

== District officeholders ==
=== Multi-member district ===
Representative	Party	Dates	Notes	Representative	Party	Dates	Notes	Counties
District created January 1, 1967.
William Hill II (Wilmington)	Democratic	January 1, 1967 – January 1, 1969		George Clark Jr. (Wilmington)	Republican	January 1, 1967 – January 1, 1969	Redistricted from the New Hanover County district.	1967–1973; All of New Hanover County.
Howard Penton Jr. (Wilmington)	Democratic	January 1, 1969 – January 1, 1973		Edward Snead (Wilmington)	Democratic	January 1, 1969 – January 1, 1971		1967–1973; All of New Hanover County.
Howard Penton Jr. (Wilmington)	Democratic	January 1, 1969 – January 1, 1973		George Rountree III (Wilmington)	Republican	January 1, 1971 – January 1, 1973	Redistricted to the 12th district and retired to run for State Senate.	1967–1973; All of New Hanover County.
J. Guy Revelle Sr. (Conway)	Democratic	January 1, 1973 – January 1, 1981		Roberts Jernigan Jr. (Ahoskie)	Democratic	January 1, 1973 – January 1, 1981	Redistricted from the 6th district.	1973–1983; All of Northampton, Bertie, Hertford, and Gates counties.
C. Melvin Creecy (Rich Square)	Democratic	January 1, 1981 – January 1, 1983	Redistricted to the single-member district.	John Gillam III (Windsor)	Democratic	January 1, 1981 – January 1, 1983	Redistricted to the 6th district.	1973–1983; All of Northampton, Bertie, Hertford, and Gates counties.

=== Single-member district ===
Representative	Party	Dates	Notes	Counties
C. Melvin Creecy (Rich Square)	Democratic	January 1, 1983 – January 1, 1987	Redistricted from the multi-member district.	1983–1993; All of Northampton County. Parts of Bertie, Hertford, and Gates counties.
Brewster Brown (Winton)	Democratic	January 1, 1987 – January 1, 1989		1983–1993; All of Northampton County. Parts of Bertie, Hertford, and Gates counties.
Howard Hunter Jr. (Ahoskie)	Democratic	January 1, 1989 – January 7, 2007	Died.	1983–1993; All of Northampton County. Parts of Bertie, Hertford, and Gates counties.
Howard Hunter Jr. (Ahoskie)	Democratic	January 1, 1989 – January 7, 2007	Died.	1993-2003; All of Northampton and Gates counties. Parts of Bertie and Hertford counties.
Howard Hunter Jr. (Ahoskie)	Democratic	January 1, 1989 – January 7, 2007	Died.	2003–2005; All of Bertie, Northampton, and Hertford counties.
Howard Hunter Jr. (Ahoskie)	Democratic	January 1, 1989 – January 7, 2007	Died.	2005–2013; All of Bertie, Hertford, Gates, and Perquimans counties.
Vacant		January 7, 2007 – January 24, 2007		2005–2013; All of Bertie, Hertford, Gates, and Perquimans counties.
Annie Mobley (Ahoskie)	Democratic	January 24, 2007 – January 1, 2015	Appointed to finish Hunter's term. Lost re-nomination.	2005–2013; All of Bertie, Hertford, Gates, and Perquimans counties.
Annie Mobley (Ahoskie)	Democratic	January 24, 2007 – January 1, 2015	Appointed to finish Hunter's term. Lost re-nomination.	2013–2019; All of Bertie, Hertford, and Gates counties. Part of Pasquotank County.
Howard Hunter III (Ahoskie)	Democratic	January 1, 2015 – January 1, 2023	Lost re-election.	2013–2019; All of Bertie, Hertford, and Gates counties. Part of Pasquotank County.
Howard Hunter III (Ahoskie)	Democratic	January 1, 2015 – January 1, 2023	Lost re-election.	2019–2023; All of Hertford, Gates, and Pasquotank counties.
Bill Ward (Elizabeth City)	Republican	January 1, 2023 – Present		2023–Present; All of Hertford, Gates, Pasquotank, and Camden counties.

== Election results ==
=== 2024 ===
North Carolina House of Representatives 5th district general election, 2024
Party	Candidate	Votes	%
Republican	Bill Ward (incumbent)	22,357	54.16%
Democratic	Howard Hunter III	18,924	45.84%
Total votes		41,281	100%
Republican hold			

=== 2022 ===
North Carolina House of Representatives 5th district Republican primary election, 2022
Party	Candidate	Votes	%
Republican	Bill Ward	3,359	68.27%
Republican	Donald Kirkland	1,561	31.73%
Total votes		4,920	100%

North Carolina House of Representatives 5th district general election, 2022
Party	Candidate	Votes	%
Republican	Bill Ward	15,784	53.83%
Democratic	Howard Hunter III (incumbent)	13,539	46.17%
Total votes		29,323	100%
Republican gain from Democratic			

=== 2020 ===
North Carolina House of Representatives 5th district Democratic primary election, 2020
Party	Candidate	Votes	%
Democratic	Howard Hunter III (incumbent)	6,359	67.48%
Democratic	Keith Rivers	3,064	32.52%
Total votes		9,423	100%

North Carolina House of Representatives 5th district general election, 2020
Party	Candidate	Votes	%
Democratic	Howard Hunter III (incumbent)	20,061	56.71%
Republican	Donald Kirkland	15,314	43.29%
Total votes		35,375	100%
Democratic hold			

=== 2018 ===
North Carolina House of Representatives 5th district general election, 2018
Party	Candidate	Votes	%
Democratic	Howard Hunter III (incumbent)	15,206	59.92%
Republican	Phillip Smith	10,172	40.08%
Total votes		25,378	100%
Democratic hold			

=== 2016 ===
North Carolina House of Representatives 5th district general election, 2016
Party	Candidate	Votes	%
Democratic	Howard Hunter III (incumbent)	25,961	100%
Total votes		25,961	100%
Democratic hold			

=== 2014 ===
North Carolina House of Representatives 5th district Democratic primary election, 2014
Party	Candidate	Votes	%
Democratic	Howard Hunter III	5,248	58.89%
Democratic	Annie Mobley (incumbent)	3,664	41.11%
Total votes		8,912	100%

North Carolina House of Representatives 5th district general election, 2014
Party	Candidate	Votes	%
Democratic	Howard Hunter III	14,430	68.55%
Republican	Sidney Pierce III	6,620	31.45%
Total votes		21,050	100%
Democratic hold			

=== 2012 ===
North Carolina House of Representatives 5th district Democratic primary election, 2012
Party	Candidate	Votes	%
Democratic	Annie Mobley (incumbent)	7,351	60.77%
Democratic	Linda L. Backburn	4,746	39.23%
Total votes		12,097	100%

North Carolina House of Representatives 5th district general election, 2012
Party	Candidate	Votes	%
Democratic	Annie Mobley (incumbent)	27,458	100%
Total votes		27,458	100%
Democratic hold			

=== 2010 ===
North Carolina House of Representatives 5th district general election, 2010
Party	Candidate	Votes	%
Democratic	Annie Mobley (incumbent)	11,850	58.99%
Republican	Matthew "Matt" Peeler	8,237	41.01%
Total votes		20,087	100%
Democratic hold			

=== 2008 ===
North Carolina House of Representatives 5th district Democratic primary election, 2008
Party	Candidate	Votes	%
Democratic	Annie Mobley (incumbent)	8,480	58.63%
Democratic	Robert Richardson	5,984	41.37%
Total votes		14,464	100%

North Carolina House of Representatives 5th district general election, 2008
Party	Candidate	Votes	%
Democratic	Annie Mobley (incumbent)	23,381	100%
Total votes		23,381	100%
Democratic hold			

=== 2006 ===
North Carolina House of Representatives 5th district general election, 2006
Party	Candidate	Votes	%
Democratic	Howard Hunter Jr. (incumbent)	8,125	64.27%
Republican	Kyle Jones	4,516	35.73%
Total votes		12,641	100%
Democratic hold			

=== 2004 ===
North Carolina House of Representatives 5th district Democratic primary election, 2004
Party	Candidate	Votes	%
Democratic	Howard Hunter Jr. (incumbent)	5,724	66.70%
Democratic	Fred Yates	2,858	33.30%
Total votes		8,582	100%

North Carolina House of Representatives 5th district general election, 2004
Party	Candidate	Votes	%
Democratic	Howard Hunter Jr. (incumbent)	18,006	83.43%
Libertarian	Larry Cooke, Jr.	3,576	16.57%
Total votes		21,582	100%
Democratic hold			

=== 2002 ===
North Carolina House of Representatives 5th district general election, 2002
Party	Candidate	Votes	%
Democratic	Howard J. Hunter Jr. (incumbent)	12,714	84.31%
Libertarian	Larry Cooke	2,366	15.69%
Total votes		15,080	100%
Democratic hold			

=== 2000 ===
North Carolina House of Representatives 5th district general election, 2000
Party	Candidate	Votes	%
Democratic	Howard Hunter Jr. (incumbent)	16,341	100%
Total votes		16,341	100%
Democratic hold			
