= Stan White =

Stan White may refer to:

- Stan White (linebacker) (born 1949), American football player
- Stan White (quarterback) (born 1971), American football player
- Stan White (politician), North Carolina state senator
