= Paul O'Neal (politician) =

American politician from North Carolina

Representative Paul O'Neal
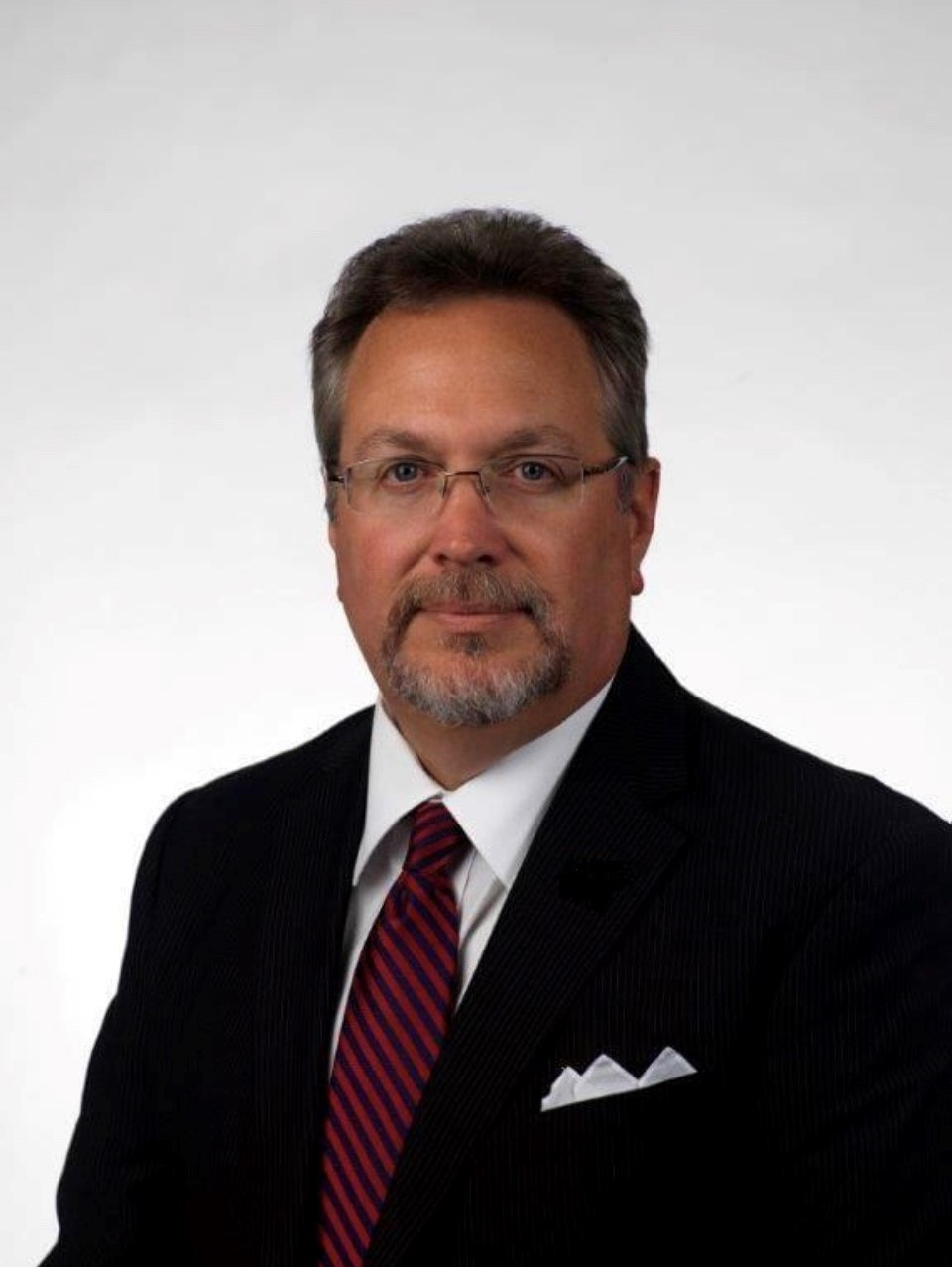
- Official government portrait.

Member of the North Carolina House of Representatives from the 6th district
- In office September 19, 2022 – January 1, 2023
- Preceded by: Bobby Hanig
- Succeeded by: Ed Goodwin (Redistricting)

Member of the Currituck County Board of Commissioners from the at-large district
- In office December 1, 2008 – December 5, 2016
- Succeeded by: Kitty Etheridge
- In office December 1994 – December 4, 2006

Personal details
- Born: Stuart Paul O'Neal; November 6, 1962 (age 63) Norfolk, Virginia, United States
- Party: Republican
- Occupation: Vice President of Towne Insurance

Stuart Paul O'Neal is an American politician who is a former member of the North Carolina House of Representatives, who represented the 6th District from 2022 to 2023. He previously served as a member of the Currituck County Board of Commissioners from 1994 to 2006 and again from 2008 to 2016. He was appointed to the state house to succeed Bobby Hanig who resigned to accept an appointment to the North Carolina Senate.

== Electoral history ==
=== 2012 ===
Currituck County Board of Commissioners at-large district Republican primary election, 2012
Party	Candidate	Votes	%
Republican	Paul O'Neal (incumbent)	1,721	77.28%
Republican	John D. Rorer	506	22.72%
Total votes		2,227	100%

Currituck County Board of Commissioners at-large district general election, 2012
Party	Candidate	Votes	%
Republican	Paul O'Neal (incumbent)	7,494	68.60%
Democratic	David Palmer	3,430	31.40%
Total votes		10,924	100%
Republican hold			

=== 2008 ===
Currituck County Board of Commissioners at-large district general election, 2008
Party	Candidate	Votes	%
Republican	Paul O'Neal	6,686	62.22%
Democratic	Stanley D. Griggs	4,060	37.78%
Total votes		10,746	100%
Republican hold			

North Carolina House of Representatives
Preceded by Bobby Hanig	Member of the North Carolina House of Representatives from the 6th district 2022–2023	Succeeded by Joe Pike
