= North Carolina's 1st House district =

American legislative district

North Carolina's 1st State House of Representatives district
Representative
Ed Goodwin; R–Edenton
- Demographics: 73% White; 18% Black; 5% Hispanic; 1% Other; 4% Multiracial
- Population (2024): 86,078

North Carolina's 1st House district is one of 120 districts in the North Carolina House of Representatives. It has been represented by Republican Ed Goodwin since 2019.

== Geography ==
Since 2023, the district has included all of Washington, Chowan, Perquimans, Tyrrell, and Currituck counties, as well as part of Dare County. The district overlaps with the 1st and 2nd Senate districts.

== District officeholders ==
=== Multi-member district ===
Representative	Party	Dates	Notes	Representative	Party	Dates	Notes	Counties
District created January 1, 1967.
Philip Godwin (Gatesville)	Democratic	January 1, 1967 – January 1, 1973	Redistricted from the Gates County district.	William Culpepper Jr. (Elizabeth City)	Democratic	January 1, 1967 – January 1, 1973		1967–1973; All of Gates, Chowan, Perquimans, Pasquotank, Camden, and Currituck counties.
Vernon James (Elizabeth City)	Democratic	January 1, 1973 – January 1, 1993	Redistricted to the single-member district.	W. Stanford White (Manns Harbor)	Democratic	January 1, 1973 – January 1, 1979		1973–1983; All of Chowan, Perquimans, Pasquotank, Camden, Currituck, Dare, Tyrrell, and Washington counties.
Vernon James (Elizabeth City)	Democratic	January 1, 1973 – January 1, 1993	Redistricted to the single-member district.	Charles Evans (Nags Head)	Democratic	January 1, 1979 – January 1, 1987		1973–1983; All of Chowan, Perquimans, Pasquotank, Camden, Currituck, Dare, Tyrrell, and Washington counties.
Vernon James (Elizabeth City)	Democratic	January 1, 1973 – January 1, 1993	Redistricted to the single-member district.	Charles Evans (Nags Head)	Democratic	January 1, 1979 – January 1, 1987		1983–1993; All of Chowan, Perquimans, Pasquotank, Camden, Currituck, Dare, and Tyrrell counties. Parts of Gates and Washington counties.
Vernon James (Elizabeth City)	Democratic	January 1, 1973 – January 1, 1993	Redistricted to the single-member district.	Raymond Thompson (Edenton)	Democratic	January 1, 1987 – January 1, 1993	Redistricted to the 86th district.	1983–1993; All of Chowan, Perquimans, Pasquotank, Camden, Currituck, Dare, and Tyrrell counties. Parts of Gates and Washington counties.

=== Single-member district ===
Representative	Party	Dates	Notes	Counties
Vernon James (Elizabeth City)	Democratic	January 1, 1993 – January 1, 1995		1993–2003; All of Currituck, Camden, and Pasquotank counties. Part of Perquimans County.
Bill Owens (Elizabeth City)	Democratic	January 1, 1995 – January 1, 2013	Retired.	1993–2003; All of Currituck, Camden, and Pasquotank counties. Part of Perquimans County.
Bill Owens (Elizabeth City)	Democratic	January 1, 1995 – January 1, 2013	Retired.	2003–2005; All of Currituck, Camden, and Pasquotank counties. Part of Gates County.
Bill Owens (Elizabeth City)	Democratic	January 1, 1995 – January 1, 2013	Retired.	2005–2013; All of Currituck, Camden, Pasquotank, and Tyrrell counties.
Bob Steinburg (Edenton)	Republican	January 1, 2013 – January 1, 2019	Retired to run for State Senate.	2013–2019; All of Chowan, Perquimans, Tyrrell, Camden, and Currituck counties. Part of Pasquotank County.
Ed Goodwin (Edenton)	Republican	January 1, 2019 – Present		2019–2023; All of Bertie, Washington, Chowan, Perquimans, Tyrrell, and Camden counties.
Ed Goodwin (Edenton)	Republican	January 1, 2019 – Present		2023–Present; All of Washington, Chowan, Perquimans, Tyrrell, and Currituck counties. Part of Dare County.

== Election results ==
=== 2026 ===
North Carolina House of Representatives 1st district Republican primary election, 2026
Party	Candidate	Votes	%
Republican	Ed Goodwin (incumbent)	5,078	52.51%
Republican	John Spruill	4,593	47.49%
Total votes		9,671	100%

North Carolina House of Representatives 1st district general election, 2026
Party	Candidate	Votes	%
Republican	Ed Goodwin (incumbent)		
Democratic	Claude (Dorsey) Harris		
Total votes			100%

=== 2024 ===
North Carolina House of Representatives 1st district general election, 2024
Party	Candidate	Votes	%
Republican	Ed Goodwin (incumbent)	31,950	65.06%
Democratic	Susan Sawin	17,160	34.94%
Total votes		49,110	100%
Republican hold			

=== 2022 ===
North Carolina House of Representatives 1st district general election, 2022
Party	Candidate	Votes	%
Republican	Ed Goodwin (incumbent)	25,737	100%
Total votes		25,737	100%
Republican hold			

=== 2020 ===
North Carolina House of Representatives 1st district general election, 2020
Party	Candidate	Votes	%
Republican	Ed Goodwin (incumbent)	20,688	54.46%
Democratic	Emily Bunch Nicholson	17,299	45.54%
Total votes		37,987	100%
Republican hold			

=== 2018 ===
North Carolina House of Representatives 1st district Republican primary election, 2018
Party	Candidate	Votes	%
Republican	Ed Goodwin	1,987	55.23%
Republican	Candice Hunter	1,611	44.77%
Total votes		3,598	100%

North Carolina House of Representatives 1st district general election, 2018
Party	Candidate	Votes	%
Republican	Ed Goodwin	14,749	53.10%
Democratic	Ronald "Ron" Wesson	13,026	46.90%
Total votes		27,775	100%
Republican hold			

=== 2016 ===
North Carolina House of Representatives 1st district general election, 2016
Party	Candidate	Votes	%
Republican	Bob Steinburg (incumbent)	25,363	64.04%
Democratic	Sam Davis	14,240	35.96%
Total votes		39,603	100%
Republican hold			

=== 2014 ===
North Carolina House of Representatives 1st district general election, 2014
Party	Candidate	Votes	%
Republican	Bob Steinburg (incumbent)	15,713	60.91%
Democratic	Garry W. Meiggs	10,082	39.09%
Total votes		25,795	100%
Republican hold			

=== 2012 ===
North Carolina House of Representatives 1st district Republican primary election, 2012
Party	Candidate	Votes	%
Republican	Bob Steinburg	3,690	60.21%
Republican	Owen Etheridge	2,439	39.79%
Total votes		6,129	100%

North Carolina House of Representatives 1st district general election, 2012
Party	Candidate	Votes	%
Republican	Bob Steinburg	21,505	56.34%
Democratic	Bill Luton	16,663	43.66%
Total votes		38,168	100%
Republican gain from Democratic			

=== 2010 ===
North Carolina House of Representatives 1st district general election, 2010
Party	Candidate	Votes	%
Democratic	Bill Owens (incumbent)	11,538	52.75%
Republican	John J. Woodard Jr.	10,336	47.25%
Total votes		21,874	100%
Democratic hold			

=== 2008 ===
North Carolina House of Representatives 1st district general election, 2008
Party	Candidate	Votes	%
Democratic	Bill Owens (incumbent)	25,181	100%
Total votes		25,181	100%
Democratic hold			

=== 2006 ===
North Carolina House of Representatives 1st district general election, 2006
Party	Candidate	Votes	%
Democratic	Bill Owens (incumbent)	12,446	100%
Total votes		12,446	100%
Democratic hold			

=== 2004 ===
North Carolina House of Representatives 1st district general election, 2004
Party	Candidate	Votes	%
Democratic	Bill Owens (incumbent)	18,873	100%
Total votes		18,873	100%
Democratic hold			

=== 2002 ===
North Carolina House of Representatives 1st district general election, 2002
Party	Candidate	Votes	%
Democratic	Bill Owens (incumbent)	12,157	100%
Total votes		12,157	100%
Democratic hold			

=== 2000 ===
North Carolina House of Representatives 1st district general election, 2000
Party	Candidate	Votes	%
Democratic	Bill Owens (incumbent)	15,475	100%
Total votes		15,475	100%
Democratic hold			
