= Joe Pike =

American politician from North Carolina

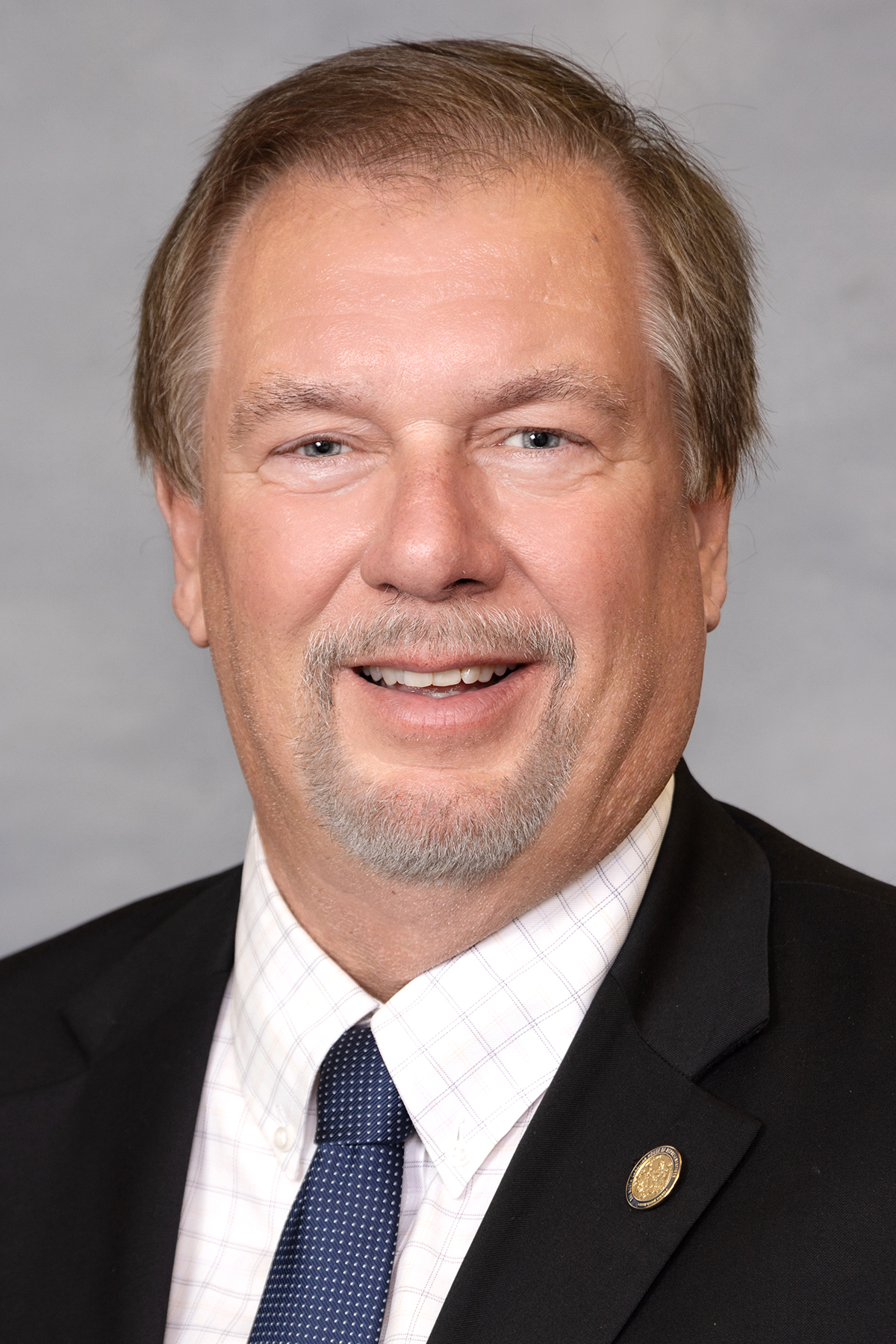

Member of the North Carolina House of Representatives from the 6th district
- Incumbent
- Assumed office January 1, 2023
- Preceded by: Paul O'Neal

Personal details
- Born: Joseph Pike
- Party: Republican
- Occupation: Business Owner

Joseph Pike is a Republican member of the North Carolina House of Representatives representing the 6th district, which includes all of Franklin County, as well as part of Granville County. He was elected in the 2022 election against Democratic opponent Kiara Johnson.

== Biography ==
Pike owns Twisted Grape Investments.

North Carolina House of Representatives
Preceded by Paul O'Neal	Member of the North Carolina House of Representatives from the 6th district 2023–present	Succeeded by Incumbent
