= Miss Katie (2022 ship) =

Hopper dredge

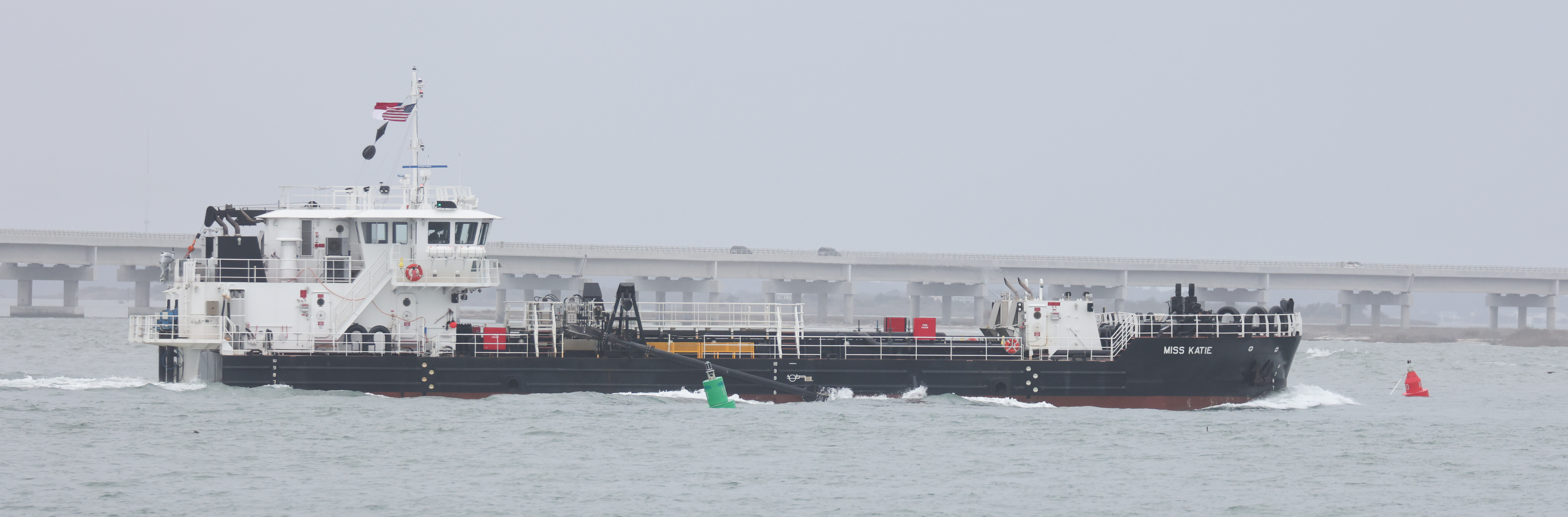
- Miss Katie

History

United States
- Name: Miss Katie
- Owner: EJE Dredging Service, LLC
- Builder: Conrad Shipyard, Morgan City, Louisiana
- Launched: April 4, 2022
- Christened: October 13, 2022
- Home port: Wanchese, North Carolina
- Identification: MMSI number: 368256670; Official Number: 1320409; Callsign: WDM9870

General characteristics
- Class & type: Hopper Dredge
- Length: 156.25 ft (47.63 m)
- Beam: 35 ft (11 m)
- Draft: 10.8 feet (3.3 m)
- Complement: 5 mariners

Miss Katie is a hopper dredge owned by EJE Dredging Service, LLC. Her primary mission is to maintain the channels through Oregon Inlet and nearby Hatteras Inlet in the Outer Banks of North Carolina. Keeping these navigable waterways open is important to local fishing, recreational boating, and other maritime interests.

== Construction and characteristics ==
Silt from several large rivers and the movement of beach sand along the Outer Banks has historically threatened navigable channels through the barrier islands. This has negatively impacted the local fishing industry and other maritime businesses. In addition, shoaling at the mouths of the inlets, or "bars", has been a factor in the loss of ships and lives.

In 1950, Congress authorized the U.S. Army Corps of Engineers to maintain a dredged channel 14 feet (4.3 m) deep through Oregon Inlet. High winds, strong tides, and major storms have largely thwarted this effort. Despite spending well over $100 million on dredging, the majority of the time the channel has fallen below its authorized depth, and sometimes it has been closed completely. For example, a storm during the week of May 8, 2022 moved enough sand to reduce the channel through Oregon Inlet to less than 3 feet (0.91 m) deep, effectively closing it to most vessels.

Local efforts to keep the inlets open resulted in a partnership between the State of North Carolina, Dare County, and EJE Dredging Service to build and operate Miss Katie. On May 20, 2019, the Dare County Board of Commissioners approved the contract for the construction of the vessel. She was designed by Jensen Naval Architects & Marine Engineers, a unit of Crowley Maritime. She was built at the Morgan City, Louisiana facility of Conrad Shipyard, LLC. The ship was launched on April 4, 2022.

Miss Katie departed the Conrad Shipyard on August 13, 2022 and arrived at her new homeport, Wanchese, North Carolina six days later. She was christened on October 13, 2022 at a ceremony at Wanchese. She was christened by Brooke Burr, wife of U.S. Senator Richard Burr.

Miss Katie is 156.25 feet (47.63 m) long and has a beam of 35 feet (11 m). Her hull is constructed of welded steel plates. Her draft is 10.8 feet (3.3 m), when her hopper is loaded with dredging spoil. She displaces 566 tons light loaded, but with a full load of spoil her displacement is over 1000 tons. Her hopper can hold up to 512 cubic yards of dredging spoil.

Miss Katie is a "suction dredge". She pulls two suctionheads, referred to as "dragheads", along the seafloor as she moves slowly through the water. The dragheads are connected to pipes called "drag arms" that descend from both sides of the ship. Sand, mud, and silt on the seafloor enters the dragheads and is pulled up through the drag arms by powerful pumps. It is then deposited in a hopper in the middle of the ship. During dredging operations, she can fill her hopper in 30 minutes. When the hopper is full, the ship sails to an offshore location and opens doors in the bottom of the hopper, allowing the dredge spoil to fall to the sea bottom. Alternatively, she can pump sand overboard for beach nourishment or other purposes.

The ship is propelled by two Cummins Diesel engines, each rated at 760 horsepower that drive two ZF ATZ 4111 azimuth thrusters. She has two Cummins QSM-11 Diesel generators which produce 250 Kw each and a Cummins QSB-7 emergency generator which produces 99 Kw. She has two bow thrusters to improve maneuverability.

The ship is crewed by 5 civilian mariners.

The ship's namesake is Caitlyn "Katie" Whitehurst, daughter of Judson Whitehurst, a partner in EJE Dredging Service, the vessel's owner.

== Funding and management ==
The construction of Miss Katie was funded by a three-way public-private partnership between the State of North Carolina, Dare County, and EJE Dredging Service. In its 2018 budget, North Carolina allocated $15 million to Dare County from its Shallow Draft Navigation Channel Dredging and Aquatic Weed Fund. The money provided a forgivable loan to a private dredge operator willing to build a dredge to keep the Inlets open. The state directed that the loan could be forgiven at the rate which dredging services were provided below the cost that would have been charged by the Army Corps of Engineers for the same work. The loan was to have a term of ten years, renewable for another five with the agreement of both parties. In the event that the loan was not fully forgiven by the end of the contract term, the dredge operator would repay any outstanding balance. The state designated the Oregon Inlet Task Force, a group created by Dare County in 2013 to manage dredging in the inlets, as the principal interface between the government and the dredge operator. The state gave the Oregon Inlet Task Force the option to allow the dredge to take on other projects if it felt that the ship could do so without jeopardizing the goal of keeping the inlets open.

The state further specified that the private dredge operator would be selected through a proposal process organized by the Oregon Inlet Task Force. Two proposals were received. One was from Cashman Dredging, a Massachusetts-based, large, experienced dredging company with operations along the Atlantic and Gulf Coasts of North America. The other was from EJE Dredging Service, a North Carolina firm with little experience dredging and no current dredging operations. It was reported that EJE was selected over its more experienced competitor because it promised to base its dredging business in the Outer Banks.

Dare County budgeted $3 million in 2023 for dredging in Oregon Inlet, which will be matched with $9 million from the State of North Carolina. A further $250,000 of dredging is planned for Hatteras Inlet, with $750,000 contributed by the State.

== Operating history ==
The U.S. Coast Guard issued Miss Katie her certificate of inspection, allowing the vessel to begin operations, on July 29, 2022.

Miss Katie's first assignment was to help reopen a channel through Oregon Inlet that had been closed by storms. She and the Army Corps of Engineers dredges USAV Snell and USAV Merritt, dredged an entirely new channel from August 2022 to January 2023.

Miss Katie dredged Hatteras Inlet for the first time between January 27 and February 5, 2023. She removed 14,172 cubic yards of sand from the channel at a cost of approximately $220,000.
