= William C. Owens Jr. =

American politician from North Carolina (born 1947)

Representative William C. Owens Jr.
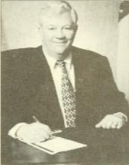
- Owens in the 2001 legislative manual

Member of the North Carolina House of Representatives from the 1st district
- In office January 1, 1995 – January 1, 2013
- Preceded by: Vernon Grant James
- Succeeded by: Bob Steinburg

Personal details
- Born: April 2, 1947 (age 79) Elizabeth City, North Carolina
- Party: Democratic
- Occupation: Businessman

William Clarence Owens Jr. (born April 2, 1947) was a Democratic member of the North Carolina General Assembly representing the state's first House district, including constituents in Camden, Currituck, Pasquotank and Tyrrell counties. A businessman from Elizabeth City, North Carolina, Owens is serving in his ninth term in the state House (2011–2012 session).

== Recent electoral history ==
North Carolina House District 1 General Election 2010
Party	Candidate	Votes	%
Democratic	W. C. (Bill) Owens Jr.	11,538	52.75
Republican	John J. Woodard Jr.	10,336	47.25
Majority		1202	5.50%
Total votes		21,874	100.00

North Carolina House of Representatives
Preceded by Vernon Grant James	Member of the North Carolina House of Representatives from the 1st district 1995-2013	Succeeded by Bob Steinburg
