= Arthur J. Williams =

American politician

Member of the North Carolina House of Representatives from the 6th district
- In office January 1, 2003 – January 1, 2011
- Preceded by: Zeno Edwards (Redistricting)
- Succeeded by: Bill Cook

Personal details
- Party: Republican (2011–present); Democratic (until 2011)

Military service
- Branch/service: United States Air Force
- Years of service: 1959–1963

Arthur James Williams III is a former Democratic member of the North Carolina General Assembly who represented the state's sixth House district, including constituents in Beaufort and Pitt counties. Williams is a retiree from Washington, North Carolina.

Willams served in the United States Air Force from 1959 to 1963. In 1960, he was an Airman Third Class stationed at Amarillo Air Force Base, Texas.

North Carolina House of Representatives
Preceded by Gene Rogers	Member of the North Carolina House of Representatives from the 6th district 2003–2011	Succeeded by Bill Cook
