= Bob Steinburg =

American politician

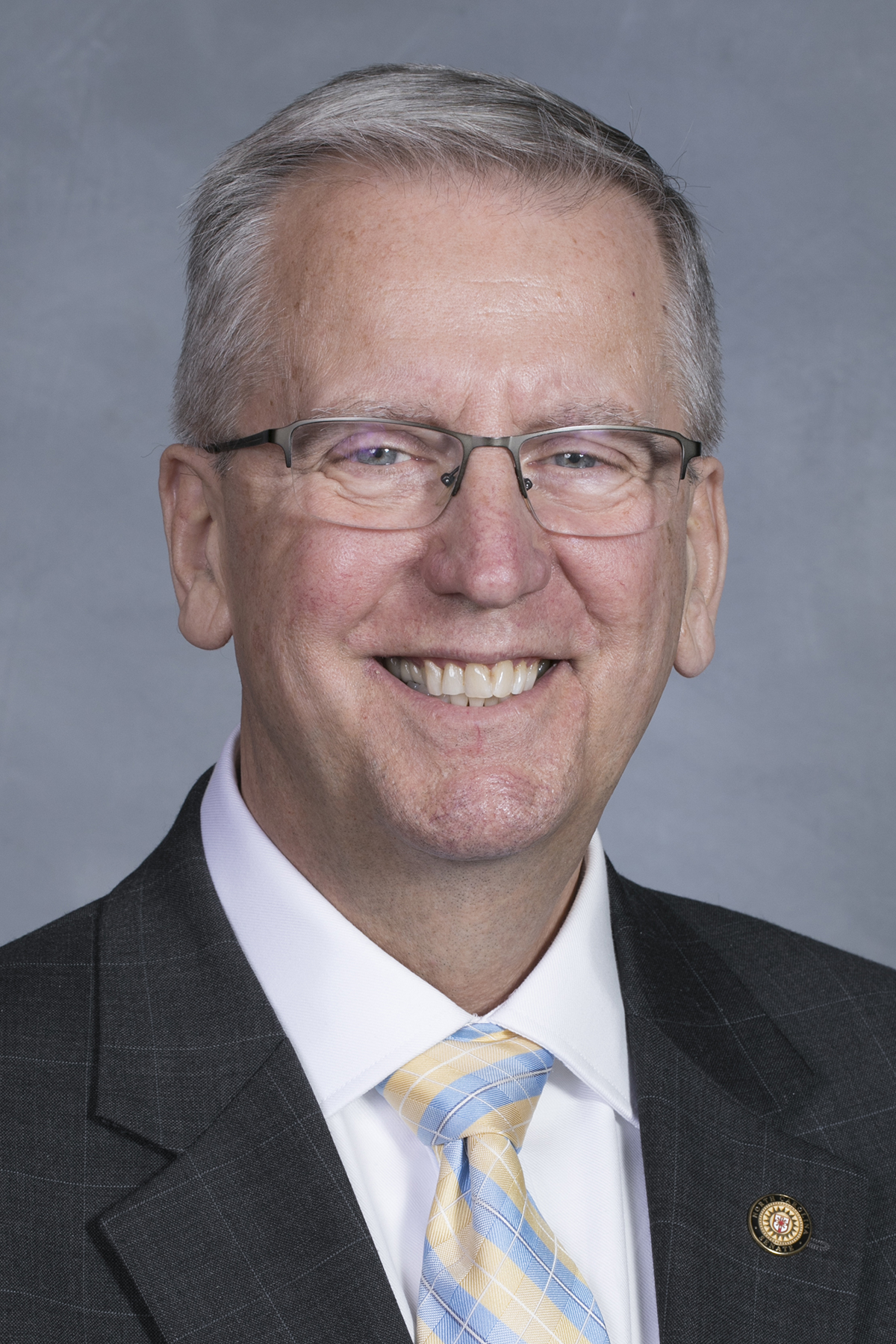

Member of the North Carolina Senate from the 1st district
- In office January 1, 2019 – July 31, 2022
- Preceded by: Bill Cook
- Succeeded by: Bobby Hanig

Member of the North Carolina House of Representatives from the 1st district
- In office January 1, 2013 – January 1, 2019
- Preceded by: Bill Owens
- Succeeded by: Ed Goodwin

Personal details
- Born: July 30, 1948 (age 78) Oswego, New York, U.S.
- Party: Republican
- Education: Corning Community College (AA); Upper Iowa University (BBA)

Bob Steinburg (born July 30, 1948) is an American politician and former Republican member of the North Carolina General Assembly. He served 3 terms in the North Carolina House of Representatives and 1.5 terms in the North Carolina Senate.

== Early life, education, marriage and career ==
Bob Steinburg was born in 1948 near Oswego, New York. He currently lives in Edenton, North Carolina. He has a bachelor's degree in business administration from Upper Iowa University in 1990. He also has an associate degree in retail business management from Corning Community College in 1969. Before entering politics, he was a columnist with a conservative point of view.

Steinburg has two sons.

Steinburg has been arrested twice, once for disorderly conduct and once for assault on his opponent's campaign manager. The charges were later dismissed. He has received heavy criticism for his temper, even being called "unfit for state Senate seat" by Senator Bill Cook. Cook, R-Beaufort, chose not to seek re-election last year after court-ordered redistricting put him outside of a redrawn Senate District 1. Cook endorsed Steinburg's primary opponent Clark Twiddy and contributed money to his campaign.

Steinburg claimed to have extremely strong relationships with both Republican and Democratic lawmakers. Steinburg responded to Cook's claim, "It's really very sad when you see someone at the end of his political career go out and trash a colleague. It is unprecedented, what he has done, and it smacks of desperation."

Steinburg missed 1 out of 5 votes during the 2014–2015 and 2017–2018 sessions in the NC House. The only members of the House of Representatives who have missed more votes were representatives who resigned while in the middle of their term or those appointed to fill the remaining term. His missed votes were due to his absence during the House session.

== Prison reform ==
After the deaths of four Pasquotank Correctional Institution staffers, Steinburg called for total reform of the prison system and suggested a secret society that protects administrators. Steinburg was very vocal with his stand toward prison systems where he voiced out the need to have adequate or appropriate staffing.

Steinburg played a role in calling for reform on the currently existing prison system. He revealed that prison employees were submitting favorable reports in regard to prison conditions. Further revelation by Steinburg on the prison system showed that employees within the prison suffered from low morale and inmates were controlling the prison. He touched on how a quick solution is needed to restore proper operation within the prison environment. This was suggested after Steinburg was made privy to a report detailing that gun cabinets were left unsecured and inmates distributing tools 24 hours before the Pasquotank Correctional Institution’s incident took place. The incident which left two prison employees dead led to Steinburg pushing harder for better prison management in place of the existing system.

== North Carolina Senate candidate ==
In November 2017, Steinburg announced his candidacy for the First District of the North Carolina Senate. Steinburg had a sweeping victory in May 2018 win by almost 20% in his primary against Clark Twiddy.

== Reaction to 2020 presidential election ==
In December 2020, Steinburg publicly called for the results of the 2020 United States presidential election to be ignored. Invoking the Insurrection Act of 1807, he called upon President Donald Trump to invoke martial law to retain power beyond the expiration of the term of office specified by the Constitution.

Steinburg has claimed that he will "never" believe that President Joe Biden legitimately won the 2020 presidential election. He has also suggested that "China, the CIA, the FBI and potentially a blackmail campaign against U.S. Supreme Court Chief Justice John Roberts are or may be involved in a long planned coup." Steinburg condemned the violence on the US Capitol.

== Committee assignments ==
Steinburg served on the following committees during the 2019–2020 session:

- Select Committee on Prison Safety (Chairman)
- Agriculture/Environment/Natural Resources
- Appropriations on General Government and Information Technology
- Appropriations on Justice and Public Safety
- Pensions and Retirement and Aging
- State and Local Government

== 2018 session ==
House Bill 966: Increase & Expand Public Safety Death Benefit

This act was to increase the death benefit for law enforcement officers who are killed in the line of duty.

== 2019 session ==
Steinburg worked on bonuses and high pay for prison employees during the session introducing bills that would allow some prison facilities to offer salary supplements up to $7,500 a year. He also questioned the trend of solitary confinement and its long-term dangers. Solitary confinement is a practice in which an inmate spends 22 to 24 hours a day alone in a cell roughly the size of a parking space.

== 2020 ==
Steinburg beat Tess Judge in the November 2020 election.

== 2021 session ==
Steinburg is a big supporter of "Opportunity scholarships" for students to attend charter schools.

== 2022 ==
In 2022 state legislative redistricting put him in the same district as Senator Norman Sanderson (R-Minnesott Beach). Steinburg faced Sanderson in the Republican primary and lost by a 10 point margin. Following his loss, Steinburg announced that he would resign his Senate seat on July 31, 2022, and would become a lobbyist.

North Carolina House of Representatives
Preceded by Bill Owens	Member of the North Carolina House of Representatives from the 1st district 2013-2019	Succeeded by Ed Goodwin
North Carolina Senate
Preceded by Bill Cook	Member of the North Carolina Senate from the 1st district 2019-2022	Succeeded by Bobby Hanig
