= Cape Hatteras Electric Cooperative =

Utility cooperative in North Carolina, US

- Type: Cooperative
- Founded: 1945
- Headquarters: Buxton, North Carolina, United States
- Key people: Richard Midgett (President); Susan Flythe (EVP and GM)
- Website: www.chec.coop

Cape Hatteras Electric Cooperative (CHEC) is a utility cooperative that distributes electricity to Hatteras and Ocracoke islands in the Outer Banks region of the state of North Carolina. The electric cooperative was founded in 1945 and is headquartered in Buxton.

== Electricity ==
Cape Hatteras Electric Cooperative distributes electricity to over 7,700 members on Hatteras Island. As an electric cooperative, CHEC is wholly owned by the members who it provides electricity to. CHEC is a Touchstone Energy Cooperative and a member of the North Carolina Electric Membership Corporation (NCEMC), an electric generation and transmission cooperative that supplies electricity to most of North Carolina's electric cooperatives. CHEC receives its electricity supply from a 115kV transmission line that connects to the Dominion North Carolina Power transmission system at the north side of Oregon Inlet and runs south along North Carolina Highway 12 to the power plant substation in Buxton. The cooperative also delivers power to Tideland EMC, which has a 34.5kV underwater power cable that serves Ocracoke Island. A 15MW diesel generation plant operated by the NCEMC is located in Buxton and is used during peak demand times and also to provide limited backup power during times of transmission maintenance or emergencies. Substations in Rodanthe and Buxton also have connection points for large portable generators should the need arise. Hatteras and Ocracoke are barrier islands that are situated between the Atlantic Ocean and the Pamlico Sound in the Outer Banks region of the state of North Carolina.

== History ==
Cape Hatteras Electric Cooperative was founded in 1945 to provide electricity to Hatteras Island, most of which lacked electricity at the time as investor-owned utilities did not find it profitable to serve the island. Prior to 1945, the only place on the island that had electricity was Hatteras Village. The cooperative constructed an oil fired power plant in Buxton to serve the island. As the power plant was the only source of power to the island, power outages were frequent and electrical costs were expensive. In 1966, a 34,500 volt transmission line was constructed south from the Nags Head Substation, across the Herbert C. Bonner Bridge via an attached cable, and continuing down Hatteras Island ending at the Buxton power plant, delivering cheaper electricity from the north via the Virginia Electric Power Company. Due to its proximity to the ocean, this line was prone to frequent weather related damage and power outages. By the early 1980s, the transmission line was also overloaded, requiring the Buxton power plant to be operated in tandem to meet demand. In 1995, the power line was completely rebuilt and upgraded to 115,000 volts at a cost of $10 million with Dominion North Carolina Power covering the cost of the project to Oregon Inlet. In recent years, larger concrete utility poles have been raised in trouble spots and new substations have been constructed to further strengthen the grid and reduce power outages. A new power cable was installed below deck on the Marc Basnight Bridge in 2018, replacing the fault prone and extremely worn cable on the old Herbert C. Bonner Bridge.

On July 27, 2017, around 4:30am, a crew working on constructing the new Marc Basnight Bridge drove a large steel casing through all three 115kV underground transmission cables between the foot of the bridge and the overhead riser pole, causing a complete power outage on Hatteras and Ocracoke islands. The Buxton power plant was quickly fired up to provide partial power to the island however, the peak island-wide demand far exceeded the 15MW generation capacity of the power plant. Engineers quickly determined the severity of the damage and that service could not be quickly restored. A state of emergency was subsequently declared the following morning and a mandatory evacuation was issued, resulting in nearly 50,000 tourists and some residents being evacuated from Hatteras and Ocracoke islands during the peak of the summer vacation season. Further south on Ocracoke Island, Tideland EMC tried to operate the island's 3MW peaking generator, but was damaged on startup and rendered inoperable. Emergency generators were brought in to supplement the power plant and electric service was restored to most areas, although blackouts and brownouts continued to be an issue during the duration of the outage. Residents who stayed were mandated to conserve their energy use to prevent overloading of the temporary generators. Repairs of the cable consisted of constructing new temporary overhead poles to bypass the damaged section, and then splicing into the existing undamaged cable at the foot of the bridge. On the afternoon of August 3, repairs were finally complete and the transmission line was quickly placed back into service. The mandatory evacuation was lifted early the following morning with tourists and visitors allowed to return. A $10.53 million settlement was reached, with PCL Civil Constructors denying guilt. The repaired section of cable continued to operate until the new cable on the bridge was finally energized in late 2018.
