= Beverly Boswell =

American politician from North Carolina

Member of the North Carolina House of Representatives from the 6th district
- In office January 1, 2017 – January 1, 2019
- Preceded by: Paul Tine
- Succeeded by: Bobby Hanig

Personal details
- Party: Republican

Beverly G. Boswell is an American Republican politician. She was the representative for the 6th district of the North Carolina House of Representatives, but lost a Republican primary challenge to Bobby Hanig in 2018. Boswell, a phlebotomist, was criticized after the North Carolina Board of Nursing asked her to stop referring to herself as a nurse on the internet.

North Carolina House of Representatives
Preceded by Paul Tine	Member of the North Carolina House of Representatives from the 6th district 2017–2019	Succeeded by Bobby Hanig
