= Paul Tine =

American politician and insurance agent from North Carolina

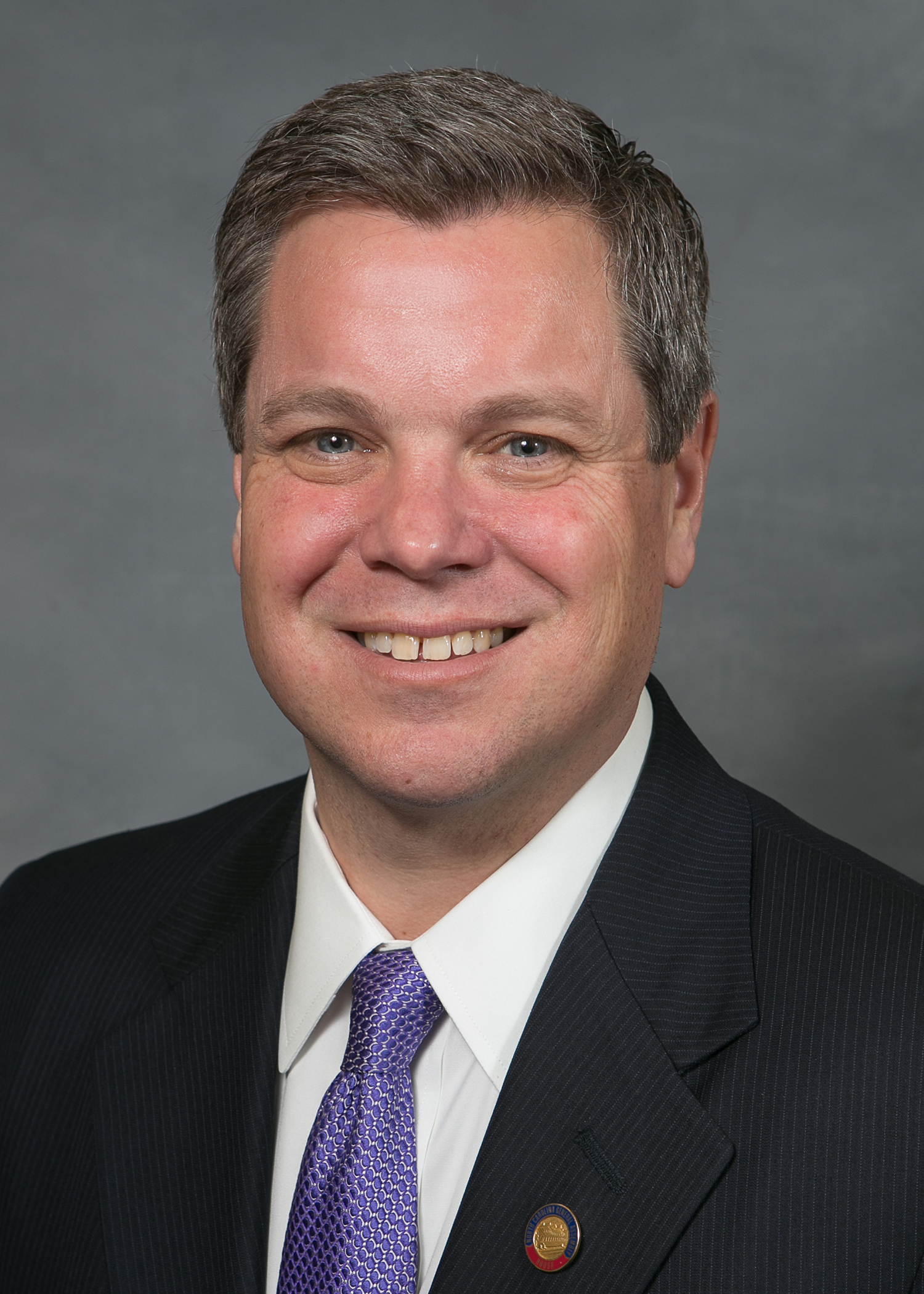

Commissioner of the North Carolina Division of Motor Vehicles
- Incumbent
- Assumed office May 6, 2025
- Governor: Josh Stein
- Preceded by: Wayne Goodwin

Member of the North Carolina House of Representatives from the 6th district
- In office January 1, 2013 – January 1, 2017
- Preceded by: Bill Cook
- Succeeded by: Beverly Boswell

Personal details
- Born: December 20, 1971 (age 54) West Virginia, U.S.
- Party: Democratic (before 2015); Independent (2015–present)
- Other political affiliations: State House Republican Caucus (2015–2017)
- Spouse: Whitney Midgett
- Education: James Madison University
- Website: Campaign website

Paul N. Tine (born December 20, 1971) is an American politician who was a member of the North Carolina House of Representatives, serving since 2013. Tine is also an insurance agent. Elected as a Democrat in 2012 and 2014, Tine left that party in January 2015, changed his registration to "Unaffiliated," and said he would caucus with the Republican House majority.

In 2025, Tine became the commissioner of the North Carolina Division of Motor Vehicles.

== Committee assignments ==
=== 2015-2016 session ===
- Appropriations (Vice Chair)
- Appropriations - Transportation (chair)
- Commerce and Job Development
- Education - Community Colleges
- Insurance (Vice Chair)
- Judiciary IV
- Rules, Calendar, and Operations of the House
- Transportation
- Wildlife Resources

=== 2013-2014 session ===
- Commerce and Job Development
- Education
- Finance
- Insurance
- Regulatory Reform
- Transportation

== Electoral history ==
=== 2014 ===
North Carolina House of Representatives 6th district general election, 2014
Party	Candidate	Votes	%
Democratic	Paul Tine (incumbent)	16,523	53.57%
Republican	Mattie Lawson	14,319	46.43%
Total votes		30,842	100%
Democratic hold			

=== 2012 ===
North Carolina House of Representatives 6th district general election, 2012
Party	Candidate	Votes	%
Democratic	Paul Tine	20,756	50.56%
Republican	Mattie Lawson	20,298	49.44%
Total votes		41,054	100%
Democratic gain from Republican			

North Carolina House of Representatives
Preceded by Bill Cook	Member of the North Carolina House of Representatives from the 6th district 2013–2017	Succeeded by Beverly Boswell
