= Annie Mobley =

American politician

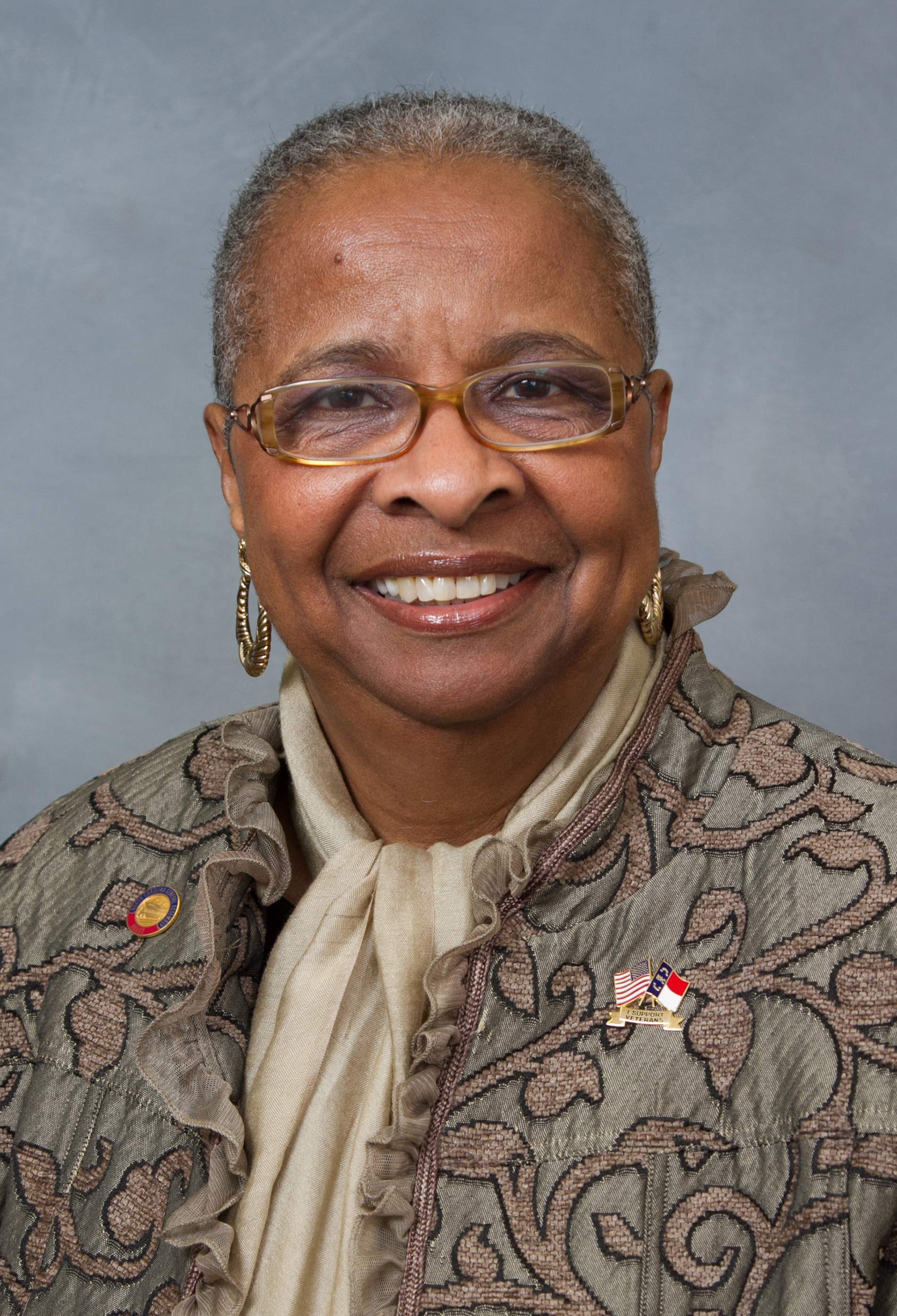

Member of the North Carolina House of Representatives from the 5th district
- In office January 24, 2007 – January 1, 2015
- Preceded by: Howard Hunter Jr.
- Succeeded by: Howard Hunter III

Personal details
- Born: January 25, 1942 (age 84)
- Party: Democratic
- Occupation: executive director, retired

Annie Ward Mobley was a Democratic member of the North Carolina House of Representatives, representing the 5th district from her appointment in January 2007 until her retirement in 2015.

North Carolina House of Representatives
Preceded by Howard Hunter Jr.	Member of the North Carolina House of Representatives from the 5th district 2007–2015	Succeeded by Howard Hunter III
