= North Carolina Division of Motor Vehicles =

Government agency in North Carolina, US

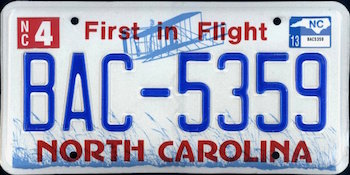
- The current North Carolina license plate

Agency overview
- Headquarters: Rocky Mount, North Carolina
- Agency executives: Paul Tine, commissioner; Joey Hopkins, secretary of transportation
- Website: www.dot.gov/dmv

The North Carolina Division of Motor Vehicles is the division of the North Carolina Department of Transportation (NCDOT) that oversees driver licenses and vehicle registrations within the state of North Carolina, USA.

The North Carolina Department of Motor Vehicles was created by the North Carolina General Assembly in 1941.

== See also ==
- Government of North Carolina
