= Gene Rogers =

American politician (1929–2023)

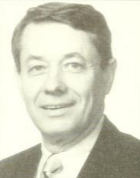
- Rogers in the 2001 legislative manual

Member of the North Carolina House of Representatives from the 6th district
- In office January 1, 1987 – January 1, 2003
- Preceded by: Ledie Mustain Brinkley
- Succeeded by: Charles Elliott Johnson (Redistricting)

Personal details
- Born: Richard Eugene Rogers; December 12, 1929 Bear Grass, North Carolina, U.S.
- Died: May 31, 2023 (aged 93) Tarboro, North Carolina, U.S.
- Party: Democratic
- Spouse: Jean Carole Griffin
- Children: 3
- Education: University of North Carolina at Chapel Hill
- Profession: Educator

Richard Eugene Rogers (December 12, 1929 – May 31, 2023) was an American politician in the state of North Carolina. A Democrat from Williamston, North Carolina, he served in the North Carolina House of Representatives for the 6th district. Outside politics, he was an academic administrator and former superintendent of Martin County Schools.

Rogers died in Tarboro, North Carolina on May 31, 2023, at the age of 93.

North Carolina House of Representatives
Preceded by Ledie Mustain Brinkley	Member of the North Carolina House of Representatives from the 6th district 1987–2003	Succeeded by Arthur Williams
