= Oregon Inlet =

Inlet in North Carolina, United States

Oregon Inlet is an inlet along North Carolina's Outer Banks. It joins the Pamlico Sound with the Atlantic Ocean and separates Bodie Island from Pea Island, which are connected by the 2.8-mile (4.5 km) Marc Basnight Bridge that spans the inlet. As one of the few access points to the ocean along this stretch of coast, Oregon Inlet is a major departure point for charter fishing trips, with a nearby harbor serving as the base for many large boats that travel miles out towards the Gulf Stream almost every day. The inlet is also the location of a U.S. Coast Guard motor lifeboat station.

== History ==
Oregon Inlet was formed when a hurricane lashed the Outer Banks in 1846, separating Bodie Island from Pea Island. One ship that rode out that storm in Pamlico Sound was named the Oregon. After the storm the crew members of this ship were the first to tell those on the mainland about the inlet's formation. Hence, it has been known as Oregon Inlet ever since.

Like many other inlets along the Outer Banks, Oregon Inlet moves southward due to drifting sands during tides and storms. It has moved south over two miles (3.2 km) since 1846, averaging around 66 feet (20 m) per year. Shoaling of the channel through Oregon Inlet caused by this movement of sand has been a problem for the fishing industry, recreational boating, and other maritime interests for decades. Since 1950, when Congress first authorized the dredging of the inlet, the channel has been shallower than planned most of the time and was sometimes closed altogether. In addition to the economic harm caused to the maritime community, several ships and lives have been lost. In 2022, Dare County contracted for a dedicated dredge, Miss Katie, to focus on keeping Oregon Inlet navigable.

=== Coast Guard station ===
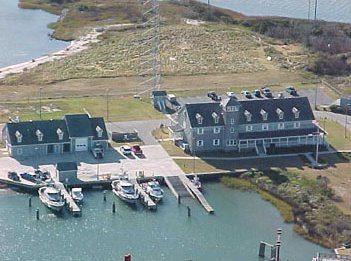
Oregon Inlet Coast Guard Station, built for $3.5 million in 1990, as it looked in 2009.

The Coast Guard station at Oregon Inlet is currently located at its fourth site since it began as a lifesaving station in 1883. It was one of 29 lifesaving stations Congress approved and appropriated funds for a decade earlier. By 1888, the Oregon Inlet Station had to be relocated to a new site. It is assumed that this relocation was necessary because of the shifting of the channel to the south and the encroachment of the ocean from the east. The station was decommissioned and moved to a new safer location some 400 feet (120 m) westward toward the sound.

Less than a decade later a storm totally destroyed the Oregon Inlet Station. By 1897, a new station was under construction and was completed in 1898 for less than $7,000. As part of a modernization program in 1933–34, the Oregon Inlet Station was extensively modified to look very much like it does today. In 1979, a new extension was added. By 1988, the station was completely abandoned when the southward migration of the Oregon Inlet threatened to swallow it.

In July 1990, a ceremonial ground breaking was held for a new $3.5 million building, located just behind the Oregon Inlet Fishing Center, on the north side of the inlet. The new station was designed with the traditional architectural design of older stations located on the Outer Banks in mind.

== Herbert C. Bonner Bridge ==
Herbert C. Bonner Bridge
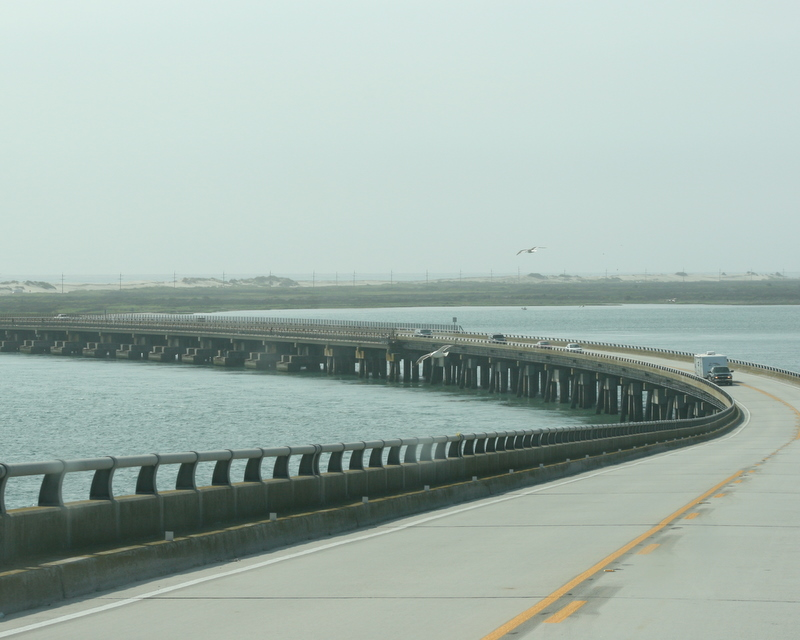
- Oregon Inlet/Bonner Bridge
- Coordinates: 35°46′00.3″N 75°31′39.8″W
- Locale: Dare County
- Other name(s): Oregon Inlet Bridge; Bonner Bridge
- Named for: Herbert C. Bonner
- Owner: NCDOT
- Maintained by: NCDOT

Characteristics
- Design: Steel stringer
- Total length: Before demolition 12,865.8 feet (3,921.5 m) After demolition 1,000 feet (300 m)
- Width: 33.5 feet (10.2 m)
- Clearance below: 6.6 feet (2.0 m)

History
- Opened: 1963
- Closed: 2019

Location
- Interactive map of Herbert C. Bonner Bridge

The Herbert C. Bonner Bridge was a two-lane automobile bridge spanning the Oregon Inlet, between Bodie Island from Pea Island, in Dare County, North Carolina. The bridge carried NC 12 and was utilized by local and seasonal tourist traffic. The 2.7-mile (4.3 km) bridge was built in 1963 and was dedicated to Herbert C. Bonner.

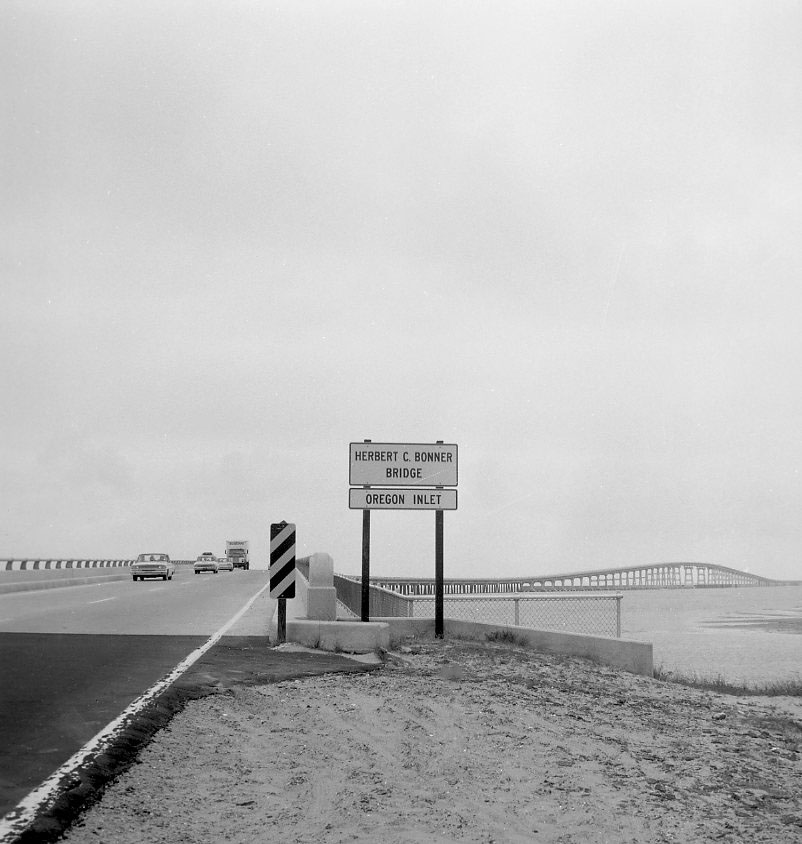
The bridge shortly after completion in 1963

Prior to the building of the Bonner bridge, Hatteras Island was only accessible by air or ferry. Ferries could carry a maximum of 2,000 people per day. The ferries cost the state $500,000 per year to operate, and there were very long lines waiting for the ferries during peak season. Due to the constantly shifting sandbars in the inlet, groundings were a constant problem. The Bonner Bridge cost $4 million to build and moved up to 14,000 cars a day in both directions. Of that amount, the state of North Carolina paid $1.5 million, and the federal government paid $2.5 million. The arrangement for a portion of the state's cost to be paid by the National Park Service was arranged by Rep. Herbert C. Bonner, for whom the bridge is named. The bridge also made it possible to provide electric power to the islands using transmission lines rather than generators.

The environmental impact on the Bonner bridge and road was not fully understood at the time of construction, and now constant beach erosion, severe weather and high volume of traffic continually forces the state to protect the integrity of the road system. As much as $50 million was spent between 1987 and 1999 to repair and protect the Bonner Bridge and NC 12 from the ocean. The bridge was due for replacement by the early 1990s but construction on the new bridge had been continually held back by environmental lawsuits brought by the Southern Environmental Law Center.

The Bonner Bridge was expected to have a thirty-year lifespan. The bridge handled about 2 million cars per year, and the state DOT ranked it a 4 on a scale of 1 to 100, with 100 being the safest.

In October 1990, a dredge collided with the bridge during a storm, causing severe damage to several of the spans. While isolated, Hatteras Island could only be accessed by boat or plane for many weeks while emergency construction was underway to replace its only highway link to the mainland.

The Federal Highway Administration approved the plan to replace the bridge over Oregon Inlet that connects with Pea Island and lies within the Cape Hatteras National Seashore. It would be longer and curve farther inland and was expected to cost approximately $1.3 billion and be completed by 2014, although it was likely to be later. On July 26, 2011, NCDOT awarded a $215.8 million contract to replace the bridge. In September 2013 the last of the legal obstacles were handled after a judge ruled in favor of the new bridge to be constructed. Construction was set to begin in early 2013 but was halted once again after an appeal was filed by the SELC. The new bridge was then to open to traffic in spring 2015 and the majority of the existing bridge was to be demolished (a portion will remain as a fishing pier).

On December 3, 2013, NCDOT closed the bridge due to immediate safety concerns. Routine sonar scanning of the bridge identified scouring concerns, or areas where too much sand has eroded from the support structure of the bridge. "Closing the Bonner Bridge is necessary to keep all travelers safe, but we know it will have a devastating effect on the people who live along and visit the Outer Banks," said NCDOT Secretary Tony Tata. "We will work to safely reopen this vital lifeline quickly, and hope to be able to begin construction on a new bridge as soon as possible." Until it was safe to reopen, The NCDOT Ferry Division provided emergency support to move cars and trucks across the Pamlico Sound between Rodanthe and Stumpy Point. After sand was dredged to support some of its pilings, the bridge reopened to traffic on December 15, 2013.

On December 16, 2015, crews from Cape Hatteras Electric Cooperative began moving underground electric cables, which were subsequently attached to the old Bonner Bridge, that connected Hatteras Island to the cooperative's power supplier Dominion North Carolina Power. This was done in order for construction of the new bridge to begin and signaled the beginning of the bridge construction process.

== Marc Basnight Bridge ==
Marc Basnight Bridge
- Coordinates: 35°46′21″N 75°32′14″W
- Carries: NC 12
- Crosses: Oregon Inlet
- Locale: Dare County
- Named for: Marc Basnight
- Owner: NCDOT
- Maintained by: NCDOT

Characteristics
- Total length: 2.8 miles (4.5 km)

History
- Designer: HDR, Inc.
- Engineering design by: HDR, Inc.
- Construction start: March 8, 2016
- Construction end: 2019
- Opened: February 25, 2019

Location
- Interactive map of Marc Basnight Bridge

The official groundbreaking for construction of the new bridge was held on March 8, 2016. The project cost $252 million and the new bridge was expected to open in February 2019.

A crew working on the bridge on July 27, 2017, severed a transmission line owned by Cape Hatteras Electric Cooperative and caused a widespread blackout on both Hatteras and Ocracoke islands. 50,000 tourists had to be evacuated until power was restored August 3, 2017.

The 2.8-mile-long (4.5 km) bridge opened February 25, 2019. On March 7, 2019, state board of transportation voted to name the new bridge for Marc Basnight despite the fact that during its three-year construction it had already become widely known as the New Bonner Bridge and had been repeatedly referred to as such in news articles. The decision to name the new bridge for Basnight was controversial and was opposed by many residents of Hatteras Island who wanted it to be named for Bonner. A dedication ceremony for the new bridge was held on April 2, 2019 with NC Governor Roy Cooper as the keynote speaker.

The bridge received the Deep Foundation Institute’s Outstanding Project Award in 2019 due to the bridge's innovative foundation, designed to withstand extreme bridge scour.
