= Bill Ward (North Carolina politician) =

American politician

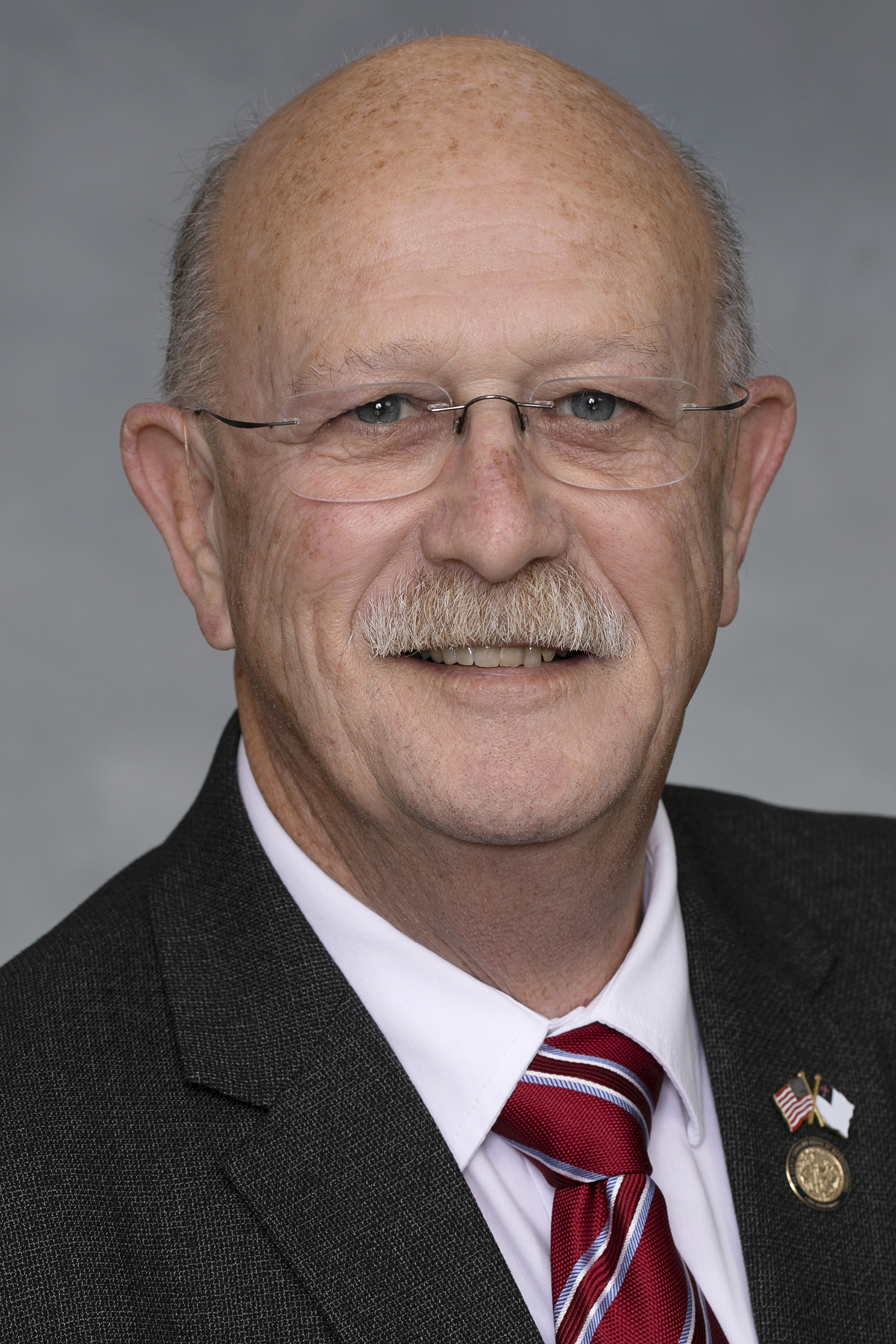

Member of the North Carolina House of Representatives from the 5th district
- Incumbent
- Assumed office January 1, 2023
- Preceded by: Howard Hunter III

Personal details
- Born: 1950 or 1951 (age 75–76)
- Party: Republican
- Occupation: Retired law enforcement
- Website: Official website

Bill Ward (born 1950 or 1951) is an American politician who serves as a Republican member of the North Carolina House of Representatives, representing the 5th district (including all of Hertford, Gates, Pasquotank, and Camden counties) since 2023.

== Committee assignments ==
=== 2023-2024 session ===
- Appropriations
- Appropriations - General Government
- Election Law and Campaign Finance Reform
- Judiciary 3 (Vice Chair)
- State Government
- State Personnel

== Electoral history ==
=== 2022 ===
North Carolina House of Representatives 5th district Republican primary election, 2022
Party	Candidate	Votes	%
Republican	Bill Ward	3,359	68.27%
Republican	Donald Kirkland	1,561	31.73%
Total votes		4,920	100%

North Carolina House of Representatives 5th district general election, 2022
Party	Candidate	Votes	%
Republican	Bill Ward	15,784	53.83%
Democratic	Howard Hunter III (incumbent)	13,539	46.17%
Total votes		29,323	100%
Republican gain from Democratic			

North Carolina House of Representatives
Preceded by Howard Hunter III	Member of the North Carolina House of Representatives from the 5th district 2023–Present	Incumbent
