= Bill Cook (politician) =

American politician (born 1945)

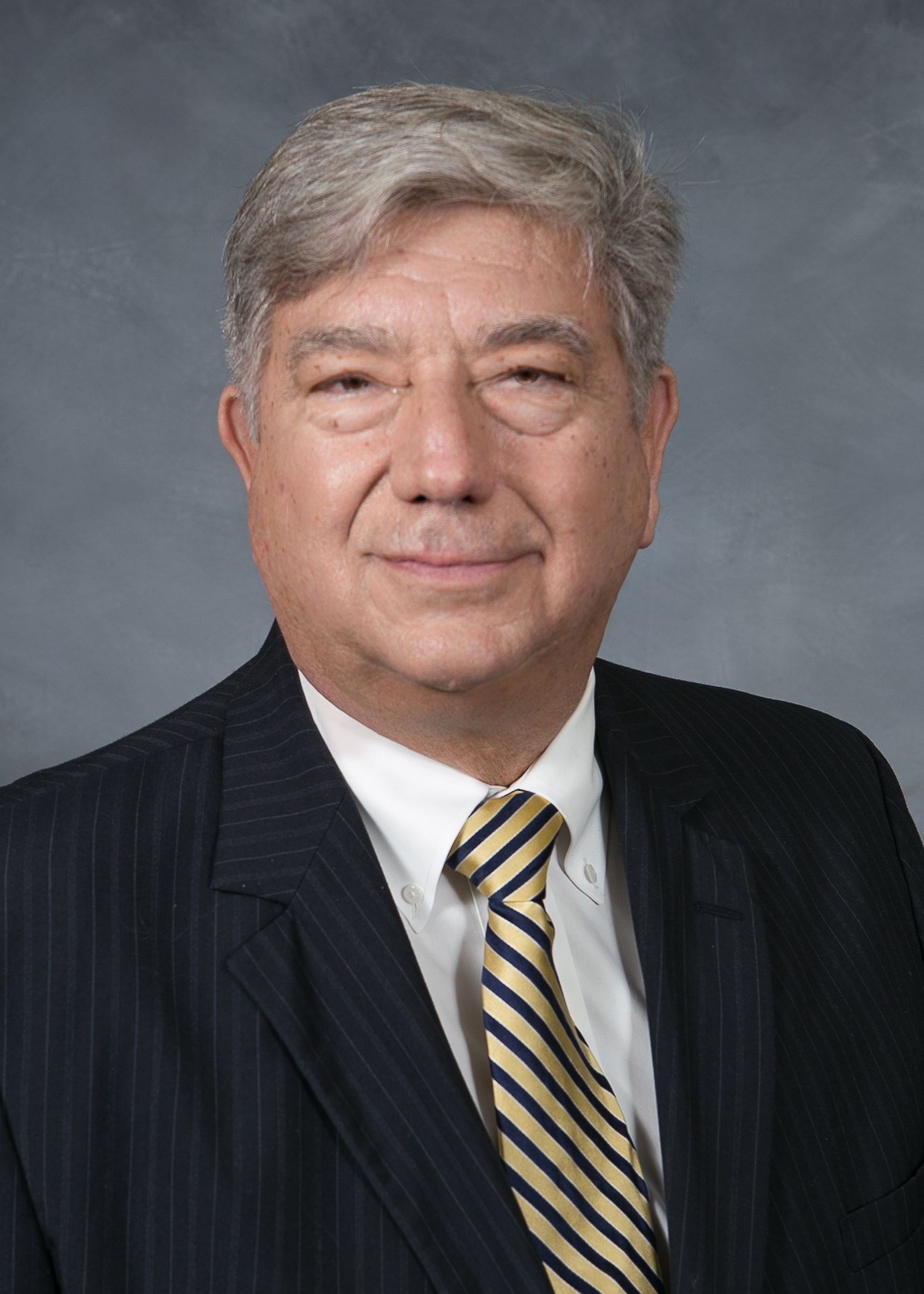

Member of the North Carolina Senate from the 1st district
- In office January 4, 2013 – January 1, 2019
- Preceded by: Stan White
- Succeeded by: Bob Steinburg

Member of the North Carolina House of Representatives from the 6th district
- In office January 15, 2011 – January 4, 2013
- Preceded by: Arthur Williams
- Succeeded by: Paul Tine

Personal details
- Born: August 12, 1945 (age 81) Washington, D.C., U.S.
- Party: Republican
- Spouse: Holly Cook
- Education: University of Maryland
- Occupation: Businessman - Retired from Potomac Electric Power Co.

William Cook (born August 12, 1945) is an American politician. A member of the Republican Party, he served as member of the North Carolina General Assembly from 2011 to 2019.

Cook graduated from the University of Maryland in 1970 with a Bachelor of Science degree in business administration, with a concentration in economics. After graduation, he was offered an analyst position with Potomac Electric Power Company, where he worked for 34 years.

Cook was elected to the North Carolina House of Representatives for District 6 in 2010, defeating incumbent Stan White by 21 votes after a recount. He was elected to serve as North Carolina State Senator for District 1 in 2013. During his tenure in the North Carolina General Assembly, he served as the co-chairman of the following committees: Senate's Appropriations on Natural and Economic Resources Committee, Senate's Agriculture, Environment and Natural Resource, and the Agriculture and Forestry Awareness Study Commission. Additionally, he was a member on the following committees: Education/Higher Education, Finance, Judiciary II, Commerce, Program Evaluation, Joint Legislative Oversight on Agriculture and Natural and Economic Resources, Joint Legislative Oversight on Education, Regulatory and Rate Issues in Insurance and Joint Legislative Workforce Development System Reform Oversight.

In 2017, Cook announced that he would not seek reelection.

In 2018, Cook was listed as a Champion of the Family by the NC Values Coalition.

Cook and his wife of 25 years, Holly, live in Beaufort County.

North Carolina Senate
Preceded by Stan White	Member of the North Carolina Senate from the 1st district 2013-2019	Succeeded by Bob Steinburg

North Carolina House of Representatives
Preceded by Arthur Williams	Member of the North Carolina House of Representatives from the 6th district 2011–2013	Succeeded by Paul Tine
