= Stan White (politician) =

American politician

Member of the North Carolina Senate from the 1st district
- In office January 26, 2011 – January 1, 2013
- Preceded by: Marc Basnight
- Succeeded by: Bill Cook

Personal details
- Party: Democratic
- Education: East Carolina University (BS)
- Occupation: teacher, businessman

Stan M. White is a North Carolina politician who served as a member of the North Carolina Senate. A Democrat, he was appointed to represent Senate District 1 following the resignation of Sen. Marc Basnight just before the opening of the 2011 session of the legislature. He went on to lose the 2012 election to retain his seat by 21 votes out of more than 87,000 cast. White announced plans to run for the seat again in 2014.

White, who owns Stan White Realty and Construction on the Outer Banks, is a former Dare County commissioner and board chairman, and a former North Carolina Board of Transportation member.

White attended Manteo High School and is a graduate of East Carolina University.

North Carolina Senate
Preceded by Marc Basnight	Member of the North Carolina Senate from the 1st district 2011–2013	Succeeded by Bill Cook
