= Marc Basnight =

American politician (1947–2020)

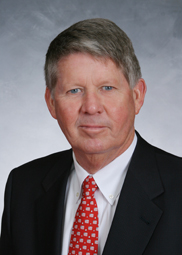

President pro tempore of the North Carolina Senate
- In office January 1, 1993 – January 1, 2011
- Preceded by: Henson P. Barnes
- Succeeded by: Phil Berger

Member of the North Carolina Senate from the 1st district
- In office January 1, 1985 – January 25, 2011
- Preceded by: Melvin Roy Daniels Jr.
- Succeeded by: Stan White

Personal details
- Born: May 13, 1947 Manteo, North Carolina, U.S.
- Died: December 28, 2020 (aged 73)
- Party: Democratic
- Spouse: Widower
- Profession: small business owner

Marc Basnight (May 13, 1947 – December 28, 2020) was an American politician who served as a Democratic member of the North Carolina State Senate, representing the 1st district, from 1984 through his resignation just before the start of what would have been his 14th term in 2011. His district included constituents in Beaufort, Camden, Currituck, Dare, Hyde, Pasquotank, Tyrrell, and Washington counties.

== Career ==
A small business owner, Basnight held the position of President pro tempore from 1993 until Democrats lost their Senate majority in the November 2010 elections. In December 2006, Senate Democrats officially backed him for a record eighth term in that post, and in January 2009, Senate Democrats and two Republicans backed him for a ninth term. Such bipartisan support is rare when electing presiding officers in the North Carolina legislature. In the wake of the 2010 elections, Basnight said he would not seek any leadership post in the minority Democratic caucus when the legislature reconvened in January 2011. Then, he announced he would resign just before the opening of the new legislature, due to health issues. In an Associated Press interview February 13, 2012, asked if he had Lou Gehrig's disease (ALS), Basnight said, "I may have it, may not." Benjamin Brooks of Carolinas Medical Center said Basnight had progressive bulbar palsy and that, while someone could die from the condition, it was also possible to live a long time. Brooks said medication was slowing the disease's progress, and that it was uncertain whether Basnight had ALS.

On March 7, 2019, the North Carolina State Board of Transportation voted to name the 2.8-mile Oregon Inlet bridge opened three days earlier for Basnight.

== Personal life and business ==
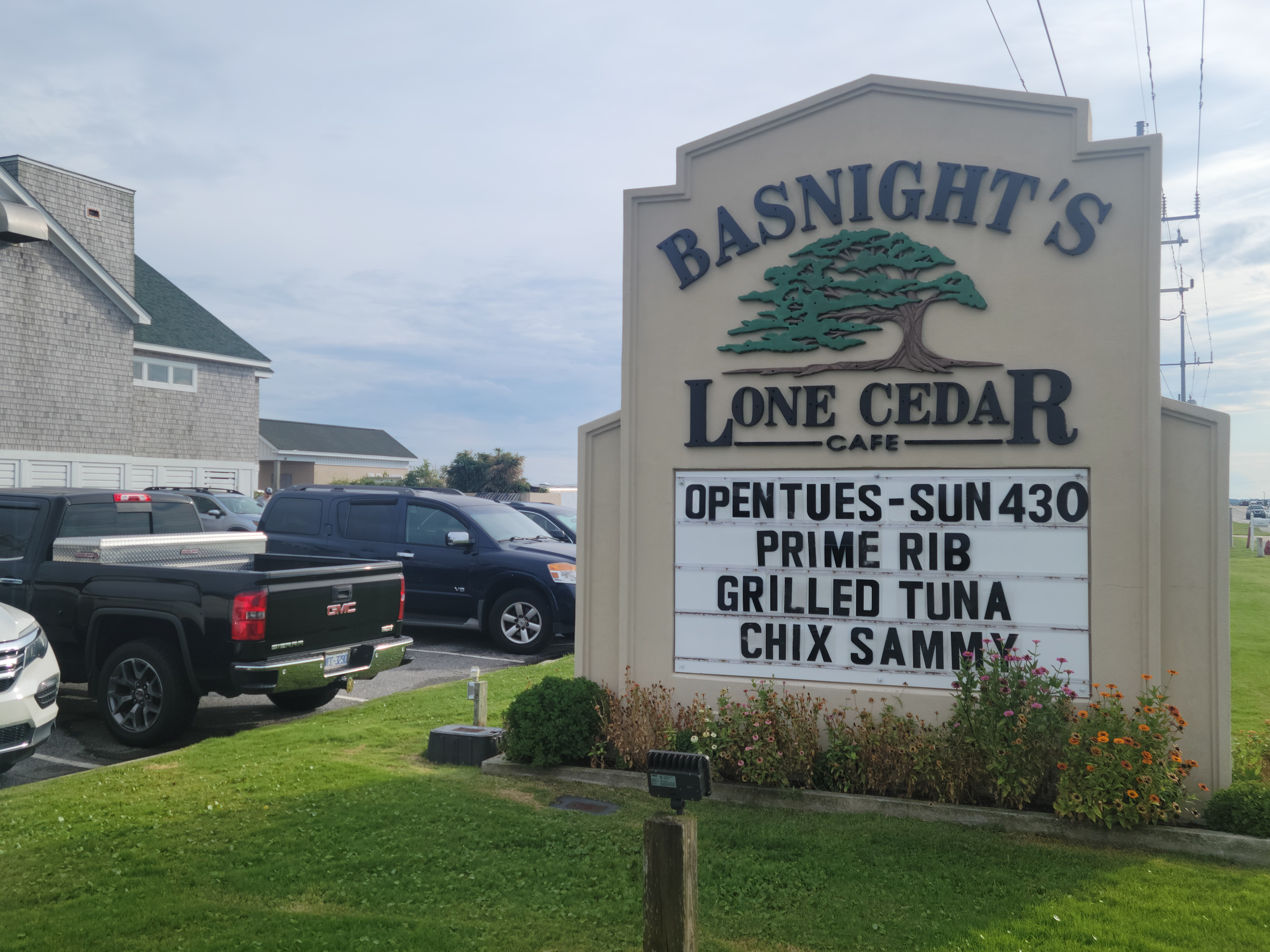
A photo of his restaurant, Basnight's Lone Cedar Cafe

Basnight was born in Manteo, North Carolina, and graduated from Manteo High School in 1966. He married the late Sandy Tillett on March 23, 1968; they parented two children together, Caroline and Vicki. Basnight chaired the Dare County tourist bureau from 1974 to 1976, and was a member of the North Carolina Board of Transportation from 1977 to 1983. Though Basnight never attended college, he received an honorary bachelor's degree from East Carolina University in 1996. Basnight was a member of the Masons.

Basnight owned a restaurant, Basnight's Lone Cedar Cafe, between Manteo and Nags Head on the Outer Banks. It burned to the ground May 1, 2007, in what was determined to be a fire caused by arson. It has since been rebuilt.

Basnight died on December 28, 2020. He was 73 years old.

North Carolina Senate
Preceded by Melvin Roy Daniels Jr.	Member of the North Carolina Senate from the 1st district 1985–2011	Succeeded by Stan White
Preceded by Henson P. Barnes	President pro tempore of the North Carolina Senate; 1993–2011	Succeeded by Phil Berger
