= Howard J. Hunter Jr. =

American politician (1946–2007)

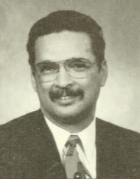
- Hunter's official portrait in the 2001 legislative manual

Member of the North Carolina House of Representatives from the 5th district
- In office January 1, 1989 – January 7, 2007
- Preceded by: Brewster Warren Brown
- Succeeded by: Annie Mobley

Personal details
- Born: December 16, 1946
- Died: January 7, 2007 (aged 60)
- Party: Democratic

Howard J. Hunter Jr. (December 19, 1946 – January 7, 2007) was a Democratic member of the North Carolina General Assembly representing the state's fifth House district, including constituents in Bertie, Gates, Hertford and Perquimans (and formerly Northampton) counties. A funeral director from Ahoskie, North Carolina, Hunter served nine full terms in the state House of Representatives. After being elected to a tenth term in November 2006, Hunter died on January 7, 2007, before the new legislature convened. He was born in Washington, D.C.

His son, Howard J. Hunter III, sought to replace his father in the seat, but local Democratic Party leaders instead nominated retired court clerk Annie Mobley. The younger Hunter was eventually elected to the House, in 2014.

North Carolina House of Representatives
Preceded by Brewster Warren Brown	Member of the North Carolina House of Representatives from the 5th district 1989–2007	Succeeded by Annie Mobley
