= Howard J. Hunter III =

American politician

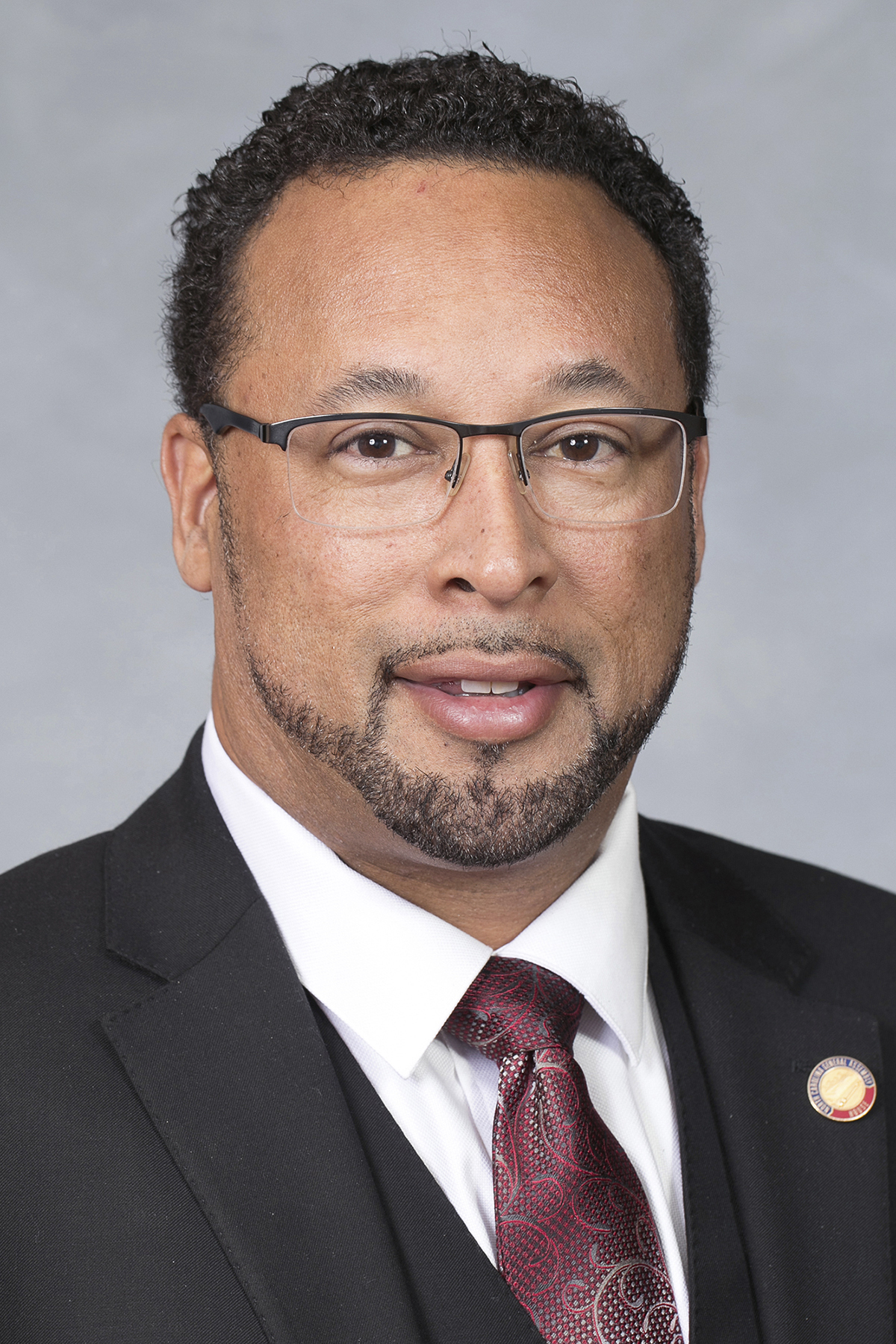

Member of the North Carolina House of Representatives from the 5th district
- In office January 1, 2015 – January 1, 2023
- Preceded by: Annie Mobley
- Succeeded by: Bill Ward

Personal details
- Born: Howard Jacque Hunter III Murfreesboro, North Carolina
- Party: Democratic
- Spouse: Lori Hunter (M) 2020
- Children: 5
- Education: Fayetteville Technical Community College; Chowan University
- Website: Official website

Howard Jacque Hunter III is a former member of the North Carolina House of Representatives who represented the state's 5th House district (including constituents in Gates, Hertford, and Pasquotank counties) from 2015 to 2023. A Democrat, Hunter was first elected to the legislature in 2014. He was re-elected in 2016, 2018, and 2020, but he lost re-election in 2022.

Hunter is the son of the late Rep. Howard J. Hunter Jr. and is the nephew of former U.S. Secretary of Agriculture Mike Espy.

== Electoral history ==
=== 2022 ===
North Carolina House of Representatives 5th district general election, 2022
Party	Candidate	Votes	%
Republican	Bill Ward	15,784	53.83%
Democratic	Howard Hunter III (incumbent)	13,539	46.17%
Total votes		29,323	100%
Republican gain from Democratic			

=== 2020 ===
North Carolina House of Representatives 5th district Democratic primary election, 2020
Party	Candidate	Votes	%
Democratic	Howard Hunter III (incumbent)	6,359	67.48%
Democratic	Keith Rivers	3,064	32.52%
Total votes		9,423	100%

North Carolina House of Representatives 5th district general election, 2020
Party	Candidate	Votes	%
Democratic	Howard Hunter III (incumbent)	20,061	56.71%
Republican	Donald Kirkland	15,314	43.29%
Total votes		35,375	100%
Democratic hold			

=== 2018 ===
North Carolina House of Representatives 5th district general election, 2018
Party	Candidate	Votes	%
Democratic	Howard Hunter III (incumbent)	15,206	59.92%
Republican	Phillip Smith	10,172	40.08%
Total votes		25,378	100%
Democratic hold			

=== 2016 ===
North Carolina House of Representatives 5th district general election, 2016
Party	Candidate	Votes	%
Democratic	Howard Hunter III (incumbent)	25,961	100%
Total votes		25,961	100%
Democratic hold			

=== 2014 ===
North Carolina House of Representatives 5th district Democratic primary election, 2014
Party	Candidate	Votes	%
Democratic	Howard Hunter III	5,248	58.89%
Democratic	Annie Mobley (incumbent)	3,664	41.11%
Total votes		8,912	100%

North Carolina House of Representatives 5th district general election, 2014
Party	Candidate	Votes	%
Democratic	Howard Hunter III	14,430	68.55%
Republican	Sidney Pierce III	6,620	31.45%
Total votes		21,050	100%
Democratic hold			

== Committee assignments ==
=== 2021-2022 session ===
- Agriculture
- Transportation
- Health
- Ethics
- Rules, Calendar, and Operations of the House Committee
- Finance
- Families, Children, and Aging Policy Committee (Chair)

=== 2019-2020 session ===
- Appropriations
- Appropriations - Information Technology Committee
- Agriculture (Vice Chair)
- Transportation
- Health
- Ethics
- Rules, Calendar, and Operations of the House

=== 2017-2018 session ===
- Appropriations
- Appropriations - Agriculture and Natural and Economic Resources
- Agriculture
- Elections and Ethics Law
- Transportation
- Education - K-12
- Health
- University Board of Governors Nominations

=== 2015-2016 session ===
- Appropriations
- Appropriations - Health and Human Services
- Agriculture
- Commerce and Job Development
- Elections
- Judiciary IV
- Transportation

North Carolina House of Representatives
Preceded by Annie Mobley	Member of the North Carolina House of Representatives from the 5th district 2015–2023	Succeeded by Bill Ward
