= Ed Goodwin =

American politician from North Carolina

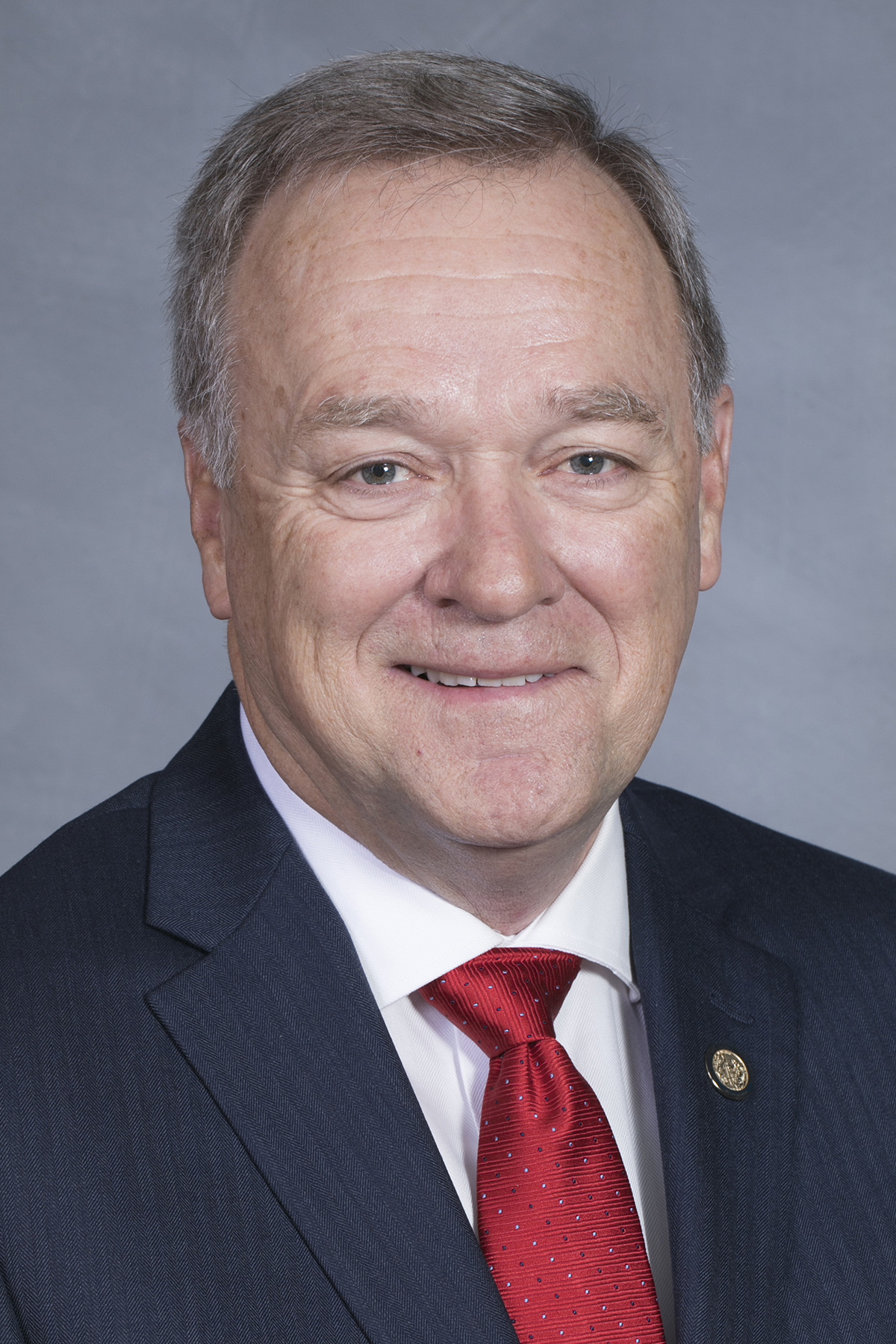

Member of the North Carolina House of Representatives from the 1st district
- Incumbent
- Assumed office January 1, 2019
- Preceded by: Bob Steinburg

Personal details
- Born: Edward Charles Goodwin; September 4, 1952 (age 74) Edenton, North Carolina, U.S.
- Party: Republican
- Spouse: Lori
- Children: 3
- Education: East Carolina University (BS)
- Website: Official website

Edward Charles Goodwin (born September 4, 1952) is an American politician from the state of North Carolina. A Republican, he is a member of the North Carolina House of Representatives, representing the 1st district (including all of Bertie, Camden, Chowan, Perquimans, Tyrrell, and Washington counties).

== Career ==
Goodwin served in the United States Air Force from 1972 to 1976. He graduated from East Carolina University with a bachelor's degree in 1981. He then served in the Naval Criminal Investigative Service from 1983 to 2004. Goodwin was elected county commissioner of Chowan County, North Carolina, in 2008. He ran against Elaine Marshall for Secretary of State of North Carolina in 2012, and lost. He served as an aide to Governor Pat McCrory, who appointed him as director of the North Carolina Department of Transportation Ferry Division in 2014. He left the position in 2017. He ran for the North Carolina House in 2018, and won.

== Electoral history ==
=== 2020 ===
North Carolina House of Representatives 1st district general election, 2020
Party	Candidate	Votes	%
Republican	Ed Goodwin (incumbent)	20,688	54.46%
Democratic	Emily Bunch Nicholson	17,299	45.54%
Total votes		37,987	100%
Republican hold			

=== 2018 ===
North Carolina House of Representatives 1st district general election, 2018
Party	Candidate	Votes	%
Republican	Ed Goodwin	14,749	53.10%
Democratic	Ronald (Ron) Wesson	13,026	46.90%
Total votes		27,775	100%
Republican hold			

=== 2012 ===
North Carolina Secretary of State Republican primary election, 2012
Party	Candidate	Votes	%
Republican	Ed Goodwin	246,641	35.94%
Republican	Kenn Gardner	204,630	29.82%
Republican	Michael (Mike) Beitler	166,061	24.20%
Republican	A. J. Daoud	68,834	10.03%
Total votes		686,166	100%

North Carolina Secretary of State Republican primary run-off election, 2012
Party	Candidate	Votes	%
Republican	Ed Goodwin	74,649	54.47%
Republican	Kenn Gardner	62,400	45.53%
Total votes		137,049	100%

North Carolina Secretary of State general election, 2012
Party	Candidate	Votes	%
Democratic	Elaine Marshall (incumbent)	2,331,173	53.79%
Republican	Ed Goodwin	2,003,026	46.21%
Total votes		4,334,199	100%
Democratic hold			

== Committee assignments ==
=== 2021–2022 session ===
- Appropriations (Vice chair)
- Appropriations – Agriculture and Natural and Economic Resources (Chair)
- Homeland Security, Military, and Veterans Affairs (Chair)
- Environment
- Transportation
- Agriculture
- State Personnel
- Marine Resources and Aqua Culture

=== 2019–2020 session ===
- Appropriations
- Appropriations – Agriculture and Natural and Economic Resources
- Appropriations – Capital
- Insurance
- Environment
- Transportation

=== 2025–2026 session ===
Agriculture and Environment — Member Appropriations — Vice Chairman Appropriations, Agriculture and Natural and Economic Resources — Chairman Homeland Security and Military and Veterans Affairs — Chairman Wildlife Resources — Member

North Carolina House of Representatives
Preceded by Bob Steinburg	Member of the North Carolina House of Representatives from the 1st district 2019–Present	Incumbent
