= North Carolina's 1st Senate district =

American legislative district

North Carolina's 1st State Senate district
Senator
Bobby Hanig; R–Powells Point
- Demographics: 73% White; 17% Black; 5% Hispanic; 1% Asian; 4% Multiracial
- Population (2023): 201,821

North Carolina's 1st Senate district is one of 50 districts in the North Carolina Senate. It has been represented by Republican Bobby Hanig since 2025.

== Geography ==
Since 2025, the district has included all of Bertie, Northampton, Hertford, Gates, Perquimans, Pasquotank, Camden, Currituck, Tyrrell, and Dare counties. The district overlaps with the 1st, 5th, 23rd, 27th, and 79th state house districts.

== District officeholders since 1949 ==
=== Multi-member district ===
Senator	Party	Dates	Notes	Senator	Party	Dates	Notes	Counties
W. I. Halstead (South Mills)	Democratic	January 1, 1949 – January 1, 1951		J. Emmett Winslow (Hertford)	Democratic	January 1, 1949 – January 1, 1953		1949–1965; All of Bertie, Hertford, Gates, Chowan, Perquimans, Pasquotank, Camden, and Currituck counties.
J. William Copeland (Murfreesboro)	Democratic	January 1, 1951 – January 1, 1955		J. Emmett Winslow (Hertford)	Democratic	January 1, 1949 – January 1, 1953		1949–1965; All of Bertie, Hertford, Gates, Chowan, Perquimans, Pasquotank, Camden, and Currituck counties.
J. William Copeland (Murfreesboro)	Democratic	January 1, 1951 – January 1, 1955		A. Pilston Godwin Jr. (Gatesville)	Democratic	January 1, 1953 – January 1, 1959		1949–1965; All of Bertie, Hertford, Gates, Chowan, Perquimans, Pasquotank, Camden, and Currituck counties.
N. Elton Aydlett (Elizabeth City)	Democratic	January 1, 1955 – January 1, 1959		A. Pilston Godwin Jr. (Gatesville)	Democratic	January 1, 1953 – January 1, 1959		1949–1965; All of Bertie, Hertford, Gates, Chowan, Perquimans, Pasquotank, Camden, and Currituck counties.
J. William Copeland (Murfreesboro)	Democratic	January 1, 1959 – January 1, 1961		J. Emmett Winslow (Hertford)	Democratic	January 1, 1959 – January 1, 1963		1949–1965; All of Bertie, Hertford, Gates, Chowan, Perquimans, Pasquotank, Camden, and Currituck counties.
N. Elton Aydlett (Elizabeth City)	Democratic	January 1, 1961 – January 1, 1965		J. Emmett Winslow (Hertford)	Democratic	January 1, 1959 – January 1, 1963		1949–1965; All of Bertie, Hertford, Gates, Chowan, Perquimans, Pasquotank, Camden, and Currituck counties.
N. Elton Aydlett (Elizabeth City)	Democratic	January 1, 1961 – January 1, 1965		J. J. Harrington (Lewiston)	Democratic	January 1, 1963 – January 1, 1965	Redistricted to the 3rd district.	1949–1965; All of Bertie, Hertford, Gates, Chowan, Perquimans, Pasquotank, Camden, and Currituck counties.
J. Emmett Winslow (Hertford)	Democratic	January 1, 1965 – January 1, 1967						1965–1967; All of Gates, Chowan, Perquimans, Pasquotank, Camden, and Currituck counties.
George Wood (Camden)	Democratic	January 1, 1967 – January 1, 1973		J. J. Harrington (Lewiston)	Democratic	January 1, 1967 – January 1, 1983	Redistricted from the 3rd district. Redistricted to the 2nd district.	1967–1973; All of Northampton, Bertie, Hertford, Gates, Chowan, Washington, Perquimans, Pasquotank, Camden, and Currituck counties.
Philip Godwin (Gatesville)	Democratic	January 1, 1973 – January 1, 1975		J. J. Harrington (Lewiston)	Democratic	January 1, 1967 – January 1, 1983	Redistricted from the 3rd district. Redistricted to the 2nd district.	1973–1983; All of Northampton, Bertie, Hertford, Gates, Chowan, Perquimans, Pasquotank, Camden, Currituck, Dare, Hyde, Beaufort, Washington, and Tyrrell counties.
Melvin Daniels Jr. (Elizabeth City)	Democratic	January 1, 1975 – January 1, 1983	Redistricted to the single-member district.	J. J. Harrington (Lewiston)	Democratic	January 1, 1967 – January 1, 1983	Redistricted from the 3rd district. Redistricted to the 2nd district.	1973–1983; All of Northampton, Bertie, Hertford, Gates, Chowan, Perquimans, Pasquotank, Camden, Currituck, Dare, Hyde, Beaufort, Washington, and Tyrrell counties.

=== Single-member district ===
Senator	Party	Dates	Notes	Counties
Melvin Daniels Jr. (Elizabeth City)	Democratic	January 1, 1983 – January 1, 1985	Redistricted from the multi-member district.	1983–1985; All of Perquimans, Pasquotank, Camden, Currituck, Dare, Hyde, Tyrrell, Parts of Washington and Beaufort counties.
Marc Basnight (Manteo)	Democratic	January 1, 1985 – January 25, 2011	Resigned.	1985–1993; All of Chowan, Perquimans, Pasquotank, Camden, Currituck, Washington, Tyrrell, Dare, and Hyde counties. Parts of Beaufort, Bertie, and Gates counties.
Marc Basnight (Manteo)	Democratic	January 1, 1985 – January 25, 2011	Resigned.	1993–2003; All of Chowan, Perquimans, Pasquotank, Camden, Currituck, Tyrrell, Dare, and Hyde counties. Parts of Beaufort, Washington, and Bertie counties.
Marc Basnight (Manteo)	Democratic	January 1, 1985 – January 25, 2011	Resigned.	2003–2005; All of Chowan, Perquimans, Pasquotank, Camden, Currituck, Dare, Hyde, and Beaufort counties.
Marc Basnight (Manteo)	Democratic	January 1, 1985 – January 25, 2011	Resigned.	2005–2013; All of Pasquotank, Camden, Currituck, Washington, Tyrrell, Dare, Hyde, and Beaufort counties.
Vacant		January 25, 2011 – January 26, 2011		2005–2013; All of Pasquotank, Camden, Currituck, Washington, Tyrrell, Dare, Hyde, and Beaufort counties.
Stan White (Nags Head)	Democratic	January 26, 2011 – January 1, 2013	Appointed to finish Basnight's term. Lost re-election.	2005–2013; All of Pasquotank, Camden, Currituck, Washington, Tyrrell, Dare, Hyde, and Beaufort counties.
Bill Cook (Chocowinity)	Republican	January 1, 2013 – January 1, 2019	Redistricted to the 3rd district and retired.	2013–2019; All of Gates, Perquimans, Pasquotank, Camden, Currituck, Dare, Hyde, and Beaufort counties.
Bob Steinburg (Edenton)	Republican	January 1, 2019 – July 31, 2022	Lost re-nomination and resigned.	2019–2023; All of Hertford, Gates, Chowan, Perquimans, Pasquotank, Camden, Currituck, Washington, Tyrrell, Dare, and Hyde counties.
Vacant		July 31, 2022 – August 29, 2022		2019–2023; All of Hertford, Gates, Chowan, Perquimans, Pasquotank, Camden, Currituck, Washington, Tyrrell, Dare, and Hyde counties.
Bobby Hanig (Powells Point)	Republican	August 29, 2022 – January 1, 2023	Appointed to finish Steinburg's term. Redistricted to the 3rd district.	2019–2023; All of Hertford, Gates, Chowan, Perquimans, Pasquotank, Camden, Currituck, Washington, Tyrrell, Dare, and Hyde counties.
Norman Sanderson (Minnesott Beach)	Republican	January 1, 2023 – January 1, 2025	Redistricted from the 2nd district. Redistricted to the 2nd district.	2023–2025; All of Pasquotank, Perquimans, Chowan, Washington, Dare, Hyde, Carteret, and Pamlico counties.
Bobby Hanig (Powells Point)	Republican	January 1, 2025 – Present	Redistricted from the 3rd district.	2025–Present; All of Bertie, Northampton, Hertford, Gates, Perquimans, Pasquotank, Camden, Currituck, Tyrrell, and Dare counties.

== Election results ==
=== 2024 ===
North Carolina Senate 1st district general election, 2024
Party	Candidate	Votes	%
Republican	Bobby Hanig (incumbent)	62,805	57.21%
Democratic	Susan Harman-Scott	46,979	42.79%
Total votes		109,784	100%
Republican hold			

=== 2022 ===
North Carolina Senate 1st district Republican primary election, 2022
Party	Candidate	Votes	%
Republican	Norman Sanderson (incumbent)	12,713	55.48%
Republican	Bob Steinburg (incumbent)	10,201	44.52%
Total votes		22,914	100%

North Carolina Senate 1st district general election, 2022
Party	Candidate	Votes	%
Republican	Norman Sanderson (incumbent)	61,486	100%
Total votes		61,486	100%
Republican hold			

=== 2020 ===
North Carolina Senate 1st district general election, 2020
Party	Candidate	Votes	%
Republican	Bob Steinburg (incumbent)	58,319	55.24%
Democratic	Tess Judge	47,248	44.76%
Total votes		105,567	100%
Republican hold			

=== 2018 ===
North Carolina Senate 1st district Republican primary election, 2018
Party	Candidate	Votes	%
Republican	Bob Steinburg	6,785	58.04%
Republican	Clark Twiddy	4,905	41.96%
Total votes		11,690	100%

North Carolina Senate 1st district general election, 2018
Party	Candidate	Votes	%
Republican	Bob Steinburg	39,815	53.21%
Democratic	D. Cole Phelps	35,017	46.79%
Total votes		74,832	100%
Republican win (new seat)			

=== 2016 ===
North Carolina Senate 1st district general election, 2016
Party	Candidate	Votes	%
Republican	Bill Cook (incumbent)	53,138	59.11%
Democratic	Brownie Futrell	36,759	40.89%
Total votes		89,897	100%
Republican hold			

=== 2014 ===
North Carolina Senate 1st district Democratic primary election, 2014
Party	Candidate	Votes	%
Democratic	Stan White	9,828	75.86%
Democratic	Judy Krahenbuhl	3,127	24.14%
Total votes		12,955	100%

North Carolina Senate 1st district general election, 2014
Party	Candidate	Votes	%
Republican	Bill Cook (incumbent)	32,143	53.48%
Democratic	Stan White	27,957	46.52%
Total votes		60,100	100%
Republican hold			

=== 2012 ===
North Carolina Senate 1st district Republican primary election, 2012
Party	Candidate	Votes	%
Republican	Bill Cook	8,243	62.93%
Republican	Jerry Evans	4,855	37.07%
Total votes		13,098	100%

North Carolina Senate 1st district general election, 2012
Party	Candidate	Votes	%
Republican	Bill Cook	43,735	50.01%
Democratic	Stan White (incumbent)	43,714	49.99%
Total votes		87,449	100%
Republican gain from Democratic			

=== 2010 ===
North Carolina Senate 1st district general election, 2010
Party	Candidate	Votes	%
Democratic	Marc Basnight (incumbent)	31,270	55.40%
Republican	Hood Richardson	25,169	44.60%
Total votes		56,439	100%
Democratic hold			

=== 2008 ===
North Carolina Senate 1st district general election, 2008
Party	Candidate	Votes	%
Democratic	Marc Basnight (incumbent)	62,661	100%
Total votes		62,661	100%
Democratic hold			

=== 2006 ===
North Carolina Senate 1st district Republican primary election, 2006
Party	Candidate	Votes	%
Republican	Ron Toppin	2,818	51.23%
Republican	Hood Richardson	2,683	48.77%
Total votes		5,501	100%

North Carolina Senate 1st district general election, 2006
Party	Candidate	Votes	%
Democratic	Marc Basnight (incumbent)	30,398	68.84%
Republican	Ron Toppin	13,758	31.16%
Total votes		44,156	100%
Democratic hold			

=== 2004 ===
North Carolina Senate 1st district general election, 2004
Party	Candidate	Votes	%
Democratic	Marc Basnight (incumbent)	45,367	64.69%
Republican	Ron Toppin	24,759	35.31%
Total votes		70,126	100%
Democratic hold			

=== 2002 ===
North Carolina Senate 1st district general election, 2002
Party	Candidate	Votes	%
Democratic	Marc Basnight (incumbent)	32,723	66.63%
Republican	Ron Toppin	16,392	33.37%
Total votes		49,115	100%
Democratic hold			

=== 2000 ===
North Carolina Senate 1st district general election, 2000
Party	Candidate	Votes	%
Democratic	Marc Basnight (incumbent)	39,069	70.31%
Republican	Ronald Toppin	16,495	29.69%
Total votes		55,564	100%
Democratic hold			
