= 2022 North Carolina Senate election =

- November 8, 2022

All 50 seats in the North Carolina Senate 26 (without Lieutenant Governor) seats needed for a majority
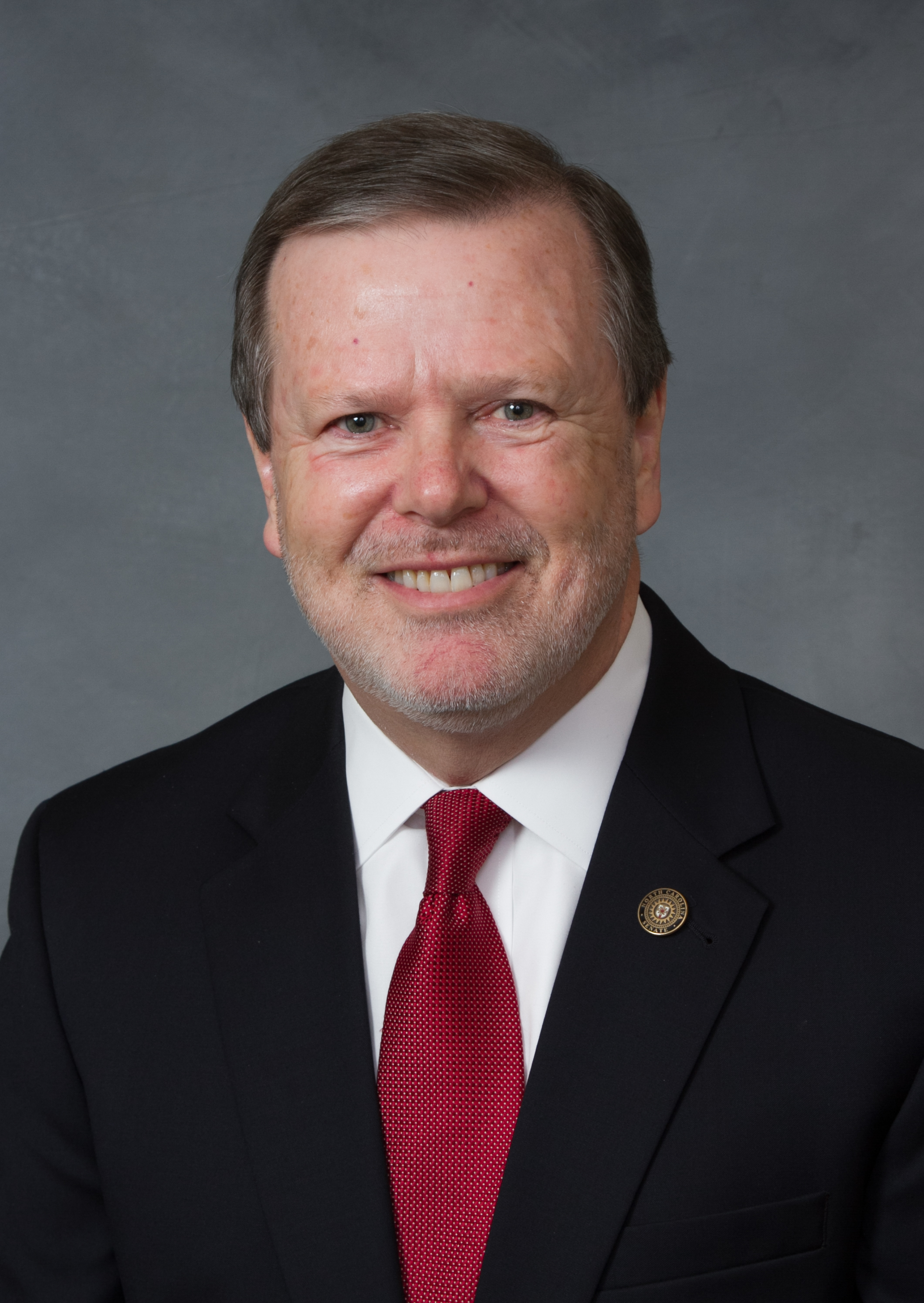

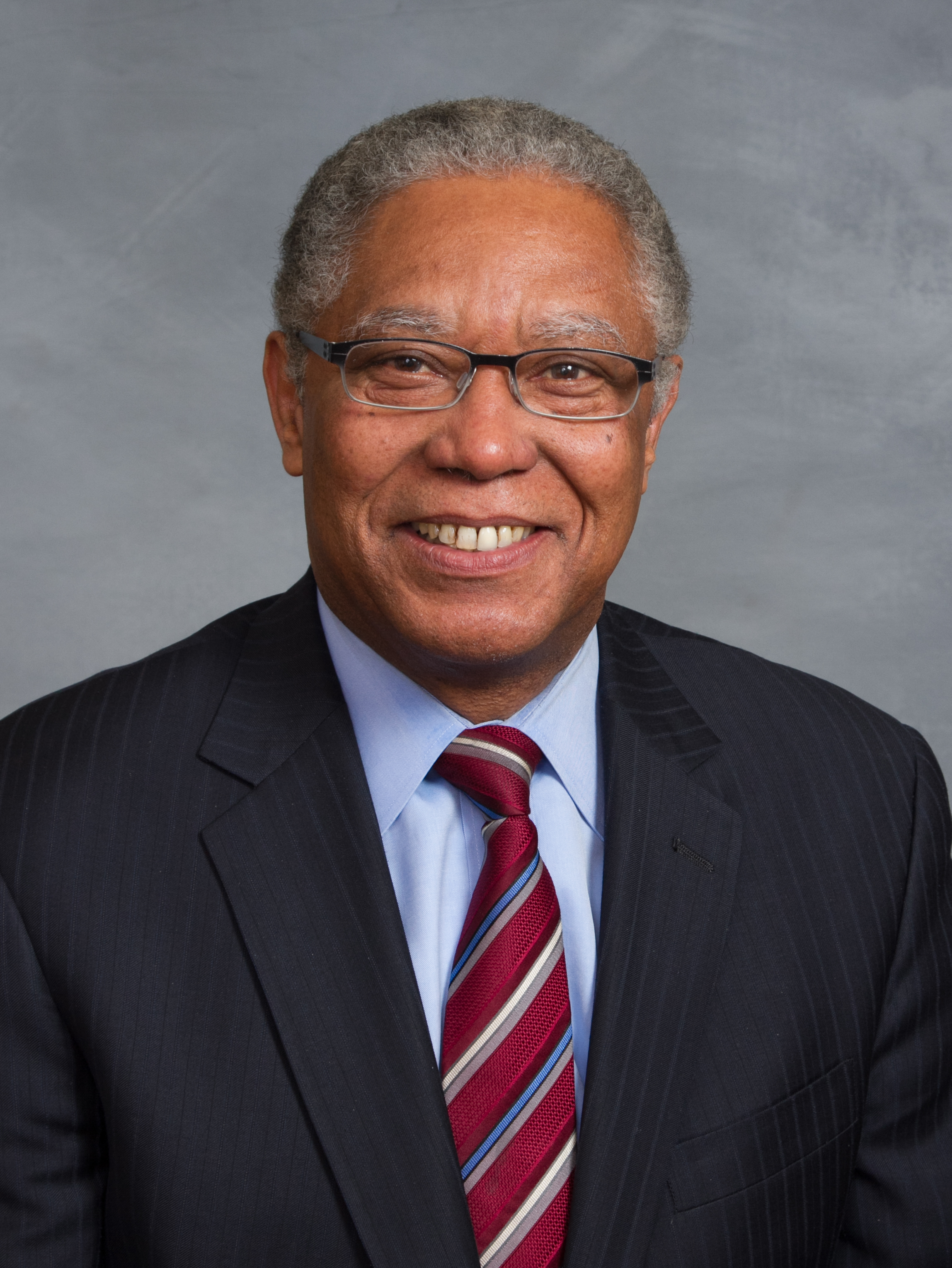
	Majority party	Minority party
Leader	Phil Berger	Dan Blue
Party	Republican	Democratic
Leader since	January 1, 2005	March 2, 2014
Leader's seat	26th - Eden	14th - Raleigh
Last election	28	22
Seats won	30	20
Seat change	▲2	▼2
Popular vote	2,030,600	1,401,741
Percentage	58.73%	40.54%
- Democratic hold Democratic gain Republican hold Republican gain Republican: 50–60% 60–70% 70–80% 80–90% >90% Democratic: 50–60% 60-70% 70–80% >90%
President pro tempore before election
Phil Berger
Republican
Elected President pro tempore
Phil Berger
Republican

An election was held on November 8, 2022, to elect all 50 members to North Carolina's Senate. The election coincided with the elections for other offices, including the U.S. Senate, U.S. House of Representatives, and state house. The filing period lasted from February 24, 2022, to March 4, 2022, with the primary election being held on May 17, 2022 (prior to the redistricting challenges it was scheduled to be held on March 8, 2022). The elections were originally to be held under new districts passed by the General Assembly in Senate Bill 739 to account for population changes following the 2020 census; however, following a ruling by the North Carolina Supreme Court, the General Assembly redrew the maps (Senate Bill 744) to comply with the court's ruling.

== Predictions ==
Source	Ranking	As of
Sabato's Crystal Ball	Likely R	May 19, 2022

== Results summary ==
District	Incumbent	Party	Elected	Party
1st	Norman Sanderson (Note: Redistricted from the 2nd district.)	Rep	Norman Sanderson	Rep
2nd	Jim Perry (Note: Redistricted from the 7th district.)	Rep	Jim Perry	Rep
3rd	Bobby Hanig (Note: Redistricted from the 1st district.)	Rep	Bobby Hanig	Rep
3rd	Ernestine Bazemore	Dem	Bobby Hanig	Rep
4th	Toby Fitch	Dem	Buck Newton	Rep
5th	Don Davis†	Dem	Kandie Smith	Dem
6th	Michael Lazzara	Rep	Michael Lazzara	Rep
7th	Michael Lee (Note: Redistricted from the 9th district.)	Rep	Michael Lee	Rep
8th	Bill Rabon	Rep	Bill Rabon	Rep
9th	Brent Jackson (Note: Redistricted from the 10th district.)	Rep	Brent Jackson	Rep
10th	New Seat		Benton Sawrey	Rep
11th	Lisa Stone Barnes	Rep	Lisa Stone Barnes	Rep
12th	Jim Burgin	Rep	Jim Burgin	Rep
13th	New Seat		Lisa Grafstein	Dem
14th	Dan Blue	Dem	Dan Blue	Dem
15th	Jay Chaudhuri	Dem	Jay Chaudhuri	Dem
16th	Wiley Nickel†	Dem	Gale Adcock	Dem
17th	Sydney Batch	Dem	Sydney Batch	Dem
18th	Sarah Crawford†	Dem	Mary Wills Bode	Dem
19th	Kirk deViere	Dem	Val Applewhite	Dem
20th	Natalie Murdock	Dem	Natalie Murdock	Dem
21st	Tom McInnis (Note: Redistricted from the 25th district.)	Rep	Tom McInnis	Rep
22nd	Mike Woodard	Dem	Mike Woodard	Dem
23rd	Valerie Foushee†	Dem	Graig Meyer	Dem
24th	Danny Britt (Note: Redistricted from the 13th district.)	Rep	Danny Britt	Rep
24th	Ben Clark† (Note: Redistricted from the 21st district.)	Dem	Danny Britt	Rep
25th	Amy Galey (Note: Redistricted from the 24th district.)	Rep	Amy Galey	Rep
26th	Phil Berger (Note: Redistricted from the 30th district.)	Rep	Phil Berger	Rep
27th	Michael Garrett	Dem	Michael Garrett	Dem
28th	Gladys Robinson	Dem	Gladys Robinson	Dem
29th	Dave Craven (Note: Redistricted from the 26th district.)	Rep	Dave Craven	Rep
30th	Steve Jarvis (Note: Redistricted from the 29th district.)	Rep	Steve Jarvis	Rep
31st	Joyce Krawiec	Rep	Joyce Krawiec	Rep
32nd	Paul Lowe Jr.	Dem	Paul Lowe Jr.	Dem
33rd	Carl Ford	Rep	Carl Ford	Rep
34th	Paul Newton (Note: Redistricted from the 36th district.)	Rep	Paul Newton	Rep
35th	Todd Johnson	Rep	Todd Johnson	Rep
36th	New Seat		Eddie Settle	Rep
37th	Vickie Sawyer (Note: Redistricted from the 34th district.)	Rep	Vickie Sawyer	Rep
38th	Mujtaba Mohammed	Dem	Mujtaba Mohammed	Dem
39th	DeAndrea Salvador	Dem	DeAndrea Salvador	Dem
40th	Joyce Waddell	Dem	Joyce Waddell	Dem
41st	Natasha Marcus	Dem	Natasha Marcus	Dem
42nd	Jeff Jackson† (Note: Redistricted from the 37th district.)	Dem	Rachel Hunt	Dem
43rd	Kathy Harrington†	Rep	Brad Overcash	Rep
44th	Ted Alexander	Rep	Ted Alexander	Rep
45th	Dean Proctor (Note: Redistricted from the 42nd district.)	Rep	Dean Proctor	Rep
46th	Warren Daniel	Rep	Warren Daniel	Rep
47th	Ralph Hise	Rep	Ralph Hise	Rep
47th	Deanna Ballard (Note: Redistricted from the 45th district.)	Rep	Ralph Hise	Rep
48th	Chuck Edwards†	Rep	Tim Moffitt	Rep
49th	Julie Mayfield	Dem	Julie Mayfield	Dem
50th	Kevin Corbin	Rep	Kevin Corbin	Rep

† - Incumbent not seeking re-election

Party	Candi- dates	Votes		Seats		
Party	Candi- dates	No.	%	No.	+/–	%
Republican	49	2,030,556	58.726	30	▲2	60
Democratic	36	1,401,684	40.538	20	▼2	40
Libertarian	7	14,562	0.421	0	Steady	0
Write-in	1	9,506	0.275	0	Steady	0
Green	1	1,348	0.039	0	Steady	0
Total	94	3,457,656	100	50	Steady	100

Senate seats
Republican	60%
Democratic	40%

Popular vote
Republican	58.726%
Democratic	40.538%
Libertarian	0.421%
Write-in	0.275%
Green	0.039%

=== Close races ===
Districts where the margin of victory was under 10%:

1. District 7, 1.94%
2. District 5, 4.46%
3. District 3, 5.06%
4. District 18, 5.39%
5. District 19, 5.4%
6. District 17, 5.86%
7. District 27, 9%
8. District 21, 9.26%
9. District 11, 9.7%
10. District 42, 9.92%

=== Incumbents defeated in the primary election ===
==== Democrats ====
1. District 3: Ernestine Bazemore lost re-nomination to Valerie Jordan.
2. District 19: Kirk DeViere lost re-nomination to Val Applewhite.

==== Republicans ====
1. District 1: Bob Steinburg lost re-nomination to fellow incumbent Norman Sanderson in a redistricting race.
2. District 47: Deanna Ballard lost re-nomination to fellow incumbent Ralph Hise in a redistricting race.

=== Incumbents defeated in the general election ===
==== Democrats ====
- Toby Fitch (D-District 4), defeated by Buck Newton (R)

=== Open seats that changed parties ===
- Ernestine Bazemore (D-District 3) lost re-nomination, seat won by Bobby Hanig (R)

=== Newly created seats ===
- District 10 (Johnston County), won by Benton Sawrey (R)
- District 13 (Wake County), won by Lisa Grafstein (D)
- District 36 (Alexander, Wilkes, Surry, and Yadkin counties), won by Eddie Settle (R)

== Detailed results ==
=== Districts 1–25 ===
==== District 1 ====
The new 1st District includes all of Dare, Hyde, Carteret, Pamlico, Washington, Chowan, Perquimans, and Pasquotank counties. It includes the home of incumbent Republicans Bob Steinburg, who had represented the 1st district since 2019, and Norman Sanderson, who had represented the 2nd District since 2013. Sanderson defeated Steinburg to win the Republican nomination.

North Carolina Senate 1st district Republican primary election, 2022
Party	Candidate	Votes	%
Republican	Norman Sanderson (incumbent)	12,713	55.48%
Republican	Bob Steinburg (incumbent)	10,201	44.52%
Total votes		22,914	100%

North Carolina Senate 1st district general election, 2022
Party	Candidate	Votes	%
Republican	Norman Sanderson (incumbent)	61,486	100%
Total votes		61,486	100%
Republican hold			

==== District 2 ====
The new 2nd District includes all of Beaufort, Craven, and Lenoir counties. The district includes the home of incumbent Republican Jim Perry, who had represented the 7th District since 2019. He ran for re-election.

North Carolina Senate 2nd district general election, 2022
Party	Candidate	Votes	%
Republican	Jim Perry (incumbent)	53,067	100%
Total votes		53,067	100%
Republican hold			

==== District 3 ====
The new 3rd District includes all of Warren, Northampton, Halifax, Martin, Bertie, Hertford, Gates, Camden, Currituck, and Tyrrell counties. Incumbent Democrat Ernestine Bazemore had represented the 3rd District since 2021. Valerie Jordan defeated Bazemore to win the Democratic nomination. State representative Bobby Hanig was unopposed for the Republican nomination.

North Carolina Senate 3rd district Democratic primary election, 2022
Party	Candidate	Votes	%
Democratic	Valerie Jordan	13,644	59.65%
Democratic	Ernestine Bazemore (incumbent)	9,229	40.35%
Total votes		22,873	100%

North Carolina Senate 3rd district general election, 2022
Party	Candidate	Votes	%
Republican	Bobby Hanig (incumbent) (Note: Hanig was appointed to finish the Remainder of Bob Steinburg's term in the 1st district. Hanig was re-elected in the 3rd district.)	37,984	52.53%
Democratic	Valerie Jordan	34,320	47.47%
Total votes		72,304	100%
Republican hold			

==== District 4 ====
The new 4th District includes all of Greene, Wayne, and Wilson counties. Incumbent Democrat Toby Fitch had represented the 4th District since 2018. State Representative Raymond Smith Jr. unsuccessfully challenged Fitch for the Democratic nomination. Former state senator Buck Newton won the Republican nomination.

North Carolina Senate 4th district Democratic primary election, 2022
Party	Candidate	Votes	%
Democratic	Toby Fitch (incumbent)	6,994	54.48%
Democratic	Raymond Smith Jr.	5,843	45.52%
Total votes		12,837	100%

North Carolina Senate 4th district Republican primary election, 2022
Party	Candidate	Votes	%
Republican	Buck Newton	8,728	67.61%
Republican	Joe Democko	4,181	32.39%
Total votes		12,909	100%

North Carolina Senate 4th district general election, 2022
Party	Candidate	Votes	%
Republican	Buck Newton	38,638	57.51%
Democratic	Toby Fitch (incumbent)	28,543	42.49%
Total votes		67,181	100%
Republican gain from Democratic			

==== District 5 ====
The new 5th District includes all of Edgecombe and Pitt counties. Incumbent Democrat Don Davis had represented the 5th District since 2013. Davis retired to run for Congress. State representative Kandie Smith won the Democratic nomination for the seat.

North Carolina Senate 5th district Democratic primary election, 2022
Party	Candidate	Votes	%
Democratic	Kandie Smith	13,604	86.58%
Democratic	Lenton Brown	2,109	13.42%
Total votes		15,713	100%

North Carolina Senate 5th district general election, 2022
Party	Candidate	Votes	%
Democratic	Kandie Smith	36,557	52.23%
Republican	Karen Kozel	33,432	47.77%
Total votes		69,989	100%
Democratic hold			

==== District 6 ====
The new 6th District includes all of Onslow County. Incumbent Republican Michael Lazzara had represented the 6th District since 2021.

North Carolina Senate 6th district general election, 2022
Party	Candidate	Votes	%
Republican	Michael Lazzara (incumbent)	33,339	100%
Total votes		33,339	100%
Republican hold			

==== District 7 ====
The new 7th District includes most of New Hanover County. The new district includes the home of incumbent Republican Michael Lee, who had represented the 9th District since 2021. The original Democratic nominee was Jason Minnicozzi; however, Minnicozzi dropped out and was replaced on the ballot by Marcia Morgan.

North Carolina Senate 7th district general election, 2022
Party	Candidate	Votes	%
Republican	Michael Lee (incumbent)	44,908	50.97%
Democratic	Marcia Morgan	43,198	49.03%
Total votes		88,106	100%
Republican hold			

==== District 8 ====
The new 8th District includes all of Columbus and Brunswick counties as well as part of New Hanover County. Incumbent Republican Bill Rabon had represented the 8th District since 2011.

North Carolina Senate 8th district general election, 2022
Party	Candidate	Votes	%
Republican	Bill Rabon (incumbent)	67,693	100%
Total votes		67,693	100%
Republican hold			

==== District 9 ====
The new 9th District includes all of Jones, Duplin, Pender, and Bladen counties as well as most of Sampson County. The district includes the home of incumbent Republican Brent Jackson, who had represented the 10th District since 2011.

North Carolina Senate 9th district general election, 2022
Party	Candidate	Votes	%
Republican	Brent Jackson (incumbent)	50,252	100%
Total votes		50,252	100%
Republican hold			

==== District 10 ====
The new 10th District includes all of Johnston County and had no incumbent. Benton Sawrey won the Republican nomination.

North Carolina Senate 10th district Republican primary election, 2022
Party	Candidate	Votes	%
Republican	Benton Sawrey	12,318	65.60%
Republican	Jill Homan	3,729	19.86%
Republican	Matt Ansley	2,730	14.54%
Total votes		18,777	100%

North Carolina Senate 10th district general election, 2022
Party	Candidate	Votes	%
Republican	Benton Sawrey	48,083	63.90%
Democratic	Gettys Cohen Jr.	27,165	36.10%
Total votes		75,248	100%
Republican win (new seat)			

==== District 11 ====
The new 11th District includes all of Nash, Franklin, and Vance counties. Incumbent Republican Lisa Stone Barnes had represented the 11th District since 2021. She ran for re-election.

North Carolina Senate 11th district general election, 2022
Party	Candidate	Votes	%
Republican	Lisa Stone Barnes (incumbent)	41,701	54.85%
Democratic	Mark Speed	34,333	45.15%
Total votes		76,034	100%
Republican hold			

==== District 12 ====
The new 12th District includes all of Harnett and Lee counties as well as a small portion of Sampson County. Incumbent Republican Jim Burgin had represented the 12th District since 2019. David Buboltz and Ernie Watson unsuccessfully challenged Burgin for the Republican nomination.

North Carolina Senate 12th district Republican primary, 2022
Party	Candidate	Votes	%
Republican	Jim Burgin (incumbent)	6,511	52.85%
Republican	David Buboltz	4,495	36.49%
Republican	Ernie Watson	1,314	10.67%
Total votes		12,320	100%

North Carolina Senate 12th district general election, 2022
Party	Candidate	Votes	%
Republican	Jim Burgin (incumbent)	36,304	63.45%
Democratic	Richard Chapman	20,914	36.55%
Total votes		57,218	100%
Republican hold			

==== District 13 ====
The new 13th District includes portions of northern Wake County and had no incumbent. Lisa Grafstein won the Democratic nomination. David Bankert won the Republican nomination.

North Carolina Senate 13th district Democratic primary, 2022
Party	Candidate	Votes	%
Democratic	Lisa Grafstein	11,931	66.59%
Democratic	Patrick Buffkin	5,987	33.41%
Total votes		17,918	100%

North Carolina Senate 13th district Republican primary, 2022
Party	Candidate	Votes	%
Republican	David Bankert	5,230	52.23%
Republican	Jeff Werner	4,783	47.77%
Total votes		10,013	100%

North Carolina Senate 13th district general election, 2022
Party	Candidate	Votes	%
Democratic	Lisa Grafstein	50,937	62.34%
Republican	David Bankert	28,001	34.27%
Libertarian	Michael Munger	2,769	3.39%
Total votes		81,707	100%
Democratic win (new seat)			

==== District 14 ====
The new 14th District includes portions of eastern Wake County. Incumbent Democratic Minority Leader Dan Blue had represented the 14th District since 2009.

North Carolina Senate 14th district general election, 2022
Party	Candidate	Votes	%
Democratic	Dan Blue (incumbent)	45,020	68.97%
Republican	Chris Baker	18,378	28.16%
Libertarian	Matthew Laszacs	1,875	2.87%
Total votes		65,273	100%
Democratic hold			

==== District 15 ====
The new 15th District includes portions of central Wake County. Incumbent Democrat Jay Chaudhuri had represented the 15th District and its predecessors since 2016.

North Carolina Senate district general election, 2022
Party	Candidate	Votes	%
Democratic	Jay Chaudhuri (incumbent)	52,472	67.52%
Republican	Emanuela Prister	22,776	29.31%
Libertarian	Sammie Brooks	2,463	3.17%
Total votes		77,711	100%
Democratic hold			

==== District 16 ====
The new 16th District includes portions of western Wake County. Incumbent Democrat Wiley Nickel had represented the 16th District since 2019. Nickel ran for congress and did not seek re-election. State Representative Gale Adcock announced that she would seek the Democratic nomination for the seat.

North Carolina Senate 16th district general election, 2022
Party	Candidate	Votes	%
Democratic	Gale Adcock	49,204	65.18%
Republican	James Powers	23,161	30.68%
Libertarian	Dee Watson	1,771	2.35%
Green	Michael Trudeau	1,348	1.79%
Total votes		75,484	100%
Democratic hold			

==== District 17 ====
The new 17th District includes portions of southern Wake County. Incumbent Democrat Sydney Batch had represented the 17th District since her appointment on January 11, 2021.

North Carolina Senate 17th district general election, 2022
Party	Candidate	Votes	%
Democratic	Sydney Batch (incumbent)	45,279	51.83%
Republican	Mark Cavaliero	40,167	45.97%
Libertarian	Patrick J. Bowersox	1,922	2.20%
Total votes		87,368	100%
Democratic hold			

==== District 18 ====
The new 18th District includes all of Granvile County as well a portion of northern Wake County. Incumbent Democrat Sarah Crawford had represented the 18th District since 2021. Crawford ran for the state house. E. C. Sykes won the Republican nomination.

North Carolina State Senate 18th district Republican primary election, 2022
Party	Candidate	Votes	%
Republican	E. C. Sykes	11,124	84.86%
Republican	Dimitry Slabyak	1,985	15.14%
Total votes		13,109	100%

North Carolina Senate 18th district general election, 2022
Party	Candidate	Votes	%
Democratic	Mary Wills Bode	42,783	51.36%
Republican	E. C. Sykes	38,296	45.97%
Libertarian	Ryan Brown	2,219	2.66%
Total votes		83,298	100%
Democratic hold			

==== District 19 ====
The new 19th District includes most of Cumberland County. Incumbent Democrat Kirk deViere had represented the 19th District since 2019. Val Applewhite defeated deViere to win the Democratic nomination. Former senator Wesley Meredith won the Republican nomination.

Democratic primary polling

Poll source	Date(s) administered	Sample size (Note: Key: A – all adults RV – registered voters LV – likely voters V – unclear)	Margin of error	Val Applewhite	Kirk deViere	Ed Donaldson	Undecided
Public Policy Polling (D) (Note: Poll sponsored by Applewhite's campaign)	March 11–13, 2022	391 (LV)	± 5.0%	32%	17%	9%	42%

North Carolina Senate 19th district Democratic primary election, 2022
Party	Candidate	Votes	%
Democratic	Val Applewhite	7,588	56.24%
Democratic	Kirk deViere (incumbent)	4,972	36.85%
Democratic	Ed Donaldson	931	6.90%
Total votes		13,491	100%

North Carolina Senate 19th district Republican primary election, 2022
Party	Candidate	Votes	%
Republican	Wesley Meredith	5,781	72.42%
Republican	Dennis Britt	2,202	27.58%
Total votes		7,983	100%

North Carolina Senate 19th district general election, 2022
Party	Candidate	Votes	%
Democratic	Val Applewhite	30,755	52.70%
Republican	Wesley Meredith	27,601	47.30%
Total votes		58,356	100%
Democratic hold			

==== District 20 ====
The new 20th District includes all of Chatham County and portions of southern Durham County. Incumbent Democrat Natalie Murdock had represented the 20th District since 2020.

North Carolina Senate 20th district general election, 2022
Party	Candidate	Votes	%
Democratic	Natalie Murdock (incumbent)	64,550	72.83%
Republican	Alvin Reed	24,085	27.17%
Total votes		88,635	100%
Democratic hold			

==== District 21 ====
The new 21st District includes all of Moore County as well as portions of Northwestern Cumberland County. When the district was drawn it originally had no incumbent, but Republican Tom McInnis switched his residence to Moore County so that he could run for re-election in the new district.

North Carolina Senate 21st district general election, 2022
Party	Candidate	Votes	%
Republican	Tom McInnis (incumbent)	36,468	54.63%
Democratic	Frank McNeill Jr.	30,281	45.37%
Total votes		66,749	100%
Republican hold			

==== District 22 ====
The new 22nd District includes most of Durham County. Incumbent Democrat Mike Woodard had represented the 22nd District since 2013. Larry Coleman won the Republican nomination.

North Carolina Senate 22nd district Republican primary election, 2022
Party	Candidate	Votes	%
Republican	Larry Coleman	3,189	68.55%
Republican	John Tarantino	1,463	31.45%
Total votes		4,652	100%

North Carolina Senate 22nd district general election, 2022
Party	Candidate	Votes	%
Democratic	Mike Woodard (incumbent)	60,402	78.43%
Republican	Larry Coleman	15,070	19.57%
Libertarian	Ray Ubinger	1,543	2.00%
Total votes		77,015	100%
Democratic hold			

==== District 23 ====
The new 23rd District includes all of Caswell, Person, and Orange counties. Incumbent Democrat Valerie Foushee had represented the 23rd District since 2013. Foushee retired to run for Congress. State Representative Graig Meyer won the Democratic nomination. Landon Woods won the Republican nomination.

North Carolina Senate 23rd district Democratic primary election, 2022
Party	Candidate	Votes	%
Democratic	Graig Meyer	23,717	82.38%
Democratic	Jamie DeMent Holcomb	5,072	17.62%
Total votes		28,789	100%

North Carolina Senate 23rd district Republican primary election, 2022
Party	Candidate	Votes	%
Republican	Landon Woods	5,798	58.29%
Republican	Bill Cooke	4,149	41.71%
Total votes		9,947	100%

North Carolina Senate 23rd district general election, 2022
Party	Candidate	Votes	%
Democratic	Graig Meyer	59,973	67.30%
Republican	Landon Woods	29,140	32.70%
Total votes		89,113	100%
Democratic hold			

==== District 24 ====
The new 24th District includes all of Robeson, Hoke, and Scotland counties. The new district includes the home of incumbent Republican Danny Britt, who had represented the 13th District since 2017, and incumbent Democrat Ben Clark, who had represented the 21st District since 2013. Clark did not seek re-election.

North Carolina Senate 24th district general election, 2022
Party	Candidate	Votes	%
Republican	Danny Britt (incumbent)	28,761	58.32%
Democratic	Darrel "BJ" Gibson Jr.	20,551	41.68%
Total votes		49,312	100%
Republican hold			

==== District 25 ====
The new 25th District includes all of Alamance County as well as portions of Northeastern Randolph County. The district includes the home of incumbent Republican Amy Galey, who had represented the 24th District since 2021.

North Carolina Senate 25th district general election, 2022
Party	Candidate	Votes	%
Republican	Amy Galey (incumbent)	47,355	62.82%
Democratic	Sean C. Ewing	28,031	37.18%
Total votes		75,386	100%
Republican hold			

=== Districts 26–50 ===
==== District 26 ====
The new 26th District includes all of Rockingham County as well as portions of northern and eastern Guilford County. The district includes the home of incumbent Republican president pro tempore Phil Berger, who had represented the 30th District and its predecessors since 2001.

North Carolina Senate 26th district general election, 2022
Party	Candidate	Votes	%
Republican	Phil Berger (incumbent)	54,717	85.20%
Write-in		7,882	12.27%
Independent	Alvin D. Robinson (write-in)	1,624	2.53%
Total votes		64,223	100%
Republican hold			

==== District 27 ====
The new 27th District includes portions of western and southern Guilford County. Incumbent Democrat Michael Garrett had represented the 27th District since 2019.

North Carolina Senate 27th district general election, 2022
Party	Candidate	Votes	%
Democratic	Michael Garrett (incumbent)	37,055	54.50%
Republican	Richard "Josh" Sessoms	30,932	45.50%
Total votes		67,987	100%
Democratic hold			

==== District 28 ====
The new 28th District includes portions of central Guilford County. Incumbent Democrat Gladys Robinson had represented the 28th District since 2011.

North Carolina Senate 28th district general election, 2022
Party	Candidate	Votes	%
Democratic	Gladys Robinson (incumbent)	46,455	73.05%
Republican	Paul Schumacher	17,140	26.95%
Total votes		63,595	100%
Democratic hold			

==== District 29 ====
The new 29th District includes all of Anson, Richmond, and Montgomery counties as well as portions of Randolph and Union counties. The district includes the home of incumbent Republicans Tom McInnis, who had represented the 25th District since 2015, and Dave Craven, who had represented the 26th District since 2020. McInnis switched his residence from Richmond County to Moore County and ran for re-election in the new 21st District.

North Carolina Senate 29th district general election, 2022
Party	Candidate	Votes	%
Republican	Dave Craven (incumbent)	51,618	73.05%
Democratic	Brooke Crump	19,048	26.95%
Total votes		70,666	100%
Republican hold			

==== District 30 ====
The new 30th District includes all of Davidson and Davie counties. The district includes the home of incumbent Republican Steve Jarvis, who had represented the 29th District since 2021. Former state Senator Eddie Gallimore unsuccessfully challenged Jarvis for the Republican nomination.

North Carolina Senate 30th district Republican primary election, 2022
Party	Candidate	Votes	%
Republican	Steve Jarvis (incumbent)	15,986	65.69%
Republican	Eddie Gallimore	8,348	34.31%
Total votes		24,334	100%

North Carolina Senate 30th district general election, 2022
Party	Candidate	Votes	%
Republican	Steve Jarvis (incumbent)	59,091	76.60%
Democratic	Monique D. Johnson	18,051	23.40%
Total votes		77,142	100%
Republican hold			

==== District 31 ====
The new 31st District includes all of Stokes County as well as portions of northern and eastern Forsyth County. Incumbent Republican Joyce Krawiec had represented the 31st District since 2014.

North Carolina Senate 31st district general election, 2022
Party	Candidate	Votes	%
Republican	Joyce Krawiec (incumbent)	48,815	100%
Total votes		48,815	100%
Republican hold			

==== District 32 ====
The new 32nd District includes portions of western and southern Forsyth County. Incumbent Democrat Paul Lowe Jr. had represented the 32nd District since 2015.

North Carolina Senate 32nd district general election, 2022
Party	Candidate	Votes	%
Democratic	Paul Lowe Jr. (incumbent)	46,986	59.32%
Republican	George K. Ware	32,220	40.68%
Total votes		79,206	100%
Democratic hold			

==== District 33 ====
The new 33rd District includes all Rowan and Stanly counties. Incumbent Republican Carl Ford had represented the 33rd District since 2019.

North Carolina Senate 33rd district general election, 2022
Party	Candidate	Votes	%
Republican	Carl Ford (incumbent)	52,235	73.27%
Democratic	Tangela "Lucy Horne" Morgan	19,058	26.73%
Total votes		71,293	100%
Republican hold			

==== District 34 ====
The new 34th District includes most of Cabarrus County. The district includes the home of incumbent Republican Paul Newton, who had represented the 36th District since 2017.

North Carolina Senate 34th district general election, 2022
Party	Candidate	Votes	%
Republican	Paul Newton (incumbent)	40,991	56.90%
Democratic	Keshia Sandidge	31,044	43.10%
Total votes		72,035	100%
Republican hold			

==== District 35 ====
The new 35th District includes most of Union County and a small portion of southeastern Cabarrus County. Incumbent Republican Todd Johnson had represented the 35th District since 2019.

North Carolina Senate 35th district general election, 2022
Party	Candidate	Votes	%
Republican	Todd Johnson (incumbent)	58,501	100%
Total votes		58,501	100%
Republican hold			

==== District 36 ====
The new 36th District includes all of Alexander, Wilkes, Surry, and Yadkin counties. The district had no incumbent. Eddie Settle won the Republican nomination defeating former state senator Shirley Randleman, State Representative Lee Zachary, and Vann Tate.

North Carolina Senate 36th district Republican primary election, 2022
Party	Candidate	Votes	%
Republican	Eddie Settle	10,756	37.23%
Republican	Shirley Randleman	9,228	31.94%
Republican	Lee Zachary	5,053	17.49%
Republican	Vann Tate	3,852	13.33%
Total votes		28,889	100%

North Carolina Senate 36th district general election, 2022
Party	Candidate	Votes	%
Republican	Eddie Settle	65,973	100%
Total votes		65,973	100%
Republican win (new seat)			

==== District 37 ====
The new 37th District includes all of Iredell County as well as a small portion of far northwestern Mecklenburg County. The district includes the home of incumbent Republican Vickie Sawyer, who had represented the 34th District since 2019. She ran for re-election. Tom Fyler unsuccessfully challenged Sawyer for the Republican nomination.

North Carolina Senate 37th district Republican primary election, 2022
Party	Candidate	Votes	%
Republican	Vickie Sawyer (incumbent)	15,969	82.40%
Republican	Tom Fyler	3,411	17.60%
Total votes		19,380	100%

North Carolina Senate 37th district general election, 2022
Party	Candidate	Votes	%
Republican	Vickie Sawyer (incumbent)	63,763	100%
Total votes		63,763	100%
Republican hold			

==== District 38 ====
The new 38th District includes portions of eastern Mecklenburg County. Incumbent Democrat Mujtaba Mohammed had represented the 38th District since 2019.

North Carolina Senate 38th district general election, 2022
Party	Candidate	Votes	%
Democratic	Mujtaba Mohammed (incumbent)	53,072	100%
Total votes		53,072	100%
Democratic hold			

==== District 39 ====
The new 39th District includes portions of southwestern Mecklenburg County. Incumbent Democrat DeAndrea Salvador had represented the 39th District since 2021.

North Carolina Senate 39th district general election, 2022
Party	Candidate	Votes	%
Democratic	DeAndrea Salvador (incumbent)	47,284	63.86%
Republican	Mark Robeson	26,760	36.14%
Total votes		74,044	100%
Democratic hold			

==== District 40 ====
The new 40th District includes a portion of eastern Mecklenburg County. Incumbent Democrat Joyce Waddell had represented the 40th District since 2015.

North Carolina Senate 40th district general election, 2022
Party	Candidate	Votes	%
Democratic	Joyce Waddell (incumbent)	36,799	67.21%
Republican	Bobbie Shields	17,954	32.79%
Total votes		54,753	100%
Democratic hold			

==== District 41 ====
The new 41st District includes portions of northern and western Mecklenburg County. Incumbent Democrat Natasha Marcus had represented the 41st District since 2019.

North Carolina Senate 41st district general election, 2022
Party	Candidate	Votes	%
Democratic	Natasha Marcus (incumbent)	46,358	66.52%
Republican	Bonni Leone	23,331	33.48%
Total votes		69,689	100%
Democratic hold			

==== District 42 ====
The new 42nd District includes portions of southeastern Mecklenburg County. The district includes the home of incumbent Democrat Jeff Jackson, who had represented the 37th District since 2014. Jackson retired to run for Congress. State Representative Rachel Hunt was unopposed for the Democratic nomination. Cheryl Russo won the Republican nomination, defeating former state Representative Scott Stone.

North Carolina Senate 42nd district Republican primary election, 2022
Party	Candidate	Votes	%
Republican	Cheryl Russo	6,775	50.51%
Republican	Scott Stone	6,638	49.49%
Total votes		13,413	100%

North Carolina Senate 42nd district general election, 2022
Party	Candidate	Votes	%
Democratic	Rachel Hunt	47,621	54.96%
Republican	Cheryl Russo	39,024	45.04%
Total votes		86,645	100%
Democratic hold			

==== District 43 ====
The new 43rd District includes most of Gaston County. Incumbent Republican Majority Leader Kathy Harrington had represented the 43rd District since 2011. She did not seek re-election.

North Carolina Senate 43rd district general election, 2022
Party	Candidate	Votes	%
Republican	Brad Overcash	48,218	100%
Total votes		48,218	100%
Republican hold			

==== District 44 ====
The new 44th District includes all of Cleveland and Lincoln counties as well as a small portion of Gaston County. Incumbent Republican Ted Alexander had represented the 44th District since 2019.

North Carolina Senate 44th district general election, 2022
Party	Candidate	Votes	%
Republican	Ted Alexander (incumbent)	58,525	100%
Total votes		58,525	100%
Republican hold			

==== District 45 ====
The new 45th District includes all of Catawba County as well as portions of eastern Caldwell County. The district includes the home of incumbent Republican Dean Proctor, who had represented the 42nd District since 2020.

North Carolina Senate 45th district general election, 2022
Party	Candidate	Votes	%
Republican	Dean Proctor (incumbent)	61,327	100%
Total votes		61,327	100%
Republican hold			

==== District 46 ====
The new 46th District includes all of Burke and McDowell counties as well as portions of eastern Buncombe County. Incumbent Republican Warren Daniel had represented the 46th District and its predecessors since 2011. Mark Crawford unsuccessfully challenged Daniel for the Republican nomination.

North Carolina Senate 46th district Republican primary election, 2022
Party	Candidate	Votes	%
Republican	Warren Daniel (incumbent)	12,395	61.28%
Republican	Mark Crawford	7,831	38.72%
Total votes		20,226	100%

North Carolina Senate 46th district general election, 2022
Party	Candidate	Votes	%
Republican	Warren Daniel (incumbent)	47,709	60.25%
Democratic	Billy Martin	31,478	39.75%
Total votes		79,187	100%
Republican hold			

==== District 47 ====
The new 47th District includes all of Alleghany, Ashe, Watauga, Avery, Mitchell, Yancey, and Madison counties, as well as portions of Caldwell and Haywood counties. The new district includes the homes of incumbent Republicans Ralph Hise, who had represented the 47th District since 2011, and Deanna Ballard, who had represented the 45th District since 2016. Hise defeated Ballard to win the Republican nomination.

North Carolina Senate 47th district Republican primary election, 2022
Party	Candidate	Votes	%
Republican	Ralph Hise (incumbent)	13,163	50.70%
Republican	Deanna Ballard (incumbent)	12,801	49.30%
Total votes		25,964	100%

North Carolina Senate 47th district general election, 2022
Party	Candidate	Votes	%
Republican	Ralph Hise (incumbent)	62,436	100%
Total votes		62,436	100%
Republican hold			

==== District 48 ====
The new 48th District includes all of Henderson, Polk, and Rutherford counties. Incumbent Republican Chuck Edwards had represented the 48th District since 2016. Edwards retired to run for congress. State representative Tim Moffitt sought the Republican nomination for the seat. The original Democratic nominee was Stephanie A. Justice; however, she dropped out and was replaced on the ballot by Jay Carey.

North Carolina Senate 48th district general election, 2022
Party	Candidate	Votes	%
Republican	Tim Moffitt	54,223	64.79%
Democratic	Jay Carey	29,466	35.21%
Total votes		83,689	100%
Republican hold			

==== District 49 ====
The new 49th District includes most of Buncombe County. Incumbent Democrat Julie Mayfield had represented the 49th District since 2021. Taylon Breeden and Sandra Kilgore unsuccessfully challenged Mayfield for the Democratic nomination.

North Carolina Senate 49th district Democratic primary election, 2022
Party	Candidate	Votes	%
Democratic	Julie Mayfield (incumbent)	16,055	68.25%
Democratic	Sandra Kilgore	4,869	20.70%
Democratic	Taylon Breeden	2,599	11.05%
Total votes		23,523	100%

North Carolina Senate 49th district general election, 2022
Party	Candidate	Votes	%
Democratic	Julie Mayfield (incumbent)	56,351	65.70%
Republican	John Anderson	29,417	34.30%
Total votes		85,768	100%
Democratic hold			

==== District 50 ====
The new 50th District includes all of Cherokee, Graham, Clay, Macon, Swain, Jackson, and Transylvania counties, as well as most of Haywood County. Incumbent Republican Kevin Corbin had represented the 50th District since 2021. He ran for re-election.

North Carolina Senate 50th district general election, 2022
Party	Candidate	Votes	%
Republican	Kevin Corbin (incumbent)	59,534	66.24%
Democratic	Karen Burnette McCracken	30,347	33.76%
Total votes		89,881	100%
Republican hold			

== See also ==
- List of North Carolina state legislatures

== Notes ==
Partisan clients
