= North Carolina's 25th Senate district =

American legislative district

North Carolina's 25th State Senate district
Senator
Amy Galey; R–Burlington
- Demographics: 63% White; 17% Black; 15% Hispanic; 1% Asian; 3% Multiracial
- Population (2023): 221,006

North Carolina's 25th Senate district is one of 50 districts in the North Carolina Senate. It has been represented by Republican Amy Galey since 2023.

== Geography ==
Since 2023, the district has included all of Alamance County, as well as part of Randolph County. The district overlaps with the 54th, 63rd, 64th, 70th, and 78th state house districts.

== District officeholders ==
Senator	Party	Dates	Notes	Counties
David Hoyle (Dallas)	Democratic	January 1, 1993 – January 1, 2003	Redistricted to the 43rd district.	1993–2003; Parts of Gaston, Lincoln, and Cleveland counties.
Bill Purcell (Laurinburg)	Democratic	January 1, 2003 – January 1, 2013	Redistricted from the 17th district. Retired.	2003–2013; All of Stanly, Anson, Richmond, and Scotland counties.
Gene McLaurin (Rockingham)	Democratic	January 1, 2013 – January 1, 2015	Lost re-election.	2013–2019; All of Stanly, Anson, Richmond, and Scotland counties. Part of Rowan County.
Tom McInnis (Ellerbe)	Republican	January 1, 2015 – January 1, 2023	Redistricted to the 21st district.	2013–2019; All of Stanly, Anson, Richmond, and Scotland counties. Part of Rowan County.
Tom McInnis (Ellerbe)	Republican	January 1, 2015 – January 1, 2023	Redistricted to the 21st district.	2019–2023; All of Anson, Richmond, Moore, and Scotland counties.
Amy Galey (Burlington)	Republican	January 1, 2023 – Present	Redistricted from the 24th district.	2023–Present; All of Alamance County. Part of Randolph County.

== Election results ==
=== 2024 ===
North Carolina Senate 25th district Democratic primary election, 2024
Party	Candidate	Votes	%
Democratic	Donna Vanhook	7,162	76.14%
Democratic	John Coleman	2,244	23.86%
Total votes		9,406	100%

North Carolina Senate 25th district general election, 2024
Party	Candidate	Votes	%
Republican	Amy Galey (incumbent)	67,762	60.25%
Democratic	Donna Vanhook	44,711	39.75%
Total votes		112,473	100%
Republican hold			

=== 2022 ===
North Carolina Senate 25th district general election, 2022
Party	Candidate	Votes	%
Republican	Amy Galey (incumbent)	47,355	62.82%
Democratic	Sean C. Ewing	28,031	37.18%
Total votes		75,386	100%
Republican hold			

=== 2020 ===
North Carolina Senate 25th district general election, 2020
Party	Candidate	Votes	%
Republican	Tom McInnis (incumbent)	60,152	59.15%
Democratic	Helen Probst Mills	41,546	40.85%
Total votes		101,698	100%
Republican hold			

=== 2018 ===
North Carolina Senate 25th district Republican primary election, 2018
Party	Candidate	Votes	%
Republican	Tom McInnis (incumbent))	8,911	60.98%
Republican	Michelle Lexo	5,701	39.02%
Total votes		14,612	100%

North Carolina Senate 25th district general election, 2018
Party	Candidate	Votes	%
Republican	Tom McInnis (incumbent)	41,601	57.09%
Democratic	Helen Probst Mills	31,268	42.91%
Total votes		72,869	100%
Republican hold			

=== 2016 ===
North Carolina Senate 25th district general election, 2016
Party	Candidate	Votes	%
Republican	Tom McInnis (incumbent)	53,621	63.81%
Democratic	Dannie M. Montgomery	30,416	36.19%
Total votes		84,037	100%
Republican hold			

=== 2014 ===
North Carolina Senate 25th district general election, 2014
Party	Candidate	Votes	%
Republican	Tom McInnis	28,496	50.40%
Democratic	Gene McLaurin (incumbent)	26,632	47.10%
Libertarian	P.H. Dawkins	1,412	2.50%
Total votes		56,540	100%
Republican gain from Democratic			

=== 2012 ===
North Carolina Senate 25th district Democratic primary election, 2012
Party	Candidate	Votes	%
Democratic	Gene McLaurin	15,532	73.95%
Democratic	Daniel Wilson	5,471	26.05%
Total votes		21,003	100%

North Carolina Senate 25th district Republican primary election, 2012
Party	Candidate	Votes	%
Republican	Gene McIntyre	11,680	72.56%
Republican	Jack T. Benoy	4,417	27.44%
Total votes		16,097	100%

North Carolina Senate 25th district general election, 2012
Party	Candidate	Votes	%
Democratic	Gene McLaurin	44,560	53.01%
Republican	Gene McIntyre	39,506	46.99%
Total votes		84,066	100%
Democratic hold			

=== 2010 ===
North Carolina Senate 25th district general election, 2010
Party	Candidate	Votes	%
Democratic	Bill Purcell (incumbent)	23,363	51.25%
Republican	P. Jason Phibbs	22,219	48.75%
Total votes		45,582	100%
Democratic hold			

=== 2008 ===
North Carolina Senate 25th district Democratic primary election, 2008
Party	Candidate	Votes	%
Democratic	Bill Purcell (incumbent)	18,206	64.09%
Democratic	Betty Blue Gholston	10,203	35.91%
Total votes		28,409	100%

North Carolina Senate 25th district general election, 2008
Party	Candidate	Votes	%
Democratic	Bill Purcell (incumbent)	42,760	60.84%
Republican	Janice B. Abernathy	27,519	39.16%
Total votes		70,279	100%
Democratic hold			

=== 2006 ===
North Carolina Senate 25th district general election, 2006
Party	Candidate	Votes	%
Democratic	Bill Purcell (incumbent)	23,436	63.21%
Republican	Douglas Bowen	13,640	37.79%
Total votes		37,076	100%
Democratic hold			

=== 2004 ===
North Carolina Senate 25th district general election, 2004
Party	Candidate	Votes	%
Democratic	Bill Purcell (incumbent)	37,319	81.53%
Independent	Jerry Lineau Gattis (write-in)	8,457	18.47%
Total votes		45,776	100%
Democratic hold			

=== 2002 ===
North Carolina Senate 25th district general election, 2002
Party	Candidate	Votes	%
Democratic	Bill Purcell (incumbent)	24,178	57.63%
Republican	Donald M. Dawkins	17,778	42.37%
Total votes		41,956	100%
Democratic hold			

=== 2000 ===
North Carolina Senate 25th district general election, 2000
Party	Candidate	Votes	%
Democratic	David Hoyle (incumbent)	29,337	100%
Total votes		29,337	100%
Democratic hold			
