= David Hoyle =

David Hoyle may refer to:

- David Hoyle (performance artist) (born 1962), British performance artist, actor and comedian often performing as his character The Divine David
- David Hoyle (priest) (born 1957), Dean of Westminster
- David W. Hoyle (1939–2023), North Carolina politician
