= Grafstein =

Grafstein is a surname. Notable people with the surname include:

- Jerry Grafstein (born 1935), Canadian lawyer, businessman, and politician
- Lisa Grafstein, American lawyer and politician
