= Michael P. Walters =

American businessman and politician from North Carolina

Senator Michael Walters
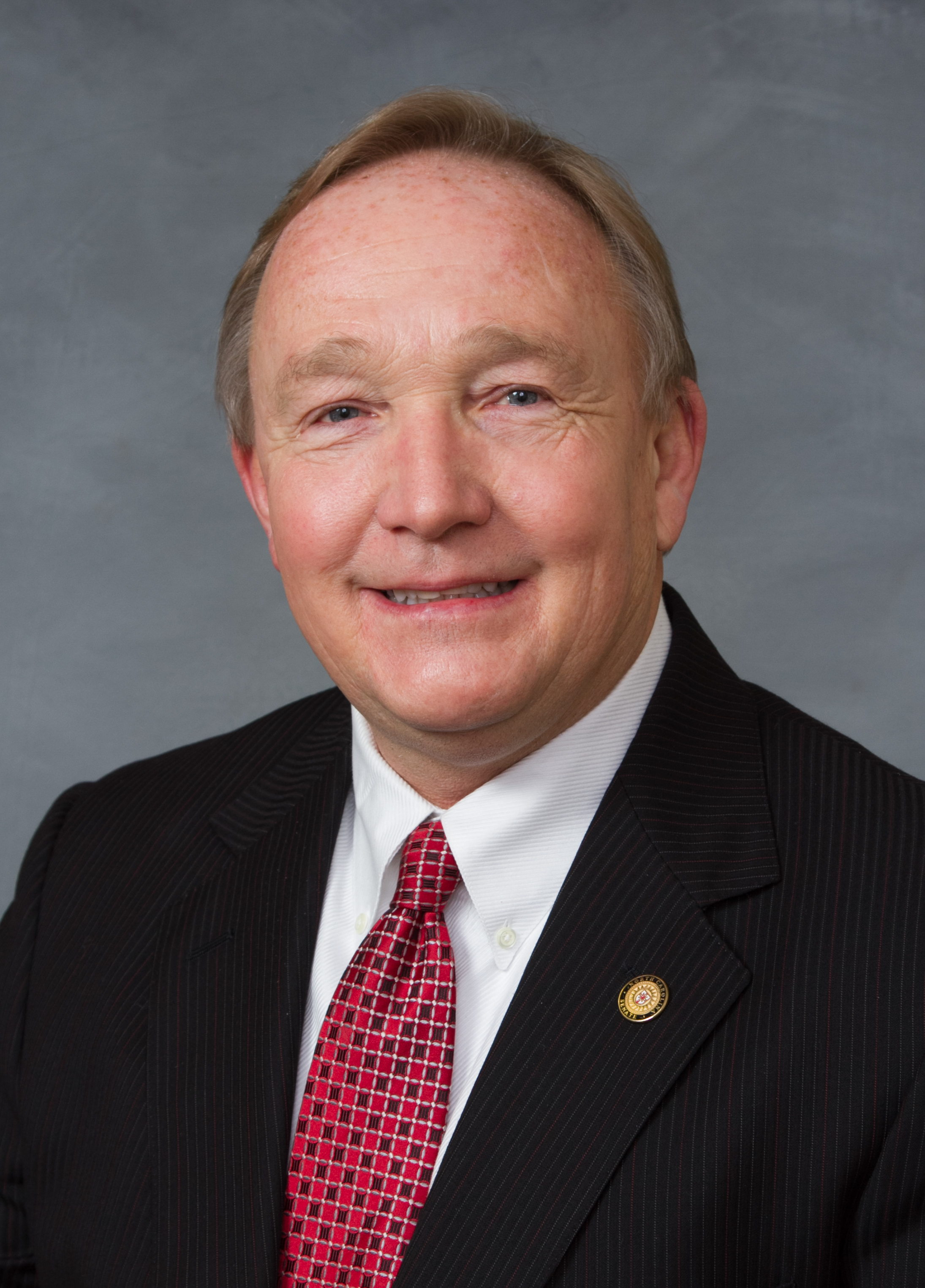

Member of the North Carolina Senate from the 13th district
- In office November 3, 2009 – January 1, 2015
- Preceded by: David Weinstein
- Succeeded by: Jane Smith

Personal details
- Born: July 16, 1956 (age 70)
- Party: Democratic
- Education: North Carolina State University
- Occupation: businessman, logging company

Michael P. Walters (born July 16, 1956) is a North Carolina businessman and politician. He was appointed to a seat in the North Carolina Senate in 2009 to fill the vacancy caused by the resignation of Sen. David Weinstein (a fellow Democrat), and then was elected and re-elected to the Senate in 2010 and 2012. He chose not to run for another term in 2014. Walters has represented Senate District 13, including Columbus, Robeson and Hoke counties.

== Committee assignments ==
=== 2013-2014 session ===
- Appropriations - Natural and Economic Resources
- Agriculture/Environment/Natural Resources
- Finance
- Insurance
- Pensions, Retirement, and Aging
- State and Local Government
- Transportation

=== 2011-2012 session ===
- Appropriations/Base Budget
- Agriculture/Environment/Natural Resources
- Finance
- Insurance
- Judiciary I
- Pensions, Retirement, and Aging
- State and Local Government
- Redistricting

== Electoral history ==
=== 2012 ===
North Carolina Senate 13th district general election, 2012
Party	Candidate	Votes	%
Democratic	Michael Walters (incumbent)	46,974	72.55%
Republican	W. Bernard White Jr.	17,770	27.45%
Total votes		64,744	100%
Democratic hold			

=== 2010 ===
North Carolina Senate 13th district Democratic primary election, 2010
Party	Candidate	Votes	%
Democratic	Michael Walters (incumbent)	13,559	68.87%
Democratic	Ben Clark	6,129	31.13%
Total votes		19,688	100%

North Carolina Senate 13th district general election, 2010
Party	Candidate	Votes	%
Democratic	Michael Walters (incumbent)	22,728	100%
Total votes		22,728	100%
Democratic hold			

North Carolina Senate
Preceded by David Weinstein	Member of the North Carolina Senate from the 13th district 2009-2015	Succeeded by Jane Smith
