= David F. Weinstein =

American politician

David Franklin Weinstein (born June 17, 1936) is a politician in North Carolina. He served as Democratic member of the General Assembly who represented the state's thirteenth Senate district, including Hoke and Robeson counties.

== Early life ==
He was born in Charlotte, North Carolina. He is Jewish.

== Career ==
He worked as a merchant from Lumberton, North Carolina. After retiring he served as Mayor of Lumberton, NC from 1988–1992. Weinstein joined the Board of Trustees for University of North Carolina at Pembroke in 1992 and served two years as chairman. He served until his election to the General Assembly in 1997.

He served in the Senate from 1997 through 2009, when Governor Beverly Perdue appointed him to head the Governor's Highway Safety Program. He was replaced in the Senate by Michael P. Walters.

During his 13 years as a senator, Weinstein guided some $92 million to UNC Pembroke for building projects, including $29 million for the Health Sciences Building. In May 2018, the building was named the David F. Weinstein Health Sciences Building. Senator Weinstein was instrumental in a 6.9 million special appropriation to build the first new residence hall at the university in 25 years. From a successful $2 billion bond referendum, he carved out $57 million for the university.

Weinstein was instrumental in changing the name of the university, which helped boost enrollment. At the naming ceremony, Weinstein stated that the building was his greatest accomplishment as legislator. "I continue to believe that UNCP is the jewel in the crown of southeastern North Carolina," he said. UNCP Chancellor Robin Gary Cummings stated that "Senator Weinstein has been a monumental game changer for this university. David Weinstein recognized the need for trained health care and professionals in the region. When he went to Raleigh, he went to work for us," Cummings said, "the result is this building which is the largest construction project in university history."

North Carolina Senate
Preceded by David Russell Parnell	Member of the North Carolina Senate from the 30th district 1997–2003	Succeeded by John Garwood
Preceded by Wib Gulley; Jeanne Hopkins Lucas	Member of the North Carolina Senate from the 13th district 2003–2009	Succeeded by Michael Walters
