= Lisa Grafstein =

American lawyer and politician

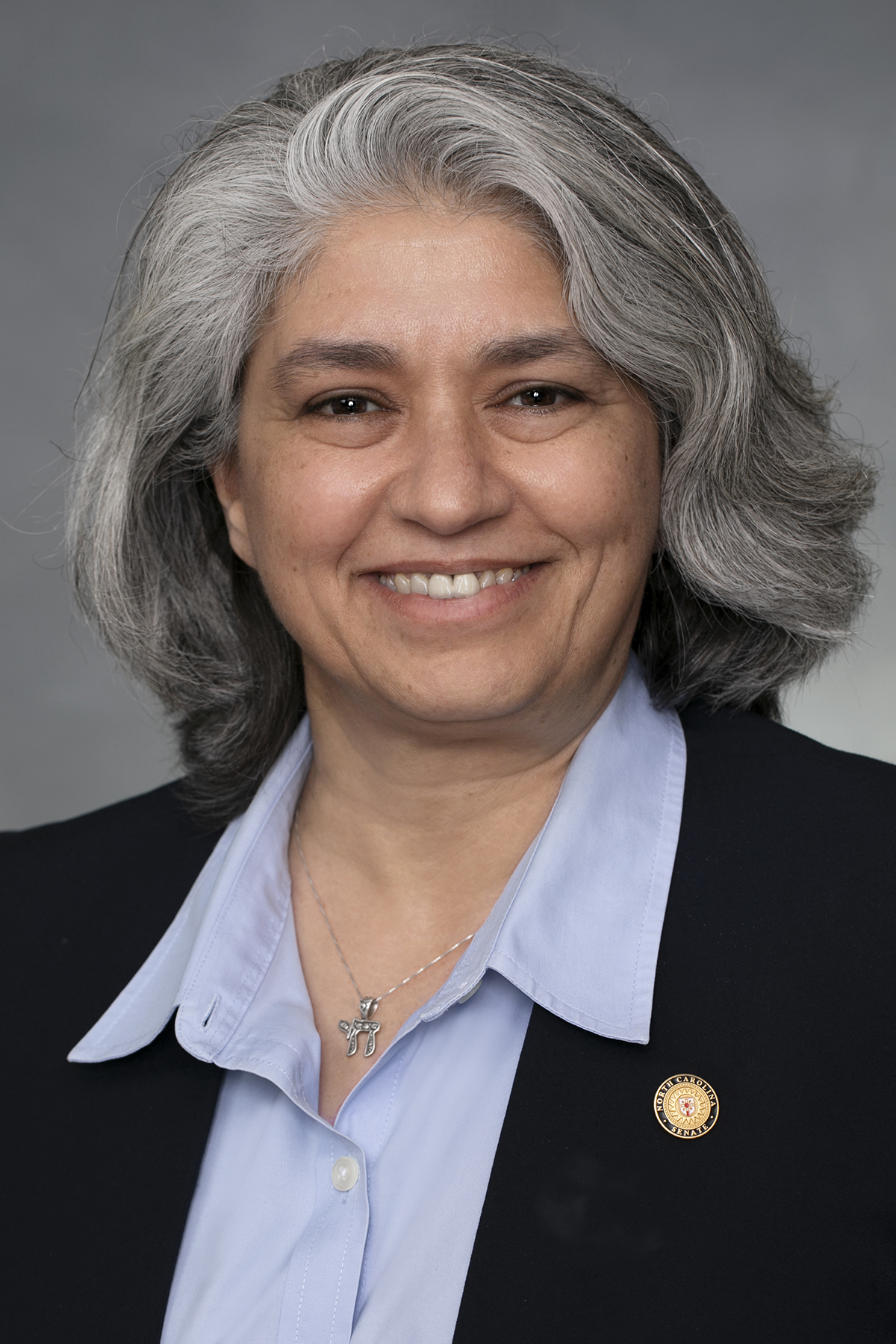

Member of the North Carolina Senate from the 13th district
- Incumbent
- Assumed office January 1, 2023
- Preceded by: Constituency established

Personal details
- Born: September 7, 1966 (age 60)
- Party: Democratic
- Education: Northwestern University (BA); University of North Carolina School of Law (JD)

Lisa Grafstein (born 1966) is an American lawyer and politician serving as a member of the North Carolina Senate from the 13th district since 2023. She is a civil rights attorney specializing in employment law. She was the litigation counsel of Disability Rights North Carolina.

== Life ==
Grafstein was born in 1966. She earned a B.A. in English from Northwestern University. In 1993, while completing law school, Grafstein spoke in support of gay rights. She completed a J.D. from University of North Carolina School of Law.

Grafstein is a civil rights attorney from Raleigh, North Carolina. She specializes in employment law. In 2022, she was working as the litigation counsel of a nonprofit organization, Disability Rights North Carolina.

A Democrat, Grafstein ran successfully in the 2022 North Carolina Senate election for the 13th district. She defeated city council member Patrick Buffkin in the primary election and retired engineer David Bankert and political scientist Michael Munger in the general election. On March 7, 2023, she introduced Bill 225 aimed at permitting North Carolina municipalities to enact rent regulation. In June 2023, she expressed skepticism over a proposal to introduce a photo ID requirement for all voters including by mail. She also worried about the potential impacts of a fast-moving bill to legalize video sports gambling. In July 2023, she opposed the Republican-led ban on gender-affirming care. As of 2023, she is the only out LGBTQ North Carolina state senator.

== Electoral history ==
North Carolina Senate 13th district Democratic primary election, 2022
Party	Candidate	Votes	%
Democratic	Lisa Grafstein	11,931	66.59%
Democratic	Patrick Buffkin	5,987	33.41%
Total votes		17,918	100%

North Carolina Senate 13th district general election, 2022
Party	Candidate	Votes	%
Democratic	Lisa Grafstein	50,937	62.34%
Republican	David Bankert	28,001	34.27%
Libertarian	Michael Munger	2,769	3.39%
Total votes		81,707	100%
Democratic win (new seat)			

North Carolina Senate 13th district general election, 2024
Party	Candidate	Votes	%
Democratic	Lisa Grafstein	64,074	50.21%
Republican	Scott Lassiter	59,829	46.89%
Libertarian	Susan Hogarth	3,700	2.90%
Total votes		127,603	100%

North Carolina Senate
Preceded by Danny Britt	Member of the North Carolina Senate from the 13th district 2023–present	Incumbent
