= Anthony Foriest =

American politician from North Carolina

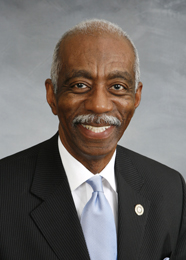

Member of the North Carolina Senate from the 24th district
- In office January 1, 2007 – January 1, 2011
- Preceded by: Hugh Webster
- Succeeded by: Rick Gunn

Personal details
- Party: Democratic
- Spouse: Clara Foriest
- Education: University of North Carolina, Chapel Hill (BA); Elon University (MBA)
- Occupation: Businessman

Anthony "Tony" Emanuel Foriest is an American politician who served two terms as a Democratic member of the North Carolina Senate for the 24th district.

== Early life, education, and early career ==
Foriest was born in Ahoskie N.C. and raised in Alamance County. He was a member of the United States Army for three years then attended The University of North Carolina where he attained a bachelor's degree. He later attended Elon University and earned a master's degree.

He worked for the Xerox Corporation for 24 years in a number of management positions.

== Political career ==
Foriest has been actively involved with the Democratic Party over a number of years, including, " ... [the] North Carolina Democratic Party .. served as chairman of the N.C. Senior Democrats, was a member of the N.C. Democratic Party executive committee and spent two terms as chairman of the Alamance County Democratic Party.

During his time in office he voted for the North Carolina 2009 Racial Justice Act which opposed the imposition of the death penalty on the basis of race. In 2012 the law was rolled back.

== Life after politics ==
Foriest is retired and has continued his interest in improving race relations. In 2015 he took part in a Community Connections forum at Elon University'

His advice was, “Read. Study. Get involved. And challenge the status quo.”

Most people find it very, very difficult to even talk about race, much less trying to solve some of the problems ... You have to understand it takes a tremendous amount of effort if we’re going to dispel some of the myths that have been perpetuated for several hundred years. People have to understand when you talk about race, it brings up some raw emotions because you’re dispelling things you have been taught, you have seen, you have learned to live with over the years.

The forum was so well attended that extra seating was brought in.

He has become involved in helping the community with his membership of boards and charitable organizations.

== Personal life ==
Foriest is married to Clara Foriest, a member of the Board of Visitors at Elon University, He has two children, Pamela and Bryant, 3 grandsons Trey, Blake, and Alex, and 2 granddaughters, Christina, and Addison. He lives in Graham, NC.

== North Carolina Senate ==
=== Elections ===
2004 Challenged incumbent Republican State Senator Hugh Webster and lost 58%-42%.

2006 Filed for rematch against Webster and defeated him 51%-49%, a difference of just 460 votes.

2008 Won re-election to a second term defeating Republican Richard Gunn 53%-47%.

2010 Gunn filed for a rematch and defeated Foriest 53%-42%.

=== Committee assignments ===
- Appropriations/Base Budget Committee (Co-chairman)
- Commerce Committee
- Education Committee (Vice Chairman)
- Finance Committee
- Health Care Committee (Vice-chairman)
- Pensions, Retirement, & Aging Committee (chairman)

== 2012 congressional election ==
In March 2012, Foriest filed to run in the newly redrawn North Carolina's 6th congressional district, held by Republican U.S. Congressman Howard Coble. Foriest was unopposed in the primary and was the Democratic nominee. He was defeated by Coble who obtained 61% of the vote to 39% to Foriest.

== Religious, Civic and other Memberships ==
All entries without a citation

Former Board Member, Alamance County Arts Council

Former Board Member, Alamance County Citizens for Education

Former Board Member, Alamance County Friendship Center

Executive Committee, Alamance Achieves

Board Member ACAC (Allied Churches of Alamance County)

Board Member, Cone Health Alamance Regional Charitable Foundation

Advisory Member, American National Bank

Member, Board of Deacons, First Baptist Church

Former Board Member, Democracy North Carolina

Advisory Member, Elon Board of Visitors

Member, First Baptist Church

Former Board Member, National Association for the Advancement of Colored People (NAACP)

Former Chair, North Carolina Senior Democrats

Former Board Member, United Way of Alamance County

North Carolina Senate
Preceded by Hugh Webster	Member of the North Carolina Senate from the 24th district 2007–2011	Succeeded by Rick Gunn
