= Gene McLaurin =

American politician from North Carolina

Senator Gene McLaurin

Member of the North Carolina Senate from the 25th district
- In office January 1, 2013 – January 1, 2015
- Preceded by: Bill Purcell
- Succeeded by: Tom McInnis

Personal details
- Party: Democratic
- Spouse: Donna
- Education: University of North Carolina at Charlotte
- Occupation: President of Swink-Quality Oil
- Website: Campaign website

Gene McLaurin was a Democratic member of the North Carolina Senate, representing the 25th district. McLaurin served on the Commerce, Agriculture/Environment/Natural Resources, Appropriations on Natural and Economic Resources, Finance, Insurance, Pensions & Retirement and Aging, and State and Local Government committees. Before being elected to the North Carolina Senate in 2012, McLaurin served as the mayor of Rockingham, North Carolina from 1997 to 2012. McLaurin considers himself to be moderate to conservative in his political views, counting Jim Hunt, Ronald Reagan, and Terry Sanford among his political heroes. In addition to his political career, McLaurin has also worked as the general manager of TOTAL Lubricants and the president of Swink-Quality Oil Company.

== Electoral history ==
Mayor of Rockingham (2009):

 Gene McLaurin: 1,408
Bruce Stanback: 364
      Write-In: 13

Mayor of Rockingham (2011):

 Gene McLaurin: 858
      Write-In: 13

NC State Senate District 25 (2012):

 Gene McLaurin (D): 44,560
 Gene McIntyre (R): 39,506

NC State Senate District 25 (2014):

   Tom McInnis (R): 28,496
 Gene McLaurin (D): 26,632
   P.H Dawkins (L): 1,412

== Political future ==
Gene has openly stated he is open to running for political office again in 2016 after his 2014 defeat. This has led to speculations about what he may intend on running for. Many believe he should run for his old state senate or run for a state house seat. Others have urged the former state senator to run for higher office either for Congress or at the state level.

North Carolina Senate
| Preceded by Bill Purcell | Member of the North Carolina Senate from the 25th district 2013-2015 | Succeeded by Tom McInnis |
