= Hugh Webster (politician) =

American politician (1943–2022)

Member of the North Carolina Senate from the 21st district
- In office 1995–2003

Member of the North Carolina Senate from the 24th district
- In office 2003–2007

Personal details
- Born: August 6, 1943 Caswell County, North Carolina, U.S.
- Died: March 4, 2022 (aged 78) Burlington, North Carolina, U.S.
- Party: Republican
- Spouse: Patricia "Pat" Webster
- Children: 2
- Education: University of North Carolina at Chapel Hill

Hugh B. Webster (August 6, 1943 – March 4, 2022) was an accountant, farmer, register of deeds and North Carolina state senator from Caswell County, North Carolina. As a state senator, he represented North Carolina's 21st Senate district from 1995-2003 and North Carolina's 24th Senate district from 2003 to 2007, which included constituents in Alamance, Caswell and parts of Person counties.

== Biography ==
=== Personal life and political career ===
In 1961, Hugh Webster graduated from Bartlett Yancey High School in Yanceyville, North Carolina. He joined the US Army, serving two years before attending the University of North Carolina at Chapel Hill, where he received a Bachelor of Science in 1968 and a Specialty in Accounting graduate certificate in 1969.

After passing the CPA exam in 1969, Webster was an auditor and tax specialist for major accounting firms in the U.S., Latin America, and South Africa. He also did contract audit work for the U.S. Departments of Defense and Labor in the U.S. and in Germany.

Webster worked for 30 years as a self-employed accountant in Yanceyville, offering tax preparation and small business services. In addition, he was a farmer who raised tobacco, grain, and cattle.

In 1995, he became a North Carolina state senator after defeating George Daniel, an eight-year incumbent Democrat. Webster was the first Republican from Caswell County elected to the state senate since John W. Stephens in 1868. (Stephens' assassination in 1870 helped trigger the Kirk–Holden War).

He served six terms as a state senator until narrowly losing his re-election bid by 460 votes to Democrat Tony Foriest on November 7, 2006.

During his 12 years in the North Carolina General Assembly, he served on various committees, including finance and appropriations, environment and natural resources, and agriculture. He also worked on several bills affecting state taxes.

Webster notably sponsored a bill called "The Baby Greer Act," which would have allowed prosecutors to charge those accused of murdering pregnant women with double homicide. A similar bill called the Unborn Victims of Violence Act or Ethen's Law was later passed by the state legislature in 2011.

In 2008, he challenged U.S. Rep. Brad Miller to represent North Carolina's 13th congressional district. His campaign issues included immigration, reducing federal spending, and protecting constitutional rights such as free speech and gun ownership. Webster was defeated by Miller, with the incumbent receiving nearly 66 percent of the district vote.

In November 2008, Webster was indicted on a felony embezzlement charge. He was acquitted by a jury in 2009.

In 2011, he was appointed register of deeds for Alamance County, North Carolina and was re-elected twice until stepping down in 2021.

Webster and his wife, Patricia, had two children, LeGrand and Noel. In 2021, he and his wife separated.

Following a period of declining health, Webster died in Burlington, North Carolina, on March 4, 2022.

North Carolina Senate
Preceded by George Berkley Daniel	Member of the North Carolina Senate from the 21st district 1995–2003	Succeeded by Larry Shaw
Preceded by Tony Rand	Member of the North Carolina Senate from the 24th district 2003–2007	Succeeded by Tony Foriest
