= North Carolina's 13th Senate district =

American legislative district

North Carolina's 13th State Senate district
Senator
Lisa Grafstein; D–Raleigh
- Demographics: 61% White; 18% Black; 13% Hispanic; 4% Asian; 3% Multiracial
- Population (2023): 196,819

North Carolina's 13th Senate district is one of 50 districts in the North Carolina Senate. It has been represented by Democrat Lisa Grafstein since 2023.

== Geography ==
Since 2023, the district has included part of Wake County. The district overlaps with the 11th, 21st, 33rd, 36th, 37th, and 39th state house districts.

== District officeholders ==
=== Multi-member district ===
Senator	Party	Dates	Notes	Senator	Party	Dates	Notes	Counties
Kenneth Royall Jr. (Durham)	Democratic	January 1, 1973 – January 1, 1993	Retired.	Gordon Allen (Roxboro)	Democratic	January 1, 1973 – January 1, 1975	Redistricted from the 11th district. Retired.	1973–1983; All of Durham, Person, and Granville Counties.
Kenneth Royall Jr. (Durham)	Democratic	January 1, 1973 – January 1, 1993	Retired.	Willis Whichard (Durham)	Democratic	January 1, 1975 – September 2, 1980	Resigned to become North Carolina Court of Appeals judge.	1973–1983; All of Durham, Person, and Granville Counties.
Kenneth Royall Jr. (Durham)	Democratic	January 1, 1973 – January 1, 1993	Retired.	Vacant		September 2, 1980 – October 6, 1980		1973–1983; All of Durham, Person, and Granville Counties.
Kenneth Royall Jr. (Durham)	Democratic	January 1, 1973 – January 1, 1993	Retired.	William Hancock Jr. (Durham)	Democratic	October 6, 1980 – January 1, 1985	Appointed to finish Wichard's term.	1973–1983; All of Durham, Person, and Granville Counties.
Kenneth Royall Jr. (Durham)	Democratic	January 1, 1973 – January 1, 1993	Retired.	William Hancock Jr. (Durham)	Democratic	October 6, 1980 – January 1, 1985	Appointed to finish Wichard's term.	1983–1993; All of Durham, Person, and Granville Counties. Part of Orange County.
Kenneth Royall Jr. (Durham)	Democratic	January 1, 1973 – January 1, 1993	Retired.	Ralph Hunt (Durham)	Democratic	January 1, 1985 – July 24, 1993	Resigned.	1983–1993; All of Durham, Person, and Granville Counties. Part of Orange County.
Wib Gulley (Durham)	Democratic	January 1, 1993 – January 1, 2003	Redistricted to the 18th district.	Ralph Hunt (Durham)	Democratic	January 1, 1985 – July 24, 1993	Resigned.	1993–2003; All of Durham County. Parts of Person, Granville, and Wake counties.
Wib Gulley (Durham)	Democratic	January 1, 1993 – January 1, 2003	Redistricted to the 18th district.	Vacant		July 24, 1993 – August 3, 1993		1993–2003; All of Durham County. Parts of Person, Granville, and Wake counties.
Wib Gulley (Durham)	Democratic	January 1, 1993 – January 1, 2003	Redistricted to the 18th district.	Jeanne Hopkins Lucas (Durham)	Democratic	August 3, 1993 – January 1, 2003	Appointed to finish Hunt's term. Redistricted to the 20th district.	1993–2003; All of Durham County. Parts of Person, Granville, and Wake counties.

=== Single-member district ===
Senator	Party	Dates	Notes	Counties
David Weinstein (Lumberton)	Democratic	January 1, 2003 – September 30, 2009	Redistricted from the 30th district. Resigned.	2003–2013; All of Robeson and Hoke counties.
Vacant		September 30, 2009 – November 3, 2009		2003–2013; All of Robeson and Hoke counties.
Michael Walters (Fairmont)	Democratic	November 3, 2009 – January 1, 2015	Appointed to finish Weinstein's term. Retired.	2003–2013; All of Robeson and Hoke counties.
Michael Walters (Fairmont)	Democratic	November 3, 2009 – January 1, 2015	Appointed to finish Weinstein's term. Retired.	2013–2023; All of Robeson and Columbus counties.
Jane W. Smith (Lumberton)	Democratic	January 1, 2015 – January 1, 2017	Lost re-election.	2013–2023; All of Robeson and Columbus counties.
Danny Britt (Lumberton)	Republican	January 1, 2017 – January 1, 2023	Redistricted to the 24th district.	2013–2023; All of Robeson and Columbus counties.
Lisa Grafstein (Raleigh)	Democratic	January 1, 2023 – Present		2023–Present; Part of Wake County.

== Election results ==
=== 2024 ===
North Carolina Senate 13th district Republican primary election, 2024
Party	Candidate	Votes	%
Republican	Scott Lassiter	11,636	52.94%
Republican	Vicki Harry	10,345	47.06%
Total votes		21,981	100%

North Carolina Senate 13th district general election, 2024
Party	Candidate	Votes	%
Democratic	Lisa Grafstein (incumbent)	64,074	50.21%
Republican	Scott Lassiter	59,829	46.89%
Libertarian	Susan Hogarth	3,700	2.90%
Total votes		127,603	100%
Democratic hold			

=== 2022 ===
North Carolina Senate 13th district Democratic primary election, 2022
Party	Candidate	Votes	%
Democratic	Lisa Grafstein	11,931	66.59%
Democratic	Patrick Buffkin	5,987	33.41%
Total votes		17,918	100%

North Carolina Senate 13th district Republican primary election, 2022
Party	Candidate	Votes	%
Republican	David Bankert	5,230	52.23%
Republican	Jeff Werner	4,783	47.77%
Total votes		10,013	100%

North Carolina Senate 13th district general election, 2022
Party	Candidate	Votes	%
Democratic	Lisa Grafstein	50,937	62.34%
Republican	David Bankert	28,001	34.27%
Libertarian	Michael Munger	2,769	3.39%
Total votes		81,707	100%
Democratic win (new seat)			

=== 2020 ===
North Carolina Senate 13th district general election, 2020
Party	Candidate	Votes	%
Republican	Danny Britt (incumbent)	45,264	63.56%
Democratic	Barbara Yates-Lockamy	25,949	36.44%
Total votes		71,213	100%
Republican hold			

=== 2018 ===
North Carolina Senate 13th district Democratic primary election, 2018
Party	Candidate	Votes	%
Democratic	John Campbell	14,803	69.20%
Democratic	Bobbie Jacobs-Ghaffar	6,588	30.80%
Total votes		21,391	100%

North Carolina Senate 13th district general election, 2018
Party	Candidate	Votes	%
Republican	Danny Britt (incumbent)	31,106	62.50%
Democratic	John Campbell	18,661	37.50%
Total votes		49,767	100%
Republican hold			

=== 2016 ===
North Carolina Senate 13th district general election, 2016
Party	Candidate	Votes	%
Republican	Danny Britt	34,126	54.98%
Democratic	Jane Smith (incumbent)	27,940	45.02%
Total votes		62,066	100%
Republican gain from Democratic			

=== 2014 ===
North Carolina Senate 13th district Democratic primary election, 2014
Party	Candidate	Votes	%
Democratic	Jane Smith	9,510	47.32%
Democratic	Marcus W. Williams	5,496	27.34%
Democratic	David Ayers	2,735	13.61%
Democratic	Beverly Collins Hall	2,358	11.73%
Total votes		20,099	100%

North Carolina Senate 13th district general election, 2014
Party	Candidate	Votes	%
Democratic	Jane Smith	24,076	62.78%
Republican	Bernard White	14,276	37.22%
Total votes		38,352	100%
Democratic hold			

=== 2012 ===
North Carolina Senate 13th district general election, 2012
Party	Candidate	Votes	%
Democratic	Michael Walters (incumbent)	46,974	72.55%
Republican	W. Bernard White Jr.	17,770	27.45%
Total votes		64,744	100%
Democratic hold			

=== 2010 ===
North Carolina Senate 13th district Democratic primary election, 2010
Party	Candidate	Votes	%
Democratic	Michael Walters (incumbent)	13,559	68.87%
Democratic	Ben Clark	6,129	31.13%
Total votes		19,688	100%

North Carolina Senate 13th district general election, 2010
Party	Candidate	Votes	%
Democratic	Michael Walters (incumbent)	22,728	100%
Total votes		22,728	100%
Democratic hold			

=== 2008 ===
North Carolina Senate 13th district Democratic primary election, 2008
Party	Candidate	Votes	%
Democratic	David Weinstein (incumbent)	17,477	61.17%
Democratic	Ben Clark	11,095	38.83%
Total votes		28,572	100%

North Carolina Senate 13th district general election, 2008
Party	Candidate	Votes	%
Democratic	David Weinstein (incumbent)	45,776	100%
Total votes		45,776	100%
Democratic hold			

=== 2006 ===
North Carolina Senate 13th district Democratic primary election, 2006
Party	Candidate	Votes	%
Democratic	David Weinstein (incumbent)	11,884	65.04%
Democratic	Ben Clark	6,389	34.96%
Total votes		18,273	100%

North Carolina Senate 13th district general election, 2006
Party	Candidate	Votes	%
Democratic	David Weinstein (incumbent)	15,992	100%
Total votes		15,992	100%
Democratic hold			

=== 2004 ===
North Carolina Senate 13th district general election, 2004
Party	Candidate	Votes	%
Democratic	David Weinstein (incumbent)	37,829	100%
Total votes		37,829	100%
Democratic hold			

=== 2002 ===
North Carolina Senate 13th district general election, 2002
Party	Candidate	Votes	%
Democratic	David Weinstein (incumbent)	21,602	100%
Total votes		21,602	100%
Democratic hold			

=== 2000 ===
North Carolina Senate 13th district general election, 2000
Party	Candidate	Votes	%
Democratic	Wib Gulley (incumbent)	82,509	37.54%
Democratic	Jeanne Hopkins Lucas (incumbent)	76,064	34.61%
Republican	Wallace Bradsher	52,113	23.71%
Libertarian	Sean Haugh	9,102	4.14%
Total votes		219,788	100%
Democratic hold			
Democratic hold			
