= Melvin J. Hinich =

- Born: Melvin Jay Hinich; April 29, 1939; Pittsburgh, Pennsylvania, U.S.
- Died: September 6, 2010 (aged 71)

Melvin Jay "Mel" Hinich (April 29, 1939 – September 6, 2010) was a professor of government and economics at the University of Texas at Austin. Hinich was also a research professor at UT's Applied Research Laboratories. Known as an expert in political science with a long record of distinction in a number of fields, he wrote seven books and published more than 200 papers in statistics/statistical theory, signal processing, economics, political science, biomedical engineering, pharmacy, and library science.

== Biography ==
Hinich was born on April 29, 1939, in Pittsburgh, Pennsylvania. In 1966, he married Sonje Gregg and the couple had a daughter, Amy Leksana.

== Education ==
Hinich attended Carnegie Institute of Technology where he earned a B.S. in Mathematics in 1959 as well as an M.S. in Mathematics in 1960. In 1963, he earned a Ph.D. in Statistics from Stanford University. Hinich's advisor while at Stanford was Herman Chernoff.

== Editorial experience and professional affiliations ==
At various times throughout his career, Hinich served as editor for Macroeconomic Dynamics, Society for Nonlinear Dynamics and Econometrics, Journal of the American Statistical Association, and Journal of Mathematical Sociology. He became a fellow of the Institute of Mathematical Statistics in 1973, a fellow of the Public Choice Society in 1988, and was president of that organization from 1992 to 1994. Hinich was elected as a fellow of the American Statistical Association in 2002.

== Academic influence ==
Michael Munger was reported to have been heavily influenced by Hinich.

== Death ==
Hinich died on September 6, 2010, after falling down a staircase. He is survived by his wife and daughter.

== Publications ==
=== Books ===
- The Spatial Theory of Voting: An Introduction (with J. Enelow), Cambridge University Press, January (1984)
- Advances in the Spatial Theory of Voting, J. Enelow and M. J. Hinich (eds.), Cambridge University Press (1990)
- Political Economy: Institutions, Competition, and Representation, W. Barnett, M. J. Hinich, and N. J. Schofield (eds.), Cambridge University Press (1993).
- Ideology and the Theory of Political Choice, (with M. C. Munger), University of Michigan Press, (1994)
- Analytical Politics (with M.C. Munger) Cambridge University Press, (1997). Empirical Studies in Comparative Politics, (with M.C. Munger) Kluwer Academic Publishers,(1999)
- Topics in Analytical Political Economy, M. J. Hinich and W. Barnett (editors), Elsevier, Oxford (ISBN 978-0-444-53137-7) (2007)
- Consumer Protection Legislation and the U. S. Food Industry (with R. Staelin), Pergamon Press, (1980).
- Introduction to Continuous Probability Theory, (with K. D. MacKenzie), Charles E. Merrill Publishing Co., (1969).

=== Articles ===
- Inbody, Donald S.; Hinich, Melvin J. (January 2009). "Randomly Modulated Periodicities in Relative Sunspot Numbers". Texas State University. hdl:10877/3983.
- Dubnov, Shlomo; Hinich, Melvin J. (January 2009). "Analyzing several musical instrument tones using the randomly modulated periodicity model". Signal Processing. 89 (1): 24–30. Bibcode:2009SigPr..89...24D. doi:10.1016/j.sigpro.2008.07.006.
