= Rick Gunn =

American politician from North Carolina

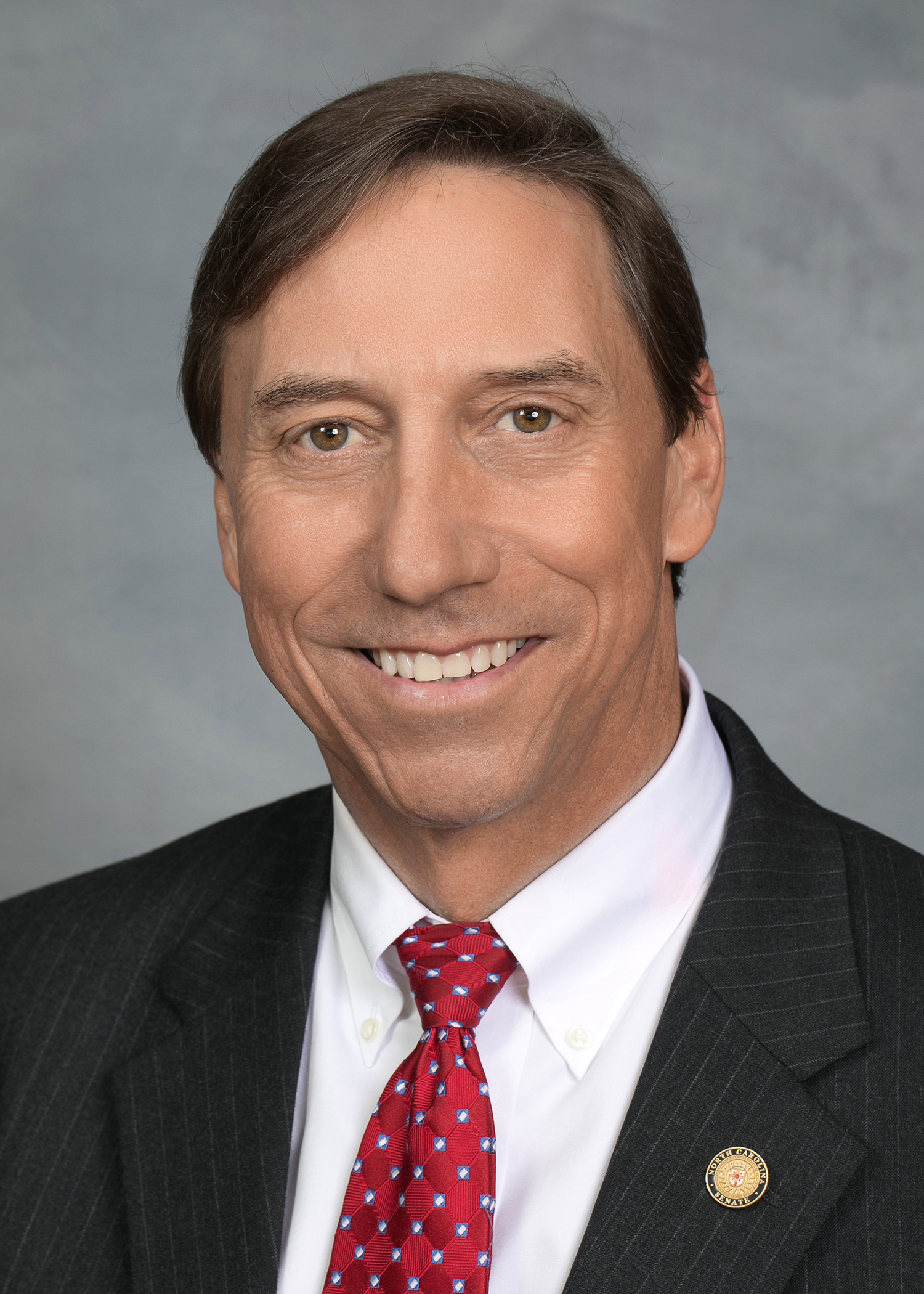

Majority Whip of the North Carolina Senate
- In office January 9, 2019 – January 1, 2021
- Preceded by: Jerry Tillman
- Succeeded by: Jim Perry

Member of the North Carolina Senate from the 24th district
- In office January 1, 2011 – January 1, 2021
- Preceded by: Tony Foriest
- Succeeded by: Amy Galey

Personal details
- Born: March 5, 1958 (age 68) Burlington, North Carolina, U.S.
- Party: Republican
- Education: University of North Carolina, Chapel Hill (BS)

Rick Gunn (born March 5, 1958) is an American politician who served in the North Carolina Senate from the 24th district from 2011 to 2021.

North Carolina Senate
Preceded by Tony Foriest	Member of the North Carolina Senate from the 24th district 2011–2021	Succeeded by Amy Galey
Preceded by Jerry Tillman	Majority Whip of the North Carolina Senate; 2019–2021	Succeeded by Jim Perry
