= Sean C. Ewing =

American politician and engineer

Sean Ewing

Member of the Mebane City Council
- Incumbent
- Assumed office January 1, 2019

Personal details
- Born: Elyria, Ohio
- Party: Democratic
- Occupation: Electrical engineer, politician

Military service
- Branch/service: United States Air Force; Air National Guard
- Years of service: 1994-2014

Sean C. Ewing is an American politician and electrical engineer serving as a member of the city council of Mebane, North Carolina, a position he has held since 2019. A member of the Democratic Party, he was an unsuccessful candidate for the North Carolina Senate in 2022 and he won in a campaign for the Alamance County Board of Commissioners in the 2026 election.

== Early life and career ==
Ewing was born in Elyria, Ohio. In 1999, he enlisted in the United States Air Force, where he worked as an avionics craftsman on F-16 fighter aircraft. He transferred to the Air National Guard in 2005 and continued to serve until 2014. During his military service he earned an associate's degree in avionics systems technology and, in 2011, a bachelor's degree in electrical and computer engineering. Following his military service, Ewing worked as an electrical hardware engineer for Volvo Group Trucks in Greensboro. Ewing currently lives in Mebane, North Carolina.

== Political career ==
=== Mebane City Council ===
Ewing was elected to Mebane's nonpartisan city council in 2019. In July 2025, following flooding from Tropical Storm Chantal that left the city under severe water restrictions, Ewing helped coordinate the distribution of bottled water at the Mebane Arts and Community Center and spoke publicly about the strain on the city's water system. Ewing cast the lone dissenting vote against a 4–1 rezoning that converted an area in Mebane from industrial to retail and residential use for a development anchored by a new Buc-ee's, saying at the hearing that he was concerned the city was prioritizing short-term growth over long-term industrial employment.

=== 2022 North Carolina Senate campaign ===
Ewing ran as the Democratic nominee for the North Carolina Senate in District 25 for the 2022 North Carolina Senate elections, challenging Republican incumbent Amy Galey. During the campaign he emphasized Medicaid expansion, economic development, and clean energy, including support for electric vehicles and solar power. He was defeated by Galey.

=== 2026 Alamance County commissioner campaign ===
In October 2025, Ewing announced that he would seek a seat on the Alamance County Board of Commissioners in the 2026 election. He entered a March 2026 Democratic primary alongside Ramona Allen and Warren L. Parks Jr., with two candidates from each party advancing to the November general election. In his campaign, Ewing emphasized support for public schools, responsible growth, and infrastructure improvements, and said he supported a revenue-neutral county tax rate following property revaluation. Ewing went on to win a seat on the board in the general election.
