= Amy Galey =

American politician from North Carolina

Senator Amy Galey
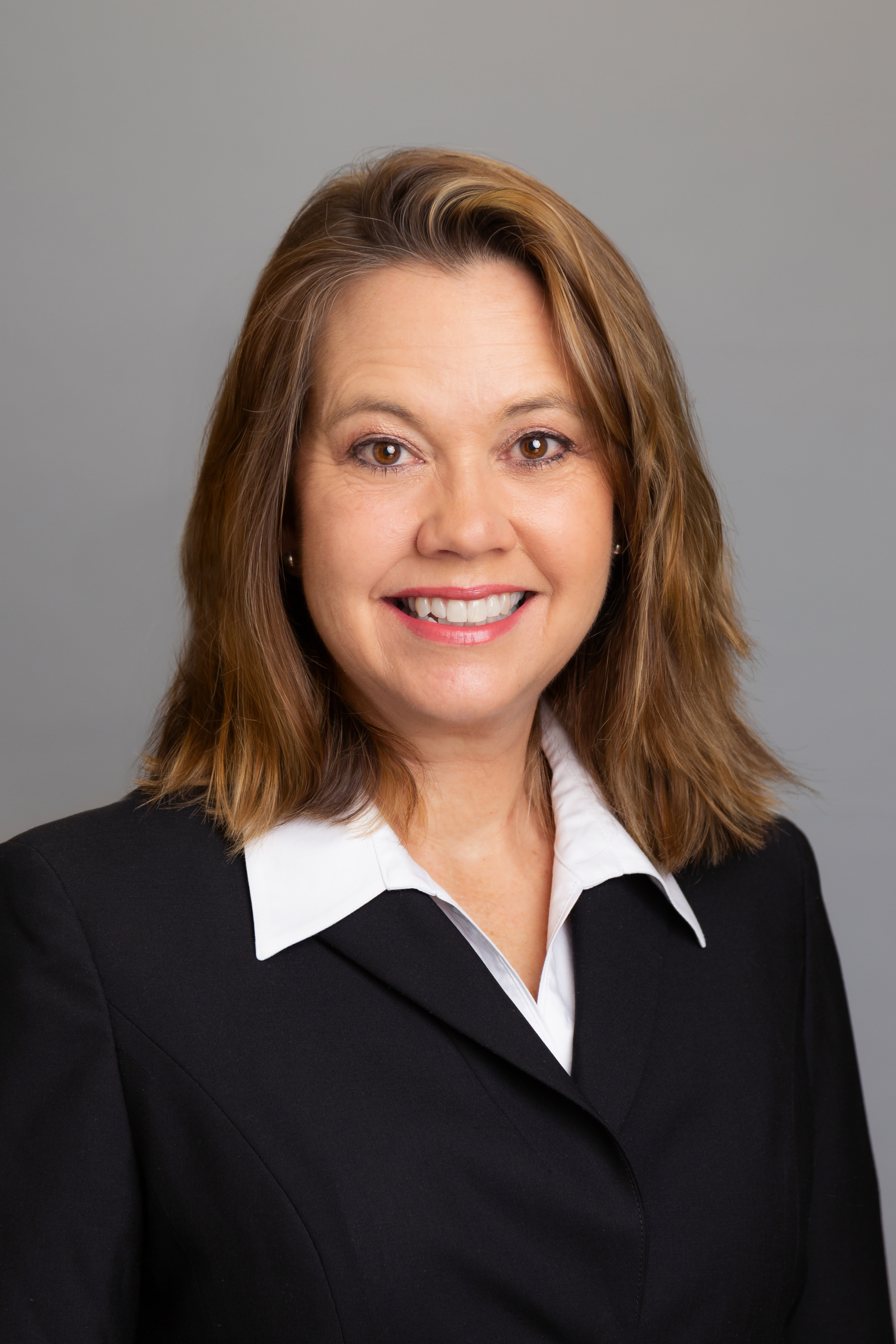

Member of the North Carolina Senate
- Incumbent
- Assumed office January 1, 2021
- Preceded by: Rick Gunn
- Constituency: 24th District (2021–2023); 25th District (2023– Present)

Member of the Alamance County Board of Commissioners
- In office December 5, 2016 – January 1, 2021
- Preceded by: Linda Massey; David I. Smith; Roger Parker
- Succeeded by: Craig Turner

Personal details
- Party: Republican
- Spouse: Fred
- Children: 3
- Education: University of North Carolina at Chapel Hill (BA); University of North Carolina School of Law (JD)

Amy Scott Galey is an American politician currently serving in the North Carolina Senate. A Republican from Burlington, North Carolina, she has represented the 25th district (including constituents in Alamance and Randolph counties) and its predecessors since 2021.

== Electoral history ==
=== 2022 ===
North Carolina Senate 25th district general election, 2022
Party	Candidate	Votes	%
Republican	Amy Galey (incumbent)	47,355	62.82%
Democratic	Sean C. Ewing	28,031	37.18%
Total votes		75,386	100%
Republican hold			

=== 2020 ===
North Carolina Senate 24th district general election, 2020
Party	Candidate	Votes	%
Republican	Amy Galey	61,287	52.43%
Democratic	J.D. Wooten	55,609	47.57%
Total votes		116,896	100%
Republican hold			

=== 2018 ===
Alamance County Board of Commissioners election, 2018
Party	Candidate	Votes	%
Republican	Amy Galey (incumbent)	29,861	28.14%
Republican	Steven J. Carter	26,619	25.08%
Democratic	Bob Byrd (incumbent)	25,313	23.85%
Democratic	Kristen Powers	24,326	22.92%
Total votes		106,119	100%
Republican hold			
Republican gain from Democratic			

== Committee assignments ==
=== 2021-2022 Session ===
- Appropriations on Justice and Public Safety
- Education/Higher Education
- Judiciary
- State and Local Government

North Carolina Senate
Preceded by Rick Gunn	Member of the North Carolina Senate from the 24th district 2021–2023	Succeeded by Danny Britt
Preceded by Tom McInnis	Member of the North Carolina Senate from the 25th district 2023–Present	Incumbent
