= Tom McInnis (North Carolina politician) =

American politician

Senator Tom McInnis
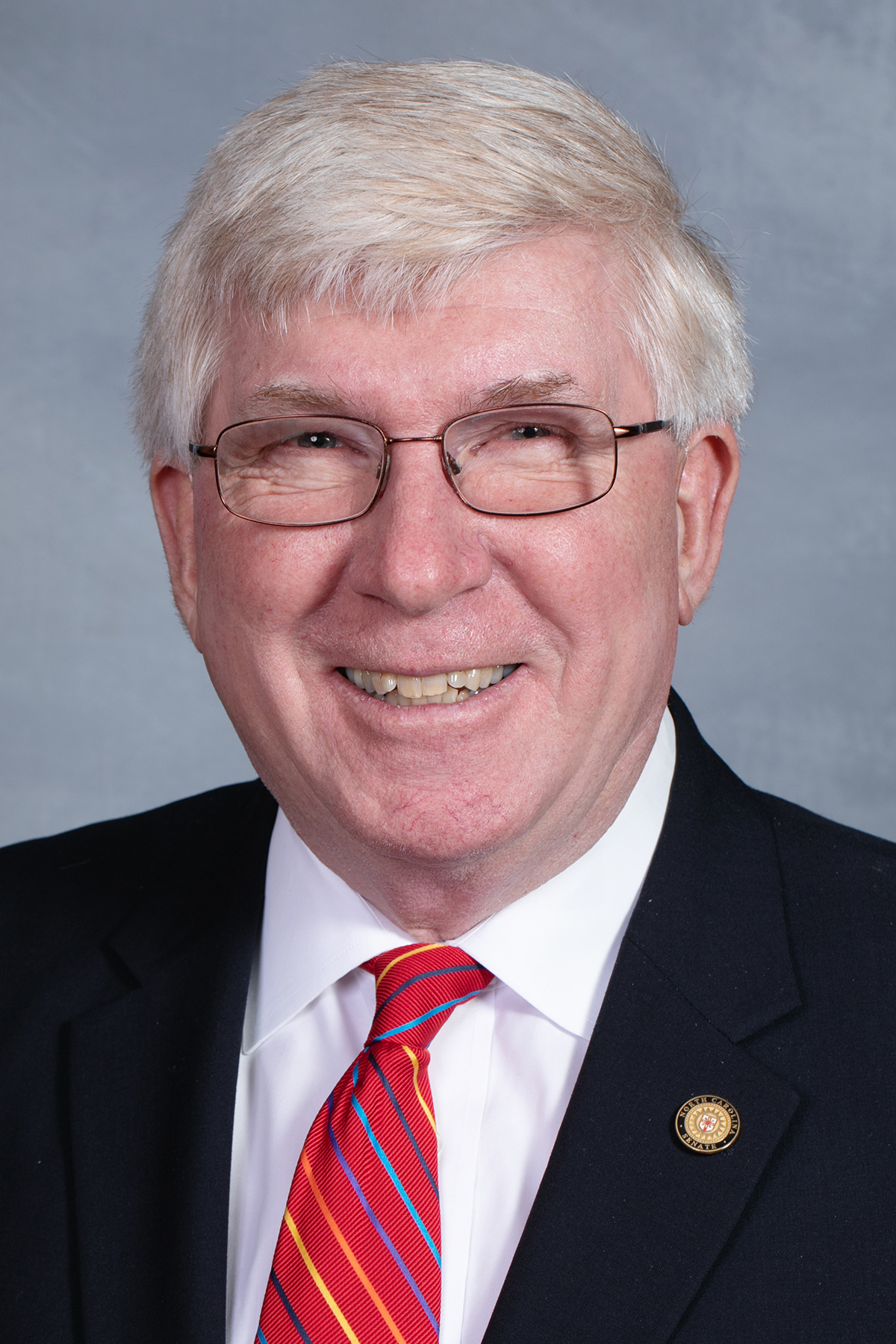

Member of the North Carolina Senate
- Incumbent
- Assumed office January 1, 2015
- Preceded by: Gene McLaurin
- Constituency: 25th District (2015–2023); 21st District (2023–Present)

Personal details
- Born: April 16, 1954 (age 72) Richmond County, North Carolina, U.S.
- Party: Republican
- Spouse: Janice Russell-McInnis
- Children: 4
- Education: Indiana University
- Occupation: Real Estate Executive/Auctioneer

Thomas Moses McInnis (born April 16, 1954) is an American politician. He was elected to the North Carolina State Senate in 2014. A Republican, he serves the 21st senate district. He previously served the 25th senate district until 2023. Due to the redrawing of the legislative district maps in 2018, the 25th District now includes Anson, Moore, Richmond and Scotland counties.

McInnis was born in Richmond County, North Carolina; he is the son of a farmer and a public-school teacher, and grew up in a working-class family farm. McInnis began a business in the auction marketing industry, establishing the Iron Horse Auction Company in 1983. According to The Land Report, Iron Horse Auction Company was named one of the top 10 auction companies in the United States in 2013.

Currently in his sixth term of the North Carolina State Senate, McInnis is the Chairperson of the Senate Transportation Committee for Policy and Appropriations as well as the Co-Chair of the Agriculture and Forestry Study Commission. Other committee appointments include: Commerce and Insurance, State and Local Government, Agriculture Environmental and Natural Resources, Select Committee on Prison Safety, Education and Higher Education, Appropriation and Base Budget.

== Awards and achievements ==
- Richmond Community College Foundation Citizen of the Year, 2020
- The Henry W. Little, III Community Leadership Award given by The Anson County Chamber of Commerce
- Delta Waterfowl Legislator of the Year, 2017
- North Carolina Trappers Association Legislator of the Year, 2017
- NC Forestry Association Legislator of the Year, 2016
- Served 8 years on the Richmond County Board of Education
- Appointed by Congressman Robin Hayes to the 8th Congressional District Agricultural Advisory Committee
- Elected to the North Carolina Auctioneers Association Hall of Fame in 1994
- Recipient of the Prestigious National Auctioneers Association President's Award of Distinction
- Served 2 Terms on the National Auctioneers Board of Directors
- Appointed by Governor Jim Martin to serve 2 terms on the North Carolina Auctioneers Licensing Board
- Memberships and Associations: Lifetime Member and Former Consultant to the National Rifle Association, Member of the North Carolina Forestry Association

== Current political ratings ==
- North Carolina Chamber of Commerce: 100%
- American Conservative Union's Award for Conservative Excellence: 90-100%
- NC Free Enterprise Foundation: The 6th Most Effective NC State Senator
- Civitas Action Legislation Effectiveness Rating: 90.9%
- NRA Political Victory Fund – A+ Rated

== Electoral history ==
=== 2022 ===
North Carolina Senate 21st district general election, 2022
Party	Candidate	Votes	%
Republican	Tom McInnis (incumbent)	36,468	54.63%
Democratic	Frank McNeill Jr.	30,281	45.37%
Total votes		66,749	100%
Republican hold			

=== 2020 ===
North Carolina Senate 25th district general election, 2020
Party	Candidate	Votes	%
Republican	Tom McInnis (incumbent)	60,152	59.15%
Democratic	Helen Probst Mills	41,546	40.85%
Total votes		101,698	100%
Republican hold			

=== 2018 ===
North Carolina Senate 25th district Republican primary election, 2018
Party	Candidate	Votes	%
Republican	Tom McInnis (incumbent))	8,911	60.98%
Republican	Michelle Lexo	5,701	39.02%
Total votes		14,612	100%

North Carolina Senate 25th district general election, 2018
Party	Candidate	Votes	%
Republican	Tom McInnis (incumbent)	41,601	57.09%
Democratic	Helen Probst Mills	31,268	42.91%
Total votes		72,869	100%
Republican hold			

=== 2016 ===
North Carolina Senate 25th district general election, 2016
Party	Candidate	Votes	%
Republican	Tom McInnis (incumbent)	53,621	63.81%
Democratic	Dannie M. Montgomery	30,416	36.19%
Total votes		84,037	100%
Republican hold			

=== 2014 ===
North Carolina Senate 25th district general election, 2014
Party	Candidate	Votes	%
Republican	Tom McInnis	28,496	50.40%
Democratic	Gene McLaurin (incumbent)	26,632	47.10%
Libertarian	P.H. Dawkins	1,412	2.50%
Total votes		56,540	100%
Republican gain from Democratic			

North Carolina Senate
Preceded by Gene McLaurin	Member of the North Carolina Senate from the 25th district 2015–2023	Succeeded by Amy Galey
Preceded by Ben Clark	Member of the North Carolina Senate from the 21st district 2023–Present	Incumbent
