= Kathy Harrington =

American politician

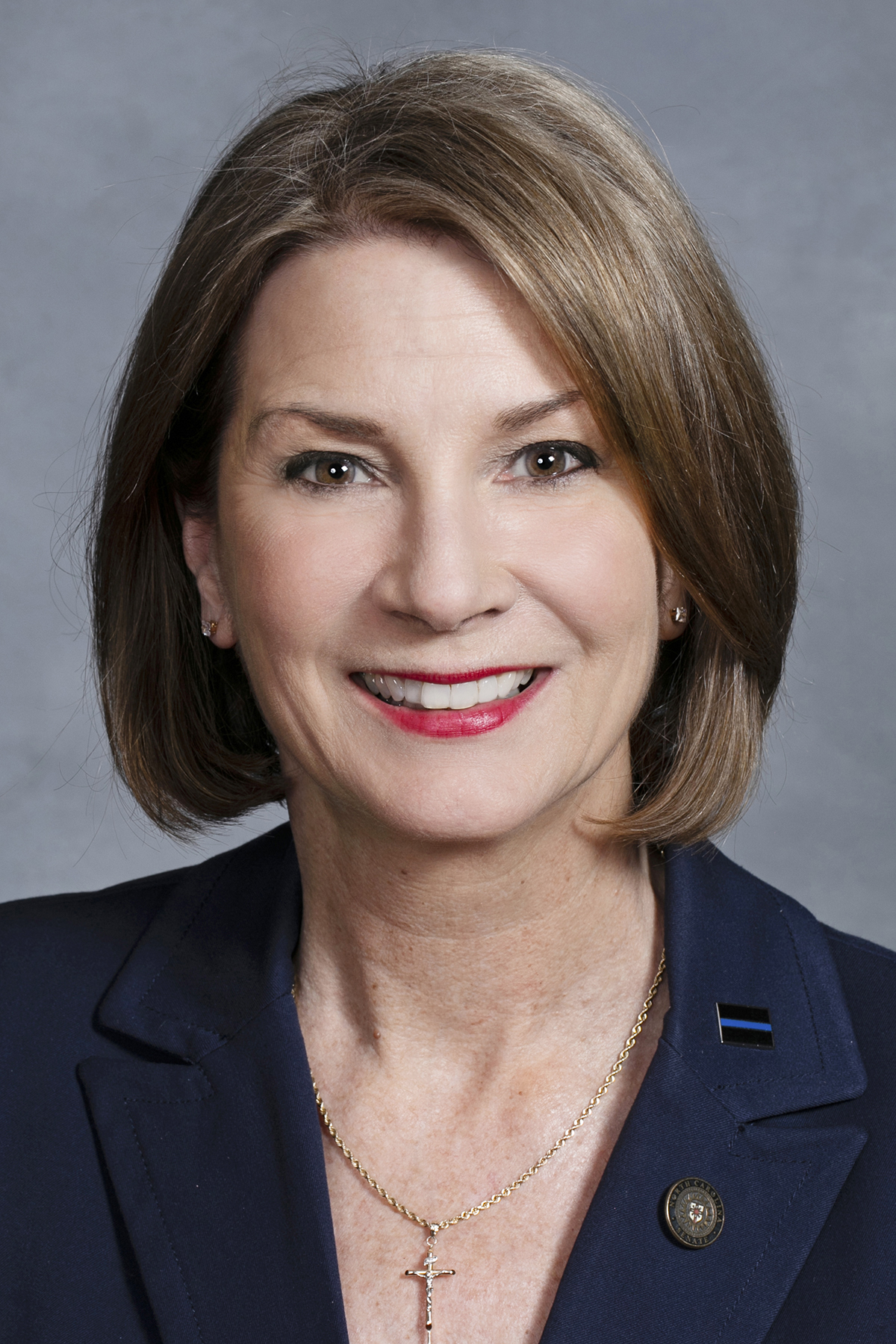

Majority Leader of the North Carolina Senate
- In office January 1, 2021 – January 1, 2023
- Preceded by: Harry Brown
- Succeeded by: Paul Newton

Member of the North Carolina Senate from the 43rd district
- In office January 1, 2011 – January 1, 2023
- Preceded by: David Hoyle
- Succeeded by: Brad Overcash

Personal details
- Born: December 24, 1958 (age 67) Gastonia, North Carolina, U.S.
- Party: Republican
- Education: Gaston College

Kathryn Harrington (born December 24, 1958) is an American politician who has served in the North Carolina Senate from the 43rd district since 2011. She was elected Senate Majority Leader by her Republican colleagues following the 2020 elections - making her the first woman elected to that position.

== Electoral history ==
=== 2020 ===
North Carolina Senate 43rd district general election, 2020
Party	Candidate	Votes	%
Republican	Kathy Harrington (incumbent)	69,409	65.43%
Democratic	William Young	36,670	34.57%
Total votes		106,079	100%
Republican hold			

=== 2018 ===
North Carolina Senate 43rd district general election, 2018
Party	Candidate	Votes	%
Republican	Kathy Harrington (incumbent)	42,906	63.39%
Democratic	Altriese Price	22,881	33.80%
Libertarian	Mitchell D. Bridges	1,900	2.81%
Total votes		67,687	100%
Republican hold			

=== 2016 ===
North Carolina Senate 43rd district general election, 2016
Party	Candidate	Votes	%
Republican	Kathy Harrington (incumbent)	65,054	100%
Total votes		65,054	100%
Republican hold			

=== 2014 ===
North Carolina Senate 43rd district general election, 2014
Party	Candidate	Votes	%
Republican	Kathy Harrington (incumbent)	36,978	100%
Total votes		36,978	100%
Republican hold			

=== 2012 ===
North Carolina Senate 43rd district general election, 2012
Party	Candidate	Votes	%
Republican	Kathy Harrington (incumbent)	57,752	100%
Total votes		57,752	100%
Republican hold			

=== 2010 ===
North Carolina Senate 43rd district Republican primary election, 2010
Party	Candidate	Votes	%
Republican	Kathy Harrington	3,927	57.97%
Republican	Wil Neumann	1,960	28.93%
Republican	Ken Bowen	738	10.89%
Republican	James "Jim" England	149	2.20%
Total votes		6,774	100%

North Carolina Senate 43rd district general election, 2010
Party	Candidate	Votes	%
Republican	Kathy Harrington	28,504	69.54%
Democratic	Jim Long	12,488	30.46%
Total votes		40,992	100%
Republican gain from Democratic			

=== 2008 ===
North Carolina Senate 43rd district general election, 2008
Party	Candidate	Votes	%
Democratic	David Hoyle (incumbent)	35,838	51.47%
Republican	Kathy Harrington	33,791	48.53%
Total votes		69,629	100%
Democratic hold			

North Carolina Senate
Preceded by Harry Brown	Majority Leader of the North Carolina Senate; 2021–2023	Succeeded by Paul Newton
