= Brad Overcash =

American politician

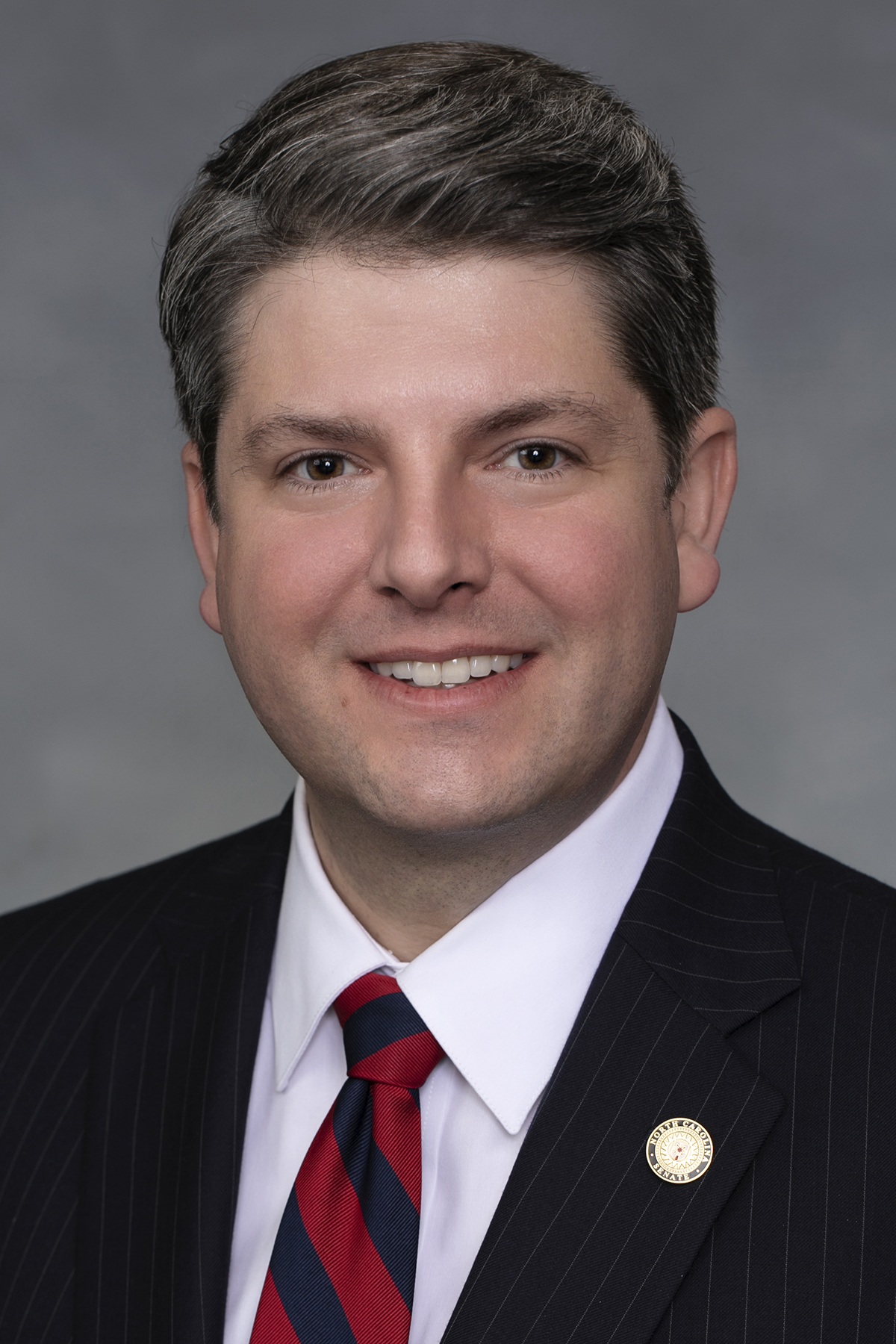

Member of the North Carolina Senate from the 43rd district
- Incumbent
- Assumed office January 1, 2023
- Preceded by: Kathy Harrington

Personal details
- Born: 1980 or 1981 (age 45–46)
- Party: Republican
- Education: University of North Carolina at Chapel Hill (BA); University of Mississippi (JD)
- Website: https://bradovercash.com/

Brad Overcash (born 1980 or 1981) is an American politician who has served as a member of the North Carolina Senate since January 1, 2023. A Republican from Belmont, he represents the 43rd district. Overcash is a graduate of University of North Carolina at Chapel Hill and the University of Mississippi.

== Committees ==
=== 2025-2026 ===
Overcash was assigned to the following committees:

- Appropriations on Education/Higher Education Committee (Chairman)
- Commerce and Insurance Committee
- Education/Higher Education Committee (Chairman)
- Senate Judiciary Committee
- Elections (Chairman)
- Finance

=== 2023-2024 ===
Overcash was assigned to the following committees:

- Appropriations on Education/Higher Education Committee
- Commerce and Insurance Committee
- Education/Higher Education Committee
- Senate Judiciary Committee
- Pensions and Retirement and Aging Committee
