= North Carolina's 24th Senate district =

American legislative district

North Carolina's 24th State Senate district
Senator
Danny Britt; R–Lumberton
- Demographics: 30% White; 28% Black; 11% Hispanic; 1% Asian; 26% Native American; 1% Other; 4% Multiracial
- Population (2023): 204,313

North Carolina's 24th Senate district is one of 50 districts in the North Carolina Senate. It has been represented by Republican Danny Britt since 2023.

== Geography ==
Since 2023, the district has included all of Robeson, Hoke, and Scotland counties. The district overlaps with the 46th, 47th, and 48th state house districts.

== District officeholders ==
Senator	Party	Dates	Notes	Counties
Lura Self Tally (Fayetteville)	Democratic	January 1, 1993 – January 1, 1995	Redistricted from the 12th district. Retired.	1993–2003; Part of Cumberland County.
Tony Rand (Fayetteville)	Democratic	January 1, 1995 – January 1, 2003	Redistricted to the 19th district.	1993–2003; Part of Cumberland County.
Hugh Webster (Burlington)	Republican	January 1, 2003 – January 1, 2007	Redistricted from the 21st district. Lost re-election.	2003–2013; All of Alamance and Caswell counties.
Tony Foriest (Graham)	Democratic	January 1, 2007 – January 1, 2011	Lost re-election.	2003–2013; All of Alamance and Caswell counties.
Rick Gunn (Burlington)	Republican	January 1, 2011 – January 1, 2021	Retired.	2003–2013; All of Alamance and Caswell counties.
Rick Gunn (Burlington)	Republican	January 1, 2011 – January 1, 2021	Retired.	2013–2019; All of Alamance County. Part of Randolph County.
Rick Gunn (Burlington)	Republican	January 1, 2011 – January 1, 2021	Retired.	2019–2023; All of Alamance County. Part of Guilford County.
Amy Galey (Burlington)	Republican	January 1, 2021 – January 1, 2023	Redistricted to the 25th district.	2019–2023; All of Alamance County. Part of Guilford County.
Danny Britt (Lumberton)	Republican	January 1, 2023 – Present	Redistricted from the 13th district.	2023–Present; All of Robeson, Hoke, and Scotland counties.

== Election results ==
=== 2024 ===
North Carolina Senate 24th district general election, 2024
Party	Candidate	Votes	%
Republican	Danny Britt (incumbent)	47,538	58.74%
Democratic	Kathy Batt	33,387	41.26%
Total votes		80,925	100%
Republican hold			

=== 2022 ===
North Carolina Senate 24th district general election, 2022
Party	Candidate	Votes	%
Republican	Danny Britt (incumbent)	28,761	58.32%
Democratic	Darrel "BJ" Gibson Jr.	20,551	41.68%
Total votes		49,312	100%
Republican hold			

=== 2020 ===
North Carolina Senate 24th district general election, 2020
Party	Candidate	Votes	%
Republican	Amy Galey	61,287	52.43%
Democratic	J. D. Wooten	55,609	47.57%
Total votes		116,896	100%
Republican hold			

=== 2018 ===
North Carolina Senate 24th district general election, 2018
Party	Candidate	Votes	%
Republican	Rick Gunn (incumbent)	42,324	53.86%
Democratic	J. D. Wooten	36,255	46.14%
Total votes		78,579	100%
Republican hold			

=== 2016 ===
North Carolina Senate 24th district general election, 2016
Party	Candidate	Votes	%
Republican	Rick Gunn (incumbent)	51,833	60.77%
Democratic	John Thorpe	33,456	39.23%
Total votes		85,289	100%
Republican hold			

=== 2014 ===
North Carolina Senate 24th district general election, 2014
Party	Candidate	Votes	%
Republican	Rick Gunn (incumbent)	37,454	100%
Total votes		37,454	100%
Republican hold			

=== 2012 ===
North Carolina Senate 24th district general election, 2012
Party	Candidate	Votes	%
Republican	Rick Gunn (incumbent)	51,230	79.02%
Democratic	Brandon Black	13,605	20.98%
Total votes		64,835	100%
Republican hold			

=== 2010 ===
North Carolina Senate 24th district general election, 2010
Party	Candidate	Votes	%
Republican	Rick Gunn	25,674	52.92%
Democratic	Tony Foriest (incumbent)	20,430	42.11%
Libertarian	Barry Coe	2,412	4.97%
Total votes		48,516	100%
Republican gain from Democratic			

=== 2008 ===
North Carolina Senate 24th district general election, 2008
Party	Candidate	Votes	%
Democratic	Tony Foriest (incumbent)	38,539	52.51%
Republican	Rick Gunn	34,854	47.49%
Total votes		73,393	100%
Democratic hold			

=== 2006 ===
North Carolina Senate 24th district Democratic primary election, 2006
Party	Candidate	Votes	%
Democratic	Tony Foriest	2,090	70.06%
Democratic	Tim Purgason	893	29.94%
Total votes		2,983	100%

North Carolina Senate 24th district Republican primary election, 2006
Party	Candidate	Votes	%
Republican	Hugh Webster (incumbent)	1,716	77.09%
Republican	Phoebe M. Harrison	510	22.91%
Total votes		2,226	100%

North Carolina Senate 24th district general election, 2006
Party	Candidate	Votes	%
Democratic	Tony Foriest	16,973	50.69%
Republican	Hugh Webster (incumbent)	16,513	49.31%
Total votes		33,486	100%
Democratic gain from Republican			

=== 2004 ===
North Carolina Senate 24th district Democratic primary election, 2004
Party	Candidate	Votes	%
Democratic	Tony Foriest	4,773	68.34%
Democratic	Tim Purgason	2,211	31.66%
Total votes		6,984	100%

North Carolina Senate 24th district general election, 2004
Party	Candidate	Votes	%
Republican	Hugh Webster (incumbent)	35,989	57.94%
Democratic	Tony Foriest	26,127	42.06%
Total votes		62,116	100%
Republican hold			

=== 2002 ===
North Carolina Senate 24th district general election, 2002
Party	Candidate	Votes	%
Republican	Hugh Webster (incumbent)	23,685	57.79%
Democratic	Bill Powell	17,299	42.21%
Total votes		40,984	100%
Republican hold			

=== 2000 ===
North Carolina Senate 24th district Republican primary election, 2000
Party	Candidate	Votes	%
Republican	Lois Kirby	2,379	57.97%
Republican	Darryl M. Davis	1,725	42.03%
Total votes		4,104	100%

North Carolina Senate 24th district general election, 2000
Party	Candidate	Votes	%
Democratic	Tony Rand (incumbent)	28,732	59.10%
Republican	Lois Kirby	19,887	40.90%
Total votes		48,619	100%
Democratic hold			
