= Danny Britt =

American politician from North Carolina

Senator Danny Britt
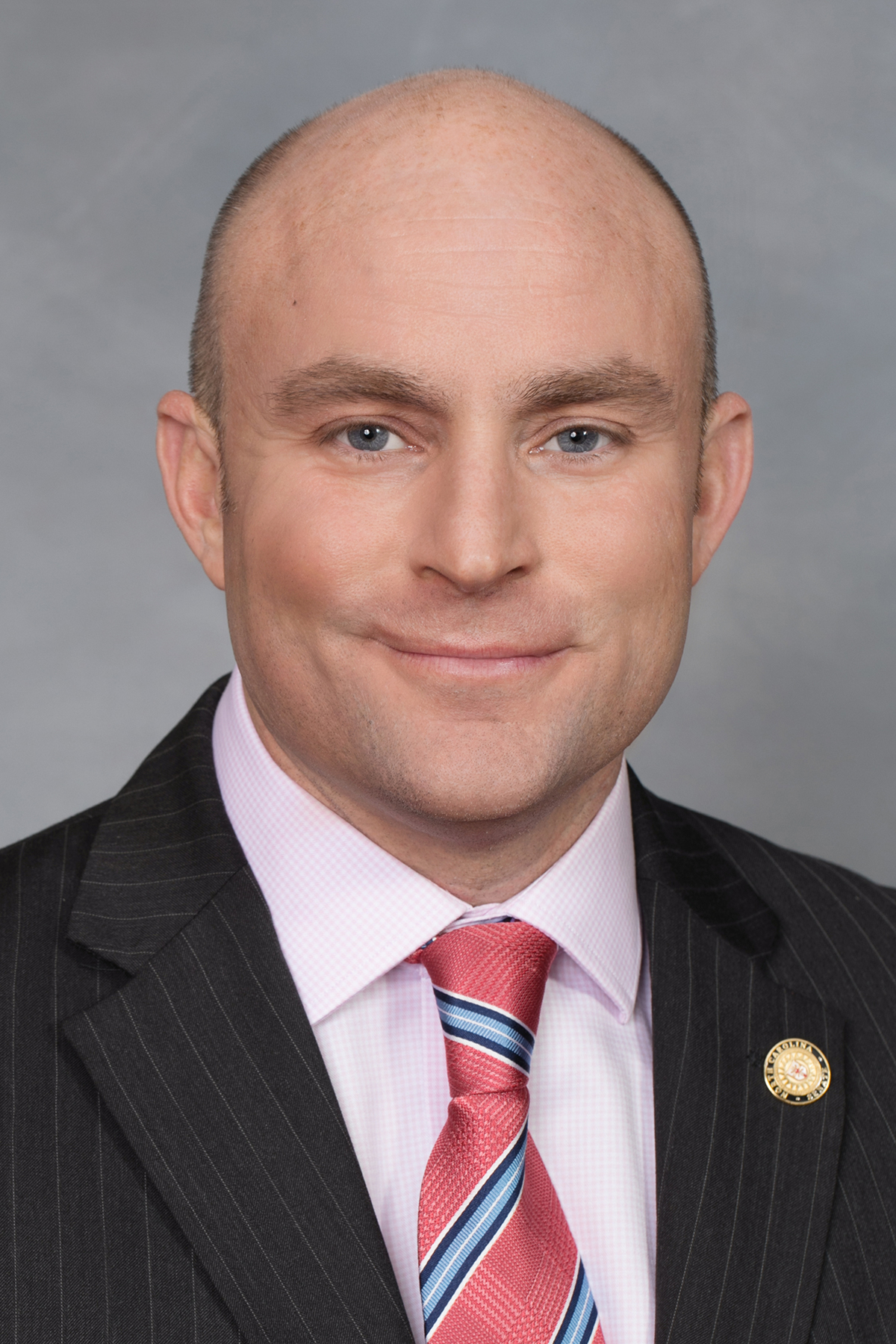

Member of the North Carolina Senate
- Incumbent
- Assumed office January 1, 2017
- Preceded by: Jane Smith
- Constituency: 13th District (2017–2023); 24th District (2023–Present)

Personal details
- Born: Danny Earl Britt Jr. July 6, 1979 (age 47) Lumberton, North Carolina, U.S.
- Party: Republican (2015-present)
- Other political affiliations: Democratic (until 2010)
- Spouse: Jill Cassady (m. 2007)
- Children: 2
- Education: Appalachian State University (BA); University of Oklahoma (JD)
- Profession: Attorney

Military service
- Branch/service: United States Army; North Carolina Army National Guard
- Rank: Lieutenant Colonel

Danny Earl Britt Jr. (born July 6, 1979) is a Republican member of the North Carolina Senate, having represented the 24th district and its predecessors since 2017. He is a Lt. Colonel in the North Carolina Army National Guard. Britt is the first Republican to have been elected to the seat since the Reconstruction Era.

== Committee assignments ==
=== 2025-2026 session ===
- Appropriations - Justice and Public Safety (Chair)
- Commerce and Insurance (Chair)
- Judiciary (Chair)
- Appropriations/Base Budget
- Health Care
- Pensions and Retirement and Aging
- Rules and Operations of the Senate

=== 2021-2022 session ===
- Appropriations/Base Budget
- Appropriations - Justice and Public Safety (Chair)
- Judiciary (Chair)
- Transportation (Chair)
- Commerce and Insurance
- Finance
- Health Care

=== 2019-2020 session ===
- Appropriations/Base Budget
- Appropriations - Justice and Public Safety (Chair)
- Judiciary (Chair)
- Transportation
- Pensions, Retirement and Aging
- Redistricting and Elections

=== 2017-2018 session ===
- Appropriations - Justice and Public Safety
- Agriculture/Environment/Natural Resources
- Judiciary
- State and Local Government
- Transportation

== Electoral history ==
=== 2022 ===
North Carolina Senate 24th district general election, 2022
| Party | Candidate | Votes | % |
|---|---|---|---|
| Republican | Danny Britt (incumbent) | 28,717 | 58.35% |
| Democratic | Darrel "BJ" Gibson Jr. | 20,494 | 41.65% |
| Total votes | | 49,211 | 100% |
| Republican hold | | | |

=== 2020 ===
North Carolina Senate 13th district general election, 2020
| Party | Candidate | Votes | % |
|---|---|---|---|
| Republican | Danny Britt (incumbent) | 45,264 | 63.56% |
| Democratic | Barbara Yates-Lockamy | 25,949 | 36.44% |
| Total votes | | 71,213 | 100% |
| Republican hold | | | |

=== 2018 ===
North Carolina Senate 13th district general election, 2018
| Party | Candidate | Votes | % |
|---|---|---|---|
| Republican | Danny Britt (incumbent) | 31,106 | 62.50% |
| Democratic | John Campbell | 18,661 | 37.50% |
| Total votes | | 49,767 | 100% |
| Republican hold | | | |

=== 2016 ===
North Carolina Senate 13th district general election, 2016
| Party | Candidate | Votes | % |
|---|---|---|---|
| Republican | Danny Britt | 34,126 | 54.98% |
| Democratic | Jane Smith (incumbent) | 27,940 | 45.02% |
| Total votes | | 62,066 | 100% |
| Republican gain from Democratic | | | |

North Carolina Senate
| Preceded by Jane Smith | Member of the North Carolina Senate from the 13th district 2017–2023 | Succeeded by Lisa Grafstein |
| Preceded by Amy Galey | Member of the North Carolina Senate from the 24th district 2023–Present | Incumbent |
