= David W. Hoyle =

American politician (1939–2023)

Member of the North Carolina Senate from the 43rd district
- In office January 1, 1993 – October 22, 2010
- Preceded by: District created
- Succeeded by: Kathy Harrington

Personal details
- Born: February 4, 1939
- Died: March 29, 2023 (aged 84) Dallas, North Carolina, U.S.
- Party: Democratic
- Spouse: Linda
- Children: 4
- Education: Lenoir–Rhyne College
- Profession: Politician

David W. Hoyle (February 4, 1939 – March 29, 2023) was an American politician from North Carolina. He was a Democratic member of the North Carolina General Assembly representing the state's forty-third Senate district from 1993 to 2010, and the state's secretary of revenue from 2010 to 2013. A real estate developer from Dallas, North Carolina, he served as the mayor of the town and was a graduate of Lenoir–Rhyne College.

Hoyle announced in 2009 that he would retire at the end of the 2009–10 session of the legislature, in what was his ninth term in the state Senate. Shortly before the expiration of his term in 2010, Gov. Beverly Perdue appointed him Secretary of Revenue, a Cabinet post. He served until Perdue left office in 2013.

Hoyle and his wife, Linda, had four children. He died at his home in Dallas, North Carolina, on March 29, 2023, at the age of 84, from complications of a stroke he had several years prior.
