= North Carolina's 43rd Senate district =

American legislative district

North Carolina's 43rd State Senate district
Senator
Brad Overcash; R–Belmont
- Demographics: 66% White; 18% Black; 10% Hispanic; 2% Asian; 4% Multiracial
- Population (2023): 215,110

North Carolina's 43rd Senate district is one of 50 districts in the North Carolina Senate. It has been represented by Republican Brad Overcash since 2023.

== Geography ==
Since 2003, the district has covered most of Gaston County. The district overlaps with the 108th, 109th, and 110th state house districts.

== District officeholders since 2003 ==
Senator	Party	Dates	Notes	Counties
District created January 1, 2003.				2003–Present; Part of Gaston County.
David Hoyle (Dallas)	Democratic	January 1, 2003 – October 22, 2010	Retired and Resigned to become North Carolina Secretary of Revenue.	2003–Present; Part of Gaston County.
Vacant		October 22, 2010 - January 1, 2011		2003–Present; Part of Gaston County.
Kathy Harrington (Gastonia)	Republican	January 1, 2011 – January 1, 2023	Retired.	2003–Present; Part of Gaston County.
Brad Overcash (Belmont)	Republican	January 1, 2023 – Present		2003–Present; Part of Gaston County.

== Election results ==
=== 2024 ===
North Carolina Senate 43rd district general election, 2024
Party	Candidate	Votes	%
Republican	Brad Overcash (incumbent)	66,112	61.78%
Democratic	Corey Creech	40,893	38.22%
Total votes		107,005	100%
Republican hold			

=== 2022 ===
North Carolina Senate 43rd district general election, 2022
Party	Candidate	Votes	%
Republican	Brad Overcash	48,218	100%
Total votes		48,218	100%
Republican hold			

=== 2020 ===
North Carolina Senate 43rd district general election, 2020
Party	Candidate	Votes	%
Republican	Kathy Harrington (incumbent)	69,409	65.43%
Democratic	William Young	36,670	34.57%
Total votes		106,079	100%
Republican hold			

=== 2018 ===
North Carolina Senate 43rd district general election, 2018
Party	Candidate	Votes	%
Republican	Kathy Harrington (incumbent)	42,906	63.39%
Democratic	Altriese Price	22,881	33.80%
Libertarian	Mitchell D. Bridges	1,900	2.81%
Total votes		67,687	100%
Republican hold			

=== 2016 ===
North Carolina Senate 43rd district general election, 2016
Party	Candidate	Votes	%
Republican	Kathy Harrington (incumbent)	65,054	100%
Total votes		65,054	100%
Republican hold			

=== 2014 ===
North Carolina Senate 43rd district general election, 2014
Party	Candidate	Votes	%
Republican	Kathy Harrington (incumbent)	36,978	100%
Total votes		36,978	100%
Republican hold			

=== 2012 ===
North Carolina Senate 43rd district general election, 2012
Party	Candidate	Votes	%
Republican	Kathy Harrington (incumbent)	57,752	100%
Total votes		57,752	100%
Republican hold			

=== 2010 ===
North Carolina Senate 43rd district Republican primary election, 2010
Party	Candidate	Votes	%
Republican	Kathy Harrington	3,927	57.97%
Republican	Wil Neumann	1,960	28.93%
Republican	Ken Bowen	738	10.89%
Republican	James "Jim" England	149	2.20%
Total votes		6,774	100%

North Carolina Senate 43rd district general election, 2010
Party	Candidate	Votes	%
Republican	Kathy Harrington	28,504	69.54%
Democratic	Jim Long	12,488	30.46%
Total votes		40,992	100%
Republican gain from Democratic			

=== 2008 ===
North Carolina Senate 43rd district general election, 2008
Party	Candidate	Votes	%
Democratic	David Hoyle (incumbent)	35,838	51.47%
Republican	Kathy Harrington	33,791	48.53%
Total votes		69,629	100%
Democratic hold			

=== 2006 ===
North Carolina Senate 43rd district general election, 2006
Party	Candidate	Votes	%
Democratic	David Hoyle (incumbent)	21,419	100%
Total votes		21,419	100%
Democratic hold			

=== 2004 ===
North Carolina Senate 43rd district general election, 2004
Party	Candidate	Votes	%
Democratic	David Hoyle (incumbent)	28,264	53.76%
Republican	Russell Fleming	24,311	46.24%
Total votes		52,575	100%
Democratic hold			

=== 2002 ===
North Carolina Senate 43rd district general election, 2002
Party	Candidate	Votes	%
Democratic	David Hoyle (incumbent)	18,958	53.01%
Republican	Michael Harrington	16,805	46.99%
Total votes		35,763	100%
Democratic hold			
