= Michael Munger =

American economist (born 1958)

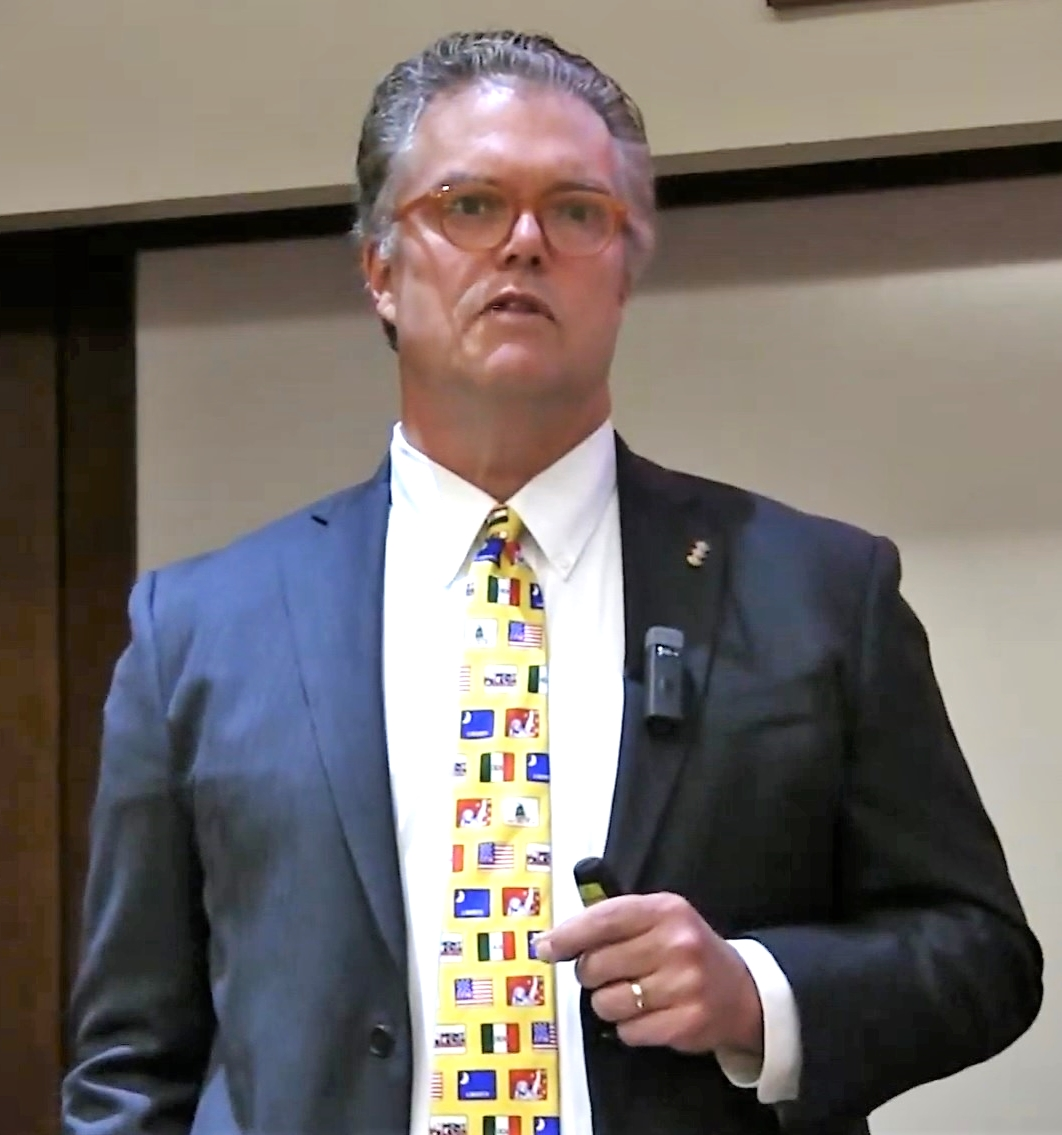
- Munger speaking in 2021
- Born: September 23, 1958 (age 68); Gotha, Florida, U.S.

Academic background
- Education: Davidson College (BA); Washington University in St. Louis (MA, Ph.D.)

Academic work
- Discipline: Political science Economics
- Institutions: Duke University; Dartmouth College; University of Texas at Austin; UNC-Chapel Hill; Federal Trade Commission
- Notable ideas: Contributions to bleeding-heart libertarian theory
- Website: Information at IDEAS / RePEc

Michael Curtis Munger (/ˈmʌnɡər/; born September 23, 1958) is an American economist and a former chair of the political science department at Duke University, where he continues to teach political science, public policy, and economics. He is a prolific writer, and his book Analyzing Policy: Choices, Conflicts, and Practices is now a standard work in the field of policy analysis. In 2008 he was the Libertarian candidate for Governor of North Carolina.

== Biography ==
Munger grew up on a Valencia orange farm south of Orlando.

Munger studied economics at Davidson College, graduating with a Bachelor of Arts in 1980. He then did graduate study in economics at Washington University in St. Louis, earning a Master of Arts in 1982 and a Ph.D. in 1984 with a dissertation entitled "Institutions and Outcomes: Two Essays on the Importance of Legislative Structure for Understanding Public Policy". He is a past president of the Public Choice Society, was the North American Editor of the journal Public Choice, and (since 2013) is a co-editor of The Independent Review, a publication of the Independent Institute, where he is a senior fellow. He has been published in the American Political Science Review, the American Journal of Political Science, and the Journal of Politics and has had books published with the Cambridge University Press and the University of Michigan Press. Since March 2012 he has been a member of the Board of Visitors of Ralston College. He also serves as an Adjunct Scholar at the Cato Institute and as a member of the Academic Council of the Jack Miller Center.

He writes for the Bleeding Heart Libertarians blog and the Learn Liberty blog.

== Career ==
Munger has worked as a staff economist for the Federal Trade Commission during the Reagan Administration and taught at Dartmouth College, the University of Texas at Austin, and UNC-Chapel Hill before becoming a political science professor at Duke University in 1997. In 2000, he became the head of Duke's political science department. His research centers around elections and campaign finance.

At Duke, Munger says he works "across the aisles – there aren't a lot of other Libertarians there."

Three scholars, namely Melvin Hinich, Douglass North and Barry Weingast, were reported to be heavily influential to Munger.

In 2011, Munger portrayed a security guard at the beginning of a video titled "Fight of the Century", featuring a rap battle between actors portraying economists John Maynard Keynes and Friedrich Hayek, discussing the effects of government spending on the economy. As of December 2017, the video has amassed over 3.8 million views.

== Political activities ==
Munger has run for multiple state-level offices in North Carolina as a Libertarian. Munger ran for the North Carolina State Senate to represent District 13 in 2022. His key issues include improving school choice for lower socioeconomic background families and "dismantling and reforming" the Alcoholic Beverage Control system in North Carolina. In 2020, Munger ran as a Libertarian for the North Carolina House of Representatives in District 34. He received 4.4% (2,449) of the votes and lost to Democrat Grier Martin.

=== 2008 gubernatorial campaign ===
Feeling that North Carolina voters needed an alternative to the two-party duopoly, Munger ran as a Libertarian candidate for Governor of North Carolina in 2008. Early in the year, Munger said that Democratic gubernatorial challenger Bev Perdue was a "Stepford Wife" and the Republican nominees were "circus clowns." Prior to May 2008, the North Carolina Libertarian Party and Munger gathered 100,000 signatures of voters in order to qualify to appear on North Carolina's ballot. They, along with the Green Party, sued the state unsuccessfully over the ballot access rules. Munger appeared as an expert witness in other cases on behalf of the Green Party and the ACLU.

Munger appeared as one of two keynote speakers at the national Libertarian convention in Denver in May 2008. He later made history as the first third-party candidate to participate in a live, televised gubernatorial debate in North Carolina.

The progressive Independent Weekly said of Munger: "Were there no substantive differences between the major-party candidates, we'd be recommending a protest vote for Libertarian Party candidate Michael C. Munger, based on the elements of his platform that make him the self-proclaimed 'liberal in the race.'"

On election day Munger received 121,585 votes for 2.85% of the total vote. Because Munger received sufficient votes, the Libertarian Party retained ballot access in the following election, a first for a new party.

Following the election, Nick Gillespie of Reason magazine wrote: "I humbly submit that Duke University political science professor Michael Munger, who ran a strong bid as a Libertarian Party candidate for governor in North Carolina, set his eyes toward an even bigger and remote target in 2012, that stationary Death Star known as the White House."

=== Political positions ===
Munger made education a centerpiece of his 2008 gubernatorial campaign, saying that allowing more charter schools is the first thing he would do: "Rich people have choices now. I want everyone to have a choice." He would give $1,500 education vouchers to low-income students in the poorest 40 counties of North Carolina. Munger argues that, since most would stay in public school, this would have the effect of increasing aid to poor schools.

In the lead up to the 2008 gubernatorial election, Munger took more socially liberal positions on many issues than the Democratic candidate for governor, Bev Perdue. He stated, "One reason I haven't been allowed in all the debates is that I'm taking votes from the Democrats. Sixty percent of my supporters are voting for Obama. I'll talk about gay marriage, and Perdue isn't, or doesn't want to." While Democratic candidate Perdue has taken a hard line on illegal immigration similar to that of Republican Pat McCrory, Munger had a position more aligned with Barack Obama.

Munger opposes the death penalty, and believes children of illegal immigrants should be allowed into University of North Carolina System schools and community colleges. He believes that the government should do what it can to prevent illegal immigrants from entering the country, but once they are here, they should be treated fairly and given access to education. Otherwise, he predicts that an "apartheid" will result "with fertile pickings for gang recruitment and exploitation by unscrupulous employers." He believes that more rural roads should be built rather than "urban highways."

== Publications ==
- Tomorrow 3.0: Transaction Costs and the Sharing Economy (2018). Cambridge University Press. ISBN 978-1108447348.
- Ideology and the Theory of Political Choice (1996). University of Michigan Press. Co-authored by Mel Henich. Ebook ISBN 978-0472027392
- Munger, Michael (2018). "Part IV: What Is the Role of the State?; Ch. 24: Government Failure and Market Failure". In Brennan, Jason; van der Vossen, Bas; Schmidtz, David (eds.). The Routledge Handbook of Libertarianism. London and New York: Taylor & Francis Group. pp. 342–357. ISBN 978-0367870591.

== See also ==
- Libertarianism in the United States
- List of economists
- Neoclassical liberalism
