= 2000 North Carolina Senate election =

- November 7, 2000

All 50 seats in the North Carolina Senate 26 (without Lieutenant Governor) seats needed for a majority
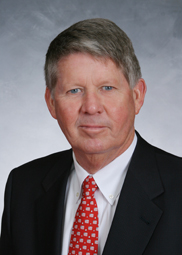

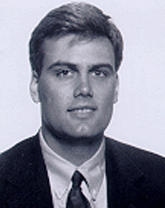
	Majority party	Minority party
Leader	Marc Basnight	Patrick J. Ballantine
Party	Democratic	Republican
Leader since	January 1, 1993	January 1, 1999
Leader's seat	1st - Manteo	4th - Wilmington
Last election	35	15
Seats won	35	15
Seat change	Steady	Steady
Popular vote	1,697,418	1,639,508
Percentage	50.28%	48.57%
- Results: Democratic hold Republican hold
President pro tempore before election
Marc Basnight
Democratic
Elected President pro tempore
Marc Basnight
Democratic

The 2000 North Carolina Senate election were held on November 7, 2000, to elect members to all fifty seats in the North Carolina Senate. The election coincided with the elections for other offices including the presidency, governorship, U.S. House of Representatives, Council of State, and state house. The primary election was held on May 2, 2000.

== Results summary ==
District	Incumbent	Party	Elected	Party
1st	Marc Basnight	Dem	Marc Basnight	Dem
2nd	Frank Ballance	Dem	Frank Ballance	Dem
3rd	Bev Perdue†	Dem	Scott Thomas	Dem
4th	Patrick J. Ballantine	Rep	Patrick J. Ballantine	Rep
5th	Charles W. Albertson	Dem	Charles W. Albertson	Dem
6th	R. L. "Bob" Martin	Dem	R. L. "Bob" Martin	Dem
7th	Luther Jordan	Dem	Luther Jordan	Dem
8th	John Kerr	Dem	John Kerr	Dem
9th	Edward Warren	Dem	Edward Warren	Dem
10th	Roy Cooper†	Dem	A. B. Swindell	Dem
11th	Allen Wellons	Dem	Allen Wellons	Dem
12th	Virginia Foxx	Rep	Virginia Foxx	Rep
12th	Don W. East†	Rep	Phil Berger	Rep
13th	Wib Gulley	Dem	Wib Gulley	Dem
13th	Jeanne Hopkins Lucas	Dem	Jeanne Hopkins Lucas	Dem
14th	Brad Miller	Dem	Brad Miller	Dem
14th	Eric Miller Reeves	Dem	Eric Miller Reeves	Dem
15th	Oscar Harris	Dem	Oscar Harris	Dem
16th	Eleanor Kinnaird	Dem	Eleanor Kinnaird	Dem
16th	Howard Lee	Dem	Howard Lee	Dem
17th	Aaron Plyler	Dem	Aaron Plyler	Dem
17th	William R. Purcell	Dem	William R. Purcell	Dem
18th	R. C. Soles Jr.	Dem	R. C. Soles Jr.	Dem
19th	Bob Shaw	Rep	Bob Shaw	Rep
20th	Linda Garrou	Dem	Linda Garrou	Dem
20th	Hamilton Horton Jr.	Rep	Hamilton Horton Jr.	Rep
21st	Hugh Webster	Rep	Hugh Webster	Rep
22nd	Fletcher L. Hartsell Jr.	Rep	Fletcher L. Hartsell Jr.	Rep
23rd	Jim Phillips Sr.†	Dem	Cal Cunningham	Dem
24th	Tony Rand	Dem	Tony Rand	Dem
25th	David W. Hoyle	Dem	David W. Hoyle	Dem
26th	Austin M. Allran	Rep	Austin M. Allran	Rep
27th	Kenneth Moore	Rep	Kenneth Moore	Rep
27th	John Garwood	Rep	John Garwood	Rep
28th	Steve Metcalf	Dem	Steve Metcalf	Dem
28th	Charles Newell Carter	Dem	Charles Newell Carter	Dem
29th	Dan Robinson	Dem	Dan Robinson	Dem
30th	David Weinstein	Dem	David Weinstein	Dem
31st	Bill Martin	Dem	Bill Martin	Dem
32nd	Kay Hagan	Dem	Kay Hagan	Dem
33rd	Charlie Dannelly	Dem	Charlie Dannelly	Dem
34th	T. L. "Fountain" Odom	Dem	T. L. "Fountain" Odom	Dem
35th	Bob Rucho	Rep	Bob Rucho	Rep
36th	John Carrington	Rep	John Carrington	Rep
37th	Walter Dalton	Dem	Walter Dalton	Dem
38th	Betsy Lane Cochrane†	Rep	Stan Bingham	Rep
39th	James Forrester	Rep	James Forrester	Rep
40th	Dan Clodfelter	Dem	Dan Clodfelter	Dem
41st	Larry Shaw	Dem	Larry Shaw	Dem
42nd	Bob Carpenter	Rep	Bob Carpenter	Rep

† - Incumbent not seeking re-election

Party	Candi- dates	Votes		Seats		
Party	Candi- dates	No.	%	No.	+/–	%
Democratic	41	1,697,418	50.28%	35	Steady	70.00%
Republican	41	1,639,508	48.57%	15	Steady	30.00%
Libertarian	8	38,851	1.15%	0	Steady	0.00%
Total	90	3,375,777	100.00%	50	Steady	100.00%

Senate seats
Democratic	70.00%
Republican	30.00%

Popular vote
Democratic	50.282%
Republican	48.567%
Libertarian	1.151%

== Detailed results ==
=== Districts 1–21 ===
==== District 1 ====
Incumbent Democratic President Pro Tempore Marc Basnight has represented the 1st district since 1985.

North Carolina Senate 1st district general election, 2000
Party	Candidate	Votes	%
Democratic	Marc Basnight (incumbent)	39,069	70.31%
Republican	Ronald Toppin	16,495	29.69%
Total votes		55,564	100%
Democratic hold			

==== District 2 ====
Incumbent Democrat Frank Ballance has represented the 2nd district since 1989.

North Carolina Senate 2nd district general election, 2000
Party	Candidate	Votes	%
Democratic	Frank Ballance (incumbent)	35,977	100%
Total votes		35,977	100%
Democratic hold			

==== District 3 ====
Incumbent Democrat Bev Perdue has represented the 3rd district since 1991. Perdue retired to run for Lieutenant Governor. Democrat Scott Thomas won the open seat.

North Carolina Senate 3rd district general election, 2000
Party	Candidate	Votes	%
Democratic	Scott Thomas	29,313	54.13%
Republican	David G. Hipps	24,836	45.87%
Total votes		54,149	100%
Democratic hold			

==== District 4 ====
Incumbent Republican Patrick J. Ballantine has represented the 4th district since 1995.

North Carolina Senate 4th district general election, 2000
Party	Candidate	Votes	%
Republican	Patrick J. Ballantine (incumbent)	47,469	65.27%
Democratic	Louise McColl	25,258	34.73%
Total votes		72,727	100%
Republican hold			

==== District 5 ====
Incumbent Democrat Charles W. Albertson has represented the 5th district since 1993.

North Carolina Senate 5th district general election, 2000
Party	Candidate	Votes	%
Democratic	Charles W. Albertson (incumbent)	28,166	59.58%
Republican	Cynthia B. Watson	19,109	40.42%
Total votes		47,275	100%
Democratic hold			

==== District 6 ====
Incumbent Democrat R. L. "Bob" Martin has represented the 6th district since 1985.

North Carolina Senate 6th district general election, 2000
Party	Candidate	Votes	%
Democratic	R. L. "Bob" Martin (incumbent)	34,645	100%
Total votes		34,645	100%
Democratic hold			

==== District 7 ====
Incumbent Democrat Luther Jordan has represented the 7th district since 1993.

North Carolina Senate 7th district general election, 2000
Party	Candidate	Votes	%
Democratic	Luther Jordan (incumbent)	17,242	69.28%
Republican	Thomas R. "Tom" Mattison	7,008	28.16%
Libertarian	Stephen Shepherd	639	2.57%
Total votes		24,889	100%
Democratic hold			

==== District 8 ====
Incumbent Democrat John Kerr has represented the 8th district since 1993.

North Carolina Senate 8th district general election, 2000
Party	Candidate	Votes	%
Democratic	John Kerr (incumbent)	26,283	60.72%
Republican	Ed Wharton	17,001	39.28%
Total votes		43,284	100%
Democratic hold			

==== District 9 ====
Incumbent Democrat Edward Warren has represented the 9th district since 1991.

North Carolina Senate 9th district general election, 2000
Party	Candidate	Votes	%
Democratic	Edward Warren (incumbent)	34,721	61.86%
Republican	A. A. "Dick" Adams	21,407	38.14%
Total votes		56,128	100%
Democratic hold			

==== District 10 ====
Incumbent Democratic Senate Majority Leader Roy Cooper has represented the 10th district since 1991. Cooper retired to run for Attorney General. Democrat A. B. Swindell won the open seat.

North Carolina Senate 10th district general election, 2000
Party	Candidate	Votes	%
Democratic	A. B. Swindell	27,757	55.26%
Republican	Rick Horner	22,477	44.75%
Total votes		50,234	100%
Democratic hold			

==== District 11 ====
Incumbent Democrat Allen Wellons has represented the 11th district since 1997.

North Carolina Senate 11th district general election, 2000
Party	Candidate	Votes	%
Democratic	Allen Wellons (incumbent)	32,372	53.72%
Republican	John S. Shallcross Jr.	27,886	46.28%
Total votes		60,258	100%
Democratic hold			

==== District 12 ====
Incumbent Republican Virginia Foxx, who has represented the 12th district since 1995, was re-elected. Incumbent Republican Don W. East, who has represented the 12th district since 1995, retired. Republican Phil Berger won the open seat.

North Carolina Senate 12th district general election, 2000
Party	Candidate	Votes	%
Republican	Virginia Foxx (incumbent)	65,128	32.25%
Republican	Phil Berger	58,021	28.73%
Democratic	Al Wheeler	40,934	20.27%
Democratic	Vel Pierce	37,867	18.75%
Total votes		201,950	100%
Republican hold			
Republican hold			

==== District 13 ====
Incumbent Democrats Wib Gulley and Jeanne Hopkins Lucas, who have both represented the 13th district since 1993, were re-elected.

North Carolina Senate 13th district general election, 2000
Party	Candidate	Votes	%
Democratic	Wib Gulley (incumbent)	82,509	37.54%
Democratic	Jeanne Hopkins Lucas (incumbent)	76,064	34.61%
Republican	Wallace Bradsher	52,113	23.71%
Libertarian	Sean Haugh	9,102	4.14%
Total votes		219,788	100%
Democratic hold			
Democratic hold			

==== District 14 ====
Incumbent Democrats Brad Miller and Eric Miller Reeves, who have both represented the 14th district since 1997, were re-elected.

North Carolina Senate 14th district general election, 2000
Party	Candidate	Votes	%
Democratic	Brad Miller (incumbent)	79,871	38.53%
Democratic	Eric Miller Reeves (incumbent)	65,816	31.75%
Republican	John W. Bryant	61,599	29.72%
Total votes		207,286	100%
Democratic hold			
Democratic hold			

==== District 15 ====
Incumbent Democrat Oscar Harris has represented the 15th district since 1999.

North Carolina Senate 15th district general election, 2000
Party	Candidate	Votes	%
Democratic	Oscar Harris (incumbent)	30,148	61.15%
Republican	John Hairr	19,154	38.85%
Total votes		49,302	100%
Democratic hold			

==== District 16 ====
Incumbent Democrats Eleanor Kinnaird and Howard Lee have both represented the 16th district since 1997.

North Carolina Senate 16th district general election, 2000
Party	Candidate	Votes	%
Democratic	Eleanor Kinnaird (incumbent)	68,346	27.09%
Democratic	Howard Lee (incumbent)	65,167	25.83%
Republican	William T. "Bill" Boyd	60,222	23.87%
Republican	Vickie Hargrove	58,561	23.21%
Total votes		252,296	100%
Democratic hold			
Democratic hold			

==== District 17 ====
Incumbent Democrat Aaron Plyler, who has represented the 17th district since 1983, was re-elected. Incumbent Democrat William R. Purcell, who has represented the 17th district since 1997, was also re-elected.

North Carolina Senate 17th district general election, 2000
Party	Candidate	Votes	%
Democratic	Aaron Plyler (incumbent)	57,678	27.84%
Democratic	William R. Purcell (incumbent)	51,316	24.77%
Republican	William P. "Bill" Davis	48,350	23.33%
Republican	Eddie Goodall	47,427	22.89%
Libertarian	Alan Light	2,438	1.18%
Total votes		207,209	100%
Democratic hold			
Democratic hold			

==== District 18 ====
Incumbent Democrat R. C. Soles Jr. has represented the 18th district and its predecessors since 1977.

North Carolina Senate 18th district general election, 2000
Party	Candidate	Votes	%
Democratic	R. C. Soles Jr. (incumbent)	39,389	79.52%
Libertarian	John Evans	10,147	20.48%
Total votes		49,536	100%
Democratic hold			

==== District 19 ====
Incumbent Republican Robert G. "Bob" Shaw has represented the 19th district since 1985.

North Carolina Senate 19th district general election, 2000
Party	Candidate	Votes	%
Republican	Robert G. "Bob" Shaw (incumbent)	58,838	100%
Total votes		58,838	100%
Republican hold			

==== District 20 ====
Incumbent Democrat Linda Garrou, aho has represented the 20th district since 1999, was re-elected. Incumbent Republican Hamilton Horton Jr., who has represented the 20th district since 1995, was also re-elected.

North Carolina Senate 20th district general election, 2000
Party	Candidate	Votes	%
Democratic	Linda Garrou (incumbent)	60,149	35.65%
Republican	Hamilton Horton Jr. (incumbent)	59,929	35.52%
Republican	Jeannie A. Metcalf	48,666	28.84%
Total votes		168,744	100%
Democratic hold			
Republican hold			

==== District 21 ====
Incumbent Republican Hugh Webster has represented the 21st district since 1995.

North Carolina Senate 21st district general election, 2000
Party	Candidate	Votes	%
Republican	Hugh Webster (incumbent)	31,994	55.54%
Democratic	Wiley P. Wooten	25,617	44.47%
Total votes		57,611	100%
Republican hold			

=== Districts 22–42 ===
==== District 22 ====
Incumbent Republican Fletcher L. Hartsell Jr. has represented the 22nd district since 1991.

North Carolina Senate 22nd district general election, 2000
Party	Candidate	Votes	%
Republican	Fletcher L. Hartsell Jr. (incumbent)	48,592	100%
Total votes		48,592	100%
Republican hold			

==== District 23 ====
Incumbent Democrat Jim Phillips Sr., who has represented the 23rd district since 1997, retired. Democrat Cal Cunningham won the open seat.

North Carolina Senate 23rd district general election, 2000
Party	Candidate	Votes	%
Democratic	Cal Cunningham	27,726	53.37%
Republican	John "Scott" Keadle	23,095	44.45%
Libertarian	Lawrence James Clark	1,131	2.18%
Total votes		51,952	100%
Democratic hold			

==== District 24 ====
Incumbent Democrat Tony Rand has represented the 24th district since 1995.

North Carolina Senate 24th district general election, 2000
Party	Candidate	Votes	%
Democratic	Tony Rand (incumbent)	28,732	59.10%
Republican	Lois Kirby	19,887	40.90%
Total votes		48,619	100%
Democratic hold			

==== District 25 ====
Incumbent Democrat David W. Hoyle has represented the 25th district since 1993.

North Carolina Senate 25th district general election, 2000
Party	Candidate	Votes	%
Democratic	David W. Hoyle (incumbent)	29,337	100%
Total votes		29,337	100%
Democratic hold			

==== District 26 ====
Incumbent Republican Austin M. Allran has represented the 26th district since 1987.

North Carolina Senate 26th district general election, 2000
Party	Candidate	Votes	%
Republican	Austin M. Allran (incumbent)	44,328	100%
Total votes		44,328	100%
Republican hold			

==== District 27 ====
Incumbent Republicans Kenneth Moore and John Garwood have both represented the 27th district since 1997.

North Carolina Senate 27th district general election, 2000
Party	Candidate	Votes	%
Republican	Kenneth Moore (incumbent)	71,111	51.57%
Republican	John Garwood (incumbent)	66,771	48.43%
Total votes		137,882	100%
Republican hold			
Republican hold			

==== District 28 ====
Incumbent Democrats Steve Metcalf and Charles Newell Carter have both represented the 28th district since 1999.

North Carolina Senate 28th district general election, 2000
Party	Candidate	Votes	%
Democratic	Steve Metcalf (incumbent)	62,571	27.17%
Democratic	Charles Newell Carter (incumbent)	60,691	26.35%
Republican	Jesse I. Ledbetter	52,469	22.78%
Republican	R. L. Clark	50,702	22.01%
Libertarian	Clarence Young	3,903	1.69%
Total votes		230,336	100%
Democratic hold			
Democratic hold			

==== District 29 ====
Incumbent Democrat Dan Robinson has represented the 29th district since 1999.

North Carolina Senate 29th district general election, 2000
Party	Candidate	Votes	%
Democratic	Dan Robinson (incumbent)	31,633	51.33%
Republican	Judith C. Fraser	29,991	48.67%
Total votes		61,624	100%
Democratic hold			

==== District 30 ====
Incumbent Democrat David Weinstein has represented the 30th district since 1997.

North Carolina Senate 30th district general election, 2000
Party	Candidate	Votes	%
Democratic	David Weinstein (incumbent)	31,062	79.12%
Republican	John Rim	8,196	20.88%
Total votes		39,258	100%
Democratic hold			

==== District 31 ====
Incumbent Democrat Bill Martin has represented the 31st district since 1983.

North Carolina Senate 31st district general election, 2000
Party	Candidate	Votes	%
Democratic	Bill Martin (incumbent)	35,519	100%
Total votes		35,519	100%
Democratic hold			

==== District 32 ====
Incumbent Democrat Kay Hagan has represented the 32nd district since 1999.

North Carolina Senate 32nd district general election, 2000
Party	Candidate	Votes	%
Democratic	Kay Hagan (incumbent)	34,353	61.51%
Republican	Wendell H. Sawyer	21,498	38.49%
Total votes		55,851	100%
Democratic hold			

==== District 33 ====
Incumbent Democrat Charlie Dannelly has represented the 33rd district since 1995.

North Carolina Senate 33rd district general election, 2000
Party	Candidate	Votes	%
Democratic	Charlie Dannelly (incumbent)	30,682	100%
Total votes		30,682	100%
Democratic hold			

==== District 34 ====
Incumbent Democrat T. L. "Fountain" Odom has represented the 34th district since 1989.

North Carolina Senate 34th district general election, 2000
Party	Candidate	Votes	%
Democratic	T. L. "Fountain" Odom (incumbent)	46,682	56.17%
Republican	Jeffrey Ober	36,430	43.83%
Total votes		83,112	100%
Democratic hold			

==== District 35 ====
Incumbent Republican Bob Rucho has represented the 35th district since 1997.

North Carolina Senate 35th district general election, 2000
Party	Candidate	Votes	%
Republican	Bob Rucho (incumbent)	55,295	66.78%
Democratic	David Allen	27,511	33.22%
Total votes		82,806	100%
Republican hold			

==== District 36 ====
Incumbent Republican John Carrington has represented the 36th district since 1995.

North Carolina Senate 36th district general election, 2000
Party	Candidate	Votes	%
Republican	John Carrington (incumbent)	56,010	55.90%
Democratic	James C. Crew	44,181	44.10%
Total votes		100,191	100%
Republican hold			

==== District 37 ====
Incumbent Democrat Walter Dalton has represented the 37th district since 1997.

North Carolina Senate 37th district general election, 2000
Party	Candidate	Votes	%
Democratic	Walter Dalton (incumbent)	26,374	54.76%
Republican	Scott Neisler	21,792	45.24%
Total votes		48,166	100%
Democratic hold			

==== District 38 ====
Incumbent Republican Betsy Lane Cochrane has represented the 38th district since 1989. Cochrane retired to run for Lieutenant Governor. Republican Stan Bingham won the open seat.

North Carolina Senate 38th district general election, 2000
Party	Candidate	Votes	%
Republican	Stan Bingham	45,880	88.94%
Libertarian	Michael G. Smith	5,703	11.06%
Total votes		51,583	100%
Republican hold			

==== District 39 ====
Incumbent Republican James Forrester has represented the 39th district since 1991.

North Carolina Senate 39th district general election, 2000
Party	Candidate	Votes	%
Republican	James Forrester (incumbent)	45,529	100%
Total votes		45,529	100%
Republican hold			

==== District 40 ====
Incumbent Democrat Dan Clodfelter has represented the 40th district since 1999.

North Carolina Senate 40th district general election, 2000
Party	Candidate	Votes	%
Democratic	Dan Clodfelter (incumbent)	28,118	63.82%
Republican	Wayne Johnson	15,943	36.18%
Total votes		44,061	100%
Democratic hold			

==== District 41 ====
Incumbent Democrat Larry Shaw has represented the 41st district since 1997.

North Carolina Senate 41st district general election, 2000
Party	Candidate	Votes	%
Democratic	Larry Shaw (incumbent)	20,392	100%
Total votes		20,392	100%
Democratic hold			

==== District 42 ====
Incumbent Republican Bob Carpenter has represented the 42nd district and its predecessors since 1989.

North Carolina Senate 42nd district general election, 2000
Party	Candidate	Votes	%
Republican	Bob Carpenter (incumbent)	52,299	90.04%
Libertarian	Larry R. Gavel	5,788	9.96%
Total votes		58,087	100%
Republican hold			

== See also ==
- List of North Carolina state legislatures
