= Benton Sawrey =

American politician (born 1987)

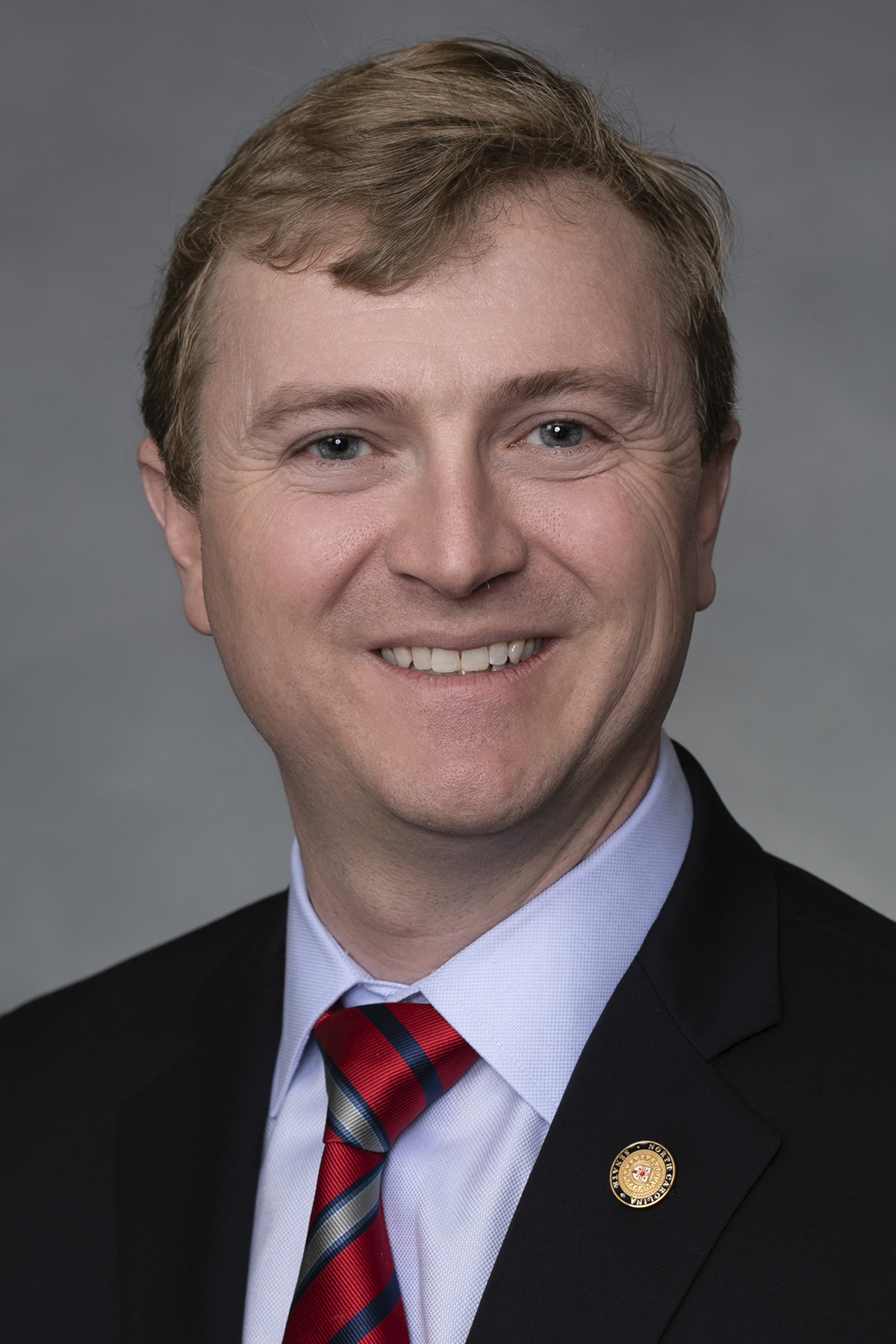

Member of the North Carolina Senate from the 10th district
- Incumbent
- Assumed office January 1, 2023
- Preceded by: Constituency established

Personal details
- Born: Benton G. Sawrey; January 20, 1987 (age 39) Smithfield, North Carolina, U.S.
- Party: Republican
- Spouse: Beth
- Children: 2
- Education: North Carolina State University (BA); University of South Carolina (JD)

Benton G. Sawrey (born January 20, 1987) is an American politician. A member of the Republican Party, Sawrey has served since 2023 as a member of the North Carolina Senate, representing the 10th district.

== Early life ==
Born in Smithfield, North Carolina, Sawrey graduated from North Carolina State University and the University of South Carolina School of Law. Sawrey is a partner with the law firm Narron Wenzel, P.A.

Prior to his election to the North Carolina Senate, Sawrey served on the board of trustees at Johnston Community College. He was appointed to the college's board in 2015 by Governor Pat McCrory and re-appointed in 2019 by the Johnston County Board of Education.

== North Carolina Senate ==
Sawrey was elected to the open seat in the redistricted North Carolina Senate District 10 following the 2020 census and assumed office on January 1, 2023. He defeated Jill Homan and Matt Ansley in the Republican primary and then defeated Democrat Dr. Gettys Cohen Jr. in the general election.

Sawrey was the primary sponsor of the SCRIPT Act, which was signed into law by Governor Josh Stein on July 9, 2025, and reforms prescription drug pricing and pharmacy benefit manager practices in North Carolina. In 2026, he voted for House Bill 958 which reduced early voting periods from 17 days to 10 days. Sawrey has spoken about the need to reform North Carolina's certificate-of-need laws and has introduced legislation that would repeal certificate-of-need requirements for health care facilities in the state. Sawrey was appointed by Governor Josh Stein to serve on the Health Care Affordability Commission.

=== Committee assignments ===
- Appropriations on Health and Human Services (chairman)
- Appropriations/Base Budget
- Elections
- Health Care (chairman)
- Judiciary
- Rules and Operations of the Senate
- Select Committee on Property Tax Reform

== Election results ==
=== 2026 ===
North Carolina Senate 10th district Republican primary election, 2026
| Party | Candidate | Votes | % |
|---|---|---|---|
| Republican | Benton Sawrey (incumbent) | 14,903 | 84.85% |
| Republican | Caitlin Marsh | 2,661 | 15.15% |
| Total votes | | 17,564 | 100% |

North Carolina Senate 10th district general election, 2026
| Party | Candidate | Votes | % |
|---|---|---|---|
| Republican | Benton Sawrey (incumbent) | 44,010 | 49.63% |
| Democratic | Pat LeGrand | 42,874 | 48.35% |
| Libertarian | Kevin Terrett | 1,790 | 2.02% |
| Total votes | | | 100% |

=== 2024 ===
North Carolina Senate 10th district general election, 2024
| Party | Candidate | Votes | % |
|---|---|---|---|
| Republican | Benton Sawrey (incumbent) | 70,773 | 58.75% |
| Democratic | Felicia C. Baxter | 45,346 | 37.64% |
| Libertarian | Christopher Sessions | 4,351 | 3.61% |
| Total votes | | 120,470 | 100% |
| Republican hold | | | |

=== 2022 ===
North Carolina Senate 10th district Republican primary election, 2022
| Party | Candidate | Votes | % |
|---|---|---|---|
| Republican | Benton Sawrey | 12,318 | 65.60% |
| Republican | Jill Homan | 3,279 | 19.86% |
| Republican | Matt Ansley | 2,730 | 14.54% |
| Total votes | | 18,777 | 100% |

North Carolina Senate 10th district general election, 2022
| Party | Candidate | Votes | % |
|---|---|---|---|
| Republican | Benton Sawrey | 48,083 | 63.90% |
| Democratic | Gettys Cohen Jr. | 27,165 | 36.10% |
| Total votes | | 75,248 | 100% |
| Republican win (new seat) | | | |

=== 2016 ===
North Carolina Senate 11th district Republican primary election, 2016
| Party | Candidate | Votes | % |
|---|---|---|---|
| Republican | Rick Horner | 11,509 | 51.62% |
| Republican | Benton Sawrey | 10,785 | 48.38% |
| Total votes | | 22,294 | 100% |

== Personal life ==
Sawrey lives in Clayton, North Carolina, with his wife and two children.

North Carolina Senate
| Preceded by Brent Jackson | Member of the North Carolina Senate from the 10th district 2023–Present | Incumbent |
