= Mark Speed =

American politician from North Carolina

Member-elect of the North Carolina House of Representatives from the 7th district
- Assuming office January 1, 2027
- Succeeding: Matthew Winslow

Member of the Franklin County Board of Commissioners from the 3rd district
- Incumbent
- Assumed office June 26, 2017
- Preceded by: John May

Personal details
- Born: James Mark Speed Franklin County, North Carolina
- Party: Democratic
- Spouse: Camille Speed
- Relations: James Davis Speed (father)
- Occupation: Farmer, disc jockey

James Mark Speed is an American farmer and politician who is a member-elect of the North Carolina House of Representatives from the 7th district. A Democrat, he has served as a Franklin County commissioner since 2017.

== Early life and career ==
A Franklin County native, Speed is a fourth-generation cattle and timber farmer and has also worked as a disc jockey for about 25 years. His grandfather served on the Franklin County Board of Commissioners in the 1920s, and his father, James Davis Speed, served in the North Carolina General Assembly for more than 30 years. Speed and his wife, Camille, live in Louisburg and are members of a Baptist church.

== Political career ==
Speed was appointed to the Franklin County Board of Commissioners in 2017. He ran for the North Carolina Senate from the 11th district in 2022, losing to Republican incumbent Lisa Stone Barnes with 45.15 percent of the vote.

In 2026, Speed ran for the 7th House district seat held by retiring Republican Matthew Winslow, facing Republican Cory Thornton. He opposes data centers, citing their potential environmental effects among other concerns. He won with 51.62 percent of the vote.

== Electoral history ==
=== 2026 ===
North Carolina House of Representatives 7th district general election, 2026
| Party | Candidate | Votes | % |
|---|---|---|---|
| Democratic | Mark Speed | 19,997 | 51.62% |
| Republican | Cory Thornton | 18,744 | 48.38% |
| Total votes | | 38,741 | 100% |
| Democratic gain from Republican | | | |

=== 2024 ===
Franklin County Board of Commissioners 3rd district general election, 2024
| Party | Candidate | Votes | % |
|---|---|---|---|
| Democratic | Mark Speed (incumbent) | 3,716 | 50.56% |
| Republican | Russell Bottoms | 3,633 | 49.44% |
| Total votes | | 7,349 | 100% |
| Democratic hold | | | |

=== 2022 ===
North Carolina Senate 11th district general election, 2022
| Party | Candidate | Votes | % |
|---|---|---|---|
| Republican | Lisa Stone Barnes (incumbent) | 41,701 | 54.85% |
| Democratic | Mark Speed | 34,333 | 45.15% |
| Total votes | | 76,034 | 100% |
| Republican hold | | | |

=== 2020 ===
Franklin County Board of Commissioners 3rd district general election, 2020
| Party | Candidate | Votes | % |
|---|---|---|---|
| Democratic | Mark Speed (incumbent) | 3,120 | 53.95% |
| Republican | Jeremy Neal | 2,663 | 46.05% |
| Total votes | | 5,783 | 100% |
| Democratic hold | | | |

=== 2018 ===
Franklin County Board of Commissioners 3rd district special Democratic primary election, 2018
| Party | Candidate | Votes | % |
|---|---|---|---|
| Democratic | Mark Speed (incumbent) | 602 | 61.05% |
| Democratic | Glenn Swanson | 384 | 38.95% |
| Total votes | | 986 | 100% |

Franklin County Board of Commissioners 3rd district special election, 2018
| Party | Candidate | Votes | % |
|---|---|---|---|
| Democratic | Mark Speed (incumbent) | 3,366 | 100% |
| Total votes | | 3,366 | 100% |
| Democratic hold | | | |

North Carolina House of Representatives
| Preceded by Matthew Winslow | Member-elect of the North Carolina House of Representatives from the 7th district Taking office January 1, 2027 | Succeeded by TBD |
