= North Carolina's 11th Senate district =

American legislative district

North Carolina's 11th State Senate district
Senator
| Lisa Stone Barnes; R–Spring Hope |
- Demographics: 50% White; 36% Black; 9% Hispanic; 1% Asian; 3% Multiracial
- Population (2023): 209,774

North Carolina's 11th Senate district is one of 50 districts in the North Carolina Senate. It has been represented by Republican Lisa Stone Barnes since 2021.

== Geography ==
Since 2023, the district has included all of Nash, Franklin, and Vance counties. The district overlaps with the 7th, 24th, 25th, and 32nd state house districts.

== District officeholders since 1973 ==
| Senator | Party | Dates | Notes | Counties |
|---|---|---|---|---|
| Arthur Williamson (Chadbourn) | Democratic | January 1, 1973 – January 1, 1975 | | 1973–1983; All of Bladen, Columbus, and Brunswick counties. |
| Edd Nye (Elizabethtown) | Democratic | January 1, 1975 – January 1, 1977 | Retired to run for state house. | 1973–1983; All of Bladen, Columbus, and Brunswick counties. |
| R. C. Soles Jr. (Tabor City) | Democratic | January 1, 1977 – January 1, 1983 | Redistricted to the 18th district. | 1973–1983; All of Bladen, Columbus, and Brunswick counties. |
| James Davis Speed (Louisburg) | Democratic | January 1, 1983 – January 1, 1997 | Redistricted from the 7th district. Retired. | 1983–1985; All of Vance and Franklin counties. Parts of Nash and Wake counties. |
| James Davis Speed (Louisburg) | Democratic | January 1, 1983 – January 1, 1997 | Redistricted from the 7th district. Retired. | 1985–1993; All of Vance and Franklin counties. Part of Wake County. |
| James Davis Speed (Louisburg) | Democratic | January 1, 1983 – January 1, 1997 | Redistricted from the 7th district. Retired. | 1993–2003; All of Franklin County. Parts of Vance, Johnston, and Wilson counties. |
| Allen Wellons (Smithfield) | Democratic | January 1, 1997 – January 1, 2003 | Redistricted to the 12th district and lost re-election. | 1993–2003; All of Franklin County. Parts of Vance, Johnston, and Wilson counties. |
| A. B. Swindell (Nashville) | Democratic | January 1, 2003 – January 1, 2011 | Redistricted from the 10th district. Lost re-election. | 2003–2005; All of Nash and Franklin counties. Part of Vance County. |
| A. B. Swindell (Nashville) | Democratic | January 1, 2003 – January 1, 2011 | Redistricted from the 10th district. Lost re-election. | 2005–2013; All of Nash and Wilson counties. |
| Buck Newton (Wilson) | Republican | January 1, 2011 – January 1, 2017 | Retired to run for Attorney General. | 2005–2013; All of Nash and Wilson counties. |
| Buck Newton (Wilson) | Republican | January 1, 2011 – January 1, 2017 | Retired to run for Attorney General. | 2013–2019; Parts of Nash, Wilson, and Johnston counties. |
| Rick Horner (Bailey) | Republican | January 1, 2017 – January 1, 2021 | Retired. | 2013–2019; Parts of Nash, Wilson, and Johnston counties. |
| Rick Horner (Bailey) | Republican | January 1, 2017 – January 1, 2021 | Retired. | 2019–2023; All of Nash County. Part of Johnston County. |
| Lisa Stone Barnes (Spring Hope) | Republican | January 1, 2021 – Present | | 2019–2023; All of Nash County. Part of Johnston County. |
| Lisa Stone Barnes (Spring Hope) | Republican | January 1, 2021 – Present | | 2023–Present; All of Nash, Franklin, and Vance counties. |

== Election results ==
=== 2024 ===
North Carolina Senate 11th district general election, 2024
| Party | Candidate | Votes | % |
|---|---|---|---|
| Republican | Lisa Stone Barnes (incumbent) | 57,713 | 51.29% |
| Democratic | James Mercer | 54,806 | 48.71% |
| Total votes | | 112,519 | 100% |
| Republican hold | | | |

=== 2022 ===
North Carolina Senate 11th district general election, 2022
| Party | Candidate | Votes | % |
|---|---|---|---|
| Republican | Lisa Stone Barnes (incumbent) | 41,701 | 54.85% |
| Democratic | Mark Speed | 34,333 | 45.15% |
| Total votes | | 76,034 | 100% |
| Republican hold | | | |

=== 2020 ===
North Carolina Senate 11th district Democratic primary election, 2020
| Party | Candidate | Votes | % |
|---|---|---|---|
| Democratic | Allen Wellons | 12,553 | 60.58% |
| Democratic | Albert R. Pacer | 8,168 | 39.42% |
| Total votes | | 20,721 | 100% |

North Carolina Senate 11th district Republican primary election, 2020
| Party | Candidate | Votes | % |
|---|---|---|---|
| Republican | Lisa Stone Barnes | 12,611 | 68.08% |
| Republican | Patrick Harris | 5,298 | 28.60% |
| Republican | Dennis Nielsen | 616 | 3.33% |
| Total votes | | 18,525 | 100% |

North Carolina Senate 11th district general election, 2020
| Party | Candidate | Votes | % |
|---|---|---|---|
| Republican | Lisa Stone Barnes | 61,287 | 54.98% |
| Democratic | Allen Wellons | 50,193 | 45.02% |
| Total votes | | 111,479 | 100% |
| Republican hold | | | |

=== 2018 ===
North Carolina Senate 11th district general election, 2018
| Party | Candidate | Votes | % |
|---|---|---|---|
| Republican | Rick Horner (incumbent) | 45,768 | 56.49% |
| Democratic | Albert R. Pacer | 35,258 | 43.51% |
| Total votes | | 81,026 | 100% |
| Republican hold | | | |

=== 2016 ===
North Carolina Senate 11th district Republican primary election, 2016
| Party | Candidate | Votes | % |
|---|---|---|---|
| Republican | Rick Horner | 11,509 | 51.62% |
| Republican | Benton Sawrey | 10,785 | 48.38% |
| Total votes | | 22,294 | 100% |

North Carolina Senate 11th district general election, 2016
| Party | Candidate | Votes | % |
|---|---|---|---|
| Republican | Rick Horner | 55,765 | 61.17% |
| Democratic | Albert Pacer | 35,394 | 38.83% |
| Total votes | | 91,159 | 100% |
| Republican hold | | | |

=== 2014 ===
North Carolina Senate 11th district general election, 2014
| Party | Candidate | Votes | % |
|---|---|---|---|
| Republican | Buck Newton (incumbent) | 42,364 | 100% |
| Total votes | | 42,364 | 100% |
| Republican hold | | | |

=== 2012 ===
North Carolina Senate 11th district Republican primary election, 2012
| Party | Candidate | Votes | % |
|---|---|---|---|
| Republican | Buck Newton (incumbent) | 14,344 | 80.49% |
| Republican | Dennis Nielsen | 3,477 | 19.51% |
| Total votes | | 17,821 | 100% |

North Carolina Senate 11th district general election, 2012
| Party | Candidate | Votes | % |
|---|---|---|---|
| Republican | Buck Newton (incumbent) | 53,127 | 60.77% |
| Democratic | Clarence A. Bender | 34,291 | 39.23% |
| Total votes | | 87,418 | 100% |
| Republican hold | | | |

=== 2010 ===
North Carolina Senate 11th district Democratic primary election, 2010
| Party | Candidate | Votes | % |
|---|---|---|---|
| Democratic | A.B. Swindell (incumbent) | 11,721 | 73.49% |
| Democratic | Dennis Nielsen | 4,229 | 26.51% |
| Total votes | | 15,950 | 100% |

North Carolina Senate 11th district Republican primary election, 2010
| Party | Candidate | Votes | % |
|---|---|---|---|
| Republican | Buck Newton | 2,568 | 58.54% |
| Republican | Randy J. Johnson | 1,008 | 22.98% |
| Republican | Donnie Weaver | 811 | 18.49% |
| Total votes | | 4,387 | 100% |

North Carolina Senate 11th district general election, 2010
| Party | Candidate | Votes | % |
|---|---|---|---|
| Republican | Buck Newton | 30,266 | 52.88% |
| Democratic | A.B. Swindell (incumbent) | 26,970 | 47.12% |
| Total votes | | 57,236 | 100% |
| Republican gain from Democratic | | | |

=== 2008 ===
North Carolina Senate 11th district general election, 2008
| Party | Candidate | Votes | % |
|---|---|---|---|
| Democratic | A. B. Swindell (incumbent) | 59,461 | 100% |
| Total votes | | 59,461 | 100% |
| Democratic hold | | | |

=== 2006 ===
North Carolina Senate 11th district general election, 2006
| Party | Candidate | Votes | % |
|---|---|---|---|
| Democratic | A. B. Swindell (incumbent) | 18,900 | 61.63% |
| Republican | Al Lytton | 11,768 | 38.37% |
| Total votes | | 30,668 | 100% |
| Democratic hold | | | |

=== 2004 ===
North Carolina Senate 11th district general election, 2004
| Party | Candidate | Votes | % |
|---|---|---|---|
| Democratic | A. B. Swindell (incumbent) | 40,234 | 60.37% |
| Republican | Dennis Nielsen | 26,417 | 39.63% |
| Total votes | | 66,651 | 100% |
| Democratic hold | | | |

=== 2002 ===
North Carolina Senate 11th district general election, 2002
| Party | Candidate | Votes | % |
|---|---|---|---|
| Democratic | A. B. Swindell (incumbent) | 26,471 | 60.13% |
| Republican | Willie Cooke | 16,636 | 37.79% |
| Libertarian | Charles Yow | 914 | 2.08% |
| Total votes | | 44,021 | 100% |
| Democratic hold | | | |

=== 2000 ===
North Carolina Senate 11th district general election, 2000
| Party | Candidate | Votes | % |
|---|---|---|---|
| Democratic | Allen Wellons (incumbent) | 32,372 | 53.72% |
| Republican | John S. Shallcross Jr. | 27,886 | 46.28% |
| Total votes | | 60,258 | 100% |
| Democratic hold | | | |
