= Buck Newton =

American politician

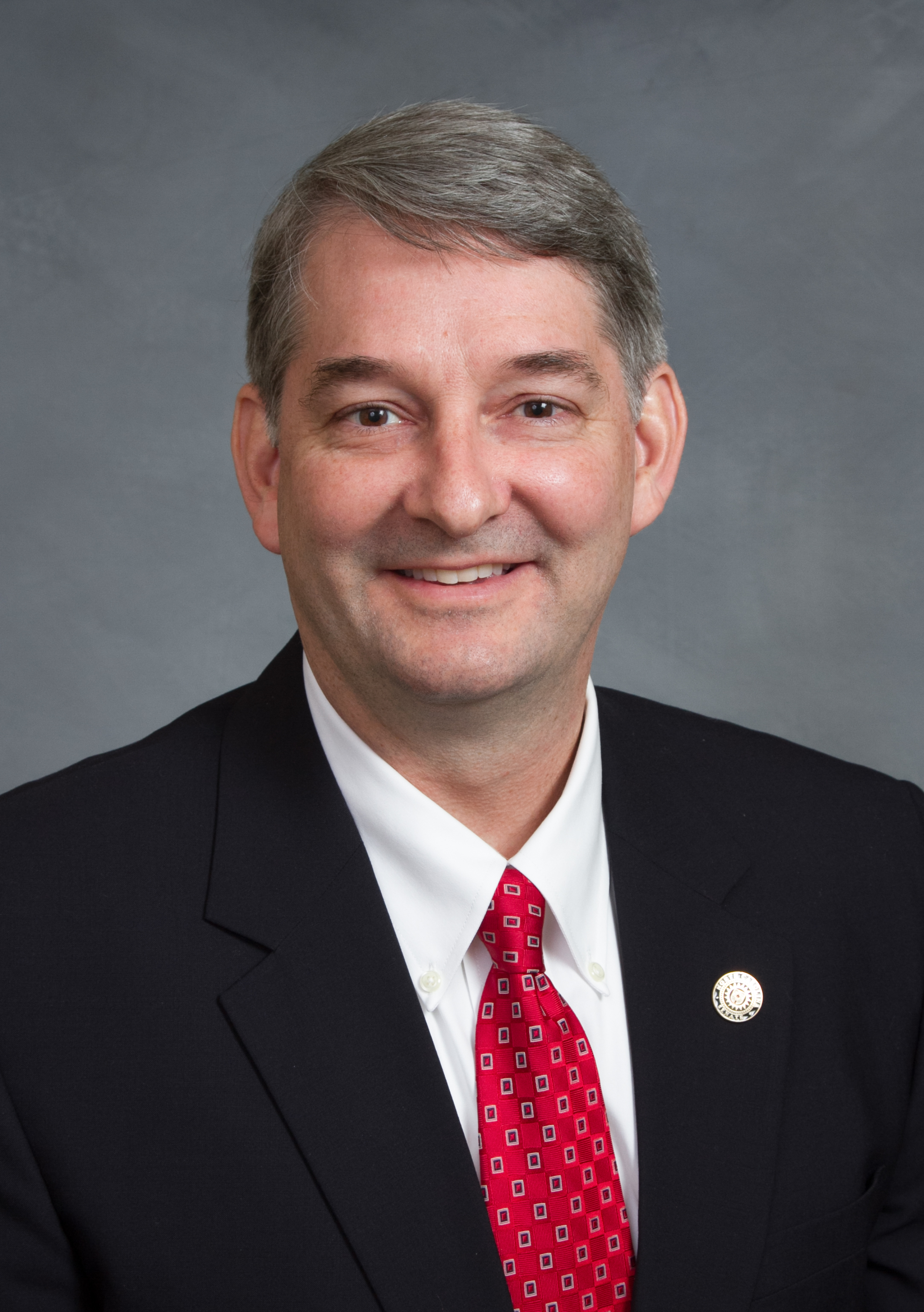
- Official portrait, 2013

Member of the North Carolina Senate from the 4th district
- Incumbent
- Assumed office January 1, 2023
- Preceded by: Toby Fitch

Member of the North Carolina Senate from the 11th district
- In office January 5, 2011 – January 11, 2017
- Preceded by: A. B. Swindell
- Succeeded by: Rick Horner

Personal details
- Born: Eldon Sharpe Newton III; July 5, 1968 (age 58) Wilson, North Carolina, U.S.
- Party: Republican
- Spouse: Hope
- Children: 3
- Education: Appalachian State University (BS); Campbell University (JD)
- Occupation: Attorney

Eldon Sharpe "Buck" Newton III (born July 5, 1968) is an American lawyer and politician who serves as a Republican state senator in the North Carolina General Assembly (the state's legislature) representing N.C. Senate District 4 (Wilson, Greene, and Wayne counties). Newton originally won a seat in the North Carolina Senate in the 2010 election by defeating the Democratic incumbent, Albin B. Swindell.

In 2016, Newton was the Republican nominee for North Carolina Attorney General, losing to Democrat Josh Stein by 25,000 votes, a 0.5% margin.

In 2022, Newton won a seat in North Carolina Senate District 4, defeating incumbent Democrat Toby Fitch by a 16 point margin.

== Early life and education ==
A native of Wilson, North Carolina, Newton graduated from Hunt High School. He received his bachelor's degree in political science from Appalachian State University. After college, Newton was an aide to Senator Jesse Helms on the U.S. Senate Foreign Relations Committee.

Newton is a graduate of the Campbell University School of Law. He has practiced law for 16 years at his firm, Newton and Lee, in Wilson.

== State office ==
Newton defeated A. B. Swindell, a five-term incumbent, in 2010. He has chaired judiciary committees since his first term. In the 2025–2026 session he chairs the Senate committees on the Judiciary, Finance, and Appropriations on Justice and Public Safety, and sits on the committees on Agriculture, Energy and Environment; Education/Higher Education; and Transportation.

From 2007-2011, Newton served as the chairman for the Wilson County Republican Party before taking office in the state capital in early 2011, replacing State Senator Albin B. Swindell.

In response to the state's law on LGBT issues Newton, at a conservative rally supporting North Carolina's House Bill 2 (a.k.a. "HB2"), said “Go home, tell your friends and family who had to work today what this is all about and how hard we must fight to keep our state straight.” In a later interview, Newton said his remarks at the rally were intended to mean “keep men out of the ladies’ room.” Newton has also said that "folks that wave the rainbow flags” need to get used to “the way things have always been in this state.”

In 2015 Newton supported a bill allowing magistrates and county employees to opt out of performing same-sex marriages, which passed the legislature and was vetoed by Governor Pat McCrory. He was also a principal sponsor of legislation that moved oversight of the North Carolina State Bureau of Investigation out of the Attorney General's office into an independent agency whose director is appointed by the governor.

Newton ran as the Republican candidate for the North Carolina Attorney General election in 2016, but lost to Josh Stein, the Democratic nominee.

He was elected to the State Senate again in 2022, defeating incumbent Senator Toby Fitch.

In 2024, Newton sponsored the Senate committee substitute for House Bill 237, the Unmasking Mobs and Criminals Act, which would have repealed a pandemic-era exemption permitting masks to be worn in public for health reasons. Newton said the measure restored the law to its form before the COVID-19 pandemic and would criminalise masks only when worn to conceal identity, while opponents argued it would expose immunocompromised people to prosecution; legislative staff advised a Senate committee that masking for health purposes would violate the bill as drafted. It passed the Senate 30–15 on party lines in May 2024. The House declined to concur, and a conference committee restored an exemption for health reasons. As enacted, the law exempts a person wearing a medical or surgical grade mask to prevent the spread of contagious disease, a narrower exemption than the one it replaced, and requires its removal on request by a law enforcement officer. Governor Roy Cooper vetoed the bill, and it became law over his objections on June 27, 2024.

Party political offices
| Vacant Title last held by Bob Crumley | Republican nominee for Attorney General of North Carolina; 2016 | Succeeded by Jim O'Neill |
North Carolina Senate
| Preceded by A. B. Swindell | Member of the North Carolina Senate from the 11th district 2011–2017 | Succeeded by Rick Horner |
| Preceded by Toby Fitch | Member of the North Carolina Senate from the 4th district 2023–present | Incumbent |
