= Charles W. Albertson =

American politician and musician

Charlie Albertson

Member of the North Carolina Senate
- In office January 1, 1993 – January 1, 2011
- Preceded by: Wendell Murphy
- Succeeded by: Brent Jackson
- Constituency: 5th District (1993-2003); 10th District (2003-2011)

Member of the North Carolina House of Representatives from the 10th district
- In office January 1, 1989 – January 1, 1993
- Preceded by: Wendell Murphy
- Succeeded by: Vance Alphin

Personal details
- Born: January 4, 1932 (age 94) Beulaville, North Carolina, U.S.
- Party: Democratic
- Spouse: Grace Sholar (m. 1953)
- Children: 2
- Education: James Sprunt Community College
- Profession: Farmer; musician; politician; singer-songwriter

Military service
- Branch/service: United States Air Force
- Years of service: 1951–1952
- Rank: Airman first class
- Musical career
- Genres: Country; Country gospel
- Labels: Stop Records; Hilltop Records; Calvary Records; Mega Records; First Colony Records
- Website: charliealbertson.com

Charles W. "Charlie" Albertson (born January 4, 1932) is an American politician and musician. A Democratic politician from North Carolina, he was a member of the North Carolina Senate, representing the 5th and 10th districts from 1993 until his retirement in 2010. His district included constituents in Duplin, Harnett and Sampson counties. Albertson also served as the Democratic Caucus Secretary from 2005 until 2010. He previously served in the North Carolina House of Representatives from 1989 through 1992. He has earned the nickname "The Singing Senator." PBS North Carolina aired a documentary about his life in July 2024 made by Denver Hollingsworth titled "The Singing Senator".

== Early life and education ==
Albertson was born in Beulaville, North Carolina. His parents were James Edward Albertson and the former Mary Elizabeth Norris. He graduated from Beulaville High School in 1950. After graduation he briefly attended James Sprunt Community College and then joined the United States Air Force attaining the rank of Airman First Class. He served in the USAF from 1951 to 1952.

== Political career ==
=== Electoral history ===
Albertson decided to run for the 10th North Carolina House of Representatives district seat in 1988. The open seat was vacated by Wendell Murphy who chose to run for the 5th North Carolina Senate district that year. Albertson defeated Republican farmer and former Duplin County Board of Elections chairman, Johnnie Manning, in the general election. The next election he faced was in 1990 where he was unopposed in both the primary and general elections.

In 1992, Albertson again followed Wendell Murphy when Albertson decided to run for the 5th District of the North Carolina Senate. The Democratic incumbent Murphy decided not to seek re-election. He defeated physician and Duplin County Republican Party chairman Corbett Quinn in the general election. The election of 1996 saw no primary for Albertson. He went on to face a rematch with Corbett Quinn in the general election. Albertson won 54.8% to 45.2%. Again having no primary challenge in 1998, he faced Republican activist and 1996 Republican primary candidate Mary Jo Loftin. He won the general election with just over 64% of the vote. In 2000, the last election in the 5th District before redistricting, Albertson went on to the general election without a primary and faced former state House member Cindy Watson in the general election. Albertson won with 60% of the vote.

In 2002, after redistricting, Albertson's seat became the 10th District. That year he faced a Democratic primary challenge from Robert Bradshaw. Albertson won 70%–30%. He went on to defeat Republican George E. Wilson, 54.5%–45.5%, in the general election. In 2004, Albertson had no primary challengers. He beat marketing executive and former Lenoir County Schools board member, Republican Rich Jarman, in the general election, 62%–38%. He again faced no primary challenge in 2006 and went on to defeat Republican Adrain Arnett in the general election, 64.5%–35.5%. In his last election in 2008, Albertson was unopposed in both the primary and general elections.

=== Legislative history ===
Albertson served in the North Carolina House of Representatives from 1989 until 1992. He then was elected to the North Carolina Senate, serving from 1993 until his retirement in 2010. That year, he decided not to seek re-election.

While in the state Senate, Albertson served as a co-chairman of the Appropriations/Base Budget Committee. He also served in that chamber's party leadership as the Senate Democratic Caucus Secretary from 2005 to 2010. Prior to this, he served as chair of the Committee on Agriculture, Environment and Natural Resources.

== Music career ==
Albertson is a singer-songwriter and musician that has toured in 26 countries. He has also appeared at the Grand Ole Opry. Primarily a country and gospel singer, he has worked with Jimmy Capps and claims Hank Williams, Lefty Frizzell, Ernest Tubb, Roy Acuff, Kitty Wells, and Hank Thompson as influences. He appeared on Arthur Smith's UNC-TV show Carolina Calling.

Albertson toured Iran just before the overthrow of the Shah. He played a couple of shows with Tommy Cash during his career. He performed at many Democratic Party rallies and once wrote the theme song/jingle for the "Goodness Grows in North Carolina" program that the state promoted. In 2010, outraged over the citations in his district of members of Willie Nelson's band (which led to Nelson cancelling a concert there), Albertson wrote and recorded a song called "Leave the Man Alone" criticizing law enforcement for the incident. It received airplay on several country stations.

=== Discography ===
The Charlie Albertson Band

- The Charlie Albertson show : "Dancin' tonight" (LP, First Colony Records, 1990s)
- The Charlie Albertson show : "by Request" (LP, First Colony Records, 1990s)

Solo

- Slow Boat to China (single, Mega Records, 1975)
- He Sure Sings A Good Country Song (LP, Hilltop Production Co., 1974)
- I'm Going to Live for Jesus (LP, Calvary, 1977)
- Honky Tonk Moon (LP, Jimmy Capps/Hilltop Production Co.)
- With The News (LP, First Colony Records)
- Three Little Words: I Thank You (LP, CS Records, 2007)
- I Have Always Loved You (LP)
- Leave the Man Alone (LP)

== Personal life ==
Albertson married to the former Grace Sholar on February 15, 1953; they have two children. Albertson was a farmer and a retired Plant Protection and Quarantine officer with the U.S. Department of Agriculture, as well as a musician, songwriter, and publisher.

He was close friends with former U.S. Representative from North Carolina David N. Henderson.

== Other work ==
Prior to being elected to office, he served various positions on the James Sprunt Community College Foundation and the college's Board of Trustees between 1977 and 1992, becoming chairman of the Trustees, 1986 to 1989.

== Awards ==
Albertson has been recognized by the U.S. Department of Defense with two certificates of esteem for entertaining troops. He was also inducted into the Order of the Long Leaf Pine. Because of his musical and political careers, he gained the nickname "The Singing Senator." In November 2012, he was inducted into the Duplin County Hall of Fame.

He has twice received "Friend of Agriculture" awards. Once from the North Carolina Department of Agriculture in 1996 and once from the North Carolina Agribusiness Council in 2003. He received an honorary induction into North Carolina State University's Gamma Sigma Delta honors society in 2000. The North Carolina Farm Bureau honored Albertson in 2010 with their President's Award of Excellence.

North Carolina House of Representatives
Preceded by Wendell Murphy	Member of the North Carolina House of Representatives from the 10th district 1989–1993	Succeeded by Vance Alphin
North Carolina Senate
Preceded by Wendell Murphy	Member of the North Carolina Senate from the 5th district 1993–2003	Succeeded by Tony Moore
Preceded by A. B. Swindell	Member of the North Carolina Senate from the 10th district 2003–2011	Succeeded by Brent Jackson
