= North Carolina's 10th Senate district =

American legislative district

North Carolina's 10th State Senate district
Senator
Benton Sawrey; R–Clayton
- Demographics: 63% White; 17% Black; 16% Hispanic; 1% Asian; 3% Multiracial
- Population (2023): 226,623

North Carolina's 10th Senate district is one of 50 districts in the North Carolina Senate. It has been represented by Republican Benton Sawrey since 2023.

== Geography ==
Since 2023, the district has included all of Johnston County. The district overlaps with the 26th, 28th and 53rd state house districts.

== District officeholders since 1973 ==
=== Multi-member district ===
Senator	Party	Dates	Notes	Senator	Party	Dates	Notes	Counties
John Henley (Hope Mills)	Democratic	January 1, 1973 – January 1, 1981	Redistricted from the 14th district.	Joseph Raynor Jr. (Fayetteville)	Democratic	January 1, 1973 – January 1, 1975		1973–1983; All of Cumberland County.
John Henley (Hope Mills)	Democratic	January 1, 1973 – January 1, 1981	Redistricted from the 14th district.	Glenn Jernigan (Fayetteville)	Democratic	January 1, 1975 – January 1, 1977		1973–1983; All of Cumberland County.
John Henley (Hope Mills)	Democratic	January 1, 1973 – January 1, 1981	Redistricted from the 14th district.	Joseph Raynor Jr. (Fayetteville)	Democratic	January 1, 1977 – January 1, 1983		1973–1983; All of Cumberland County.
Glenn Jernigan (Fayetteville)	Democratic	January 1, 1981 – January 1, 1983		Joseph Raynor Jr. (Fayetteville)	Democratic	January 1, 1977 – January 1, 1983		1973–1983; All of Cumberland County.

=== Single-member district ===
Senator	Party	Dates	Notes	Counties
Dallas Alford Jr. (Rocky Mount)	Democratic	January 1, 1983 – January 1, 1985	Redistricted from the 7th district.	1983–1985; All of Wilson County. Part of Nash County.
Jim Ezzell (Rocky Mount)	Democratic	January 1, 1985 – January 30, 1991	Died.	1985–1993; All of Nash County. Parts of Warren, Halifax, Edgecombe, and Wilson counties.
Vacant		January 30, 1991 - February 21, 1991		1985–1993; All of Nash County. Parts of Warren, Halifax, Edgecombe, and Wilson counties.
Roy Cooper (Rocky Mount)	Democratic	February 21, 1991 – January 1, 2001	Appointed to finish Ezzell's term. Retired to run for Attorney General.	1985–1993; All of Nash County. Parts of Warren, Halifax, Edgecombe, and Wilson counties.
Roy Cooper (Rocky Mount)	Democratic	February 21, 1991 – January 1, 2001	Appointed to finish Ezzell's term. Retired to run for Attorney General.	1993–2003; All of Nash County. Parts of Halifax, Edgecombe, and Wilson counties.
A. B. Swindell (Nashville)	Democratic	January 1, 2001 – January 1, 2003	Redistricted to the 11th district.	1993–2003; All of Nash County. Parts of Halifax, Edgecombe, and Wilson counties.
Charles Albertson (Beulaville)	Democratic	January 1, 2003 – January 1, 2011	Redistricted from the 5th district. Retired.	2003–2005; All of Sampson and Duplin counties. Part of Harnett County.
Charles Albertson (Beulaville)	Democratic	January 1, 2003 – January 1, 2011	Redistricted from the 5th district. Retired.	2005–2013; All of Sampson, Duplin, and Lenoir counties.
Brent Jackson (Autryville)	Republican	January 1, 2011 – January 1, 2023	Redistricted to the 9th district.	2005–2013; All of Sampson, Duplin, and Lenoir counties.
Brent Jackson (Autryville)	Republican	January 1, 2011 – January 1, 2023	Redistricted to the 9th district.	2013–2023; All of Sampson and Duplin counties. Part of Johnston County.
Benton Sawrey (Clayton)	Republican	January 1, 2023 – Present		2023–Present; All of Johnston County.

== Election results ==
=== 2024 ===
North Carolina Senate 10th district general election, 2024
Party	Candidate	Votes	%
Republican	Benton Sawrey (incumbent)	70,773	58.75%
Democratic	Felicia Baxter	45,346	37.64%
Libertarian	Christopher Sessions	4,351	3.61%
Total votes		120,470	100%
Republican hold			

=== 2022 ===
North Carolina Senate 10th district Republican primary election, 2022
Party	Candidate	Votes	%
Republican	Benton Sawrey	12,318	65.60%
Republican	Jill Homan	3,729	19.86%
Republican	Matt Ansley	2,730	14.54%
Total votes		18,777	100%

North Carolina Senate 10th district general election, 2022
Party	Candidate	Votes	%
Republican	Benton Sawrey	48,083	63.90%
Democratic	Gettys Cohen Jr.	27,165	36.10%
Total votes		75,248	100%
Republican win (new seat)			

=== 2020 ===
North Carolina Senate 10th district general election, 2020
Party	Candidate	Votes	%
Republican	Brent Jackson (incumbent)	56,740	65.09%
Democratic	Vernon R. Moore	30,425	34.91%
Total votes		87,165	100%
Republican hold			

=== 2018 ===
North Carolina Senate 10th district general election, 2018
Party	Candidate	Votes	%
Republican	Brent Jackson (incumbent)	33,366	62.46%
Democratic	Vernon R. Moore	20,057	37.54%
Total votes		53,423	100%
Republican hold			

=== 2016 ===
North Carolina Senate 10th district general election, 2016
Party	Candidate	Votes	%
Republican	Brent Jackson (incumbent)	56,610	100%
Total votes		56,610	100%
Republican hold			

=== 2014 ===
North Carolina Senate 10th district general election, 2014
Party	Candidate	Votes	%
Republican	Brent Jackson (incumbent)	31,239	62.46%
Democratic	Donald B. Rains	18,779	37.54%
Total votes		50,018	100%
Republican hold			

=== 2012 ===
North Carolina Senate 10th district Republican primary election, 2012
Party	Candidate	Votes	%
Republican	Brent Jackson (incumbent)	12,380	74.54%
Republican	Mike Osbourne	4,228	25.46%
Total votes		16,608	100%

North Carolina Senate 10th district general election, 2012
Party	Candidate	Votes	%
Republican	Brent Jackson (incumbent)	48,772	100%
Total votes		48,772	100%
Republican hold			

=== 2010 ===
North Carolina Senate 10th district Democratic primary election, 2010
Party	Candidate	Votes	%
Democratic	Dewey Hudson	5,868	61.76%
Democratic	Gordon E. Vermillion	3,633	38.24%
Total votes		9,501	100%

North Carolina Senate 10th district Republican primary election, 2010
Party	Candidate	Votes	%
Republican	Brent Jackson	4,374	53.06%
Republican	Chris Humphrey	3,869	46.94%
Total votes		8,243	100%

North Carolina Senate 10th district general election, 2010
Party	Candidate	Votes	%
Republican	Brent Jackson	25,342	52.24%
Democratic	Dewey Hudson	23,167	47.76%
Total votes		48,509	100%
Republican gain from Democratic			

=== 2008 ===
North Carolina Senate 10th district general election, 2008
Party	Candidate	Votes	%
Democratic	Charles Albertson (incumbent)	51,375	100%
Total votes		51,375	100%
Democratic hold			

=== 2006 ===
North Carolina Senate 10th district general election, 2006
Party	Candidate	Votes	%
Democratic	Charles Albertson (incumbent)	20,673	64.47%
Republican	Adrain R. Arnett	11,395	35.53%
Total votes		32,068	100%
Democratic hold			

=== 2004 ===
North Carolina Senate 10th district Republican primary election, 2004
Party	Candidate	Votes	%
Republican	Rich Jarman	2,778	67.87%
Republican	Adrain Ray Arnett	1,315	32.13%
Total votes		4,093	100%

North Carolina Senate 10th district general election, 2004
Party	Candidate	Votes	%
Democratic	Charles Albertson (incumbent)	37,570	61.97%
Republican	Rich Jarman	23,054	38.03%
Total votes		60,624	100%
Democratic hold			

=== 2002 ===
North Carolina Senate 10th district Democratic primary election, 2002
Party	Candidate	Votes	%
Democratic	Charles Albertson (incumbent)	10,935	70.22%
Democratic	Robert Bradshaw	4,638	29.78%
Total votes		15,573	100%

North Carolina Senate 10th district Republican primary election, 2002
Party	Candidate	Votes	%
Republican	George E. Wilson	5,048	69.69%
Republican	Lewis T. Harris III	1,121	15.47%
Republican	Derl Walker	1,075	14.84%
Total votes		7,244	100%

North Carolina Senate 10th district general election, 2002
Party	Candidate	Votes	%
Democratic	Charles Albertson (incumbent)	21,927	54.52%
Republican	George E. Wilson	18,290	45.48%
Total votes		40,217	100%
Democratic hold			

=== 2000 ===
North Carolina Senate 10th district general election, 2000
Party	Candidate	Votes	%
Democratic	A.B. Swindell	27,757	55.26%
Republican	Rick Horner	22,477	44.75%
Total votes		50,234	100%
Democratic hold			
