= Carter–Finley Stadium =

Stadium in Raleigh, North Carolina

- The Carter
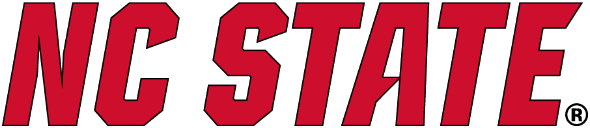

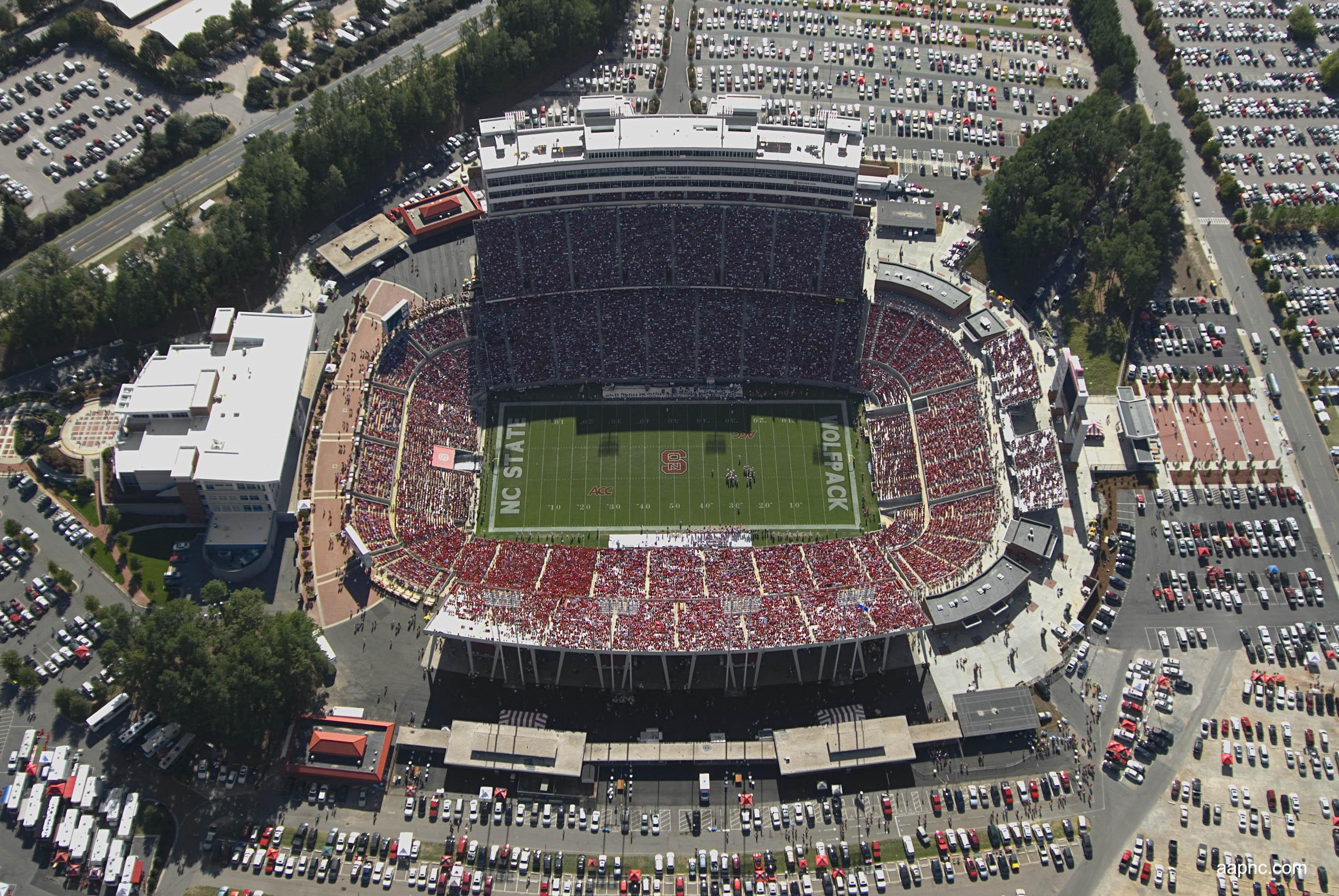
- Aerial view of the stadium, November 2007

- Location within North Carolina Location within the United States
- Interactive map of Carter–Finley Stadium
- Former names: Carter Stadium (1966–1979)
- Location: 4600 Trinity Road; Raleigh, North Carolina 27607
- Coordinates: 35°48′3″N 78°43′10″W
- Owner: North Carolina State University
- Operator: North Carolina State University
- Capacity: 56,919 (2021–present) Former capacity List: 57,583 (2006–2021); 57,500 (2005); 56,800 (2004); 53,800 (2003); 51,500 (1992–2002); 47,000 (1984–1991); 45,600 (1974–1983); 41,000 (1966–1973)
- Surface: Tifway 419 Bermuda Grass (sidelines are artificial turf)

Construction
- Groundbreaking: December 14, 1964
- Opened: October 8, 1966; 60 years ago
- Renovated: 2006, 2021
- Expanded: 1992, 2003-2005, 2021
- Cost: $3.7 million ($36.7 million in 2025 dollars)
- Architects: Milton Small and Associates & Charles H. Kahn (original 1966 stadium); Corley Redfoot Architects, Inc. (all additions and renovations since 2001)
- Structural engineer: LHC Structural Engineers (since 2001)
- General contractors: L.E. Wooten and Co.

Tenants
- NC State Wolfpack (NCAA) (1966–present); Raleigh-Durham Skyhawks (WLAF) (1991)

Website
- gopack.com/carter-finley-stadium

Wayne Day Family Field at Carter–Finley Stadium is a college football stadium located in Raleigh, North Carolina. It has been home to the NC State Wolfpack football team of the Atlantic Coast Conference (ACC) since 1966 and has a current seating capacity of 56,919 seats.

== History ==
As early as the 1950s, State was looking to replace its on-campus facility, Riddick Stadium. The concrete-and-wood stadium had been built in 1907 and was showing signs of decline. It never held more than 23,000 seats (14,000 permanent) at any time. Partly because of this, many of longtime coach Earle Edwards' teams played more games on the road than at home. At Edwards' urging, school officials began a concerted effort to build a more modern facility.

The new stadium finally opened in 1966. It was originally named Carter Stadium, in honor of Harry C. & Wilbert J. "Nick" Carter, both graduates of the university. They were major contributors to the original building of the stadium. The name of Albert E. Finley, another major contributor to the university, was added in September 1979.

While located on University land, the stadium is a few miles to the west of the academic campus on Trinity Road, just off Hillsborough Street.

Carter–Finley Stadium's season tickets have been sold out for nine straight years.

Carter–Finley Stadium has the smallest clearance between the stands and the sidelines of any stadium in the ACC.

Honored numbers displayed on the west facade of Carter–Finley Stadium include those of Roman Gabriel (18), Torry Holt (81), Philip Rivers (17), Bill Yoest (63), Dennis Byrd (77), Dick Christy (40), Jim Ritcher (51), Ted Brown (23), Mario Williams, Bradley Chubb (9), Russell Wilson (16), and Payton Wilson (11). Joe Thuney (54) is to be added in 2026. Gabriel, Ritcher, Christy, Brown, Holt, Byrd, Yoest, and Rivers' numbers are retired. Carter–Finley also displays banners from NC State's bowl appearances which include the Gator Bowl, Peach Bowl, and Liberty Bowl.

On November 25th, 2024, NC State University Athletics announced a partnership with Independent Sports and Entertainment (ISE) to seek a potential naming rights partner for the stadium, citing "...the blessing of the Carter and Finley families" for the process.

=== Renovations ===
Prior to the 2001 season, the university began a program of modernization of the stadium by enclosing the southern end zone with seats, and the state-of-the-art Murphy Center (named for Wendell Murphy) was built behind it. Following the 2004 football season, Carter–Finley was again expanded with the completion of the "Vaughn Towers", a complex of luxury boxes, club seats, and media facilities which opened for the 2005 football season.

For the 2006 season, a new north end zone grandstand was added consisting of 5,730 new chairback, bench, and handicap-accessible seating with another 1,630 permanent bleacher seats built underneath the video scoreboard making Carter–Finley a bowl and giving it a capacity of 57,583 spectators. Additional upgrades to the stadium included a new north end zone plaza with concession stands and the addition of two video screens in each corner of the south end zone.

Renovations done before the 2023 season included a new north end videoboard that was more than double the size of the previous screen and sound system upgrades for better performance for concerts and musical performances. Construction commenced after the completion of the 2023 NHL Stadium Series game between the Carolina Hurricanes and the Washington Capitals on February 18.

== Notable events ==
=== Concerts ===
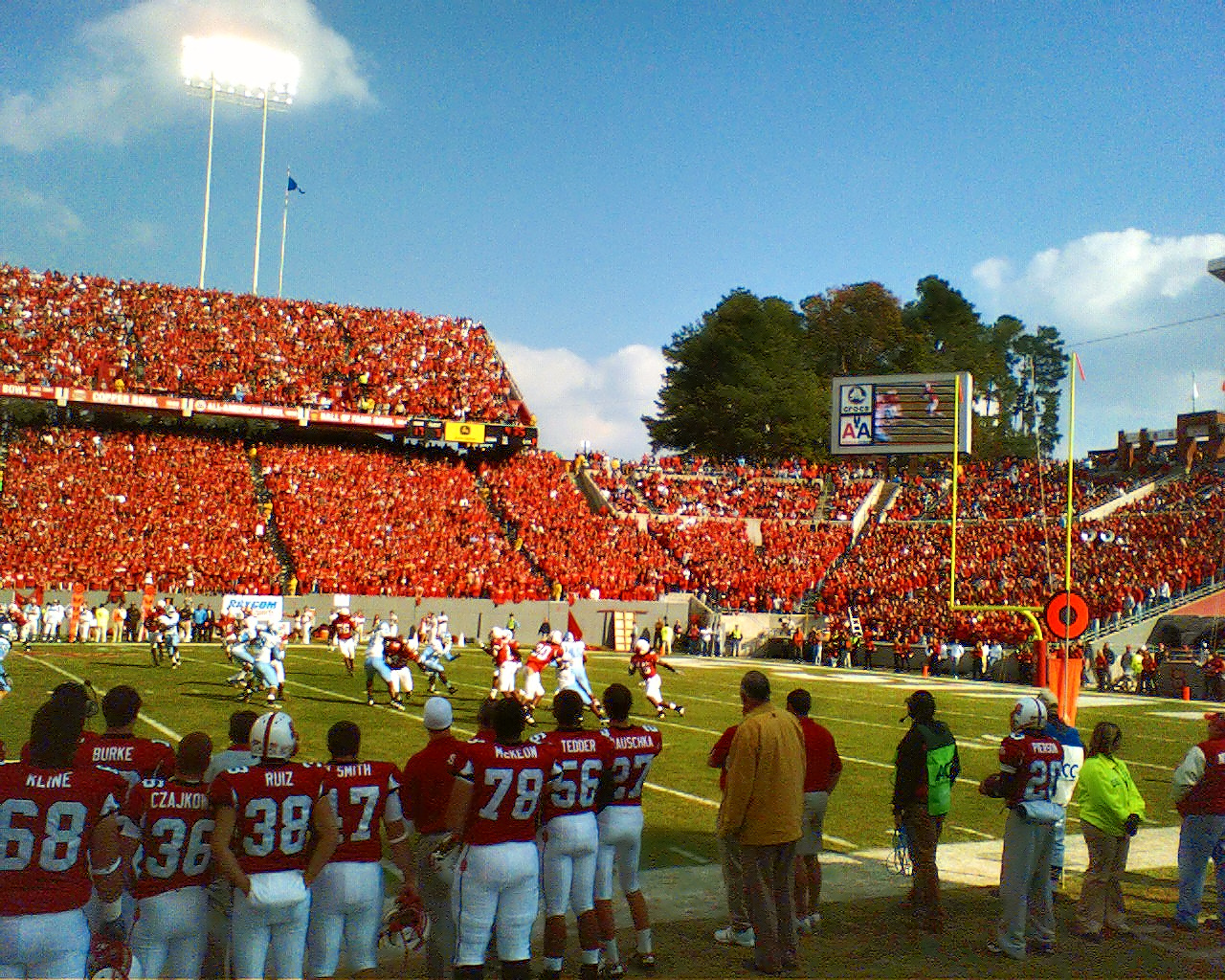
The crowd and players in a 2007 Wolfpack game

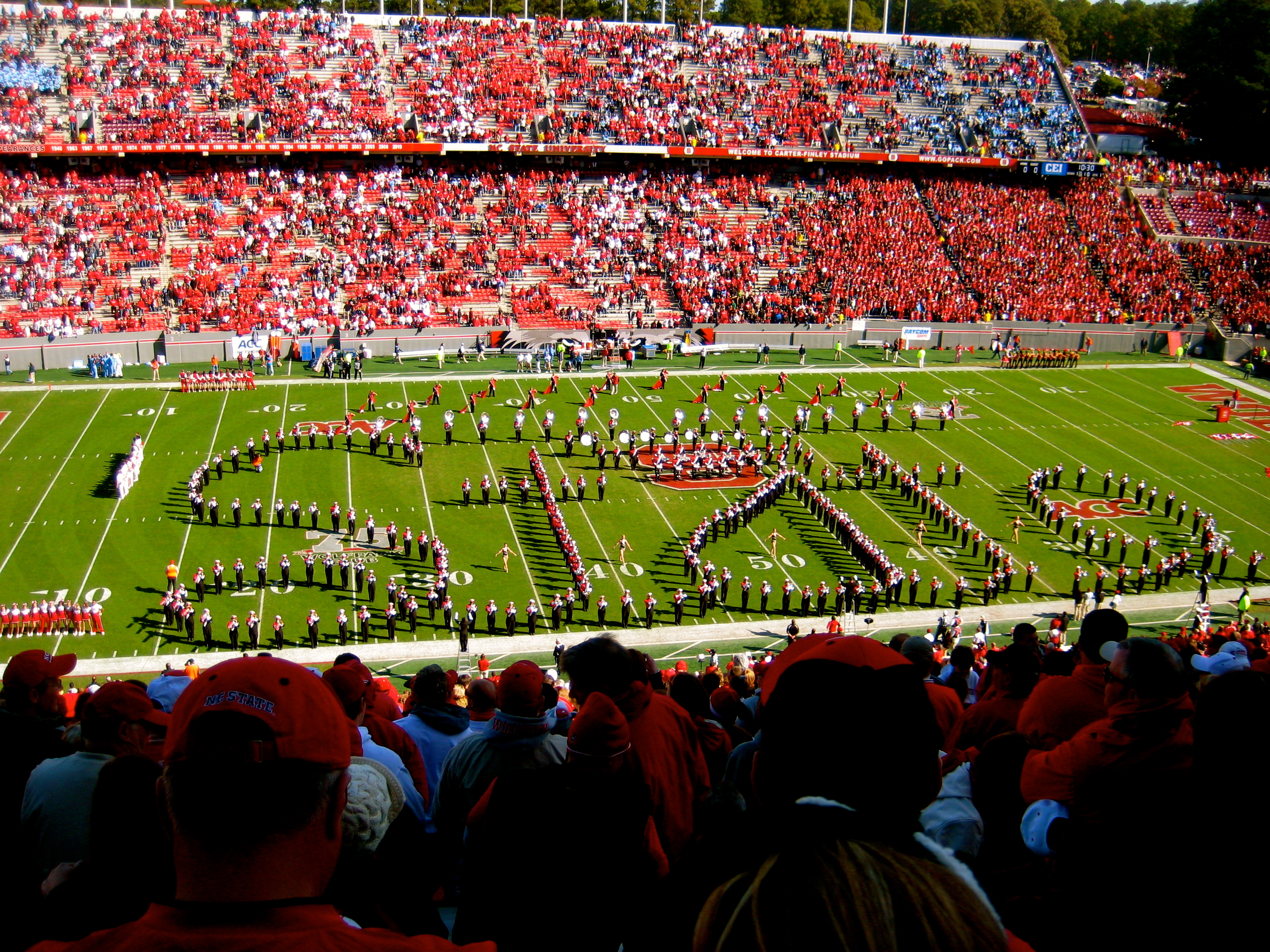
The band at Carter-Finley Stadium in 2008

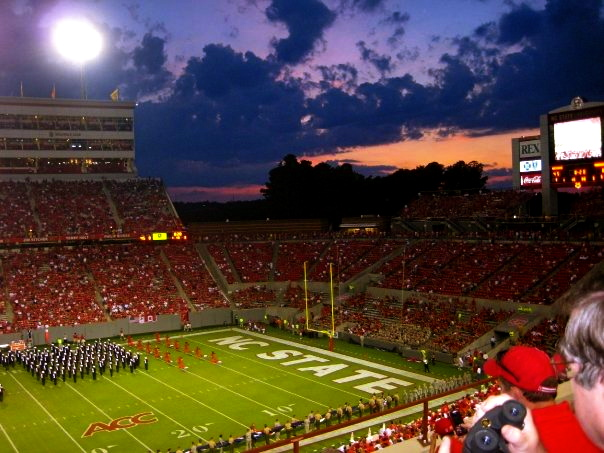
Sunset at Carter-Finley during a game in 2014

Date	Artist	Opening act(s)	Tour / Concert name	Attendance	Revenue	Notes
June 2, 1979	Boston, Van Halen, Poco & the Outlaws	—N/a	June Jam	40,000	N/A	
May 4, 1988	Pink Floyd	—N/a	A Momentary Lapse of Reason Tour	42,982 / 42,982	$866,576	
July 27, 1989	The Who	—N/a	The Kids Are Alright Reunion Tour	—N/a		
September 16, 1989	The Rolling Stones	Living Colour	Steel Wheels Tour	52,881 / 52,881	$1,506,393	
July 10, 1990	Grateful Dead	—N/a				
July 22, 1990	Paul McCartney	—N/a	The Paul McCartney World Tour	—N/a		
May 10, 1994	Pink Floyd	—N/a	The Division Bell Tour	46,656 / 48,000	$1,597,283	
September 7, 1994	The Rolling Stones	Lenny Kravitz	Voodoo Lounge Tour	38,738 / 38,738	$1,797,502	
May 30, 1998	George Strait	—N/a		45,536 / 45,536	$1,507,720	
July 4, 1998	Jimmy Buffett	Little Feat	Don't Stop The Carnival Tour	45,287 / 45,287	$1,524,695	
October 3, 2009	U2	Muse	U2 360° Tour	55,027 / 55,027	$4,962,240	This was the first time the venue had hosted a similar event, since the modernization of the stadium.
July 1, 2015	The Rolling Stones	The Avett Brothers	Zip Code Tour	40,428 / 40,428	$7,947,996	
May 3, 2016	Beyoncé	DJ Khaled	The Formation World Tour	38,292 / 38,292	$4,810,620	The first solo female to headline a concert in the stadium. During the show, the stadium was evacuated after lightning had been spotted in the area. The show later resumed.
October 14, 2025	Chris Brown	Jhené Aiko; Bryson Tiller	Breezy Bowl XX	43,373 / 43,373	$7,222,267	
July 23, 2026	Guns N' Roses	Public Enemy	2026 World Tour			
July 25, 2026	Noah Kahan	Gigi Perez Annabelle Dinda	The Great Divide Tour			
June 2, 2027	Metallica	Limp Bizkit; Avatar	M72 World Tour			

=== Soccer ===
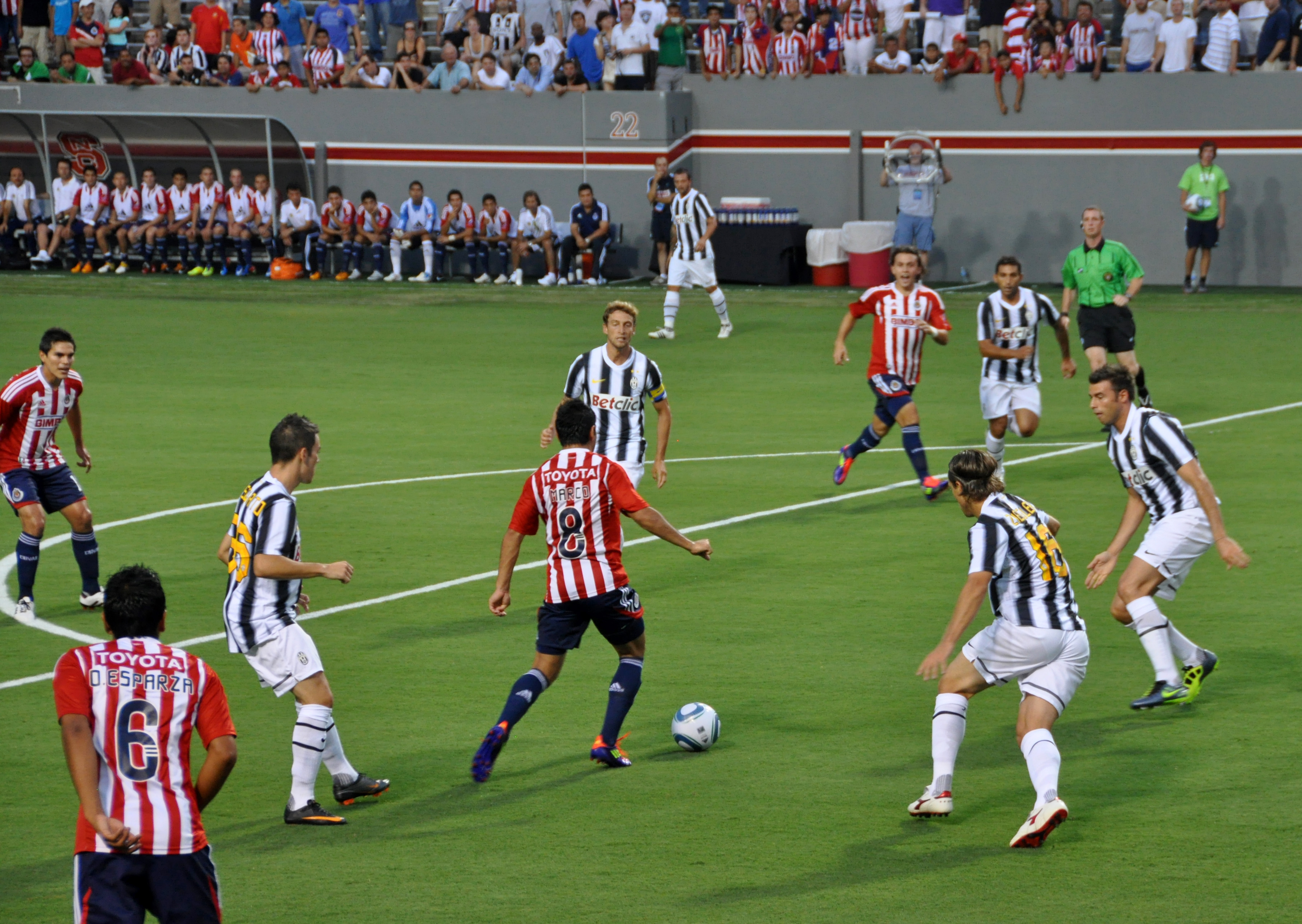
Guadalajara Chivas vs Juventus soccer game in 2011

On July 28, 2011, the World Football Challenge held an exhibition match between Juventus of Italy's Serie A, and Guadalajara Chivas of Mexico's Primera Division at the stadium.

Date	Winning Team	Result	Losing Team	Tournament	Spectators
July 28, 2011	(Italy) Juventus	1–0	(Mexico) Guadalajara Chivas	2011 World Football Challenge	16,124

=== Hockey ===
The National Hockey League announced on February 15, 2020, that the Carolina Hurricanes would host a Stadium Series game at Carter–Finley Stadium on February 20, 2021. The NHL announced on December 23, 2020, that the game had been postponed. On February 4, 2022, the NHL announced the game would take place in February 2023. On March 3, 2022, the NHL announced the game would take place on February 18, 2023, between the Hurricanes and the Washington Capitals.

The Hurricanes defeated the Capitals 4–1 with 56,961 fans in attendance.

Following the stadium series game, NC State's club hockey program, the IcePack, defeated the North Carolina Tar Heels 7–3 in front of an estimated 24,000 fans.

=== Other events ===
- Carter-Finley served as the primary venue for the 1999 Special Olympics World Summer Games from June 26 to July 4, 1999.
- Carter-Finley will serve as a host venue for the 2029 Summer World University Games.

== See also ==
- List of NCAA Division I FBS football stadiums
