= James Davis Speed =

American politician

Member of the North Carolina House of Representatives
- In office 1961–1972

Member of the North Carolina Senate from the 7th district
- In office 1977–1983

Member of the North Carolina Senate from the 11th district
- In office January 1, 1983 – January 1, 1997
- Preceded by: R. C. Soles Jr.
- Succeeded by: Allen Wellons

Personal details
- Born: January 30, 1915
- Died: June 14, 2006 (aged 91)
- Party: Democratic
- Spouse: Martha Matthews (m. 1947)
- Children: 3 (including Mark Speed)

James Davis Speed (January 30, 1915 – June 14, 2006) was an American politician. He served as a Democratic member of the North Carolina House of Representatives. He also served as a member for the 7th and 11th district of the North Carolina Senate.

Speed was the son of Addie Jeffreys and Henry Plummer Speed. He attended at the Gold Sand High School. Speed worked as a cowman on his family’s farm, and regarded himself primarily as a farmer.

In 1961, Speed was elected to the North Carolina House of Representatives, serving until 1972. In 1977, he was elected to represent the 7th district in the North Carolina Senate. In 1983 he was moved to the 11th district, replacing R. C. Soles Jr. who was moved to the 18th district. In December 1996, he retired from the Senate, to be replaced by Allen Wellons. He was honored with numerous awards in North Carolina.

Speed died in June 2006, at the age of 91.
