= A. B. Swindell =

American politician

Member of the North Carolina Senate
- In office January 1, 2001 – January 1, 2011
- Preceded by: Roy Cooper
- Succeeded by: Buck Newton
- Constituency: 10th district (2001-2003); 11th district (2003-2011)

Personal details
- Born: Albin Blount Swindell IV; October 14, 1945 (age 80) Robeson County, North Carolina, U.S.
- Party: Democratic
- Occupation: teacher, politician, consultant

Albin Blount Swindell IV (born October 14, 1945) is an American politician who was a Democratic member of the North Carolina General Assembly representing the state's eleventh Senate district, including constituents in Nash and Wilson counties. He was first elected in November 2000 and served five two-year terms. In the November 2010 election he was defeated by Buck Newton, his Republican challenger.

Swindell attended Wilson Technical Community College, Sandhills Community College, and North Carolina State University. From 1971 through 1983 he was a teacher in the Granville County Schools. From 1981 through 1985 he was a city council member in Oxford, North Carolina. He currently works as a consultant.

North Carolina Senate
| Preceded by Roy Cooper | Member of the North Carolina Senate from the 10th district 2001–2003 | Succeeded by Charles W. Albertson |
| Preceded by Allen Wellons | Member of the North Carolina Senate from the 11th district 2003-2011 | Succeeded by Buck Newton |
