= W. Brent Jackson =

American politician

Senator Brent Jackson
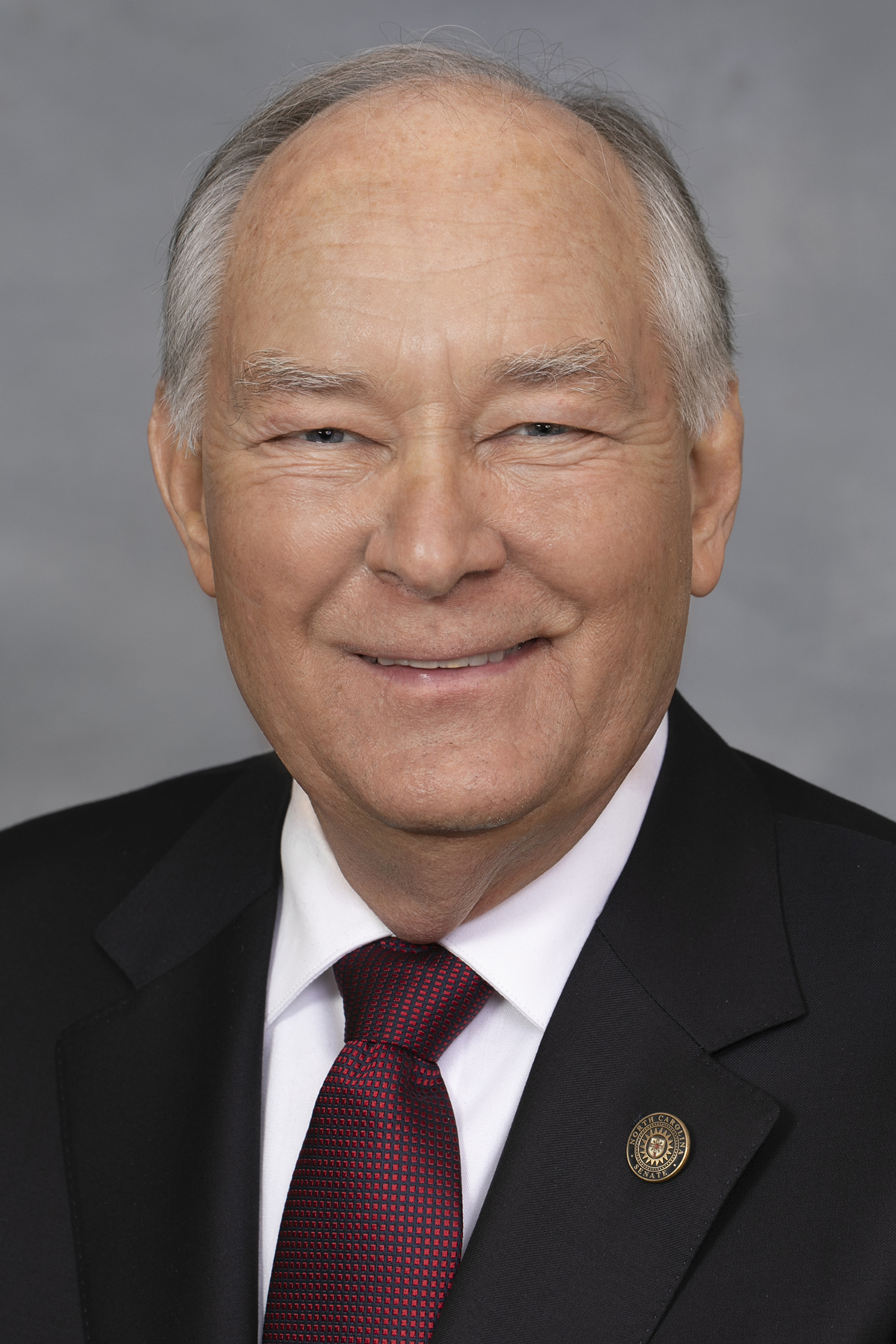

Member of the North Carolina Senate
- Incumbent
- Assumed office January 1, 2011
- Preceded by: Charles Albertson
- Constituency: 10th District (2011–2023); 9th District (2023–Present)

Personal details
- Born: November 8, 1957 (age 68) Clinton, North Carolina, US
- Party: Republican

William Brent Jackson (born November 8, 1957) is an American politician and businessman serving as a Republican member of the North Carolina Senate, representing the 9th district, which includes Jones, Duplin, Pender, Bladen, and Sampson counties.

== Career ==
=== Business ===
Jackson is the founder of Jackson Farming Company, an agricultural business that grows watermelons, cantaloupes, honeydews, strawberries, pumpkins, squash, slicer cucumbers, sweet potatoes, corn, wheat, soybeans, peanuts, and flue-cured tobacco. Jackson owns two country grain elevators for the purpose of purchasing and storing corn, small grains, and wheat from his farm and area farmers. In 2005, he expanded and built a liquid fertilizer plant, which supplies his farms and area farmers with drip fertilizer.

=== North Carolina Senate ===
Jackson is co-chairman of the Senate Appropriations/Base Budget Committee, and the immediate past co-chairman of the Senate Appropriations Subcommittee on Natural and Economic Resources and the Senate Agriculture/Environment/Natural Resources Committee. He is also co-chairman of the Joint Environmental Review Commission, Joint Agriculture and Forestry Awareness Study Commission and the Agriculture and Rural Caucus of the North Carolina General Assembly. Additionally, Jackson sits on the Senate Finance Committee, Rules and Operations of the Senate Committee, and Senate State and Local Government Committee. In 2014, he was elected to the Legislative Board of the international organization, State Agriculture and Rural Leaders.

In 2015, Jackson authored an ag-gag bill subsequently made law after the legislature overrode a veto by Governor Pat McCrory. The bill allows for prosecution of individuals who go undercover to expose animal cruelty and other illegal activity in the North Carolina factory animal farming industries.

In May 2019, a building owned by Jackson Farming Company suffered significant fire damage and was destroyed.

==== Electoral history ====
===== 2022 =====
North Carolina Senate 9th district general election, 2022
Party	Candidate	Votes	%
Republican	Brent Jackson (incumbent)	50,252	100%
Total votes		50,252	100%
Republican hold			

===== 2020 =====
North Carolina Senate 10th district general election, 2020
Party	Candidate	Votes	%
Republican	Brent Jackson (incumbent)	56,740	65.09%
Democratic	Vernon R. Moore	30,425	34.91%
Total votes		87,165	100%
Republican hold			

===== 2018 =====
North Carolina Senate 10th district general election, 2018
Party	Candidate	Votes	%
Republican	Brent Jackson (incumbent)	33,366	62.46%
Democratic	Vernon R. Moore	20,057	37.54%
Total votes		53,423	100%
Republican hold			

===== 2016 =====
North Carolina Senate 10th district general election, 2016
Party	Candidate	Votes	%
Republican	Brent Jackson (incumbent)	56,610	100%
Total votes		56,610	100%
Republican hold			

===== 2014 =====
North Carolina Senate 10th district general election, 2014
Party	Candidate	Votes	%
Republican	Brent Jackson (incumbent)	31,239	62.46%
Democratic	Donald B. Rains	18,779	37.54%
Total votes		50,018	100%
Republican hold			

===== 2012 =====
North Carolina Senate 10th district Republican primary election, 2012
Party	Candidate	Votes	%
Republican	Brent Jackson (incumbent)	12,380	74.54%
Republican	Mike Osbourne	4,228	25.46%
Total votes		16,608	100%

North Carolina Senate 10th district general election, 2012
Party	Candidate	Votes	%
Republican	Brent Jackson (incumbent)	48,772	100%
Total votes		48,772	100%
Republican hold			

===== 2010 =====
North Carolina Senate 10th district Democratic primary election, 2010
Party	Candidate	Votes	%
Democratic	Dewey Hudson	5,868	61.76%
Democratic	Gordon E. Vermillion	3,633	38.24%
Total votes		9,501	100%

North Carolina Senate 10th district Republican primary election, 2010
Party	Candidate	Votes	%
Republican	Brent Jackson	4,374	53.06%
Republican	Chris Humphrey	3,869	46.94%
Total votes		8,243	100%

North Carolina Senate 10th district general election, 2010
Party	Candidate	Votes	%
Republican	Brent Jackson	25,342	52.24%
Democratic	Dewey Hudson	23,167	47.76%
Total votes		48,509	100%
Republican gain from Democratic			

== Personal life ==
Jackson was born in Clinton, North Carolina and lives in Autryville with Debbie, his wife of 41 years. He is active in his church, Union Grove Baptist Church, and is the father of three sons and grandfather of three grandchildren.

North Carolina Senate
Preceded by Charles Albertson	Member of the North Carolina Senate from the 10th district 2011–2023	Succeeded by Benton Sawrey
Preceded by Michael Lee	Member of the North Carolina Senate from the 9th district 2023–Present	Incumbent
