= Wendell H. Murphy =

American politician

Wendell H. Murphy is a former North Carolina farmer, Democratic politician, and namesake of the Wendell H. Murphy Football Center.

== Early life ==
Wendell H. Murphy was born in Rose Hill, North Carolina. In 1960, Murphy received a B.S. in agriculture from North Carolina State University. After graduating from college, Murphy became an agriculture teacher, but soon Wendell and his dad, Holmes Murphy, opened a feeding manufacturing operation. The operation started in 1964 with area farmers in open lots. By 1979, Wendell and Holmes Murphy had started sow and farrowing operations as well. The business is now known as Murphy Family Ventures and is a contract grower for Smithfield Foods.

== Political career ==
In 1983, Murphy was elected to the North Carolina House of Representatives as a Democrat. He represented North Carolina's tenth district until 1988. He was then elected to the North Carolina Senate where he served until 1992. During this time, Murphy received a lot of attention for his work in politics including the Tar Heel of the Week Award by The News & Observer in May 1987 and the Order of the Long Leaf Pine in 1988. Murphy was later profiled by The News & Observer in their Pulitzer prize-winning "Boss Hog" series. In these investigative pieces, the N&O illustrated the rise of the hog industry in North Carolina with the help of politicians, such as Murphy.

Critics of Murphy claim that the laws he passed helped to enable unsustainable growth in the hog industry, which later caused massive water pollution resulting in fish kills throughout eastern North Carolina. Proponents on the other hand claim that his legislation helped to expand the industry at a time when it was needed to offset the job losses caused by the decline of tobacco farming.

=== North Carolina State University arena and stadium projects ===
While in politics, Murphy also helped with North Carolina State University athletics. He was a member of the Centennial Authority, which helped develop the RBC Center, the home for NC State Wolfpack men's basketball along with the Carolina Hurricanes and Carolina Cobras. In 1987, while serving as senator, Murphy sponsored legislation that gave $1.5 million for the initial planning of the RBC Center. Murphy then kept working to get funding to the arena until he eventually got $22 million donated to the project. For his work and financial donations supporting North Carolina State University athletics, the Wendell H. Murphy Football Center (at Carter-Finley Stadium) was named after Murphy in 2003.

== Personal ==
Wendell Murphy now lives in his birthplace of Rose Hill, North Carolina with his wife Linda. He has four children, seven grandchildren, and a private yacht named Murphy's Law.
