= R. C. Soles Jr. =

American politician (1934–2021)

R.C. Soles Jr.
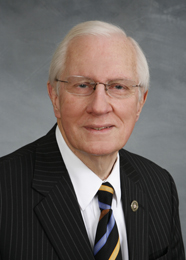

Member of the North Carolina Senate
- In office January 1, 1977 – January 1, 2011
- Preceded by: Edd Nye
- Succeeded by: Bill Rabon
- Constituency: 11th District (1977–1983); 18th District (1983–2003); 8th District (2003–2011)

Member of the North Carolina House of Representatives
- In office January 1, 1969 – January 1, 1977
- Preceded by: Odell Williamson; Clyde Moore Collier
- Succeeded by: Edd Nye; George Ronald Taylor
- Constituency: 13th District (1969–1973); 19th District (1973–1977)

Personal details
- Born: Robert Charles Soles Jr. December 17, 1934 Tabor City, North Carolina, U.S.
- Died: February 5, 2021 (aged 86) Loris, South Carolina, U.S.
- Party: Democratic
- Education: Wake Forest University (BA); University of North Carolina, Chapel Hill (JD)
- Occupation: Attorney

Robert Charles Soles Jr. (December 17, 1934 – February 5, 2021) was a Democratic member of the North Carolina Senate, representing the 8th district from 1977 to 2011. His district included Brunswick, Columbus and Pender counties. From 1969 to 1976, Soles served in the North Carolina House of Representatives. Republican Bill Rabon now holds the seat that Soles held for over three decades; it had not been held by a Republican since 1869.

Soles was the chairman of the Senate Democratic Caucus.

== Biography ==
He was the son of Robert C. (Rob) Soles, a local hardware store owner. He attended the Tabor City school system before leaving briefly to attend university. Soles was a lifelong bachelor with a close endearing friendship to his lifelong law partner, William(Bill) W. Phipps. They built adjacent houses in a private neighborhood on Lake Tabor.

== Career ==
Soles graduated with a B.A. from Wake Forest University and received his J.D. from the University of North Carolina at Chapel Hill.

He was a practicing attorney at Soles, Phipps, Ray, and Prince Law Firm in Tabor City, North Carolina. Sherry Dew Prince broke ties with Soles when she pursued an elected position as a District Judge and she opened a solo practice in Whiteville, North Carolina. In 2006, the N.C. Bar Association inducted him into the General Practice Hall of Fame. At one point, the North Carolina Center for Public Policy Research named him the 8th most effective member of the legislature.

Soles was the founding president of the Southeastern Community College Foundation, a former member of the Governor's Crime Commission, and former board member of the Columbus County Community Foundation and Opera Company of North Carolina.

== 1980s criminal investigations ==
Soles was indicted in 1983 for conspiracy, vote buying, perjury, and aiding and abetting bribery. A judge dismissed three of the charges and Soles was acquitted of aiding and abetting Columbus County Commissioner Edward Walton Williamson in obtaining payoffs from undercover FBI agents.

== Allegations and Assault conviction ==
In 2009 allegations from several men were published, claiming that Soles sexually abused them when they were minors. In another incident, he allegedly pepper sprayed a young man. Soles has denied having sexual relations with any of the young men. In an August, 2009 incident, he shot a young man and former legal client in the leg while he was allegedly trying to kick in Soles' front door. Soles' lawyer, Joseph Cheshire, said the shooting was self-defense. Cheshire and Soles both stated that Soles has been generous to former clients in hoping to ease them back to a law-abiding life.

On December 30, 2009, Soles (at the time, the longest-serving legislator in the state) announced he would not seek re-election in 2010.

On 7 January 2010, Soles was indicted on charges of assault with a deadly weapon inflicting serious injury. Soles pled guilty to assault with a deadly weapon and was fined $1,000.

The allegations resurfaced in June 2011, with three men having publicly accused Soles of sexual abuse.

North Carolina House of Representatives
Preceded by Odell Williamson; Clyde Moore Collier	Member of the North Carolina House of Representatives from the 13th district 1969–1973; Served alongside: Arthur W. Williamson, Thomas Joseph Harrelson Jr.	Succeeded by William Thomas Watkins; James Edward Ramsey; Bobby Wayne Rogers
Preceded by Samuel Henry Johnson; Howard Fabing Twiggs; Robert L. Farrmer; Robert W. Wynne	Member of the North Carolina House of Representatives from the 19th district 1973–1977; Served alongside: Jimmy Green, Charles Graham Tart, Ottis Richard Wright Jr.	Succeeded by Edd Nye; George Ronald Taylor
North Carolina Senate
Preceded by Edd Nye	Member of the North Carolina Senate from the 11th district 1977–1983	Succeeded by James Davis Speed
Preceded by Cary Allred	Member of the North Carolina Senate from the 18th district 1983–2003	Succeeded by Wib Gulley
Preceded by John Kerr	Member of the North Carolina Senate from the 8th district 2003–2011	Succeeded by Bill Rabon
