= Lisa Stone Barnes =

American politician

Lisa Barnes
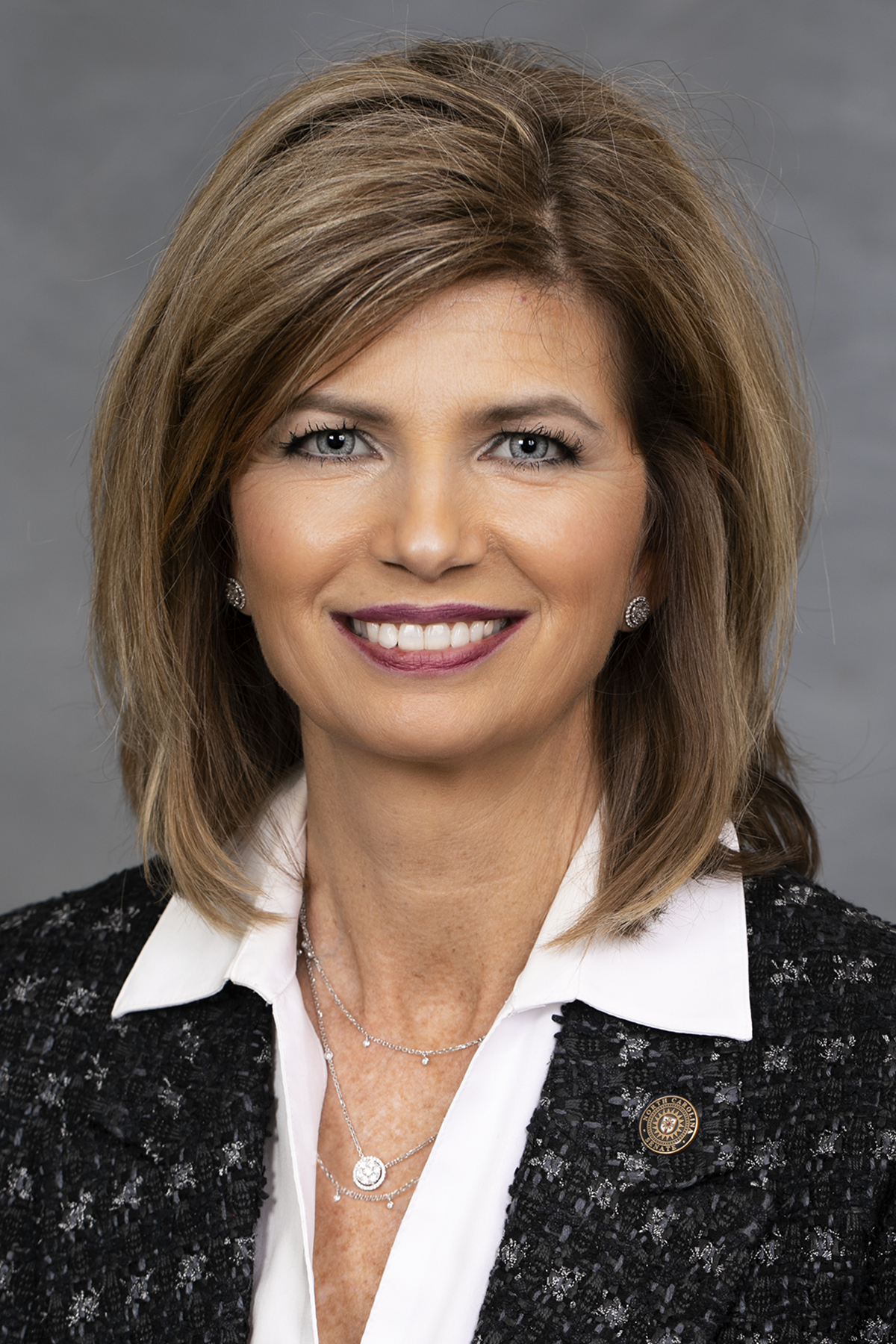

Member of the North Carolina Senate from the 11th district
- Incumbent
- Assumed office January 1, 2021
- Preceded by: Rick Horner

Member of the North Carolina House of Representatives from the 7th district
- In office January 9, 2019 – January 1, 2021
- Preceded by: Bobbie Richardson
- Succeeded by: Matthew Winslow

Personal details
- Born: Donna Lisa Stone; July 16, 1966 (age 60) Nash, North Carolina, U.S.
- Party: Republican
- Spouse: Johnny Barnes (m. 1987)
- Education: Peace College (AA); North Carolina State University (BA)
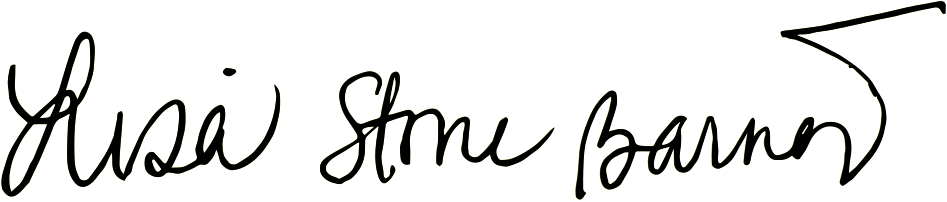
- Signature

Lisa Stone Barnes (born July 16, 1966) is an American businesswoman and politician. A member of the Republican Party, she was elected to the North Carolina House of Representatives in 2018 after serving for six years on the Nash County board of commissioners. Rather than seek reelection, Barnes instead decided to instead run for the state senate in 2020, defeating former senator Allen Wellons.

== Early life and education ==
Barnes was born Donna Lisa Stone to Mr. and Mrs. Donald R. Stone in Nash County, North Carolina. She graduated from Southern Nash High School and Peace College before marrying Johnny Carson Barnes at Middlesex Church of God on December 12, 1987. She received a Bachelor of Arts degree in political science from North Carolina State University in 1988 and completed the legal assistant program at Meredith College.

== Political career ==
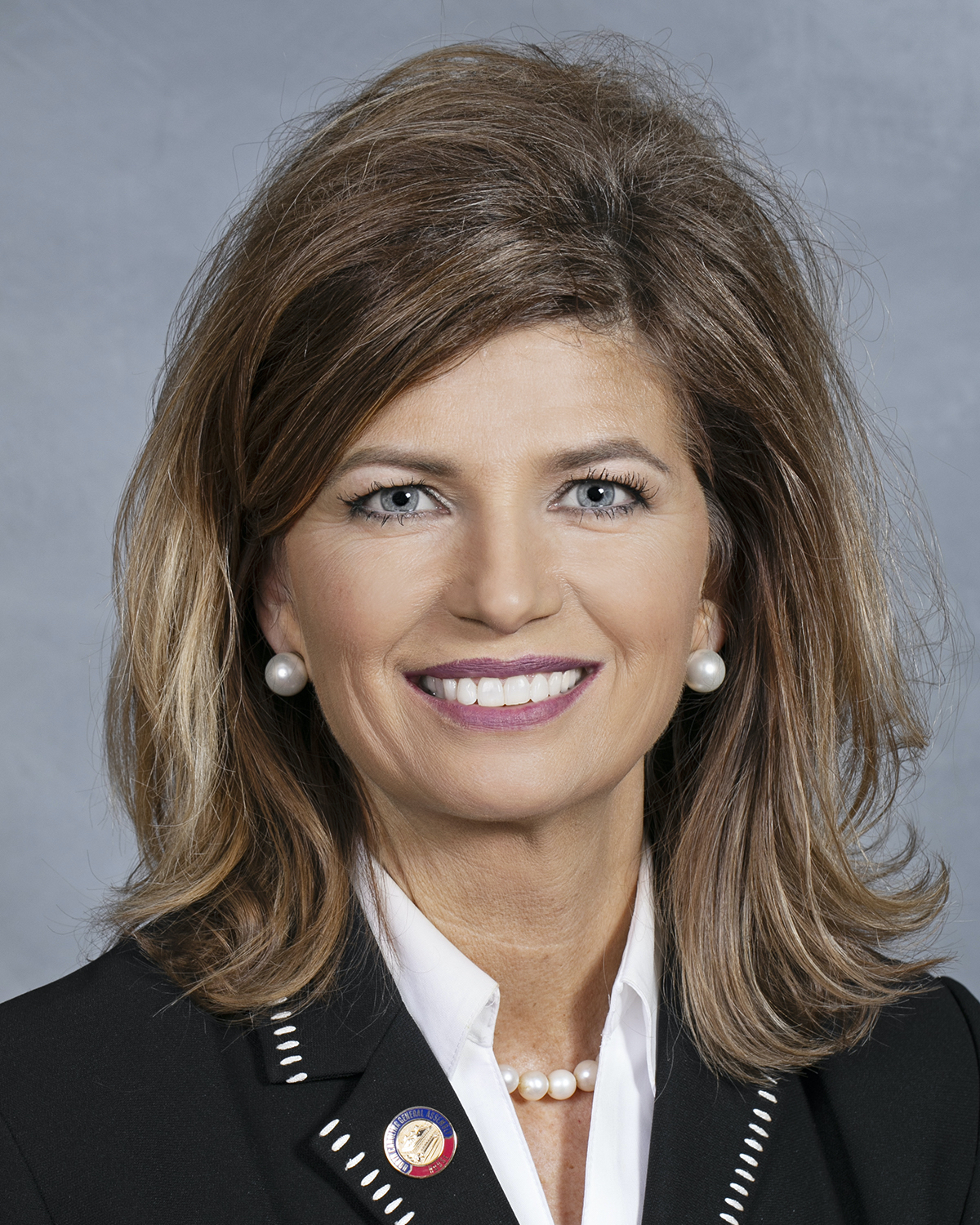
Barnes in 2018 as a member of the state house

Barnes ran for the 4th district seat on the Nash County board of commissioners in 2012, challenging incumbent Republican Danny Tyson. Central to the race was a proposed Sanderson Farms poultry processing plant, which Tyson, who was running for a third term, supported. Barnes, having previously cited environmental concerns about the project during her tenure on the county planning board, opposed it. She went on to win the primary and defeated Bert Daniel in the general election, becoming the county's youngest commissioner.

In 2018, Barnes defeated former state representative Glen Bradley for the Republican nomination in North Carolina's 7th state house district. That November, she succeeded in unseating incumbent Democratic representative Bobbie Richardson, whose district was heavily redrawn in response to a federal lawsuit alleging racial gerrymandering by the state legislature. Barnes was sworn into office by North Carolina Supreme Court associate justice Paul Martin Newby.

A year into her term, Barnes announced her intention to run for the 11th district state senate seat being vacated by the retiring Rick Horner in 2020. After defeating Johnston County commissioner Patrick Harris and retired Air Force colonel Dennis Nielsen in the March primary by a wide margin, she faced the Democratic nominee, former senator Allen Wellons in November. Barnes defeated Wellons by a ten-point margin.

== Personal life ==
Barnes lived in Spring Hope, North Carolina with her late husband, Johnny, who was president of Barnes Farming Corporation before his death in 2025. Barnes Family Farms was put into receivership after defaulting on more than $40 million in loans.

They have three children: Bethany, Joshua, and Jacy. They attend the Ridgecrest Worship Center in Rocky Mount, where Barnes has served as co-president of Women's Ministries.

North Carolina House of Representatives
Preceded by Bobbie Richardson	Member of the North Carolina House of Representatives from the 7th District; 2019–2021	Succeeded by Matthew Winslow
North Carolina Senate
Preceded by Rick Horner	Member of the North Carolina Senate from the 11th district 2021–present	Incumbent
