= Allen Wellons =

American attorney and politician

Member of the North Carolina Senate from the 11th district
- In office January 1, 1997 – January 1, 2003
- Preceded by: Jim Speed
- Succeeded by: Fred Smith (Redistricting)

Personal details
- Born: Allen Hewitt Wellons; March 12, 1949 (age 77) Smithfield, North Carolina
- Party: Democratic
- Spouse: Elizabeth Hobgood Wellons
- Education: University of North Carolina at Chapel Hill (BA); North Carolina Central University (JD)

Allen Hewitt Wellons (born March 12, 1949) is an American attorney and Democratic politician. The onetime campaign manager for 11th district state senator Jim Speed, he succeeded the longtime lawmaker after he retired in 1996. Wellons ran for reelection in the newly drawn 12th district in 2002 but lost to Republican Johnston County commissioner Fred Smith. In 2020, he decided to run again for the Senate, challenging state representative Lisa Stone Barnes to succeed the retiring Rick Horner.
