= Matthew Winslow =

American politician from North Carolina

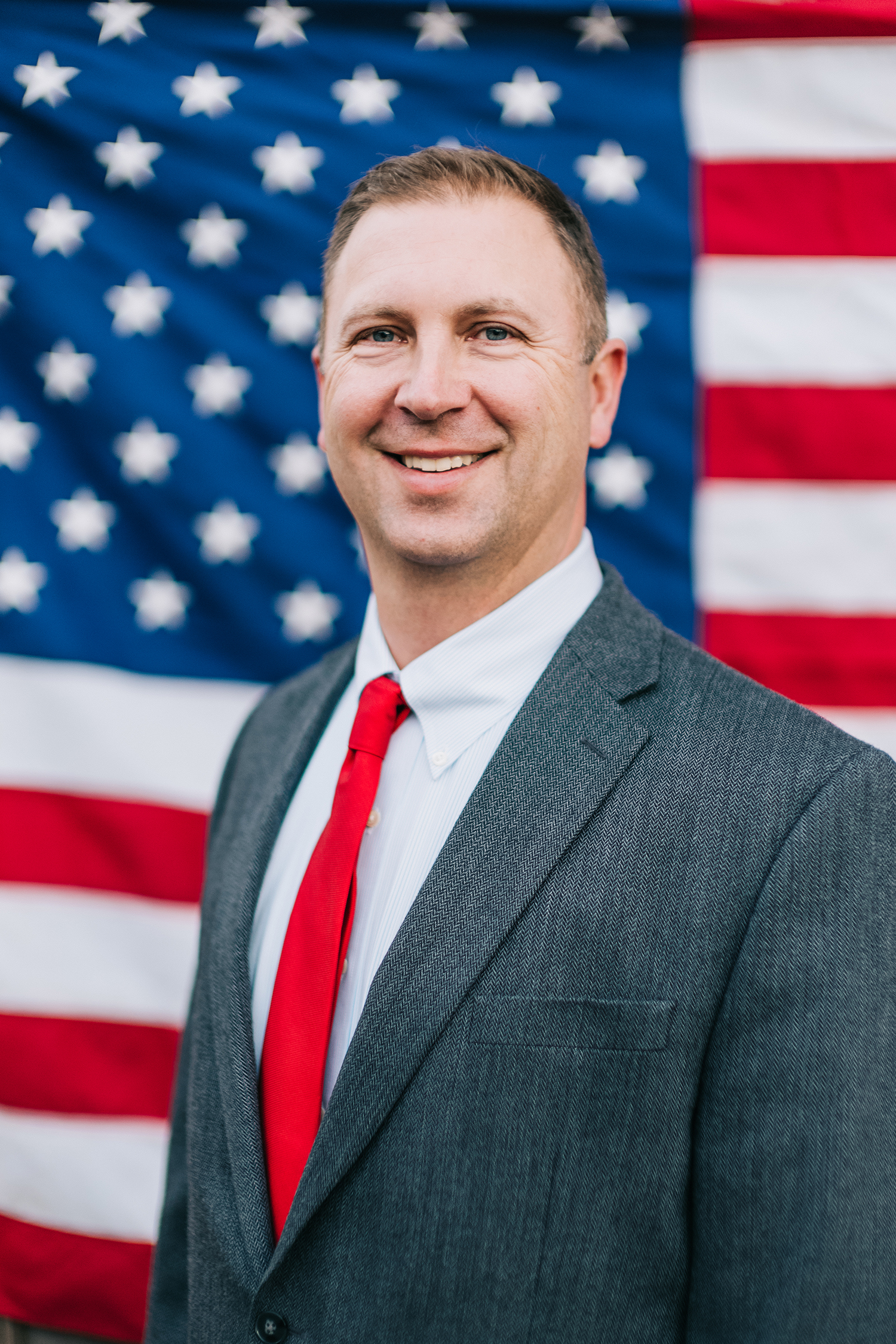

Member of the North Carolina House of Representatives from the 7th district
- Incumbent
- Assumed office January 1, 2021
- Preceded by: Lisa Stone Barnes

Personal details
- Party: Republican
- Spouse: Marquita
- Children: 2
- Education: East Carolina University (BS)
- Occupation: Owner of Winslow Homes
- Website: Official Website

Matthew Dale Winslow is a Republican member of the North Carolina House of Representatives representing the 7th district (including all of Franklin County and part of Nash County).

== Electoral history ==
North Carolina House of Representatives 7th district general election, 2020
Party	Candidate	Votes	%
Republican	Matthew Winslow	26,166	58.97%
Democratic	Phil Stover	18,208	41.03%
Total votes		44,374	100%
Republican hold			

== Committee assignments ==
=== 2021-2022 session ===
- Local Government
- Local Government - Land Use, Planning and Development (Vice Chair)
- Commerce
- Energy and Public Utilities
- Finance
- Homeland Security, Military and Veterans Affairs

North Carolina House of Representatives
Preceded by Lisa Stone Barnes	Member of the North Carolina House of Representatives from the 7th district 2021-Present	Incumbent
