= 2016 North Carolina Attorney General election =

- November 8, 2016
- Turnout: 68.98%
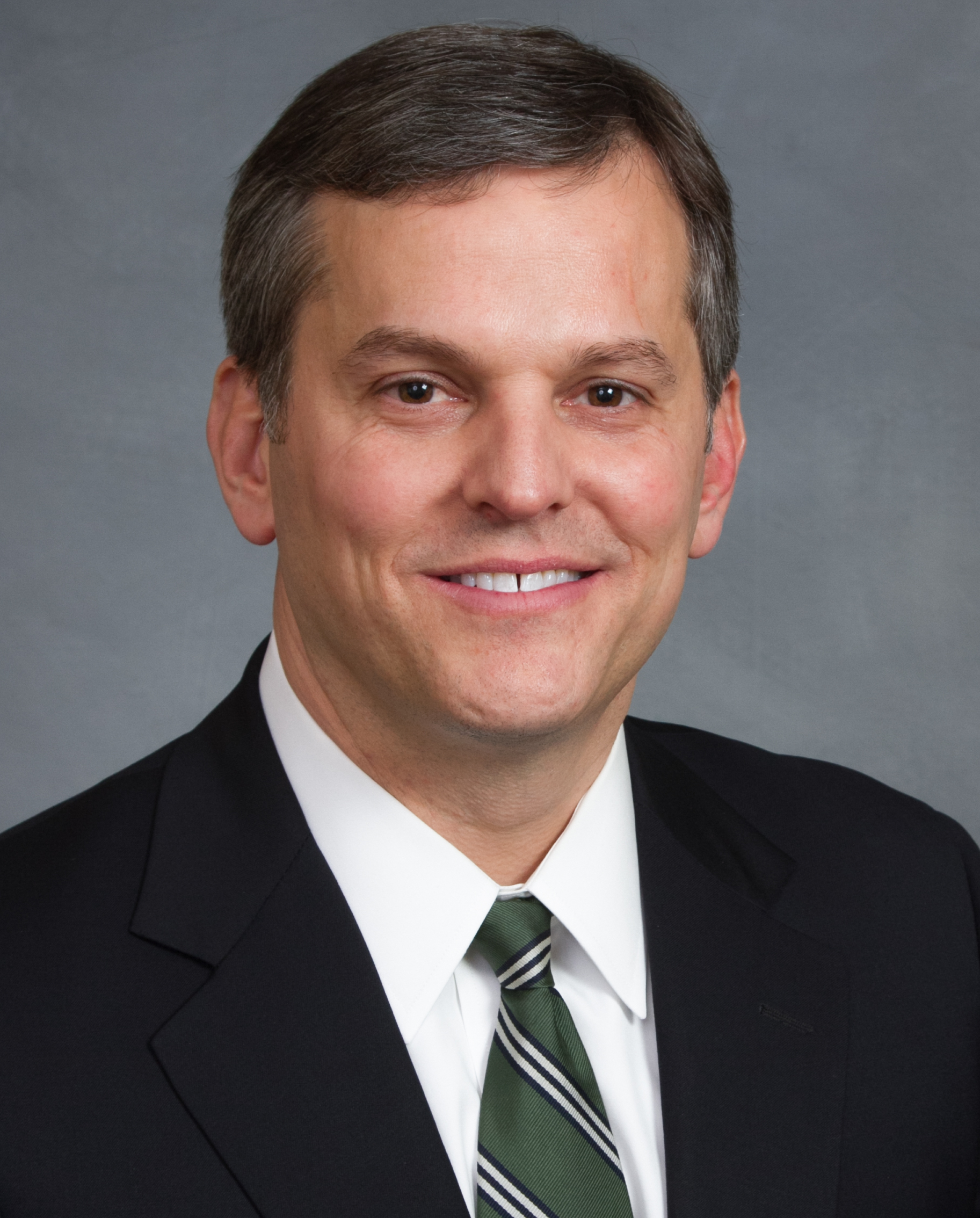

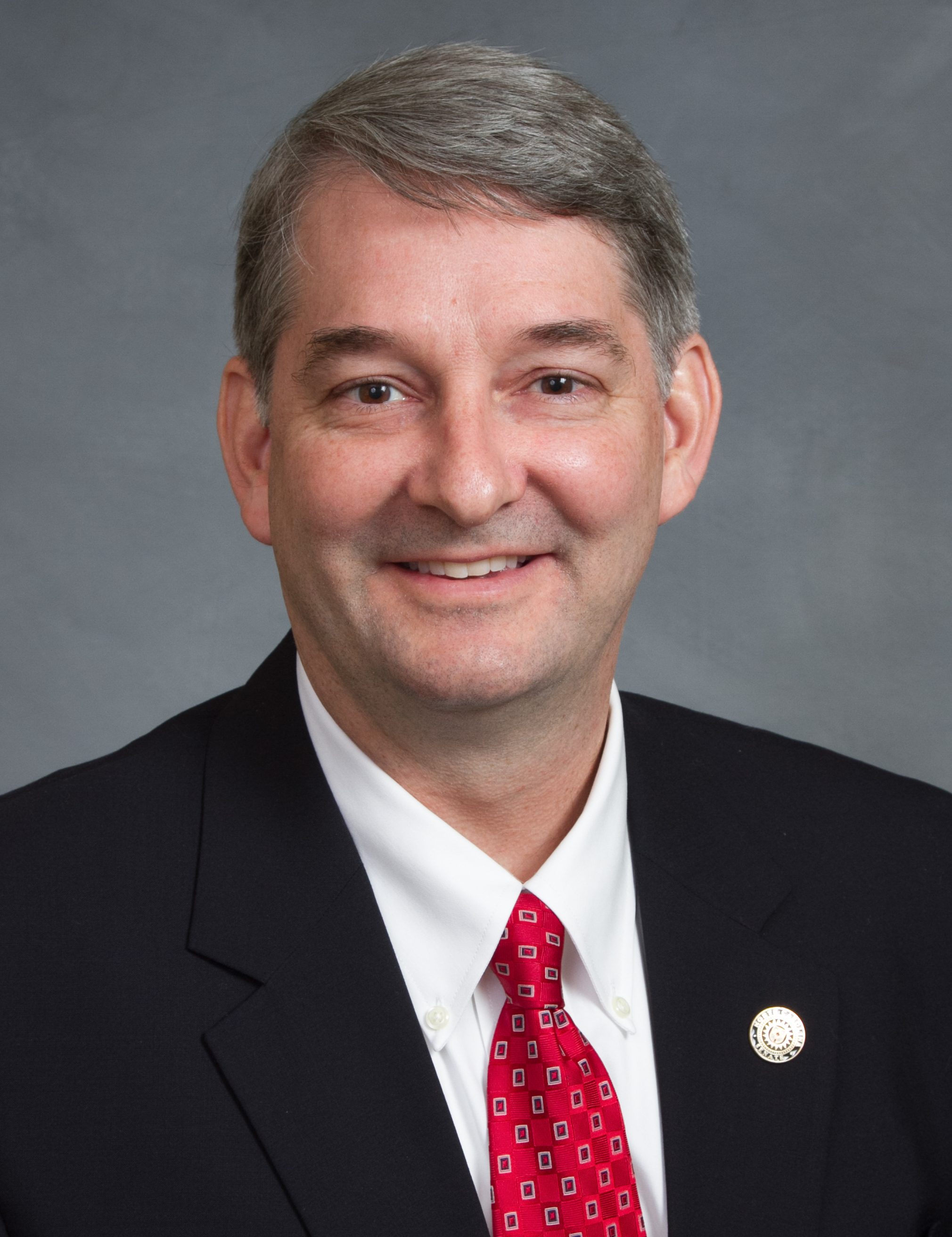
Nominee	Josh Stein	Buck Newton
Party	Democratic	Republican
Popular vote	2,303,681	2,279,076
Percentage	50.27%	49.73%
- Stein: 50–60% 60–70% 70–80% 80–90% >90% Newton: 50–60% 60–70% 70–80% 80–90% >90%
Attorney General before election
Roy Cooper
Democratic
Elected Attorney General
Josh Stein
Democratic

The 2016 North Carolina Attorney General election was held on November 8, 2016, to elect the Attorney General of North Carolina, concurrently with the 2016 U.S. presidential election, as well as elections to the United States Senate and elections to the United States House of Representatives and various state and local elections.

Incumbent Democratic Attorney General Roy Cooper chose not to run for re-election to a fifth term in office, and instead successfully ran for Governor.

Primary elections were held on March 15, 2016.

Democratic former state senator Josh Stein defeated Republican state senator Buck Newton in the general election. With a margin of 0.4%, this was the closest attorney general race of the 2016 election cycle.

== Democratic primary ==
Attorney Tim Dunn had announced in November 2014 that he planned to run for attorney general if Roy Cooper did not run for re-election. Cooper did run for governor as expected, but Dunn did not make any further announcements and did not end up running.

=== Candidates ===
==== Declared ====
- Josh Stein, former state senator and former deputy attorney general of North Carolina
- Marcus Williams, attorney, candidate for U.S. Senate in 2008 and 2010, candidate for NC-08 in 2012, and candidate for state senate in 2014

==== Declined ====
- Roy Cooper, incumbent Attorney General (ran for Governor)
- Tim Dunn, attorney and perennial candidate

=== Results ===
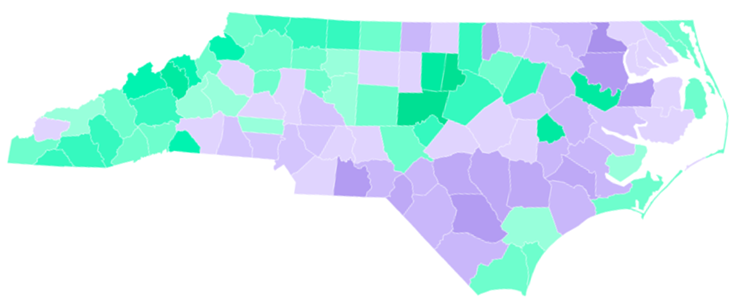
Candidate performance by County: Stein: 75-80%; 70-75%; 65-70%; 60-65%; 55-60%; 50-55%; Williams: 75-80%; 70-75%; 65-70%; 60-65%; 55-60%; 50-55%

Democratic primary results
Party	Candidate	Votes	%
Democratic	Josh Stein	510,003	53.37
Democratic	Marcus Williams	445,524	46.63
Total votes		955,527	100.0

== Republican primary ==
=== Candidates ===
==== Declared ====
- Buck Newton, state senator
- Jim O'Neill, Forsyth County District Attorney

==== Declined ====
- George Rouco, attorney and former CIA officer (ran for NC-09)

=== Results ===
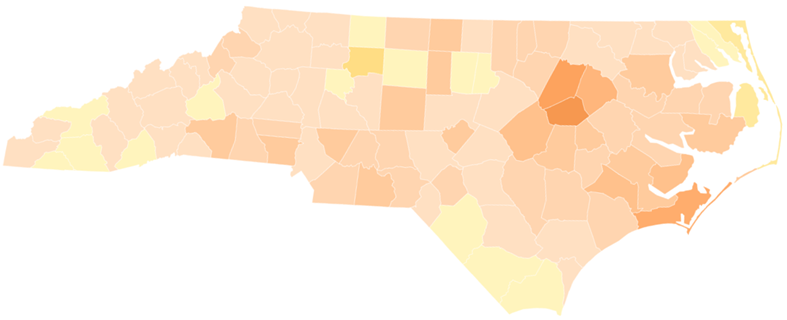
Candidate performance by County: Newton: 85-90%; 80-85%; 75-80%; 70-75%; 65-70%; 60-65%; 55-60%; 50-55%; O'Neill: 60-65%; 55-60%; 50-55%

Republican primary results
Party	Candidate	Votes	%
Republican	Buck Newton	503,880	54.9
Republican	Jim O'Neill	414,073	45.1
Total votes		917,953	100.0

== General election ==
=== Predictions ===
Source	Ranking
Governing	Tossup

=== Polling ===
Poll source	Date(s) administered	Sample size	Margin of error	Josh Stein (D)	Buck Newton (R)	Other	Undecided
SurveyUSA	October 28–31, 2016	659	± 3.9%	47%	43%	—	10%
Public Policy Polling	October 21–22, 2016	875	± 3.3%	44%	39%	—	17%
Civitas Institute	October 14–18, 2016	651	± 3.1%	38%	40%	—	18%
Public Policy Polling	September 18–20, 2016	1,024	± 3.1%	39%	35%	—	25%
Civitas Institute	September 11–12, 2016	600	± 4.0%	37%	35%	—	26%
Public Policy Polling	August 5–7, 2016	830	± 3.4%	39%	38%	—	23%
Civitas Institute	June 21–26, 2016	600	± 4.0%	35%	35%	—	27%
Public Policy Polling	May 20–22, 2016	928	± 3.2%	39%	38%	—	22%
RABA Research	April 27–28, 2016	688	± 3.7%	40%	33%	—	27%
Civitas Institute	April 23–25, 2016	600	± 4.0%	37%	32%	1%	30%
Public Policy Polling	March 18–20, 2016	843	± 3.4%	38%	37%	—	24%

=== Results ===
North Carolina Attorney General election, 2016
Party	Candidate	Votes	%	±%
Democratic	Josh Stein	2,303,619	50.27%	−49.73%
Republican	Buck Newton	2,279,006	49.73%	N/A
Total votes		4,582,625	100.00%	N/A
Democratic hold				
