= Rick Horner =

American politician

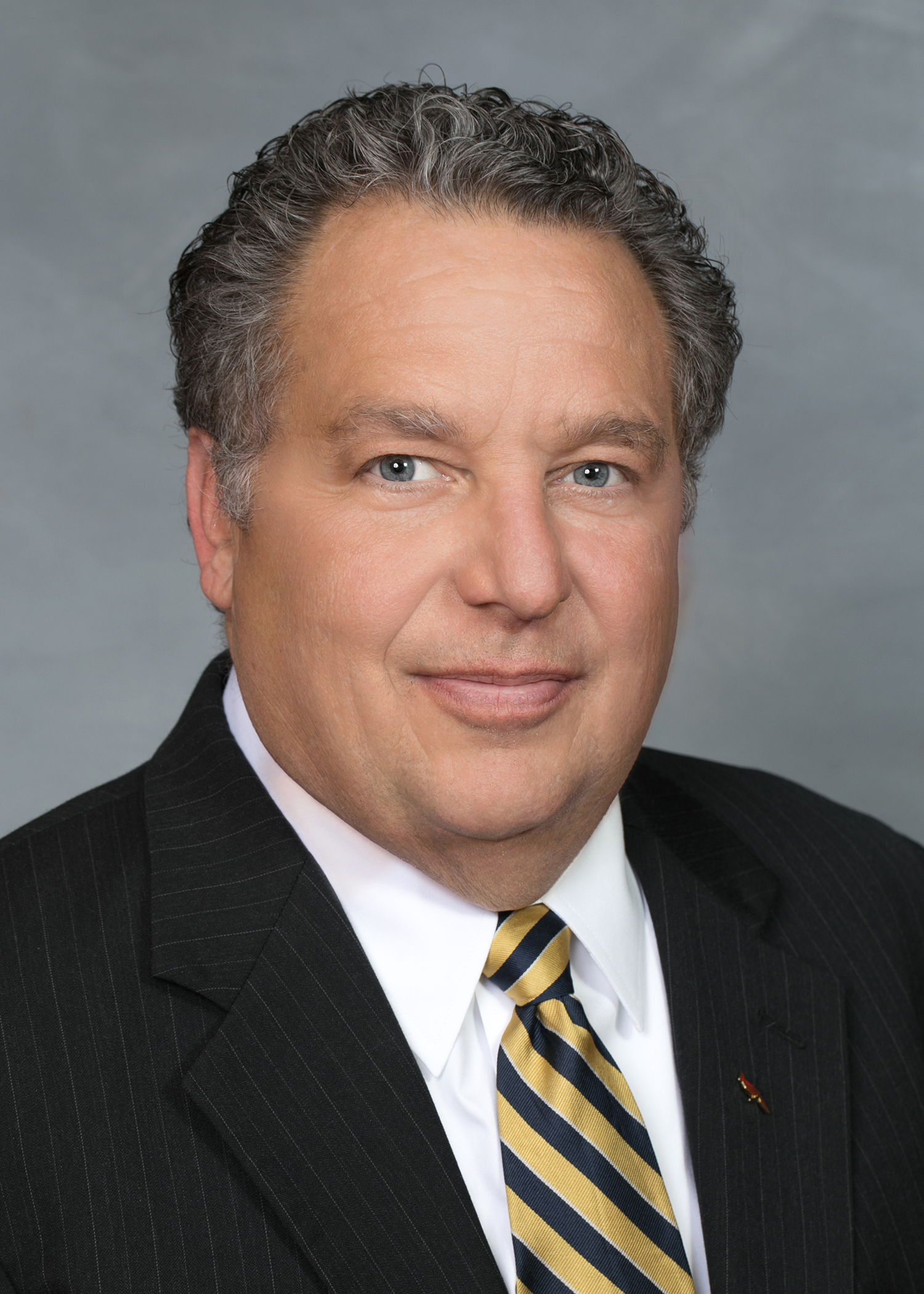

Member of the North Carolina Senate from the 11th district
- In office January 11, 2017 – January 1, 2021
- Preceded by: Buck Newton
- Succeeded by: Lisa Stone Barnes

Personal details
- Born: July 2, 1957 (age 69) Raleigh, North Carolina
- Party: Republican
- Spouse: Patricia
- Children: 4
- Education: East Carolina University
- Occupation: Financial advisor

Richard Paul Horner (born July 2, 1957) is an American politician. He was elected to the North Carolina State Senate in 2016. A Republican, he serves the 11th district.

Horner graduated from East Carolina University, where he was a member of Tau Kappa Epsilon fraternity.
