= 2016 North Carolina elections =

- November 8, 2016

North Carolina's state elections were held on November 8, 2016.

All 120 seats of the North Carolina House of Representatives and all 50 seats of the North Carolina Senate, as well as the offices of Governor, Lieutenant Governor, Attorney General, State Treasurer, and Secretary of State were up for election.

== Federal elections ==
=== Presidential ===
==== Primaries ====
===== Democratic Party =====
The North Carolina primary for the Democratic Party took place on March 15, 2016. Secretary of State Hillary Clinton beat Senator Bernie Sanders, with 54.50% of the vote to Sanders' 40.86%. Clinton received 60 of the state's delegates, with the remaining 47 going to Sanders. The Democratic primary took place on the same day as Florida, Illinois, Missouri, and Ohio.

===== Republican Party =====
The North Carolina primary for the Republican Party took place on March 15, 2016. 12 Republican candidates appeared on the ballot, of which only four; Donald Trump, Ted Cruz, John Kasich, and Marco Rubio, were still in the race. Donald Trump won the primary with 40.23% of the vote, followed by Cruz's 36.76%, Kasich's 12.67%, and Rubio's 7.73%. One withdrawn candidate, Ben Carson, received a single delegate. Trump's victory was closer than expected, as he and Cruz performed well in different metropolitan areas.

==== General election ====
Donald Trump won the state with 49.83% of the vote, with a margin of 3.66% over Hillary Clinton. Many of the predictions for North Carolina labeled it as either a tossup or leaning towards Clinton. There was an increase in turnout from 2012 for both the Democrats and Republicans.

=== Senate ===
Incumbent senator Richard Burr beat his Democratic challenger, Deborah Ross, with 51.1% of the vote. However, on election night, the polls were showing very well for Ross.

== State ==
=== General Assembly ===
==== Summary ====
Senate

Affiliation	Candidates	Votes	Vote %	Seats won	Seats %
Republican	44	2,310,285	54.86%	35 (▲1)	70%
Democratic	38	1,823,648	43.31%	15 (▼1)	30%
Libertarian	6	76,965	1.83%	0	0%
Total	88	4,210,898	100%	50	100%

House of Representatives

Affiliation	Candidates	Votes	Vote %	Seats won	Seats %
Republican	89	2,150,258	52.01%	74 (-)	61.67%
Democratic	91	1,929,942	46.68%	46 (▲1)	38.33%
Independent	3	36,273	0.88%	0 (▼1)	0%
Libertarian	6	16,102	0.39%	0	0%
Write-In	2	1,810	0.04%	0	0%
Total	191	4,134,385	100%	120	100%

==== Senate ====
District	Party	Incumbent	Status	Party	Candidate	Votes	%
1	Republican	Bill Cook	Won	Republican	Bill Cook	53,138	59.11%
1	Republican	Bill Cook	Won	Democratic	Brownie Futrell	36,759	40.89%
2	Republican	Norman W. Sanderson	Won	Republican	Norman W. Sanderson	58,032	66.29%
2	Republican	Norman W. Sanderson	Won	Democratic	Dorothea E. White	29,505	33.71%
3	Democratic	Erica Smith-Ingram	Won	Democratic	Erica Smith-Ingram	57,507	100.00%
4	Democratic	Angela R. Bryant	Won	Democratic	Angela R. Bryant	56,584	67.67%
4	Democratic	Angela R. Bryant	Won	Republican	Richard Scott	27,038	32.33%
5	Democratic	Don Davis	Won	Democratic	Don Davis	57,882	100.00%
6	Republican	Harry Brown	Won	Republican	Harry Brown	45,391	100.00%
7	Republican	Louis M. Pate Jr.	Won	Republican	Louis M. Pate Jr.	66,035	100.00%
8	Republican	Bill Rabon	Won	Republican	Bill Rabon	78,274	100.00%
9	Republican	Michael Lee	Won	Republican	Michael Lee	60,174	57.35%
9	Republican	Michael Lee	Won	Democratic	Andrew Barnhill	44,743	42.65%
10	Republican	Brent Jackson	Won	Republican	Brent Jackson	56,610	100.00%
11	Republican	Buck Newton	Retired	Republican	Rick Horner	55,765	61.17%
11	Republican	Buck Newton	Retired	Democratic	Albert Pacer	35,394	38.83%
12	Republican	Ronald Rabin	Won	Republican	Ronald Rabin	45,228	57.50%
12	Republican	Ronald Rabin	Won	Democratic	Susan Byerly	33,426	42.50%
13	Democratic	Jane W. Smith	Defeated	Republican	Danny Britt	34,126	54.98%
13	Democratic	Jane W. Smith	Defeated	Democratic	Jane W. Smith	27,940	45.02%
14	Democratic	Dan Blue	Won	Democratic	Dan Blue	73,870	100.00%
15	Republican	John Alexander	Won	Republican	John Alexander	58,999	50.01%
15	Republican	John Alexander	Won	Democratic	Laurel Deegan-Fricke	53,905	45.69%
15	Republican	John Alexander	Won	Libertarian	Brad Hessel	5,081	4.31%
16	Democratic	Jay Chaudhuri	Won	Democratic	Jay Chaudhuri	68,842	65.33%
16	Democratic	Jay Chaudhuri	Won	Republican	Eric Weaver	36,530	34.67%
17	Republican	Tamara Barringer	Won	Republican	Tamara Barringer	59,105	48.30%
17	Republican	Tamara Barringer	Won	Democratic	Susan P. Evans	58,063	47.45%
17	Republican	Tamara Barringer	Won	Libertarian	Susan J. Hogarth	5,191	4.24%
18	Republican	Chad Barefoot	Won	Republican	Chad Barefoot	57,121	55.34%
18	Republican	Chad Barefoot	Won	Democratic	Gil Johnson	46,105	44.66%
19	Republican	Wesley Meredith	Won	Republican	Wesley Meredith	40,359	56.44%
19	Republican	Wesley Meredith	Won	Democratic	Toni Morris	31,149	43.56%
20	Democratic	Floyd McKissick Jr.	Won	Democratic	Floyd McKissick Jr.	71,865	81.60%
20	Democratic	Floyd McKissick Jr.	Won	Libertarian	Barbara Howe	16,202	18.40%
21	Democratic	Ben Clark	Won	Democratic	Ben Clark	49,081	71.74%
21	Democratic	Ben Clark	Won	Republican	Dan Travieso	19,338	28.26%
22	Democratic	Mike Woodard	Won	Democratic	Mike Woodard	74,693	65.58%
22	Democratic	Mike Woodard	Won	Republican	T. Greg Doucette	39,198	34.42%
23	Democratic	Valerie P. Foushee	Won	Democratic	Valerie P. Foushee	79,520	68.06%
23	Democratic	Valerie P. Foushee	Won	Republican	Mary Lopez Carter	37,322	31.94%
24	Republican	Rick Gunn	Won	Republican	Rick Gunn	51,833	60.77%
24	Republican	Rick Gunn	Won	Democratic	John Thorpe	33,456	39.23%
25	Republican	Tom McInnis	Won	Republican	Tom McInnis	53,621	63.81%
25	Republican	Tom McInnis	Won	Democratic	Dannie M. Montgomery	30,416	36.19%
26	Republican	Phil Berger	Won	Republican	Phil Berger	67,908	100.00%
27	Republican	Trudy Wade	Won	Republican	Trudy Wade	54,512	53.32%
27	Republican	Trudy Wade	Won	Democratic	Michael Garrett	47,731	46.68%
28	Democratic	Gladys A. Robinson	Won	Democratic	Gladys A. Robinson	74,232	83.88%
28	Democratic	Gladys A. Robinson	Won	Republican	Devin R. King	14,265	16.12%
29	Republican	Jerry W. Tillman	Won	Republican	Jerry W. Tillman	71,648	100.00%
30	Republican	Shirley B. Randleman	Won	Republican	Shirley B. Randleman	59,602	72.65%
30	Republican	Shirley B. Randleman	Won	Democratic	Michael W. Holleman	22,435	27.35%
31	Republican	Joyce Krawiec	Won	Republican	Joyce Krawiec	83,599	100.00%
32	Democratic	Paul A. Lowe Jr.	Won	Democratic	Paul A. Lowe Jr.	63,691	100.00%
33	Republican	Stan Bingham	Retired	Republican	Cathy Dunn	59,367	71.38%
33	Republican	Stan Bingham	Retired	Democratic	Jim Beall Graham	23,809	28.62%
34	Republican	Andrew C. Brock	Won	Republican	Andrew C. Brock	69,470	100.00%
35	Republican	Tommy Tucker	Won	Republican	Tommy Tucker	73,032	100.00%
36	Republican	Fletcher Hartsell	Retired	Republican	Paul R. Newton	59,584	62.56%
36	Republican	Fletcher Hartsell	Retired	Democratic	Robert Brown	35,664	37.44%
37	Democratic	Jeff Jackson	Won	Democratic	Jeff Jackson	57,804	67.94%
37	Democratic	Jeff Jackson	Won	Republican	Bob Diamond	27,279	32.06%
38	Democratic	Joel Ford	Won	Democratic	Joel Ford	67,059	79.06%
38	Democratic	Joel Ford	Won	Republican	Richard Rivette	17,764	20.94%
39	Republican	Bob Rucho	Retired	Republican	Dan Bishop	58,739	56.81%
39	Republican	Bob Rucho	Retired	Democratic	Lloyd Scher	44,655	43.19%
40	Democratic	Joyce Waddell	Won	Democratic	Joyce Waddell	61,481	82.51%
40	Democratic	Joyce Waddell	Won	Republican	Marguerite Cooke	13,032	17.49%
41	Republican	Jeff Tarte	Won	Republican	Jeff Tarte	55,519	54.48%
41	Republican	Jeff Tarte	Won	Democratic	Jonathan Hudson	41,453	40.68%
41	Republican	Jeff Tarte	Won	Libertarian	Chris Cole	4,938	4.85%
42	Republican	Andy Wells	Won	Republican	Andy Wells	69,301	100.00%
43	Republican	Kathy Harrington	Won	Republican	Kathy Harrington	65,054	100.00%
44	Republican	David L. Curtis	Won	Republican	David L. Curtis	71,114	77.30%
44	Republican	David L. Curtis	Won	Libertarian	Nic Haag	20,881	22.70%
45	Republican	Deanna Ballard	Won	Republican	Deanna Ballard	56,758	65.00%
45	Republican	Deanna Ballard	Won	Democratic	Art Sherwood	30,559	35.00%
47	Republican	Ralph Hise	Won	Republican	Ralph Hise	56,021	64.85%
47	Republican	Ralph Hise	Won	Democratic	Mary Jane Boyd	30,364	35.15%
46	Republican	Warren Daniel	Won	Republican	Warren Daniel	52,997	66.16%
46	Republican	Warren Daniel	Won	Democratic	Anne Fischer	27,106	33.84%
48	Republican	Chuck Edwards	Won	Republican	Chuck Edwards	61,455	62.04%
48	Republican	Chuck Edwards	Won	Democratic	Norman Bossert	37,596	37.96%
49	Democratic	Terry Van Duyn	Won	Democratic	Terry Van Duyn	71,828	74.43%
49	Democratic	Terry Van Duyn	Won	Libertarian	William Meredith	24,672	25.57%
50	Republican	Jim Davis	Won	Republican	Jim Davis	59,028	62.46%
50	Republican	Jim Davis	Won	Democratic	Jane Hipps	35,476	37.54%

==== House of Representatives ====
District	Party	Incumbent	Status	Party	Candidate	Votes	%
1	Republican	Bob Steinburg	Won	Republican	Bob Steinburg	25,363	64.04%
1	Republican	Bob Steinburg	Won	Democratic	Sam Davis	14,240	35.96%
2	Republican	Larry Yarborough	Won	Republican	Larry Yarborough	22,760	60.64%
2	Republican	Larry Yarborough	Won	Democratic	Joe Parrish	14,775	39.36%
3	Republican	Michael Speciale	Won	Republican	Michael Speciale	23,273	64.81%
3	Republican	Michael Speciale	Won	Democratic	Marva Fisher Baldwin	12,638	35.19%
4	Republican	Jimmy Dixon	Won	Republican	Jimmy Dixon	24,646	100.00%
5	Democratic	Howard J. Hunter III	Won	Democratic	Howard J. Hunter III	25,961	100.00%
6	Independent	Paul Tine	Retired	Republican	Beverly Boswell	22,022	51.83%
6	Independent	Paul Tine	Retired	Democratic	Warren Judge	20,471	48.17%
7	Democratic	Bobbie J. Richardson	Won	Democratic	Bobbie J. Richardson	23,329	67.81%
7	Democratic	Bobbie J. Richardson	Won	Republican	William Duke Hancock II	11,072	32.19%
8	Republican	Susan Martin	Won	Republican	Susan Martin	21,329	50.19%
8	Republican	Susan Martin	Won	Democratic	Charlie Pat Farris	21,166	49.81%
9	Republican	Greg Murphy	Won	Republican	Greg Murphy	22,869	57.35%
9	Republican	Greg Murphy	Won	Democratic	Brian Farkas	17,007	42.65%
10	Republican	John R. Bell	Won	Republican	John R. Bell	26,440	71.55%
10	Republican	John R. Bell	Won	Democratic	Evelyn Paul	10,514	28.45%
11	Democratic	Duane Hall	Won	Democratic	Duane Hall	24,624	60.88%
11	Democratic	Duane Hall	Won	Republican	Ray Martin	12,924	31.95%
11	Democratic	Duane Hall	Won	Libertarian	Brian Lewis	2,897	7.16%
12	Democratic	George Graham	Won	Democratic	George Graham	23,689	100.00%
13	Republican	Patricia (Pat) McElraft	Won	Republican	Patricia (Pat) McElraft	29,188	70.82%
13	Republican	Patricia (Pat) McElraft	Won	Democratic	Rodney Alexander	12,024	29.18%
14	Republican	George G. Cleveland	Won	Republican	George G. Cleveland	18,908	100.00%
15	Republican	Phillip Shepard	Won	Republican	Phillip Shepard	13,273	69.60%
15	Republican	Phillip Shepard	Won	Democratic	Dan Whitten	5,797	30.40%
16	Republican	Chris W. Millis	Won	Republican	Chris W. Millis	23,649	66.98%
16	Republican	Chris W. Millis	Won	Democratic	Steve Unger	11,656	33.02%
17	Republican	Frank Iler	Won	Republican	Frank Iler	32,757	66.44%
17	Republican	Frank Iler	Won	Democratic	Charles Warren	16,549	33.56%
18	Democratic	Susi Hamilton	Won	Democratic	Susi Hamilton	22,006	61.10%
18	Democratic	Susi Hamilton	Won	Republican	Gerald (Jerry) Benton	14,011	38.90%
19	Republican	Ted Davis Jr.	Won	Republican	Ted Davis Jr.	31,133	100.00%
20	Republican	Holly Grange	Won	Republican	Holly Grange	32,576	100.00%
21	Democratic	Larry M. Bell	Won	Democratic	Larry M. Bell	24,564	100.00%
22	Democratic	William Brisson	Won	Democratic	William Brisson	21,091	100.00%
23	Democratic	Shelly Willingham	Won	Democratic	Shelly Willingham	27,208	100.00%
24	Democratic	Jean Farmer-Butterfield	Won	Democratic	Jean Farmer-Butterfield	26,895	100.00%
25	Republican	Jeffrey L. (Jeff) Collins	Won	Republican	Jeffrey L. (Jeff) Collins	27,969	68.10%
25	Republican	Jeffrey L. (Jeff) Collins	Won	Democratic	James D. Gailliard	13,099	31.90%
26	Republican	N. Leo Daughtry	Retired	Republican	Donna McDowell White	25,899	58.05%
26	Republican	N. Leo Daughtry	Retired	Democratic	Rich Nixon	18,716	41.95%
27	Democratic	Michael H. Wray	Won	Democratic	Michael H. Wray	29,200	100.00%
28	Republican	James Langdon Jr.	Retired	Republican	Larry C. Strickland	26,161	70.59%
28	Republican	James Langdon Jr.	Retired	Democratic	Patricia Oliver	10,897	29.41%
29	Democratic	Larry D. Hall	Won	Democratic	Larry D. Hall	39,607	100.00%
30	Democratic	Paul Luebke	Won	Democratic	Paul Luebke	37,094	73.85%
30	Democratic	Paul Luebke	Won	Republican	Elissa Fuchs	13,132	26.15%
31	Democratic	Mickey Michaux	Won	Democratic	Mickey Michaux	34,540	100.00%
32	Democratic	Nathan Baskerville	Retired	Democratic	Terry Garrison	29,142	100.00%
33	Democratic	Rosa U. Gill	Won	Democratic	Rosa U. Gill	33,094	100.00%
34	Democratic	Grier Martin	Won	Democratic	Grier Martin	31,335	67.56%
34	Democratic	Grier Martin	Won	Republican	Bill Morris	15,049	32.44%
35	Republican	Chris Malone	Won	Republican	Chris Malone	25,117	53.14%
35	Republican	Chris Malone	Won	Democratic	Terence Everitt	22,145	46.86%
36	Republican	Nelson Dollar	Won	Republican	Nelson Dollar	25,295	49.26%
36	Republican	Nelson Dollar	Won	Democratic	Jennifer Ferrell	23,875	46.49%
36	Republican	Nelson Dollar	Won	Libertarian	Brian Irving	2,184	4.25%
37	Republican	Paul Stam	Retired	Republican	Linda Hunt Williams	27,448	52.29%
37	Republican	Paul Stam	Retired	Democratic	Randy Barrow	22,569	43.00%
37	Republican	Paul Stam	Retired	Libertarian	Robert Rose	2,474	4.71%
38	Democratic	Yvonne Lewis Holley	Won	Democratic	Yvonne Lewis Holley	28,990	84.80%
38	Democratic	Yvonne Lewis Holley	Won	Libertarian	Olen Watson III	5,196	15.20%
39	Democratic	Darren Jackson	Won	Democratic	Darren Jackson	31,901	100.00%
40	Republican	Marilyn Avila	Defeated	Democratic	Joe John	23,786	50.41%
40	Republican	Marilyn Avila	Defeated	Republican	Marilyn Avila	23,402	49.59%
41	Democratic	Gale Adcock	Won	Democratic	Gale Adcock	27,491	56.99%
41	Democratic	Gale Adcock	Won	Republican	Chris M. Shoffner	20,745	43.01%
42	Democratic	Marvin W. Lucas	Won	Democratic	Marvin W. Lucas	24,213	100.00%
43	Democratic	Elmer Floyd	Won	Democratic	Elmer Floyd	27,121	100.00%
44	Democratic	William (Billy) Richardson	Won	Democratic	William (Billy) Richardson	15,433	50.57%
44	Democratic	William (Billy) Richardson	Won	Republican	Jim Arp	15,086	49.43%
45	Republican	John Szoka	Won	Republican	John Szoka	23,495	100.00%
46	Democratic	Ken Waddell	Retired	Republican	Brenden Jones	19,607	60.34%
46	Democratic	Ken Waddell	Retired	Democratic	Tim Benton	11,836	36.42%
46	Democratic	Ken Waddell	Retired	Libertarian	Thomas (Tom) Howell Jr.	1,052	3.24%
47	Democratic	Charles Graham	Won	Democratic	Charles Graham	17,366	100.00%
48	Democratic	Garland E. Pierce	Won	Democratic	Garland E. Pierce	24,076	100.00%
49	Democratic	Cynthia Ball	Won	Democratic	Cynthia Ball	26,975	48.67%
49	Democratic	Cynthia Ball	Won	Republican	Gary Pendleton	26,155	47.19%
49	Democratic	Cynthia Ball	Won	Libertarian	David Ulmer	2,299	4.15%
50	Democratic	Graig R. Meyer	Won	Democratic	Graig R. Meyer	27,278	57.28%
50	Democratic	Graig R. Meyer	Won	Republican	Rod Chaney	20,347	42.72%
51	Republican	John Sauls	Won	Republican	John Sauls	17,904	55.66%
51	Republican	John Sauls	Won	Democratic	Brad Salmon	14,262	44.34%
52	Republican	Jamie Boles	Won	Republican	Jamie Boles	31,146	100.00%
53	Republican	David R. Lewis	Won	Republican	David R. Lewis	19,548	60.66%
53	Republican	David R. Lewis	Won	Democratic	Jon Blum	12,678	39.34%
54	Democratic	Robert T. Reives II	Won	Democratic	Robert T. Reives II	24,773	57.20%
54	Democratic	Robert T. Reives II	Won	Republican	Wesley Seawell	18,534	42.80%
55	Republican	Mark Brody	Won	Republican	Mark Brody	20,901	60.37%
55	Republican	Mark Brody	Won	Democratic	Kim Hargett	13,719	39.63%
56	Democratic	Verla Insko	Won	Democratic	Verla Insko	43,144	100.00%
57	Democratic	Mary (Pricey) Harrison	Won	Democratic	Mary (Pricey) Harrison	31,518	100.00%
58	Democratic	Ralph Johnson	Died in office	Democratic	Amos Quick	35,176	100.00%
59	Republican	Jon Hardister	Won	Republican	Jon Hardister	28,980	60.32%
59	Republican	Jon Hardister	Won	Democratic	Scott A. Jones	19,060	39.68%
60	Democratic	Cecil Brockman	Won	Democratic	Cecil Brockman	27,035	100.00%
61	Republican	John Faircloth	Won	Republican	John Faircloth	31,767	100.00%
62	Republican	John M. Blust	Won	Republican	John M. Blust	32,010	100.00%
63	Republican	Stephen Ross	Won	Republican	Stephen Ross	26,068	100.00%
64	Republican	Dennis Riddell	Won	Republican	Dennis Riddell	23,857	100.00%
65	Republican	Bert Jones	Won	Republican	Bert Jones	21,857	60.39%
65	Republican	Bert Jones	Won	Democratic	H. Keith Duncan	14,336	39.61%
66	Democratic	Ken Goodman	Won	Democratic	Ken Goodman	23,396	100.00%
67	Republican	Justin P. Burr	Won	Republican	Justin P. Burr	20,421	53.25%
67	Republican	Justin P. Burr	Won	Democratic	Carson Roger Snyder	10,637	27.74%
67	Republican	Justin P. Burr	Won	Independent	Billy Mills	7,288	19.01%
68	Republican	Craig Horn	Won	Republican	Craig Horn	30,953	100.00%
69	Republican	Dean Arp	Won	Republican	Dean Arp	23,249	66.01%
69	Republican	Dean Arp	Won	Democratic	Gordon B. Daniels	11,970	33.99%
70	Republican	Pat B. Hurley	Won	Republican	Pat B. Hurley	24,856	76.14%
70	Republican	Pat B. Hurley	Won	Democratic	Lois Bohnsack	7,789	23.86%
71	Democratic	Evelyn Terry	Won	Democratic	Evelyn Terry	25,414	100.00%
72	Democratic	Edward Hanes Jr.	Won	Democratic	Edward Hanes Jr.	28,192	100.00%
73	Republican	Lee Zachary	Won	Republican	Lee Zachary	30,354	100.00%
74	Republican	Debra Conrad	Won	Republican	Debra Conrad	27,209	63.52%
74	Republican	Debra Conrad	Won	Democratic	Marilynn Baker	15,626	36.48%
75	Republican	Donny C. Lambeth	Won	Republican	Donny C. Lambeth	30,831	100.00%
76	Republican	Carl Ford	Won	Republican	Carl Ford	29,590	100.00%
77	Republican	Harry Warren	Won	Republican	Harry Warren	27,699	100.00%
78	Republican	Allen McNeill	Won	Republican	Allen McNeill	27,040	78.11%
78	Republican	Allen McNeill	Won	Democratic	William (Bill) Mccaskill	7,579	21.89%
79	Republican	Julia Craven Howard	Won	Republican	Julia Craven Howard	31,255	100.00%
80	Republican	Sam Watford	Won	Republican	Sam Watford	31,287	100.00%
81	Republican	Rayne Brown	Retired	Republican	Larry W. Potts	24,379	68.07%
81	Republican	Rayne Brown	Retired	Democratic	Andy Hedrick	11,438	31.93%
82	Republican	Larry G. Pittman	Won	Republican	Larry G. Pittman	24,636	57.92%
82	Republican	Larry G. Pittman	Won	Democratic	Earle Schecter	17,900	42.08%
83	Republican	Linda P. Johnson	Won	Republican	Linda P. Johnson	22,927	63.10%
83	Republican	Linda P. Johnson	Won	Democratic	Jeremy Hachen	13,407	36.90%
84	Republican	Rena W. Turner	Won	Republican	Rena W. Turner	25,414	69.29%
84	Republican	Rena W. Turner	Won	Democratic	John Wayne Kahl	11,266	30.71%
85	Republican	Josh Dobson	Won	Republican	Josh Dobson	29,064	100.00%
86	Republican	Hugh Blackwell	Won	Republican	Hugh Blackwell	21,226	62.44%
86	Republican	Hugh Blackwell	Won	Democratic	Tim Barnsback	12,766	37.56%
87	Republican	George Robinson	Defeated in primary	Republican	Destin Hall	29,066	94.14%
87	Republican	George Robinson	Defeated in primary	N/A	Terri M. Johnson (write-in)	1,279	4.14%
87	Republican	George Robinson	Defeated in primary	N/A	Write-In	531	1.72%
88	Republican	Rob Bryan	Defeated	Democratic	Mary Belk	21,754	50.54%
88	Republican	Rob Bryan	Defeated	Republican	Rob Bryan	21,286	49.46%
89	Republican	Mitchell Smith Setzer	Won	Republican	Mitchell Smith Setzer	28,409	100.00%
90	Republican	Sarah Stevens	Won	Republican	Sarah Stevens	23,678	73.26%
90	Republican	Sarah Stevens	Won	Democratic	Vera Smith Reynolds	8,641	26.74%
91	Republican	Kyle Hall	Won	Republican	Kyle Hall	24,639	66.47%
91	Republican	Kyle Hall	Won	Democratic	Eugene Russell	12,430	33.53%
92	Republican	Beth Danae Caulfield	Defeated	Democratic	Chaz Beasley	22,941	54.38%
92	Republican	Beth Danae Caulfield	Defeated	Republican	Beth Danae Caulfield	19,246	45.62%
93	Republican	Jonathan C. Jordan	Won	Republican	Jonathan C. Jordan	21,910	53.00%
93	Republican	Jonathan C. Jordan	Won	Democratic	Sue Counts	19,433	47.00%
94	Republican	Jeffrey Elmore	Won	Republican	Jeffrey Elmore	24,467	74.51%
94	Republican	Jeffrey Elmore	Won	Democratic	Michael T. Lentz	8,372	25.49%
95	Republican	John A. Fraley	Won	Republican	John A. Fraley	33,298	100.00%
96	Republican	Jay Adams	Won	Republican	Jay Adams	26,595	100.00%
97	Republican	Jason R. Saine	Won	Republican	Jason R. Saine	31,390	100.00%
98	Republican	John R. Bradford III	Won	Republican	John R. Bradford III	25,428	56.48%
98	Republican	John R. Bradford III	Won	Independent	Jane Campbell	19,597	43.52%
99	Democratic	Rodney W. Moore	Won	Democratic	Rodney W. Moore	28,838	100.00%
100	Democratic	Tricia Cotham	Retired	Democratic	John Autry	25,736	100.00%
101	Democratic	Beverly Miller Earle	Won	Democratic	Beverly Miller Earle	27,476	75.97%
101	Democratic	Beverly Miller Earle	Won	Republican	Justin Dunn	8,691	24.03%
102	Democratic	Becky Carney	Won	Democratic	Becky Carney	27,836	100.00%
103	Republican	Bill Brawley	Won	Republican	Bill Brawley	21,702	56.19%
103	Republican	Bill Brawley	Won	Democratic	Rochelle Rivas	16,922	43.81%
104	Republican	Dan Bishop	Retired	Republican	Andy Dulin	24,700	55.32%
104	Republican	Dan Bishop	Retired	Democratic	Peter Noris	19,952	44.68%
105	Republican	Scott Stone	Won	Republican	Scott Stone	21,853	55.27%
105	Republican	Scott Stone	Won	Democratic	Connie Green-Johnson	17,689	44.73%
106	Democratic	Carla Cunningham	Won	Democratic	Carla Cunningham	27,247	100.00%
107	Democratic	Kelly Alexander	Won	Democratic	Kelly Alexander	34,305	100.00%
108	Republican	John A. Torbett	Won	Republican	John A. Torbett	24,636	100.00%
109	Republican	Dana Bumgardner	Won	Republican	Dana Bumgardner	21,687	61.19%
109	Republican	Dana Bumgardner	Won	Democratic	Susan Maxon	13,755	38.81%
110	Republican	Kelly Hastings	Won	Republican	Kelly Hastings	24,931	100.00%
111	Republican	Tim Moore	Won	Republican	Tim Moore	25,398	100.00%
112	Republican	David Rogers	Won	Republican	David Rogers	22,938	70.96%
112	Republican	David Rogers	Won	Independent	Ben Edwards	9,388	29.04%
113	Republican	Chris Whitmire	Retired	Republican	Cody Henson	26,848	61.61%
113	Republican	Chris Whitmire	Retired	Democratic	Maureen Mahan Copelof	16,726	38.39%
114	Democratic	Susan C. Fisher	Won	Democratic	Susan C. Fisher	39,243	100.00%
115	Democratic	John Ager	Won	Democratic	John Ager	25,257	55.58%
115	Democratic	John Ager	Won	Republican	Frank Moretz	20,183	44.42%
116	Democratic	Brian Turner	Won	Democratic	Brian Turner	28,014	100.00%
117	Republican	Chuck McGrady	Won	Republican	Chuck McGrady	30,659	100.00%
118	Republican	Michele D. Presnell	Won	Republican	Michele D. Presnell	21,754	55.35%
118	Republican	Michele D. Presnell	Won	Democratic	Rhonda Cole Schandevel	17,549	44.65%
119	Democratic	Joe Sam Queen	Defeated	Republican	Mike Clampitt	17,757	50.39%
119	Democratic	Joe Sam Queen	Defeated	Democratic	Joe Sam Queen	17,480	49.61%
120	Republican	Roger West	Retired	Republican	Kevin Corbin	29,047	72.03%
120	Republican	Roger West	Retired	Democratic	Randy Hogsed	11,282	27.97%

Source: North Carolina State Board of Elections, Ballotpedia
