= 2016 United States presidential election in North Carolina =

- November 8, 2016
- Turnout: 68.98% (▲0.58 pp)

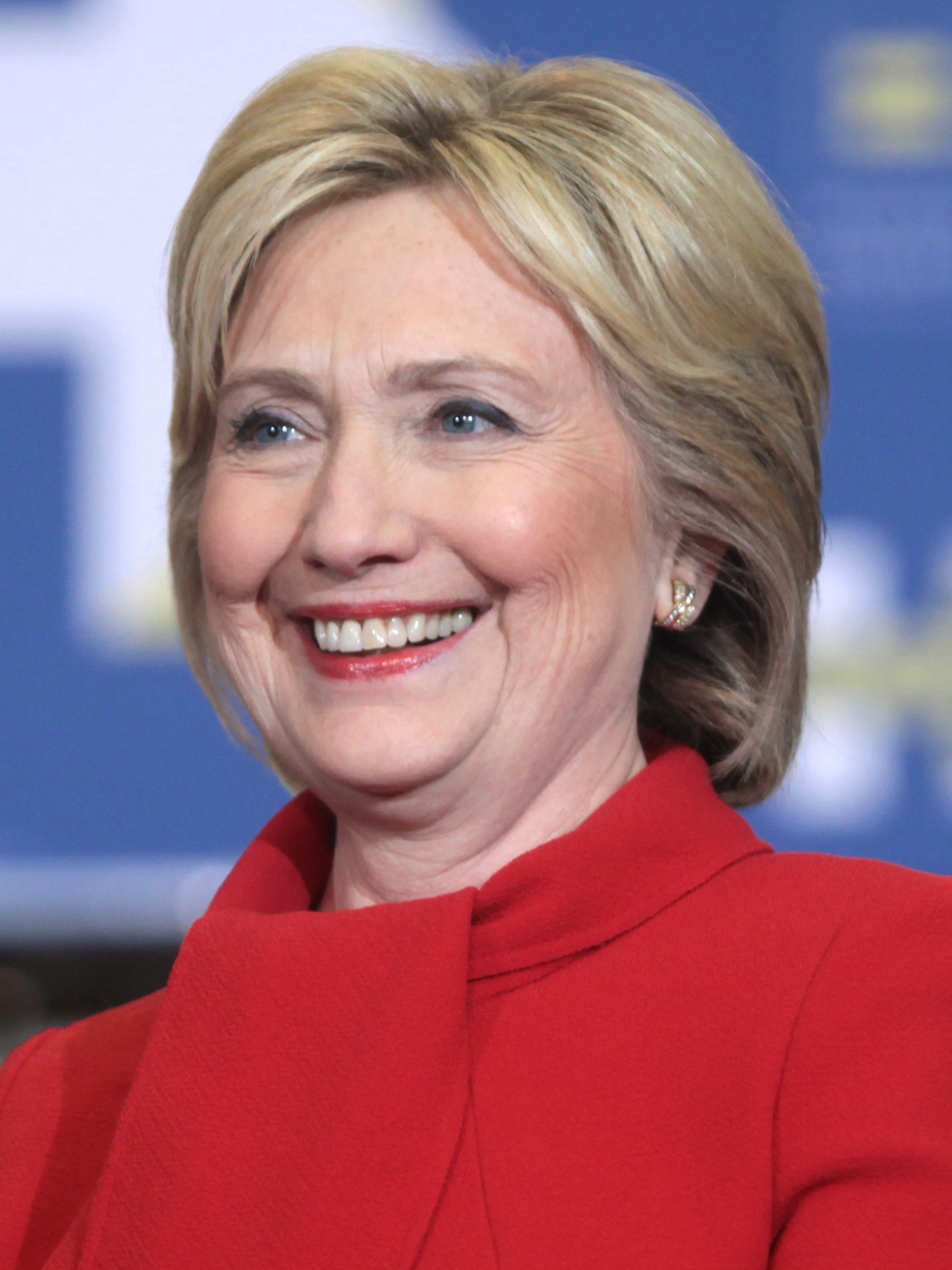
Nominee	Donald Trump	Hillary Clinton
Party	Republican	Democratic
Home state	New York	New York
Running mate	Mike Pence	Tim Kaine
Electoral vote	15	0
Popular vote	2,362,631	2,189,316
Percentage	49.83%	46.17%

Trump
40–50%
50–60%
60–70%
70–80%
80–90%
90–100%
Clinton
40–50%
50–60%
60–70%
70–80%
80–90%
90–100%
Tie
President before election
Barack Obama
Democratic
Elected President
Donald Trump
Republican

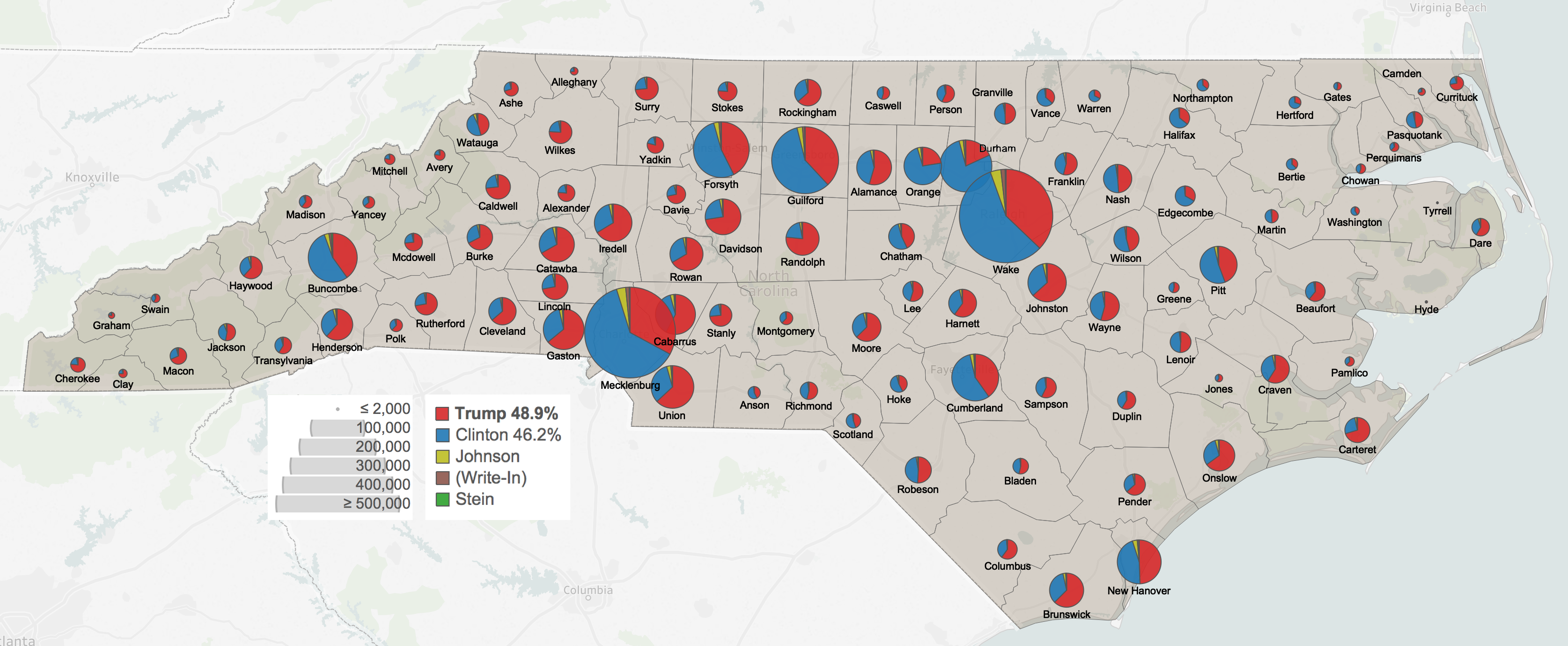
Results by county showing number of votes by size and candidates by color

Treemap of the popular vote by county.

The 2016 United States presidential election in North Carolina was held on Tuesday, November 8, 2016, as part of the 2016 United States presidential election in which all 50 states plus the District of Columbia participated. North Carolina voters chose electors to represent them in the Electoral College via a popular vote, pitting the Republican Party's nominee, businessman Donald Trump, and running mate Indiana Governor Mike Pence against Democratic Party nominee, former Secretary of State Hillary Clinton, and her running mate Virginia Senator Tim Kaine. North Carolina had 15 electoral votes in the Electoral College.

Trump won the state with 49.83% of the vote, a small decrease from Mitt Romney's vote percentage in 2012. However, he won by a margin of 3.66%, an increase of 1.62% compared to Romney's margin in 2012. In contrast, Clinton obtained 46.17% of the vote, a decrease of over 2% in 2012 when Obama won 48.35% of the vote. Although both candidates saw decreases in vote share compared to 2012, Trump and Clinton both obtained more votes than the previous election's candidates due to a higher voter turnout in this election. Trump flipped seven counties to the Republican column and was the first Republican to win Robeson, Richmond, and Gates counties since Richard Nixon in 1972. Clinton flipped just one county to the Democratic column, Watauga County, home to Boone.

Trump became the first Republican to win the White House without carrying Watauga County since James A. Garfield in 1880, as well as the first to do so without carrying Bumcombe or Forsyth counties since Calvin Coolidge in 1924, the first to do so without carrying Wake County since Dwight D. Eisenhower in 1956, and the first to do so without carrying Pitt or Wilson counties since Richard Nixon in 1968. It was also the first time since 1980 that North Carolina voted more Democratic than Ohio.

== Primary elections ==
The Democratic, Republican, and Libertarian primaries were on March 15, 2016. In North Carolina, registered members of each party only voted in their party's primary, while voters who were unaffiliated chose any one primary in which to vote.

=== Democratic primary ===
County results of the North Carolina Democratic presidential primary, 2016. Hillary Clinton Bernie Sanders

Four candidates appeared on the Democratic presidential primary ballot:

- Martin O'Malley (withdrawn)
- Bernie Sanders
- Hillary Clinton
- Rocky De La Fuente

==== Polling ====
According to a WRAL-TV/SurveyUSA poll conducted the week before the primary: "[Hillary] Clinton holds a commanding lead of 57% to 34% among likely Democratic voters over U.S. Sen. Bernie Sanders of Vermont."

==== Results ====
Democratic primary results
Party	Candidate	Votes	%
Democratic	Hillary Clinton	616,758	54.59%
Democratic	Bernie Sanders	460,434	40.75%
Democratic	No Preference	37,200	3.29%
Democratic	Others (total)	15,375	1.37%
Total votes		1,129,767	100.00%

=== Republican primary ===
Republican primary results by county. Donald Trump: 30–40%; 40–50%; 50–60%; 60–70%; Ted Cruz: 30–40%; 40–50%; 50–60%

Twelve candidates appeared on the Republican presidential primary ballot:

- Jeb Bush (withdrawn)
- Ben Carson (withdrawn)
- Chris Christie (withdrawn)
- Ted Cruz
- Carly Fiorina (withdrawn)
- Jim Gilmore (withdrawn)
- Mike Huckabee (withdrawn)
- John Kasich
- Rand Paul (withdrawn)
- Marco Rubio
- Rick Santorum (withdrawn)
- Donald Trump

==== Polling ====
According to a WRAL-TV/SurveyUSA poll conducted the week before the primary: "[Donald] Trump tops U.S. Sen. Ted Cruz of Texas 41% to 27% among likely GOP voters. U.S. Sen. Marco Rubio of Florida and Ohio Gov. John Kasich trail far behind, at 14% and 11%, respectively."

==== Results ====
North Carolina Republican primary, March 15, 2016
Candidate	Votes	Percentage	Actual delegate count		
Candidate	Votes	Percentage	Bound	Unbound	Total
Donald Trump	462,413	40.23%	29	0	29
Ted Cruz	422,621	36.76%	27	0	27
John Kasich	145,659	12.67%	9	0	9
Marco Rubio	88,907	7.73%	6	0	6
Ben Carson (withdrawn)	11,019	0.96%	1	0	1
No Preference	6,081	0.53%	0	0	0
Jeb Bush (withdrawn)	3,893	0.34%	0	0	0
Mike Huckabee (withdrawn)	3,071	0.27%	0	0	0
Rand Paul (withdrawn)	2,753	0.24%	0	0	0
Chris Christie (withdrawn)	1,256	0.11%	0	0	0
Carly Fiorina (withdrawn)	929	0.08%	0	0	0
Rick Santorum (withdrawn)	663	0.06%	0	0	0
Jim Gilmore (withdrawn)	265	0.02%	0	0	0
Unprojected delegates:			0	0	0
Total:	1,149,530	100.00%	72	0	72
Source: The Green Papers

Trump managed to pull off a closer than expected win due to both Cruz and his campaigns performances in different metropolitan areas. Trump was strongest in the Charlotte, Fayetteville and Wilmington areas. Cruz did best in Greensboro, Asheville and the Research Triangle region, where North Carolina's major colleges and capital of Raleigh are located.

=== Libertarian primary ===
2016 North Carolina Libertarian primary
- March 15, 2016
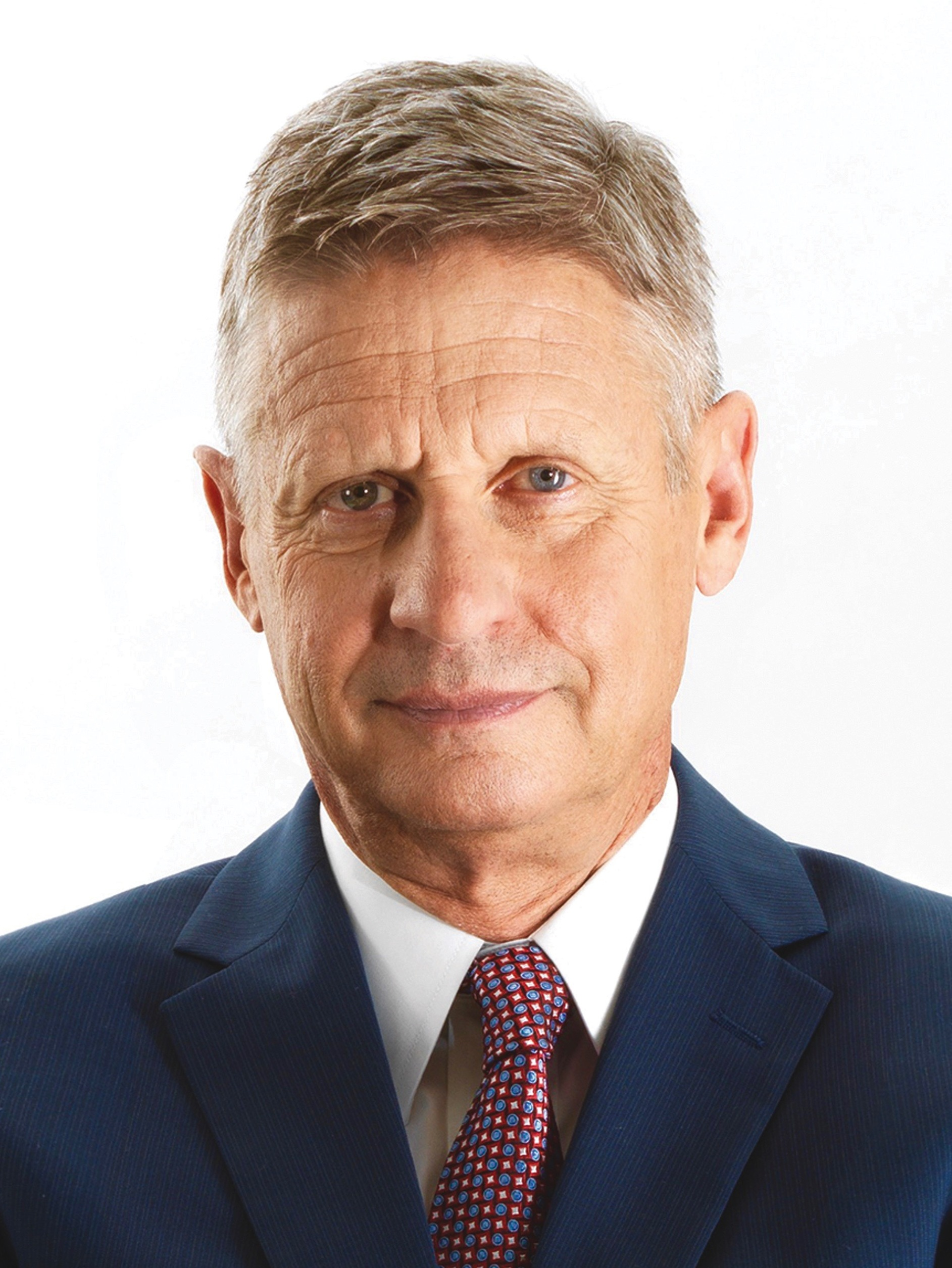

Candidate	Gary Johnson	No Preference
Home state	New Mexico	n/a
Popular vote	2,414	2,067
Percentage	41.48%	35.52%
Candidate	John Hale	Joy Waymire
Home state	Kentucky	California
Popular vote	329	268
Percentage	5.65%	4.61%
- North Carolina results by county Gary Johnson No Preference Tie

Eleven candidates appeared on the Libertarian presidential primary ballot:

- John David Hale
- Cecil Ince
- Gary Johnson
- Steve Kerbel
- Darryl W. Perry
- Austin Petersen
- Derrick Michael Reid
- Jack Robinson Jr.
- Rhett Smith
- Joy Waymire
- Marc Allan Feldman

=== Results ===
North Carolina Libertarian presidential primary, March 15, 2016
Candidate	Votes	Percentage
Gary Johnson	2,414	41.48%
No Preference	2,067	35.52%
John David Hale	329	5.65%
Joy Waymire	268	4.61%
Austin Petersen	189	3.25%
Darryl Perry	118	2.03%
Steve Kerbel	109	1.87%
Derrick Michael Reid	74	1.27%
Cecil Ince	72	1%
Jack Robinson Jr.	70	1.20%
Marc Allan Feldman	66	1.13%
Rhett Smith	43	0.74%
Total	5,739	100%

== General election ==
=== Predictions ===
Source	Ranking	As of
CNN	Tossup	November 4, 2016
Cook Political Report	Tossup	November 7, 2016
Electoral-vote.com	Lean D (flip)	November 8, 2016
NBC	Tossup	November 7, 2016
RealClearPolitics	Tossup	November 8, 2016
Rothenberg Political Report	Tilt D (flip)	November 7, 2016
Sabato's Crystal Ball	Lean D (flip)	November 7, 2016

=== Polling ===
Up until the summer of 2016, both Democrat Hillary Clinton and Republican Donald Trump were each winning polls, with Trump leading slightly. From late June 2016 to mid September 2016, Clinton gained momentum and had won most polls conducted in the summer. From mid September 2016 to late October, Clinton's momentum increased as she won every poll but one. The latest polls showed a near tie, with both almost evenly matched. The average of the final 3 polls showed Clinton ahead 46% to 45%. While she had a head-to-head lead in the last polls against Trump, polls with Gary Johnson showed the race a lot closer. The last New York Times poll conducted showed Trump and Clinton tied with 44% for each.

=== Candidates ===
In addition to Clinton, Johnson and Trump, Green Party nominee Jill Stein was granted write-in status by the North Carolina State Board of Elections, the only write-in candidate to qualify.

=== Results ===
State senate district results: Trump 50–60% 60–70% 70–80% / Clinton 50–60% 60–70% 70–80% 80–90%

2016 United States presidential election in North Carolina
Party	Candidate	Votes	%
Republican	Donald Trump	2,362,631	49.83%
Democratic	Hillary Clinton	2,189,316	46.17%
Libertarian	Gary Johnson	130,126	2.74%
Write-in		47,386	1.00%
Green	Jill Stein (write-in)	12,105	0.26%
Total votes		4,741,564	100.00%

==== By county ====
County	Donald Trump Republican		Hillary Clinton Democratic		Various candidates Other parties		Margin		Total
County	#	%	#	%	#	%	#	%	Total
Alamance	38,815	54.55%	29,833	41.93%	2,509	3.52%	8,982	12.62%	71,157
Alexander	13,893	76.04%	3,767	20.62%	611	3.34%	10,126	55.42%	18,271
Alleghany	3,814	71.76%	1,306	24.57%	195	3.67%	2,508	47.19%	5,315
Anson	4,506	42.73%	5,859	55.56%	180	1.71%	-1,353	-12.83%	10,545
Ashe	9,412	70.11%	3,500	26.07%	512	3.82%	5,912	44.04%	13,424
Avery	6,298	76.35%	1,689	20.48%	262	3.17%	4,609	55.87%	8,249
Beaufort	14,543	60.75%	8,764	36.61%	631	2.64%	5,779	24.14%	23,938
Bertie	3,456	36.97%	5,778	61.82%	113	1.21%	-2,322	-24.85%	9,347
Bladen	8,550	53.78%	7,058	44.40%	289	1.82%	1,492	9.38%	15,897
Brunswick	42,720	62.50%	23,282	34.06%	2,349	3.44%	19,438	28.44%	68,351
Buncombe	55,716	40.10%	75,452	54.30%	7,779	5.60%	-19,736	-14.20%	138,947
Burke	26,238	67.42%	11,251	28.91%	1,431	3.67%	14,987	38.51%	38,920
Cabarrus	53,819	57.69%	35,521	38.08%	3,949	4.23%	18,298	19.61%	93,289
Caldwell	26,621	73.30%	8,425	23.20%	1,274	3.50%	18,196	50.10%	36,320
Camden	3,546	70.83%	1,274	25.45%	186	3.72%	2,272	45.38%	5,006
Carteret	26,569	70.32%	9,939	26.31%	1,273	3.37%	16,630	44.01%	37,781
Caswell	6,026	54.44%	4,792	43.29%	252	2.27%	1,234	11.15%	11,070
Catawba	48,324	66.79%	21,216	29.32%	2,811	3.89%	27,108	37.47%	72,351
Chatham	17,105	42.92%	21,065	52.86%	1,679	4.22%	-3,960	-9.94%	39,849
Cherokee	10,844	76.47%	2,860	20.17%	477	3.36%	7,984	56.30%	14,181
Chowan	4,014	55.53%	2,992	41.39%	222	3.08%	1,022	14.14%	7,228
Clay	4,437	73.83%	1,367	22.75%	206	3.42%	3,070	51.08%	6,010
Cleveland	28,479	63.75%	14,964	33.50%	1,230	2.75%	13,515	30.25%	44,673
Columbus	14,272	60.14%	9,063	38.19%	397	1.67%	5,209	21.95%	23,732
Craven	27,731	59.00%	17,630	37.51%	1,640	3.49%	10,101	21.49%	47,001
Cumberland	51,265	40.21%	71,605	56.16%	4,636	3.63%	-20,340	-15.95%	127,506
Currituck	9,163	72.33%	2,913	22.99%	593	4.68%	6,250	49.34%	12,669
Dare	11,460	58.44%	7,222	36.83%	927	4.73%	4,238	21.61%	19,609
Davidson	54,317	72.56%	18,109	24.19%	2,430	3.25%	36,208	48.37%	74,856
Davie	15,602	71.71%	5,270	24.22%	884	4.07%	10,332	47.49%	21,756
Duplin	12,217	58.58%	8,283	39.72%	356	1.70%	3,934	18.86%	20,856
Durham	28,350	18.16%	121,250	77.66%	6,534	4.18%	-92,900	-59.50%	156,134
Edgecombe	8,261	33.20%	16,224	65.19%	401	1.61%	-7,963	-31.99%	24,886
Forsyth	75,975	42.61%	94,464	52.98%	7,873	4.41%	-18,489	-10.37%	178,312
Franklin	16,368	53.90%	12,874	42.39%	1,126	3.71%	3,494	11.51%	30,368
Gaston	61,798	64.09%	31,177	32.33%	3,456	3.58%	30,621	31.76%	96,431
Gates	2,874	53.30%	2,385	44.23%	133	2.47%	489	9.07%	5,392
Graham	3,283	78.77%	768	18.43%	117	2.80%	2,515	60.34%	4,168
Granville	13,591	49.69%	12,909	47.19%	853	3.12%	682	2.50%	27,353
Greene	4,374	54.03%	3,605	44.53%	116	1.44%	769	9.50%	8,095
Guilford	98,062	38.10%	149,248	57.98%	10,095	3.92%	-51,186	-19.88%	257,405
Halifax	9,031	35.88%	15,748	62.57%	388	1.55%	-6,717	-26.69%	25,167
Harnett	27,614	59.95%	16,737	36.33%	1,714	3.72%	10,877	23.62%	46,065
Haywood	18,929	61.60%	10,473	34.08%	1,325	4.32%	8,456	27.52%	30,727
Henderson	35,809	61.55%	19,827	34.08%	2,540	4.37%	15,982	27.47%	58,176
Hertford	3,099	30.42%	6,910	67.84%	177	1.74%	-3,811	-37.42%	10,186
Hoke	7,760	42.57%	9,726	53.35%	744	4.08%	-1,966	-10.78%	18,230
Hyde	1,288	55.90%	965	41.88%	51	2.22%	323	14.02%	2,304
Iredell	54,754	66.31%	24,734	29.96%	3,079	3.73%	30,020	36.35%	82,567
Jackson	9,870	52.74%	7,713	41.22%	1,130	6.04%	2,157	11.52%	18,713
Johnston	54,372	63.29%	28,362	33.01%	3,175	3.70%	26,010	30.28%	85,909
Jones	2,974	57.92%	2,065	40.21%	96	1.87%	909	17.71%	5,135
Lee	13,712	54.66%	10,469	41.74%	903	3.60%	3,243	12.92%	25,084
Lenoir	13,613	50.78%	12,634	47.13%	560	2.09%	979	3.65%	26,807
Lincoln	28,806	71.97%	9,897	24.73%	1,320	3.30%	18,909	47.24%	40,023
Macon	12,127	68.38%	4,876	27.50%	731	4.12%	7,251	40.88%	17,734
Madison	6,783	60.19%	3,926	34.84%	560	4.97%	2,857	25.35%	11,269
Martin	5,897	49.29%	5,846	48.86%	221	1.85%	51	0.43%	11,964
McDowell	14,568	73.30%	4,667	23.48%	640	3.22%	9,901	49.82%	19,875
Mecklenburg	155,518	32.89%	294,562	62.29%	22,777	4.82%	-139,044	-29.40%	472,857
Mitchell	6,282	77.59%	1,596	19.71%	218	2.70%	4,686	57.88%	8,096
Montgomery	7,130	61.79%	4,150	35.96%	260	2.25%	2,980	25.83%	11,540
Moore	30,490	62.62%	16,329	33.54%	1,873	3.84%	14,161	29.08%	48,692
Nash	23,319	48.92%	23,235	48.75%	1,111	2.33%	84	0.17%	47,665
New Hanover	55,344	49.46%	50,979	45.56%	5,582	4.98%	4,365	3.90%	111,905
Northampton	3,582	36.37%	6,144	62.39%	122	1.24%	-2,562	-26.02%	9,848
Onslow	37,122	64.97%	17,514	30.65%	2,499	4.38%	19,608	34.32%	57,135
Orange	18,557	22.54%	59,923	72.78%	3,860	4.68%	-41,366	-50.24%	82,340
Pamlico	4,258	61.98%	2,448	35.63%	164	2.39%	1,810	26.35%	6,870
Pasquotank	8,180	47.04%	8,615	49.54%	596	3.42%	-435	-2.50%	17,391
Pender	17,639	63.26%	9,354	33.54%	892	3.20%	8,285	29.72%	27,885
Perquimans	4,177	62.27%	2,319	34.57%	212	3.16%	1,858	27.70%	6,708
Person	11,185	57.02%	7,833	39.93%	597	3.05%	3,352	17.09%	19,615
Pitt	35,691	44.32%	41,824	51.94%	3,012	3.74%	-6,133	-7.62%	80,527
Polk	6,768	61.90%	3,735	34.16%	431	3.94%	3,033	27.74%	10,934
Randolph	49,430	76.55%	13,194	20.43%	1,951	3.02%	36,236	56.12%	64,575
Richmond	10,383	53.72%	8,501	43.98%	444	2.30%	1,882	9.74%	19,328
Robeson	20,762	50.82%	19,016	46.54%	1,080	2.64%	1,746	4.28%	40,858
Rockingham	26,830	63.46%	14,228	33.65%	1,220	2.89%	12,602	29.81%	42,278
Rowan	42,810	66.51%	19,400	30.14%	2,159	3.35%	23,410	36.37%	64,369
Rutherford	21,871	72.16%	7,512	24.79%	924	3.05%	14,359	47.37%	30,307
Sampson	14,838	57.23%	10,547	40.68%	543	2.09%	4,291	16.55%	25,928
Scotland	6,256	44.92%	7,319	52.55%	353	2.53%	-1,063	-7.63%	13,928
Stanly	21,964	73.42%	7,094	23.71%	859	2.87%	14,870	49.71%	29,917
Stokes	17,116	75.90%	4,665	20.69%	769	3.41%	12,451	55.21%	22,550
Surry	23,671	73.52%	7,488	23.26%	1,037	3.22%	16,183	50.26%	32,196
Swain	3,565	58.21%	2,196	35.86%	363	5.93%	1,369	22.35%	6,124
Transylvania	10,520	58.87%	6,558	36.70%	791	4.43%	3,962	22.17%	17,869
Tyrrell	975	56.07%	720	41.40%	44	2.53%	255	14.67%	1,739
Union	66,707	63.10%	34,337	32.48%	4,666	4.42%	32,370	30.62%	105,710
Vance	7,332	36.70%	12,229	61.22%	416	2.08%	-4,897	-24.52%	19,977
Wake	196,082	37.16%	302,736	57.38%	28,806	5.46%	-106,654	-20.22%	527,624
Warren	3,214	32.66%	6,413	65.16%	215	2.18%	-3,199	-32.50%	9,842
Washington	2,564	41.59%	3,510	56.93%	91	1.48%	-946	-15.34%	6,165
Watauga	13,697	45.68%	14,138	47.15%	2,150	7.17%	-441	-1.47%	29,985
Wayne	27,540	54.33%	21,770	42.95%	1,379	2.72%	5,770	11.38%	50,689
Wilkes	23,752	75.89%	6,638	21.21%	906	2.90%	17,114	54.68%	31,296
Wilson	17,531	45.97%	19,663	51.56%	941	2.47%	-2,132	-5.59%	38,135
Yadkin	13,880	78.76%	3,160	17.93%	584	3.31%	10,720	60.83%	17,624
Yancey	6,385	64.11%	3,196	32.09%	379	3.80%	3,189	32.02%	9,960
Totals	2,362,631	49.83%	2,189,316	46.17%	189,617	4.00%	173,315	3.66%	4,741,564

Counties that flipped from Democratic to Republican

- Bladen (largest town: Elizabethtown)
- Gates (largest town: Gatesville)
- Granville (largest city: Oxford)
- Martin (largest town: Williamston)
- Nash (largest city: Rocky Mount)
- Richmond (largest city: Rockingham)
- Robeson (largest city: Lumberton)

Counties that flipped from Republican to Democratic

- Watauga (largest town: Boone)

==== By congressional district ====
Trump won ten of North Carolina's 13 congressional districts.

District	Trump	Clinton	Representative
1st	30%	68%	G. K. Butterfield
2nd	53%	44%	Renee Ellmers
2nd	53%	44%	George Holding
3rd	61%	37%	Walter B. Jones
4th	28%	68%	David Price
5th	57%	40%	Virginia Foxx
6th	56%	41%	Mark Walker
7th	58%	40%	David Rouzer
8th	56%	41%	Richard Hudson
9th	54%	43%	Robert Pittenger
10th	61%	36%	Patrick McHenry
11th	63%	34%	Mark Meadows
12th	28%	68%	Alma Adams
13th	53%	44%	Ted Budd

== Analysis ==
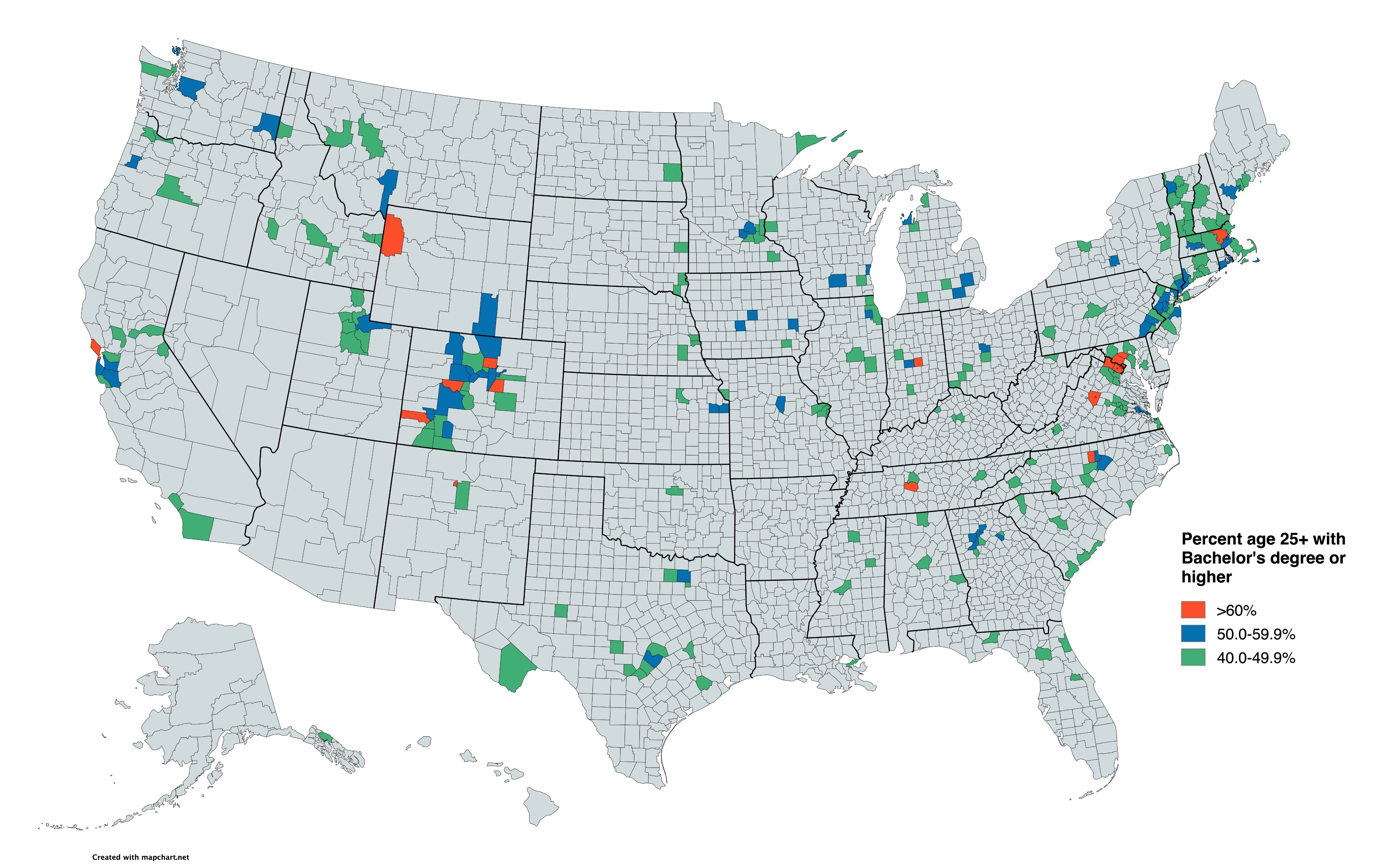
A map of the most college-educated counties in the United States

North Carolina shifted slightly rightward from 2012 in this election, with Clinton's gains with white college-educated voters largely but not entirely cancelling out Trump's gains among white voters without college degrees. By contrast, the fellow Southern states of Georgia and Virginia outright shifted leftward. Trump's gains outside of the Research Triangle and Mecklenburg County, particularly in Western North Carolina, were enough to win the state. Despite North Carolina remaining in the Republican presidential column in 2016, Republican governor Pat McCory concurrently lost re-election to Democratic challenger Roy Cooper.

Prior to the 2016 election, North Carolina had been a Republican stronghold since 1968 with the state voting Democratic only once between then and 2008. In 2008, North Carolina voted Democratic for only the second time in 40 years. Although the state returned to the Republican column in 2012, when the party's nominee, Mitt Romney, carried the state, it did so only narrowly, cementing its new status as a battleground state. Throughout the 2016 campaign, North Carolina was considered by most a tossup state, with the outcome going into election night heavily debated. The Trump campaign saw winning North Carolina as crucial in order for Trump to win the Electoral College; conversely, the Clinton campaign felt that it was vital for them to win the state to block Trump's path to an Electoral College win. Both Trump and Clinton campaigned in the state shortly before the general election.

Despite winning the state, Trump, in some ways, under-performed in comparison to Romney in 2012. Romney won a majority of the vote in 2012 with 50.4% while Trump only managed a plurality of 49.8%. Similarly, Clinton also under-performed in comparison to Obama, with Clinton winning only 46.2% in comparison to Obama's 48.35%. This situation was the result of the spike in votes for third party candidates in the state as 4% of North Carolinians voted for a candidate other than the Democratic and Republican nominees in 2016 as opposed to just 1.26% in 2012.

An increase in turnout in North Carolina allowed both Trump and Clinton to out-perform Romney and Obama in terms of the total votes each candidate received. In 2016 Trump won around 92,000 more votes than Romney did in 2012 while Clinton won around 10,000 more than Obama. Furthermore, Trump also outperformed Romney by winning North Carolina by a greater margin than Romney was able to as Trump won the state over Clinton by 3.7% compared to the 2% margin Romney won over Obama.

Trump never lost the state in any of his three runs (winning it by 1.34% in 2020), highlighting the state's slightly red lean in presidential elections. Obama won the state by just 0.32% in 2008, even as he won nationwide by 7.2%.

As of 2024, this is the last time the Democratic candidate won Scotland County, part of a trio of formerly solidly Democratic rural counties in southern North Carolina (adjacent Robeson and Richmond counties would flip in this election). It is also the most recent election where New Hanover County voted Republican.

== See also ==
- 2016 Democratic Party presidential debates and forums
- 2016 Democratic Party presidential primaries
- 2016 Republican Party presidential debates and forums
- 2016 Republican Party presidential primaries
- 2016 Libertarian Party presidential primaries
- 2016 United States Senate election in North Carolina
- 2016 North Carolina gubernatorial election
- 2016 North Carolina elections
