= Wiley Nickel =

American politician (born 1975)

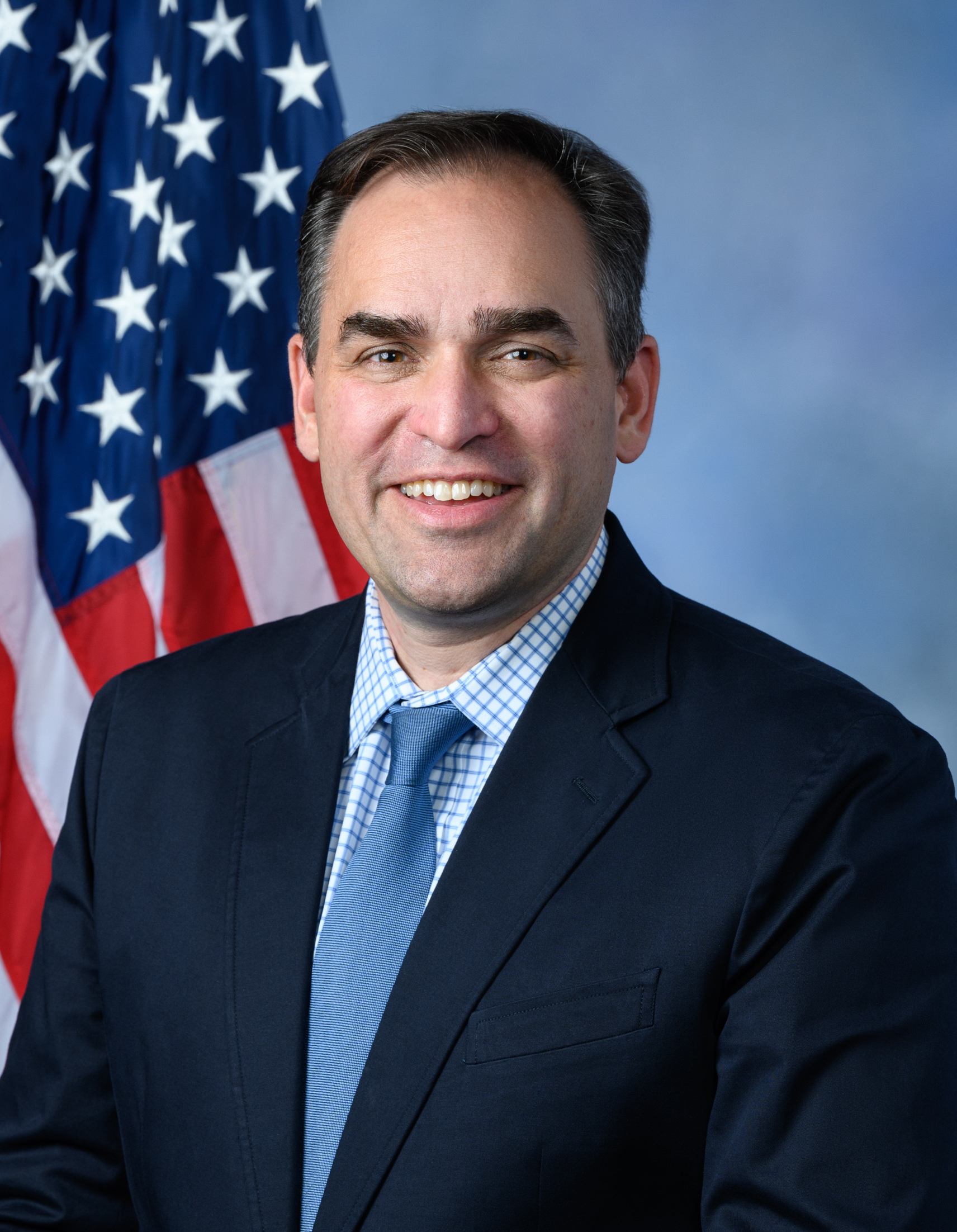
- Official portrait, 2023

District Attorney-elect of Wake County
- Assuming office January 1, 2027
- Succeeding: Lorrin Freeman

Member of the U.S. House of Representatives from North Carolina's 13th district
- In office January 3, 2023 – January 3, 2025
- Preceded by: Ted Budd
- Succeeded by: Brad Knott

Member of the North Carolina Senate from the 16th district
- In office January 1, 2019 – January 1, 2023
- Preceded by: Jay Chaudhuri
- Succeeded by: Gale Adcock

Personal details
- Born: George Wilmarth Nickel III; November 23, 1975 (age 50) Fresno, California, U.S.
- Party: Democratic
- Spouse: Caroline Nickel (m. 2007)
- Children: 2
- Education: Tulane University (BA); Pepperdine University (JD)

George Wilmarth Nickel III (born November 23, 1975) is an American attorney and politician who is the District Attorney-elect of Wake County, North Carolina. He served as the U.S. representative for North Carolina's 13th congressional district from 2023 to 2025. He is a member of the Democratic Party.

Nickel served as a member of the North Carolina Senate from the 16th district from 2019 to 2023. He was elected to the US House of Representatives in 2022. On December 16, 2023, Nickel decided not to seek re-election after his seat was redrawn to heavily favor the Republican Party.

On April 9, 2025, Nickel launched his campaign for the United States Senate in the 2026 election, but withdrew on July 29 after former Governor Roy Cooper declared his candidacy. Nickel proceeded to endorse Cooper, and, on September 16, announced his candidacy for District Attorney of Wake County. On March 3, 2026, he won the Democratic primary in a three-candidate race and was elected unopposed in the November 2026 general election. He is expected to take office on January 1, 2027.

== Early life and education ==
George Wilmarth Nickel III was born in Fresno, California, on November 23, 1975. He is the great-great-great-grandson of Henry Miller, who was one of the largest landowners in the 19th century and established a farming empire in the Central Valley of California. After graduating from Francis W. Parker School in Chicago, he earned a Bachelor of Arts degree in political science and government from Tulane University and a Juris Doctor from Pepperdine University School of Law.

== Career ==
=== Politics ===
Nickel worked for Vice President Al Gore from 1996 to 2001 as a member of his national advance staff. He is also a member of Gore's Climate Reality Leadership Corps.

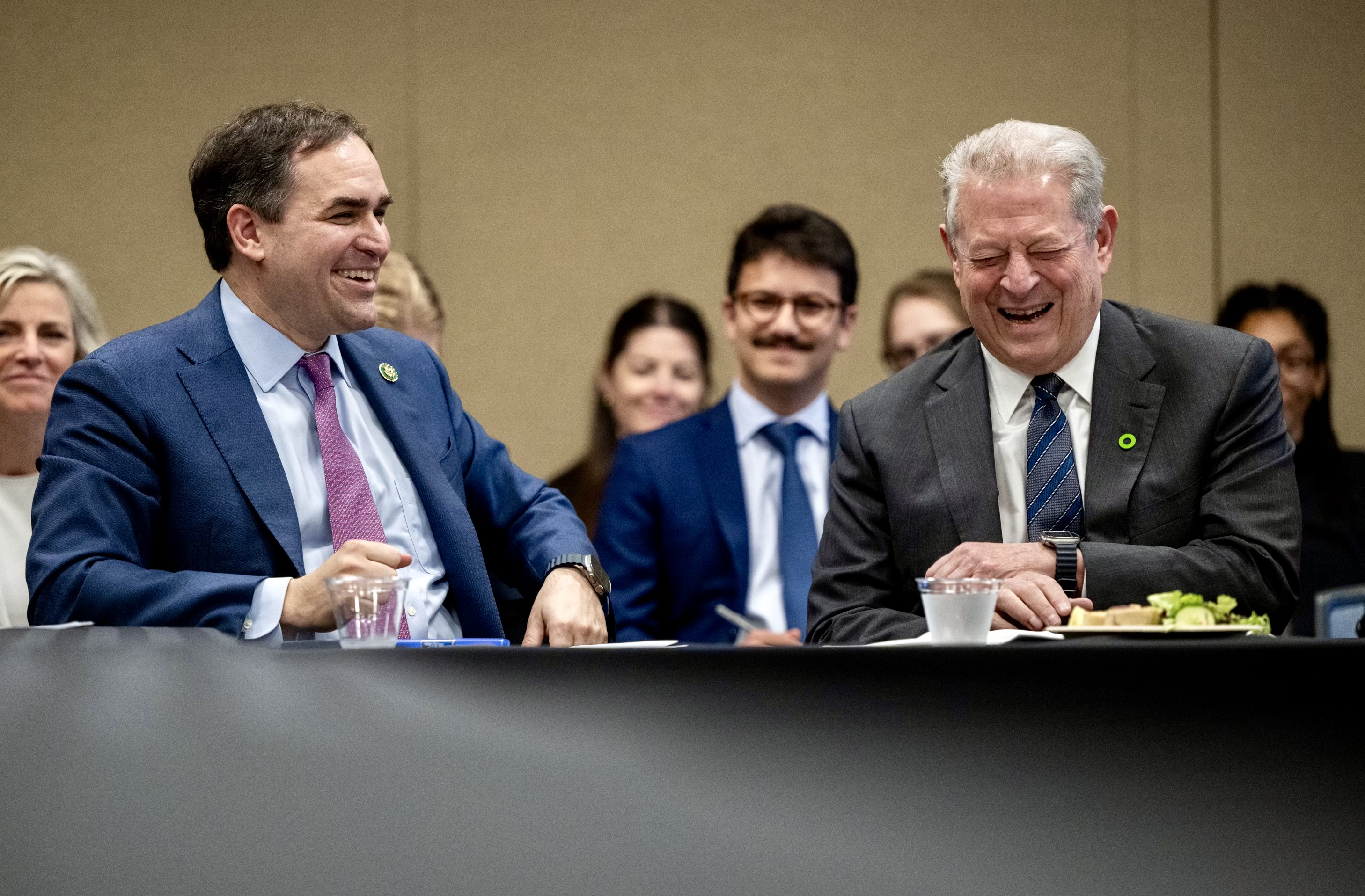
Wiley Nickel and Al Gore at Congressional Luncheon

Nickel later worked on Barack Obama's 2008 presidential campaign and served on the White House national advance staff from 2008 until 2012. He is a member of the Obama Alumni Association and was part of Obama's first wave of political endorsements in 2018. Obama endorsed six candidates in North Carolina, including Nickel, in August 2018.

==== 2006 State Senate election ====
Nickel ran in California's 12th State Senate district in 2006 against incumbent Republican Jeff Denham. He was called "a moderate Democrat" and the race was seen as potentially competitive. During the primary election, he spent $250,000 on advertisements, mainly funded by personal loans. The ads, which mainly ran in the Sacramento media market, did not mention what district he was running in or his party affiliation. He lost the general election to Denham, receiving 40.2% of the vote to Denham's 59.8%.

=== Law ===
Nickel was a criminal defense attorney, having opened his law practice in Cary in 2011.

== North Carolina Senate ==
=== Elections ===
==== 2018 ====
Nickel was first elected to represent the 16th senate district with over 65% of the vote on November 6, 2018. He held a seat that had been opened when incumbent Jay Chaudhuri was redistricted into the neighboring 15th district. His victory helped to break the Republican supermajority in the North Carolina General Assembly, flipping one of six Republican Senate seats from red to blue.

==== 2020 ====
Nickel ran for reelection in 2020. He was unopposed in the Democratic primary and defeated Republican nominee Will Marsh with 65.6% of the vote. He was endorsed by The News & Observer.

=== Tenure ===
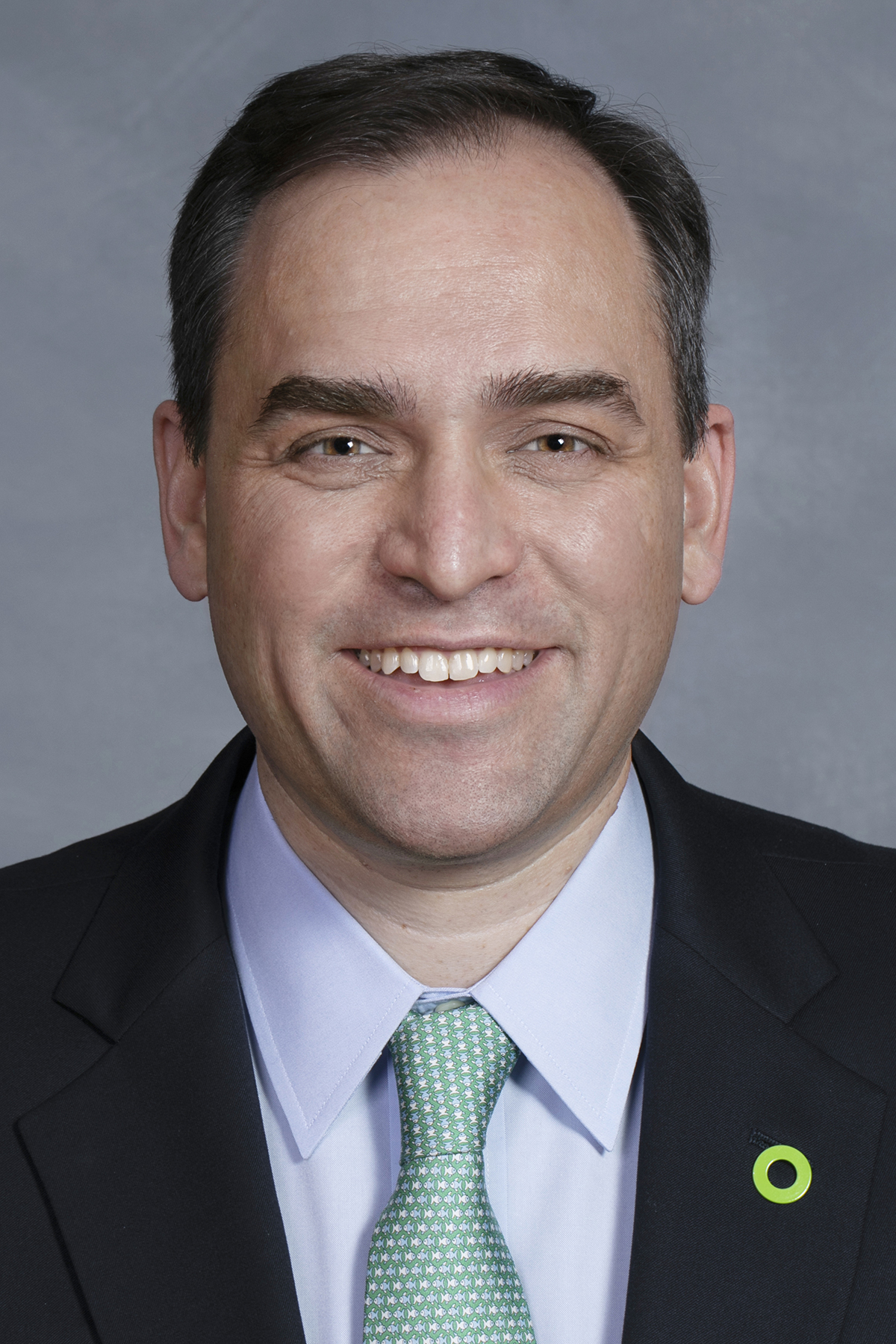
Nickel's official North Carolina Senate portrait

==== 2019–20 session ====
Nickel was appointed to the Agriculture/Environment/Natural Resources Committee, the Pensions/Retirement/Aging Committee and the Education/Higher Education Appropriations Committee on January 18, 2019. He co-sponsored a bill to restore master's degree and doctoral degree pay for teachers in North Carolina.

Nickel co-sponsored Senate Bill 209, which would increase the scope and punishment of hate crimes and require the SBI to maintain and create a hate crimes statistics database. He spoke about SB 209 during a candlelight vigil at the Islamic Center of Cary to remember the New Zealand terror attack victims.

During his tenure in the North Carolina State Senate, Wiley Nickel was a strong supporter of organized labor and introduced legislation to repeal the state's longstanding prohibition on public-sector collective bargaining, a restriction widely viewed as a legacy of the Jim Crow era.

==== 2021–22 session ====
Nickel served on the Redistricting and Elections Committee, the Judiciary Committee, the Pensions/Retirement/Aging Committee, and the Appropriations on General Government/Information Technology Committee in the state senate.

Nickel pushed for reforms to North Carolina’s unemployment insurance system, describing it as among the weakest in the nation and co-sponsoring legislation to increase weekly benefits and extend their duration for unemployed workers.

During the 2021–2022 legislative session, Nickel emphasized bipartisan cooperation, highlighting work on issues such as Medicaid expansion, broadband access, and economic policy, and urged bipartisanship in a farewell press conference at the conclusion of his term.

== U.S. House of Representatives ==
=== Elections ===
==== 2022 ====
Nickel ran for Congress in North Carolina's newly drawn 13th congressional district. The district covers southern Wake County, all of Johnston County, and parts of Wayne and Harnett Counties. Nickel won the Democratic nomination.

The conservative Carolina Journal wrote that Nickel ran "as a moderate despite a fairly left-wing voting record".

Nickel was endorsed by the Network for Public Education Fund, the North Carolina Association of Educators, NARAL Pro-Choice America, Communication Workers of America, the North Carolina State AFL-CIO, the National Association of Social Workers, Human Rights Campaign, Everytown for Gun Safety, the League of Conservation Voters, the Voter Protection Project, the Sierra Club, Equality North Carolina, the North Carolina Alliance for Retired Americans, North Carolina Asian Americans Together in Action, and Professional Fire Fighters and Paramedics of North Carolina.

Nickel defeated Bo Hines, the Republican nominee, in the November 8 general election. The race was closely contested and drew significant attention as one of the most competitive congressional districts in the country. Nickel won with just over 51 percent of the vote, prevailing in a district that included both suburban Triangle-area communities and more rural regions of central North Carolina. His victory resulted in a partisan shift in the district, with Democrats gaining the seat as one of only six seats nationwide to flip from red to blue.

==== 2023 ====
Nickel was sworn in as the U.S. representative for North Carolina's 13th congressional district in January, 2023.

Nickel served on the House Financial Services Committee. The committee is among the most influential standing committees in the U.S. House of Representatives, with jurisdiction over banking, housing, insurance, and financial markets. Assignment to this exclusive committee is typically limited due to its broad jurisdiction over major economic and housing policy areas. Nickel was one of only two freshman Democrats appointed to one of the Big Four House Committees (Appropriations, Ways & Means, Energy & Commerce and Financial Services).

During his tenure in Congress, Nickel co-sponsored legislation to ban members of Congress from trading individual stocks. He sold all of his individual stocks prior to being sworn-in and joined other lawmakers in supporting the proposal, which aimed to address potential conflicts of interest and increase public trust in government by restricting lawmakers’ ability to buy and sell individual securities while in office. The effort was part of a broader bipartisan push in Congress to limit or prohibit stock trading by elected officials.

==== 2024 ====
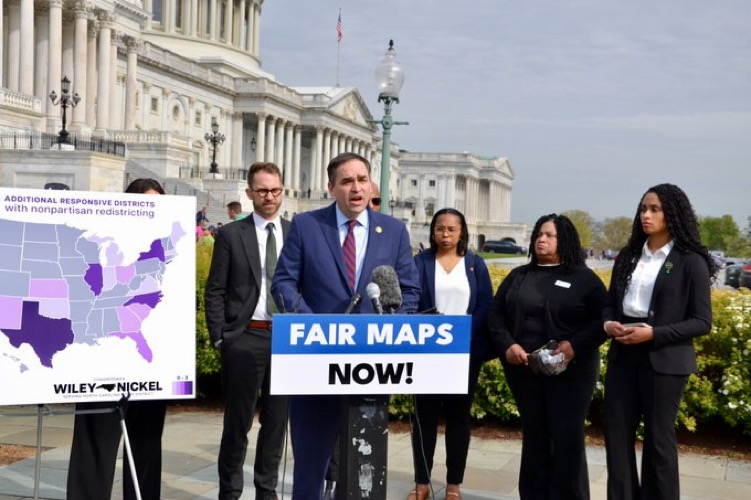
Wiley Nickel Introduces Fair Maps Act at US House

In April 2024, Nickel introduced the Fair and Impartial Redistricting for Meaningful and Accountable Political Systems (FAIR MAPS) Act, legislation designed to combat partisan gerrymandering by establishing independent, nonpartisan redistricting commissions nationwide. The proposal was introduced in response to ongoing disputes over congressional maps, including in North Carolina.

In 2024, Nickel traveled to Ukraine as part of a bipartisan congressional delegation, where he met with President Volodymyr Zelenskyy and received briefings from Ukrainian officials and military personnel during the ongoing Russian invasion. Following the visit, Nickel called for continued U.S. assistance to Ukraine and urged Congress to pass additional aid, stating that delays would weaken Ukraine’s position in the conflict with Russia.

Nickel retired after one term leaving office in January 2025, with plans of running in 2026 for US Senate.

=== Committee assignments ===
- House Committee on Financial Services

=== Caucus memberships ===
- Blue Dog Coalition
- Congressional Equality Caucus
- Congressional Ukraine Caucus
- New Democrat Coalition
- Problem Solvers Caucus

== 2026 U.S. Senate candidacy ==
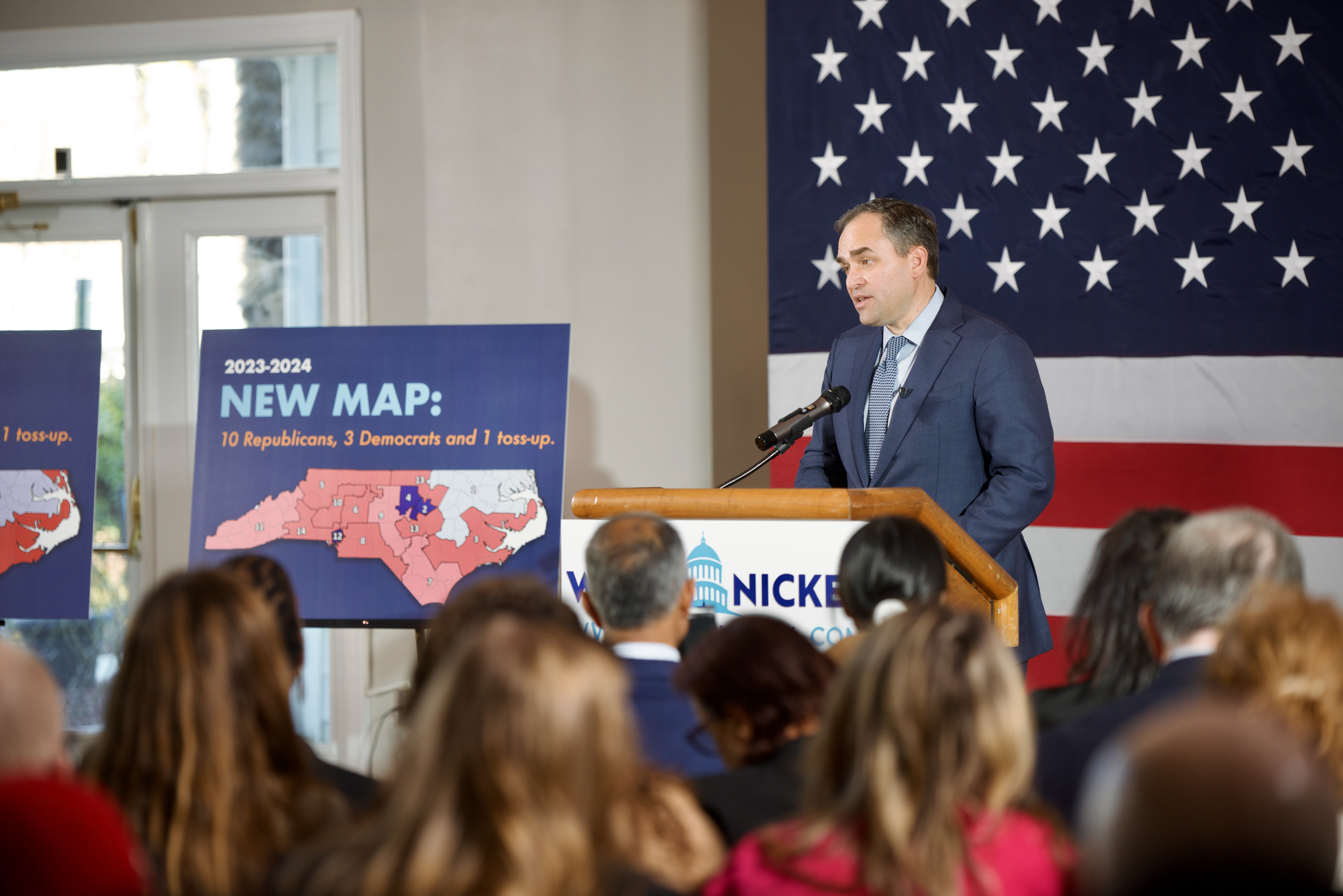
Wiley Nickel in Cary for start of US Senate campaign

On April 9, 2025, Nickel announced his candidacy for the United States Senate. On June 29, 2025, incumbent Republican Thom Tillis withdrew from the election, with race forecasters rating the seat as one of the battleground states for control of the Senate in 2026. On July 28, 2025, former Governor Roy Cooper entered the race. The next day, Nickel suspended his campaign and endorsed Cooper, arguing that he was the best candidate to win the seat for Democrats.

== 2026 Wake County District Attorney election ==
On September 16, 2025, Nickel announced a campaign for Wake County, North Carolina District Attorney. On March 3, 2026, Nickel won the Democratic primary, defeating assistant district attorney Melanie Shekita and former prosecutor Sherita Walton. Nickel ran unopposed in the general election and was elected District Attorney.

Nickel's campaign focused on expanding resources for the Wake County District Attorney’s Office, citing staffing shortages relative to population growth.

Nickel was endorsed by the Raleigh News & Observer, which wrote that Wake County needed "not only a new head prosecutor, but a fresh view of how to support and employ the powers of the office."

Wake County District Attorney Wiley Nickel in Courtroom

== Political positions ==
Nickel supports abortion rights and codifying Roe v. Wade into federal law.

During his tenure in Congress, Nickel received a 94% score from the Human Rights Campaign Congressional Scorecard, which evaluates lawmakers based on their support for LGBTQ-related legislation and policy positions. He also co-sponsored the Equality Act in the 118th Congress, legislation that would expand federal civil rights protections to prohibit discrimination based on sexual orientation and gender identity.

During his congressional tenure, Nickel was rated as a strong supporter of reproductive freedom by Reproductive Freedom for All (formerly NARAL Pro-Choice America), which recorded his votes as consistently opposing legislative efforts to restrict abortion access, including measures targeting medication abortion and federal reproductive health programs. He voted against multiple Republican-led amendments and resolutions that the organization characterized as attempts to limit abortion access and reproductive health care protections.

== Electoral history ==
=== 2006 ===
2006 California State Senate election
Party	Candidate	Votes	%
Republican	Jeff Denham (incumbent)	92,879	59.8
Democratic	Wiley Nickel	62,539	40.2
Total votes		155,418	100.0
Republican hold			

=== 2018 ===
2018 North Carolina Senate, District 16 Democratic primary
Party	Candidate	Votes	%
Democratic	Wiley Nickel	8,585	55.48%
Democratic	Luis Toledo	6,890	44.52%
Total votes		15,445	100.00%

2018 North Carolina Senate, District 16 general election
Party	Candidate	Votes	%
Democratic	Wiley Nickel	63,335	65.28%
Republican	Paul Smith	30,308	31.24%
Libertarian	Brian Irving	3,382	3.49%
Total votes		97,025	100.00%
Democratic gain from Republican			

=== 2020 ===
2020 North Carolina Senate, District 16 general election
Party	Candidate	Votes	%
Democratic	Wiley Nickel	80,530	65.65%
Republican	Paul Smith	42,144	34.35%
Total votes		122,674	100.00%
Democratic hold			

=== 2022 ===
2022 Democratic primary in North Carolina's 13th congressional district
Party	Candidate	Votes	%
Democratic	Wiley Nickel	22,974	51.68%
Democratic	Sam Searcy	10,210	22.97%
Democratic	Jamie Campbell Bowles	4,175	9.39%
Democratic	Nathan Click	3,813	8.58%
Democratic	Denton Lee	3,285	7.39%
Total votes		44,457	100.00%

2022 North Carolina's 13th congressional district election
Party	Candidate	Votes	%
Democratic	Wiley Nickel	143,090	51.06%
Republican	Bo Hines	134,256	48.04%
Write-in			
Total votes			100.00%
Democratic gain from Republican			

=== 2026 ===
2026 Wake County District Attorney Democratic primary
Party	Candidate	Votes	%
Democratic	Wiley Nickel	64,402	48.96
Democratic	Sherita Walton	39,950	30.51
Democratic	Melanie Shekita	26,941	20.53
Total votes		131,293	100.0

2026 Wake County District Attorney general election
Party	Candidate	Votes	%
Democratic	Wiley Nickel	389,771	100.00
Total votes		389,771	100.00
Democratic hold			

== Personal life ==
Born in California, Nickel moved to North Carolina in 2009. He lives in Cary with his wife, Caroline, and their two children. Nickel is a second cousin of conservative commentator Tucker Carlson.

U.S. House of Representatives
Preceded by Ted Budd	Member of the U.S. House of Representatives from North Carolina's 13th congressional district 2023–2025	Succeeded by Brad Knott
U.S. order of precedence (ceremonial)
Preceded by Jeff Jackson as Former U.S. Representative	Order of precedence of the United States as Former U.S. Representative	Succeeded by Peter Plympton Smith as Former U.S. Representative
