= North Carolina's 16th Senate district =

American legislative district

North Carolina's 16th State Senate district
Senator
Gale Adcock; D–Cary
- Demographics: 53% White; 10% Black; 8% Hispanic; 25% Asian; 1% Other; 4% Multiracial
- Population (2023): 204,170

North Carolina's 16th Senate district is one of 50 districts in the North Carolina Senate. It has been represented by Democrat Gale Adcock since 2023.

== Geography ==
Since 2003, the district has included part of Wake County. The district overlaps with the 11th, 40th, 41st, and 49th state house districts.

== District officeholders since 1973 ==
=== Multi-member district ===
Senator	Party	Dates	Notes	Senator	Party	Dates	Notes	Counties
William Saunders (Southern Pines)	Democratic	January 1, 1973 – January 1, 1975	Redistricted from the 19th district.	A. B. Coleman Jr. (Hillsborough)	Democratic	January 1, 1973 – January 1, 1975		1973–1983; All of Randolph, Moore, Chatham, and Orange counties.
Russell Walker (Asheboro)	Democratic	January 1, 1975 – January 1, 1995	Retired.	Charles Vickery (Chapel Hill)	Democratic	January 1, 1975 – January 1, 1983		1973–1983; All of Randolph, Moore, Chatham, and Orange counties.
Russell Walker (Asheboro)	Democratic	January 1, 1975 – January 1, 1995	Retired.	Wanda Hunt (Pinehurst)	Democratic	January 1, 1983 – January 1, 1991		1983–1993; All of Randolph, Moore, and Chatham counties. Part of Orange County.
Russell Walker (Asheboro)	Democratic	January 1, 1975 – January 1, 1995	Retired.	Howard Lee (Chapel Hill)	Democratic	January 1, 1991 – January 1, 1995	Lost re-election.	1983–1993; All of Randolph, Moore, and Chatham counties. Part of Orange County.
Russell Walker (Asheboro)	Democratic	January 1, 1975 – January 1, 1995	Retired.	Howard Lee (Chapel Hill)	Democratic	January 1, 1991 – January 1, 1995	Lost re-election.	1993–2003; All of Moore, Chatham, and Orange counties. Parts of Randolph and Lee counties.
Teena Smith Little (Southern Pines)	Republican	January 1, 1995 – January 1, 1997	Lost re-election.	Fred Hobbs (Southern Pines)	Democratic	January 1, 1995 – January 1, 1997	Retired.	1993–2003; All of Moore, Chatham, and Orange counties. Parts of Randolph and Lee counties.
Eleanor Kinnaird (Chapel Hill)	Democratic	January 1, 1997 – January 1, 2003	Redistricted to the 23rd district.	Howard Lee (Chapel Hill)	Democratic	January 1, 1997 – January 1, 2003	Redistricted to the 23rd district and lost re-nomination.	1993–2003; All of Moore, Chatham, and Orange counties. Parts of Randolph and Lee counties.

=== Single-member district ===
Senator	Party	Dates	Notes	Counties
Eric Miller Reeves (Raleigh)	Democratic	January 1, 2003 – January 1, 2005	Redistricted from the 14th district. Retired.	2003–Present; Part of Wake County.
Janet Cowell (Raleigh)	Democratic	January 1, 2005 – January 1, 2009	Retired to run for State Treasurer.	2003–Present; Part of Wake County.
Josh Stein (Raleigh)	Democratic	January 1, 2009 – March 21, 2016	Resigned to run for Attorney General.	2003–Present; Part of Wake County.
Vacant		March 21, 2016 – April 19, 2016		2003–Present; Part of Wake County.
Jay Chaudhuri (Raleigh)	Democratic	April 19, 2016 – January 1, 2019	Appointed to finish Stein's term. Redistricted to the 15th district.	2003–Present; Part of Wake County.
Wiley Nickel (Cary)	Democratic	January 1, 2019 – January 1, 2023	Retired to run for Congress.	2003–Present; Part of Wake County.
Gale Adcock (Cary)	Democratic	January 1, 2023 – Present		2003–Present; Part of Wake County.

== Election results ==
=== 2024 ===
North Carolina Senate 16th district general election, 2024
Party	Candidate	Votes	%
Democratic	Gale Adcock (incumbent)	84,424	100%
Total votes		84,424	100%
Democratic hold			

=== 2022 ===
North Carolina Senate 16th district general election, 2022
Party	Candidate	Votes	%
Democratic	Gale Adcock	49,204	65.18%
Republican	James Powers	23,161	30.68%
Libertarian	Dee Watson	1,771	2.35%
Green	Michael Trudeau	1,348	1.79%
Total votes		75,484	100%
Democratic hold			

=== 2020 ===
North Carolina Senate 16th district general election, 2020
Party	Candidate	Votes	%
Democratic	Wiley Nickel (incumbent)	80,530	65.65%
Republican	Will Marsh	42,144	34.35%
Total votes		122,674	100%
Democratic hold			

=== 2018 ===
North Carolina Senate 16th district Democratic primary election, 2018
Party	Candidate	Votes	%
Democratic	Wiley Nickel	8,585	55.48%
Democratic	Luis Toledo	6,890	44.52%
Total votes		15,475	100%

North Carolina Senate 16th district general election, 2018
Party	Candidate	Votes	%
Democratic	Wiley Nickel	63,335	65.28%
Republican	Paul Smith	30,308	31.24%
Libertarian	Brian Irving	3,382	3.49%
Total votes		97,025	100%
Democratic win (new seat)			

=== 2016 ===
North Carolina Senate 16th district Democratic primary election, 2016
Party	Candidate	Votes	%
Democratic	Jay Chaudhuri	20,232	62.93%
Democratic	Ellis Hankins	11,916	37.07%
Total votes		32,148	100%

North Carolina Senate 16th district general election, 2016
Party	Candidate	Votes	%
Democratic	Jay Chaudhuri (incumbent)	68,842	65.33%
Republican	Eric Weaver	36,530	34.67%
Total votes		105,372	100%
Democratic hold			

=== 2014 ===
North Carolina Senate 16th district general election, 2014
Party	Candidate	Votes	%
Democratic	Josh Stein (incumbent)	42,422	67.11%
Republican	Molotov Mitchell	20,791	32.89%
Total votes		63,213	100%
Democratic hold			

=== 2012 ===
North Carolina Senate 16th district general election, 2012
Party	Candidate	Votes	%
Democratic	Josh Stein (incumbent)	69,405	100%
Total votes		69,405	100%
Democratic hold			

=== 2010 ===
North Carolina Senate 16th district general election, 2010
Party	Candidate	Votes	%
Democratic	Josh Stein (incumbent)	32,248	54.89%
Republican	Michael Beezley	24,466	41.64%
Libertarian	Stephanie E. Watson	2,040	3.47%
Total votes		58,754	100%
Democratic hold			

=== 2008 ===
North Carolina Senate 16th district Democratic primary election, 2008
Party	Candidate	Votes	%
Democratic	Josh Stein	15,715	47.97%
Democratic	Jack Nichols	13,224	40.37%
Democratic	Mike Shea	3,822	11.67%
Total votes		32,761	100%

North Carolina Senate 16th district general election, 2008
Party	Candidate	Votes	%
Democratic	Josh Stein	58,357	60.82%
Republican	John Alexander	37,586	39.18%
Total votes		95,943	100%
Democratic hold			

=== 2006 ===
North Carolina Senate 16th district general election, 2006
Party	Candidate	Votes	%
Democratic	Janet Cowell (incumbent)	30,330	100%
Total votes		30,330	100%
Democratic hold			

=== 2004 ===
North Carolina Senate 16th district Democratic primary election, 2004
Party	Candidate	Votes	%
Democratic	Janet Cowell	5,367	49.03%
Democratic	Jack Nichols	2,641	24.13%
Democratic	Carter Worthy	2,136	19.51%
Democratic	Mike Shea	802	7.33%
Total votes		10,946	100%

North Carolina Senate 16th district general election, 2004
Party	Candidate	Votes	%
Democratic	Janet Cowell	45,396	59.44%
Republican	Mark A. Bradick	28,995	37.97%
Libertarian	Jason P. Mara	1,979	2.59%
Total votes		76,370	100%
Democratic hold			

=== 2002 ===
North Carolina Senate 16th district general election, 2002
Party	Candidate	Votes	%
Democratic	Eric Miller Reeves (incumbent)	25,799	49.29%
Republican	Paul Coble	25,323	48.38%
Libertarian	Jason Mara	1,215	2.32%
Total votes		52,337	100%
Democratic hold			

=== 2000 ===
North Carolina Senate 16th district general election, 2000
Party	Candidate	Votes	%
Democratic	Eleanor Kinnaird (incumbent)	68,346	27.09%
Democratic	Howard Lee (incumbent)	65,167	25.83%
Republican	William T. "Bill" Boyd	60,222	23.87%
Republican	Vickie Hargrove	58,561	23.21%
Total votes		252,296	100%
Democratic hold			
Democratic hold			
