= John H. Carrington =

American politician (1934–2017)

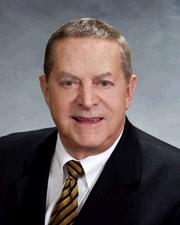

Member of the North Carolina Senate
- In office January 1, 1995 – January 1, 2005
- Preceded by: Linda Hinkleman Gunter
- Succeeded by: Neal Hunt
- Constituency: 36th District (1995-2003); 15th District (2003-2005)

Personal details
- Born: October 25, 1934 Philadelphia, Pennsylvania, U.S.
- Died: February 28, 2017 (aged 82)
- Party: Republican
- Education: Widener College
- Occupation: Businessman

John Hunter Carrington (October 25, 1934 – February 28, 2017) was an American politician. Republican former member of the North Carolina General Assembly who long represented the state's fifteenth Senate district, including constituents in Wake county. He headed a major company in the evidence-collection and security business.

In 2005, Carrington was charged with illegally exporting evidence-collection gear to China and took a plea bargain in December 2005 to felony charges in which he has been fined $850,000. One of his companies also took a plea agreement in the matter.

Party political offices
Preceded by Bill Cobey	Republican nominee for Lieutenant Governor of North Carolina; 1984	Succeeded by Jim Gardner
Preceded by Patric G. Dorsey	Republican nominee for North Carolina Secretary of State; 1988, 1992	Succeeded by Richard Petty
North Carolina Senate
Preceded by Linda Hinkleman Gunter	Member of the North Carolina Senate from the 36th district 1995–2003	Succeeded by Fletcher Hartsell
Preceded by Oscar Harris	Member of the North Carolina Senate from the 15th district 2003–2005	Succeeded by Neal Hunt
