= Oscar N. Harris =

American politician (1939–2020)

Oscar Harris

Mayor of Dunn, North Carolina
- In office 2003–2019
- In office 1987–1995

Member of the North Carolina Senate from the 15th district
- In office 1999–2003
- Preceded by: Daniel E. Page
- Succeeded by: John Carrington

Personal details
- Born: Oscar Nathan Harris; November 6, 1939 Newton Grove, North Carolina, U.S.
- Died: January 28, 2020 (aged 80) Dunn, North Carolina, U.S.
- Party: Democratic
- Children: 2
- Education: Campbell University (BS)

Military service
- Branch/service: United States Marine Corps
- Years of service: 1958–1966
- Unit: United States Marine Corps Reserve (1961–1966)

Oscar Nathan Harris (November 6, 1939 – January 28, 2020) was an American accountant, businessman, and politician who served as a member of the North Carolina Senate from 1998 to 2002.

== Early life and education ==
Born in Newton Grove, North Carolina, Harris graduated from Campbell University.

== Career ==
Harris served in the United States Marine Corps from 1958 to 1961 and in the United States Marine Corps Reserve from 1961 to 1966. Harris served as the mayor of Dunn, North Carolina, from 1987 to 1995 and again from 2003 to 2019. He was a member of the North Carolina Senate from 1998 to 2002. Harris was a Democrat. Harris was the campaign treasurer for Governor Bev Perdue. He also ran an accounting firm in Dunn before it merged with another company in 2017.

== Personal life ==
Harris was married and had two children. He died at home on January 28, 2020, at the age of 80.

The day after his death, the new student union at his alma mater Campbell University was named after him Oscar N. Harris Student Union.
