= Oscar N. Harris Student Union =

Student union of Campbell University

Coordinates: 35.40759°N 78.73904°W

- Interactive map of the Oscar N. Harris Student Union area

General information
- Status: Completed
- Location: 459 Leslie Campbell Avenue Buies Creek, NC 27506, Buies Creek, NC
- Groundbreaking: April 25, 2018
- Completed: April 25, 2020
- Opened: May 11, 2020

Dimensions
- Other dimensions: 110,000 sq ft (10,000 m^{2})

Technical details
- Floor count: 2

The Oscar N. Harris Student Union is a 110,000 sq ft (10,000 m^{2}) student union that is located on the campus of Campbell University, which is located in Buies Creek, NC, near Lillington, the county seat of Harnett County, NC. The building houses a single-screen movie theater, a workout room, a bookstore, and several restaurants, a snack bar (known as Oasis) and a deli. The student union is named after the mayor of Dunn, North Carolina, Oscar N. Harris.

== History ==
The development of the Student Union was proposed by Jerry M. Wallace, the fourth president of Campbell University, in 2014. After J. Bradley Creed became president, he started to develop a plan for a new student union, opening sometime around Fall 2019. The placement of the building was overlapped with two dorms that were later demolished in 2018 when Campbell moved the dorm to the newly-opened Luby Wood Hall.

=== Construction ===
After the demolition of the two student dorms, construction began on April 25, 2018, with the ground breaking of the new student union. On the same day, the new McLeod Admissions and Financial Aid Center opened to the public.

== Commemoration ==
The official name of the student union was given to Oscar N. Harris, the mayor of Dunn, North Carolina, on January 29, 2020, the day after his death.

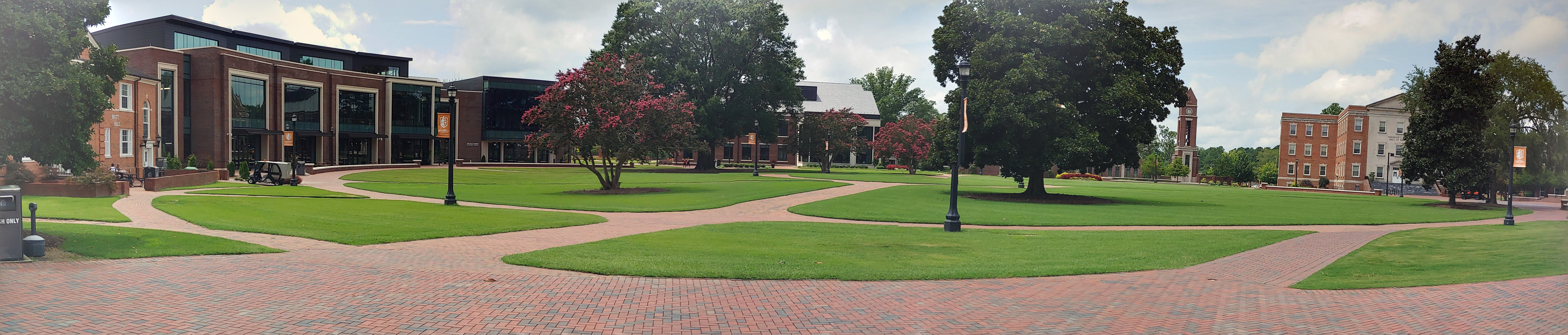
The Oscar N. Harris Student Union
