= 2026 Wake County District Attorney election =

Local election in North Carolina

2026 Wake County Democratic District Attorney primary
- March 3, 2026
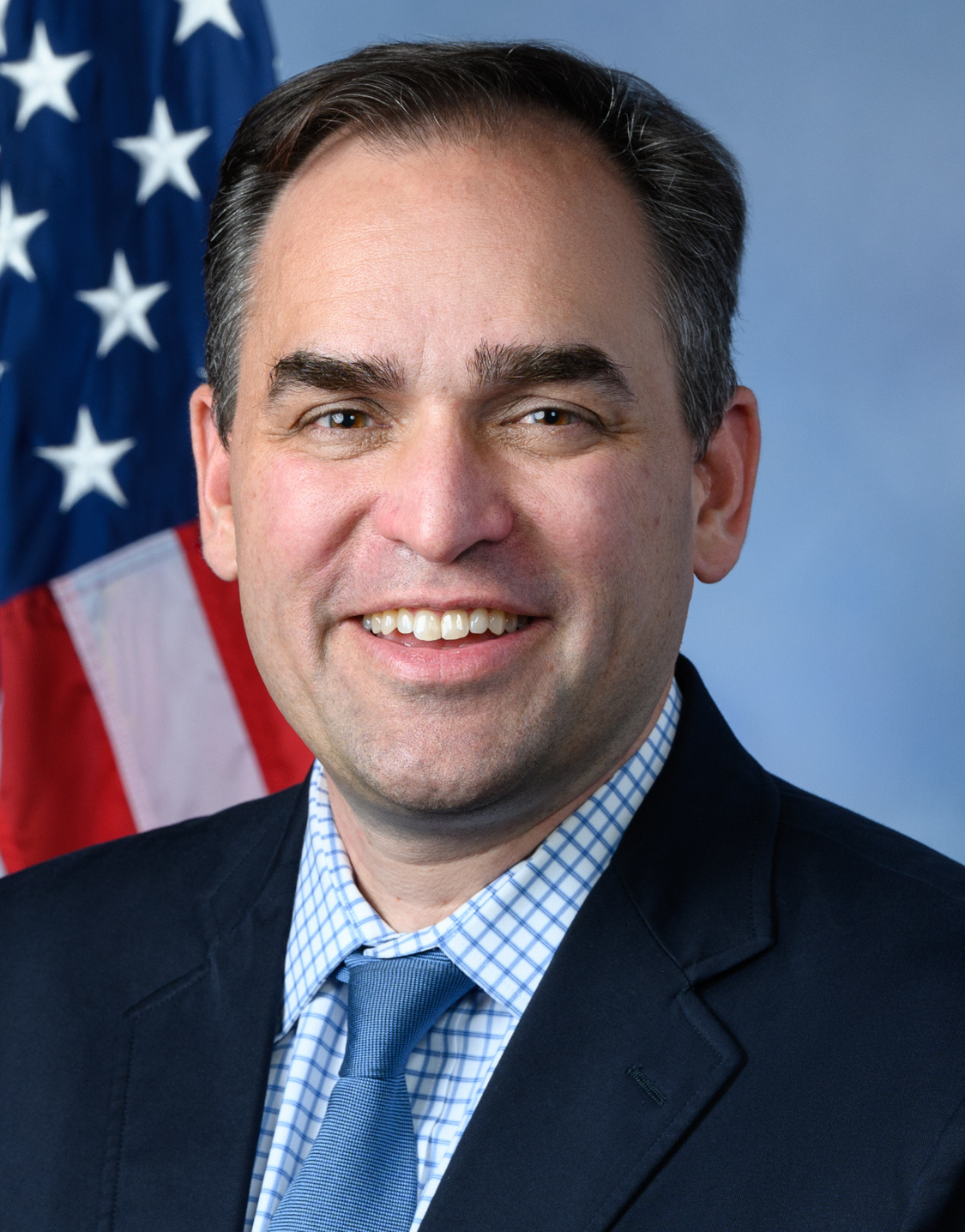

Candidate	Wiley Nickel	Sherita Walton	Melanie Shekita
Party	Democratic	Democratic	Democratic
Popular vote	64,402	40,123	27,004
Percentage	48.96%	30.51%	20.53%
- Partial precinct results (Note: These precinct results are incomplete, as the Wake County Board of Elections only allocates Election Day votes by precinct during the county canvass. Full precinct results will be released by the North Carolina State Board of Elections by April 2, 2026.); Nickel: 30–40% 40–50% 50–60% 60–70% Walton: 30–40% 40–50% 50–60% 60–70% Shekita: 40–50% 50–60% Tie: 30–40% (Note: Tie between Wiley Nickel and Sherita Walton)
District Attorney before election
Lorrin Freeman
Democratic
Elected District Attorney
Wiley Nickel
Democratic

The 2026 Wake County District Attorney election was held on November 3, 2026, to elect the district attorney of Wake County, North Carolina. Primary elections were held on March 3. Incumbent Democratic district attorney Lorrin Freeman did not run for re-election. Wiley Nickel won the Democratic primary election and faces no opposition in the general election.

== Democratic primary ==
=== Candidates ===
==== Nominee ====
- Wiley Nickel, U.S. representative from North Carolina's 13th district (2023–2025)

==== Eliminated in primary ====
- Melanie Shekita, assistant district attorney
- Sherita Walton, Raleigh city attorney

==== Declined ====
- Lorrin Freeman, incumbent district attorney

=== Endorsements ===
Wiley Nickel

Local officials

- Harold Weinbrecht, mayor of Cary (2007–present)
- Leonardo Williams, mayor of Durham (2023–present)

Newspapers

- The News & Observer
Sherita Walton

Local officials

- Lorrin Freeman, incumbent district attorney

Organizations

- Working Families Party

=== Results ===
Democratic primary
Party	Candidate	Votes	%
Democratic	Wiley Nickel	64,402	48.96
Democratic	Sherita Walton	40,123	30.51
Democratic	Melanie Shekita	27,004	20.53
Total votes		131,529	100.00

== General election ==
=== Results ===
2026 Wake County District Attorney general election
Party	Candidate	Votes	%
Democratic	Wiley Nickel	389,771	100.00
Total votes		389,771	100.00
Democratic hold			
