= Neal Hunt =

American politician

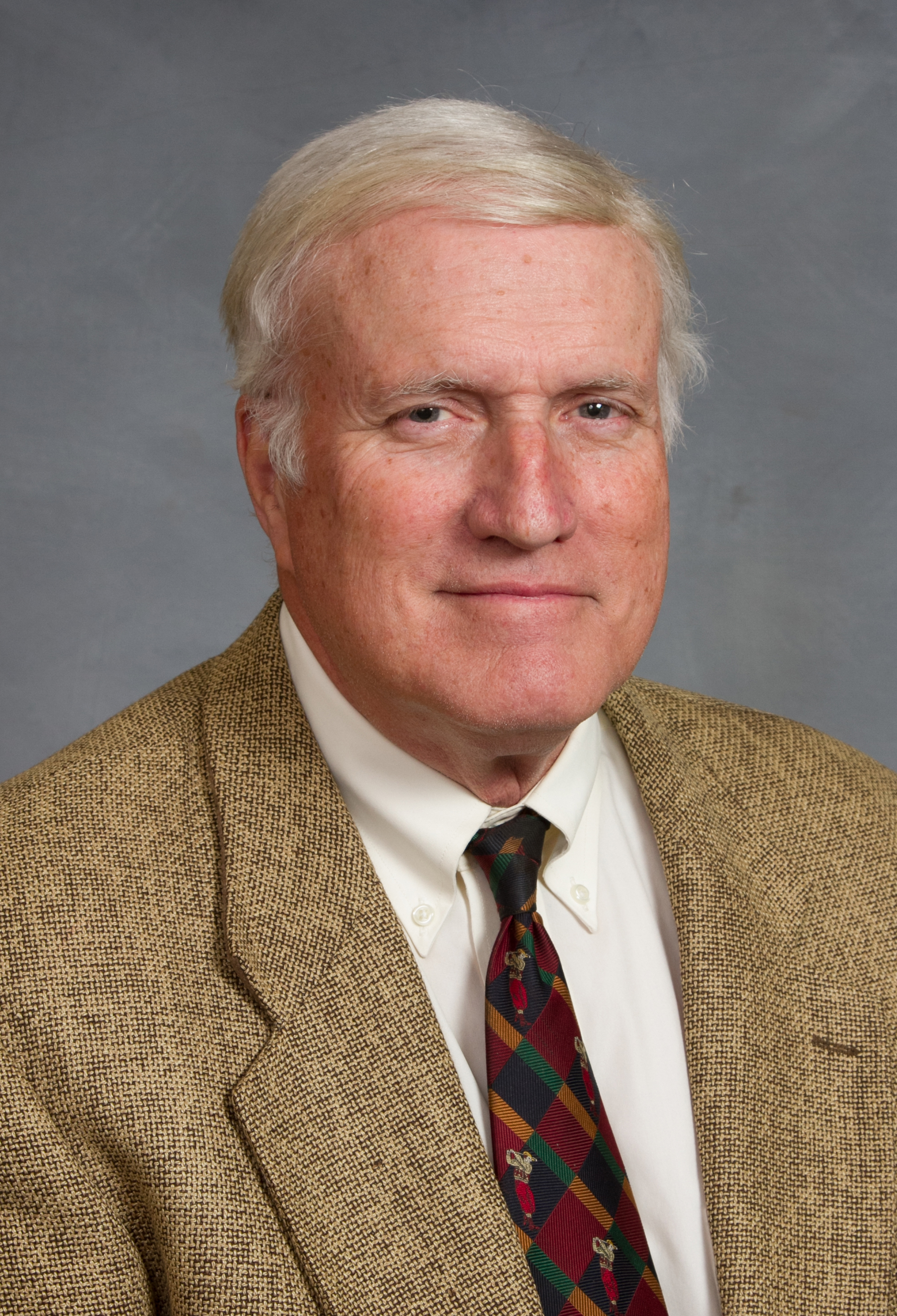

Member of the North Carolina Senate from the 15th district
- In office January 1, 2005 – January 1, 2015
- Preceded by: John Carrington
- Succeeded by: John Alexander

Raleigh City Council Member At-Large
- In office 2001–2004

Personal details
- Born: September 17, 1942 (age 84) Thomasville, North Carolina, U.S.
- Party: Republican
- Education: Hampden–Sydney College (BS); University of Pennsylvania (MBA)
- Occupation: President, HMC Corporation
- Website: www.nealhunt.com

Neal K. Hunt (born September 17, 1942) is an American real estate businessman and politician who served as a Republican member of the North Carolina General Assembly representing constituents in Wake County in the fifteenth district of the North Carolina Senate. He was first elected to the Senate in 2004. He previously served two terms in an at-large seat on the Raleigh City Council.

== Early life ==
Neal Hunt was born in Thomasville, North Carolina on September 17, 1942, but grew up in the Raleigh area graduating from Ravenscroft School in 1960. He then went on to receive his BS in Spanish from Hampden–Sydney College in 1964 and an MBA from Wharton School in 1968.

Hunt went to work for Wachovia in Raleigh becoming a regional manager for commercial real estate lending. Later, he started his own real estate development firm.

== Political career ==
Hunt served for seven years on the Raleigh Planning Commission from 1993 to 2000. He then ran for an at-large seat on the Raleigh City Council winning two terms. He served from 2001 until his election to State Senate in 2004.

Hunt first won election to the 15th district of the North Carolina Senate in 2004 after defeating a five-term incumbent John H. Carrington and newcomer Jean Koch in the Republican primary with 62.36% of the vote. Hunt then won the general election race against Libertarian candidate Lee Griffin with 84.58% of the vote.

In 2006, Hunt did not face any primary challenge and went on to face the Democratic nominee, community volunteer and former teacher Dorothy "Gerry" Bowles, who had previously lost to Carrington for the 15th district seat in 2002. Hunt defeated Bowles 54.9%–45.1%. Neither Hunt nor his general election challengers faced any primaries in 2008. The general election featured Hunt vs. the Democratic nominee, financial adviser Chris Mintz, and the Libertarian candidate Jan MacKay. Hunt won re-election with 52.83% of the vote. Again having no primary challenger for his seat in 2010, Hunt faced Democratic candidate and state employee Charles Malone, in the general election. Hunt defeated Malone 60.55%–39.45%.

Hunt was only challenged in the general election in 2012 by Sig Hutchinson, a Democratic marketing consultant and environmental activist. Hunt defeated Hutchinson, 55.82%–44.18%.

Hunt is Co-Chair of the Appropriations/Base Budget standing committee in the state senate.

North Carolina Senate
Preceded by John Carrington	Member of the North Carolina Senate from the 15th district 2005-2015	Succeeded by John Alexander
