= Jay Chaudhuri =

American politician

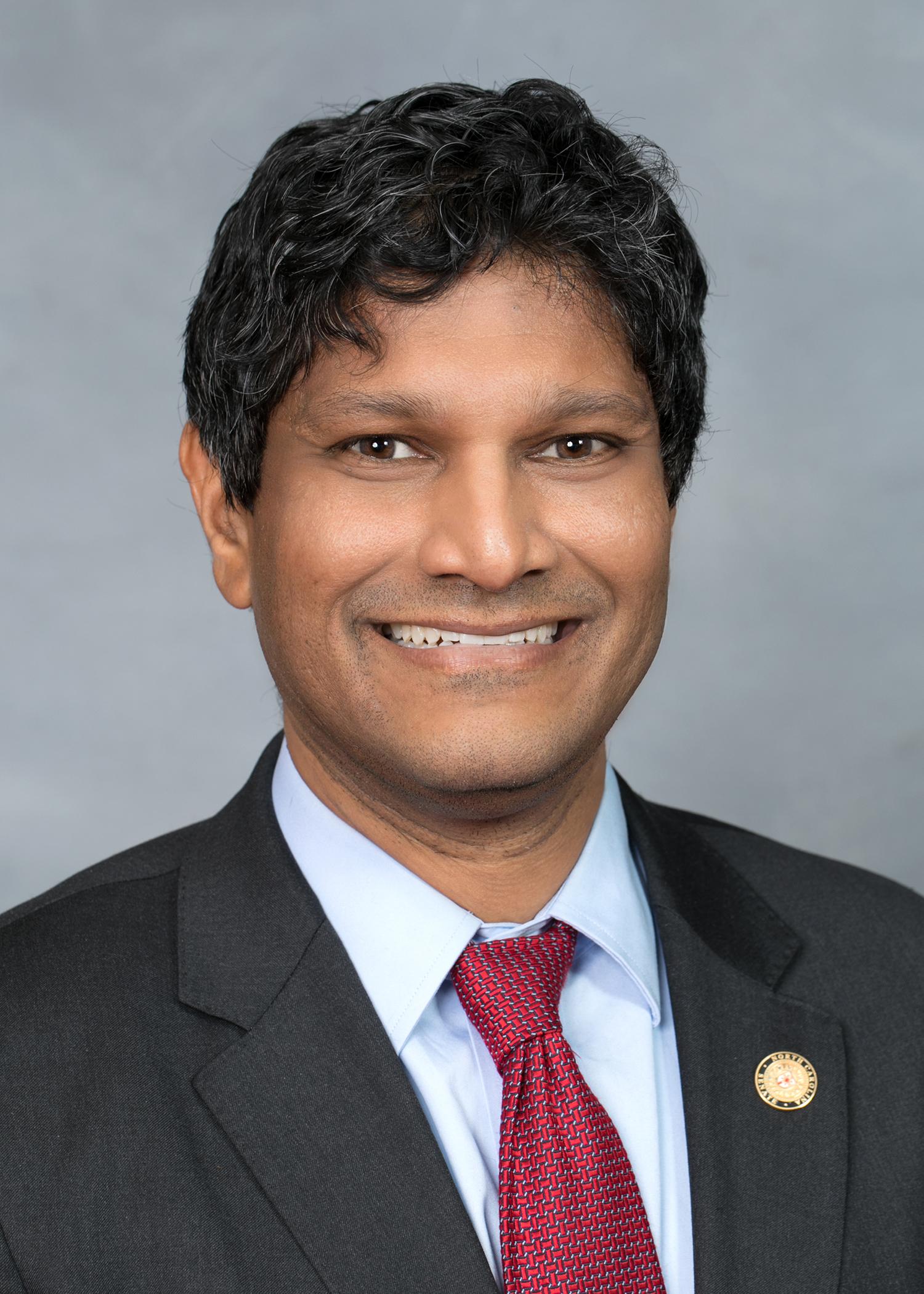

Minority Whip of the North Carolina Senate
- Incumbent
- Assumed office January 9, 2019
- Preceded by: Terry Van Duyn

Member of the North Carolina Senate
- Incumbent
- Assumed office April 19, 2016
- Preceded by: Josh Stein
- Constituency: 16th District (2016-2019); 15th District (2019-present)

Personal details
- Born: Jyoti Chaudhuri; June 8, 1969 (age 57) Chattanooga, Tennessee, U.S.
- Party: Democratic
- Spouse: Sejal
- Children: 2
- Education: Davidson College (B.A.); Columbia University (M.I.A.); North Carolina Central University (J.D.)
- Occupation: Attorney
- Website: JayForNC.com

Jay Chaudhuri (born August 6, 1969) is an American attorney, professor, politician and a Democratic member of the North Carolina Senate. First appointed to fill a vacancy in April 2016 caused by the resignation of Josh Stein (to run for North Carolina Attorney General), Chaudhuri was later elected and re-elected, becoming North Carolina's first Indian-American state legislator. In January 2019, he was elected by his colleagues to serve as Senate Minority (Democratic) Whip, the second-highest ranking position in the Democratic caucus.

== Early life and education ==
Born in Chattanooga, Tennessee to Bengali immigrants from India, Chaudhuri moved to Fayetteville, North Carolina when he was 3. Chaudhuri went on to study at Terry Sanford High School in Fayetteville, later attending Davidson College, Columbia University, and finally North Carolina Central University School of Law.

== Career ==
A longtime aide to then-State Senator and state Attorney General Roy Cooper, and later to state treasurer Janet Cowell, Chaudhuri taught part-time as an adjunct law professor at North Carolina Central University for two years. In 2016, Chaudhuri joined plaintiff law firm Cohen Milstein as a part-time counsel.

== Election history ==
=== 2024 ===
N.C. Senate district General Election
Party	Candidate	Votes	%
Democratic	Jay Chaudhuri (incumbent)	67,355	65.95%
Republican	David Bankert	30,867	30.22%
Libertarian	Kat McDonald	3,915	3.83%
Total votes		102,137	100%
Democratic hold			

=== 2022 ===
N.C. Senate 15th district General Election
Party	Candidate	Votes	%
Democratic	Jay Chaudhuri (incumbent)	52,472	67.52%
Republican	Emanuela Prister	22,776	29.31%
Libertarian	Sammie Brooks	2,463	3.17%
Total votes		77,711	100%
Democratic hold			

=== 2020 ===
N.C. Senate 15th district General Election
Party	Candidate	Votes	%
Democratic	Jay Chaudhuri (incumbent)	71,700	58.01%
Republican	Mario J. Lomuscio	45,457	36.78%
Libertarian	Kat McDonald	6,441	5.21%
Total votes		123,598	100%
Democratic hold			

=== 2018 ===
N.C. Senate 15th district General Election
Party	Candidate	Votes	%
Democratic	Jay Chaudhuri (incumbent)	60,805	73.10%
Republican	Alan David Michael	19,365	23.28%
Libertarian	Brian Lewis	3,005	3.61%
Total votes		83,175	100%
Democratic hold			

=== 2016 ===
N. C. Senate 16th district General Election
Party	Candidate	Votes	%
Democratic	Jay Chaudhuri (incumbent)	68,842	65.33%
Republican	Eric Weaver	36,530	34.67%
Total votes		105,372	100%
Democratic hold			

N.C. Senate 16th District Democratic Primary Election
Party	Candidate	Votes	%
Democratic	Jay Chaudhuri	20,232	62.93%
Democratic	Ellis Hankins	11,916	37.07%
Total votes		32,148	100%

North Carolina Senate
Preceded by Josh Stein	Member of the North Carolina Senate from the 16th district 2016–2019	Succeeded by Wiley Nickel
Preceded by John Alexander	Member of the North Carolina Senate from the 15th district 2019–present	Incumbent
