= Gale Adcock =

American politician (born 1954)

Senator Gale Adcock
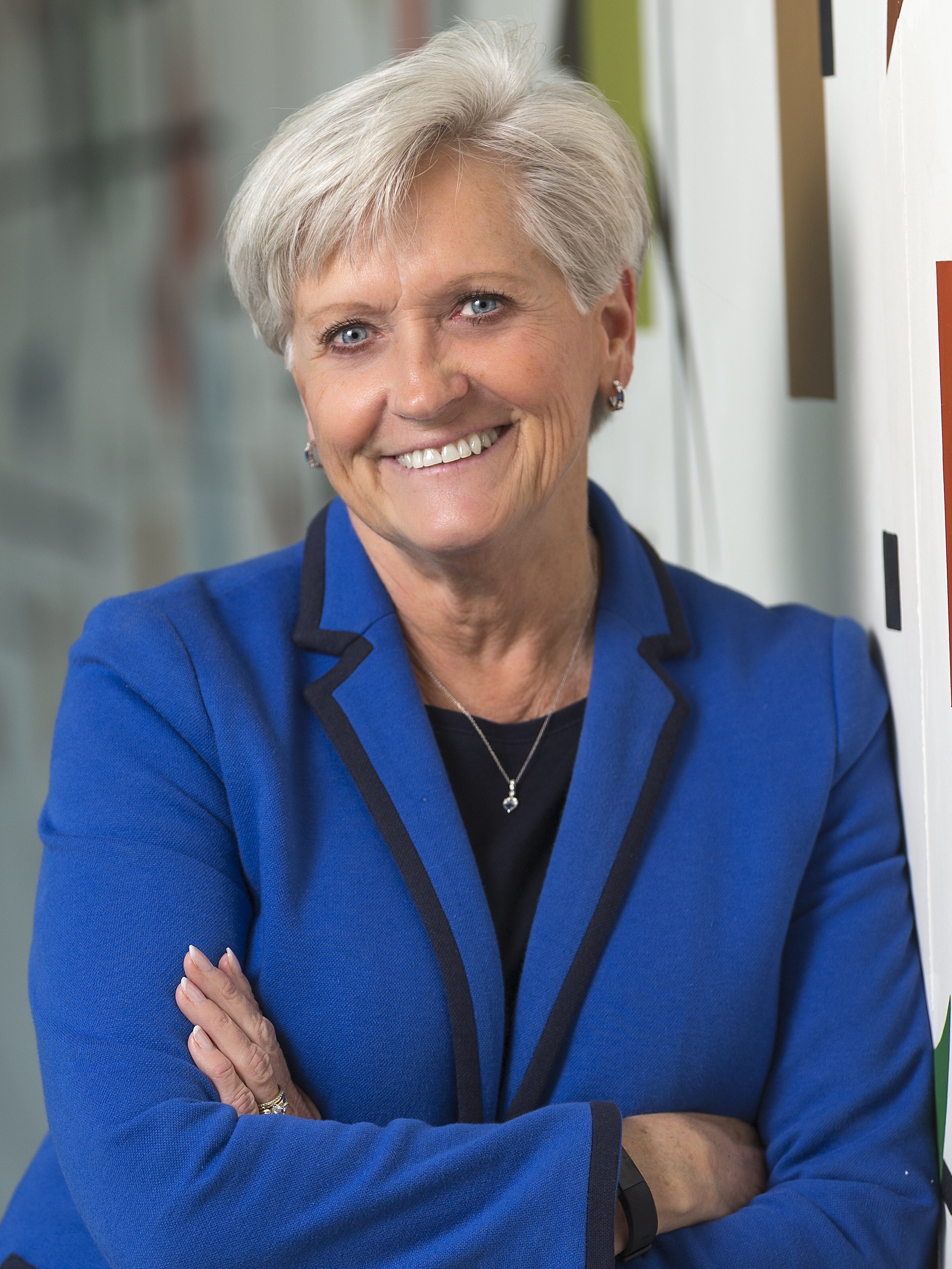

Member of the North Carolina Senate from the 16th district
- Incumbent
- Assumed office January 1, 2023
- Preceded by: Wiley Nickel

Deputy Minority Leader of the North Carolina House of Representatives
- In office January 1, 2021 – January 1, 2023
- Leader: Robert Reives
- Preceded by: Robert Reives
- Succeeded by: Ashton Clemmons

Member of the North Carolina House of Representatives from the 41st district
- In office January 1, 2015 – January 1, 2023
- Preceded by: Tom Murry
- Succeeded by: Maria Cervania

Personal details
- Born: January 25, 1954 (age 72) Cary, North Carolina, U.S.
- Party: Democratic
- Spouse: Kevin
- Children: 2
- Education: East Carolina University (BSN); University of North Carolina, Chapel Hill (MSN)

Gale Adcock (born January 25, 1954) is a family nurse practitioner and American politician who has served in the North Carolina Senate representing the 16th district (including constituents in Wake County) since 2023. Adcock previously served in the North Carolina House of Representatives representing the 41st district (including constituents in Wake County) from 2015 to 2023. She also served as Deputy House Minority leader for one term.

== Life and career ==
Adcock was raised in southwestern Virginia. She earned an undergraduate degree in nursing from East Carolina University and a master's of science in nursing from the University of North Carolina at Chapel Hill. She has been a nurse practitioner since 1987 and was Chief Health Officer at SAS Institute before retiring in October 2020. She was elected to the North Carolina House in 2014. She lives in Cary, North Carolina. She previously served on the Cary City Council from 2007 to 2014.

Adcock has served as president of the North Carolina Nurses Association, chair of the North Carolina Center for Nursing, and as a two-term member of the North Carolina Board of Nursing. She is a Fellow of the American Association of Nurse Practitioners, a Fellow of the National Academies of Practice, and a Fellow of the American Academy of Nursing. She has received numerous awards and honors, including the Barbara Thoman Curtis Award for political activism from the American Nurses Association in 2018.

== Electoral history ==
=== 2022 ===
North Carolina Senate 16th district general election, 2022
Party	Candidate	Votes	%
Democratic	Gale Adcock	49,204	65.18%
Republican	James Powers	23,161	30.68%
Libertarian	Dee Watson	1,771	2.35%
Green	Michael Trudeau	1,348	1.79%
Total votes		75,484	100%
Democratic hold			

=== 2020 ===
North Carolina House of Representatives 41st district general election, 2020
Party	Candidate	Votes	%
Democratic	Gale Adcock (incumbent)	40,934	61.99%
Republican	Scott Populorum	23,040	34.89%
Libertarian	Guy Meilleur	2,057	3.12%
Total votes		66,031	100%
Democratic hold			

=== 2018 ===
North Carolina House of Representatives 41st district general election, 2018
Party	Candidate	Votes	%
Democratic	Gale Adcock (incumbent)	26,631	66.76%
Republican	Emmanuel Wilder	13,262	33.24%
Total votes		39,893	100%
Democratic hold			

=== 2016 ===
North Carolina House of Representatives 41st district general election, 2016
Party	Candidate	Votes	%
Democratic	Gale Adcock (incumbent)	27,491	56.99%
Republican	Chris M. Shoffner	20,745	43.01%
Total votes		48,236	100%
Democratic hold			

=== 2014 ===
North Carolina House of Representatives 41st district general election, 2014
Party	Candidate	Votes	%
Democratic	Gale Adcock	15,160	51.32%
Republican	Tom Murry (incumbent)	14,383	48.68%
Total votes		29,543	100%
Democratic gain from Republican			

== Committee assignments ==
=== 2021-2022 session ===
- Appropriations
- Appropriations - Health and Human Services
- Health
- Commerce
- Regulatory Reform
- Rules, Calendar, and Operations of the House

=== 2019-2020 session ===
- Health
- Education - Universities
- Commerce
- Finance
- Regulatory Reform
- Rules, Calendar, and Operations of the House

=== 2017-2018 session ===
- Appropriations
- Appropriations - General Government
- Appropriations - Information Technology
- Homeland Security, Military, and Veterans Affairs
- Wildlife Resources
- Health

=== 2015-2016 session ===
- Appropriations
- Appropriations - General Government
- Homeland Security, Military, and Veterans Affairs
- Wildlife Resources

North Carolina House of Representatives
Preceded by Tom Murry	Member of the North Carolina House of Representatives from the 41st district 2015–2023	Succeeded by Maria Cervania
Political offices
Preceded by Robert Reives	Deputy Minority Leader of the North Carolina House of Representatives; 2021–2023	Succeeded by Ashton Clemmons
North Carolina Senate
Preceded by Wiley Nickel	Member of the North Carolina Senate from the 16th district 2023–Present	Incumbent
