= North Carolina's 15th Senate district =

American legislative district

North Carolina's 15th State Senate district
Senator
Jay Chaudhuri; D–Raleigh
- Demographics: 67% White; 13% Black; 10% Hispanic; 5% Asian; 4% Multiracial
- Population (2023): 193,730

North Carolina's 15th Senate district is one of 50 districts in the state senate of the U.S. state of North Carolina. It has been represented by Democrat Jay Chaudhuri since 2019.

== Geography ==
Since 2003, the district has covered part of Wake County. The district overlaps with the 34th, 40th, 49th, and 66th state house districts.

== District officeholders since 1973 ==
=== Multi-member district ===
Senator	Party	Dates	Notes	Senator	Party	Dates	Notes	Counties
Wesley Webster (Madison)	Democratic	January 1, 1973 – January 1, 1979		Fred Folger Jr. (Mount Airy)	Democratic	January 1, 1973 – January 1, 1975	Redistricted from the 21st district.	1973–1983; All of Ashe, Alleghany, Surry, Stokes, Rockingham, and Caswell counties.
Wesley Webster (Madison)	Democratic	January 1, 1973 – January 1, 1979		George Marion Jr. (Dobson)	Democratic	January 1, 1975 – January 1, 1983	Redistricted to the 24th district.	1973–1983; All of Ashe, Alleghany, Surry, Stokes, Rockingham, and Caswell counties.
Conrad Duncan Jr. (Stoneville)	Democratic	January 1, 1979 – January 1, 1983	Redistricted to the 24th district.	George Marion Jr. (Dobson)	Democratic	January 1, 1975 – January 1, 1983	Redistricted to the 24th district.	1973–1983; All of Ashe, Alleghany, Surry, Stokes, Rockingham, and Caswell counties.

=== Single-member district ===
Senator	Party	Dates	Notes	Counties
Robert Warren Sr. (Benson)	Democratic	January 1, 1983 – January 1, 1989	Redistricted from the 9th district.	1983–1993; All of Johnston and Sampson counties.
Leo Daughtry (Smithfield)	Republican	January 1, 1989 – January 1, 1993	Redistricted to the 11th district and retired to run for State House.	1983–1993; All of Johnston and Sampson counties.
Elaine Marshall (Lillington)	Democratic	January 1, 1993 – January 1, 1995	Lost re-election.	1993–2003; All of Harnett County. Parts of Lee, Johnston, and Sampson counties.
Vacant		January 1, 1995 – April 3, 1995	Seat vacant and special election called after 1994 election resulted in a tie.	1993–2003; All of Harnett County. Parts of Lee, Johnston, and Sampson counties.
Daniel Page (Coats)	Republican	April 3, 1995 – January 1, 1999	Elected to the vacant seat. Retired to run for Congress.	1993–2003; All of Harnett County. Parts of Lee, Johnston, and Sampson counties.
Oscar Harris (Dunn)	Democratic	January 1, 1999 – January 1, 2003	Redistricted to the 10th district and retired.	1993–2003; All of Harnett County. Parts of Lee, Johnston, and Sampson counties.
John Carrington (Raleigh)	Republican	January 1, 2003 – January 1, 2005	Redistricted from the 36th district. Lost re-nomination.	2003–Present; Part of Wake County.
Neal Hunt (Raleigh)	Republican	January 1, 2005 – January 1, 2015	Retired.	2003–Present; Part of Wake County.
John Alexander (Raleigh)	Republican	January 1, 2015 – January 1, 2019	Redistricted to the 18th district.	2003–Present; Part of Wake County.
Jay Chaudhuri (Raleigh)	Democratic	January 1, 2019 – Present	Redistricted from the 16th district.	2003–Present; Part of Wake County.

== Election results ==
=== 2024 ===
North Carolina Senate district general election, 2024
Party	Candidate	Votes	%
Democratic	Jay Chaudhuri (incumbent)	67,355	65.95%
Republican	David Bankert	30,867	30.22%
Libertarian	Kat McDonald	3,915	3.83%
Total votes		102,137	100%
Democratic hold			

=== 2022 ===
North Carolina Senate 15th district general election, 2022
Party	Candidate	Votes	%
Democratic	Jay Chaudhuri (incumbent)	52,472	67.52%
Republican	Emanuela Prister	22,776	29.31%
Libertarian	Sammie Brooks	2,463	3.17%
Total votes		77,711	100%
Democratic hold			

=== 2020 ===
North Carolina Senate 15th district general election, 2020
Party	Candidate	Votes	%
Democratic	Jay Chaudhuri (incumbent)	71,700	58.01%
Republican	Mario J. Lomuscio	45,457	36.78%
Libertarian	Kat McDonald	6,441	5.21%
Total votes		123,598	100%
Democratic hold			

=== 2018 ===
North Carolina Senate 15th district general election, 2018
Party	Candidate	Votes	%
Democratic	Jay Chaudhuri (incumbent)	60,805	73.10%
Republican	Alan David Michael	19,365	23.28%
Libertarian	Brian Lewis	3,005	3.61%
Total votes		83,175	100%
Democratic hold			

=== 2016 ===
North Carolina Senate 15th district general election, 2016
Party	Candidate	Votes	%
Republican	John Alexander (incumbent)	58,999	50.01%
Democratic	Lauren Deegan-Fricke	53,905	45.69%
Libertarian	Brad Hessel	5,081	4.31%
Total votes		117,985	100%
Republican hold			

=== 2014 ===
North Carolina Senate 15th district general election, 2014
Party	Candidate	Votes	%
Republican	Jim Fulghum	10,188	80.06%
Republican	Apryl Major	2,537	19.94%
Total votes		12,725	100%

North Carolina Senate 15th district general election, 2014
Party	Candidate	Votes	%
Republican	John Alexander	41,366	50.43%
Democratic	Tom Bradshaw	40,665	49.57%
Total votes		82,031	100%
Republican hold			

=== 2012 ===
North Carolina Senate 15th district general election, 2012
Party	Candidate	Votes	%
Republican	Neal Hunt (incumbent)	61,981	55.82%
Democratic	Sig Hutchinson	49,050	44.18%
Total votes		111,031	100%
Republican hold			

=== 2010 ===
North Carolina Senate 15th district general election, 2010
Party	Candidate	Votes	%
Republican	Neal Hunt (incumbent)	44,397	60.55%
Democratic	Charles Malone	28,928	39.45%
Total votes		73,325	100%
Republican hold			

=== 2008 ===
North Carolina Senate 15th district general election, 2008
Party	Candidate	Votes	%
Republican	Neal Hunt (incumbent)	56,873	52.83%
Democratic	Chris Mintz	46,175	42.89%
Libertarian	Jan MacKay	4,602	4.27%
Total votes		107,650	100%
Republican hold			

=== 2006 ===
North Carolina Senate 15th district general election, 2006
Party	Candidate	Votes	%
Republican	Neal Hunt (incumbent)	31,478	54.90%
Democratic	Dorothy (Gerry) Bowles	25,854	45.10%
Total votes		57,332	100%
Republican hold			

=== 2004 ===
North Carolina Senate 15th district Republican primary election, 2004
Party	Candidate	Votes	%
Republican	Neal Hunt	7,686	62.36%
Republican	John Carrington (incumbent)	3,880	31.48%
Republican	Jean Koch	759	6.16%
Total votes		12,325	100%

North Carolina Senate 15th district general election, 2004
Party	Candidate	Votes	%
Republican	Neal Hunt	59,970	84.58%
Libertarian	Lee Griffin	10,934	15.42%
Total votes		70,904	100%
Republican hold			

=== 2002 ===
North Carolina Senate 15th district Republican primary election, 2002
Party	Candidate	Votes	%
Republican	John Carrington (incumbent)	8,126	70.48%
Republican	George C. Mackie Jr.	3,403	29.52%
Total votes		11,529	100%

North Carolina Senate 15th district general election, 2002
Party	Candidate	Votes	%
Republican	John Carrington (incumbent)	36,177	57.08%
Democratic	Dorothy Gerry Bowles	25,581	40.36%
Libertarian	Nathan Wilson	1,626	2.57%
Total votes		63,384	100%
Republican hold			

=== 2000 ===
North Carolina Senate 15th district general election, 2000
Party	Candidate	Votes	%
Democratic	Oscar Harris (incumbent)	30,148	61.15%
Republican	John Hairr	19,154	38.85%
Total votes		49,302	100%
Democratic hold			
