= John M. Alexander Jr. =

American politician

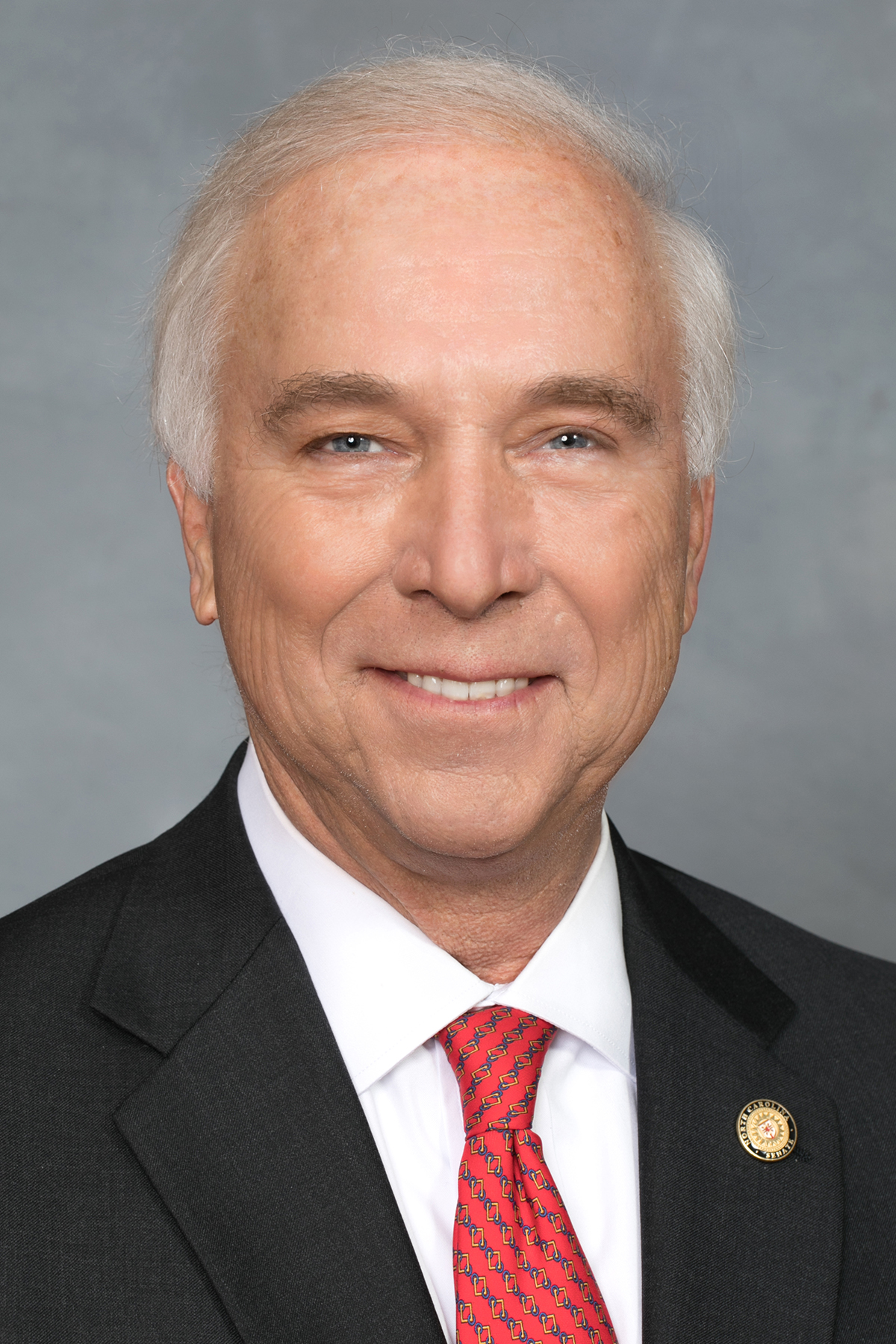

Member of the North Carolina Senate
- In office January 1, 2015 – January 1, 2021
- Preceded by: Neal Hunt (15th); Chad Barefoot (18th)
- Succeeded by: Sarah Crawford
- Constituency: 15th district (2015-2019); 18th district (2019-2021)

Personal details
- Born: October 1, 1949 (age 76) Raleigh, North Carolina, U.S.
- Party: Republican

John M. Alexander Jr. (born October 1, 1949) is an American politician who served in the North Carolina Senate from 2015 through Jan. 1, 2021. He represented the 15th district from 2015 until 2019, and the 18th district from 2019 through Jan. 1, 2021.

Alexander announced on September 12, 2019 that he would not seek re-election in the 2020 elections.

North Carolina Senate
Preceded by Neal Hunt	Member of the North Carolina Senate from the 15th district 2015–2019	Succeeded by Jay Chaudhuri
Preceded by Chad Barefoot	Member of the North Carolina Senate from the 18th district 2019–2021	Succeeded by Sarah Crawford
