= 2006 North Carolina Senate election =

- November 7, 2006

All 50 seats in the North Carolina Senate 26 (without Lieutenant Governor) seats needed for a majority
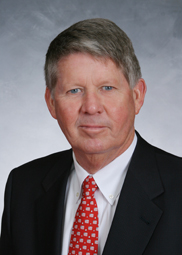

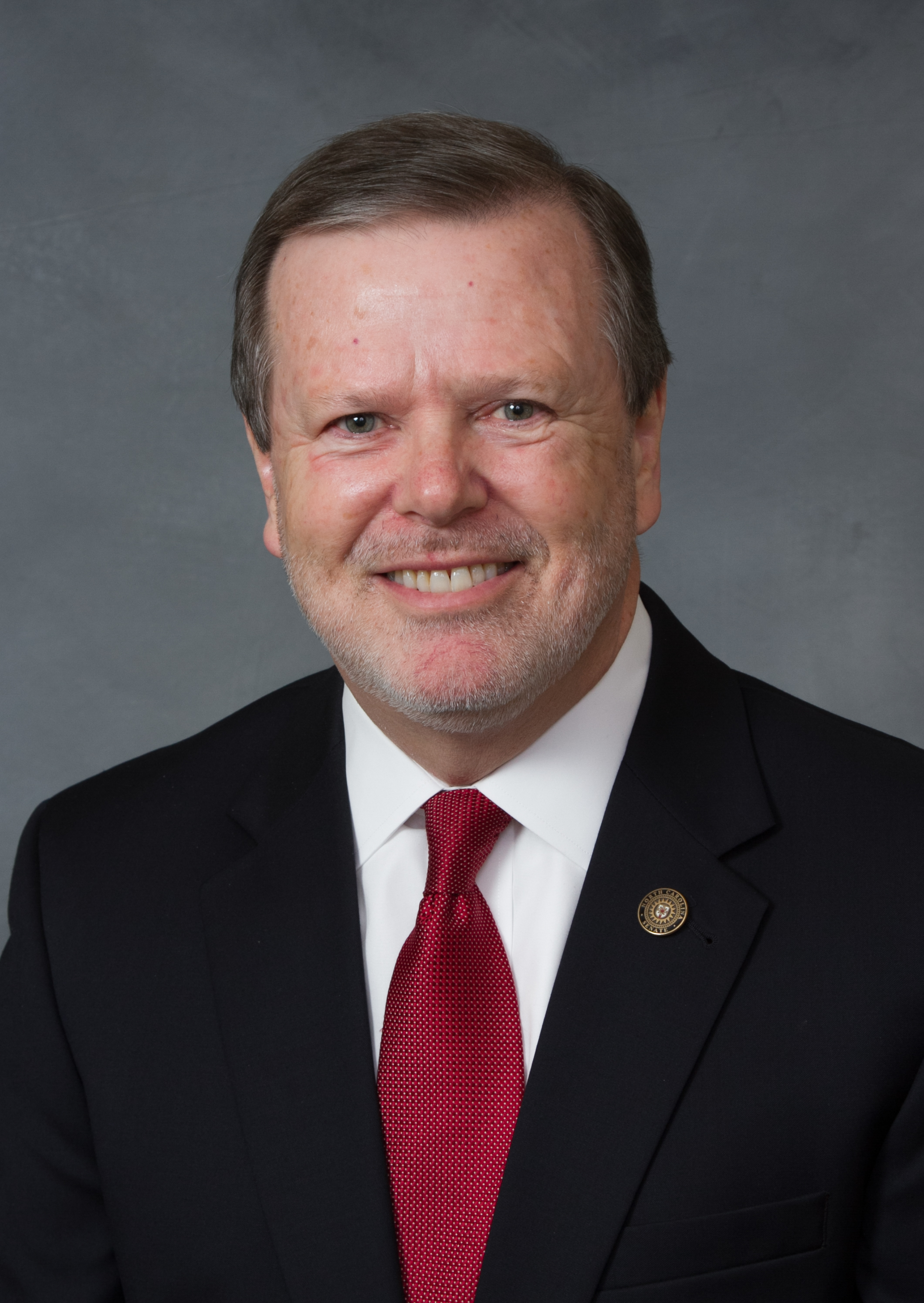
	Majority party	Minority party
Leader	Marc Basnight	Phil Berger
Party	Democratic	Republican
Leader since	January 1, 1993	January 1, 2005
Leader's seat	1st - Manteo	26th - Eden
Last election	29	21
Seats won	31	19
Seat change	▲2	▼2
Popular vote	893,449	828,849
Percentage	51.88%	48.12%
- Results: Democratic hold Democratic gain Republican hold Republican gain
President pro tempore before election
Marc Basnight
Democratic
Elected President pro tempore
Marc Basnight
Democratic

The 2006 North Carolina Senate election was held on November 7, 2006, to elect members to all fifty seats in the North Carolina Senate. The election coincided with the elections for other offices, including the U.S. House of Representatives and state house. The primary election was held on May 2, 2006, with primary run-offs occurring on May 30 and September 12, 2006. The Democratic Party made a net gain of 2 seats in the state senate.

== Results summary ==
District	Incumbent	Party	Elected	Party
1st	Marc Basnight	Dem	Marc Basnight	Dem
2nd	C. W. "Pete" Bland	Dem	Jean Preston	Rep
3rd	Clark Jenkins	Dem	Clark Jenkins	Dem
4th	Robert Lee Holloman	Dem	Robert Lee Holloman	Dem
5th	John Kerr	Dem	John Kerr	Dem
6th	Harry Brown	Rep	Harry Brown	Rep
7th	Doug Berger	Dem	Doug Berger	Dem
8th	R. C. Soles Jr.	Dem	R. C. Soles Jr.	Dem
9th	Julia Boseman	Dem	Julia Boseman	Dem
10th	Charles W. Albertson	Dem	Charles W. Albertson	Dem
11th	A. B. Swindell	Dem	A. B. Swindell	Dem
12th	Fred Smith	Rep	Fred Smith	Rep
13th	David Weinstein	Dem	David Weinstein	Dem
14th	Vernon Malone	Dem	Vernon Malone	Dem
15th	Neal Hunt	Rep	Neal Hunt	Rep
16th	Janet Cowell	Dem	Janet Cowell	Dem
17th	Richard Y. Stevens	Rep	Richard Y. Stevens	Rep
18th	Bob Atwater	Dem	Bob Atwater	Dem
19th	Tony Rand	Dem	Tony Rand	Dem
20th	Jeanne Hopkins Lucas	Dem	Jeanne Hopkins Lucas	Dem
21st	Larry Shaw	Dem	Larry Shaw	Dem
22nd	Harris Blake	Rep	Harris Blake	Rep
23rd	Eleanor Kinnaird	Dem	Eleanor Kinnaird	Dem
24th	Hugh Webster	Rep	Tony Foriest	Dem
25th	William R. Purcell	Dem	William R. Purcell	Dem
26th	Phil Berger	Rep	Phil Berger	Rep
27th	Kay Hagan	Dem	Kay Hagan	Dem
28th	Katie G. Dorsett	Dem	Katie G. Dorsett	Dem
29th	Jerry W. Tillman	Rep	Jerry W. Tillman	Rep
30th	Don W. East	Rep	Don W. East	Rep
31st	Pete Brunstetter	Rep	Pete Brunstetter	Rep
32nd	Linda Garrou	Dem	Linda Garrou	Dem
33rd	Stan Bingham	Rep	Stan Bingham	Rep
34th	Andrew C. Brock	Rep	Andrew C. Brock	Rep
35th	Eddie Goodall	Rep	Eddie Goodall	Rep
36th	Fletcher L. Hartsell Jr.	Rep	Fletcher L. Hartsell Jr.	Rep
37th	Dan Clodfelter	Dem	Dan Clodfelter	Dem
38th	Charlie Dannelly	Dem	Charlie Dannelly	Dem
39th	Robert Pittenger	Rep	Robert Pittenger	Rep
40th	Malcolm Graham	Dem	Malcolm Graham	Dem
41st	James Forrester	Rep	James Forrester	Rep
42nd	Austin M. Allran	Rep	Austin M. Allran	Rep
43rd	David W. Hoyle	Dem	David W. Hoyle	Dem
44th	Jim Jacumin	Rep	Jim Jacumin	Rep
45th	John Garwood	Rep	Steve Goss	Dem
46th	Walter Dalton	Dem	Walter Dalton	Dem
47th	Keith Presnell	Rep	Joe Sam Queen	Dem
48th	Tom Apodaca	Rep	Tom Apodaca	Rep
49th	Martin Nesbitt	Dem	Martin Nesbitt	Dem
50th	John J. Snow Jr.	Dem	John J. Snow Jr.	Dem

† - Incumbent not seeking re-election

Party	Candi- dates	Votes		Seats		
Party	Candi- dates	No.	%	No.	+/–	%
Democratic Party	40	893,449	51.875%	31	▲2	62%
Republican Party	38	828,849	48.125%	19	▼2	38%
Total	78	1,722,298	100.00%	50	Steady	100.00%

Senate seats
Democratic	62%
Republican	38%

Popular vote
Democratic	51.875%
Republican	48.125%

=== Incumbents defeated in primary election ===
- John Garwood (R-District 45), defeated by David Blust (R)

=== Incumbents defeated in general election ===
- C. W. "Pete" Bland (D-District 2), defeated by Jean Preston (R)
- Hugh Webster (R-District 24), defeated by Tony Foriest (D)
- Keith Presnell (R-District 47), defeated by Joe Sam Queen (D)

=== Open seats that changed parties ===
- John Garwood (R-District 45) lost re-nomination, seat won by Steve Goss (D)

== Predictions ==
Source	Ranking	As of
Rothenberg	Likely D	November 4, 2006

== Detailed results ==
=== Districts 1–25 ===
==== District 1 ====
Incumbent Democrat President Pro Tempore Marc Basnight has represented the 1st district since 1985.

North Carolina Senate 1st district general election, 2006
Party	Candidate	Votes	%
Democratic	Marc Basnight (incumbent)	30,398	68.84%
Republican	Ron Toppin	13,758	31.16%
Total votes		44,156	100%
Democratic hold			

==== District 2 ====
Incumbent Democrat C. W. “Pete” Bland has represented the 2nd district since his appointment in 2006. He lost re-election to Republican Jean Preston.

North Carolina Senate 2nd district general election, 2006
Party	Candidate	Votes	%
Republican	Jean Preston	28,340	57.38%
Democratic	C. W. "Pete" Bland (incumbent)	21,052	42.62%
Total votes		49,392	100%
Republican gain from Democratic			

==== District 3 ====
Incumbent Democrat Clark Jenkins has represented the 3rd district since 2003.

North Carolina Senate 3rd district general election, 2006
Party	Candidate	Votes	%
Democratic	Clark Jenkins (incumbent)	19,633	100%
Total votes		19,633	100%
Democratic hold			

==== District 4 ====
Incumbent Democrat Robert Lee Holloman has represented the 4th district since 2003.

North Carolina Senate 4th district general election, 2006
Party	Candidate	Votes	%
Democratic	Robert Lee Holloman (incumbent)	19,091	69.67%
Republican	Kenneth R. "Ken" Chandler	8,312	30.33%
Total votes		27,403	100%
Democratic hold			

==== District 5 ====
Incumbent Democrat John Kerr has represented the 5th district and its predecessors since 1993.

North Carolina Senate 5th district general election, 2006
Party	Candidate	Votes	%
Democratic	John Kerr (incumbent)	17,865	58.43%
Republican	Todd Siebels	12,711	41.57%
Total votes		30,576	100%
Democratic hold			

==== District 6 ====
Incumbent Republican Harry Brown has represented the 6th district since 2005.

North Carolina Senate 6th district general election, 2006
Party	Candidate	Votes	%
Republican	Harry Brown (incumbent)	13,917	64.73%
Democratic	Carolyn Pittman-Dorsey	7,582	35.27%
Total votes		21,499	100%
Republican hold			

==== District 7 ====
Incumbent Democrat Doug Berger has represented the 7th district since 2005.

North Carolina Senate 7th district general election, 2006
Party	Candidate	Votes	%
Democratic	Doug Berger (incumbent)	22,225	60.64%
Republican	Chuck Stires	14,423	39.36%
Total votes		36,648	100%
Democratic hold			

==== District 8 ====
Incumbent Democrat R. C. Soles Jr. has represented the 8th district and its predecessors since 1977.

North Carolina Senate 8th district general election, 2006
Party	Candidate	Votes	%
Democratic	R. C. Soles Jr. (incumbent)	26,407	52.59%
Republican	Bill Fairley	23,802	47.41%
Total votes		50,209	100%
Democratic hold			

==== District 9 ====
Incumbent Democrat Julia Boseman has represented the 9th district since 2005.

North Carolina Senate 9th district general election, 2006
Party	Candidate	Votes	%
Democratic	Julia Boseman (incumbent)	27,804	62.99%
Republican	Al Roseman	16,333	37.01%
Total votes		44,137	100%
Democratic hold			

==== District 10 ====
Incumbent Democrat Charles W. Albertson has represented the 10th district and its predecessors since 1993.

North Carolina Senate 10th district general election, 2006
Party	Candidate	Votes	%
Democratic	Charles W. Albertson (incumbent)	20,673	64.47%
Republican	Adrain R. Arnett	11,395	35.53%
Total votes		32,068	100%
Democratic hold			

==== District 11 ====
Incumbent Democrat A. B. Swindell has represented the 11th district and its predecessors since 2001.

North Carolina Senate 11th district general election, 2006
Party	Candidate	Votes	%
Democratic	A. B. Swindell (incumbent)	18,900	61.63%
Republican	Al Lytton	11,768	38.37%
Total votes		30,668	100%
Democratic hold			

==== District 12 ====
Incumbent Republican Fred Smith has represented the 12th district since 2003.

North Carolina Senate 12th district general election, 2006
Party	Candidate	Votes	%
Republican	Fred Smith (incumbent)	23,872	64.86%
Democratic	Sherry M. Altman	12,931	35.14%
Total votes		36,803	100%
Republican hold			

==== District 13 ====
Incumbent Democrat David Weinstein has represented the 13th district and its predecessors since 1997.

North Carolina Senate 13th district general election, 2006
Party	Candidate	Votes	%
Democratic	David Weinstein (incumbent)	15,992	100%
Total votes		15,992	100%
Democratic hold			

==== District 14 ====
incumbent Democrat Vernon Malone has represented the 14th district since 2003.

North Carolina Senate 14th district general election, 2006
Party	Candidate	Votes	%
Democratic	Vernon Malone (incumbent)	26,404	65.93%
Republican	Richard Doeffinger	13,644	34.07%
Total votes		40,048	100%
Democratic hold			

==== District 15 ====
Incumbent Republican Neal Hunt has represented the 15th district since 2005.

North Carolina Senate 15th district general election, 2006
Party	Candidate	Votes	%
Republican	Neal Hunt (incumbent)	31,478	54.90%
Democratic	Dorothy "Gerry" Bowles	25,854	45.10%
Total votes		57,332	100%
Republican hold			

==== District 16 ====
Incumbent Democrat Janet Cowell has represented the 16th district since 2005.

North Carolina Senate 16th district general election, 2006
Party	Candidate	Votes	%
Democratic	Janet Cowell (incumbent)	30,330	100%
Total votes		30,330	100%
Democratic hold			

==== District 17 ====
Incumbent Republican Richard Y. Stevens has represented the 17th district since 2003.

North Carolina Senate 17th district general election, 2006
Party	Candidate	Votes	%
Republican	Richard Y. Stevens (incumbent)	40,430	100%
Total votes		40,430	100%
Republican hold			

==== District 18 ====
Incumbent Democrat Bob Atwater has represented the 18th district since 2005.

North Carolina Senate 18th district general election, 2006
Party	Candidate	Votes	%
Democratic	Bob Atwater (incumbent)	36,763	100%
Total votes		36,763	100%
Democratic hold			

==== District 19 ====
Incumbent Democratic Majority Leader Tony Rand has represented the 19th district and its predecessors since 1995.

North Carolina Senate 19th district general election, 2006
Party	Candidate	Votes	%
Democratic	Tony Rand (incumbent)	22,731	100%
Total votes		22,731	100%
Democratic hold			

==== District 20 ====
Incumbent Democrat Jeanne Hopkins Lucas has represented the 20th district and its predecessors since 1993.

North Carolina Senate 20th district general election, 2006
Party	Candidate	Votes	%
Democratic	Jeanne Hopkins Lucas (incumbent)	26,760	100%
Total votes		26,760	100%
Democratic hold			

==== District 21 ====
Incumbent Democrat Larry Shaw has represented the 21st district and its predecessors since 1995.

North Carolina Senate 21st district general election, 2006
Party	Candidate	Votes	%
Democratic	Larry Shaw (incumbent)	13,412	61.65%
Republican	Juanita M. Gonzales	8,344	38.35%
Total votes		21,756	100%
Democratic hold			

==== District 22 ====
Incumbent Republican Harris Blake has represented the 22nd district since 2003.

North Carolina Senate 22nd district general election, 2006
Party	Candidate	Votes	%
Republican	Harris Blake (incumbent)	24,490	62.58%
Democratic	Abraham Oudeh	14,644	37.42%
Total votes		39,134	100%
Republican hold			

==== District 23 ====
Incumbent Democrat Eleanor Kinnaird has represented the 23rd district and its predecessors since 1997.

North Carolina Senate 23rd district general election, 2006
Party	Candidate	Votes	%
Democratic	Eleanor Kinnaird (incumbent)	31,947	73.70%
Republican	E. B. Alston	11,400	26.30%
Total votes		43,347	100%
Democratic hold			

==== District 24 ====
Incumbent Republican Hugh Webster has represented the 24th district since 1995. Webster lost re-election to Democrat Tony Foriest.

North Carolina Senate 24th district general election, 2006
Party	Candidate	Votes	%
Democratic	Tony Foriest	16,973	50.69%
Republican	Hugh Webster (incumbent)	16,513	49.31%
Total votes		33,486	100%
Democratic gain from Republican			

==== District 25 ====
Incumbent Democrat William R. Purcell has represented the 25th district and its predecessors since 1997.

North Carolina Senate 25th district general election, 2006
Party	Candidate	Votes	%
Democratic	William R. Purcell (incumbent)	23,436	63.21%
Republican	Douglas Bowen	13,640	37.79%
Total votes		37,076	100%
Democratic hold			

=== Districts 26–50 ===
==== District 26 ====
Incumbent Republican Minority Leader Phil Berger has represented the 26th district since and its predecessors since 2001.

North Carolina Senate 26th district general election, 2006
Party	Candidate	Votes	%
Republican	Phil Berger (incumbent)	26,640	62.38%
Democratic	Rick Miller	16,064	37.62%
Total votes		42,704	100%
Republican hold			

==== District 27 ====
Incumbent Democrat Kay Hagan has represented the 27th district and its predecessors since 1999.

North Carolina Senate 27th district general election, 2006
Party	Candidate	Votes	%
Democratic	Kay Hagan (incumbent)	30,180	100%
Total votes		30,180	100%
Democratic hold			

==== District 28 ====
Incumbent Democrat Katie G. Dorsett has represented the 28th district since 2003.

2008 North Carolina Senate District 28th district general election, 2006
Party	Candidate	Votes	%
Democratic	Katie G. Dorsett (incumbent)	20,955	100%
Total votes		20,955	100%
Democratic hold			

==== District 29 ====
Incumbent Republican Jerry W. Tillman has represented the 29th district since 2003.

North Carolina Senate 29th district general election, 2006
Party	Candidate	Votes	%
Republican	Jerry W. Tillman (incumbent)	24,005	100%
Total votes		24,005	100%
Republican hold			

==== District 30 ====
Incumbent Republican Don W. East has represented the 30th district since 2005.

North Carolina Senate 30th district general election, 2006
Party	Candidate	Votes	%
Republican	Don W. East (incumbent)	25,698	100%
Total votes		25,698	100%
Republican hold			

==== District 31 ====
Incumbent Republican Pete Brunstetter has represented the 31st district since his appointment in 2006, he was elected to a full term.

North Carolina Senate 31st district general election, 2006
Party	Candidate	Votes	%
Republican	Pete Brunstetter (incumbent)	32,077	100%
Total votes		32,077	100%
Republican hold			

==== District 32 ====
Incumbent Democrat Linda Garrou has represented the 32nd district and its predecessors since 1999.

North Carolina Senate 32nd district general election, 2006
Party	Candidate	Votes	%
Democratic	Linda Garrou (incumbent)	19,663	100%
Total votes		19,663	100%
Democratic hold			

==== District 33 ====
Incumbent Republican Stan Bingham has represented the 33rd district and its predecessors since 2001.

North Carolina Senate 33rd district general election, 2006
Party	Candidate	Votes	%
Republican	Stan Bingham (incumbent)	25,469	100%
Total votes		25,469	100%
Republican hold			

==== District 34 ====
Incumbent Republican Andrew C. Brock has represented the 34th district since 2003.

North Carolina Senate 34th district general election, 2006
Party	Candidate	Votes	%
Republican	Andrew C. Brock (incumbent)	21,608	60.60%
Democratic	Larry Brown	14,048	39,40%
Total votes		35,656	100%
Republican hold			

==== District 35 ====
Incumbent Republican Eddie Goodall has represented the 35th district since 2005.

North Carolina Senate District 35th district general election, 2006
Party	Candidate	Votes	%
Republican	Eddie Goodall (incumbent)	29,301	100%
Total votes		29,301	100%
Republican hold			

==== District 36 ====
Incumbent Republican Fletcher L. Hartsell Jr. has represented the 36th district and its predecessors since 1991.

North Carolina Senate 36th district general election, 2006
Party	Candidate	Votes	%
Republican	Fletcher L. Hartsell Jr. (incumbent)	22,269	63.18%
Democratic	Mike Helms	12,978	36.82%
Total votes		35,247	100%
Republican hold			

==== District 37 ====
Incumbent Democrat Dan Clodfelter has represented the 37th district and its predecessors since 1999.

North Carolina Senate 37th district general election, 2006
Party	Candidate	Votes	%
Democratic	Dan Clodfelter (incumbent)	20,018	100%
Total votes		20,018	100%
Democratic hold			

==== District 38 ====
Incumbent Democrat Charlie Dannelly has represented the 38th district and its predecessors since 1995.

North Carolina Senate 38th district general election, 2006
Party	Candidate	Votes	%
Democratic	Charlie Dannelly (incumbent)	20,372	100%
Total votes		20,372	100%
Democratic hold			

==== District 39 ====
Incumbent Republican Robert Pittenger has represented the 39th district and its predecessors since 2003.

North Carolina Senate 39th district general election, 2006
Party	Candidate	Votes	%
Republican	Robert Pittenger (incumbent)	35,503	100%
Total votes		35,503	100%
Republican hold			

==== District 40 ====
Incumbent Democrat Malcolm Graham has represented the 40th district since 2005.

North Carolina Senate 40th district general election, 2006
Party	Candidate	Votes	%
Democratic	Malcolm Graham (incumbent)	21,247	61.48%
Republican	Ed Mulheren	13,314	38.52%
Total votes		34,561	100%
Democratic hold			

==== District 41 ====
Incumbent Republican James Forrester has represented the 41st district and its predecessors since 1991.

North Carolina Senate 41st district general election, 2006
Party	Candidate	Votes	%
Republican	James Forrester (incumbent)	30,320	100%
Total votes		30,320	100%
Republican hold			

==== District 42 ====
Incumbent Republican Austin M. Allran has represented the 42nd district and its predecessors since 1987.

North Carolina Senate 42nd district general election, 2006
Party	Candidate	Votes	%
Republican	Austin M. Allran (incumbent)	22,671	55.87%
Democratic	Lyndon Helton	17,906	44.13%
Total votes		40,577	100%
Republican hold			

==== District 43 ====
Incumbent Democrat David W. Hoyle has represented the 43rd district and its predecessors since 1993.

North Carolina Senate 43rd district general election, 2006
Party	Candidate	Votes	%
Democratic	David W. Hoyle (incumbent)	21,419	100%
Total votes		21,419	100%
Democratic hold			

==== District 44 ====
Incumbent Republican Jim Jacumin has represented the 44th district since 2005.

North Carolina 44th district general election, 2006
Party	Candidate	Votes	%
Republican	Jim Jacumin (incumbent)	26,683	100%
Total votes		26,683	100%
Republican hold			

==== District 45 ====
Incumbent Republican John Garwood has represented the 45th district since 1997. Garwood lost re-nomination to fellow Republican David Blust. Blust was defeated by Democrat Steve Goss.

North Carolina Senate 45th district general election, 2006
Party	Candidate	Votes	%
Democratic	Steve Goss	24,269	50.33%
Republican	David Blust	23,950	49.67%
Total votes		48,219	100%
Democratic gain from Republican			

==== District 46 ====
Incumbent Democrat Walter Dalton has represented the 46th district and its predecessors since 1997.

North Carolina Senate 46th district general election, 2006
Party	Candidate	Votes	%
Democratic	Walter Dalton (incumbent)	22,557	54.42%
Republican	Wes Westmoreland	18,890	45.58%
Total votes		41,447	100%
Democratic hold			

==== District 47 ====
Incumbent Republican Keith Presnell has represented the 47th District since 2005. In a rematch of the 2004 election he lost re-election to Democrat Joe Sam Queen, who had previously represented the 47th district from 2003 to 2005.

North Carolina Senate 47th district general election, 2006
Party	Candidate	Votes	%
Democratic	Joe Sam Queen	27,935	51.29%
Republican	Keith Presnell (incumbent)	26,530	48.71%
Total votes		54,465	100%
Democratic gain from Republican			

==== District 48 ====
Incumbent Republican Tom Apodaca has represented the 48th district since 2003.

North Carolina Senate 48th district general election, 2006
Party	Candidate	Votes	%
Republican	Tom Apodaca (incumbent)	41,210	100%
Total votes		41,210	100%
Republican hold			

==== District 49 ====
Incumbent Democrat Martin Nesbitt has represented the 49th district since 2004.

North Carolina Senate 49th district general election, 2006
Party	Candidate	Votes	%
Democratic	Martin Nesbitt (incumbent)	36,901	65.64%
Republican	R. L. Clark	19,318	34.36%
Total votes		56,219	100%
Democratic hold			

==== District 50 ====
Incumbent Democrat John J. Snow Jr. has represented the 50th district since 2005.

North Carolina Senate 50th district general election, 2006
Party	Candidate	Votes	%
Democratic	John J. Snow Jr. (incumbent)	37,130	59.93%
Republican	Ken McKim	24,823	40.07%
Total votes		61,953	100%
Democratic hold			

== See also ==
- List of North Carolina state legislatures
