= 1942 North Carolina Senate election =

- November 3, 1942

All 50 seats in the North Carolina Senate 26 seats needed for a majority
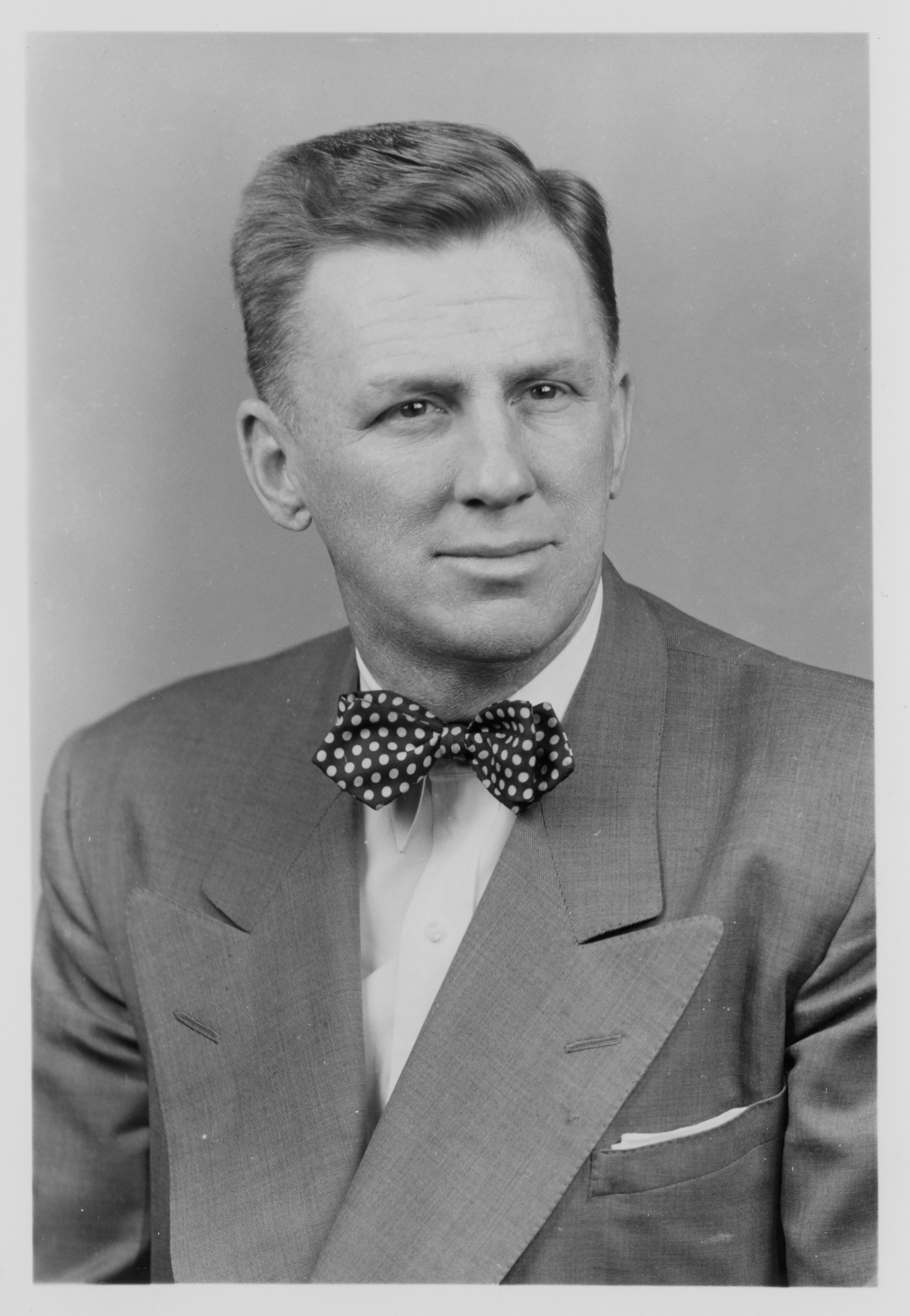

	Majority party	Minority party
Leader	John Davis Larkins Jr. (retired as leader)
Party	Democratic	Republican
Leader since	1941
Leader's seat	7th–Jones Co.
Last election	48	2
Seats won	48	2
- Results by party: Democratic hold Republican hold
President pro tempore before election
John Davis Larkins Jr.
Democratic
Elected President pro tempore
John H. Price
Democratic

An election to the North Carolina Senate was held on November 3, 1942, to elect 40 candidates to the Senate to serve a four-year term. The Democratic Party retained its supermajority in the chamber, winning 48 seats to the Republican Party's two. The election was the first held under the maps drawn at the 1941 reapportionment. The 1943 Legislature met from January 6th to March 10th.

== Redistricting ==
Counties in italics were removed from their original district, and counties in boldface were added to their new district.

District	Pre-1941	1941
1	Camden, Chowan, Currituck, Gates, Hertford, Pasquotank, Perquimans (2 seats)	**Bertie,** Camden, Chowan, Currituck, Gates, Hertford, Pasquotank, Perquimans (2 seats)
2	Beaufort, Dare, Hyde, Martin, Pamlico, Tyrrell, Washington (2 seats)	Beaufort, Dare, Hyde, Martin, Pamlico, Tyrrell, Washington (2 seats)
3	Bertie, Northampton (1 seat)	Northampton, **Vance, Warren** (1 seat)
4	Edgecombe, Halifax (2 seats)	Edgecombe, Halifax (2 seats)
5	Pitt (1 seat)	Pitt (1 seat)
6	Franklin, Nash, Wilson (2 seats)	Franklin, Nash, Wilson (2 seats)
7	Carteret, Craven, Greene, Jones, Lenoir, Onslow (2 seats)	Carteret, Craven, Greene, Jones, Lenoir, Onslow (2 seats)
8	Johnston, Wayne (2 seats)	Johnston, Wayne (2 seats)
9	Duplin, New Hanover, Pender, Sampson (2 seats)	Duplin, New Hanover, Pender, Sampson (2 seats)
10	Bladen, Brunswick, Columbus, Cumberland (2 seats)	Bladen, Brunswick, Columbus, Cumberland (2 seats)
11	Robeson (1 seat)	Robeson (1 seat)
12	Harnett, Hoke, Moore, Randolph (2 seats)	Harnett, Hoke, Moore, Randolph (2 seats)
13	Chatham, Lee, Wake (2 seats)	Chatham, Lee, Wake (2 seats)
14	Vance, Warren (1 seat)	**Durham, Granville, Person (2 seats)**
15	Granville, Person (1 seat)	**Caswell, Rockingham (1 seat)**
16	Alamance, Caswell, Durham, Orange (2 seats)	Alamance, Orange (1 seat)
17	Guilford, Rockingham (2 seats)	Guilford (1 seat)
18	Davidson, Montgomery, Richmond, Scotland (2 seats)	Davidson, Montgomery, Richmond, Scotland (2 seats)
19	Anson, Stanly, Union (2 seats)	Anson, Stanly, Union (2 seats)
20	Cabarrus, Mecklenburg (2 seats)	Mecklenburg (1 seat)
21	Rowan (1 seat)	**Cabarrus,** Rowan (2 seats)
22	Forsyth (1 seat)	Forsyth (1 seat)
23	Stokes, Surry (1 seat)	Stokes, Surry (1 seat)
24	Davie, Wilkes, Yadkin (1 seat)	Davie, Wilkes, Yadkin (1 seat)
25	Catawba, Iredell, Lincoln (2 seats)	Catawba, Iredell, Lincoln (2 seats)
26	Gaston (1 seat)	Gaston (1 seat)
27	Cleveland, Henderson, McDowell, Polk, Rutherford (2 seats)	Cleveland, McDowell, Rutherford (2 seats)
28	Alexander, Burke, Caldwell (1 seat)	Alexander, Burke, Caldwell (1 seat)
29	Alleghany, Ashe, Watauga (1 seat)	Alleghany, Ashe, Watauga (1 seat)
30	Avery, Madison, Mitchell, Yancey (1 seat)	Avery, Madison, Mitchell, Yancey (1 seat)
31	Buncombe (1 seat)	Buncombe (1 seat)
32	Haywood, Jackson, Transylvania (1 seat)	Haywood, **Henderson,** Jackson, **Polk,** Transylvania (2 seats)
33	Cherokee, Clay, Graham, Macon, Swain (1 seat)	Cherokee, Clay, Graham, Macon, Swain (1 seat)

== Summary ==
The following candidates were returned at the general election. Candidates in boldface did not serve in the previous legislature.

- 1st, 2 members (Bertie, Camden, Chowan, Currituck, Gates, Hertford, Pasquotank, Perquimans):
  - Merrill Evans (Democratic)
  - Herbert Ross Leary (Democratic)
- 2nd, 2 members (Beaufort, Dare, Hyde, Martin, Pamlico, Tyrrell, Washington)
  - **E. A. Daniel (Democratic)**
  - Hugh G. Horton (Democratic)
- 3rd (Northampton, Vance, Warren): **Gordon Wallace Poindexter (Democratic)**
- 4th, 2 members (Edgecombe, Halifax):
  - William Grimes Clark (Democratic)
  - **Mac Johnson (Democratic)**
- 5th (Pitt): James Conrad Lanier (Democratic)
- 6th, 2 members (Franklin, Nash, Wilson):
  - **Joseph Colin Eagles (Democratic)**
  - Van Sharpe Watson (Democratic)
- 7th, 2 members (Carteret, Craven, Greene, Jones, Lenoir, Onslow):
  - John Davis Larkins Jr. (Democratic)
  - Kenneth Alexandria Pittman (Democratic)
- 8th, 2 members (Johnston, Wayne):
  - John B. Benton (Democratic)
  - Thomas O'Berry (Democratic)
- 9th, 2 members (Duplin, New Hanover, Pender, Sampson):
  - **Rivers Dunn Johnson (Democratic)**
  - **James Edward Lee Wade (Democratic)**
- 10th, 2 members (Bladen, Brunswick, Columbus, Cumberland):
  - **Joseph Watters Ruark (Democratic)**
  - **Rose Cranse Harrelson (Democratic)**
- 11th (Robeson): **Carson Malloy Barker (Democratic)**
- 12th, 2 members (Harnett, Hoke, Moore, Randolph):
  - **Leonidas Martin Chaffin (Democratic)**
  - **Wilbur Hoke Currie (Democratic)**
- 13th, 2 members (Chatham, Lee, Wake):
  - **Wade Barber (Democratic)**
  - Lynton Yates Ballentine (Democratic)
- 14th, 2 members (Durham, Granville, Person):
  - **Eugene Clyde Brooks Jr. (Democratic)**
  - **John S. Watkins (Democratic)**
- 15th (Caswell, Rockingham): John Hampton Price (Democratic) (redistricted from the 17th district)
- 16th (Alamance, Orange): Emerson Thompson Sanders (Democratic)
- 17th (Guilford): **Daniel Edward Hudgins (Democratic)**
- 18th, 2 members (Davidson, Montgomery, Richmond, Scotland):
  - John Wyatt Cole (Democratic) (redistricted from the 17th district)
  - **Joseph Paul Wallace (Democratic)**
- 19th, 2 members (Anson, Stanly, Union):
  - Coble Funderburk (Democratic)
  - **Hoyt Patrick Taylor (Democratic)**
- 20th (Mecklenburg): Joseph Lee Blythe (Democratic)
- 21st, 2 members (Cabarrus, Rowan):
  - Edwin Clarke Gregory (Democratic)
  - Albert Ballard Palmer (Democratic) (redistricted from the 20th district)
- 22nd (Forsyth): **Irving Edward Carlyle (Democratic)**
- 23rd (Stokes, Surry): **James Raymond Smith (Democratic)**
- 24th (Davie, Wilkes, Yadkin): **Burr Coley Brock (Republican)**
- 25th, 2 members (Catawba, Iredell, Lincoln):
  - **William A. Graham (Democratic)**
  - **Hugh Gordon Mitchell (Democratic)**
- 26th (Gaston): Robert Gregg Cherry (Democratic)
- 27th, 2 members (Cleveland, McDowell, Rutherford):
  - Wade Matheny (Democratic)
  - **Lee B. Weathers (Democratic)**
- 28th (Alexander, Burke, Caldwell): **Max C. Wilson (Democratic)**
- 29th (Alleghany, Ashe, Watauga): **Henry Grady Farthing (Democratic)**
- 30th (Avery, Madison, Mitchell, Yancey): **Charles Lee Brown (Republican)**
- 31st (Buncombe): **Brandon P. Hodges (Democratic)**
- 32nd, 2 members (Haywood, Henderson, Jackson, Polk, Transylvania):
  - **John Thomas Bailey (Democratic)**
  - **Gertrude Dills McKee (Democratic)**
- 33rd (Cherokee, Clay, Graham, Macon, Swain): Edwin Burch Whitaker (Democratic)

== See also ==
- List of North Carolina state legislatures
