= Tony P. Moore =

American politician

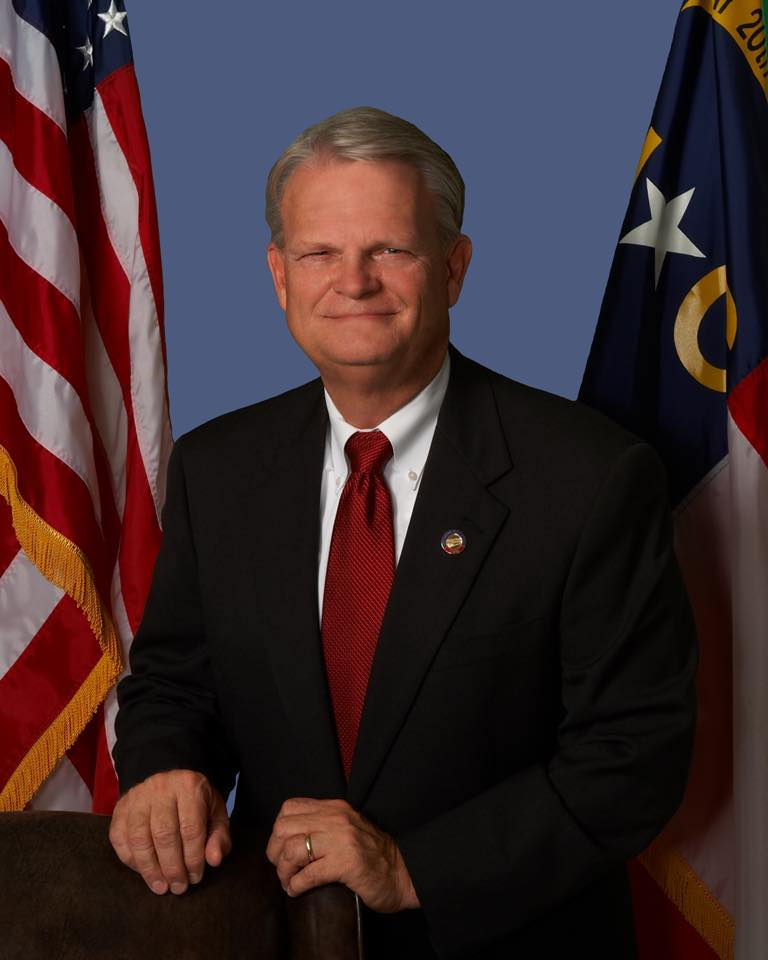

Member of the North Carolina Senate from the 5th district
- In office January 1, 2003 – January 1, 2005
- Preceded by: Constituency Established
- Succeeded by: John Kerr

Personal details
- Party: Republican
- Education: Appalachian State University (BA); East Carolina University (MEd)

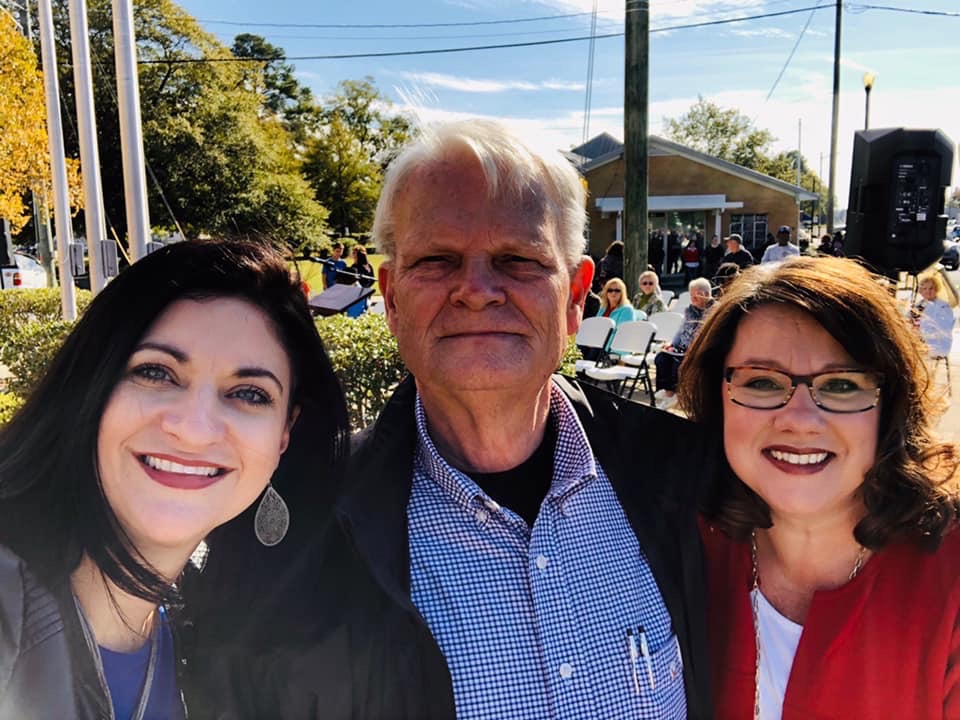
Tony Moore in Winterville

Tony P. Moore is a Republican politician who served one term in the North Carolina General Assembly representing the state's fifth Senate district, including constituents in Pitt and Wilson counties, during the 2003–2004 session.

Tony Moore has worked as a public works administrator for the town of Winterville. He was also a teacher at a Pitt County school. Moore later headed North Carolina Driving School. He graduated from Lenoir Community college in 1971 with an associate graduate degree. He also graduated from Appalachian State University in 1983 with a bachelor's degree and he earned a master's degree in education in 1987 from East Carolina University.

== Background ==
Tony Moore started out as a public works administrator for the town of Winterville. He was also a teacher at Pitt county school. Moore later worked for the North Carolina Driving School.

He graduated from Lenoir Community college in 1971 with an associate graduate degree in 1971. He also graduated from Appalachian State University in 1983 with a bachelor's degree and he earned a master's degree in education in 1987 from East Carolina University in 1987. State Senate elections were redrawn for 2004, such that the district contained less of Pitt County joined with Greene and part of Wayne County putting Moore in the same district as incumbent democratic State Senator John H. Kerr, III of Wayne County. Moore switched parties to Republican and opposed Kerr in the General Election, but lost the seat.

=== State Senate ===
During his tenure Moore supported numerous bills for the community. These included measures to increase funds for osteoporosis awareness and education activities. Other bills sponsored by him included legislation to: provide a tax credit for certain major computer manufacturing facilities, reduce the corporate and personal income tax rates to six percent, limit the length of legislative sessions, prohibit the possession or operation of video gaming machines except by a federally recognized Indian tribe, require that a DNA sample be taken from any person convicted of any felony or certain other criminal offenses, amend the constitution of North Carolina to provide four years terms for members of the General Assembly, and increase the monthly pension for members of the firemen's and rescue squad workers pension found,

Other bills included measures to aurthorize the Division of Motor Vehicles to issue a "Choose Life" Special licence plate, provide reciprocal concealed handgun rights to permit holders of other states, and waive concealed handgun permit fees for qualified former sworn law enforcement officers. etc.

== Awards ==
Moore received numerous awards during his tenure in the North Carolina General Assembly. He received a certificate of dedication from the North Carolina PTA Association.

As a ruritan, Moore won the Tom Dellow award from the Ruritian National Foundation.

== Political career ==
In 2006, Moore (Rep.) challenged State Representative Marian N. McLawhorn (Dem) for her seat in the NC House 9th district, representing part of Pitt County, and lost, receiving only 43% of the vote.

In 2007, Moore switched back to Democrat and was elected as an Alderman in the town of Winterville, North Carolina.

In 2008, Moore was one of several Democrats to run for the seat being vacated by retiring Senator John H. Kerr III. He was unsuccessful in reaching the runoff election between Kathy A. Taft and Don Davis. Davis won the runoff and then defeated Louis M. Pate Jr. for the seat.

In 2009, Moore challenged Douglas A. Jackson, Mayor of Winterville for his seat but was unsuccessful.

== Winterville Town Council ==
As a Winterville Town Council member, Moore was an advocate for the local military of the area leading the annual Veterans Day celebration. He said, "this is the most important day of the year to me, my father was a veteran and without them, we wouldn't be a country, they're very important."

== 2020 Election season ==
Moore (Republican Party) is running for election to the North Carolina House of Representatives to represent District 8. Moore is on the ballot in the Republican primary on March 3, 2020.

North Carolina Senate
Preceded by Charles Albertson	Member of the North Carolina Senate from the 5th district 2003–2005	Succeeded by John Kerr
