= North Carolina's 11th House district =

American legislative district

North Carolina's 11th State House of Representatives district
Representative
Allison Dahle; D–Raleigh
- Demographics: 67% White; 9% Black; 11% Hispanic; 8% Asian; 1% Other; 4% Multiracial
- Population (2024): 84,859

North Carolina's 11th House district is one of 120 districts in the North Carolina House of Representatives. It has been represented by Democrat Allison Dahle since 2019.

== Geography ==
Since 2013, the district has included part of Wake County. The district overlaps with the 13th, 16th, and 17th Senate districts.

== District officeholders ==
=== Single-member district ===
Representative	Party	Dates	Notes	Counties
Hugh Johnson Jr. (Rose Hill)	Democratic	January 1, 1967 – January 1, 1971	Redistricted from the Duplin County district.	1967–1973; All of Duplin County.
T. J. Baker (Wallace)	Democratic	January 1, 1971 – January 1, 1973	Redistricted to the 10th district.	1967–1973; All of Duplin County.
Tommy Harrelson (Southport)	Republican	January 1, 1973 – January 1, 1975	Redistricted from the 13th district.	1973–1983; All of Brunswick and Pender counties.
Allen Ward (Shallotte)	Democratic	January 1, 1975 – January 1, 1979		1973–1983; All of Brunswick and Pender counties.
Tom Rabon Jr. (Winnabow)	Democratic	January 1, 1979 – January 1, 1983	Redistricted to the 14th district.	1973–1983; All of Brunswick and Pender counties.

=== Multi-member district ===
Representative	Party	Dates	Notes	Representative	Party	Dates	Notes	Counties
Martin Lancaster (Goldsboro)	Democratic	January 1, 1983 – January 1, 1987	Redistricted from the 9th district. Retired to run for Congress.	Charles Woodard (Goldsboro)	Democratic	January 1, 1983 – January 1, 1987	Retired.	1983–1993; All of Wayne County.
John Kerr III (Goldsboro)	Democratic	January 1, 1987 – January 1, 1993	Retired to run for State Senate.	John Tart (Goldsboro)	Democratic	January 1, 1987 – January 1, 1991	Lost re-election.	1983–1993; All of Wayne County.
John Kerr III (Goldsboro)	Democratic	January 1, 1987 – January 1, 1993	Retired to run for State Senate.	Carolyn Russell (Goldsboro)	Republican	January 1, 1991 – January 1, 1993	Redistricted to the 77th district.	1983–1993; All of Wayne County.

=== Single-member district ===
Representative	Party	Dates	Notes	Counties
Phil Baddour (Goldsboro)	Democratic	January 1, 1993 – January 1, 1995	Lost re-election.	1993–2003; Parts of Wayne and Lenoir counties.
Louis Pate (Mount Olive)	Republican	January 1, 1995 – January 1, 1997	Lost re-election.	1993–2003; Parts of Wayne and Lenoir counties.
Phil Baddour (Goldsboro)	Democratic	January 1, 1997 – January 1, 2003	Lost re-election.	1993–2003; Parts of Wayne and Lenoir counties.
Louis Pate (Mount Olive)	Republican	January 1, 2003 – January 1, 2009	Retired to run for State Senate.	2003–2013; Part of Wayne County.
Efton Sager (Goldsboro)	Republican	January 1, 2009 – January 1, 2013	Redistricted to the 4th district and lost re-nomination.	2003–2013; Part of Wayne County.
Duane Hall (Raleigh)	Democratic	January 1, 2013 – January 1, 2019	Lost re-nomination.	2013–Present; Part of Wake County.
Allison Dahle (Raleigh)	Democratic	January 1, 2019 – Present		2013–Present; Part of Wake County.

== Election results ==
=== 2024 ===
North Carolina House of Representatives 11th district general election, 2024
Party	Candidate	Votes	%
Democratic	Allison Dahle (incumbent)	31,688	64.65%
Republican	Philip Hensley	15,910	32.46%
Libertarian	Matthew Kordon	1,416	2.89%
Total votes		49,014	100%
Democratic hold			

=== 2022 ===
North Carolina House of Representatives 11th district general election, 2022
Party	Candidate	Votes	%
Democratic	Allison Dahle (incumbent)	20,946	100%
Total votes		20,946	100%
Democratic hold			

=== 2020 ===
North Carolina House of Representatives 11th district general election, 2020
Party	Candidate	Votes	%
Democratic	Allison Dahle (incumbent)	26,798	68.44%
Republican	Clark Pope	10,175	25.98%
Libertarian	Adrian Lee Travers	2,185	5.58%
Total votes		39,158	100%
Democratic hold			

=== 2018 ===
North Carolina House of Representatives 11th district Democratic primary election, 2018
Party	Candidate	Votes	%
Democratic	Allison Dahle	4,517	68.53%
Democratic	Duane Hall (incumbent)	1,746	26.49%
Democratic	Heather Metour	328	4.98%
Total votes		6,591	100%

North Carolina House of Representatives 11th district general election, 2018
Party	Candidate	Votes	%
Democratic	Allison Dahle	23,266	69.22%
Republican	Tyler Brooks	9,179	27.31%
Libertarian	Travis Groo	1,166	3.47%
Total votes		33,611	100%
Democratic hold			

=== 2016 ===
North Carolina House of Representatives 11th district general election, 2016
Party	Candidate	Votes	%
Democratic	Duane Hall (incumbent)	24,624	60.88%
Republican	Ray Martin	12,924	31.95%
Libertarian	Brian Lewis	2,897	7.16%
Total votes		40,445	100%
Democratic hold			

=== 2014 ===
North Carolina House of Representatives 11th district general election, 2014
Party	Candidate	Votes	%
Democratic	Duane Hall (incumbent)	14,799	61.49%
Republican	Ray Martin	9,268	38.51%
Total votes		24,067	100%
Democratic hold			

=== 2012 ===
North Carolina House of Representatives 11th district general election, 2012
Party	Candidate	Votes	%
Democratic	Duane Hall	27,247	100%
Total votes		27,247	100%
Democratic hold			

=== 2010 ===
North Carolina House of Representatives 11th district general election, 2010
Party	Candidate	Votes	%
Republican	Efton Sager (incumbent)	15,409	100%
Total votes		15,409	100%
Republican hold			

=== 2008 ===
North Carolina House of Representatives 11th district general election, 2008
Party	Candidate	Votes	%
Republican	Efton Sager	18,487	57.95%
Democratic	Ronnie Griffin	13,412	42.05%
Total votes		31,899	100%
Republican hold			

=== 2006 ===
North Carolina House of Representatives 11th district general election, 2006
Party	Candidate	Votes	%
Republican	Louis Pate (incumbent)	9,016	65.50%
Democratic	Ronnie Griffin	4,749	34.50%
Total votes		13,765	100%
Republican hold			

=== 2004 ===
North Carolina House of Representatives 11th district general election, 2004
Party	Candidate	Votes	%
Republican	Louis Pate (incumbent)	20,120	100%
Total votes		20,120	100%
Republican hold			

=== 2002 ===
North Carolina House of Representatives 11th district Republican primary election, 2002
Party	Candidate	Votes	%
Republican	Louis Pate	1,266	55.28%
Republican	Willie Ray Starling	1,024	44.72%
Total votes		2,290	100%

North Carolina House of Representatives 11th district general election, 2002
Party	Candidate	Votes	%
Republican	Louis Pate	8,508	50.52%
Democratic	Phil Baddour (incumbent)	8,334	49.48%
Total votes		16,842	100%
Republican gain from Democratic			

=== 2000 ===
North Carolina House of Representatives 11th district general election, 2000
Party	Candidate	Votes	%
Democratic	Phil Baddour (incumbent)	11,834	59.67%
Republican	Willie Ray Starling	7,774	39.20%
Libertarian	Mike Todaro	226	1.14%
Total votes		19,834	100%
Democratic hold			
