= Senator Kerr =

Senator Kerr may refer to:

== Members of the United States Senate ==
- Joseph Kerr (1765–1837), U.S. Senator from Ohio from 1814 to 1815
- Robert S. Kerr (1896–1963), U.S. Senator from Oklahoma from 1949 to 1963

== United States state senate members ==
- Alice Forgy Kerr (born 1954), Kentucky State Senate
- Andy Kerr (American politician) (born 1968), Colorado State Senate
- David Kerr (Kansas politician) (born 1945), Kansas State Senate
- Fred Kerr (born 1940), Kansas State Senate
- James Kerr (Pennsylvania politician) (1851–1908), Pennsylvania State Senate
- James Kerr (Texas politician) (1790–1850), Missouri State Senate
- John H. Kerr III (1936–2015), North Carolina State Senate
- John H. Kerr Jr. (1900–1968), North Carolina State Senate
- John Leeds Kerr (1780–1844), Maryland State Senate
- Lucien H. Kerr (1831–1873), Illinois State Senate
- Robert M. Kerr (1932–2006), Oklahoma State Senate
- Sine Kerr (born 1959/60), Arizona State Senate
- Winfield S. Kerr (1852–1917), Ohio State Senate

== See also ==
- Emma Kerr-Carpenter (fl. 2010s–present), Montana State Senate
