= Senator Pate =

Senator Pate may refer to:

- Louis M. Pate Jr. (born 1936), North Carolina State Senate
- Paul Pate (born 1958), Iowa State Senate
