= Baddour =

Baddour is a surname of Lebanese Christian origin. Notable people with the surname include:

- Anne Baddour (fl. 1988), American aviator
- Phil Baddour (born 1942), American politician
- Steven Baddour (born 1969), American attorney and politician
