= Efton Sager =

American politician

Representative Efton Sager

Member of the North Carolina House of Representatives from the 11th district
- In office January 1, 2009 – January 1, 2013
- Preceded by: Louis Pate
- Succeeded by: Jimmy Dixon (Redistricting)

Member of the Southern Wayne Sanitary District Board
- In office 2015–2019
- Succeeded by: Matthew McLamb

Member of the Wayne County Board of Commissioners
- In office 2000–2008

Personal details
- Party: Republican
- Spouse: Deloris Parsons (died 2021)
- Children: 2
- Education: Wayne Community College
- Occupation: Salesman, Manager

Efton M. Sager is a former Republican member of the North Carolina House of Representatives who represented the 11th district (including part of Wayne County) from 2009 to 2013. Sager previously served on the Wayne County Board of Commissioners from 2000 to 2008.

== Electoral history ==
=== 2019 ===
Southern Wayne Sanitary District Board Member general election, 2015
Candidate	Votes	%
Thomas Gainey	181	23.18%
Scott T. Ingram	176	22.54%
Efton Sager	167	21.38%
Matthew McLamb	158	20.23%
Walter (Buz) St. Cyre	93	11.91%
Write-in	6	0.77%
Total votes	781	100%

=== 2015 ===
Southern Wayne Sanitary District Board Member general election, 2015
Candidate	Votes	%
Kevin Jones	101	25.90%
Efton Sager	91	23.33%
Marty Shaw	91	23.33%
Scott T. Ingram	90	23.08%
Jesse Jernigan	17	4.36%
Total votes	390	100%

=== 2012 ===
North Carolina House of Representatives 4th district Republican Primary election, 2012
Party	Candidate	Votes	%
Republican	Jimmy Dixon (incumbent)	4,873	62.30%
Republican	Efton Sager (incumbent)	2,949	37.70%
Total votes		7,822	100%

=== 2010 ===
North Carolina House of Representatives 11th district general election, 2010
Party	Candidate	Votes	%
Republican	Efton Sager (incumbent)	15,409	100%
Total votes		15,409	100%
Republican hold			

=== 2008 ===
North Carolina House of Representatives 11th district general election, 2008
Party	Candidate	Votes	%
Republican	Efton Sager	18,487	57.95%
Democratic	Ronnie Griffin	13,412	42.05%
Total votes		31,899	100%
Republican hold			

== Committee assignments ==
=== 2011-2012 session ===
- Agriculture (Chair)
- Appropriations
- Appropriations - Natural and Economic Resources (Vice Chair)
- Commerce and Job Development
- Commerce - Business and Labor
- Education
- Elections
- Homeland Security, Military, and Veterans Affairs

=== 2009-2010 session ===
- Appropriations
- Appropriations - Natural and Economic Resources
- Aging
- Election Law and Campaign Finance Reform
- Energy and Energy Efficiency
- Homeland Security, Military, and Veterans Affairs
- State Government/State Personnel

North Carolina House of Representatives
Preceded by Louis Pate	Member of the North Carolina House of Representatives from the 11th District; 2009-2013	Succeeded by Duane Hall
