= Duane Hall =

American politician

Duane R. Hall II
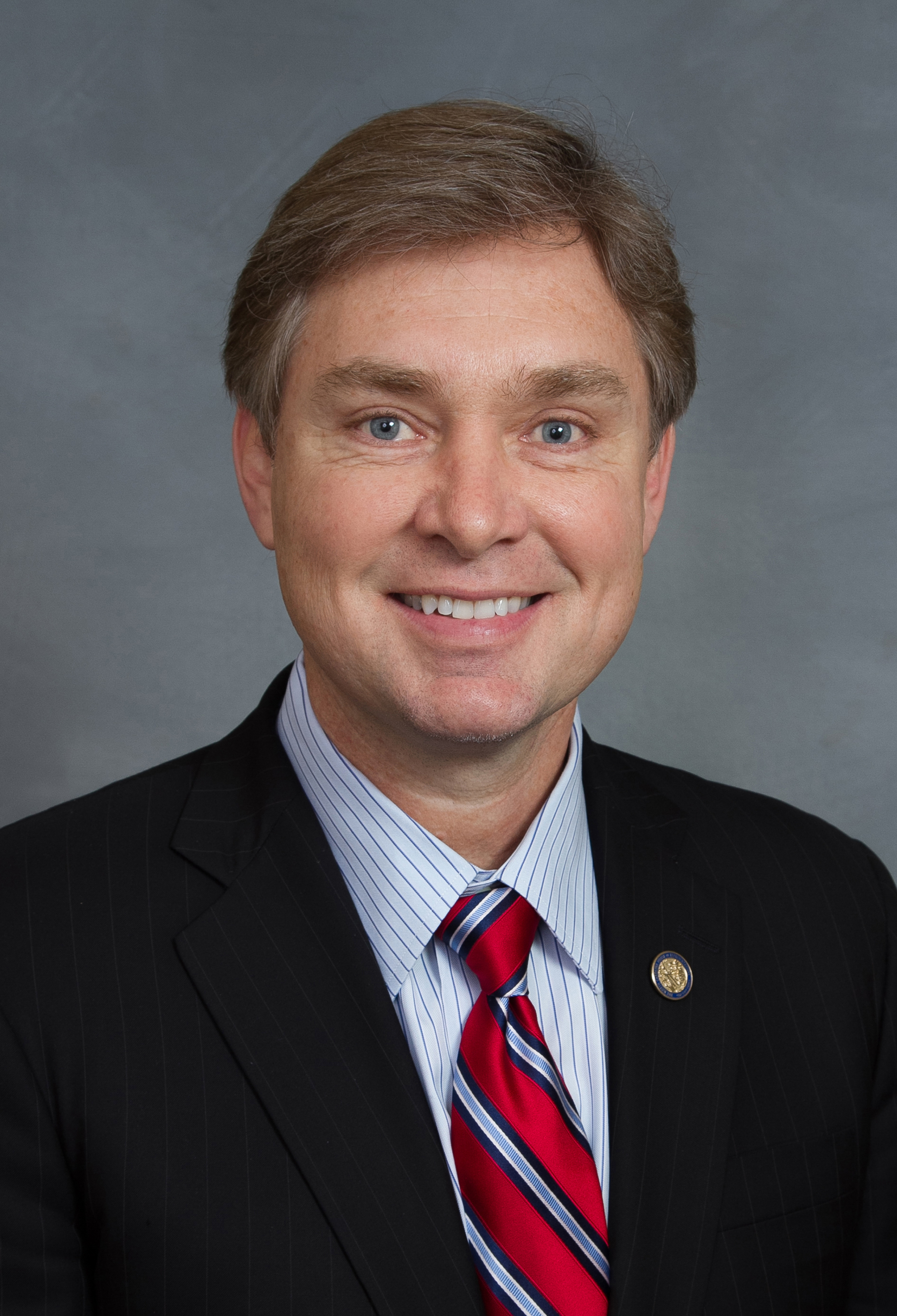

Member of the North Carolina House of Representatives from the 11th district
- In office January 1, 2013 – January 1, 2019
- Preceded by: Jennifer Weiss (Redistricting)
- Succeeded by: Allison Dahle

Personal details
- Born: Duane Raymond Hall, II; February 6, 1967 (age 59) High Point, North Carolina, U.S.
- Party: Democratic
- Education: North Carolina State University (BA); Florida State University (JD)
- Profession: Attorney

Duane Raymond Hall, II (born February 6, 1967) is an American attorney and politician. Elected to the North Carolina House of Representatives 11th district in 2012, Representative Hall was chosen by his colleagues to serve as Freshman Leader. Re-elected in 2014, Rep. Hall was ranked as one of the most effective Democratic members of the North Carolina General Assembly's 2015-2017 session.

In 2018 North Carolina Governor Roy Cooper appointed Representative Hall to serve as Chairman of the North Carolina Courts Commission. In his final term, ending in 2019, Representative Hall was the primary sponsor of more successful legislation than any other Democratic member of the House, including the landmark Raise the Age bill, which raised the age of juvenile jurisdiction.

In 2013, Hall sponsored a successful bill that encouraged mediation between landlords and homeowners associations. He has been a major critic of a 2013 North Carolina voter I.D. law that was passed following Shelby County v. Holder.

In 2016, Hall purchased the Bailey-Tucker House, the former state guest house in the Blount Street Historic District, for $900,000 to use as a law office.

Hall ran for a fourth term in 2018 but faced calls to resign after he was accused by several women of sexual harassment. He lost the Democratic primary in a landslide to first-time candidate Allison Dahle who went on to win the general election.

Hall is currently in private law practice in Raleigh, North Carolina, specializing in Real Estate law, eminent domain and personal injury.

North Carolina House of Representatives
Preceded by Efton Sager	Member of the North Carolina House of Representatives from the 11th district 2013-2019	Succeeded by Allison Dahle
