= Allison Dahle =

American politician

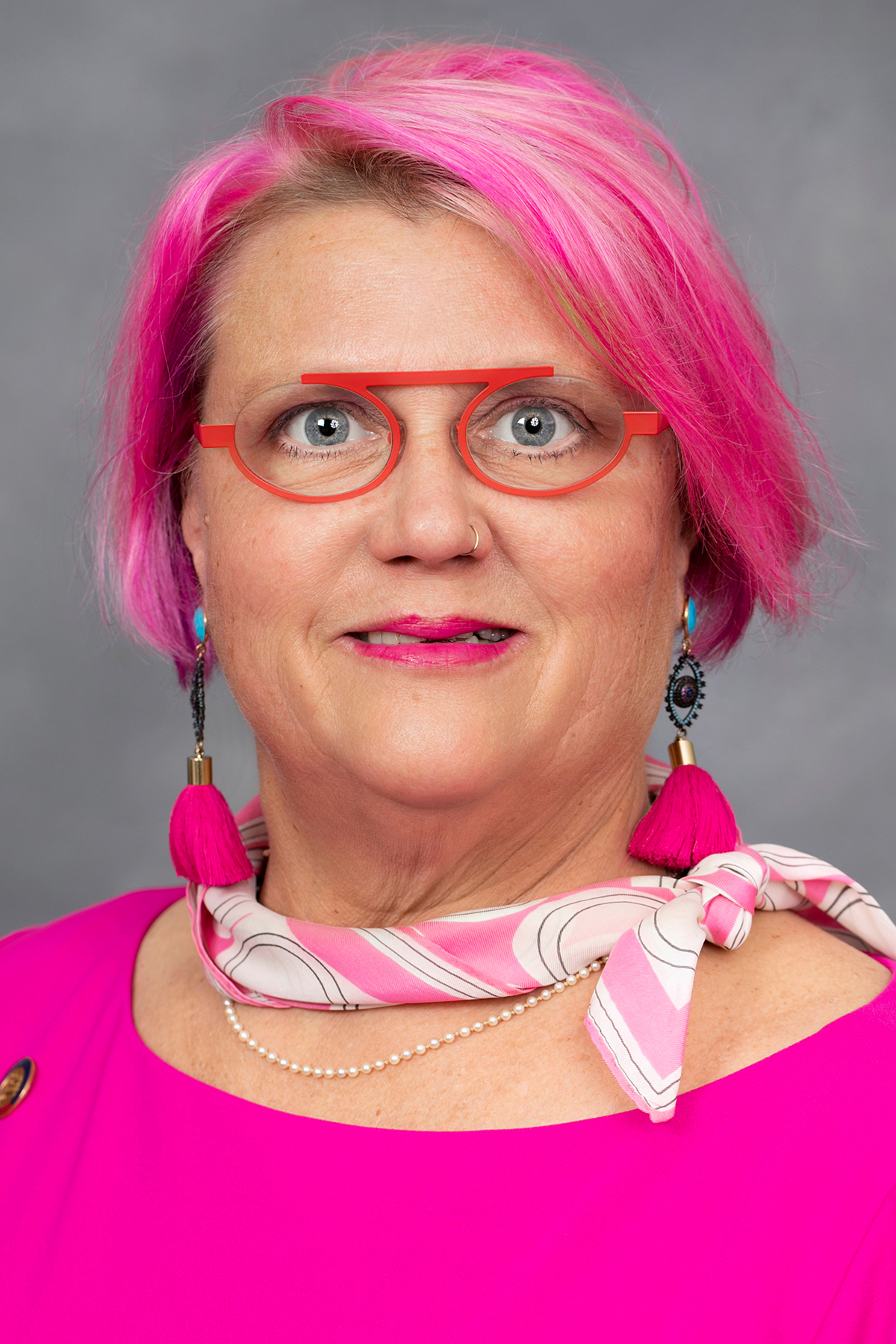

Member of the North Carolina House of Representatives from the 11th district
- Incumbent
- Assumed office January 1, 2019
- Preceded by: Duane Hall

Personal details
- Born: March 25, 1964 (age 62) Raleigh, North Carolina, U.S.
- Party: Democratic
- Spouse: Lou
- Education: Peace College (AA); University of South Carolina (BA)

Allison Anne Dahle (born March 25, 1964) is an American politician. A member of the Democratic Party, she is a member of the North Carolina House of Representatives. Dahle has represented the 11th district (including parts of Wake County) since 2019.

== Personal life ==
Dahle was born at Rex Hospital in Raleigh, North Carolina. Her mother, Anne Clark Dahle, was a longtime educator at Meredith College, and her father, Dr. Robert Dahle, was an agricultural economist at North Carolina State University. She attended Needham B. Broughton High School and graduated from the University of South Carolina with a degree in Theatre and Speech.

After her graduation, she worked as a stage manager on Broadway, and later for the Young Adult Institute in Brooklyn. Later, she worked for the Arc of North Carolina.

Dahle is a lesbian, making her one of five openly LGBTQ officeholders in the North Carolina state legislature as of 2025, alongside Vernetta Alston, Deb Butler, Lisa Grafstein, and Marcia Morey.

== Political career ==
After defeating incumbent Duane Hall in the Democratic primary, Dahle was elected to the North Carolina House of Representatives on November 6, 2018. She secured sixty-nine percent of the vote while her closest rival Republican Brennan Brooks secured twenty-seven percent. Dahle was re-elected in 2020, 2022, and 2024.

== Electoral history ==
=== 2024 ===
North Carolina House of Representatives 11th district general election, 2024
Party	Candidate	Votes	%
Democratic	Allison Dahle (incumbent)	31,688	64.65%
Republican	Philip Hensley	15,910	32.46%
Libertarian	Matthew Kordon	1,416	2.89%
Total votes		49,014	100%
Democratic hold			

=== 2022 ===
North Carolina House of Representatives 11th district general election, 2022
Party	Candidate	Votes	%
Democratic	Allison Dahle (incumbent)	20,946	100%
Total votes		20,946	100%
Democratic hold			

=== 2020 ===
North Carolina House of Representatives 11th district general election, 2020
Party	Candidate	Votes	%
Democratic	Allison Dahle (incumbent)	26,798	68.44%
Republican	Clark Pope	10,175	25.98%
Libertarian	Adrian Lee Travers	2,185	5.58%
Total votes		39,158	100%
Democratic hold			

=== 2018 ===
North Carolina House of Representatives 11th district Democratic primary election, 2018
Party	Candidate	Votes	%
Democratic	Allison Dahle	4,517	68.53%
Democratic	Duane Hall (incumbent)	1,746	26.49%
Democratic	Heather Metour	328	4.98%
Total votes		6,591	100%

North Carolina House of Representatives 11th district general election, 2018
Party	Candidate	Votes	%
Democratic	Allison Dahle	23,266	69.22%
Republican	Tyler Brooks	9,179	27.31%
Libertarian	Travis Groo	1,166	3.47%
Total votes		33,611	100%
Democratic hold			

== Committee assignments ==
=== 2025-2026 session ===
- Alcoholic Beverage Control
- Appropriations
- Appropriations, Agriculture and Natural and Economic Resources
- Election Law (Vice Chair)
- Ethics
- House Select Committee on Blockchain and Digital Assets
- House Select Committee on Government Efficiency
- House Select Committee on Helene Recovery
- House Select Committee on Oversight and Reform
- Housing and Development
- Oversight
- Regulatory Reform
- Rules, Calendar, and Operations of the House

=== 2023-2024 session ===
- Alcoholic Beverage Control Committee
- Appropriations Committee
- Appropriations on Agriculture and Natural and Economic Resources Committee
- Election Law and Campaign Finance Reform (Vice Chair)
- Ethics Committee
- Local Government - Land Use, Planning, and Development Committee
- Regulatory Reform Committee
- Rules, Calendar, and Operations of the House Committee

=== 2021-2022 session ===
- Appropriations
- Appropriations - General Government
- Alcoholic Beverage Control
- Election Law and Campaign Finance Reform (Vice Chair)
- Ethics
- Local Government - Land Use, Planning and Development

=== 2019-2020 session ===
- Appropriations
- Appropriations - Agriculture and Natural and Economic Resources
- Alcoholic Beverage Control
- Election Law and Campaign Finance Reform
- Homelessness, Foster Care, and Dependency

North Carolina House of Representatives
Preceded by Duane Hall	Member of the North Carolina House of Representatives from the 11th district 2019-present	Incumbent
