= Don Davis (North Carolina politician) =

American politician (born 1971)

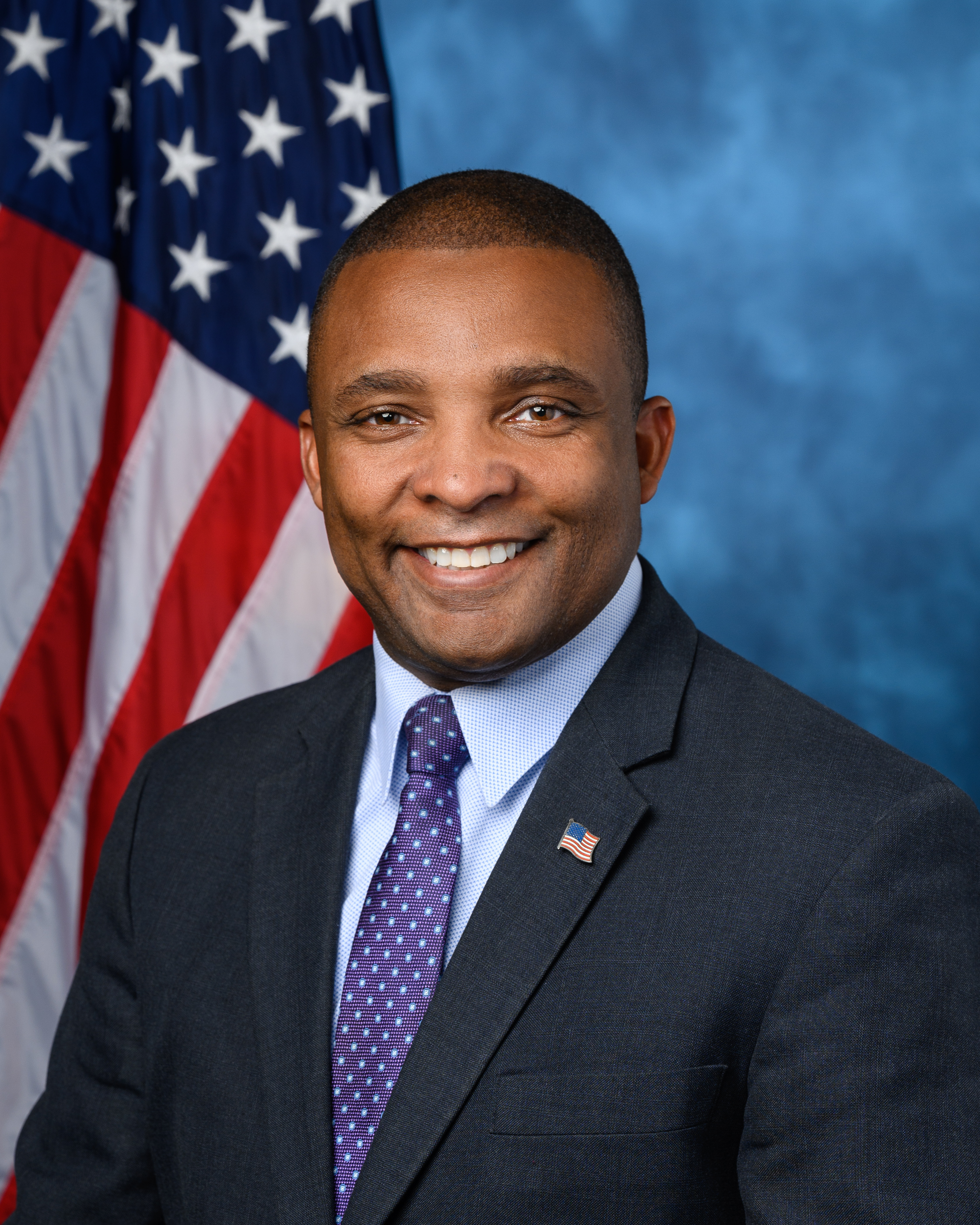
- Official portrait, 2022

Member of the U.S. House of Representatives from North Carolina's 1st district
- Incumbent
- Assumed office January 3, 2023
- Preceded by: G. K. Butterfield

Member of the North Carolina Senate from the 5th district
- In office January 1, 2013 – January 1, 2023
- Preceded by: Louis Pate
- Succeeded by: Kandie Smith
- In office January 1, 2009 – January 1, 2011
- Preceded by: John Kerr
- Succeeded by: Louis Pate

Mayor of Snow Hill
- In office December 10, 2001 – December 10, 2008
- Preceded by: James Bizzell
- Succeeded by: Dennis Liles

Personal details
- Born: Donald Gene Davis; August 29, 1971 (age 55) Snow Hill, North Carolina, U.S.
- Party: Democratic
- Spouse: Yuvonka Davis
- Children: 3
- Education: United States Air Force Academy (BS); Central Michigan University (MS); East Carolina University (MA, EdD)
- Website: House website Campaign website

Military service
- Branch/service: United States Air Force
- Years of service: 1994–2001
- Rank: Captain
- Unit: Joint Base Andrews

Donald Gene Davis (born August 29, 1971) is an American politician and former Air Force officer serving as the United States representative for North Carolina's 1st congressional district since 2023. A member of the Democratic Party, he previously served in the North Carolina Senate, representing the 5th district from 2009 to 2011 and again from 2013 to 2023.

Born in Snow Hill, North Carolina, Davis graduated from the United States Air Force Academy and served eight years in the Air Force, reaching the rank of captain. He returned to North Carolina to teach at East Carolina University and later entered local politics, winning election as mayor of Snow Hill.

He was elected to the U.S. House in 2022 following the retirement of G. K. Butterfield. Davis has been described as a moderate Democrat.

== Early life and education ==
Davis was born in Snow Hill, North Carolina, and was raised in part by his grandmother, Edna Dixon, who worked for the Greene and Wayne county school systems. He later lived in Irving, Texas, where he attended MacArthur High School.

After high school, he attended the United States Air Force Academy, where he earned a Bachelor of Science degree in 1994. Following graduation, he was commissioned into the United States Air Force, serving for eight years and rising to the rank of captain. He worked as a coordinator of Air Force One operations at Joint Base Andrews.

While in the military, he received a Master of Science degree from Central Michigan University. He then returned to North Carolina, where he taught sociology and earned a Master of Arts degree from East Carolina University, as well as a Doctor of Education.

== Early career ==
Davis began his teaching career as an assistant professor of aerospace studies at the Air Force ROTC department at East Carolina University starting in 1998. He taught courses in military history, leadership, and national affairs. He was discharged from the Air Force in 2001.

Following his military service, Davis entered politics, motivated in part by a damaged section of road from his childhood that remained unrepaired when he returned to his hometown of Snow Hill. In 2001, he was elected mayor of the town and oversaw the repaving of ninety percent of its roads.

During this period, he also served as the chair of the Democratic Party for North Carolina's 1st congressional district. In 2004, he briefly ran for the U.S. House of Representatives in the 1st district but withdrew before the primary. He was reelected as mayor in 2005.

== North Carolina Senate ==
=== First term (2008–2010) ===
In 2007, Davis announced his candidacy for the North Carolina's 5th Senate district seat. He was one of six Democratic candidates to compete for the position, which was being vacated by retiring senator John Kerr III. In the May 2008 primary election, Davis received 36% of the vote, the highest among the candidates. However, since he did not secure the 40% required to win outright, he advanced to a runoff against Kathy Taft.

In June 2008, Davis won the Democratic nomination with 63% of the vote in the runoff. He went on to face North Carolina representative Louis Pate, a Republican from Wayne County, in the general election. Davis defeated Pate, winning 53% of the vote in November 2008. His term as senator for District 5, representing Pitt, Wayne, and Greene counties, began on January 1, 2009. However, in 2010, Davis was defeated by Pate in a rematch of the 2008 election.

=== Later terms (2012–2023) ===
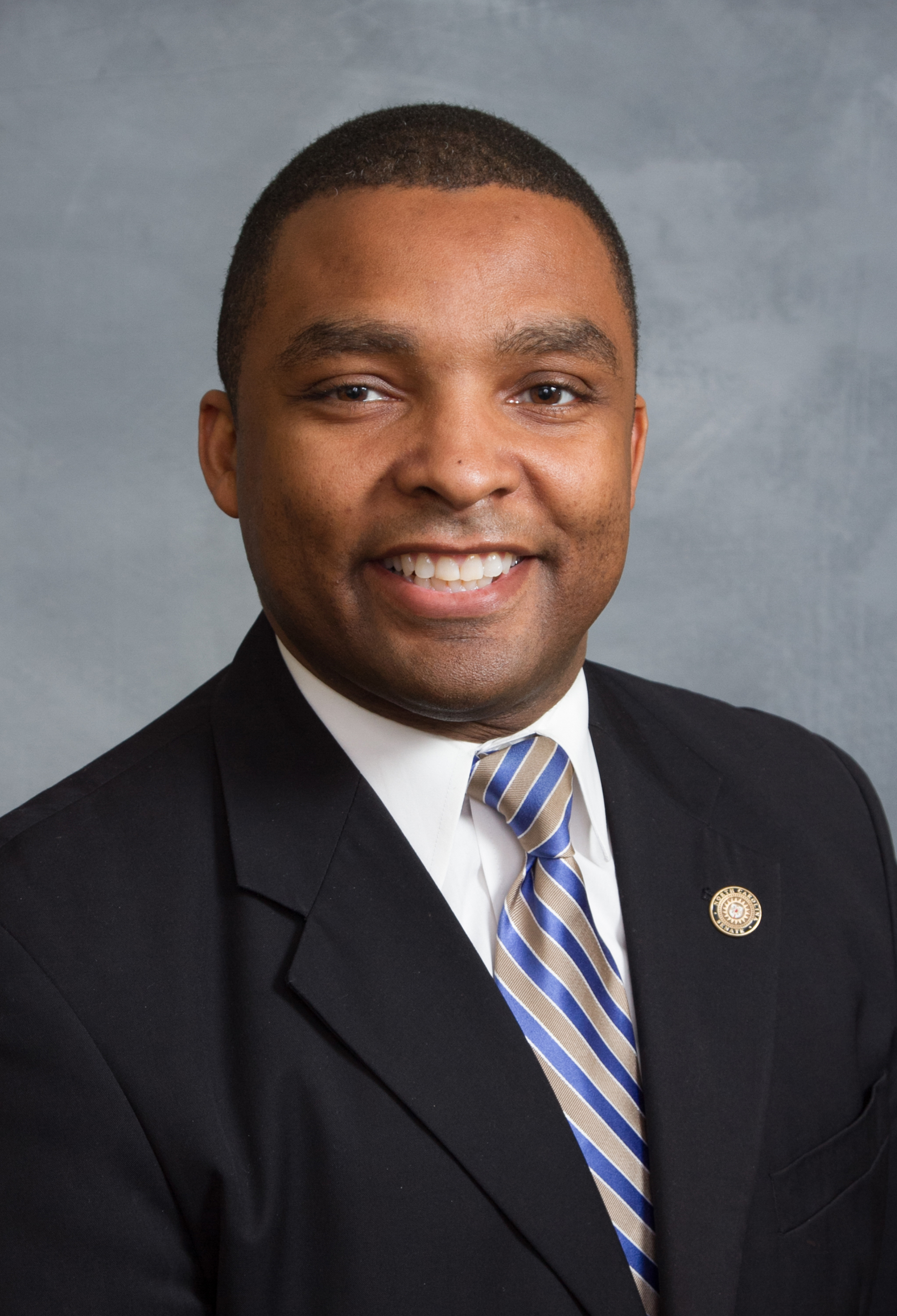
Davis during his tenure as a North Carolina State Senator, 2013

After his defeat in 2010, Davis ran and won a Senate seat for the newly redrawn 5th district in the 2012 election. Davis ran unopposed in 2016 and defeated Pitt County district attorney Kimberly Robb in the 2018 election. He was re-elected in 2020, defeating Republican Karen Kozel.

While in the state senate, Davis was known as a moderate Democrat. He introduced a bill to fund East Carolina University's Brody School of Medicine. He sponsored a bill in 2021 to provide $215 million for the project, which was ultimately included in the state budget signed into law later that year. He also supported legislation related to broadband expansion in rural communities and raising the age of juvenile jurisdiction for nonviolent crimes to 18.

=== Committee assignments ===
While in the North Carolina Senate, Davis served on the committees on Agriculture, Energy, and Environment, Appropriations on Education, Health Care, Redistricting and Elections, and Rules and Operations of the Senate. He also served on the Select Committee on Nominations and the Select Committee on Storm Related River Debris and Damage in the state.

== U.S. House of Representatives ==
=== Elections ===
==== 2022 ====
North Carolina's 1st congressional district 2022 election results by county

In December 2021, Davis announced his candidacy for the U.S. House seat in North Carolina's 1st congressional district following the retirement of Democratic incumbent G. K. Butterfield. Davis won the Democratic nomination in the May 2022 primary for the district, defeating former state senator Erica D. Smith and other candidates.

In the November general election, Davis faced Republican nominee Sandy Smith in the race for the district in the northeastern part of the state. Represented by G. K. Butterfield since 2004, the district became more competitive in 2022 after a court-ordered map replaced partisan lines drawn by the Republican-led General Assembly. Davis won the election with 52.27 percent of the vote to Smith's 47.73 percent, maintaining Democratic control of the district.

==== 2024 ====
Davis ran for reelection in 2024 under congressional boundaries enacted by the Republican-controlled General Assembly in 2023, which replaced the court-ordered map used in 2022. The revised map made the 1st congressional district the state's only competitive district, despite its long history of electing Democrats and not having elected a Republican since 1883. He defeated Republican nominee Laurie Buckhout by 1.5 percentage points.

==== 2026 ====
In 2026 Don Davis ran for a third term, yet again under new congressional boundaries enacted in the fall of 2025 by the General Assembly. The shifting of the boundary between the 1st and 3rd districts was the only change made to the map, making the 1st congressional district more Republican-leaning as part of the larger nation-wide redistricting effort. The election was a rematch between Davis and 2024 Republican nominee Laurie Buckhout and ended with Don Davis winning reelection.

=== Tenure ===
==== First term (2023–2025) ====
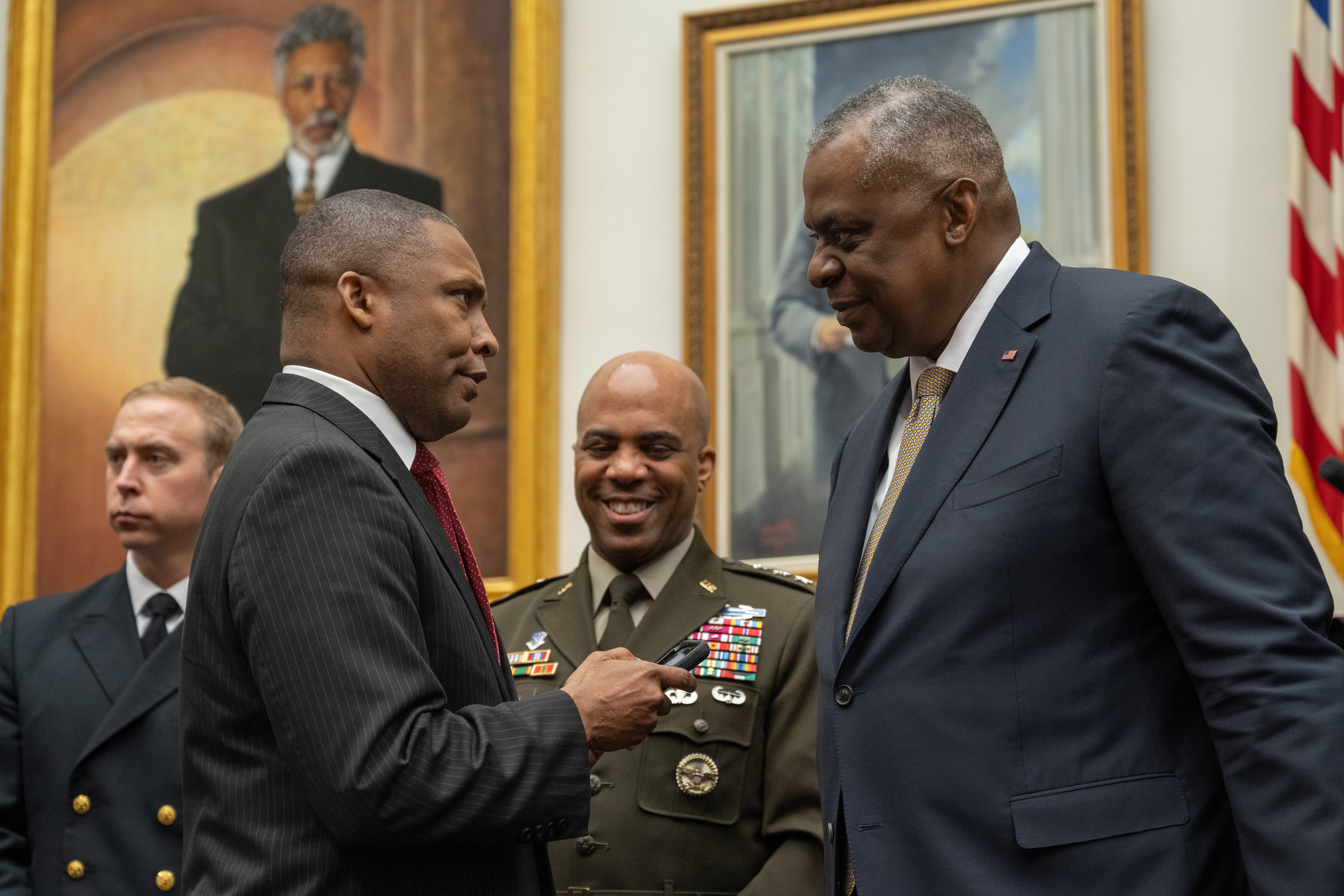
Davis talking with Secretary of Defense Lloyd Austin, 2023

Davis was sworn into the 118th Congress on January 7, 2023, as the U.S. representative for North Carolina's 1st congressional district. During his first term, he was appointed to the Armed Services and Agriculture committees, representing a largely rural district in northeastern North Carolina with many farmers and military veterans.

In August 2023, he introduced with Republican Representative Marcus Molinaro, the bipartisan Flooding Prevention, Assessment, and Restoration Act to improve rural access to federal flood mitigation programs and the related costs. Later in the year, Davis voted to provide Israel with support following the October 7 attacks, and joined other House Democrats in censuring Representative Rashida Tlaib for her comments on the Gaza war. The following year, he co-authored an opinion piece with Republican Representative August Pfluger, and a reporter, which criticized the push by some members of Congress to condition U.S. aid to Israel.

In 2024, Davis invited 109-year-old Cassie Smith from Battleboro to attend the State of the Union address. The following month, he was the sole Democratic co-sponsor of a Republican-led bill by representatives Greg Murphy and Brett Guthrie that would limit Medicare's ability to negotiate drug prices. At the end of the year, he voted for the 2025 National Defense Authorization Act, which authorized $895 billion in military spending and included provisions which he pushed for that prevented the elimination of 520 jobs at the Seymour Johnson Air Force Base in his district and delayed retirement of its F-15E aircraft.

==== Second term (2025–present) ====
During the 119th Congress in his second term, Davis introduced the Frontline Fighter Force First Act in 2025, a bill to modernize aircraft at Seymour Johnson Air Force Base and prioritize investment in next-generation fighter jets to support national defense. Later that year, he joined Republicans in voting for legislation to ban gender-affirming care for transgender minors and criminalize those who assist them in obtaining it. The following year, he voted with the Republican majority for a funding bill for the Department of Homeland Security that included funding for U.S. Immigration and Customs Enforcement.

In 2026, Davis was one of eight Democrats to join House Republicans in passing the Stopping Indoctrination and Protecting Kids Act, which would require that elementary and middle schools obtain parental permission before changing a student's gender identification on school forms and would bar schools from teaching about transgender related topics. He was also one of 10 House Democrats to sign onto a pro-capitalist, anti-socialist initiative, Promise to America, shortly after three candidates backed by the Democratic Socialists of America won in Democratic congressional primaries.

In June 2026, Davis sought $175 million in federal funding for rural healthcare following the closure of Martin General Hospital in Williamston. Later that month, the House Armed Services Committee approved 29 provisions sponsored by Davis for inclusion in the fiscal year 2027 National Defense Authorization Act, including measures supporting military readiness and operations at Seymour Johnson Air Force Base and Marine Corps Air Station Cherry Point.

In September 2026, he voted for a resolution, which denounced socialism and the Democratic Socialists of America, and called for the passage of the SAVE America Act. That month Davis was also the only Democrat that voted for a constitutional amendment to permanently set the number of justices on the Supreme Court at 9.

=== Committee assignments ===
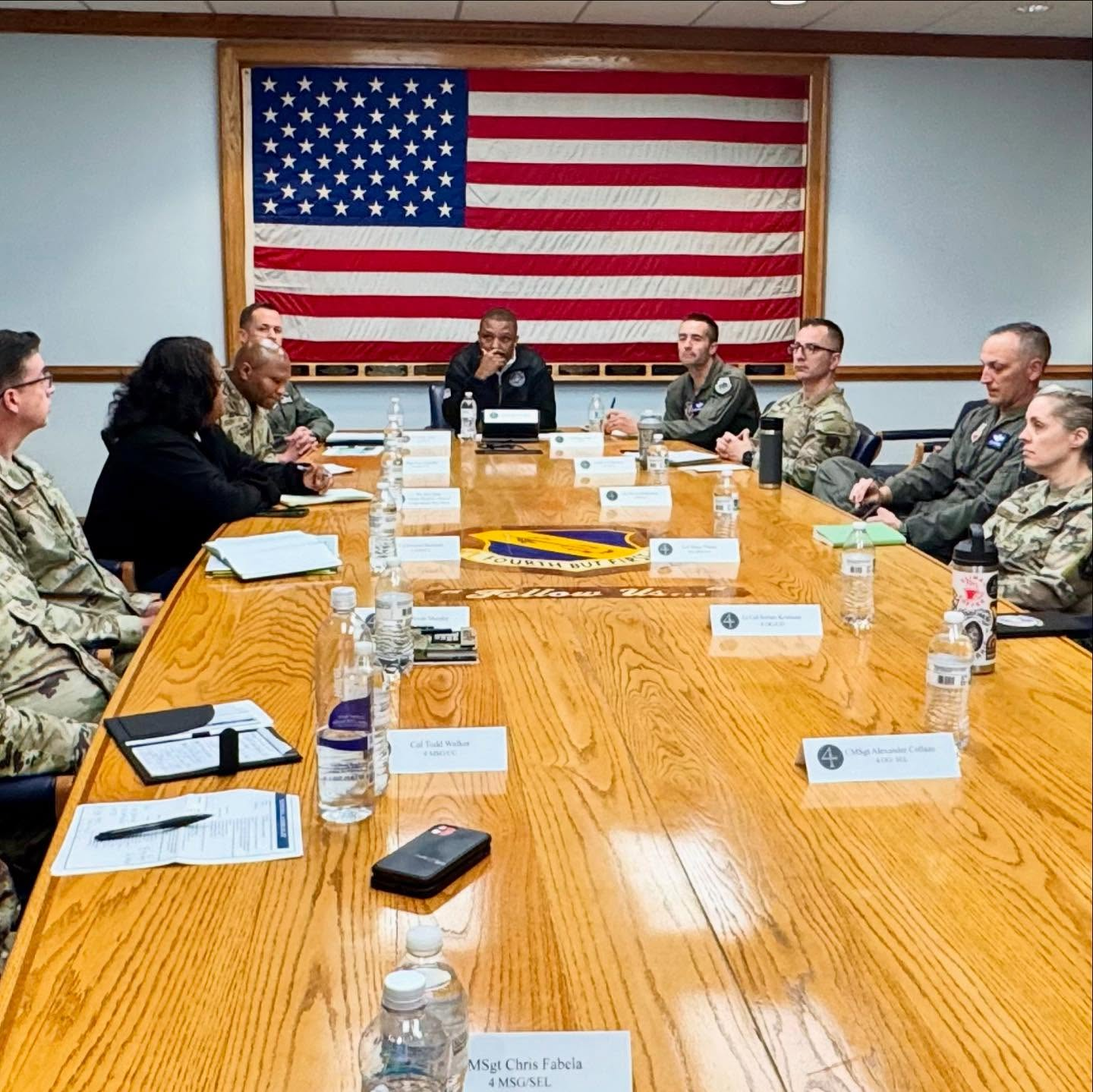
Davis visits Seymour Johnson Air Force Base, 2025

Davis' committee assignments for the 119th Congress include:

- Committee on Agriculture:
  - Agriculture Subcommittee on Commodity Markets, Digital Assets, and Rural Development (ranking member)
  - Agriculture Subcommittee on General Farm Commodities, Risk Management, and Credit
  - Agriculture Subcommittee on Livestock, Dairy, & Poultry
- Armed Services Committee (vice ranking member):
  - Armed Services Subcommittee on Readiness
  - Armed Services Subcommittee on Military Personnel

=== Caucus memberships ===
Davis' caucus memberships include:

- New Democrat Coalition
- Congressional Black Caucus
- Problem Solvers Caucus

== Political positions ==
Davis has been described as a moderate Democrat. In 2024, the Lugar Center ranked him as the most bipartisan North Carolina representative and freshman Democrat in the House, and in 2025 his office received the Congressional Management Foundation's Democracy Award for bipartisan engagement.

== Personal life ==
Davis and his wife, Yuvonka, live in Greene County, North Carolina, and have three sons. He is Presbyterian and a lay minister.

== See also ==
- List of African-American United States representatives

U.S. House of Representatives
Preceded by G. K. Butterfield	Member of the U.S. House of Representatives from North Carolina's 1st congressional district 2023–present	Incumbent
U.S. order of precedence (ceremonial)
Preceded by Jasmine Crockett	United States representatives by seniority 302nd	Succeeded by Monica De La Cruz
