= John H. Kerr Jr. =

American lawyer and politician

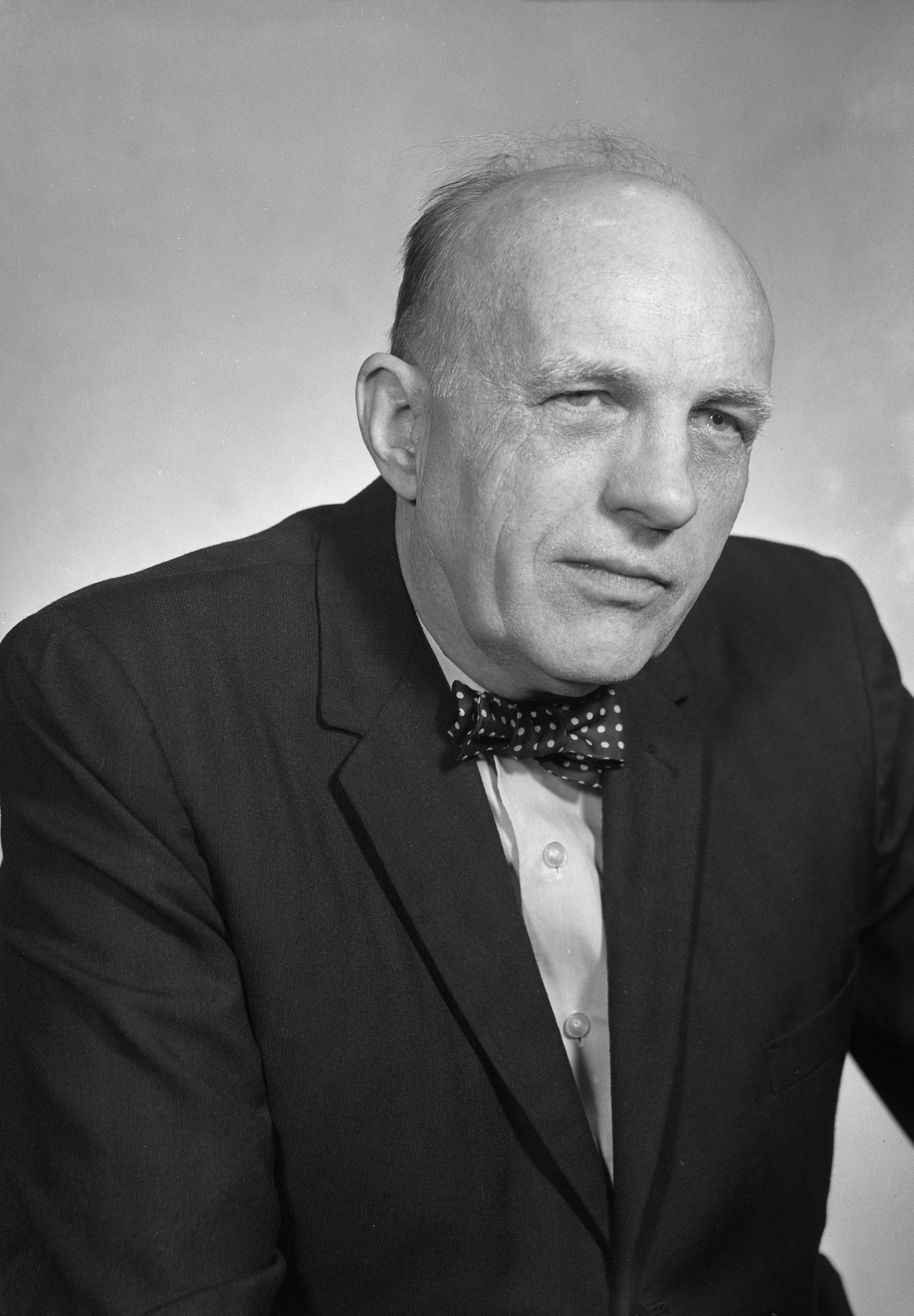
Kerr c. 1963

John Hosea Kerr Jr. (May 19, 1900 – May 28, 1968) was an American lawyer and politician.

Born in Warrenton, North Carolina, Kerr received his bachelor's from University of North Carolina at Chapel Hill and his law degree from Wake Forest University School of Law. He then practiced law in Rocky Mount, North Carolina. Kerr served in the North Carolina House of Representatives, in 1929, from Edgecombe County, North Carolina, and was a Democrat. Kerr then moved back to Warrenton, North Carolina and practiced law. From 1939 to 1949, Kerr again served in the North Carolina House of Representatives, from Warren County, North Carolina, and was speaker of the house in the 1943 session. From 1955 to 1957, Kerr served in the North Carolina State Senate and then served in the North Carolina House of Representatives from 1957 to 1963. Kerr's father was John H. Kerr who served in the United States House of Representatives and his son was John H. Kerr, III who also served in the North Carolina General Assembly. Kerr died in Warrenton, North Carolina.
