= John H. Kerr III =

American politician

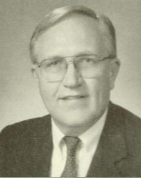
- Kerr in the 1999 legislative manual as a Senator

Member of the North Carolina Senate
- In office January 1, 1993 – January 1, 2009
- Preceded by: Henson P. Barnes
- Succeeded by: Don Davis
- Constituency: 8th district (1993–2003); 7th district (2003–2005); 5th district (2005–2009)

Member of the North Carolina House of Representatives from the 11th district
- In office January 1, 1987 – January 1, 1993
- Preceded by: Martin Lancaster
- Succeeded by: Phil Baddour

Personal details
- Born: John Hosea Kerr III; February 28, 1936 Richmond, Virginia, U.S.
- Died: May 24, 2015 (aged 79) Goldsboro, North Carolina, U.S.
- Party: Democratic
- Education: University of North Carolina at Chapel Hill (BA, JD)

John Hosea Kerr III (February 28, 1936 – May 24, 2015) was a Democratic member of the North Carolina General Assembly representing constituents in Greene, Lenoir and Wayne counties.

Born in Richmond, Virginia, Kerr grew up in Warrenton, North Carolina. He received his bachelor's degree from University of North Carolina at Chapel Hill and his law degree from University of North Carolina School of Law. An attorney from Goldsboro, North Carolina, Kerr served eight terms in the state Senate. Previously, he served three terms in the state House. In 2007, Kerr announced that he would not seek re-election in 2008. He was succeeded in office by Don Davis. Kerr died in 2015.

Kerr's grandfather, John H. Kerr, served in the United States House of Representatives. Kerr's father, John H. Kerr Jr., was a state legislator and one-time Speaker of the North Carolina House of Representatives.

North Carolina House of Representatives
Preceded by Martin Lancaster	Member of the North Carolina House of Representatives from the 11th district 1987–1993	Succeeded by Phil Baddour
North Carolina Senate
Preceded by Henson P. Barnes	Member of the North Carolina Senate from the 8th district 1993–2003	Succeeded by R. C. Soles Jr.
Preceded by Luther Jordan	Member of the North Carolina Senate from the 7th district 2003–2005	Succeeded by Doug Berger
Preceded by Tony P. Moore	Member of the North Carolina Senate from the 5th district 2005–2009	Succeeded by Don Davis
