= Phil Baddour =

American politician (born 1942)

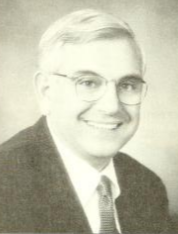
- Baddour in the 1999 legislative manual

Member of the North Carolina House of Representatives from the 11th district
- In office January 1, 1997 – January 1, 2003
- Preceded by: Louis Pate
- Succeeded by: Louis Pate
- In office January 1, 1993 – January 1, 1995
- Preceded by: John Kerr; Carolyn Russell
- Succeeded by: Louis Pate

Personal details
- Born: August 5, 1942 (age 84) Goldsboro, North Carolina, U.S.
- Party: Democratic
- Education: University of North Carolina, Chapel Hill (AB, JD)
- Profession: Attorney

Philip A. Baddour Jr. (born August 5, 1942) was a Democratic member of the North Carolina House of Representatives, representing the 11th district from 1993 through 2002. He was also House Democratic leader for two terms.

Baddour is currently chairman of the Clean Water Management Trust Fund and president of the North Carolina Advocates for Justice, one of the state's leading groups of attorneys. He has also served on the Commission for the Future of the Courts in North Carolina, the North Carolina Economic Development Board and the North Carolina Board of Transportation. He is a past president of the Goldsboro Area Chamber of Commerce, the Wayne County Economic Development Commission and the Goldsboro Rotary Club. Baddour is also a retired Colonel with the North Carolina National Guard, where he served as Staff Judge Advocate.

North Carolina House of Representatives
| Preceded by John Kerr; Carolyn Russell | Member from 11th district 1993–1995 | Succeeded by Louis Pate |
| Preceded by Louis Pate | Member from the 11th district 1997–2003 | Succeeded by Louis Pate |
