= Louis M. Pate Jr. =

American politician from North Carolina (1936–2025)

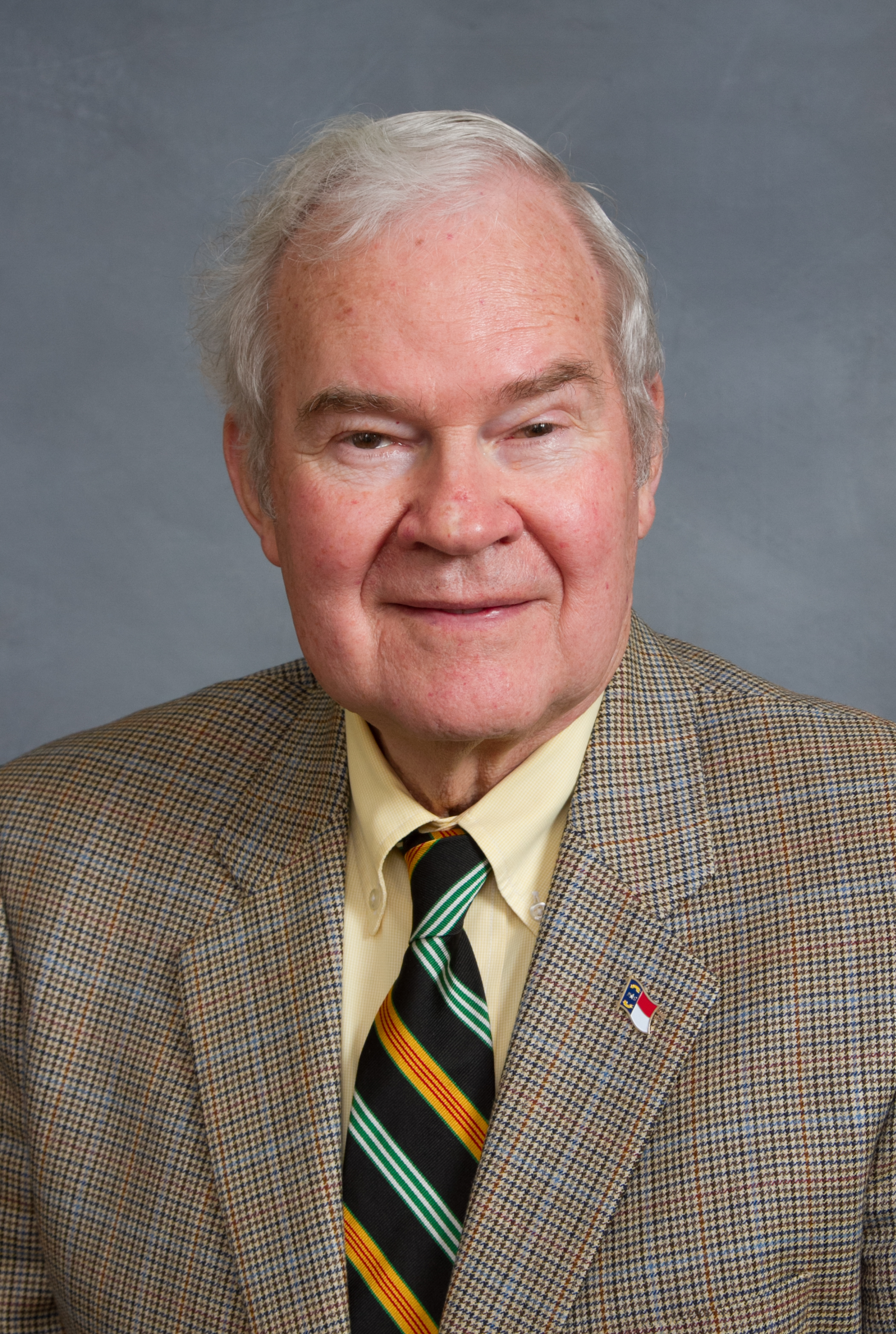

Deputy President Pro Tempore of the North Carolina Senate
- In office January 9, 2013 – January 9, 2019
- Preceded by: James Forrester
- Succeeded by: Ralph Hise

Member of the North Carolina Senate
- In office January 1, 2011 – January 14, 2019
- Preceded by: Don Davis
- Succeeded by: Jim Perry
- Constituency: 5th district (2011–2013); 7th district (2013–2019)

Member of the North Carolina House of Representatives from the 11th district
- In office January 1, 2003 – January 1, 2009
- Preceded by: Phil Baddour
- Succeeded by: Efton Sager
- In office January 1, 1995 – January 1, 1997
- Preceded by: Phil Baddour
- Succeeded by: Phil Baddour

Personal details
- Born: Louis Milford Pate Jr. September 22, 1936 Duplin County, North Carolina, U.S.
- Died: August 29, 2025 (aged 88) Mount Olive, North Carolina, U.S.
- Party: Republican
- Spouse: Joyce
- Education: Golden Gate University
- Occupation: Businessman

Louis Milford Pate Jr. (September 22, 1936 – August 29, 2025) was an American politician who served as a Republican member of the North Carolina General Assembly. He represented the state's eleventh House district from 1995 through 1996 and from 2003 through 2009. His district included constituents in Wayne County. Pate later was elected as the State Senator representing the 7th district (including constituents in Lenoir, Pitt, and Wayne counties). He resigned from the Senate on January 14, 2019, citing his health.

Pate was a mayor, city council member and retired merchant from Mount Olive, North Carolina. He served as Mount Olive's mayor from 1991 to 1994 and again from 1999 until 2002.

Pate was a delegate at the 2008 Republican National Convention in Saint Paul, Minnesota. The same year, he ran for the North Carolina Senate but was defeated in the general election by Don Davis. He then defeated Davis in a rematch in 2010, and, following redistricting, was elected to represent the new 7th district in 2012. Pate ran unopposed in 2016.

Pate served 20 years in the Air Force and retired as a Major in 1982. In Vietnam, Pate navigated B-57 bombers. Later in his career, he navigated F-111s.

Pate died in Mount Olive, North Carolina, on August 29, 2025, at the age of 88.

Standing or Select Committee	Status
Appropriations on Health and Human Services	Co-chairman
Appropriations/Base Budget	Member
Education/Higher Education	Member
Health Care	Co-chairman
Rules and Operations of the Senate	Member

Non-Standing Committee	Status
Joint Legislative Study Committee on the Division of Local School Administrative Units (2017)	Member
Joint Legislative Commission on Governmental Operations	Ex Officio
Joint Legislative Oversight Committee on Health and Human Services	Chairman
Joint Legislative Oversight Committee on Medicaid and NC Health Choice	Member
Task Force on Sentencing Reforms for Opioid Drug Convictions (2017)	Member

North Carolina House of Representatives
Preceded by Phil Baddour	Member from the 11th districtl 1995–1997	Succeeded by Phil Baddour
Preceded by Phil Baddour	Member from 11th district 2003–2009	Succeeded by Efton Sager
North Carolina Senate
Preceded by Don Davis	Member from 5th district 2011–2013	Succeeded by Don Davis
Preceded by Doug Berger	Member from 7th district 2013–2019	Succeeded by Jim Perry
