= North Carolina's 7th Senate district =

American legislative district

North Carolina's 7th State Senate district
Senator
Michael Lee; R–Wilmington
- Demographics: 77% White; 10% Black; 7% Hispanic; 1% Asian; 1% Other; 4% Multiracial
- Population (2023): 213,355

North Carolina's 7th Senate district is one of 50 districts in the North Carolina Senate. It has been represented by Republican Michael Lee since 2023.

== Geography ==
Since 2023, the district has covered most of New Hanover County. The district overlaps with the 18th, 19th, and 20th house districts.

== District officeholders since 1973 ==
=== Multi-member district ===
Senator	Party	Dates	Notes	Senator	Party	Dates	Notes	Counties
James Russell Kirby (Wilson)	Democratic	January 1, 1973 – January 1, 1977	Redistricted from the 8th district.	Dallas Alford Jr. (Rocky Mount)	Democratic	January 1, 1973 – January 1, 1983	Redistricted to the 10th district.	1973–1983; All of Vance, Warren, Franklin, Nash, and Wilson counties.
James Davis Speed (Louisburg)	Democratic	January 1, 1977 – January 1, 1983	Redistricted to the 11th district.	Dallas Alford Jr. (Rocky Mount)	Democratic	January 1, 1973 – January 1, 1983	Redistricted to the 10th district.	1973–1983; All of Vance, Warren, Franklin, Nash, and Wilson counties.

=== Single-member district ===
Senator	Party	Dates	Notes	Counties
Julius Arnette Wright (Wilmington)	Republican	January 1, 1983 – June 1, 1985	Redistricted from the 4th district. Resigned.	1983–1993; All of New Hanover County. Part of Pender County.
Vacant		June 1, 1985 – June 4, 1985		1983–1993; All of New Hanover County. Part of Pender County.
Franklin Ervin Williams (Wilmington)	Republican	June 4, 1985 – January 1, 1987	Appointed to finish Wright's term.	1983–1993; All of New Hanover County. Part of Pender County.
Franklin Lee Block (Wrightsville Beach)	Democratic	January 1, 1987 – January 1, 1993		1983–1993; All of New Hanover County. Part of Pender County.
Luther Jordan (Wilmington)	Democratic	January 1, 1993 – April 23, 2002	Died.	1993–2003; Parts of New Hanover, Pender, Onslow, Jones, and Lenoir counties.
Vacant		April 23, 2002 – January 1, 2003		1993–2003; Parts of New Hanover, Pender, Onslow, Jones, and Lenoir counties.
John Kerr III (Goldsboro)	Democratic	January 1, 2003 – January 1, 2005	Redistricted from the 8th district. Redistricted to the 5th district.	2003–2005; All of Greene and Lenoir counties. Part of Wayne County.
Doug Berger (Youngsville)	Democratic	January 1, 2005 – January 1, 2013	Redistricted to the 18th district and lost re-election.	2005–2013; All of Granville, Vance, Warren, and Franklin counties.
Louis Pate (Mount Olive)	Republican	January 1, 2013 – January 14, 2019	Redistricted from the 5th district. Resigned.	2013–2019; Parts of Wayne, Lenoir, and Pitt counties.
Louis Pate (Mount Olive)	Republican	January 1, 2013 – January 14, 2019	Redistricted from the 5th district. Resigned.	2019–2023; All of Wayne and Lenoir counties.
Vacant		January 14, 2019 – January 31, 2019		2019–2023; All of Wayne and Lenoir counties.
Jim Perry (Kinston)	Republican	January 31, 2019 – January 1, 2023	Appointed to finish Pate's term. Redistricted to the 2nd district.	2019–2023; All of Wayne and Lenoir counties.
Michael Lee (Wilmington)	Republican	January 1, 2023 – Present	Redistricted from the 9th district.	2023–Present; Most of New Hanover County.

== Election results ==
=== 2024 ===
North Carolina Senate 7th district general election, 2024
Party	Candidate	Votes	%
Republican	Michael Lee (incumbent)	63,217	52.21%
Democratic	David Hill	52,953	43.74%
Libertarian	John Evans	4,903	4.05%
Total votes		121,073	100%
Republican hold			

=== 2022 ===
North Carolina Senate 7th district general election, 2022
Party	Candidate	Votes	%
Republican	Michael Lee (incumbent)	44,908	50.97%
Democratic	Marcia Morgan	43,198	49.03%
Total votes		88,106	100%
Republican hold			

=== 2020 ===
North Carolina Senate 7th district Republican primary election, 2020
Party	Candidate	Votes	%
Republican	Jim Perry (incumbent)	10,214	65.94%
Republican	Billy Strickland	5,275	34.06%
Total votes		15,489	100%

North Carolina Senate 7th district general election, 2020
Party	Candidate	Votes	%
Republican	Jim Perry (incumbent)	45,364	55.25%
Democratic	Donna Lake	36,737	44.75%
Total votes		82,101	100%
Republican hold			

=== 2018 ===
North Carolina Senate 7th district general election, 2018
Party	Candidate	Votes	%
Republican	Louis Pate (incumbent)	30,329	53.90%
Democratic	David B. Brantley	25,940	46.10%
Total votes		56,269	100%
Republican hold			

=== 2016 ===
North Carolina Senate 7th district general election, 2016
Party	Candidate	Votes	%
Republican	Louis Pate (incumbent)	66,035	100%
Total votes		66,035	100%
Republican hold			

=== 2014 ===
North Carolina Senate 7th district general election, 2014
Party	Candidate	Votes	%
Republican	Louis Pate (incumbent)	37,323	68.80%
Democratic	Erik Anderson	16,924	31.20%
Total votes		54,247	100%
Republican hold			

=== 2012 ===
North Carolina Senate 7th district general election, 2012
Party	Candidate	Votes	%
Republican	Louis Pate (incumbent)	60,120	100%
Total votes		60,120	100%
Republican hold			

=== 2010 ===
North Carolina Senate 7th district Democratic primary election, 2010
Party	Candidate	Votes	%
Democratic	Doug Berger (incumbent)	11,742	65.19%
Democratic	Ronald R. Alligood	6,269	34.81%
Total votes		18,011	100%

North Carolina Senate 7th district general election, 2010
Party	Candidate	Votes	%
Democratic	Doug Berger (incumbent)	27,084	51.80%
Republican	Michael Schriver	25,206	48.20%
Total votes		52,290	100%
Democratic hold			

=== 2008 ===
North Carolina Senate 7th district general election, 2008
Party	Candidate	Votes	%
Democratic	Doug Berger (incumbent)	48,874	61.25%
Republican	Chuck Stires	28,588	35.83%
Libertarian	Kira Howe	2,331	2.92%
Total votes		79,793	100%
Democratic hold			

=== 2006 ===
North Carolina Senate 7th district general election, 2006
Party	Candidate	Votes	%
Democratic	Doug Berger (incumbent)	22,225	60.64%
Republican	Chuck Stires	14,423	39.36%
Total votes		36,648	100%
Democratic hold			

=== 2004 ===
North Carolina Senate 7th district Democratic primary election, 2004
Party	Candidate	Votes	%
Democratic	Doug Berger	6,360	36.69%
Democratic	Darryl D. Moss	3,412	19.68%
Democratic	Bobby W. Rogers	3,292	18.99%
Democratic	C. Douglas Jackson	1,961	11.31%
Democratic	Bernard A. Holliday	1,424	8.22%
Democratic	Jack Day	884	5.10%
Total votes		17,333	100%

North Carolina Senate 7th district Democratic primary run-off election, 2004
Party	Candidate	Votes	%
Democratic	Doug Berger	4,409	51.15%
Democratic	Darryl D. Moss	4,210	48.85%
Total votes		8,619	100%

North Carolina Senate 7th district general election, 2004
Party	Candidate	Votes	%
Democratic	Doug Berger	35,091	56.87%
Republican	Harold N. Frazier	26,616	43.13%
Total votes		61,707	100%
Democratic win (new seat)			

=== 2002 ===
North Carolina Senate 7th district general election, 2002
Party	Candidate	Votes	%
Democratic	John Kerr III (incumbent)	21,211	53.95%
Republican	Carolyn B. Russell	18,108	46.05%
Total votes		39,319	100%
Democratic hold			

=== 2000 ===
North Carolina Senate 7th district Democratic primary election, 2000
Party	Candidate	Votes	%
Democratic	Luther Jordan (incumbent)	6,454	78.07%
Democratic	Ronnie J. Bell	1,813	21.93%
Total votes		8,267	100%

North Carolina Senate 7th district general election, 2000
Party	Candidate	Votes	%
Democratic	Luther Jordan (incumbent)	17,242	69.28%
Republican	Thomas R. "Tom" Mattison	7,008	28.16%
Libertarian	Stephen Shepherd	639	2.57%
Total votes		24,889	100%
Democratic hold			
