= Doug Berger =

American politician

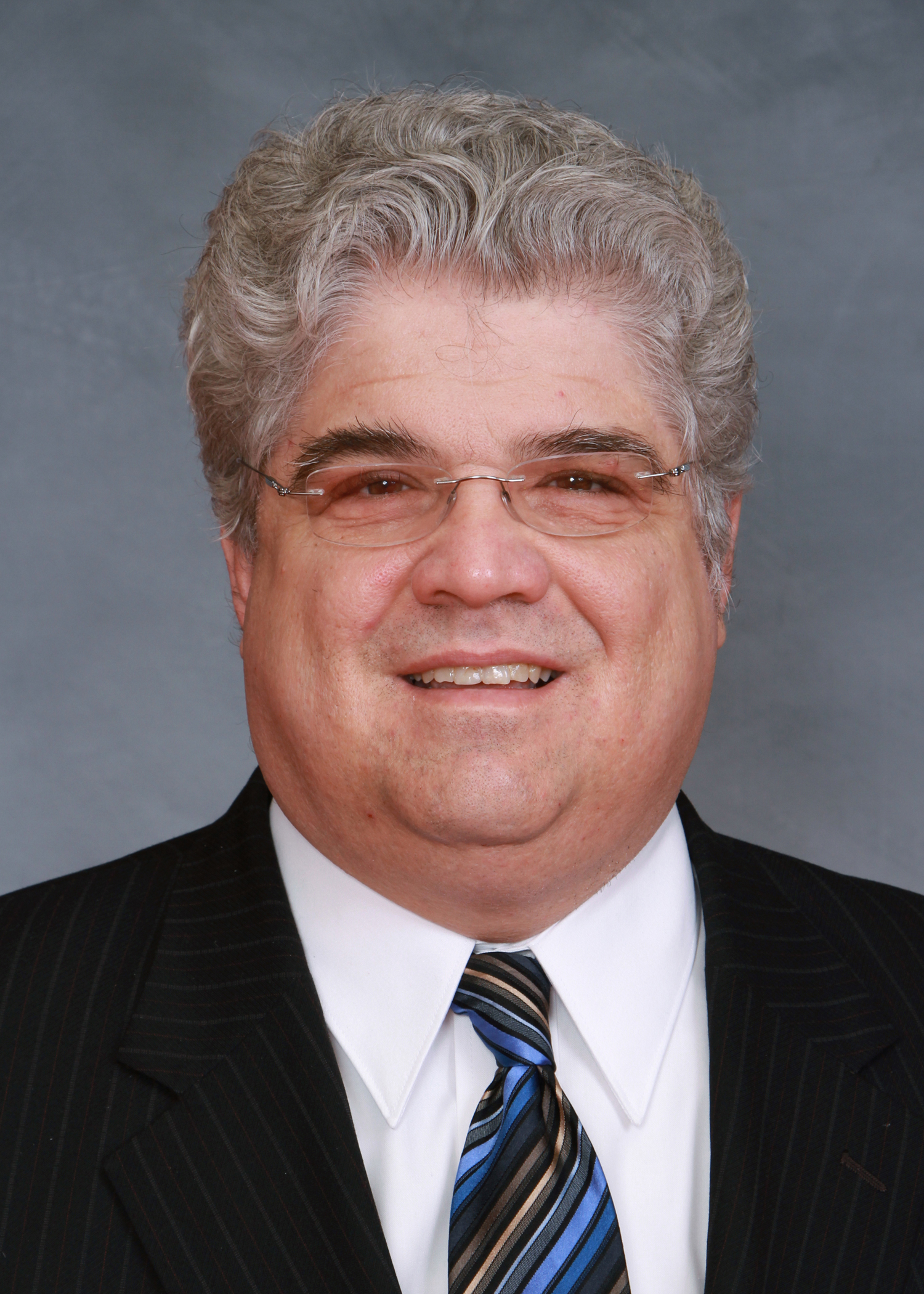

Member of the North Carolina Senate from the 7th district
- In office January 1, 2005 – January 1, 2013
- Preceded by: Constituency Established
- Succeeded by: Chad Barefoot (Redistricting)

Personal details
- Born: Smithfield, North Carolina, U.S.
- Party: Democratic
- Spouse: Annie
- Education: University of North Carolina at Chapel Hill
- Profession: Educator, attorney

Douglas E. Berger is an American attorney, former prosecutor and politician who served as a member of the North Carolina General Assembly representing the state's 7th Senate district for four terms, starting in 2005. A member of the Democratic Party, his district included Franklin County, Granville County, Vance County and Warren County.

== Biography ==
Berger is the former senator for District 18. He was born in Miami, Florida and raised in Smithfield, North Carolina where his father Jack Berger owned and operated a metal fabrication shop "Ace Welding" from 1966 to 1996. In 1978, he graduated from Smithfield Selma High School where he served as the president of his high school political science club and editorial editor of his high school newspaper. From 1978 to 1982, he attended and graduated from the University of North Carolina at Chapel Hill, where he earned Bachelor of Arts Degrees in Political Science and Speech Communications. During his college years, he became involved in a wide range of political activities. He worked as a volunteer in the John B. Anderson campaign for president in 1980. Following the 1980 campaign, he initiated the first college chapter of "Americans for Common Sense", a political group led nationally by former presidential candidate George McGovern. Upon graduation, he was employed by Ralph Nader's organization, PIRG. In October 1982, he initiated the South Africa divestment movement at UNC when he produced a report showing how UNC was investing in companies operating in South Africa. Also in 1982, he organized students to support and participate in the effort to stop the dumping of PCBs in Warren County. From 1983 to 1985, he attended the UNC School of Law. In 1983, he organized a campus political party that won 13 out of 27 seats on the student government legislative council. He was elected as a campus representative to serve the UNC School of Law. In 1985, he ran for student body president coming in first out of a field of 9 candidates only to lose in a runoff. From 1985 to 1988, he served as a public school teacher in Kinston, North Carolina, where he taught North Carolina History, United States History and World History. In 1989, he returned to law school and graduated from the University of North Carolina at Chapel Hill School of Law. In 1990, he started his legal career as an Assistant District Attorney for the 11th Judicial District, successfully prosecuting cases ranging from DWI, burglary and sexual assault to murder cases. He then moved to the 9th Judicial District where he served as an Assistant District Attorney from 1991 to 1994. From 1994 through 2004, he served in a judicial capacity as a Deputy Commissioner at the North Carolina Industrial Commission, where he rendered over 500 decisions.

== Electoral experience ==
Berger was first elected in North Carolina's seventh Senate District in 2004. He ran for the Senate after a losing bid for the state's Commissioner of Labor in 2000.

=== Commissioner of Labor race ===
During his race for North Carolina Commissioner of Labor, North Carolina Democratic Party leaders questioned Berger's past involvement with the Democratic Socialists of America. A private internal memo between two party leaders became public during the N.C. Board of Elections investigation of former N.C. Governor Mike Easley. The memo's author states, "We need to decide whether it's worth attempting to find a replacement for Berger now. If not, then we need to work on a damn good response to the attack."

Berger's involvement with the socialist group became an issue in the general election campaign being cited in several news reports. The Associated Press and Triangle Business Journal wrote about his socialist past during the 2000 election. The Carolina Journal brought it up again during Berger's first race for state senate.

North Carolina Commissioner of Labor, November 7, 2000
Party	Candidate	Votes	%
Republican	Cherie K. Berry	1,379,417	50.13
Democratic	Doug Berger	1,372,165	49.87

=== N.C. Senate races ===
Berger defeated Republican Harold Frazier in 2004 with 57% percent of the vote. The election box below shows the results of his subsequent elections.

North Carolina Senate District 7, November 2, 2004
Party	Candidate	Votes	%
Democratic	Doug Berger	35,091	57
Republican	Harold N. Frazier	26,616	43

North Carolina Senate District 7, November 7, 2006
Party	Candidate	Votes	%
Democratic	Doug Berger	22,225	61
Republican	Chuck Stires	14,423	39

North Carolina Senate District 7, November 4, 2008
Party	Candidate	Votes	%
Democratic	Doug Berger	48,874	61
Republican	Chuck Stires	28,588	36

North Carolina Senate District 7, November 2, 2010
Party	Candidate	Votes	%
Democratic	Doug Berger	27,084	52
Republican	Michael Schriver	25,206	48

North Carolina Senate District 18, November 6, 2012
Party	Candidate	Votes	%
Republican	Chad Barefoot	51,873	55.92
Democratic	Doug Berger	40,897	44.08

== Professional experience ==
Berger joined the Law Offices of James Scott Farrin in 2005 where he handles Workers’ Compensation litigation and dispute resolution.

Berger is a member of the North Carolina State Bar, the North Carolina Bar Association, the State Employees Association of North Carolina and the North Carolina Advocates for Justice.

Party political offices
Preceded by Harry Payne	Democratic nominee for North Carolina Commissioner of Labor; 2000	Succeeded by Wayne Goodwin
