= North Carolina's 8th Senate district =

American legislative district

North Carolina's 8th State Senate district
Senator
Bill Rabon; R–Winnabow
- Demographics: 74% White; 14% Black; 6% Hispanic; 1% Asian; 1% Native American; 4% Multiracial
- Population (2023): 214,201

North Carolina's 8th Senate district is one of 50 districts in the North Carolina Senate. It has been represented by Republican Bill Rabon since 2011.

== Geography ==
Since 2023, the district has included all of Columbus and Brunswick counties, as well as a small sliver of New Hanover County. The district overlaps with the 17th, 18th, 19th, and 46th state house districts.

== District officeholders since 1965 ==
=== Single-member district ===
Senator	Party	Dates	Notes	Counties
Julian Russell Allsbrook (Roanoke Rapids)	Democratic	January 1, 1965 – January 1, 1967	Redistricted to the 4th district.	1965–1967; All of Warren and Halifax counties.

=== Multi-member district ===
Senator	Party	Dates	Notes	Senator	Party	Dates	Notes	Counties
Jesse Hinnant Austin Jr. (Clayton)	Democratic	January 1, 1967 – January 1, 1969		Dallas Alford Jr. (Rocky Mount)	Democratic	January 1, 1967 – January 1, 1969	Redistricted from the 12th district.	1967–1973; All of Johnston, Nash, and Wilson counties.
James Russell Kirby (Wilson)	Democratic	January 1, 1969 – January 1, 1973	Redistricted to the 7th district.	J. Marvin Johnson (Smithfield)	Democratic	January 1, 1969 – January 1, 1971		1967–1973; All of Johnston, Nash, and Wilson counties.
James Russell Kirby (Wilson)	Democratic	January 1, 1969 – January 1, 1973	Redistricted to the 7th district.	Henry Mariott Milgrom (Battleboro)	Democratic	January 1, 1971 – January 1, 1973		1967–1973; All of Johnston, Nash, and Wilson counties.

=== Single-member district ===
Senator	Party	Dates	Notes	Counties
Thomas Edward Strickland (Goldsboro)	Democratic	January 1, 1973 – January 1, 1977	Redistricted from the 9th district.	1973–1993; All of Wayne and Greene counties.
Henson Barnes (Goldsboro)	Democratic	January 1, 1977 – January 1, 1993	Retired.	1973–1993; All of Wayne and Greene counties.
John Kerr III (Goldsboro)	Democratic	January 1, 1993 – January 1, 2003	Redistricted to the 7th district.	1993–2003; All of Wayne and Greene counties. Part of Lenoir County.
R. C. Soles Jr. (Tabor City)	Democratic	January 1, 2003 – January 1, 2011	Redistricted from the 18th district. Retired.	2003–2013; All of Columbus, Brunswick, and Pender counties.
Bill Rabon (Winnabow)	Republican	January 1, 2011 – Present		2003–2013; All of Columbus, Brunswick, and Pender counties.
Bill Rabon (Winnabow)	Republican	January 1, 2011 – Present		2013–2023; All of Bladen, Pender, and Brunswick counties. Part of New Hanover County.
Bill Rabon (Winnabow)	Republican	January 1, 2011 – Present		2023–Present; All of Columbus and Brunswick counties. Part of New Hanover County.

== Election results ==
=== 2024 ===
North Carolina Senate 8th district general election, 2024
Party	Candidate	Votes	%
Republican	Bill Rabon (incumbent)	87,026	59.90%
Democratic	Katherine Randall	58,259	40.10%
Total votes		145,285	100%
Republican hold			

=== 2022 ===
North Carolina Senate 8th district general election, 2022
Party	Candidate	Votes	%
Republican	Bill Rabon (incumbent)	67,693	100%
Total votes		67,693	100%
Republican hold			

=== 2020 ===
North Carolina Senate 8th district Libertarian primary election, 2020
Party	Candidate	Votes	%
Libertarian	Anthony Mascolo	74	57.81%
Libertarian	Ethan Bickley	54	42.19%
Total votes		128	100%

North Carolina Senate 8th district general election, 2020
Party	Candidate	Votes	%
Republican	Bill Rabon (incumbent)	85,484	62.01%
Democratic	David Sink	48,040	34.85%
Libertarian	Anthony Mascolo	4,335	3.14%
Total votes		137,859	100%
Republican hold			

=== 2018 ===
North Carolina Senate 8th district Libertarian primary election, 2018
Party	Candidate	Votes	%
Libertarian	Anthony H. Mascolo	53	58.24%
Libertarian	Randolph W. "Randy" Crow	38	41.76%
Total votes		91	100%

North Carolina Senate 8th district general election, 2018
Party	Candidate	Votes	%
Republican	Bill Rabon (incumbent)	55,024	58.55%
Democratic	David W. Sink Jr.	36,191	38.51%
Libertarian	Anthony H. Mascolo	2,764	2.94%
Total votes		93,979	100%
Republican hold			

=== 2016 ===
North Carolina Senate 8th district general election, 2016
Party	Candidate	Votes	%
Republican	Bill Rabon (incumbent)	78,274	100%
Total votes		78,274	100%
Republican hold			

=== 2014 ===
North Carolina Senate 8th district general election, 2014
Party	Candidate	Votes	%
Republican	Bill Rabon (incumbent)	39,402	57.01%
Democratic	Ernie Ward	29,707	42.99%
Total votes		69,109	100%
Republican hold			

=== 2012 ===
North Carolina Senate 8th district general election, 2012
Party	Candidate	Votes	%
Republican	Bill Rabon (incumbent)	58,282	59.96%
Democratic	Danny Hefner	38,919	40.04%
Total votes		97,201	100%
Republican hold			

=== 2010 ===
North Carolina Senate 8th district Republican election, 2010
Party	Candidate	Votes	%
Republican	Bill Rabon	9,406	66.83%
Republican	Bettie Fennell	4,669	33.17%
Total votes		14,075	100%

North Carolina Senate 8th district general election, 2010
Party	Candidate	Votes	%
Republican	Bill Rabon	46,216	63.55%
Democratic	David Redwine	26,511	36.45%
Total votes		72,727	100%
Republican gain from Democratic			

=== 2008 ===
North Carolina Senate 8th district general election, 2008
Party	Candidate	Votes	%
Democratic	R. C. Soles Jr. (incumbent)	47,905	48.66%
Republican	Bettie Fennell	45,093	45.80%
Libertarian	Rachel Joiner Merrill	5,454	5.54%
Total votes		98,452	100%
Democratic hold			

=== 2006 ===
North Carolina Senate 8th district general election, 2006
Party	Candidate	Votes	%
Democratic	R. C. Soles Jr. (incumbent)	26,407	52.59%
Republican	Bill Fairley	23,802	47.41%
Total votes		50,209	100%
Democratic hold			

=== 2004 ===
North Carolina Senate 8th district general election, 2004
Party	Candidate	Votes	%
Democratic	R. C. Soles Jr. (incumbent)	39,897	54.26%
Republican	Jack Swann	33,627	45.74%
Total votes		73,524	100%
Democratic hold			

=== 2002 ===
North Carolina Senate 8th district Republican election, 2002
Party	Candidate	Votes	%
Republican	Ray Gilbert	3,208	56.47%
Republican	Dial Gray	2,473	43.53%
Total votes		5,681	100%

North Carolina District 8th district general election, 2002
Party	Candidate	Votes	%
Democratic	R. C. Soles Jr. (incumbent)	28,513	54.56%
Republican	Ray Gilbert	20,993	40.17%
Libertarian	Edward Gore	2,750	5.26%
Total votes		52,256	100%
Democratic hold			

=== 2000 ===
North Carolina Senate 8th district general election, 2000
Party	Candidate	Votes	%
Democratic	John Kerr III (incumbent)	26,283	60.72%
Republican	Ed Wharton	17,001	39.28%
Total votes		43,284	100%
Democratic hold			
