= North Carolina's 5th Senate district =

American legislative district

North Carolina's 5th State Senate district
Senator
Kandie Smith; D–Greenville
- Demographics: 48% White; 40% Black; 7% Hispanic; 1% Asian; 3% Multiracial
- Population (2023): 221,056

North Carolina's 5th Senate district is one of 50 districts in the North Carolina Senate. It has been represented by Democrat Kandie Smith since 2023.

== Geography ==
Since 2019, the district has covered all of Edgecombe and Pitt counties. The district overlaps with the 8th, 9th, and 23rd state house districts.

== District officeholders since 1973 ==
Senator	Party	Dates	Notes	Counties
Harold Hardison (Deep Run)	Democratic	January 1, 1973 – January 1, 1989	Retired to run for Lieutenant Governor.	1973–1983; All of Duplin, Lenoir, and Jones counties.
Harold Hardison (Deep Run)	Democratic	January 1, 1973 – January 1, 1989	Retired to run for Lieutenant Governor.	1983–1993; All of Duplin, Lenoir, and Jones counties. Part of Pender County.
Wendell Murphy (Rose Hill)	Democratic	January 1, 1989 – January 1, 1993	Retired.	1983–1993; All of Duplin, Lenoir, and Jones counties. Part of Pender County.
Charles Albertson (Beulaville)	Democratic	January 1, 1993 – January 1, 2003	Redistricted to the 10th district.	1993–2003; All of Duplin County. Parts of Sampson, Pender, Onslow, and Jones counties.
Tony Moore (Winterville)	Democratic	January 1, 2003 – November 24, 2003	Switched parties. Lost re-election.	2003–2005; All of Wilson County. Part of Pitt County.
Tony Moore (Winterville)	Republican	November 24, 2003 – January 1, 2005	Switched parties. Lost re-election.	2003–2005; All of Wilson County. Part of Pitt County.
John Kerr III (Goldsboro)	Democratic	January 1, 2005 – January 1, 2009	Redistricted from the 7th district. Retired.	2005–2013; All of Greene County. Parts of Wayne and Pitt counties.
Don Davis (Snow Hill)	Democratic	January 1, 2009 – January 1, 2011	Lost re-election.	2005–2013; All of Greene County. Parts of Wayne and Pitt counties.
Louis Pate (Mount Olive)	Republican	January 1, 2011 – January 1, 2013	Redistricted to the 7th district.	2005–2013; All of Greene County. Parts of Wayne and Pitt counties.
Don Davis (Snow Hill)	Democratic	January 1, 2013 – January 1, 2023	Retired to run for Congress.	2013–2019; All of Greene County. Parts of Wayne, Lenoir, and Pitt counties.
Don Davis (Snow Hill)	Democratic	January 1, 2013 – January 1, 2023	Retired to run for Congress.	2019–2023; All of Greene and Pitt counties.
Kandie Smith (Greenville)	Democratic	January 1, 2023 – Present		2023–Present; All of Edgecombe and Pitt counties.

== Election results ==
=== 2024 ===
North Carolina Senate 5th district general election, 2024
Party	Candidate	Votes	%
Democratic	Kandie Smith (incumbent)	59,440	55.08%
Republican	Alexander Paschall	48,469	44.92%
Total votes		107,909	100%
Democratic hold			

=== 2022 ===
Democratic primary for the 2022 North Carolina Senate 5th district election
Party	Candidate	Votes	%
Democratic	Kandie Smith	13,604	86.58%
Democratic	Lenton Brown	2,109	13.42%
Total votes		15,713	100%

2022 North Carolina Senate 5th district general election
Party	Candidate	Votes	%
Democratic	Kandie Smith	36,557	52.23%
Republican	Karen Kozel	33,432	47.77%
Total votes		69,989	100%
Democratic hold			

=== 2020 ===
2020 North Carolina Senate 5th district general election
Party	Candidate	Votes	%
Democratic	Don Davis (incumbent)	51,702	55.12%
Republican	Karen Kozel	42,104	44.88%
Total votes		93,806	100%
Democratic hold			

=== 2018 ===
Democratic primary for the 2018 North Carolina Senate 5th district election
Party	Candidate	Votes	%
Democratic	Don Davis (incumbent)	11,011	77.35%
Democratic	Lonnie Carraway	3,224	22.65%
Total votes		14,235	100%

Republican primary for the 2018 North Carolina Senate 5th district election
Party	Candidate	Votes	%
Republican	Kimberly Robb	4,189	51.95%
Republican	Tony Moore	3,875	48.05%
Total votes		8,064	100%

2018 North Carolina Senate 5th district general election
Party	Candidate	Votes	%
Democratic	Don Davis (incumbent)	36,321	55.34%
Republican	Kimberly Robb	29,317	44.66%
Total votes		65,638	100%
Democratic hold			

=== 2016 ===
2016 North Carolina Senate 5th district general election
Party	Candidate	Votes	%
Democratic	Don Davis (incumbent)	57,882	100%
Total votes		57,882	100%
Democratic hold			

=== 2014 ===
2014 North Carolina Senate 5th district general election
Party	Candidate	Votes	%
Democratic	Don Davis (incumbent)	35,740	100%
Total votes		35,740	100%
Democratic hold			

=== 2012 ===
2012 North Carolina Senate 5th district general election
Party	Candidate	Votes	%
Democratic	Don Davis	59,648	100%
Total votes		59,648	100%
Democratic win (new seat)			

=== 2010 ===
2010 North Carolina Senate 5th district general election
Party	Candidate	Votes	%
Republican	Louis Pate	25,780	54.54%
Democratic	Don Davis (incumbent)	21,488	45.46%
Total votes		47,268	100%
Republican gain from Democratic			

=== 2008 ===
Democratic primary for the 2008 North Carolina Senate 5th district election
Party	Candidate	Votes	%
Democratic	Don Davis	10,303	35.81%
Democratic	Kathy A. Taft	6,942	24.13%
Democratic	Ed Wilson	3,882	13.49%
Democratic	Tony Moore	3,553	12.35%
Democratic	Chuck Stone	2,514	8.74%
Democratic	Charles Elliott Johnson	1,581	5.49%
Total votes		28,775	100%

Democratic primary run-off for the 2008 North Carolina Senate 5th district election
Party	Candidate	Votes	%
Democratic	Don Davis	5,494	62.77%
Democratic	Kathy A. Taft	3,259	37.23%
Total votes		8,753	100%

2008 North Carolina Senate 5th district general election
Party	Candidate	Votes	%
Democratic	Don Davis	40,982	52.90%
Republican	Louis Pate	36,493	47.10%
Total votes		77,475	100%
Democratic hold			

=== 2006 ===
2006 North Carolina Senate 5th district general election
Party	Candidate	Votes	%
Democratic	John Kerr III (incumbent)	17,865	58.43%
Republican	Todd Siebels	12,711	41.57%
Total votes		30,576	100%
Democratic hold			

=== 2004 ===
2004 North Carolina Senate 5th district general election
Party	Candidate	Votes	%
Democratic	John Kerr III (incumbent)	34,162	56.80%
Republican	Tony Moore (incumbent)	25,987	43.20%
Total votes		60,149	100%
Democratic hold			

=== 2002 ===
Democratic primary for the 2002 North Carolina Senate 5th district election
Party	Candidate	Votes	%
Democratic	Tony Moore	5,005	33.94%
Democratic	James M. Johnson III	4,859	32.95%
Democratic	William L. Neill	2,511	17.03%
Democratic	Robert Wheeler Jr.	2,371	16.08%
Total votes		14,746	100%

Republican primary for the 2002 North Carolina Senate 5th district election
Party	Candidate	Votes	%
Republican	Tom Coulson	3,651	69.74%
Republican	George H. Gray	1,584	30.26%
Total votes		5,235	100%

2002 North Carolina Senate 5th district general election
Party	Candidate	Votes	%
Democratic	Tony Moore	22,265	50.86%
Republican	Tom Coulson	20,992	47.95%
Libertarian	Christopher Ruff	521	1.19%
Total votes		43,778	100%
Democratic win (new seat)			

=== 2000 ===
2000 North Carolina Senate 5th district general election
Party	Candidate	Votes	%
Democratic	Charles Albertson (incumbent)	28,166	59.58%
Republican	Cynthia B. Watson	19,109	40.42%
Total votes		47,275	100%
Democratic hold			
