= 2020 United States Senate election in North Carolina =

US state election

- November 3, 2020
- Turnout: 77.4% ▲
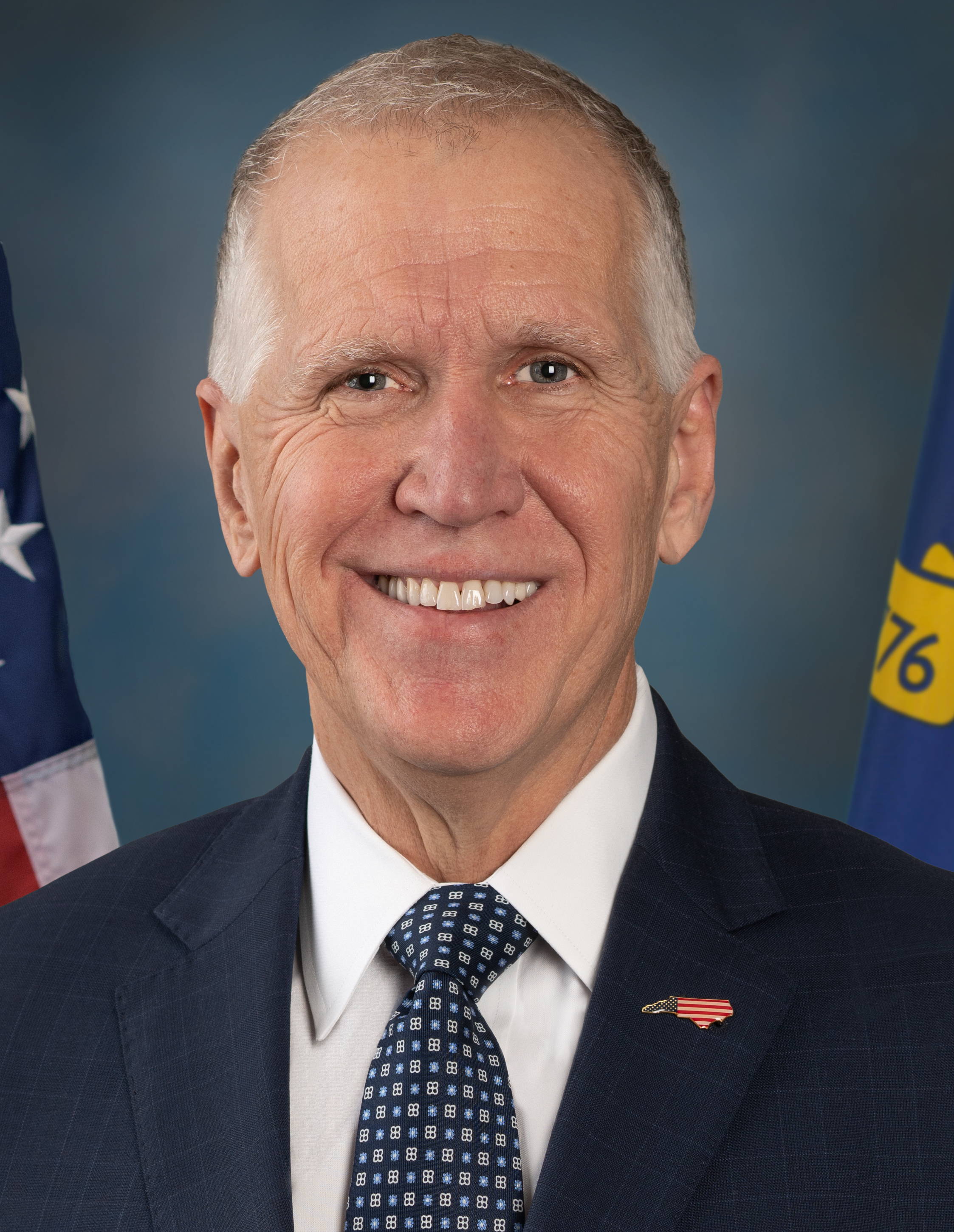

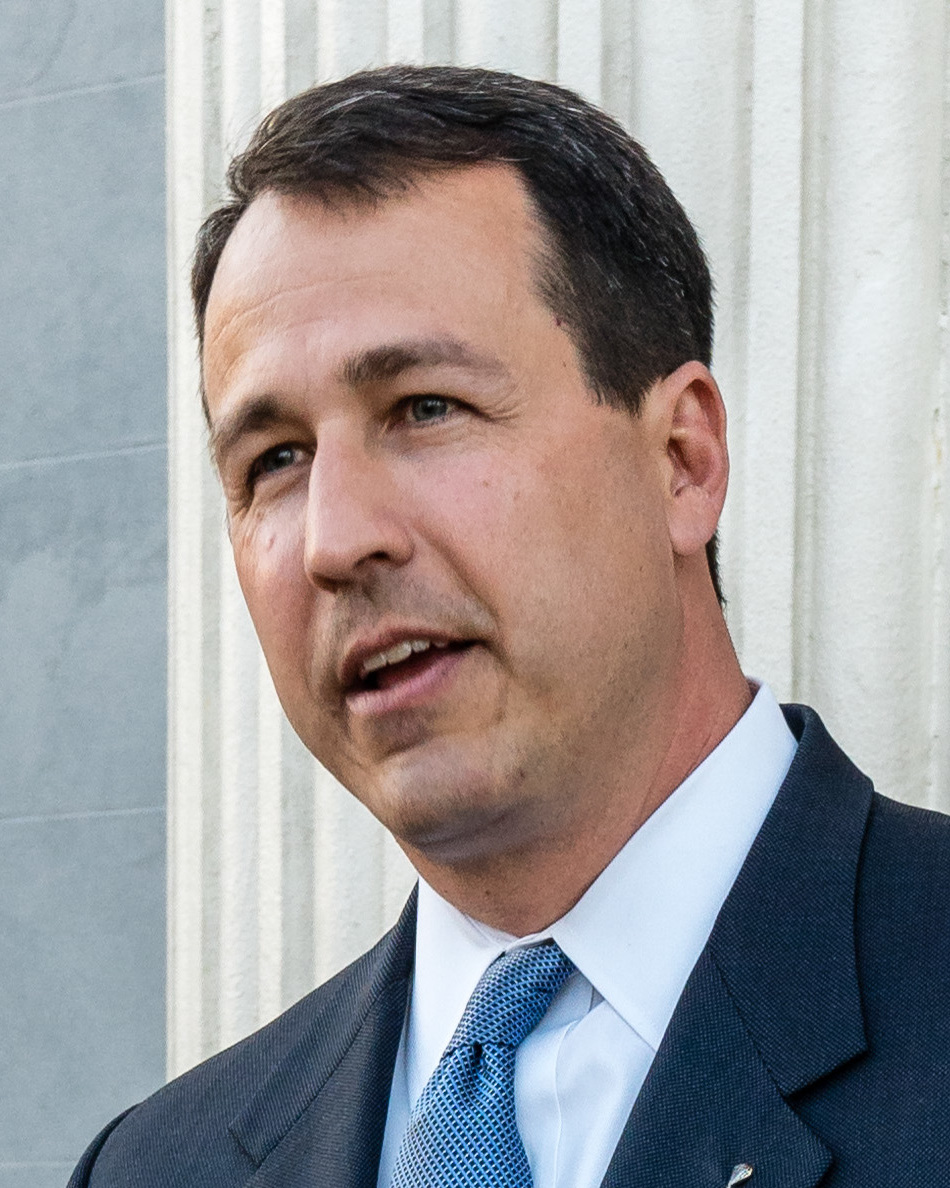
Nominee	Thom Tillis	Cal Cunningham
Party	Republican	Democratic
Popular vote	2,665,598	2,569,965
Percentage	48.69%	46.94%
- Tillis: 40–50% 50–60% 60–70% 70–80% 80–90% >90% Cunningham: 40–50% 50–60% 60–70% 70–80% 80–90% >90% Tie: 40–50%
U.S. senator before election
Thom Tillis
Republican
Elected U.S. Senator
Thom Tillis
Republican

The 2020 United States Senate election in North Carolina was held on November 3, 2020, to elect a member of the United States Senate to represent the State of North Carolina, concurrently with the 2020 United States presidential election, elections to the United States Senate in other states, elections to the United States House of Representatives, and various state and local elections. North Carolina was one of just five states holding presidential, gubernatorial, and senatorial elections concurrently in 2020. On March 3, 2020, Republican incumbent Thom Tillis and former Democratic state senator Cal Cunningham won their respective primaries.

Cunningham led Tillis in the polls throughout much of the campaign. In early October 2020, it was reported that Cunningham had exchanged sexually suggestive messages with a married woman who was not his wife. Cunningham confirmed the texts were authentic and apologized for his behavior. The woman stated that she had a consensual physical relationship with Cunningham in 2020.

Tillis was elected to a second and final term, outperforming pre-election polling to win a narrow victory, breaking the "one-term curse" that existed with this particular Senate seat for over twenty years; as no incumbent had been re-elected to this seat since 1996 when Jesse Helms won reelection. On November 10, 2020, a week after Election Day, Cunningham called Tillis to concede the race. Tillis won by a margin of 1.8% over Cunningham, slightly larger than his 1.5% victory in 2014. Tillis received a smaller vote share than Donald Trump's 49.93%, but slightly overperformed his margin of victory in North Carolina.

== Republican primary ==
=== Candidates ===
==== Nominee ====
- Thom Tillis, incumbent U.S. senator

==== Eliminated in primary ====
- Larry Holmquist, candidate for U.S. Senate in 2016
- Sharon Hudson, activist
- Paul Wright, former North Carolina Superior Court judge, perennial candidate, and candidate for U.S. Senate in 2016

==== Withdrawn ====
- Sandy Smith, farm owner (running for U.S. House in NC-01)
- Garland Tucker, former CEO and chairman of Triangle Capital

==== Declined ====
- Ted Budd, incumbent U.S. representative for North Carolina's 13th congressional district
- Mark Meadows, former U.S. representative for North Carolina's 11th congressional district
- Mark Walker, incumbent U.S. representative for North Carolina's 6th congressional district

=== Endorsements ===
Thom Tillis

U.S. presidents

- George W. Bush, 43rd president of the United States

U.S. executive branch officials

- John Bolton, former U.S. national security advisor

Organizations

- Susan B. Anthony List

=== Polling ===
Poll source	Date(s) administered	Sample size (Note: Key: A – all adults RV – registered voters LV – likely voters V – unclear)	Margin of error	Sandy Smith	Thom Tillis	Garland Tucker	Mark Walker	Paul Wright	Other	Undecided
High Point University	February 21–28, 2020	247 (LV)	–	–	69%	–	–	8%	8% (Note: Hudson with 8%; Holmquist with 5%)	16%
High Point University	February 21–28, 2020	444 (RV)	–	–	58%	–	–	7%	10% (Note: Holmquist and Hudson with 5%)	26%
Meredith College	February 16–24, 2020	353 (LV)	± 3.0%	–	53%	–	–	5%	6% (Note: Holmquist and Hudson with 3%)	36%
SurveyUSA	February 13–16, 2020	501 (LV)	± 5.0%	–	59%	–	–	3%	8% (Note: Holmquist and Hudson with 4%)	29%
High Point University	January 31 – February 6, 2020	198 (LV)	–	–	62%	–	–	7%	5% (Note: Holmquist with 3%; Hudson with 2%)	27%
High Point University	January 31 – February 6, 2020	400 (RV)	–	–	52%	–	–	6%	5% (Note: Hudson with 3%; Holmquist with 2%)	38%
	December 20, 2019	Smith withdraws from the race; Wright announces his candidacy								
	December 16, 2019	Walker announces he will not run								
Harper Polling/Civitas (R)	December 2–4, 2019	500 (LV)	± 4.38%	11% (Note: If the only candidates were Smith and Tillis)	63%	–	–	–	–	25%
	December 2, 2019	Tucker withdraws from the race								
FOX News	November 10–13, 2019	574 (LV)	± 4.0%	4%	54%	11%	–	–	5% (Note: "None of the above" with 5%; "other" with 0%)	26%
Public Policy Polling	August 19–20, 2019	564 (V)	–	– (Note: If the only candidates were Tillis and Tucker)	38%	31%	–	–	–	31%
Diversified Research (R) (Note: Poll sponsored by the Garland Tucker campaign)	July 8–9, 2019	500 (V)	–	–	40%	30%	–	–	–	30%
WPA Intelligence (R) (Note: Poll conducted by the Club for Growth, a pro-Republican PAC)	May 19–21, 2019	502 (LV)	± 4.5%	2% (Note: Standard VI response)	40%	11%	17%	–	–	30%
WPA Intelligence (R)	May 19–21, 2019	502 (LV)	± 4.5%	2% (Note: Response after pollster addresses respondents with talking points about Tillis)	18%	8%	56%	–	–	16%
	May 6, 2019	Tucker announces his candidacy								
Diversified Research (R)	Months before May, 2019	– (Note: Not yet released)	–	–	63%	7%	–	–	–	30%

Hypothetical polling

with only Thom Tillis and Mark Walker

Poll source	Date(s) administered	Sample size	Margin of error	Thom Tillis	Mark Walker	Undecided
WPA Intelligence (R)	May 19–21, 2019	502 (LV)	± 4.5%	43%	34%	23%
WPA Intelligence (R)	May 19–21, 2019	502 (LV)	± 4.5%	28% (Note: Response after pollster addresses respondents with short biographies for Tillis and Walker)	64%	8%
WPA Intelligence (R)	May 19–21, 2019	502 (LV)	± 4.5%	21% (Note: Response after short biographies and talking points about Tillis)	69%	10%

with Thom Tillis and Generic Republican

Poll source	Date(s) administered	Sample size	Margin of error	Thom Tillis	Generic Republican	Undecided
WPA Intelligence (R)	May 19–21, 2019	502 (LV)	± 4.5%	17%	18%	52% (Note: Listed as "would consider another candidate in a Republican primary")
WPA Intelligence (R)	May 19–21, 2019	502 (LV)	± 4.5%	7%	32%	57%

=== Results ===
Results by county: Tillis: 60–70%; 70–80%; 80–90%

Republican primary results
Party	Candidate	Votes	%
Republican	Thom Tillis (incumbent)	608,943	78.08%
Republican	Paul Wright	58,908	7.55%
Republican	Larry Holmquist	57,356	7.35%
Republican	Sharon Y. Hudson	54,651	7.01%
Total votes		779,858	100.00%

== Democratic primary ==
=== Candidates ===
==== Nominee ====
- Cal Cunningham, former state senator and candidate for the U.S. Senate in 2010

==== Eliminated in primary ====
- Trevor Fuller, Mecklenburg County commissioner
- Atul Goel, physician and former United States Air Force officer
- Erica D. Smith, state senator
- Steve Swenson

==== Withdrawn ====
- Katherine Bell-Moore
- Eva F. Lee, attorney (running for North Carolina commissioner of leabor)
- Eric L. Mansfield, former state senator
- Steve Williams

==== Declined ====
- Janet Cowell, former North Carolina state treasurer (endorsed Cunningham)
- Anthony Foxx, former U.S. secretary of transportation and former mayor of Charlotte (endorsed Cunningham)
- Rachel Hunt, state representative, and daughter of former governor and 1984 Democratic Senate nominee Jim Hunt
- Vi Lyles, mayor of Charlotte
- Dan McCready, former U.S. Marine, businessman, and nominee for North Carolina's 9th congressional district in 2018 and 2019 special election
- Deborah K. Ross, former state representative and nominee for U.S. Senate in 2016 (running for North Carolina's 2nd congressional district)
- Thomas W. Ross, former president of the University of North Carolina system
- Josh Stein, North Carolina attorney general (running for reelection)
- Brian Turner, state representative

=== Endorsements ===
Cal Cunningham

Federal officials

- Sherrod Brown, U.S. senator (OH)
- Bob Casey Jr., U.S. senator (PA)
- Kay Hagan, former U.S. senator (NC) (2009–2015) (deceased)
- Tim Kaine, U.S. senator (VA)
- Amy Klobuchar, U.S. senator (MN)

State officials

- Howard Nathaniel Lee, former North Carolina state senator and former mayor of Chapel Hill

Local officials

- Harvey Gantt, former mayor of Charlotte and Democratic nominee in 1990 and 1996 U.S. Senate elections

Organizations

- Brady Campaign
- Council for a Livable World
- Democratic Senatorial Campaign Committee
- J Street PAC
- National Committee to Preserve Social Security and Medicare
- Replacements, Ltd. PAC

Newspapers

- The Charlotte Observer/The News & Observer
- The Charlotte Post
- Indy Week (also endorsed Erica D. Smith)

Individuals

- Alex Hirsch, writer, artist, and animator
Erica D. Smith

Federal officials

- Eva Clayton, former U.S. representative from North Carolina's 1st district and assistant director-general of the Food and Agriculture Organization of the United Nations

State officials

- Linda Coleman, former North Carolina state representative, 2012 and 2016 lieutenant governor Democratic nominee, and 2018 Democratic nominee to North Carolina's 2nd congressional district
- Mickey Michaux, North Carolina state senator

Newspapers

- Indy Week (also endorsed Cal Cunningham)

Organizations

- Equality North Carolina

=== Polling ===
Poll source	Date(s) administered	Sample size	Margin of error	Cal Cunningham	Trevor Fuller	Atul Goel	Erica Smith	Steve Swenson	Undecided
High Point University	February 21–28, 2020	274 (LV)	–	50%	4%	1%	24%	3%	18%
High Point University	February 21–28, 2020	474 (RV)	–	42%	5%	1%	24%	4%	4%
Civitas Institute/Spry Strategies	February 26–27, 2020	587 (LV)	± 4.1%	45%	2%	1%	23%	1%	28%
NBC News/Marist	February 23–27, 2020	568 (LV)	± 5.1%	51%	3%	1%	18%	2%	25%
Public Policy Polling	February 23–24, 2020	852 (LV)	± 3.4%	45%	4%	1%	18%	2%	30%
Meredith College	February 16–24, 2020	429 (LV)	± 3.0%	43%	2%	1%	14%	2%	36%
Civitas Institute/Spry Strategies	February 21–23, 2020	553 (LV)	± 3.8%	48%	1%	0%	21%	1%	29%
SurveyUSA	February 13–16, 2020	698 (LV)	± 4.9%	42%	3%	1%	17%	3%	34%
High Point University	January 31 – February 6, 2020	224 (LV)	–	37%	4%	0%	11%	4%	44%
High Point University	January 31 – February 6, 2020	397 (RV)	–	29%	5%	1%	10%	5%	50%
Public Policy Polling	February 4–5, 2020	604 (LV)	–	29%	3%	2%	10%	4%	52%
Public Policy Polling	January 10–12, 2020	509 (LV)	–	22%	2%	3%	12%	1%	60%
FOX News	November 10–13, 2019	669 (RV)	± 4.0%	13%	10%	–	18%	–	49%

=== Results ===
Results by county: Cunningham: 40–50%; 50–60%; 60–70%; 70–80%; Smith: 40–50%; 50–60%; 60–70%; 70–80%

Democratic primary results
Party	Candidate	Votes	%
Democratic	Cal Cunningham	717,941	56.93%
Democratic	Erica D. Smith	438,969	34.81%
Democratic	Trevor M. Fuller	48,168	3.82%
Democratic	Steve Swenson	33,741	2.68%
Democratic	Atul Goel	22,226	1.76%
Total votes		1,261,045	100.00%

== Other candidates ==
=== Libertarian Party ===
==== Nominee ====
- Shannon Bray, U.S. Navy veteran, author, and candidate for North Carolina's 3rd congressional district in 2019

=== Constitution Party ===
==== Nominee ====
- Kevin E. Hayes, candidate for the North Carolina House of Representatives in 2012 and 2018

=== Independence Party ===
==== Withdrawn ====
- Jeremy Thomas

=== Independent write-in candidates ===
==== Withdrawn ====
- Marcia Abrams
- Lee Brian
- Matthew Cisneros
- Michelle Parks
- Sunita Singh

== General election ==
=== Campaign ===
During the Democratic primary, a Republican-funded Super PAC spent $3 million on ads attacking Cunningham and promoting left-wing rival Erica D. Smith.

Cunningham and Tillis participated in debates on September 13, September 22, and October 1.

In July, Tillis claimed Cunningham had been "silent" on the issue of defunding the police, saying, "I assume [his] silence is ...consent". In reality, Cunningham had spoken publicly about the issue and written an op-ed a month earlier stating his opposition to defunding the police, advocating police reform instead.

On October 3, the New York Times wrote that the race had fallen into "utter mayhem" within a period of a few hours after Tillis tested positive for COVID-19 and Cunningham admitted to exchanging sexual text messages with a woman who was not his wife, damaging an image that leaned heavily on his character and military service. Days later, the woman stated that she had had a consensual physical relationship with Cunningham in 2020. The Army Reserve started an investigation into Cunningham. The husband of the woman who stated that she had had an affair with Cunningham, himself an Army veteran, called on Cunningham to drop out of the Senate race. Asked repeatedly whether he had had other extramarital affairs, Cunningham declined to answer.

Tillis's diagnosis, which came after an outbreak at a White House ceremony for Supreme Court nominee Amy Coney Barrett, temporarily threw Barrett's confirmation into jeopardy, as two Republican senators had already stated their intention to vote against (though one of them would eventually vote in favor of her confirmation).

=== Predictions ===
Source	Ranking	As of
538	Lean D (flip)	November 2, 2020
Economist	Lean D (flip)	November 2, 2020
Daily Kos	Tossup	October 30, 2020
DDHQ	Lean D (flip)	November 3, 2020
Inside Elections	Tilt D (flip)	October 28, 2020
Sabato's Crystal Ball	Lean D (flip)	November 2, 2020
RCP	Tossup	October 23, 2020
The Cook Political Report	Tossup	October 29, 2020
Politico	Tossup	November 2, 2020

=== Post-primary endorsements ===
Thom Tillis (R)

U.S. presidents

- Donald Trump, 45th president of the United States

U.S. executive branch officials

- Nikki Haley, former ambassador to the United Nations and former governor of South Carolina

Organizations

- Campaign for Working Families
- Huck PAC
- National Right to Life
- NRA Political Victory Fund
- Republican Jewish Coalition
Cal Cunningham (D)

U.S. presidents

- Barack Obama, 44th president of the United States

U.S. senators, representatives, and federal officials

- Alma Adams, U.S. representative from North Carolina's 12th congressional district
- G. K. Butterfield, U.S. representative from North Carolina's 1st congressional district
- Seth Moulton, U.S. representative from Massachusetts's 6th congressional district
- David Price, U.S. representative from North Carolina's 4th congressional district

State officials

- Stacey Abrams, former minority leader of the Georgia House of Representatives and Democratic nominee in 2018 Georgia gubernatorial election
- Linda Coleman, former North Carolina state representative, 2012 and 2016 lieutenant governor Democratic nominee, and 2018 Democratic nominee to North Carolina's 2nd congressional district

Local officials

- Pete Buttigieg, former mayor of South Bend, Indiana, and former 2020 presidential candidate

Organizations

- Bend the Arc: Jewish Action
- Black Economic Alliance
- Center for Biological Diversity
- Communications Workers of America
- End Citizens United
- Equality NC
- Everytown for Gun Safety
- Feminist Majority PAC
- Giffords
- Human Rights Campaign
- Indivisible District 9
- Joint Action Committee for Political Affairs
- League of Conservation Voters
- NARAL
- National Education Association
- National Organization for Women
- Natural Resources Defense Council
- North Carolina State AFL-CIO
- Patriotic Millionaires
- Planned Parenthood Action Fund
- Sierra Club
- United Auto Workers
- VoteVets.org

=== Fundraising ===
In the first quarter of 2020, Cunningham outraised Tillis for the first time, receiving $4.4 million compared to the $2.1 million Tillis raised. Tillis's prior fundraising, however, left him with the advantage in cash on hand, with $6.5 million in the bank, compared to Cunningham's $3 million.

=== Polling ===
==== Graphical summary ====
View source data.

==== Aggregate polls ====
Cal Cunningham vs. Thom Tillis
Source of poll aggregation	Dates administered	Dates updated	Cal Cunningham	Thom Tillis	Other/Undecided (Note: Calculated by taking the difference of 100% and all other candidates combined.)	Margin
270 to Win	November 2, 2020	November 3, 2020	47.0%	44.2%	8.8%	Cunningham +2.8%
Real Clear Politics	November 1, 2020	November 3, 2020	47.6%	45.0%	7.4%	Cunningham +2.6%

==== Tillis vs. Cunningham ====
Poll source	Date(s) administered	Sample size	Margin of error	Thom Tillis (R)	Cal Cunningham (D)	Shannon Bray (L)	Other / Undecided
Change Research/CNBC	October 29 – November 1, 2020	473 (LV)	± 4.51%	46%	50%	–	5% (Note: "Refused" with 2%; Did not vote, would not vote and Undecided with 1%)
Swayable	October 27 – November 1, 2020	619 (LV)	± 5.6%	47%	53%	–	–
Ipsos/Reuters	October 27 – November 1, 2020	707 (LV)	± 4.2%	46%	48%	–	6% (Note: "Some other candidate" with 4%; would not vote with 0%; "Undecided/Refused" with 2%)
Data for Progress	October 27 – November 1, 2020	908 (LV)	± 3.3%	46%	51%	1%	1% (Note: Hayes (C) with 1%; "Other candidate or write-in" with 0%)
Frederick Polls (Note: Compete Everywhere primarily supports Democratic candidates)	October 30–31, 2020	676 (LV)	± 3.7%	46%	50%	3%	2% (Note: Hayes (C) with 2%)
Emerson College	October 29–31, 2020	855 (LV)	± 3.3%	47% (Note: With voters who lean towards a given candidate)	50%	–	2% (Note: "Someone else" with 2%)
Morning Consult	October 22–31, 2020	1,982 (LV)	± 2%	43%	47%	–	–
CNN/SSRS	October 23–30, 2020	901 (LV)	± 4%	44%	47%	2%	5% (Note: Hayes (C) and Undecided with 2%; "None of these" with 1%; "Other" with 0%)
Pulse Opinion Research/Rasmussen Reports	October 28–29, 2020	800 (LV)	± 3.5%	44%	47%	–	9% (Note: "Some other candidate" with 3%; Undecided with 6%)
East Carolina University	October 27–28, 2020	1,103 (LV)	± 3.4%	46%	48%	–	5% (Note: "Some other candidate" with 3%; "Refused" with 2%; Did/would not vote with 0%; Undecided with no voters)
Cardinal Point Analytics (R)	October 27–28, 2020	750 (LV)	± 3.6%	46%	41%	6%	7% (Note: Hayes (C) with 2%; Undecided with 6%)
Marist College/NBC	October 25–28, 2020	800 (LV)	± 4.7%	43%	53%	–	4% (Note: "Other" and Undecided with 2%)
Gravis Marketing	October 26–27, 2020	614 (LV)	± 4%	44%	46%	–	9% (Note: Undecided with 9%)
Public Policy Polling (D) (Note: Poll sponsored by Protect Our Care, a pro-Affordable Care Act organization.)	October 26–27, 2020	937 (V)	± 3.2%	44%	47%	–	9%
Meeting Street Insights/Carolina Partnership for Reform (R)	October 24–27, 2020	600 (LV)	± 4%	43%	47%	–	–
Siena College/NYT Upshot	October 23–27, 2020	1,034 (LV)	± 3.4%	43%	46%	2%	9% (Note: Would not vote with 2%; Hayes (C) with 1%; "Someone else" with 0%; "Undecided/Refused" with 6%)
Ipsos/Reuters	October 21–27, 2020	647 (LV)	± 4.4%	47%	48%	–	4% (Note: "Some other candidate" with 3%; would not vote with 0%; "Undecided/Refused" with 1%)
RMG Research (Note: Archived November 1, 2020, at the Wayback Machine)	October 24–26, 2020	800 (LV)	± 3.5%	42%	49%	–	9% (Note: "Someoene else" with 4%; Undecided with 5%)
RMG Research	October 24–26, 2020	800 (LV)	± 3.5%	40% (Note: Results generated with high Democratic turnout model)	51%	–	9%
RMG Research	October 24–26, 2020	800 (LV)	± 3.5%	43% (Note: Results generated with high Republican turnout model)	48%	–	9%
Swayable	October 23–26, 2020	363 (LV)	± 7.1%	50%	50%	–	–
SurveyUSA	October 23–26, 2020	627 (LV)	± 4.9%	45%	48%	–	7% (Note: "Other" with 3%; Undecided with 4%)
YouGov/UMass Lowell	October 20–26, 2020	911 (LV)	± 4.2%	45%	49%	–	7% (Note: Did not vote with 1%; "Another candidate" with no voters; Undecided with 6%)
Harper Polling/Civitas (R)	October 22–25, 2020	504 (LV)	± 4.37%	43%	46%	2%	8% (Note: Hays (C) with 1%; Undecided with 7%)
YouGov/CBS	October 20–23, 2020	1,022 (LV)	± 4.1%	43%	49%	–	8% (Note: "Someone else" with 3%; Undecided with 5%)
Trafalgar Group	October 20–22, 2020	1,098 (LV)	± 2.89%	49%	47%	2%	2% (Note: Hayes (C) with 1%; Undecided with 2%)
Pulse Opinion Research/Rasmussen Reports	October 20–21, 2020	800 (LV)	± 3.5%	45%	45%	–	10% (Note: "Some other candidate" with 4%; Undecided with 6%)
Citizen Data	October 17–20, 2020	1,000 (LV)	± 3.1%	42%	48%	–	9% (Note: "Other" with 3%; Undecided with 6%)
Ipsos/Reuters	October 14–20, 2020	660 (LV)	± 4.3%	47%	47%	–	6% (Note: "Some other candidate" and "Undecided/Refused" with 3%; would not vote with 0%)
Morning Consult	October 11–20, 2020	1,904 (LV)	± 2.2%	42%	48%	–	–
Meredith College	October 16–19, 2020	732 (LV)	± 3.5%	38%	43%	4%	15% (Note: Hayes (C) with 1%; Undecided with 14%)
Change Research/CNBC	October 16–19, 2020	521 (LV) (Note: Additional data sourced from FiveThirtyEight)	–	45%	51%	–	–
Data for Progress (D)	October 15–18, 2020	929 (LV)	± 3.2%	42%	46%	1%	11% (Note: Hayes (C) with 1%; Undecided with 10%)
East Carolina University	October 15–18, 2020	1,155 (LV)	± 3.4%	47%	48%	–	5% (Note: Did/would not vote and "Some other candidate" with 1%; "Refused" with 0%; Undecided with 3%)
ABC/Washington Post	October 12–17, 2020	646 (LV)	± 4.5%	47%	49%	–	4% (Note: "Neither" with 1%; "Other" and would not vote with 0%; Undecided with 3%)
Emerson College	October 13–14, 2020	721 (LV)	± 3.6%	44%	45%	–	12% (Note: Undecided with 12%)
Civiqs/Daily Kos	October 11–14, 2020	1,211 (LV)	± 3.3%	45%	51%	2%	3% (Note: Hayes (C) with 1%; "Someone else" with 0%; Undecided with 2%)
Siena College/NYT Upshot	October 9–13, 2020	627 (LV)	± 4.5%	37%	41%	4%	19% (Note: Hayes (C) with 3%; would not vote with 1%; "Someone else" with 0%; "Undecided/Refused" with 15%)
Ipsos/Reuters	October 7–13, 2020	660 (LV)	± 4.3%	42%	46%	–	12% (Note: "Some other candidate" with 5%; would not vote with 0%; "Undecided/Refused" with 7%)
Monmouth University	October 8–11, 2020	500 (RV)	± 4.4%	44%	48%	3%	4% (Note: "No one" with 1%; Hayes (C) with 0%; "Other candidate" with no voters; Undecided with 3%)
Monmouth University	October 8–11, 2020	500 (LV) (Note: With a likely voter turnout model featuring high turnout)	± 4.4%	44%	49%	–	6% (Note: "Other" and Undecided with 3%)
Monmouth University	October 8–11, 2020	500 (LV) (Note: With a likely voter turnout model featuring low turnout)	± 4.4%	47%	48%	–	4%
SurveyUSA	October 8–11, 2020	669 (LV)	± 4.8%	39%	49%	–	11% (Note: "Some other candidate" with 3%; Undecided with 8%)
Susquehanna Polling & Research Inc. (R) (Note: Poll sponsored by The American Greatness PAC, which is pro-Trump.)	October 7–11, 2020	500 (LV)	± 4.3%	44%	46%	–	9% (Note: "Other" and "Refused" with 1%; Undecided with 7%)
RMG Research (Note: Archived October 14, 2020, at the Wayback Machine)	October 7–11, 2020	800 (LV)	–	36%	46%	4%	15% (Note: "Some other candidate" with 3%; Undecided with 12%)
Morning Consult	October 2–11, 2020	1,993 (LV)	± 2.2%	41%	47%	–	–
Ipsos/Reuters	September 29 – October 6, 2020	693 (LV)	± 4.2%	42%	47%	–	11% (Note: "Some other candidate" with 4%; would not vote with 0%; "Undecided/Refused" with 7%)
Public Policy Polling	October 4–5, 2020	911 (V)	± 3.3%	42%	48%	–	11% (Note: Undecided with 11%)
Data For Progress (D)	September 30 – October 5, 2020	1,285 (LV)	± 2.7%	39%	50%	2%	9% (Note: Hayes (C) with 1%; Undecided with 8%)
Change Research/CNBC	October 2–4, 2020	396 (LV)	–	46%	50%	–	4% (Note: Would not vote with 1%; Undecided with 3%)
East Carolina University	October 2–4, 2020	1,232 (LV)	± 3.2%	47%	46%	–	7% (Note: "Some other candidate" with 3%; "Refused" and would not vote with 1%; Undecided with 2%)
ALG Research (D) (Note: Poll sponsored by Piedmont Rising, a pro-Affordable Care Act organization.)	September 22–28, 2020	822 (V)	–	41%	53%	–	–
Hart Research Associates (D) (Note: Poll sponsored by The Human Rights Campaign, which has endorsed Biden prior to this poll's sampling period.)	September 24–27, 2020	400 (LV)	± 4.9%	41%	54%	–	–
YouGov/CBS	September 22–25, 2020	1,213 (LV)	± 3.6%	38%	48%	–	14% (Note: "Someone else" with 3%; Undecided with 11%)
YouGov/UMass Lowell	September 18–25, 2020	921 (LV)	± 4.1%	43%	49%	–	8% (Note: "Another candidate" with 1%; Undecided with 7%)
Meredith College	September 18–22, 2020	705 (RV)	± 3.5%	42%	43%	4%	13% (Note: Hayes (C) with 1%; Undecided with 12%)
Change Research/CNBC	September 18–20, 2020	579 (LV)	–	43%	48%	–	9% (Note: Would not vote with 2%; "Don't recall" with 0%; Undecided with 7%)
Harper Polling/Civitas (R)	September 17–20, 2020	612 (LV)	± 3.96%	38%	44%	3%	15% (Note: Bray (L) with 2%; Undecided with 13%)
Morning Consult	September 11–20, 2020	1,604 (LV)	± (2% – 7%)	38% (Note: Overlapping sample with the previous Morning Consult poll, but more information available regarding sample size)	47%	–	–
Emerson College	September 16–18, 2020	717 (LV)	± 3.6%	43%	49%	–	8% (Note: Undecided with 8%)
Morning Consult	September 8–17, 2020	1,664 (LV)	± (2% – 4%)	39%	46%	–	–
Ipsos/Reuters	September 11–16, 2020	586 (LV)	± 4.6%	44%	48%	–	9% (Note: "Some other candidate" with 2%; would not vote with 1%; Undecided with 6%)
Siena College/NYT Upshot	September 11–16, 2020	653 (LV)	± 4.3%	37%	42%	2%	19% (Note: Hayes (C), "Someone else" and would not vote with 1%; "Undecided/Refused" with 16%)
Redfield & Wilton Strategies	September 12–15, 2020	1,092 (LV)	± 2.97%	38%	49%	–	13% (Note: "Another Third Party/Write-in" with 4%; Undecided with 9%)
Suffolk University	September 10–14, 2020	500 (LV)	± 4.4%	38%	42%	6%	15% (Note: Bray (L) with 6%; Hayes (C) and "Other" with 2%; "Refused" with 0%; Undecided with 11%)
SurveyUSA	September 10–13, 2020	596 (LV)	± 5.6%	40%	47%	–	13% (Note: "Another candidate" with 3%; Undecided with 10%)
CNN/SSRS	September 9–13, 2020	787 (LV)	± 4.4%	46%	47%	3%	4% (Note: Hayes (C) with 1%; "None of these" and "Other" with no voters; Undecided with 3%)
CNN/SSRS	September 9–13, 2020	893 (RV)	± 4.1%	44%	46%	4%	6% (Note: Hayes (C) with 1%; "None of these" and "Other" with 0%; Undecided with 5%)
Kaiser Family Foundation/Cook Political Report	August 29 – September 13, 2020	1,116 (RV)	–	37%	41%	–	22% (Note: "Neither/Another Party" with 3%; "Undecided/Don't know/Refused" with 19%)
The Trafalgar Group (R)	September 9–11, 2020	1,046 (LV)	± 3.0%	45%	46%	3%	6% (Note: Hayes (C) with 1%; Undecided with 5%)
Rasmussen Reports/Pulse Opinion Research	September 7–8, 2020	1,000 (LV)	± 3.0%	44%	47%	–	10% (Note: "Another candidate" with 3%; Undecided with 7%)
Benenson Strategy Group/GS Strategy Group (Note: Poll sponsored by AARP.)	August 8 – September 8, 2020	1,600 (LV)	± 2.5%	39%	42%	5%	13% (Note: Hayes with 1%; "Someone else" with 0%; Undecided with 12%)
Change Research/CNBC	September 4–6, 2020	442 (LV)	± 4.6%	44%	51%	–	5% (Note: Would not vote with 1%; Undecided with 4%)
Redfield & Wilton Strategies	August 30 – September 3, 2020	951 (LV)	± 3.2%	37%	47%	–	16% (Note: "Another Third Party/Write-in" with 3%; Undecided with 13%)
Monmouth University	August 29 – September 1, 2020	401 (RV)	± 4.9%	45%	46%	2%	7% (Note: Hayes (C) and "No one" with 1%; "Other candidate" with <1%; Undecided with 5%)
Monmouth University	August 29 – September 1, 2020	401 (LV) (Note: With a likely voter turnout model featuring higher turnout than in the 2016 presidential election)	± 4.9%	45%	47%	–	8% (Note: "Other" and Undecided with 4%)
Monmouth University	August 29 – September 1, 2020	401 (LV) (Note: With a likely voter turnout model featuring lower turnout than in the 2016 presidential election)	± 4.9%	46%	46%	–	8%
FOX News	August 29 – September 1, 2020	722 (LV)	± 3.5%	42%	48%	3%	8% (Note: Hayes (C), "Other" and would not vote with 1%; Undecided with 5%)
FOX News	August 29 – September 1, 2020	804 (RV)	± 3.5%	40%	47%	3%	10% (Note: Hayes (C) with 2%; "Other" and would not vote with 1%; Undecided with 6%)
East Carolina University	August 29–30, 2020	1,101 (LV)	± 3.4%	44%	44%	–	12% (Note: "Some other candidate" with 3%; Would not vote with 0%; Undecided with 9%)
Change Research/CNBC	August 21–23, 2020	560 (LV)	± 3.6%	42%	52%	–	6% (Note: Would not vote with 1%; Undecided with 5%)
Morning Consult	August 14–23, 2020	1,541 (LV)	± 2.0%	39%	47%	–	14%
Redfield and Wilton Strategies	August 16–18, 2020	856 (LV)	± 3.4%	38%	47%	–	16% (Note: "Third party/write-in" with 3%; Undecided with 13%)
East Carolina University	August 12–13, 2020	1,255 (RV)	± 3.2%	40%	44%	–	16% (Note: "Some other candidate" with 5%; would not vote with 1%; Undecided with 10%)
Emerson College	August 8–10, 2020	673 (LV)	± 3.8%	42%	44%	–	14% (Note: Undecided with 14%)
Harper Polling/Civitas (R)	August 6–10, 2020	600 (LV)	± 4.0%	38%	41%	2%	18% (Note: Hayes (C) with 2%; Undecided with 16%)
Change Research/CNBC	August 7–9, 2020	491 (LV)	± 4.4%	43%	48%	–	10% (Note: Would not vote with 2%; Undecided with 8%)
Public Policy Polling (D) (Note: This poll's sponsor had endorsed Cunningham prior to the sampling period)	July 30–31, 2020	934 (V)	± 3.2%	44%	48%	–	8%
Data for Progress	July 24 – August 2, 2020	1,170 (LV)	± 3.2%	41%	49%	–	10% (Note: "No one" with 10%)
YouGov/CBS	July 28–31, 2020	1,121 (LV)	± 3.8%	39%	48%	–	12% (Note: "Someone else" with 3%; Undecided with 9%)
HIT Strategies (D) (Note: This poll’s sponsor, DFER, primarily supports Democratic candidates)	July 23–31, 2020	400 (RV)	± 4.9%	32%	48%	–	21% (Note: "Third party candidate" with 4%; would not vote with 2%; Undecided with 15%)
Change Research/CNBC	July 24–26, 2020	284 (LV)	± 5.6%	40%	52%	–	8%
Morning Consult	July 17–26, 2020	1,504 (LV)	± 3.0%	37%	46%	–	17%
Cardinal Point Analytics (R) (Note: Archived July 30, 2020, at the Wayback Machine)	July 22–24, 2020	735 (LV)	± 3.6%	43%	43%	1%	13% (Note: Hayes (C) with 2%; Undecided with 11%)
Public Policy Polling	July 22–23, 2020	939 (V)	± 3.2%	40%	48%	–	13% (Note: Undecided with 13%)
Redfield & Wilton Strategies	July 19–23, 2020	919 (LV)	± 3.2%	36%	47%	–	16% (Note: "Third party/write-in" with 2%; Undecided with 14%)
Marist College/NBC News	July 14–22, 2020	882 (RV)	± 4.0%	41%	50%	–	10% (Note: "Other" with 1%; Undecided with 9%)
Spry Strategies (R) (Note: This poll's sponsor is the American Principles Project, a 501 that supports the Republican Party.)	July 11–16, 2020	750 (LV)	± 3.5%	40%	40%	–	20% (Note: "Another candidate" with 6%; Undecided with 13%)
Cardinal Point Analytics (R)	July 13–15, 2020	547 (LV)	± 4.2%	44%	47%	1%	7% (Note: Hayes (C) with 1%; Undecided with 6%)
Change Research/CNBC	July 10–12, 2020	655 (LV)	± 3.8%	42%	49%	–	9% (Note: Undecided with 7%; would not vote with 2%)
Public Policy Polling	July 7–8, 2020	818 (V)	± 3.4%	39%	47%	–	15% (Note: Undecided with 15%)
Change Research/CNBC	June 26–28, 2020	468 (LV)	± 3.9%	41%	51%	–	8% (Note: Undecided with 7%; would not vote with 1%)
East Carolina University	June 22–25, 2020	1,149 (RV)	± 3.4%	41%	41%	–	18% (Note: Undecided with 10%; "Some other candidate" with 8%)
Public Policy Polling	June 22–23, 2020	1,157 (V)	± 2.9%	40%	44%	–	16% (Note: Undecided with 16%)
FOX News	June 20–23, 2020	1,012 (RV)	± 3.0%	37%	39%	3%	20% (Note: Undecided with 15%; Hayes (C) with 3%; "other" and would not vote with 1%)
NYT Upshot/Siena College	June 8–18, 2020	653 (RV)	± 4.1%	39%	42%	–	19% (Note: Undecided with 17%; "Another candidate" and would not vote with 1%)
Gravis Marketing (R) (Note: Polling was sponsored by OANN.)	June 17, 2020	631 (RV)	± 3.9%	46%	45%	–	9%
Redfield & Wilton Strategies	June 14–17, 2020	902 (LV)	± 3.3%	36%	45%	–	19% (Note: Undecided with 16%; "Another third party/write in" with 3%)
Public Policy Polling	June 2–3, 2020	913 (V)	± 3.2%	41%	43%	–	16%
Harper Polling/Civitas (R)	May 26–28, 2020	500 (LV)	± 4.4%	38%	36%	3%	24% (Note: Hayes (C) with 2%; Undecided with 21%)
Meeting Street Insights (R) (Note: Archived June 5, 2020, at the Wayback Machine)	May 9–13, 2020	500 (RV)	± 3.8%	44%	46%	–	8%
East Carolina University	May 7–9, 2020	1,111 (RV)	± 3.4%	40%	41%	–	19% (Note: Undecided with 11%; "other candidate" with 8%)
Civiqs/Daily Kos (D)	May 2–4, 2020	1,362 (RV)	± 3.0%	41%	50%	–	9% (Note: Undecided with 5%; "Someone else" with 4%)
Meredith College	April 27–28, 2020	604 (RV)	± 4.0%	34%	44%	–	22%
SurveyUSA	April 23–26, 2020	580 (LV)	± 5.5%	39%	41%	–	20% (Note: Undecided with 20%)
Public Policy Polling	April 14–15, 2020	1,318 (LV)	± 3.4%	40%	47%	–	13%
Harper Polling/Civitas (R)	April 5–7, 2020	500 (LV)	± 4.4%	38%	34%	–	28%
East Carolina University	February 27–28, 2020	1,288 (RV)	± 3.2%	44%	42%	–	14%
NBC News/Marist	February 23–27, 2020	2,120 (RV)	± 2.6%	43%	48%	–	9%
Public Policy Polling (Note: Poll sponsored by private client)	February 25–26, 2020	911 (RV)	–	41%	46%	–	13%
Public Opinion Strategies (R) (Note: Internal poll)	January 11–15, 2020	800 (LV)	± 3.5%	48%	44%	–	8%
ALG Research (D) (Note: Poll sponsored by End Citizens United, an organization that has exclusively endorsed Democratic candidates)	January 8–13, 2020	700 (LV)	–	42%	44%	–	13%
Meredith College	September 29 – October 7, 2019	996 (RV)	± 3%	33%	33%	–	32%
Public Policy Polling (D)	September 16–17, 2019	628 (V)	± 3.9%	43%	45%	–	12%
Fabrizio Ward	July 29–31, 2019	600 (LV)	± 4.0%	41%	42%	–	17%
Public Policy Polling (Note: Poll sponsored by VoteVets.org)	June 17–18, 2019	610 (RV)	± 4.0%	40%	41%	–	19%

Hypothetical polling

with Erica D. Smith

Poll source	Date(s) administered	Sample size	Margin of error	Thom Tillis (R)	Erica D. Smith (D)	Undecided
Meredith College	September 29 – October 7, 2019	996 (RV)	± 3%	33%	34%	17%
Emerson College	May 31 – June 3, 2019	932 (RV)	± 3.1%	39%	46%	15%

with Generic Democrat

Poll source	Date(s) administered	Sample size	Margin of error	Thom Tillis (R)	Generic Democrat	Undecided
Public Policy Polling (D) (Note: Poll sponsored by Save My Care, a pro-Affordable Care Act organization)	June 30 – July 1, 2017	1,102 (V)	± 3.6%	44%	48%	8%

with Thom Tillis and Generic Opponent

Poll source	Date(s) administered	Sample size	Margin of error	Thom Tillis (R)	Generic Opponent	Other	Undecided
Fabrizio Ward	July 29–31, 2019	600 (LV)	± 4.0%	26%	52% (Note: "It is time to give a new person a chance to do better" with 50% as opposed to "Thillis has performed his job as U.S. Senator well enough to deserve re-election")	3% (Note: "Refused" with 3%)	19%

with Generic Republican and Generic Democrat

Poll source	Date(s) administered	Sample size	Margin of error	Generic Republican	Generic Democrat	Other/Undecided
Ipsos/Reuters	September 11–16, 2020	586 (LV)	± 4.6%	47%	48%	5% (Note: "Prefer not to answer/Refused" with 4%; "Candidate from another political party" with 1%; "Will not vote/not sure" with 0%)
Siena College/NYT Upshot	September 11–16, 2020	653 (LV)	± 4.3%	48%	44%	8% (Note: "Undecided/Refused" with 8%)
Emerson College	August 8–10, 2020	673 (LV)	± 3.8%	45%	44%	11%
Harper Polling/Civitas (R)	August 6–10, 2020	600 (LV)	± 4%	42%	43%	16% (Note: "Neither" and "Other Party" with 1%; Undecided with 14%)
Harper Polling/Civitas (R)	May 26–28, 2020	500 (LV)	± 4.38%	43%	40%	17% (Note: Undecided with 14%; "Neither/other/independent" with 3%)
Harper Polling/Civitas (R)	April 5–7, 2020	500 (LV)	± 4.4%	41%	42%	17%
Harper Polling/Civitas (R)	Released March 17, 2020	–	–	44%	41%	15% (Note: Undecided with 11%; "Neither/other/independent" with 4%)
Climate Nexus	Feb 11–15, 2020	675 (RV)	± 3.9%	43%	46%	11%
Harper Polling/Civitas (R)	Released October 17, 2019	–	–	40%	41%	20% (Note: Undecided with 17%; "Neither/other/independent" with 3%)
Harper Polling/Civitas (R)	Released September 11, 2019	–	–	37%	42%	21% (Note: Undecided with 16%; "Neither/other/independent" with 5%)
Harper Polling/Civitas (R)	Released August 4, 2019	–	–	39%	37%	24% (Note: Undecided with 19%; "Neither/other/independent" with 5%)
Fabrizio Ward	July 29–31, 2019	600 (LV)	± 4.0%	44%	44%	11% (Note: "Undecided" with 8%; "don't know/refused" with 3%)
Harper Polling/Civitas (R)	Released June 10, 2019	–	–	38%	38%	24% (Note: Undecided with 18%; "Neither/other/independent" with 6%)
Harper Polling/Civitas (R)	Released May 5, 2019	–	–	39%	39%	22% (Note: Undecided with 17%; "Neither/other/independent" with 5%)
Harper Polling/Civitas (R)	Released March 17, 2019	–	–	37%	40%	22% (Note: Undecided with 15%; "Neither/other/independent" with 7%)
Harper Polling/Civitas (R)	Released February 13, 2019	–	–	37%	38%	25% (Note: Undecided with 21%; "Neither/other/independent" with 4%)

=== Results ===
Like many Republican Senate candidates in 2020, Tillis did much better on Election Day than pre-election prediction polling indicated. The senator narrowly defeated Cunningham 48.7 to 46.9 and slightly outperformed Donald Trump in terms of margin of victory. Tillis's upset victory has been largely attributed to Cunningham's response to his alleged affair, as well as Tillis's fierce campaigning during the last few weeks of the race.

2020 United States Senate election in North Carolina
Party	Candidate	Votes	%	±%
Republican	Thom Tillis (incumbent)	2,665,598	48.69%	−0.13%
Democratic	Cal Cunningham	2,569,965	46.94%	−0.32%
Libertarian	Shannon Bray	171,571	3.13%	−0.61%
Constitution	Kevin E. Hayes	67,818	1.24%	N/A
Total votes		5,474,952	100.00%	
Republican hold				

==== By county ====
County	Thom Tillis Republican		Cal Cunningham Democratic		Shannon Bray Libertarian		Kevin Hayes Constitution		Margin		Total votes
County	#	%	#	%	#	%	#	%	#	%	Total votes
Alamance	44,246	51.74	38,038	44.49	2,302	2.69	922	1.08	6,208	7.26	85,508
Alexander	14,739	73.53	4,287	21.39	563	2.81	455	2.27	10,452	52.15	20,044
Alleghany	4,082	67.95	1,587	26.42	192	3.20	146	2.43	2,495	41.53	6,007
Anson	4,981	44.84	5,756	51.82	204	1.84	167	1.50	-775	-6.98	11,108
Ashe	10,619	67.91	4,279	27.37	457	2.92	281	1.80	6,340	40.55	15,636
Avery	6,865	73.65	2,079	22.30	246	2.64	131	1.41	4,786	51.35	9,321
Beaufort	15,448	59.31	9,439	36.24	706	2.71	453	1.74	6,009	23.07	26,046
Bertie	3,597	37.11	5,825	60.09	158	1.63	114	1.18	-2,228	-22.98	9,694
Bladen	8,967	53.12	7,280	43.13	399	2.36	235	1.39	1,687	9.99	16,881
Brunswick	52,971	59.38	32,180	36.08	2,881	3.23	1,170	1.31	20,791	23.31	89,202
Buncombe	60,688	37.92	92,664	57.90	5,054	3.16	1,636	1.02	-31,976	-19.98	160,042
Burke	28,934	65.51	13,108	29.68	1,309	2.96	819	1.85	15,826	35.83	44,170
Cabarrus	61,231	52.74	48,886	42.11	4,261	3.67	1,724	1.48	12,345	10.63	116,102
Caldwell	29,971	70.76	10,288	24.29	1,299	3.07	799	1.89	19,683	46.47	42,357
Camden	4,181	71.62	1,403	24.03	183	3.13	71	1.22	2,778	47.59	5,838
Carteret	28,492	67.47	11,823	28.00	1,312	3.11	601	1.42	16,669	39.47	42,228
Caswell	6,643	55.54	4,916	41.10	278	2.32	124	1.04	1,727	14.44	11,961
Catawba	54,004	65.16	24,845	29.98	2,550	3.08	1,484	1.79	29,159	35.18	82,883
Chatham	21,039	43.52	25,697	53.16	1,171	2.42	431	0.89	-4,658	-9.64	48,338
Cherokee	12,048	73.98	3,589	22.04	408	2.50	241	1.48	8,459	51.94	16,286
Chowan	4,353	56.61	3,124	40.63	139	1.81	73	0.95	1,229	15.98	7,689
Clay	4,897	71.90	1,676	24.61	140	2.05	98	1.44	3,221	47.29	6,811
Cleveland	32,022	63.06	16,752	32.99	1,235	2.43	768	1.51	15,270	30.07	50,777
Columbus	15,563	59.62	9,599	36.77	516	1.98	424	1.62	5,964	22.85	26,102
Craven	29,542	56.25	20,416	38.87	1,772	3.37	791	1.51	9,126	17.38	52,521
Cumberland	57,121	39.20	81,001	55.59	5,379	3.69	2,218	1.52	-23,880	-16.39	145,719
Currituck	11,368	71.29	3,849	24.14	554	3.47	175	1.10	7,519	47.15	15,946
Dare	13,581	56.98	9,284	38.95	766	3.21	204	0.86	4,297	18.03	23,835
Davidson	60,686	68.81	23,660	26.83	2,496	2.83	1,346	1.53	37,026	41.99	88,188
Davie	17,415	69.21	6,570	26.11	781	3.10	396	1.57	10,845	43.10	25,162
Duplin	12,954	57.75	8,689	38.73	477	2.13	312	1.39	4,265	19.01	22,432
Durham	34,152	19.20	138,429	77.40	5,041	2.82	1,224	0.68	-104,277	-58.30	178,846
Edgecombe	8,582	33.90	15,952	63.01	506	2.00	278	1.10	-7,370	-29.11	25,318
Forsyth	83,228	41.72	107,277	53.77	6,533	3.27	2,471	1.24	-24,049	-12.05	199,509
Franklin	19,654	52.94	15,659	42.18	1,246	3.36	565	1.52	3,995	10.76	37,124
Gaston	69,398	60.77	39,595	34.67	3,548	3.11	1,660	1.45	29,803	26.07	114,201
Gates	3,205	54.46	2,474	42.04	132	2.24	74	1.26	731	12.42	5,885
Graham	3,355	73.75	1,013	22.27	94	2.07	87	1.91	2,342	51.48	4,549
Granville	15,687	50.02	14,368	45.82	908	2.90	396	1.26	1,319	4.21	31,359
Greene	4,591	52.78	3,842	44.17	189	2.17	77	0.89	749	8.61	8,699
Guilford	104,908	37.18	165,823	58.77	8,587	3.04	2,819	1.00	-60,915	-21.59	282,137
Halifax	9,446	36.93	15,438	60.36	456	1.78	237	0.93	-5,992	-23.43	25,577
Harnett	33,321	57.57	21,523	37.18	2,128	3.68	911	1.57	11,798	20.38	57,883
Haywood	21,502	59.26	13,113	36.14	1,081	2.98	587	1.62	8,389	23.12	36,283
Henderson	39,359	57.99	25,782	37.99	1,964	2.89	768	1.13	13,577	20.00	67,873
Hertford	3,305	31.80	6,815	65.58	154	1.48	118	1.14	-3,510	-33.78	10,392
Hoke	8,638	40.40	11,466	53.62	909	4.25	370	1.73	-2,828	-13.22	21,383
Hyde	1,315	53.26	1,075	43.54	53	2.15	26	1.05	240	9.72	2,469
Iredell	64,319	63.44	31,893	31.46	3,487	3.44	1,687	1.66	32,426	31.98	101,386
Jackson	10,763	50.68	9,382	44.17	788	3.71	306	1.44	1,381	6.50	21,239
Johnston	64,822	58.82	39,771	36.09	3,953	3.59	1,667	1.51	25,051	22.73	110,213
Jones	3,046	55.85	2,124	38.94	182	3.34	102	1.87	922	16.91	5,454
Lee	15,419	53.70	11,851	41.27	979	3.41	465	1.62	3,568	12.43	28,714
Lenoir	13,898	49.43	13,284	47.24	591	2.10	346	1.23	614	2.18	28,119
Lincoln	34,673	69.66	12,858	25.83	1,482	2.98	763	1.53	21,815	43.83	49,776
Macon	13,408	65.35	6,248	30.45	521	2.54	340	1.66	7,160	34.90	20,517
Madison	7,399	57.17	4,987	38.53	362	2.80	195	1.51	2,412	18.64	12,943
Martin	6,034	48.57	5,973	48.08	257	2.07	160	1.29	61	0.49	12,424
McDowell	15,894	69.87	5,934	26.09	565	2.48	354	1.56	9,960	43.79	22,747
Mecklenburg	186,693	33.18	350,775	62.34	19,764	3.51	5,440	0.97	-164,082	-29.16	562,672
Mitchell	6,735	75.32	1,919	21.46	181	2.02	107	1.20	4,816	53.86	8,942
Montgomery	7,741	60.95	4,379	34.48	324	2.55	256	2.02	3,362	26.47	12,700
Moore	35,682	61.71	19,633	33.95	1,760	3.04	748	1.29	16,049	27.76	57,823
Nash	24,719	47.63	25,474	49.09	1,117	2.15	585	1.13	-755	-1.46	51,895
New Hanover	61,415	47.13	61,702	47.35	5,516	4.23	1,685	1.29	-287	-0.22	130,318
Northampton	3,720	37.16	6,005	59.98	187	1.87	99	0.99	-2,285	-22.82	10,011
Onslow	42,868	60.21	23,344	32.79	3,627	5.09	1,363	1.91	19,524	27.42	71,202
Orange	20,862	24.68	61,214	72.42	1,961	2.32	488	0.58	-40,352	-47.74	84,525
Pamlico	4,589	60.53	2,681	35.36	188	2.48	123	1.62	1,908	25.17	7,581
Pasquotank	9,491	48.31	9,421	47.95	538	2.74	198	1.01	70	0.36	19,648
Pender	20,660	61.20	11,272	33.39	1,274	3.77	553	1.64	9,388	27.81	33,759
Perquimans	4,817	64.87	2,382	32.08	139	1.87	88	1.19	2,435	32.79	7,426
Person	12,192	56.49	8,475	39.27	600	2.78	315	1.46	3,717	17.22	21,582
Pitt	37,947	43.67	45,598	52.47	2,510	2.89	846	0.97	-7,651	-8.80	86,901
Polk	7,394	60.35	4,436	36.21	286	2.33	136	1.11	2,958	24.14	12,252
Randolph	53,357	73.52	15,973	22.01	2,097	2.89	1,143	1.58	37,384	51.51	72,570
Richmond	11,002	53.85	8,510	41.65	566	2.77	352	1.72	2,492	12.20	20,430
Robeson	25,211	54.87	19,135	41.64	955	2.08	648	1.41	6,076	13.22	45,949
Rockingham	28,971	61.23	16,189	34.22	1,473	3.11	680	1.44	12,782	27.02	47,313
Rowan	46,446	63.84	22,615	31.09	2,254	3.10	1,433	1.97	23,831	32.76	72,748
Rutherford	23,596	69.26	9,136	26.82	781	2.29	554	1.63	14,460	42.45	34,067
Sampson	16,521	58.25	10,818	38.15	636	2.24	385	1.36	5,703	20.11	28,360
Scotland	7,066	48.86	6,850	47.37	322	2.23	223	1.54	216	1.49	14,461
Stanly	23,891	71.17	8,045	23.96	961	2.86	674	2.01	15,846	47.20	33,571
Stokes	18,599	72.99	5,611	22.02	812	3.19	458	1.80	12,988	50.97	25,480
Surry	25,475	70.17	9,267	25.53	1,030	2.84	531	1.46	16,208	44.65	36,303
Swain	3,846	55.17	2,696	38.67	298	4.27	131	1.88	1,150	16.50	6,971
Transylvania	11,209	55.48	8,158	40.38	552	2.73	286	1.42	3,051	15.10	20,205
Tyrrell	945	52.97	778	43.61	37	2.07	24	1.35	167	9.36	1,784
Union	79,645	61.34	45,096	34.73	3,765	2.90	1,338	1.03	34,549	26.61	129,844
Vance	7,876	37.84	12,247	58.84	455	2.19	237	1.14	-4,371	-21.00	20,815
Wake	232,388	37.05	367,718	58.63	22,230	3.54	4,893	0.78	-135,330	-21.58	627,229
Warren	3,520	34.30	6,437	62.72	194	1.89	112	1.09	-2,917	-28.42	10,263
Washington	2,584	42.05	3,329	54.17	128	2.08	104	1.69	-745	-12.12	6,145
Watauga	14,216	44.59	16,193	50.80	1,138	3.57	331	1.04	-1,977	-6.20	31,878
Wayne	29,174	53.10	23,528	42.82	1,419	2.58	823	1.50	5,646	10.28	54,944
Wilkes	25,488	72.67	8,074	23.02	924	2.64	587	1.67	17,414	49.65	35,073
Wilson	18,642	46.13	20,445	50.59	885	2.19	439	1.09	-1,803	-4.46	40,411
Yadkin	14,798	74.86	4,036	20.42	553	2.80	381	1.93	10,762	54.44	19,768
Yancey	7,038	62.39	3,833	33.98	250	2.22	159	1.41	3,205	28.41	11,280
Totals	2,665,598	48.69	2,569,965	46.94	171,571	3.13	67,818	1.24	95,633	1.75	5,474,952

Counties that flipped from Democratic to Republican

- Bladen (largest municipality: Elizabethtown)
- Gates (largest municipality: Gatesville)
- Granville (largest municipality: Oxford)
- Hyde (largest municipality: Ocracoke)
- Jackson (largest municipality: Cullowhee)
- Lenoir (largest municipality: Kinston)
- Martin (largest municipality: Williamston)
- Pasquotank (largest municipality: Elizabeth City)
- Richmond (largest municipality: Rockingham)
- Robeson (largest municipality: Lumberton)
- Scotland (largest municipality: Laurinburg)

Counties that flipped from Republican to Democratic

- Nash (largest municipality: Rocky Mount)
- New Hanover (largest municipality: Wilmington)
- Watauga (largest municipality: Boone)

==== By congressional district ====
Tillis won eight of 13 congressional districts.

District	Tillis	Cunningham	Representative
1st	43%	53%	G. K. Butterfield
2nd	35%	60%	George Holding
2nd	35%	60%	Deborah K. Ross
3rd	59%	37%	Greg Murphy
4th	32%	64%	David Price
5th	64%	31%	Virginia Foxx
6th	37%	59%	Mark Walker
6th	37%	59%	Kathy Manning
7th	56%	39%	David Rouzer
8th	50%	44%	Richard Hudson
9th	53%	43%	Dan Bishop
10th	64%	31%	Patrick McHenry
11th	53%	42%	Madison Cawthorn
12th	29%	66%	Alma Adams
13th	64%	32%	Ted Budd

== See also ==
- 2020 North Carolina elections

== Notes ==
Partisan clients

Voter samples and additional candidates
