= Caleb Theodros =

American politician (born 1973)

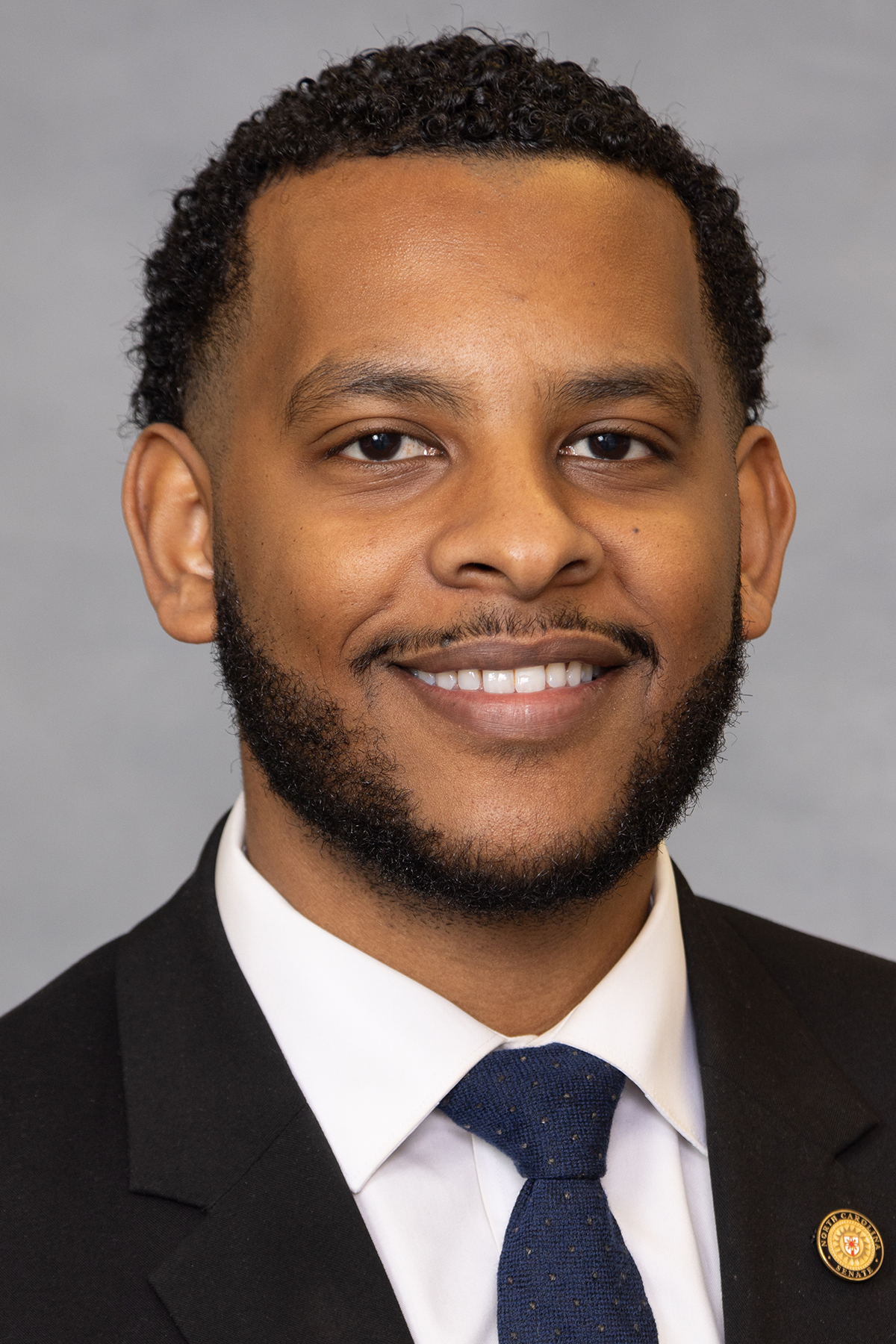

Member of the North Carolina Senate from the 41st district
- Incumbent
- Assumed office January 1, 2025
- Preceded by: Natasha Marcus

Personal details
- Party: Democratic
- Education: University of North Carolina at Charlotte
- Website: Legislative website Campaign website

Caleb Theodros is an American politician serving as a member of the North Carolina State Senate for the 41st district since 2025. The district includes part of Mecklenburg County, stretching from West Charlotte to Plaza-Midwood.

== Early life and education ==
Theodros' family emigrated from Eritrea when he was a child and he grew up in Charlotte, North Carolina. He graduated from Harding University High School then earned a bachelor's degree in economics and political science from the University of North Carolina at Charlotte.

== Career ==
=== 2019 Charlotte City Council campaign ===
In 2019, Theodros ran for the Charlotte City Council in District 3. He placed third in the Democratic primary with 15.2% of the vote, behind Victoria Watlington and Terry M. Brown Jr. respectively.

=== North Carolina Senate ===
Theodros announced his campaign for the North Carolina State Senate for the 41st district, an open seat following redistricting, in 2024. He won the Democratic primary with approximately 43% of the vote. The runner-up, Lucille Puckett, filed a claim with the Mecklenburg County Board of Elections challenging Theodros residency in the district which was unanimously rejected. Theodros also reported to police that a GPS tracker had been placed on his car around this time.

He was unopposed in the general election.

== Electoral history ==
=== 2024 ===
North Carolina Senate 41st district Democratic primary election, 2024
Party	Candidate	Votes	%
Democratic	Caleb Theodros	7,230	42.84%
Democratic	Lucille Puckett	5,268	31.22%
Democratic	Kendrick Cunningham	2,784	16.50%
Democratic	Robert Bruns	1,593	9.44%
Total votes		16,875	100%

North Carolina Senate 41st district general election, 2024
Party	Candidate	Votes	%
Democratic	Caleb Theodros	95,805	100%
Total votes		95,805	100%
Democratic win (new seat)			

=== 2019 ===
Charlotte City Council 3rd district Democratic primary, 2019
Party	Candidate	Votes	%
Democratic	Victoria Watlington	3,322	43.82%
Democratic	Terry M. Brown Jr.	3,105	40.96%
Democratic	Caleb Theodros	1,154	15.22%
Total votes		7,581	100%
