= Ben Clark (politician) =

American politician from North Carolina

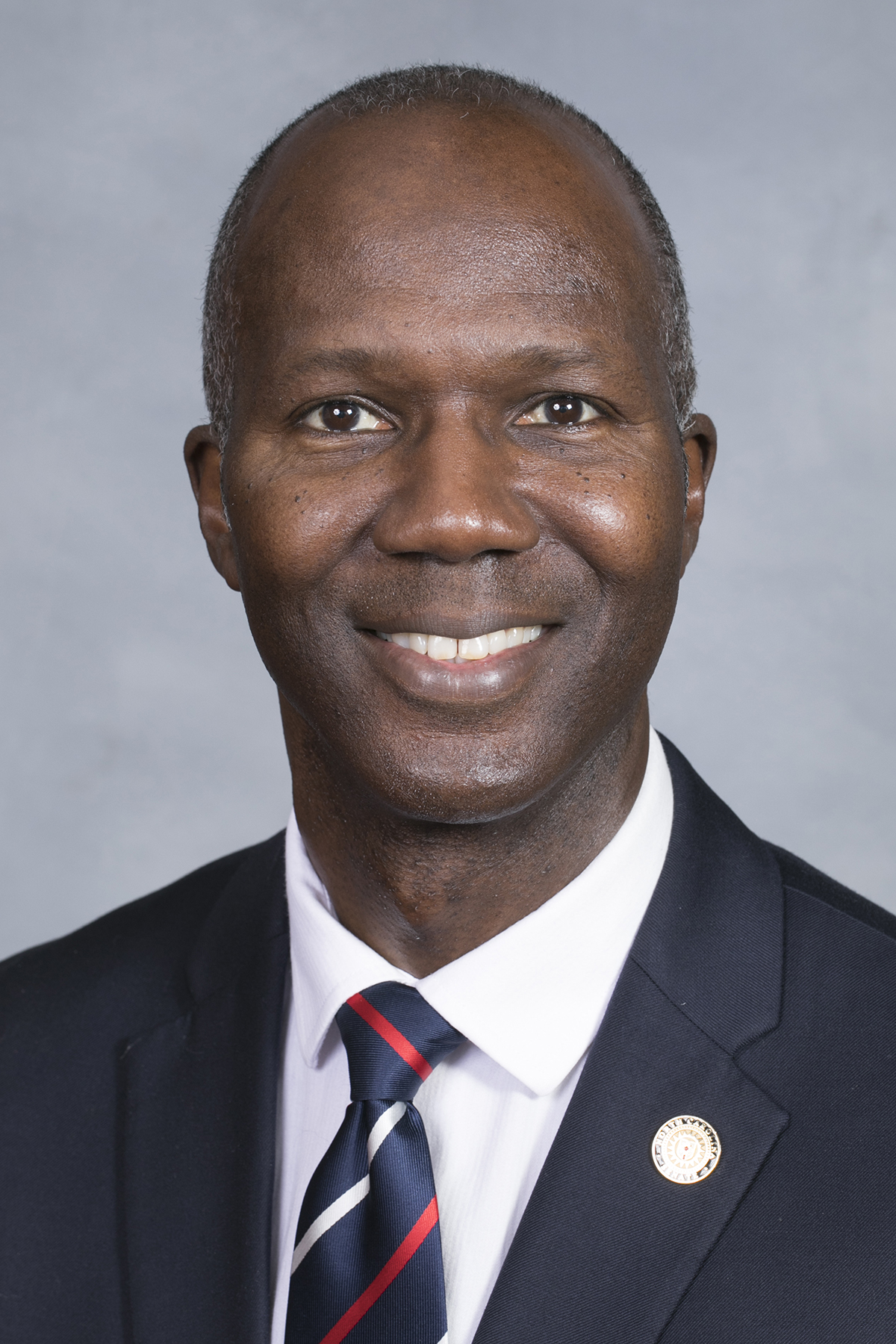

Member of the North Carolina Senate from the 21st district
- In office January 1, 2013 – January 1, 2023
- Preceded by: Eric Mansfield
- Succeeded by: Danny Britt (Redistricting)

Personal details
- Born: 1959 (age 66–67) Fort Bragg, North Carolina, U.S.
- Party: Democratic
- Education: North Carolina A&T State University (BS); Southern Illinois University, Edwardsville (MBA); George Washington University (GrDip)
- Website: Official website

Ben Clark is an American politician who served in the North Carolina Senate from the 21st district (representing constituents in Hoke and Cumberland counties) from 2013 to 2023. He also served as secretary of the Senate Democratic caucus. On September 20, 2021, Clark announced he wouldn't seek re-election in 2022. On November 22, 2021, Clark announced he would run for the congress in the newly-drawn NC-09 Congressional district.

== NC Senate ==
During five terms in the NC Senate, Clark has made his focus supporting the military, expanding healthcare access, and providing every child with a sound education. Clark led the effort to reopen NC schools after COVID-19 rates fell. He was 1 of 4 Democratic conferees on the 2021 budget that repealed NC taxes on military retirement income

== Electoral history ==
=== 2020 ===
North Carolina Senate 21st district general election, 2020
Party	Candidate	Votes	%
Democratic	Ben Clark (incumbent)	50,105	68.02%
Republican	Sev Palacios	23,557	31.98%
Total votes		73,662	100%
Democratic hold			

=== 2018 ===
North Carolina Senate 21st district Democratic primary election, 2018
Party	Candidate	Votes	%
Democratic	Ben Clark (incumbent)	6,491	55.63%
Democratic	Naveed Aziz	5,177	44.37%
Total votes		11,668	100%

North Carolina Senate 21st district general election, 2018
Party	Candidate	Votes	%
Democratic	Ben Clark (incumbent)	33,238	70.94%
Republican	Timothy Leever	13,616	29.06%
Total votes		46,854	100%
Democratic hold			

=== 2016 ===
North Carolina Senate 21st district Democratic primary election, 2016
Party	Candidate	Votes	%
Democratic	Ben Clark (incumbent)	11,736	49.80%
Democratic	Naveed Aziz	10,432	44.27%
Democratic	Eronomy Neon (Mohammed) Smith	1,398	5.93%
Total votes		23,566	100%

North Carolina Senate 21st district general election, 2016
Party	Candidate	Votes	%
Democratic	Ben Clark (incumbent)	49,081	71.74%
Republican	Dan Travieso	19,338	28.26%
Total votes		68,419	100%
Democratic hold			

=== 2014 ===
North Carolina Senate 21st district Democratic primary election, 2014
Party	Candidate	Votes	%
Democratic	Ben Clark (incumbent)	6,421	55.68%
Democratic	Billy R. King	3,860	33.47%
Democratic	Sylvia Adamczyk	766	6.64%
Democratic	Eronomy (Mohammed) Smith	484	4.20%
Total votes		11,531	100%

North Carolina Senate 21st district general election, 2014
Party	Candidate	Votes	%
Democratic	Ben Clark (incumbent)	31,663	100%
Total votes		31,663	100%
Democratic hold			

=== 2012 ===
North Carolina Senate 21st district Democratic primary election, 2012
Party	Candidate	Votes	%
Democratic	Billy R. King	4,353	24.46%
Democratic	Ben Clark	3,525	19.81%
Democratic	Larry Shaw	3,523	19.79%
Democratic	Curtis Worthy	3,385	19.02%
Democratic	Allen Thomas, Jr.	2,489	13.98%
Democratic	Eronomy (Mohammed) Smith	523	2.94%
Total votes		17,798	100%

North Carolina Senate 21st district Democratic primary run-off election, 2012
Party	Candidate	Votes	%
Democratic	Ben Clark	2,436	59.88%
Democratic	Billy R. King	1,632	40.12%
Total votes		4,068	100%

North Carolina Senate 21st district general election, 2012
Party	Candidate	Votes	%
Democratic	Ben Clark	57,805	100%
Total votes		57,805	100%
Democratic hold			

North Carolina Senate
Preceded by Eric Mansfield	Member of the North Carolina Senate from the 21st district 2013–2023	Succeeded by Tom McInnis
