= 2024 North Carolina Commissioner of Insurance election =

- November 5, 2024
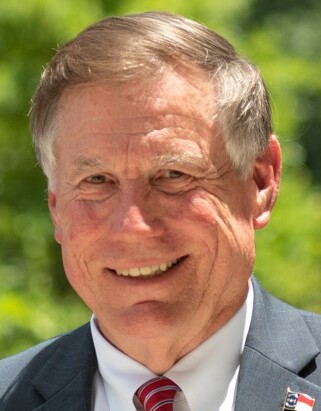

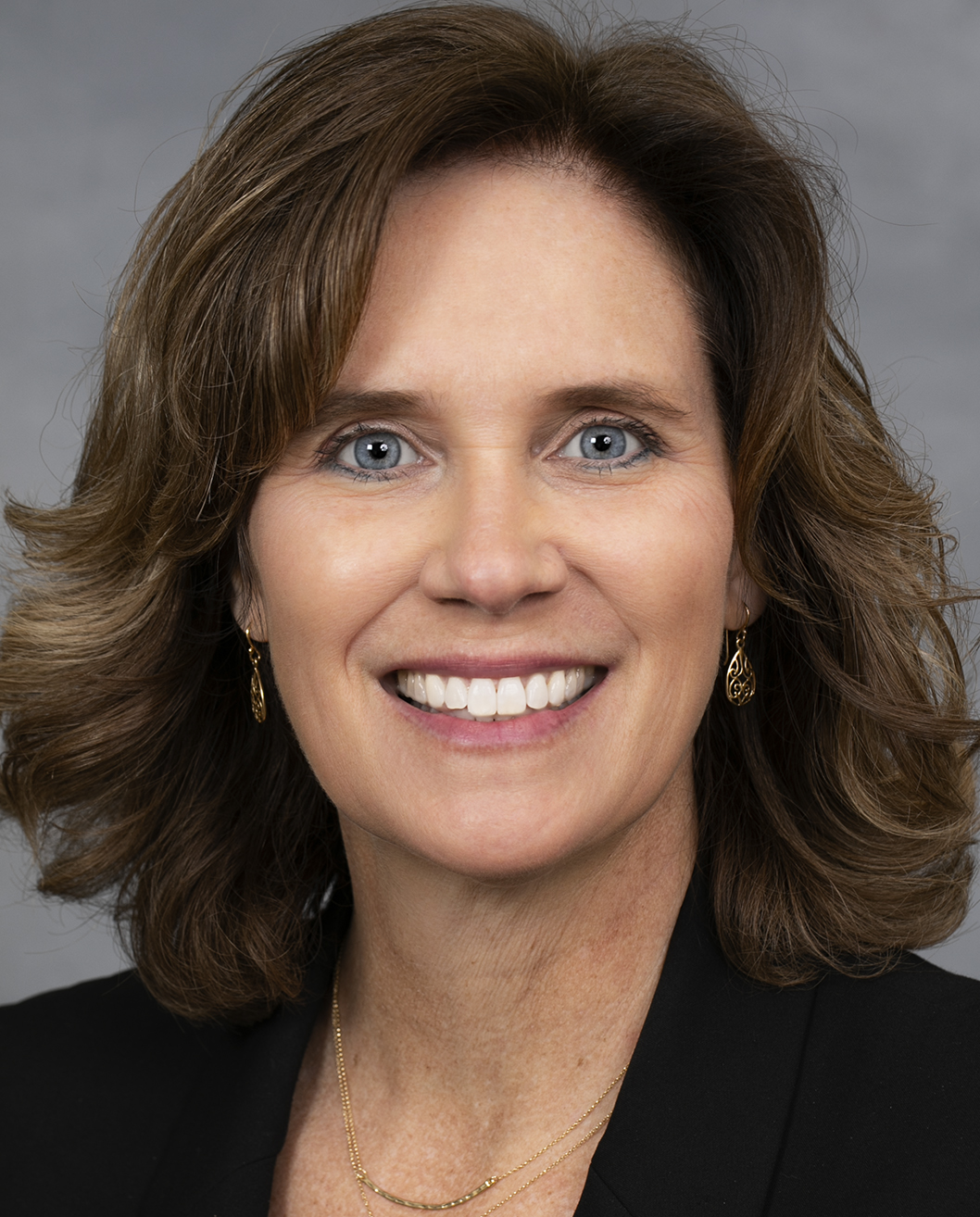
| Nominee | Mike Causey | Natasha Marcus |
| Party | Republican | Democratic |
| Popular vote | 2,883,996 | 2,649,353 |
| Percentage | 52.12% | 47.88% |
- Causey: 50–60% 60–70% 70–80% 80–90% Marcus: 50–60% 60–70% 70–80% 80–90%
Commissioner of Insurance before election
Mike Causey
Republican
Elected Commissioner of Insurance
Mike Causey
Republican

The 2024 North Carolina Commissioner of Insurance election was held on November 5, 2024, to elect the North Carolina Commissioner of Insurance, concurrently with elections to the U.S. House of Representatives, governor, and other state and local elections. Incumbent Republican insurance commissioner Mike Causey ran for re-election to a third term in office.

Primary elections were held on March 5, 2024. Causey won the Republican primary with 61% of the vote against two other candidates, and Natasha Marcus won the Democratic primary with 78% of the vote against David Wheeler.

Causey won re-election with 52.12% of the vote, a marginal improvement on his 2020 result. Marcus conceded the race the following day.

== Republican primary ==
=== Candidates ===
==== Nominee ====
- Mike Causey, incumbent insurance commissioner (2017–present)

==== Eliminated in primary ====
- Robert Brawley, state representative from the 95th district (2013–2015), 43rd district (1983–1999), and 35th district (1981–1983)
- Andrew Marcus, former insurance regulator and prosecutor (no relation to Natasha Marcus)

==== Results ====
Results by county Causey: 40–50%; 50–60%; 60–70%; 70–80%; Brawley: 40–50%

Republican primary results
| Party | Candidate | Votes | % |
|---|---|---|---|
| Republican | Mike Causey (incumbent) | 535,909 | 60.57% |
| Republican | Andrew Marcus | 193,962 | 21.92% |
| Republican | Robert Brawley | 154,843 | 17.50% |
| Total votes | | 884,714 | 100.0% |

== Democratic primary ==
=== Candidates ===
==== Nominee ====
- Natasha Marcus, state senator from the 41st district (2019–2025)

==== Eliminated in primary ====
- David Wheeler, businessman

=== Polling ===
| Poll source | Date(s) administered | Sample size (Note: Key: A – all adults RV – registered voters LV – likely voters V – unclear) | Margin of error | Natasha Marcus | David Wheeler | Undecided |
|---|---|---|---|---|---|---|
| Public Policy Polling (D) | December 15–16, 2023 | 556 (LV) | ± 4.2% | 23% | 5% | 72% |

=== Results ===
Results by county Marcus: 50–60%; 60–70%; 70–80%; 80–90%

Democratic primary results
| Party | Candidate | Votes | % |
|---|---|---|---|
| Democratic | Natasha Marcus | 506,592 | 77.63% |
| Democratic | David Wheeler | 145,991 | 22.37% |
| Total votes | | 652,583 | 100.0% |

== General election ==
=== Polling ===
| Poll source | Date(s) administered | Sample size | Margin of error | Mike Causey (R) | Natasha Marcus (D) | Undecided |
|---|---|---|---|---|---|---|
| ActiVote | October 8–26, 2024 | 400 (LV) | ± 4.9% | 50% | 50% | – |
| Cygnal (R) (Note: Poll sponsored by the Carolina Journal) | October 12–14, 2024 | 600 (LV) | ± 3.99% | 44% | 41% | 14% |
| ActiVote | August 20 – September 22, 2024 | 400 (LV) | ± 4.9% | 49% | 51% | – |
| Cygnal (R) | September 15–16, 2024 | 600 (LV) | ± 4.0% | 41% | 40% | 19% |

=== Results ===
2024 North Carolina Commissioner of Insurance election
| Party | Candidate | Votes | % | ±% |
|---|---|---|---|---|
| Republican | Mike Causey (incumbent) | 2,883,996 | 52.12% | +0.36% |
| Democratic | Natasha Marcus | 2,649,353 | 47.88% | −0.36% |
| Total votes | | 5,533,349 | 100.0% | |
| Republican hold | | | | |

Counties that flipped from Democratic to Republican

- Anson (largest city: Wadesboro)
- Nash (largest municipality: Rocky Mount)
- Pasquotank (largest city: Elizabeth City)
- Scotland (largest city: Laurinburg)
- Richmond (largest city: Rockingham)
- Wilson (largest city: Wilson)

==== By congressional district ====
Causey won 11 of 14 congressional districts, including one that elected a Democrat.

| District | Causey | Marcus | Representative |
|---|---|---|---|
| 1st | 52% | 48% | Don Davis |
| 2nd | 35% | 65% | Deborah Ross |
| 3rd | 61% | 39% | Greg Murphy |
| 4th | 28% | 72% | Valerie Foushee |
| 5th | 59% | 41% | Virginia Foxx |
| 6th | 59% | 41% | Addison McDowell |
| 7th | 57% | 43% | David Rouzer |
| 8th | 60% | 40% | Mark Harris |
| 9th | 59% | 41% | Richard Hudson |
| 10th | 60% | 40% | Pat Harrigan |
| 11th | 55% | 45% | Chuck Edwards |
| 12th | 28% | 72% | Alma Adams |
| 13th | 59% | 41% | Brad Knott |
| 14th | 58% | 42% | Tim Moore |

== See also ==
- 2024 North Carolina Council of State elections

== Notes ==
Partisan clients
