= Senator Sloan =

Senator Sloan may refer to:

- Charles Henry Sloan (1863–1946), Nebraska State Senate
- George B. Sloan (1831–1904), New York State Senate
- R. B. Sloan Jr. (fl, 2000s), North Carolina State Senate
