= Jeff Tarte =

American politician

Member of the North Carolina Senate from the 41st district
- In office January 1, 2013 – January 1, 2019
- Preceded by: Constituency Established
- Succeeded by: Natasha Marcus

Personal details
- Born: September 1, 1956 (age 70) Cornelius, North Carolina
- Party: Republican

Jeff Tarte (born September 1, 1956) is an American politician who served in the North Carolina Senate from the 41st district from 2013 to 2019. He is a member of the Republican Party.

Tarte was defeated by Democrat Natasha Marcus in the 2018 election. He ran for North Carolina State Auditor in the 2024 elections, but the seat was won by Dave Boliek.

North Carolina Senate
Preceded by Chris Carney	Member of the North Carolina Senate from the 41st district 2013-2019	Succeeded by Natasha Marcus
