= North Carolina's 21st Senate district =

American legislative district

North Carolina's 21st State Senate district
Senator
Tom McInnis; R–Pinehurst
- Demographics: 56% White; 25% Black; 10% Hispanic; 2% Asian; 1% Native American; 1% Other; 6% Multiracial
- Population (2023): 221,945

North Carolina's 21st Senate district is one of 50 districts in the North Carolina Senate. It has been represented by Republican Tom McInnis since 2023.

== Geography ==
Since 2023, the district has included all of Moore County, as well as part of Cumberland County. The district overlaps with the 42nd, 43rd, 45th, 51st, 52nd, and 78th state house districts.

== District officeholders since 1973 ==
=== Multi-member district ===
Senator	Party	Dates	Notes	Senator	Party	Dates	Notes	Counties
Malcolm Butner Sr. (Salisbury)	Republican	January 1, 1973 – January 1, 1975		Robert Vance Somers (Salisbury)	Republican	January 1, 1973 – January 1, 1975		1973–1983; All of Rowan, Davie, and Davidson Counties.
Jack Childers (Lexington)	Democratic	January 1, 1975 – January 1, 1981		Tom Suddarth (Lexington)	Democratic	January 1, 1975 – January 1, 1977		1973–1983; All of Rowan, Davie, and Davidson Counties.
Jack Childers (Lexington)	Democratic	January 1, 1975 – January 1, 1981		Robert Vance Somers (Salisbury)	Republican	January 1, 1977 – January 1, 1979		1973–1983; All of Rowan, Davie, and Davidson Counties.
Jack Childers (Lexington)	Democratic	January 1, 1975 – January 1, 1981		Robert Davis Jr. (Salisbury)	Democratic	January 1, 1979 – January 1, 1981		1973–1983; All of Rowan, Davie, and Davidson Counties.
Gilbert Lee Boger (Mocksville)	Republican	January 1, 1981 – January 1, 1983		Paul Sanders Smith (Salisbury)	Republican	January 1, 1981 – January 1, 1983		1973–1983; All of Rowan, Davie, and Davidson Counties.

=== Single-member district ===
Senator	Party	Dates	Notes	Counties
Cary Allred (Burlington)	Republican	January 1, 1983 – January 1, 1985	Redistricted from the 18th district. Retired to run for the Alamance County Board of Commissioners.	1983–1993; All of Alamance and Caswell counties.
John Jordan (Saxapahaw)	Democratic	January 1, 1985 – August 15, 1985	Resigned.	1983–1993; All of Alamance and Caswell counties.
Vacant		August 15, 1985 – September 25, 1985		1983–1993; All of Alamance and Caswell counties.
Timothy McDowell (Mebane)	Democratic	September 25, 1985 – January 1, 1987	Appointed to finish Jordan's term.	1983–1993; All of Alamance and Caswell counties.
George Daniel (Yanceyville)	Democratic	January 1, 1987 – January 1, 1995	Lost re-election.	1983–1993; All of Alamance and Caswell counties.
George Daniel (Yanceyville)	Democratic	January 1, 1987 – January 1, 1995	Lost re-election.	1993–2003; All of Alamance and Caswell counties. Part of Person County.
Hugh Webster (Burlington)	Republican	January 1, 1995 – January 1, 2003	Redistricted to the 24th district.	1993–2003; All of Alamance and Caswell counties. Part of Person County.
Larry Shaw (Fayetteville)	Democratic	January 1, 2003 – January 1, 2011	Redistricted from the 41st district. Retired.	2003–2013; Part of Cumberland County.
Eric Mansfield (Fayetteville)	Democratic	January 1, 2011 – January 1, 2013	Retired to run for Lieutenant Governor.	2003–2013; Part of Cumberland County.
Ben Clark (Raeford)	Democratic	January 1, 2013 – January 1, 2023	Redistricted to the 24th district and retired to run for Congress.	2013–2023; All of Hoke County. Part of Cumberland County.
Tom McInnis (Pinehurst)	Republican	January 1, 2023 – Present	Redistricted from the 25th district.	2023–Present; All of Moore County. Part of Cumberland County.

== Election results ==
=== 2024 ===
North Carolina Senate 21st district general election, 2024
Party	Candidate	Votes	%
Republican	Tom McInnis (incumbent)	67,494	62.76%
Democratic	Maurice (Butch) Holland Jr.	40,052	37.24%
Total votes		107,546	100%
Republican hold			

=== 2022 ===
North Carolina Senate 21st district general election, 2022
Party	Candidate	Votes	%
Republican	Tom McInnis (incumbent)	36,468	54.63%
Democratic	Frank McNeill Jr.	30,281	45.37%
Total votes		66,749	100%
Republican hold			

=== 2020 ===
North Carolina Senate 21st district general election, 2020
Party	Candidate	Votes	%
Democratic	Ben Clark (incumbent)	50,105	68.02%
Republican	Sev Palacios	23,557	31.98%
Total votes		73,662	100%
Democratic hold			

=== 2018 ===
North Carolina Senate 21st district Democratic primary election, 2018
Party	Candidate	Votes	%
Democratic	Ben Clark (incumbent)	6,491	55.63%
Democratic	Naveed Aziz	5,177	44.37%
Total votes		11,668	100%

North Carolina Senate 21st district general election, 2018
Party	Candidate	Votes	%
Democratic	Ben Clark (incumbent)	33,238	70.94%
Republican	Timothy Leever	13,616	29.06%
Total votes		46,854	100%
Democratic hold			

=== 2016 ===
North Carolina Senate 21st district Democratic primary election, 2016
Party	Candidate	Votes	%
Democratic	Ben Clark (incumbent)	11,736	49.80%
Democratic	Naveed Aziz	10,432	44.27%
Democratic	Eronomy Neon "Mohammed" Smith	1,398	5.93%
Total votes		23,566	100%

North Carolina Senate 21st district general election, 2016
Party	Candidate	Votes	%
Democratic	Ben Clark (incumbent)	49,081	71.74%
Republican	Dan Travieso	19,338	28.26%
Total votes		68,419	100%
Democratic hold			

=== 2014 ===
North Carolina Senate 21st district Democratic primary election, 2014
Party	Candidate	Votes	%
Democratic	Ben Clark (incumbent)	6,421	55.68%
Democratic	Billy R. King	3,860	33.47%
Democratic	Sylvia Adamczyk	766	6.64%
Democratic	Eronomy "Mohammed" Smith	484	4.20%
Total votes		11,531	100%

North Carolina Senate 21st district general election, 2014
Party	Candidate	Votes	%
Democratic	Ben Clark (incumbent)	31,663	100%
Total votes		31,663	100%
Democratic hold			

=== 2012 ===
North Carolina Senate 21st district Democratic primary election, 2012
Party	Candidate	Votes	%
Democratic	Billy R. King	4,353	24.46%
Democratic	Ben Clark	3,525	19.81%
Democratic	Larry Shaw	3,523	19.79%
Democratic	Curtis Worthy	3,385	19.02%
Democratic	Allen Thomas Jr.	2,489	13.98%
Democratic	Eronomy "Mohammed" Smith	523	2.94%
Total votes		17,798	100%

North Carolina Senate 21st district Democratic primary run-off election, 2012
Party	Candidate	Votes	%
Democratic	Ben Clark	2,436	59.88%
Democratic	Billy R. King	1,632	40.12%
Total votes		4,068	100%

North Carolina Senate 21st district general election, 2012
Party	Candidate	Votes	%
Democratic	Ben Clark	57,805	100%
Total votes		57,805	100%
Democratic hold			

=== 2010 ===
North Carolina Senate 21st district Democratic primary election, 2010
Party	Candidate	Votes	%
Democratic	Eric Mansfield	2,813	34.76%
Democratic	Lula Crenshaw	2,315	28.60%
Democratic	Curtis Worthy	1,978	24.44%
Democratic	Eugene Stackhouse	533	6.59%
Democratic	Robert Lee Evans	454	5.61%
Total votes		8,093	100%

North Carolina Senate 21st district Democratic primary run-off election, 2010
Party	Candidate	Votes	%
Democratic	Eric Mansfield	3,344	61.81%
Democratic	Lula Crenshaw	2,066	38.19%
Total votes		5,410	100%

North Carolina Senate 21st district general election, 2010
Party	Candidate	Votes	%
Democratic	Eric Mansfield	21,004	67.61%
Republican	Wade Fowler	10,062	32.39%
Total votes		31,066	100%
Democratic hold			

=== 2008 ===
North Carolina Senate 21st district Democratic primary election, 2008
Party	Candidate	Votes	%
Democratic	Larry Shaw (incumbent)	19,274	81.07%
Democratic	Eronomy "Mohammed" Smith	4,501	18.93%
Total votes		23,775	100%

North Carolina Senate 21st district general election, 2008
Party	Candidate	Votes	%
Democratic	Larry Shaw (incumbent)	48,430	100%
Total votes		48,430	100%
Democratic hold			

=== 2006 ===
North Carolina Senate 21st district Democratic primary election, 2006
Party	Candidate	Votes	%
Democratic	Larry Shaw (incumbent)	3,384	57.11%
Democratic	Curtis Worthy	2,403	40.56%
Democratic	Eronomy "Mohammed" Smith	138	2.33%
Total votes		5,925	100%

North Carolina Senate 21st district Republican primary election, 2006
Party	Candidate	Votes	%
Republican	Juanita M. Gonzalez	679	59.56%
Republican	Richard D. Evans	461	40.44%
Total votes		1,140	100%

North Carolina Senate 21st district general election, 2006
Party	Candidate	Votes	%
Democratic	Larry Shaw (incumbent)	13,412	61.65%
Republican	Juanita M. Gonzales	8,344	38.35%
Total votes		21,756	100%
Democratic hold			

=== 2004 ===
North Carolina Senate 21st district Democratic primary election, 2004
Party	Candidate	Votes	%
Democratic	Larry Shaw (incumbent)	3,597	49.81%
Democratic	D.J. Haire	3,379	46.79%
Democratic	Eronomy "Mohammed" Smith	245	3.39%
Total votes		7,221	100%

North Carolina Senate 21st district general election, 2004
Party	Candidate	Votes	%
Democratic	Larry Shaw (incumbent)	27,866	61.21%
Republican	Richard D. Evans	16,434	36.10%
Libertarian	Brian Irving	1,225	2.69%
Total votes		45,525	100%
Democratic hold			

=== 2002 ===
North Carolina Senate 21st district Democratic primary election, 2002
Party	Candidate	Votes	%
Democratic	Larry Shaw (incumbent)	6,951	66.31%
Democratic	Audrey "Sister" Ray	3,532	33.69%
Total votes		10,483	100%

North Carolina Senate 21st district general election, 2002
Party	Candidate	Votes	%
Democratic	Larry Shaw (incumbent)	16,584	66.66%
Republican	Richard D. Evans	8,293	33.34%
Total votes		24,877	100%
Democratic hold			

=== 2000 ===
North Carolina Senate 21st district Democratic primary election, 2000
Party	Candidate	Votes	%
Democratic	Wiley P. Wooten	6,757	60.39%
Democratic	Bill Powell	4,432	39.61%
Total votes		11,189	100%

North Carolina Senate 21st district general election, 2000
Party	Candidate	Votes	%
Republican	Hugh Webster (incumbent)	31,994	55.54%
Democratic	Wiley P. Wooten	25,617	44.47%
Total votes		57,611	100%
Republican hold			
