= Cal Cunningham =

American politician (born 1973)

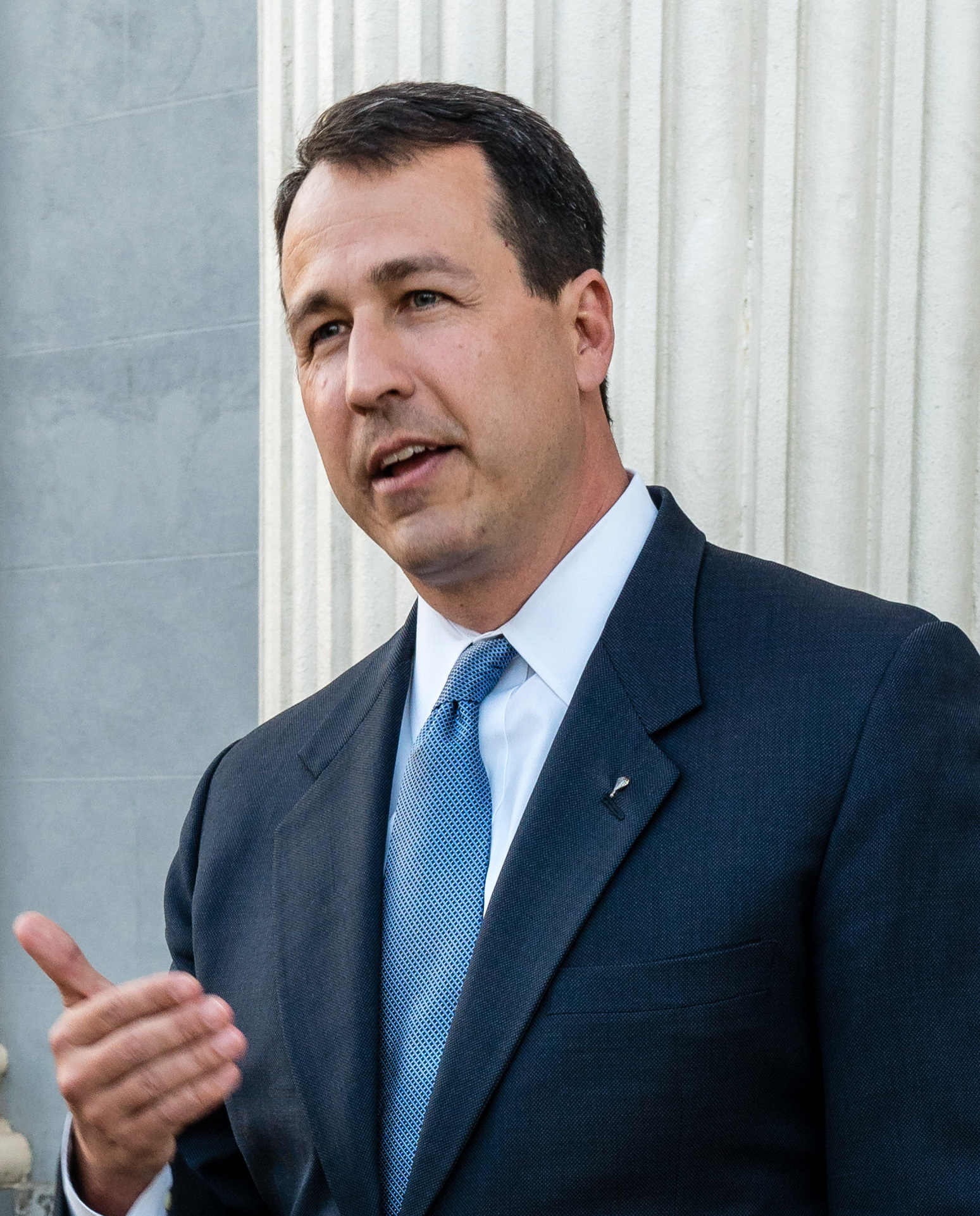
- Cunningham in 2019

Member of the North Carolina Senate from the 23rd district
- In office January 1, 2001 – January 1, 2003
- Preceded by: Jim Phillips Sr.
- Succeeded by: Stan Bingham (redistricted)

Personal details
- Born: James Calvin Cunningham III; August 6, 1973 (age 52) Winston-Salem, North Carolina, U.S.
- Party: Democratic
- Education: Vanderbilt University; University of North Carolina, Chapel Hill (BA, JD); London School of Economics (MSc)

Military service
- Allegiance: United States
- Branch/service: United States Army
- Rank: Lieutenant Colonel
- Unit: United States Army Reserve
- Battles/wars: Iraq War; War in Afghanistan
- Awards: Bronze Star

James Calvin Cunningham III (born August 6, 1973) is an American lawyer, politician, and retired military officer. A member of the Democratic Party and a lieutenant colonel in the United States Army Reserve, he served one term as a North Carolina state senator from 2001 to 2003. Having previously run for United States Senate in a 2010 primary, Cunningham was the Democratic nominee for the 2020 U.S. Senate election in North Carolina, narrowly losing to incumbent Republican Thom Tillis.

== Early life and education ==
Cunningham was born in Winston-Salem, North Carolina, and grew up in Lexington, North Carolina. He attended Vanderbilt University before transferring to the University of North Carolina at Chapel Hill, graduating in 1996 with a bachelor's degree in political science and philosophy. In the summer of 1993, Cunningham attended American University and interned on Capitol Hill for a subcommittee chaired by Senator Carl Levin.

Cunningham received a Master of Science in public policy and public administration from the London School of Economics and a Juris Doctor from the University of North Carolina School of Law.

== Career ==
=== U.S. Army Reserve ===
In 2002, Cunningham was commissioned in the Army Reserve, Judge Advocate General's Corps. He is a graduate of the Officer Basic Course, Airborne School, and the Judge Advocate Officer Advanced Course.

From 2007 to 2008, Cunningham was mobilized as the senior trial counsel for the Multi-National Corps in Iraq. He was lead counsel in the first court-martial since 1968 of a contractor under the Uniform Code of Military Justice. In 2011, Cunningham was assigned to work with a special operations task force in Afghanistan.

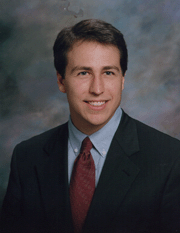
Cunningham as a State Senator

=== State Senate ===
In November 2000, Cunningham was elected to represent the 23rd Senate district of the North Carolina General Assembly, which included parts of Davidson, Rowan, and Iredell Counties. At the time of his election, he was North Carolina's youngest legislator. After his election, a defeated opponent challenged Cunningham's eligibility on the basis that he had moved back to the district a few days too late to meet the requirement of having lived there for a full year, but the courts rejected the challenge. Cunningham declined to run for reelection after his district's territory was split between three Republican-leaning districts.

=== Post-State Senate career ===
Cunningham worked at the Wallace & Graham law firm from 2003 until 2004, when he joined Kilpatrick Townsend.

Since 2003, Cunningham has served as an appointee of the Governor on the Board of Trustees of Davidson County Community College. He also served as an appointee of the Governor on the North Carolina Banking Commission. He is a former vice chair of the Governor's Crime Commission.

In 2013, Cunningham joined the environmental services company WasteZero as vice president, government affairs, and general counsel. WasteZero helps support pay-as-you-throw waste reduction systems which municipalities in North Carolina and elsewhere have debated implementing. Cunningham left WasteZero in March 2020, shortly after winning the Democratic nomination, but continues to work for the company as an independent contractor.

== U.S. Senate candidacies ==
=== 2010 primary campaign ===
In 2010, Cunningham ran for the U.S. Senate seat held by Richard Burr. Retired NATO Supreme Allied Commander General Wesley Clark endorsed Cunningham, saying that he would be "the first veteran of the wars in Iraq and Afghanistan to serve in the U.S. Senate", as did the state's largest organization of teachers, the North Carolina Association of Educators. He finished second in the primary, but since no candidate received 40% of the vote, he advanced to a runoff with the first-place finisher, North Carolina Secretary of State Elaine Marshall, who ultimately won the nomination with 60% of the vote.

=== 2020 campaign ===
Cunningham originally declared his candidacy for lieutenant governor of North Carolina, but he withdrew in June 2019 to run for the United States Senate seat held by Thom Tillis instead. During the primary, a Republican-allied Super PAC spent $3 million on ads attacking Cunningham and supporting left-wing state Senator Erica Smith in order to "amplify fault lines in the Democratic party." On March 3, 2020, Cunningham won the Democratic primary with 57% of the vote.

Cunningham stated his support of the Affordable Care Act and called for the expansion of Medicaid in North Carolina, as well as a public health insurance option. He stated his opposition to the Green New Deal and his support for significant investment in green jobs and achieving net zero carbon emissions by 2050.

In July 2020, incumbent Republican Thom Tillis claimed Cunningham had been "silent" on the issue of defunding the police, saying, "I assume his silence is consent." Cunningham had published an op-ed a month earlier stating his opposition to defunding the police, instead advocating police reform, including policies that "counsel de-escalation, prohibit chokeholds, limit no-knock warrants, and specifically address the use of deadly force."

Cunningham narrowly led Tillis in the polls throughout much of the campaign.

On October 3, the New York Times wrote that the race had fallen into "utter mayhem" within a period of a few hours after Tillis tested positive for COVID-19 and Cunningham admitted to exchanging sexual text messages with a woman who was not his wife, damaging an image that leaned heavily on his character and military service. Days later, the woman, Arlene Guzman Todd, stated that she had a consensual physical relationship with Cunningham in 2020. The Army Reserve started an investigation into Cunningham. Jeremy Todd, the husband of the woman who stated that she had had an affair with Cunningham, himself an Army veteran, called on Cunningham to drop out of the Senate race. Asked repeatedly whether he had had other extramarital affairs, Cunningham declined to answer.

Following the disclosure of the texts and his response, Cunningham "assumed a position of complete radio silence, withdrawing from the campaign trail [save] for a last-minute appearance in Charlotte with the rapper Common". In late October, Cunningham's polling lead eroded.

Tillis narrowly defeated Cunningham, 48.7–46.9%, on Election Day. On November 10, 2020, a week after Election Day, Cunningham called Tillis to concede the race.

== Honors and awards ==
For his service in Iraq, Cunningham was awarded the Bronze Star Medal for meritorious service as a lead investigator examining contractors. In 2009, he received the General Douglas MacArthur Award for Leadership.

Cunningham is a recipient of a Jaycees' Distinguished Service Award.

In 2007, Cunningham was selected for a Marshall Memorial Fellowship.

== Personal life ==
Cunningham and his wife, Elizabeth, have two children. As of September 2020, he was an ordained elder in the Presbyterian Church.

In October 2020, it was reported that Cunningham had exchanged sexually suggestive messages with a married woman who was not his wife. Cunningham confirmed the texts were authentic and apologized for his behavior. The woman, Arlene Guzman Todd, stated that she had a consensual physical relationship with Cunningham in 2020. The Army Reserve started an investigation into Cunningham.

== Electoral history ==
=== North Carolina Senate election ===
==== 2000 ====
North Carolina Senate 23rd District, 2000 General Election
Party	Candidate	Votes	%
Democratic	Cal Cunningham	27,726	53.37%
Republican	John Scott Keadle	23,095	44.45%
Libertarian	Lawrence James Clark	1,131	2.18%
Total votes		51,952	100
Democratic hold			

=== United States Senate elections ===
==== 2010 ====
2010 United States Senate election in North Carolina, Democratic primary
Party	Candidate	Votes	%
Democratic	Elaine Marshall	154,605	36.35%
Democratic	Cal Cunningham	115,851	27.24%
Democratic	Ken Lewis	72,510	17.05%
Democratic	Marcus W. Williams	35,984	8.46%
Democratic	Susan Harris	29,738	6.99%
Democratic	Ann Worthy	16,655	3.92%
Total votes		425,343	100

Since no candidate received 40% of the vote in the primary, state law allowed a runoff election if requested by the second-place finisher. Cunningham requested such a runoff.

2010 United States Senate election in North Carolina, Democratic primary runoff
Party	Candidate	Votes	%
Democratic	Elaine Marshall	95,390	59.96%
Democratic	Cal Cunningham	63,691	40.04%
Total votes		159,081	100

==== 2020 ====
2020 United States Senate election in North Carolina, Democratic primary
Party	Candidate	Votes	%
Democratic	Cal Cunningham	713,234	57.00%
Democratic	Erica D. Smith	434,921	34.76%
Democratic	Trevor M. Fuller	47,632	3.81%
Democratic	Steve Swenson	33,481	2.68%
Democratic	Atul Goel	22,016	1.76%
Total votes		1,251,284	100

2020 United States Senate election in North Carolina
Party	Candidate	Votes	%	±%
Republican	Thom Tillis (incumbent)	2,665,598	48.69%	−0.13%
Democratic	Cal Cunningham	2,569,965	46.94%	−0.32%
Libertarian	Shannon Bray	171,571	3.13%	−0.61%
Constitution	Kevin E. Hayes	67,818	1.24%	N/A
Total votes		5,474,952	100	
Republican hold				

Party political offices
Preceded by Kay Hagan	Democratic nominee for U.S. Senator from North Carolina (Class 2); 2020	Succeeded by Roy Cooper
