= James Forrester (politician) =

American politician

Member of the North Carolina Senate
- In office January 1, 1991 – October 31, 2011
- Preceded by: J. Ollie Harris; Marshall Arthur Rauch
- Succeeded by: Chris Carney
- Constituency: 25th district (1991–1993); 39th district (1993–2003); 42nd district (2003–2005); 41st district (2005–2011)

Personal details
- Born: January 8, 1937 Aberdeen, Scotland
- Died: October 31, 2011 (aged 74)
- Party: Republican
- Education: Wake Forest University (BS, MD); University of North Carolina, Chapel Hill (MPH)

James Summers Forrester (January 8, 1937 – October 31, 2011) was a Republican member of the North Carolina General Assembly representing the state's forty-first senate district, including constituents in the Iredell, Gaston and Lincoln counties. A physician from Stanley, North Carolina, Forrester died while serving his eleventh term in the state senate, in which he also served as Deputy President Pro Tempore.

== Personal life ==
Forrester was born in Aberdeen, Scotland, the son of Jim Forrester, a professional golfer. His father died in 1938 when his son was 18 months old. Forrester graduated from New Hanover High School in 1954. Forrester earned a bachelor's degree in science from Wake Forest University in 1958 and his medical degree from the Bowman Gray School of Medicine in 1962 and a Master's in Public Health from the University of North Carolina at Chapel Hill in 1978. On March 12, 1960, he married Mary Frances All; together they had four children. Forrester also served in the North Carolina Air National Guard, and participated in the Vietnam War as a flight physician. Forrester also ran a private practice for family medicine in Gaston County, North Carolina. Forrester died on October 31, 2011, at age of 74.

== Political career ==
Forrester was elected as Gaston County commissioner in 1982. In 1990, he was elected into the North Carolina State Senate.

He gained notoriety when he became the chief sponsor of Senate Bill 514 which would amend the state constitution to ban same-sex marriages in North Carolina in 2011. He had introduced this amendment at every session since 2004. After the Republicans won control of the General Assembly, Forrester's amendment eventually passed both houses. The proposed amendment to the constitution will appear on the state's 2012 primary ballot.

Forrester was criticized for allegedly misrepresenting his medical credentials. He claimed to be a member of the American Medical Association, a fellow of the American College of Preventive Medicine and an associate fellow of the Aerospace Medical Association. The ACPM revealed that Forrester was not a member or a fellow of the ACPM. Later that day, Laura Leslie of WRAL-TV in Raleigh reported that Forrester was not an associate fellow of the Aerospace Medical Association either. The next day, Leslie reported that Forrester was not a member of the American Medical Association. Forrester responded that "If there's anything falsified on my records it was inadvertently done." He added that "The gay and lesbian community is looking for anything they can to discredit me."

North Carolina Senate
Preceded by J. Ollie Harris; Marshall Arthur Rauch	Member of the North Carolina Senate from the 25th district 1991–1993; Served alongside: John Carter, Helen Rhyne Marvin	Succeeded by David Hoyle
New district	Member of the North Carolina Senate from the 39th district 1993–2003	Succeeded by Bob Rucho
Preceded by Bob Carpenter	Member of the North Carolina Senate from the 42nd district 2003–2005	Succeeded by Austin Allran
Preceded by R. B. Sloan Jr.	Member of the North Carolina Senate from the 41st district 2005–2011	Succeeded by Chris Carney
