= R. B. Sloan Jr. =

American politician

R. B. Sloan Jr. is a Republican member of the North Carolina General Assembly representing the state's forty-first Senate district, including constituents in Alexander and Iredell counties. A corporate executive from Mooresville, North Carolina, Sloan is currently (2003-2004 session) serving in his first term in the state Senate.

North Carolina Senate
Preceded by Larry Shaw	Member of the North Carolina Senate from the 41st district 2003–2005	Succeeded by James Forrester
