= North Carolina's 41st Senate district =

American legislative district

North Carolina's 41st State Senate district
Senator
Caleb Theodros; D–Charlotte
- Demographics: 41% White; 37% Black; 12% Hispanic; 5% Asian; 4% Multiracial
- Population (2023): 214,645

North Carolina's 41st Senate district is one of 50 districts in the North Carolina Senate. It has been represented by Democrat Caleb Theodros since 2025.

== Geography ==
Since 2013, the district has covered part of Mecklenburg County. The district overlaps with the 99th, 101st, 102nd, 104th, and 107th state house districts.

== District officeholders since 1993 ==
Senator	Party	Dates	Notes	Counties
District created January 1, 1993.				1993–2003; Part of Cumberland County.
Chancy Rudolph Edwards (Fayetteville)	Democratic	January 1, 1993 – January 1, 1997		1993–2003; Part of Cumberland County.
Larry Shaw (Fayetteville)	Democratic	January 1, 1997 – January 1, 2003	Redistricted to the 21st district.	1993–2003; Part of Cumberland County.
R. B. Sloan Jr. (Mooresville)	Republican	January 1, 2003 – January 1, 2005	Lost re-nomination.	2003–2005; All of Alexander and Iredell counties.
James Forrester (Stanley)	Republican	January 1, 2005 – October 31, 2011	Redistricted from the 42nd district. Died.	2005–2013; All of Lincoln County. Parts of Gaston and Iredell counties.
Vacant		October 31, 2011 - December 8, 2011		2005–2013; All of Lincoln County. Parts of Gaston and Iredell counties.
Chris Carney (Mooresville)	Republican	December 8, 2011 – January 1, 2013	Appointed to finish Forrester's term. Redistricted to the 44th district and lost re-nomination.	2005–2013; All of Lincoln County. Parts of Gaston and Iredell counties.
Jeff Tarte (Cornelius)	Republican	January 1, 2013 – January 1, 2019	Lost re-election.	2013–Present; Part of Mecklenburg County.
Natasha Marcus (Davidson)	Democratic	January 1, 2019 – January 1, 2025	Redistricted to the 37th district and retired to run for Insurance Commissioner.	2013–Present; Part of Mecklenburg County.
Caleb Theodros (Charlotte)	Democratic	January 1, 2025 – Present		2013–Present; Part of Mecklenburg County.

== Election results ==
=== 2024 ===
North Carolina Senate 41st district Democratic primary election, 2024
Party	Candidate	Votes	%
Democratic	Caleb Theodros	7,230	42.84%
Democratic	Lucille Puckett	5,268	31.22%
Democratic	Kendrick Cunningham	2,784	16.50%
Democratic	Robert Bruns	1,593	9.44%
Total votes		16,875	100%

North Carolina Senate 41st district general election, 2024
Party	Candidate	Votes	%
Democratic	Caleb Theodros	95,805	100%
Total votes		95,805	100%
Democratic win (new seat)			

=== 2022 ===
North Carolina Senate 41st district general election, 2022
Party	Candidate	Votes	%
Democratic	Natasha Marcus (incumbent)	46,358	66.52%
Republican	Bonni Leone	23,331	33.48%
Total votes		69,689	100%
Democratic hold			

=== 2020 ===
North Carolina Senate 41st district general election, 2020
Party	Candidate	Votes	%
Democratic	Natasha Marcus (incumbent)	82,741	71.93%
Constitution	Christopher Cole	32,295	28.07%
Total votes		115,036	100%
Democratic hold			

=== 2018 ===
North Carolina Senate 41st district general election, 2018
Party	Candidate	Votes	%
Democratic	Natasha Marcus	49,459	56.85%
Republican	Jeff Tarte (incumbent)	37,536	43.15%
Total votes		86,995	100%
Democratic gain from Republican			

=== 2016 ===
North Carolina Senate 41st district general election, 2016
Party	Candidate	Votes	%
Republican	Jeff Tarte (incumbent)	55,519	54.48%
Democratic	Jonathan Hudson	41,453	40.68%
Libertarian	Christopher Cole	4,938	4.85%
Total votes		101,910	100%
Republican hold			

=== 2014 ===
North Carolina Senate 41st district general election, 2014
Party	Candidate	Votes	%
Republican	Jeff Tarte (incumbent)	35,572	60.47%
Democratic	Latrice McRae	23,255	39.53%
Total votes		58,827	100%
Republican hold			

=== 2012 ===
North Carolina Senate 41st district Republican primary election, 2012
Party	Candidate	Votes	%
Republican	Jeff Tarte	6,423	37.63%
Republican	John Aneralla	6,193	36.28%
Republican	Troy Stafford	1,837	10.76%
Republican	Robby Benton	1,423	8.34%
Republican	Donald L. Copeland Sr.	1,194	6.99%
Total votes		17,070	100%

North Carolina Senate 41st district Republican primary run-off election, 2012
Party	Candidate	Votes	%
Republican	Jeff Tarte	4,207	51.17%
Republican	John Aneralla	4,014	48.83%
Total votes		8,221	100%

North Carolina Senate 41st district general election, 2012
Party	Candidate	Votes	%
Republican	Jeff Tarte	64,153	100%
Total votes		64,153	100%
Republican win (new seat)			

=== 2010 ===
North Carolina Senate 41st district Republican primary election, 2010
Party	Candidate	Votes	%
Republican	James Forrester (incumbent)	9,671	83.25%
Republican	Mark Richard Vanek	1,946	16.75%
Total votes		11,617	100%

North Carolina Senate 41st district general election, 2010
Party	Candidate	Votes	%
Republican	James Forrester (incumbent)	43,461	100%
Total votes		43,461	100%
Republican hold			

=== 2008 ===
North Carolina Senate 41st district general election, 2008
Party	Candidate	Votes	%
Republican	James Forrester (incumbent)	67,211	100%
Total votes		67,211	100%
Republican hold			

=== 2006 ===
North Carolina Senate 41st district general election, 2006
Party	Candidate	Votes	%
Republican	James Forrester (incumbent)	30,320	100%
Total votes		30,320	100%
Republican hold			

=== 2004 ===
North Carolina Senate 41st district Republican primary election, 2004
Party	Candidate	Votes	%
Republican	James Forrester (incumbent)	6,129	57.74%
Republican	R. B. Sloan Jr. (incumbent)	4,485	42.26%
Total votes		10,614	100%

North Carolina Senate 41st district general election, 2004
Party	Candidate	Votes	%
Republican	James Forrester (incumbent)	50,458	68.93%
Democratic	Rita W. McElwaine	22,741	31.07%
Total votes		73,199	100%
Republican hold			

=== 2002 ===
North Carolina Senate 41st district general election, 2002
Party	Candidate	Votes	%
Republican	R. B. Sloan Jr.	30,338	68.02%
Democratic	Victor Crosby	14,261	31.98%
Total votes		44,599	100%
Republican win (new seat)			

=== 2000 ===
North Carolina Senate 41st district general election, 2000
Party	Candidate	Votes	%
Democratic	Larry Shaw (incumbent)	6,052	87.38%
Democratic	Eronomy Mohammed Smith	874	12.62%
Total votes		6,926	100%

North Carolina Senate 41st district general election, 2000
Party	Candidate	Votes	%
Democratic	Larry Shaw (incumbent)	20,392	100%
Total votes		20,392	100%
Democratic hold			
