= Larry Shaw (politician) =

American politician

Larry Shaw is a Democratic member of the North Carolina General Assembly representing the state's twenty-first Senate district, including constituents in Cumberland County from 1995 to 2011. A corporate executive from Fayetteville, North Carolina, Shaw is currently serving in his seventh term in the North Carolina Senate. Previously, he served one term in the North Carolina House of Representatives. In 2010, Shaw announced that he would not seek re-election.

Shaw was the highest-ranking Muslim elected official in the United States until the election of Keith Ellison to represent Minnesota's 5th congressional district.

Shaw also served on the National Board of Council on American-Islamic Relations (CAIR). He became chairman of the board in 2009. In 2010 he became the host of an internet radio show on American Muslim 360 that is regularly scheduled for Tuesday evenings. The show is focused on current events and real world topics.

As of 2017, Mr. Shaw works as a golf coach at Sanderson High School in Raleigh, North Carolina.

North Carolina House of Representatives
Preceded by Theodore James Kinney	Member of the North Carolina House of Representatives from the 17th district 1995–1997; Served alongside: Mary McAllister	Succeeded by Theodore James Kinney
North Carolina Senate
Preceded by Chancy Rudolph Edwards	Member of the North Carolina Senate from the 41st district 1997–2003	Succeeded by R. B. Sloan Jr.
Preceded by Hugh Webster	Member of the North Carolina Senate from the 21st district 2003–2011	Succeeded by Eric Mansfield
