= Eric L. Mansfield =

American politician and physician

Eric L. Mansfield is a physician and a former Democratic member of the North Carolina Senate representing the 21st Senate district (Cumberland County). After one term in the legislature, Sen. Mansfield ran for Lieutenant Governor of North Carolina in the 2012 election. He lost the Democratic primary to former state Rep. Linda Coleman on May 8, 2012. After the 2012 election, Mansfield announced that he would run for chairman of the North Carolina Democratic Party.

== Biography ==
Eric Mansfield was born in Louisiana and grew up in Columbus, Georgia. He attended Howard University in Washington D.C., the Morehouse School of Medicine, and conducted his surgical and otolaryngology residency at Tulane University's School of Medicine. He served as a medical officer in the United States Army and was stationed at Fort Bragg.

After his military service, Mansfield stayed in Fayetteville and established his own office: Cape Fear Otolaryngology, an ear, nose and throat practice.

North Carolina Senate
Preceded by Larry Shaw	Member of the North Carolina Senate from the 21st district 2011–2013	Succeeded by Ben Clark
