= 2010 United States Senate election in North Carolina =

- November 2, 2010
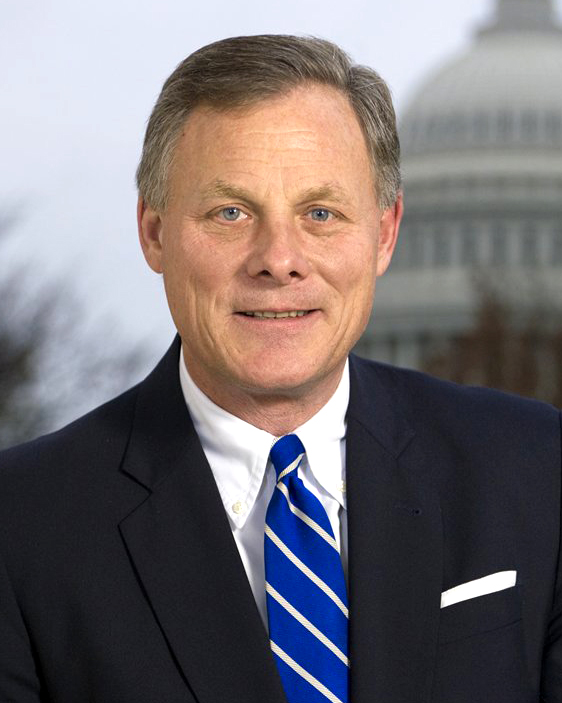

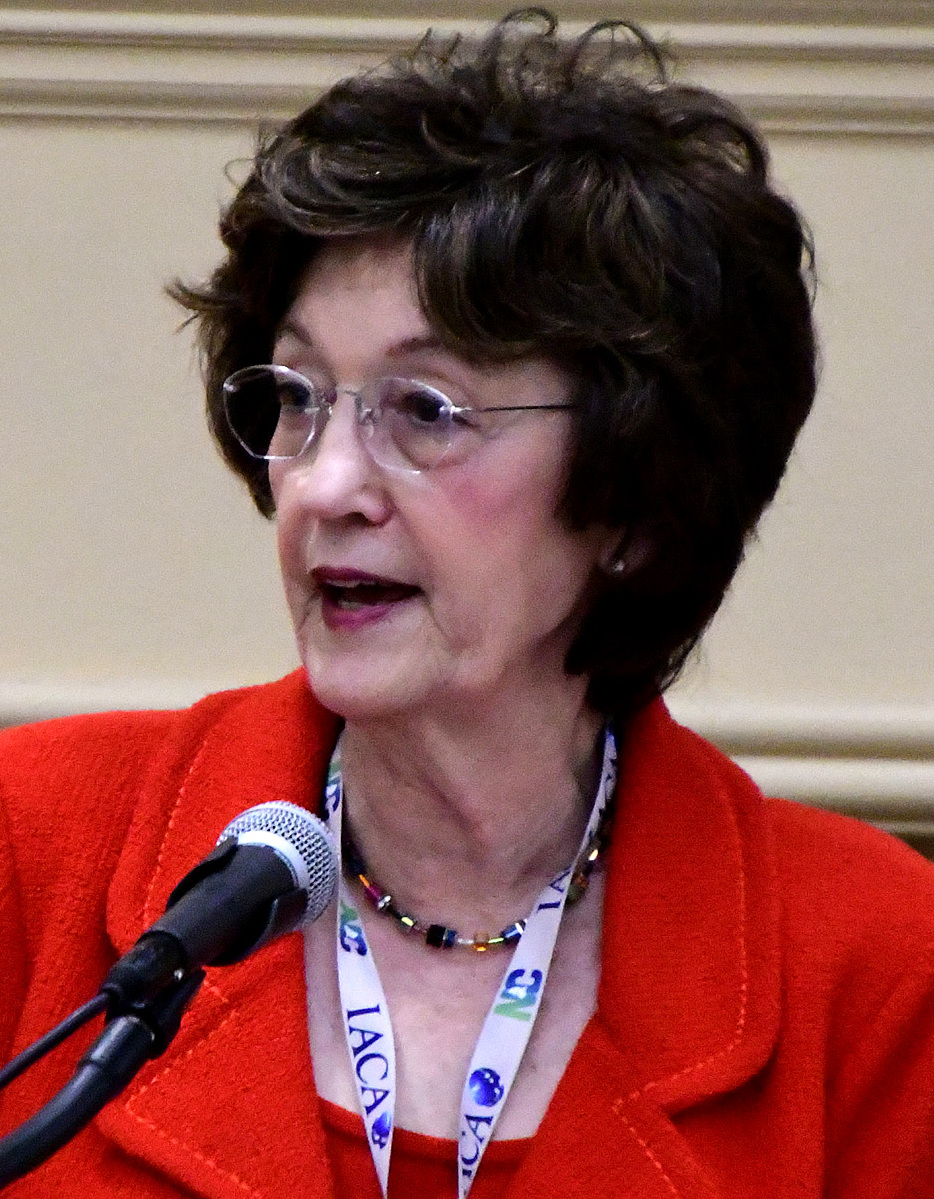
Nominee	Richard Burr	Elaine Marshall
Party	Republican	Democratic
Popular vote	1,458,046	1,145,074
Percentage	54.81%	43.05%
- Burr: 40–50% 50–60% 60–70% 70–80% 80–90% >90% Marshall: 40–50% 50–60% 60–70% 70–80% 80–90% >90% Tie: 40–50%
U.S. senator before election
Richard Burr
Republican
Elected U.S. Senator
Richard Burr
Republican

The 2010 United States Senate election in North Carolina was held on November 2, 2010. The filing deadline for the primaries was February 26; the primaries were held on May 4, with a Democratic primary runoff held on June 22. Incumbent Republican U.S. Senator Richard Burr won re-election to a second term. Burr is the first incumbent to win re-election for this seat since Sam Ervin's last re-election in 1968.

Burr was the first Republican re-elected to this seat. Burr's 54.8% also represented the highest vote share a North Carolina Republican received since the state began directly electing its senators.

This was one of the five Republican-held Senate seats up for election in a state that Barack Obama won in the 2008 presidential election.

== Background ==
This Senate seat was unfavorable to incumbents over the past several decades. No person elected to this seat was re-elected since Sam Ervin in 1968. His successor, Democrat Robert Burren Morgan, was defeated for re-election in 1980, along with many other incumbents from his party. His Republican successor, John Porter East, committed suicide in 1986. East's appointed successor, Jim Broyhill, served for just four months, resigning upon his November 1986 election loss to former Democratic Governor Terry Sanford. In 1992, the seat changed hands yet again, as Sanford was defeated by wealthy GOP businessman Lauch Faircloth, who himself lost in his bid for a second term six years later by John Edwards. In 2004, no incumbent was defeated, as Edwards was running for vice president and was not allowed to be on the ballot in both races. However, that year the seat did change parties for the fifth time in a row, with Richard Burr defeating Bill Clinton's onetime Chief of Staff Erskine Bowles.

== Republican primary ==
=== Candidates ===
- Eddie Burks, Asheboro City Councilman
- Richard Burr, incumbent U.S. Senator
- Brad Jones, businessman
- Larry Linney, former State Representative

=== Polling ===
Poll source	Dates administered	Richard Burr	Brad Jones	Eddie Burks
Public Policy Polling	February 15, 2010	55%	10%	3%
Public Policy Polling	March 12–15, 2010	58%	5%	4%
Public Policy Polling	April 8–11, 2010	67%	7%	3%
Survey USA	April 26, 2010	59%	6%	3%

=== Results ===
Republican primary results
Party	Candidate	Votes	%
Republican	Richard Burr (incumbent)	297,993	80.1%
Republican	Brad Jones	37,616	10.1%
Republican	Eddie Burks	22,111	5.9%
Republican	Larry Linney	14,248	3.8%
Total votes		371,968	100.0%

== Democratic primary ==
=== Candidates ===
From the North Carolina State Board of Elections:

- Cal Cunningham, former State Senator
- Susan Harris, retired accountant
- Ken Lewis, attorney
- Elaine Marshall, North Carolina Secretary of State and candidate in 2002
- Marcus Williams, attorney
- Ann Worthy, former Gaston County Board of Education member

=== Polling ===
Poll source	Dates administered	Elaine Marshall	Cal Cunningham	Kenneth Lewis
Marshall	December 1, 2009	42%	5%	7%
Public Policy Polling	February 15, 2010	29%	12%	5%
Public Policy Polling	March 12–15, 2010	20%	16%	11%
Public Policy Polling	April 8–11, 2010	23%	17%	9%
WRAL-TV/SurveyUSA	April 25, 2010	23%	19%	10%
Public Policy Polling	April 27, 2010	26%	23%	7%
Public Policy Polling	May 1–2, 2010	28%	21%	9%
Rasmussen Reports	May 4, 2010	42%	37%	––
Public Policy Polling	May 8–10, 2010	36%	36%	––

=== Results ===
Primary results by county: Marshall: 20–30%; 30–40%; 40–50%; 50–60%; 60–70%; Cunningham: 20–30%; 30–40%; 40–50%; 50–60%; Lewis: 30–40%; 40–50%; Williams: 30–40%

Democratic primary results – May 4, 2010*
Party	Candidate	Votes	%
Democratic	Elaine Marshall	154,605	36.4%
Democratic	Cal Cunningham	115,851	27.3%
Democratic	Ken Lewis	72,510	17.1%
Democratic	Marcus W. Williams	35,984	8.5%
Democratic	Susan Harris	29,738	7.0%
Democratic	Ann Worthy	16,655	3.9%
Total votes		425,343	100.0%

* Note: Since no candidate received 40% of the vote on May 4, state law allowed a runoff (or "second primary") election if requested by the second-place finisher. Cunningham requested such a runoff.

Runoff results by county: Marshall: 50–60%; 60–70%; 70–80%; Cunningham: 50–60%; 60–70%; 80–90%

Democratic primary runoff results – June 22, 2010
Party	Candidate	Votes	%
Democratic	Elaine Marshall	95,390	60.0%
Democratic	Cal Cunningham	63,691	40.0%
Total votes		159,081	100.0%

== General election ==
=== Candidates ===
- Michael Beitler (L), lecturer of Bryan School of Business and Economics at the University of North Carolina at Greensboro
- Richard Burr (R), incumbent U.S. Senator
- Elaine Marshall (D), North Carolina Secretary of State

=== Campaign ===
Marshall was endorsed by The Charlotte Observer, The Wilmington Star-News, the Elizabeth City Daily Advance and The Southern Pines Pilot. Burr was endorsed by the Greensboro News & Record and the Asheville Citizen-Times.

=== Debates ===
- October 11: Sponsored by the North Carolina Association of Broadcasters Education Foundation and moderated by Carl Kasell. It was televised by UNC-TV in Raleigh.
- October 14: In Raleigh
- October 21: Sponsored by N.C. Association of Broadcasters and moderated by Judy Woodruff in Durham.

=== Predictions ===
Source	Ranking	As of
Cook Political Report	Likely R	October 26, 2010
Rothenberg	Likely R	October 22, 2010
RealClearPolitics	Likely R	October 26, 2010
Sabato's Crystal Ball	Likely R	October 21, 2010
CQ Politics	Likely R	October 26, 2010

=== Polling ===
Poll source	Dates administered	MoE	Richard Burr (R)	Elaine Marshall (D)	Michael Beitler (L)
Public Policy Polling	March 12–15, 2009	± 3.1%	43%	35%	––
Public Policy Polling	August 4–10, 2009	± 3.6%	43%	31%	––
Public Policy Polling	September 2–8, 2009	± 4.0%	42%	31%	––
Rasmussen Reports	September 15, 2009	± 4.5%	48%	38%	––
Public Policy Polling	October 2–4, 2009	± 3.8%	44%	32%	––
Public Policy Polling	November 9–11, 2009	± 3.7%	45%	34%	––
Public Policy Polling	December 11–13, 2009	± 4.0%	42%	37%	––
Public Policy Polling	January 15–18, 2010	± 3.8%	44%	37%	––
Rasmussen Reports	January 27, 2010	± 4.5%	47%	37%	––
Public Policy Polling	February 12–15, 2010	± 3.5%	43%	33%	––
Rasmussen Reports	February 23, 2010	± 4.5%	50%	34%	––
Rasmussen Reports	March 22, 2010	± 4.5%	51%	35%	––
Rasmussen Reports	April 19, 2010	± 4.5%	50%	32%	––
Rasmussen Reports	May 5, 2010	± 4.5%	48%	40%	––
Public Policy Polling	May 8–10, 2010	± 3.9%	43%	42%	––
Rasmussen Reports	June 3, 2010	± 3.0%	50%	36%	––
Public Policy Polling	June 4–6, 2010	± 3.9%	46%	39%	––
Rasmussen Reports	June 23, 2010	± 4.5%	44%	43%	––
SurveyUSA	June 23–24, 2010	± 4.0%	50%	40%	6%
Public Policy Polling	June 26–27, 2010	± 4.4%	38%	33%	10%
Rasmussen Reports	July 6, 2010	± 4.5%	52%	37%	––
Survey USA	July 8–11, 2010	± 4.2%	46%	36%	6%
Lake Research	July 15–19, 2010	± 4.0%	35%	37%	5%
Public Policy Polling	July 27–31, 2010	± 3.9%	39%	37%	7%
Rasmussen Reports	August 3, 2010	± 4.5%	49%	40%	––
Public Policy Polling	August 27–29, 2010	± 3.6%	43%	38%	6%
Rasmussen Reports	September 8, 2010	± 4.5%	54%	38%	––
SurveyUSA	September 14, 2010	± 4.1%	58%	32%	6%
Civitas	September 15–17, 2010	± 4.0%	49%	29%	3%
Public Polling Policy	September 23–26, 2010	± 3.8%	49%	36%	4%
High Point University	September 25–30, 2010	± 5.0%	45%	31%	4%
Rasmussen Reports	October 12, 2010	± 4.5%	52%	38%	––
Public Policy Polling	October 15–17, 2010	± 4.0%	48%	40%	3%
SurveyUSA	October 22–25, 2010	± 4.1%	53%	38%	5%
Public Policy Polling	October 29–31, 2010	± 3.4%	52%	40%	2%

=== Fundraising ===
Candidate (party)	Receipts	Disbursements	Cash on hand	Debt
Richard Burr (R)	$8,444,115	$8,735,725	$1,600,695	$0
Elaine Marshall (D)	$2,561,900	$2,229,840	$329,886	$71,500
Michael Beitler (L)	$16,302	$9,951	$6,350	$11,906
Source: Federal Election Commission

=== Results ===
2010 United States Senate election in North Carolina
Party	Candidate	Votes	%	±%
Republican	Richard Burr (incumbent)	1,458,046	54.81%	+3.21%
Democratic	Elaine Marshall	1,145,074	43.05%	−3.97%
Libertarian	Mike Beitler	55,682	2.09%	+0.72%
Write-in		1,272	0.05%	+0.04%
Total votes		2,660,079	100.00%	N/A
Republican hold				

==== Counties that flipped from Democratic to Republican ====
- Caswell (largest city: Yanceyville)
- Columbus (largest municipality: Whiteville)
- Yancey (largest municipality: Burnsville)
- Perquimans (largest city: Hertford)
- Camden (largest city: Camden)
- Tyrrell (largest municipality: Columbia)
- Guilford (largest city: Greensboro)
- Swain (largest municipality: Cherokee)
- Granville (largest city: Oxford)
- Hyde (largest community: Ocracoke)
- Jackson (largest town: Cullowhee)
- Wake (largest town: Raleigh)

== See also ==
- 2010 North Carolina elections
- 2010 United States House of Representatives elections in North Carolina
