= Natasha Marcus =

American politician (born 1969)

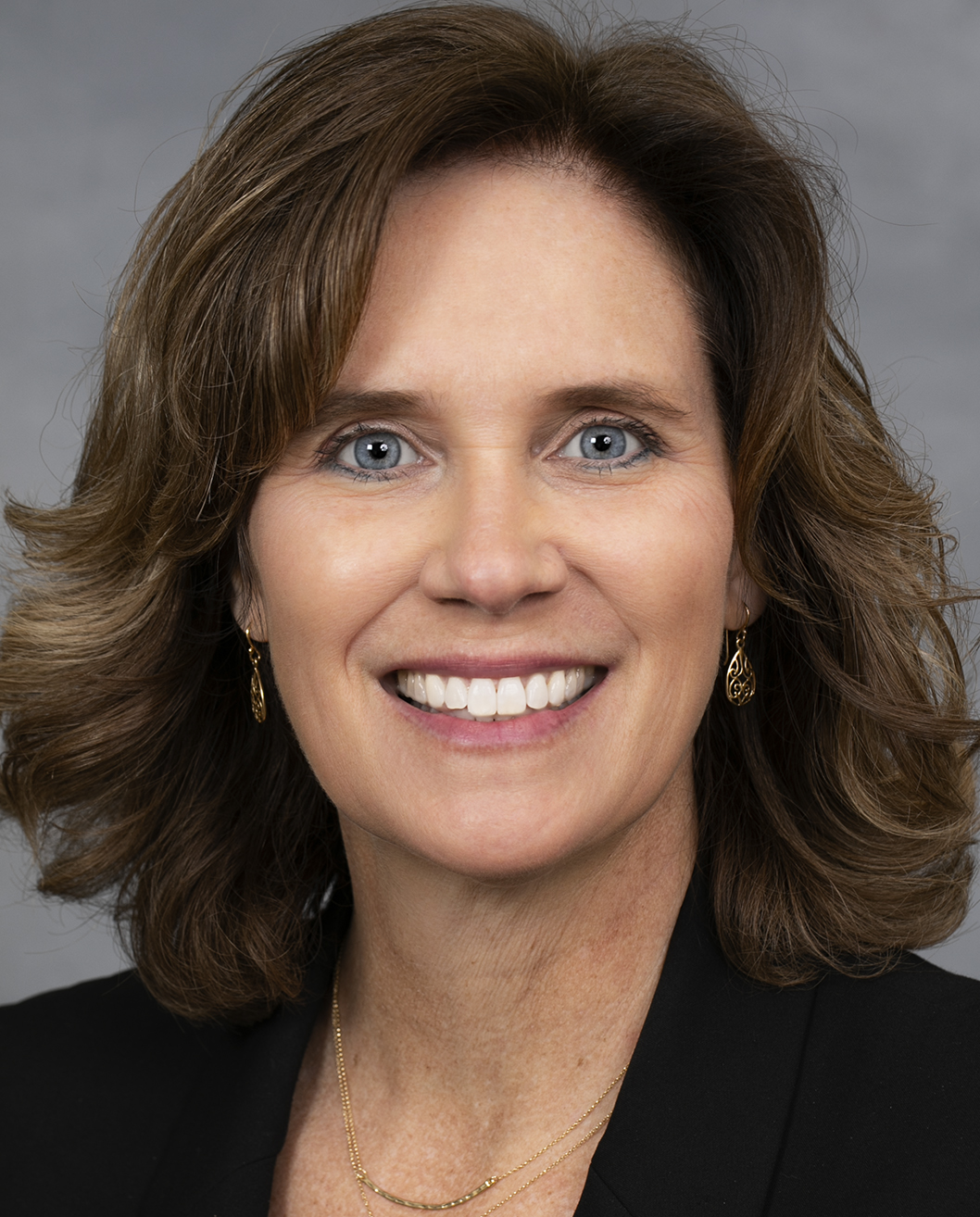

Member of the North Carolina Senate from the 41st district
- In office January 1, 2019 – January 1, 2025
- Preceded by: Jeff Tarte
- Succeeded by: Vickie Sawyer (redistricted)

Personal details
- Born: April 27, 1969 (age 57) Brockport, New York, U.S.
- Party: Democratic
- Spouse: Rob
- Children: 2
- Education: Hamilton College (BA); Duke University (JD)

Natasha Rath Marcus (born April 27, 1969) is a former Democratic member of the North Carolina Senate who represented the 41st district.

== Early life and education ==
Marcus was born on April 27, 1969 in Brockport, New York. She earned her bachelor's degree in public policy from Hamilton College and her Juris Doctor from Duke University School of Law.

== Political career ==
In 2014, Marcus ran unsuccessfully for the North Carolina House of Representatives. Marcus won election to the North Carolina Senate on 6 November 2018 as a member of the Democratic Party. She secured 57 percent of the vote, while her opponent, Republican incumbent Jeff Tarte, secured 43 percent. During her tenure, Marcus has pushed to expand access to abortion in North Carolina, and signed on in 2021 to the proposed "RBG Act". She has served on several committees in the Senate, including the Commerce & Insurance Committee.

In 2023, Marcus announced she would run for North Carolina Commissioner of Insurance in the 2024 election. She won her primary to become the Democratic nominee.

=== Electoral history ===
==== 2024 ====
North Carolina Commissioner of Insurance Democratic primary election, 2024
Party	Candidate	Votes	%
Democratic	Natasha Marcus	506,592	77.63%
Democratic	David Wheeler	145,991	22.37%
Total votes		652,583	100%

North Carolina Commissioner of Insurance general election, 2024
Party	Candidate	Votes	%
Republican	Mike Causey (incumbent)	2,883,996	52.12%
Democratic	Natasha Marcus	2,649,353	47.88%
Total votes		5,533,349	100%
Republican hold			

==== 2022 ====
North Carolina Senate 41st district general election, 2022
Party	Candidate	Votes	%
Democratic	Natasha Marcus (incumbent)	46,358	66.52%
Republican	Bonni Leone	23,331	33.48%
Total votes		69,689	100%
Democratic hold			

==== 2020 ====
North Carolina Senate 41st district general election, 2020
Party	Candidate	Votes	%
Democratic	Natasha Marcus (incumbent)	82,741	71.93%
Constitution	Christopher Cole	32,295	28.07%
Total votes		115,036	100%
Democratic hold			

==== 2018 ====
North Carolina Senate 41st district general election, 2018
Party	Candidate	Votes	%
Democratic	Natasha Marcus	49,459	56.85%
Republican	Jeff Tarte (incumbent)	37,536	43.15%
Total votes		86,995	100%
Democratic gain from Republican			

==== 2014 ====
North Carolina House of Representatives 98th district general election, 2014
Party	Candidate	Votes	%
Republican	John Bradford	14,558	54.98%
Democratic	Natasha Marcus	11,922	45.02%
Total votes		26,480	100%
Republican hold			

== Personal life ==
Marcus lives in Davidson, North Carolina and is divorced from her former husband, Rob Marcus. She has two adult children.

Party political offices
Preceded by Wayne Goodwin	Democratic nominee for Insurance Commissioner of North Carolina; 2024	Most recent
