= John May =

John May may refer to:

== Business ==
- John May (angel investor), manager of Business Angel investment groups
- John May (shipwright) (1694–1779), English shipwright in Dutch service
- John May (youth worker) (born 1964), chief executive of Career Academies UK and member of the World Scout Committee
- John C. May, president and CEO of John Deere

== Clergy ==
- John May (bishop) (died 1598), Bishop of Carlisle
- John May (priest) (died 1893), Dean of St George's Cathedral, Georgetown, Guyana
- John L. May (1922–1994), Archbishop of St Louis

== Politics ==
- John May (Australian politician) (1844–1917), member of the Queensland Legislative Assembly
- John May (North Carolina politician) (1950–2017), member of the North Carolina legislature

== Sport ==
- Jack May (tennis) (1925–2012), Australian tennis player
- John May (Australian footballer) (born 1951), Australian footballer who played for Essendon
- John May (cricketer) (1845–?), English cricketer
- John May (footballer, born 1878) (1878–1933), footballer who played for Rangers FC

== Other ==
- John May (1744–1790), founder of Maysville, Kentucky
- John May (gangster), car mechanic for the Moran gang, killed in the Saint Valentine's Day Massacre
- John May (judge) (1923–1997), British judge who headed the May Inquiry into "Maguire Seven" miscarriage of justice
- John May (Medal of Honor) (1836–1886), American soldier and Medal of Honor recipient
- John May (police officer) (1775–1856), superintendent in the London Metropolitan Police
- John Wilder May (1819–1883), American judge
- John May (V), episode of the 2009 miniseries V

== See also ==
- Johnny May (born 1945), Canadian Inuk bush pilot
- May (surname)
- Jack May (1922–1997), English actor
- J. Peter May (Jon Peter May, born 1939), American mathematician
