= North Carolina's 49th House district =

American legislative district

North Carolina's 49th State House of Representatives district
Representative
Cynthia Ball; D–Raleigh
- Demographics: 68% White; 13% Black; 7% Hispanic; 7% Asian; 4% Multiracial
- Population (2024): 84,653

North Carolina's 49th House district is one of 120 districts in the North Carolina House of Representatives. It has been represented by Democrat Cynthia Ball since 2017.

== Geography ==
Since 2013, the district has included parts of west central Wake County. The district overlaps with the 15th and 16th Senate districts.

== District officeholders ==
Representative	Party	Dates	Notes	Counties
District created January 1, 1983.
Bob Hunter (Marion)	Democratic	January 1, 1983 – July 7, 1998	Redistricted from the 41st district. Resigned to become North Carolina Court of Appeals Judge.	1983–1993; All of Yancey and McDowell counties.
Bob Hunter (Marion)	Democratic	January 1, 1983 – July 7, 1998	Redistricted from the 41st district. Resigned to become North Carolina Court of Appeals Judge.	1993–2003; All of Yancey and McDowell counties. Part of Burke County.
Vacant		July 7, 1998 – July 8, 1998		1993–2003; All of Yancey and McDowell counties. Part of Burke County.
Annette Bryant (Marion)	Democratic	July 8, 1998 – January 1, 1999	Appointed to finish Hunter's term.	1993–2003; All of Yancey and McDowell counties. Part of Burke County.
Mitch Gillespie (Marion)	Republican	January 1, 1999 – January 1, 2003	Redistricted to the 85th district.	1993–2003; All of Yancey and McDowell counties. Part of Burke County.
Lucy Allen (Louisburg)	Democratic	January 1, 2003 – April 6, 2010	Resigned.	2003–2005; All of Franklin County. Parts of Warren and Halifax counties.
Lucy Allen (Louisburg)	Democratic	January 1, 2003 – April 6, 2010	Resigned.	2005–2013; All of Franklin County. Parts of Nash and Halifax counties.
Vacant		April 6, 2010 – April 21, 2010		2005–2013; All of Franklin County. Parts of Nash and Halifax counties.
John May (Louisburg)	Democratic	April 21, 2010 – January 1, 2011	Appointed to finish Allen's term. Lost re-election.	2005–2013; All of Franklin County. Parts of Nash and Halifax counties.
Glen Bradley (Youngsville)	Republican	January 1, 2011 – January 1, 2013	Redistricted to the 25th district and retired to run for State Senate.	2005–2013; All of Franklin County. Parts of Nash and Halifax counties.
Jim Fulghum (Raleigh)	Republican	January 1, 2013 – July 19, 2014	Died.	2013–Present; Part of Wake County.
Vacant		July 19, 2014 – August 19, 2014		2013–Present; Part of Wake County.
Gary Pendleton (Raleigh)	Republican	August 19, 2014 – January 1, 2017	Appointed to finish Fulghum's term. Lost re-election.	2013–Present; Part of Wake County.
Cynthia Ball (Raleigh)	Democratic	January 1, 2017 – Present		2013–Present; Part of Wake County.

== Election results ==
=== 2024 ===
North Carolina House of Representatives 49th district general election, 2024
Party	Candidate	Votes	%
Democratic	Cynthia Ball (incumbent)	32,814	100%
Total votes		32,814	100%
Democratic hold			

=== 2022 ===
North Carolina House of Representatives 49th district general election, 2022
Party	Candidate	Votes	%
Democratic	Cynthia Ball (incumbent)	22,519	67.77%
Republican	David Robertson	9,764	29.38%
Libertarian	Michael Oakes	946	2.85%
Total votes		33,229	100%
Democratic hold			

=== 2020 ===
North Carolina House of Representatives 49th district general election, 2020
Party	Candidate	Votes	%
Democratic	Cynthia Ball (incumbent)	37,807	65.05%
Republican	David Robertson	17,564	30.22%
Libertarian	Dee Watson	2,752	4.73%
Total votes		58,123	100%
Democratic hold			

=== 2018 ===
North Carolina House of Representatives 49th district general election, 2018
Party	Candidate	Votes	%
Democratic	Cynthia Ball (incumbent)	27,538	66.27%
Republican	David Robertson	12,929	31.11%
Libertarian	Jonathan Horst	1,086	2.61%
Total votes		41,553	100%
Democratic hold			

=== 2016 ===
North Carolina House of Representatives 49th district general election, 2016
Party	Candidate	Votes	%
Democratic	Cynthia Ball	26,975	48.67%
Republican	Gary Pendleton (incumbent)	26,155	47.19%
Libertarian	David Ulmer	2,299	4.15%
Total votes		55,429	100%
Democratic gain from Republican			

=== 2014 ===
North Carolina House of Representatives 49th district Democratic primary election, 2014
Party	Candidate	Votes	%
Democratic	Kim Hanchette	4,700	76.48%
Democratic	Derek Kiszely	1,445	23.52%
Total votes		6,145	100%

North Carolina House of Representatives 49th district general election, 2014
Party	Candidate	Votes	%
Republican	Gary Pendleton (incumbent)	20,588	51.63%
Democratic	Kim Hanchette	19,290	48.37%
Total votes		39,878	100%
Republican hold			

=== 2012 ===
North Carolina House of Representatives 49th district Republican primary election, 2012
Party	Candidate	Votes	%
Republican	Jim Fulghum	8,300	65.86%
Republican	Russell Capps	4,303	34.14%
Total votes		12,603	100%

North Carolina House of Representatives 49th district general election, 2012
Party	Candidate	Votes	%
Republican	Jim Fulghum	28,300	53.97%
Democratic	Keith Karlsson	24,134	46.03%
Total votes		52,434	100%
Republican win (new seat)			

=== 2010 ===
North Carolina House of Representatives 49th district general election, 2010
Party	Candidate	Votes	%
Republican	Glen Bradley	11,276	51.68%
Democratic	John May (incumbent)	10,544	48.32%
Total votes		21,820	100%
Republican gain from Democratic			

=== 2008 ===
North Carolina House of Representatives 49th district general election, 2008
Party	Candidate	Votes	%
Democratic	Lucy Allen (incumbent)	19,598	58.59%
Republican	Keith Shearon	13,852	41.41%
Total votes		33,450	100%
Democratic hold			

=== 2006 ===
North Carolina House of Representatives 49th district general election, 2006
Party	Candidate	Votes	%
Democratic	Lucy Allen (incumbent)	9,173	59.22%
Republican	Dave Harker	6,316	40.78%
Total votes		15,489	100%
Democratic hold			

=== 2004 ===
North Carolina House of Representatives 49th district general election, 2004
Party	Candidate	Votes	%
Democratic	Lucy Allen (incumbent)	15,121	56.66%
Republican	Renee McCormick	11,567	43.34%
Total votes		26,688	100%
Democratic hold			

=== 2002 ===
North Carolina House of Representatives 49th district Democratic primary election, 2002
Party	Candidate	Votes	%
Democratic	Lucy Allen	5,650	59.37%
Democratic	Phillip W. Taylor	3,866	40.63%
Total votes		9,516	100%

North Carolina House of Representatives 49th district general election, 2002
Party	Candidate	Votes	%
Democratic	Lucy Allen	10,885	52.45%
Republican	Renee McCormick	9,288	44.75%
Libertarian	Gregg Adelman	580	2.79%
Total votes		20,753	100%
Democratic win (new seat)			

=== 2000 ===
North Carolina House of Representatives 49th district Democratic primary election, 2000 (Note: Bryant and Huskins faced off in a primary run-off election, which was won by Huskins. Results are unavailable.)
Party	Candidate	Votes	%
Democratic	Annette Bryant	1,464	35.61%
Democratic	David Huskins	1,388	33.76%
Democratic	Everette Clark	1,259	30.63%
Total votes		4,111	100%

North Carolina House of Representatives 49th district general election, 2000
Party	Candidate	Votes	%
Republican	Mitch Gillespie (incumbent)	14,174	60.34%
Democratic	David Huskins	9,315	39.66%
Total votes		23,489	100%
Republican hold			
