= North Carolina's 35th House district =

American legislative district

North Carolina's 35th State House of Representatives district
Representative
| Mike Schietzelt; R–Wake Forest |
- Demographics: 70% White; 15% Black; 8% Hispanic; 3% Asian; 4% Multiracial
- Population (2024): 88,212

North Carolina's 35th House district is one of 120 districts in the North Carolina House of Representatives. It has been represented by Republican Mike Schietzelt since 2025.

== Geography ==
Since 2003, the district has included part of Wake County. The district overlaps with the 18th Senate district.

== District officeholders ==
=== Multi-member district ===
| Representative | Party | Dates | Notes | Representative | Party | Dates | Notes | Counties |
|---|---|---|---|---|---|---|---|---|
District created January 1, 1967.
| Dwight Quinn (Kannapolis) | Democratic | January 1, 1967 – January 1, 1973 | Redistricted from the Cabarrus County district. Redistricted to the 33rd district. | James Johnson Jr. (Concord) | Republican | January 1, 1967 – January 1, 1973 | | 1967–1973; All of Cabarrus County. |
| J. P. Huskins (Statesville) | Democratic | January 1, 1973 – January 1, 1983 | Redistricted from the 39th district. Redistricted to the 42nd district. | Homer Tolbert (Cleveland) | Republican | January 1, 1973 – January 1, 1975 | | 1973–1983; All of Alexander and Iredell counties. |
| J. P. Huskins (Statesville) | Democratic | January 1, 1973 – January 1, 1983 | Redistricted from the 39th district. Redistricted to the 42nd district. | William McMillan (Statesville) | Democratic | January 1, 1975 – January 1, 1981 | | 1973–1983; All of Alexander and Iredell counties. |
| J. P. Huskins (Statesville) | Democratic | January 1, 1973 – January 1, 1983 | Redistricted from the 39th district. Redistricted to the 42nd district. | Robert Brawley (Mooresville) | Republican | January 1, 1981 – January 1, 1983 | Redistricted to the 43rd district. | 1973–1983; All of Alexander and Iredell counties. |
| Robie Nash (Salisbury) | Democratic | January 1, 1983 – January 1, 1985 | Redistricted from the 31st district. | Bradford Ligon (Salisbury) | Republican | January 1, 1983 – January 1, 1993 | Redistricted from the 31st district. Redistricted to the 83rd district and retired. | 1983–1993; All of Rowan County. |
| Charlotte Gardner (Salisbury) | Republican | January 1, 1985 – January 1, 1993 | Redistricted to the single-member district. | Bradford Ligon (Salisbury) | Republican | January 1, 1983 – January 1, 1993 | Redistricted from the 31st district. Redistricted to the 83rd district and retired. | 1983–1993; All of Rowan County. |

=== Single-member district ===
| Representative | Party | Dates | Notes | Counties |
|---|---|---|---|---|
| Charlotte Gardner (Salisbury) | Republican | January 1, 1993 – January 1, 2001 | Redistricted from the multi-member district Lost re-election. | 1993–2003; Part of Rowan County. |
| Lorene Coates (Salisbury) | Democratic | January 1, 2001 – January 1, 2003 | Redistricted to the 77th district. | 1993–2003; Part of Rowan County. |
| Jennifer Weiss (Cary) | Democratic | January 1, 2003 – January 1, 2013 | Redistricted from the 63rd district. Redistricted to the 11th district and retired. | 2003–Present; Part of Wake County. |
| Chris Malone (Wake Forest) | Republican | January 1, 2013 – January 1, 2019 | Lost re-election. | 2003–Present; Part of Wake County. |
| Terence Everitt (Wake Forest) | Democratic | January 1, 2019 – January 1, 2025 | Retired to run for State Senate. | 2003–Present; Part of Wake County. |
| Mike Schietzelt (Wake Forest) | Republican | January 1, 2025 – Present | | 2003–Present; Part of Wake County. |

== Election results ==
=== 2026 ===
North Carolina House of Representatives 35th district Republican primary election, 2026
| Party | Candidate | Votes | % |
|---|---|---|---|
| Republican | Mike Schietzelt (incumbent) | 5,047 | 90.99% |
| Republican | Michele Joyner-Dinwiddie | 500 | 9.01% |
| Total votes | | 5,547 | 100% |

North Carolina House of Representatives 35th district general election, 2026
| Party | Candidate | Votes | % |
|---|---|---|---|
| Republican | Mike Schietzelt (incumbent) | | |
| Democratic | Evonne Hopkins | | |
| Total votes | | | 100% |

=== 2024 ===
North Carolina House of Representatives 35th district Republican primary election, 2024
| Party | Candidate | Votes | % |
|---|---|---|---|
| Republican | Mike Schietzelt | 6,366 | 64.82% |
| Republican | James Norman | 3,455 | 35.18% |
| Total votes | | 9,821 | 100% |

North Carolina House of Representatives 35th district general election, 2024
| Party | Candidate | Votes | % |
|---|---|---|---|
| Republican | Mike Schietzelt | 28,651 | 50.27% |
| Democratic | Evonne Hopkins | 26,831 | 47.08% |
| Libertarian | Michael Oakes | 1,513 | 2.65% |
| Total votes | | 56,995 | 100% |
| Republican gain from Democratic | | | |

=== 2022 ===
North Carolina House of Representatives 35th district Republican primary election, 2022
| Party | Candidate | Votes | % |
|---|---|---|---|
| Republican | Fred Von Canon | 4,602 | 79.45% |
| Republican | Brandon Panameno | 1,190 | 20.55% |
| Total votes | | 5,792 | 100% |

North Carolina House of Representatives 35th district general election, 2022
| Party | Candidate | Votes | % |
|---|---|---|---|
| Democratic | Terence Everitt (incumbent) | 19,313 | 51.99% |
| Republican | Fred Von Canon | 17,106 | 46.05% |
| Libertarian | Joseph Serio | 728 | 1.96% |
| Total votes | | 37,147 | 100% |
| Democratic hold | | | |

=== 2020 ===
North Carolina House of Representatives 35th district Republican primary election, 2020
| Party | Candidate | Votes | % |
|---|---|---|---|
| Republican | Fred Von Canon | 4,847 | 70.81% |
| Republican | Alma Peters | 1,998 | 29.19% |
| Total votes | | 6,845 | 100% |

North Carolina House of Representatives 35th district general election, 2020
| Party | Candidate | Votes | % |
|---|---|---|---|
| Democratic | Terence Everitt (incumbent) | 31,630 | 50.67% |
| Republican | Fred Von Canon | 28,528 | 45.70% |
| Libertarian | Michael Nelson | 2,262 | 3.63% |
| Total votes | | 62,420 | 100% |
| Democratic hold | | | |

=== 2018 ===
North Carolina House of Representatives 35th district Democratic primary election, 2018
| Party | Candidate | Votes | % |
|---|---|---|---|
| Democratic | Terence Everitt | 3,926 | 81.67% |
| Democratic | Adam B. Wright | 881 | 18.33% |
| Total votes | | 4,807 | 100% |

North Carolina House of Representatives 35th district Republican primary election, 2018
| Party | Candidate | Votes | % |
|---|---|---|---|
| Republican | Chris Malone (incumbent) | 1,651 | 54.18% |
| Republican | Isaac Burke | 1,396 | 45.82% |
| Total votes | | 3,047 | 100% |

North Carolina House of Representatives 35th district general election, 2018
| Party | Candidate | Votes | % |
|---|---|---|---|
| Democratic | Terence Everitt | 23,187 | 51.09% |
| Republican | Chris Malone (incumbent) | 20,668 | 45.54% |
| Libertarian | Michael Nelson | 1,532 | 3.38% |
| Total votes | | 45,387 | 100% |
| Democratic gain from Republican | | | |

=== 2016 ===
North Carolina House of Representatives 35th district general election, 2016
| Party | Candidate | Votes | % |
|---|---|---|---|
| Republican | Chris Malone (incumbent) | 25,117 | 53.14% |
| Democratic | Terence Everitt | 22,145 | 46.86% |
| Total votes | | 47,262 | 100% |
| Republican hold | | | |

=== 2014 ===
North Carolina House of Representatives 35th district general election, 2014
| Party | Candidate | Votes | % |
|---|---|---|---|
| Republican | Chris Malone (incumbent) | 15,891 | 56.30% |
| Democratic | Brian Mountcastle | 12,336 | 43.70% |
| Total votes | | 28,227 | 100% |
| Republican hold | | | |

=== 2012 ===
North Carolina House of Representatives 35th district Republican primary election, 2012
| Party | Candidate | Votes | % |
|---|---|---|---|
| Republican | Chris Malone | 4,973 | 56.79% |
| Republican | Duane Cutlip | 3,784 | 43.21% |
| Total votes | | 8,757 | 100% |

North Carolina House of Representatives 35th district general election, 2012
| Party | Candidate | Votes | % |
|---|---|---|---|
| Republican | Chris Malone | 20,435 | 50.82% |
| Democratic | Lori B. Millberg | 19,778 | 49.18% |
| Total votes | | 40,213 | 100% |
| Republican win (new seat) | | | |

=== 2010 ===
North Carolina House of Representatives 35th district general election, 2010
| Party | Candidate | Votes | % |
|---|---|---|---|
| Democratic | Jennifer Weiss (incumbent) | 13,144 | 57.48% |
| Republican | Don Frantz | 9,725 | 42.52% |
| Total votes | | 22,869 | 100% |
| Democratic hold | | | |

=== 2008 ===
North Carolina House of Representatives 35th district general election, 2008
| Party | Candidate | Votes | % |
|---|---|---|---|
| Democratic | Jennifer Weiss (incumbent) | 23,633 | 65.10% |
| Republican | Eric Weaver | 12,667 | 34.90% |
| Total votes | | 36,300 | 100% |
| Democratic hold | | | |

=== 2006 ===
North Carolina House of Representatives 35th district general election, 2006
| Party | Candidate | Votes | % |
|---|---|---|---|
| Democratic | Jennifer Weiss (incumbent) | 13,157 | 100% |
| Total votes | | 13,157 | 100% |
| Democratic hold | | | |

=== 2004 ===
North Carolina House of Representatives 35th district general election, 2004
| Party | Candidate | Votes | % |
|---|---|---|---|
| Democratic | Jennifer Weiss (incumbent) | 22,899 | 88.86% |
| Libertarian | Graham Yarko Thomas | 2,870 | 11.14% |
| Total votes | | 25,769 | 100% |
| Democratic hold | | | |

=== 2002 ===
North Carolina House of Representatives 35th district Democratic primary election, 2002
| Party | Candidate | Votes | % |
|---|---|---|---|
| Democratic | Jennifer Weiss (incumbent) | 5,410 | 82.46% |
| Democratic | Daniel A. Young Sr. | 1,151 | 17.54% |
| Total votes | | 6,561 | 100% |

North Carolina House of Representatives 35th district general election, 2002
| Party | Candidate | Votes | % |
|---|---|---|---|
| Democratic | Jennifer Weiss (incumbent) | 12,907 | 52.82% |
| Republican | Darryl Black | 10,757 | 44.02% |
| Libertarian | Linda Ellis | 771 | 3.16% |
| Total votes | | 24,435 | 100% |
| Democratic hold | | | |

=== 2000 ===
North Carolina House of Representatives 35th district general election, 2000
| Party | Candidate | Votes | % |
|---|---|---|---|
| Democratic | Lorene Coates | 11,026 | 52.04% |
| Republican | Charlotte Gardner (incumbent) | 10,163 | 47.96% |
| Total votes | | 21,189 | 100% |
| Democratic gain from Republican | | | |
