= John May (angel investor) =

American venture capitalist

- Education: Earlham College (BA); Maxwell School, Syracuse University (MPA)
- Occupations: Venture capitalist, angel investor
- Known for: Founding angel investor groups in the Washington, D.C. area Chairman Emeritus, Angel Capital Association
- Notable work: Every Business Needs an Angel (2001); Angels Without Borders (2015)
- Title: Managing Partner, New Vantage Group
- Awards: Hans Severiens Award (2010)

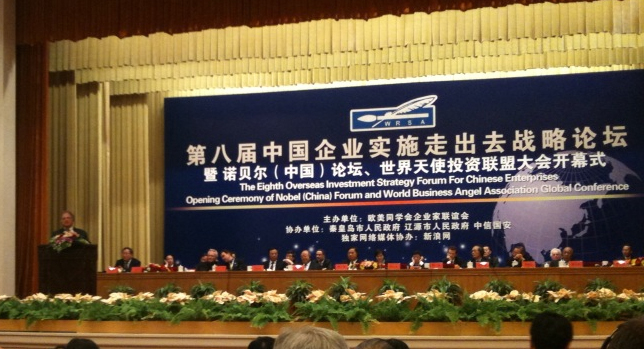
John May addressing the WBAA Global Conference, 2009

John May is an American venture capitalist, the Managing Partner of the New Vantage Group, which has organized five angel investing organizations in the Washington, D.C. area since 1999, placing funds into more than 50 companies.

== Biography ==
May is the co-author of two books on angel investing, Every Business Needs an Angel and State of the Art: An Executive Briefing on Cutting-Edge Practices in American Angel Investing. May is Chairman Emeritus of the Angel Capital Association and former Co-Chairman of the World Business Angel Association. He is a lead instructor for the "Power of Angel Investing" seminar produced by the Angel Resource Institute and supported by the Ewing Marion Kauffman Foundation, a Batten Fellow at the Darden Graduate School of Business Administration at the University of Virginia and a Managing Director of Seraphim, a UK-based venture capital fund. May also served on the board of directors of the Mid-Atlantic Venture Association, the trade association for the venture capital industry in the Mid-Atlantic region.

May began his work in angel investing when he co-founded the Investors' Circle, a network of over 200 investors who use private capital to fund businesses that address social and environmental issues. May co-founded The Dinner Club, an investment group of 60 Washington, D.C. angel investors who collectively invested in regional early-stage ventures. A larger private investor pool, the eMedia Club with 75 members, followed it, and in 2000, the Washington Dinner Club. In 2003, May launched Active Angel Investors and in 2008 he created D’ArchAngels, a group of accredited investors in the Mid-Atlantic region with significant expertise in the intelligence and defense industries. In 2012, Active Angel Investors merged with another DC-area investors group, New Dominion Angels, of which May is a Co-Managing Partner.

Washingtonian Magazine named May one of its 100 Tech Titans of DC. At the Angel Capital Association Summit in San Francisco, CA on May 6, 2010, May was awarded the 2010 Hans Severiens Award for contributions to the angel investing industry.

In 2015, May co-edited, with Mannie Liu (Chinese Academy of Sciences, China), the book Angel Without Borders: Trends and Policies Shaping Angel Investment Worldwide (World Scientific Press: Singapore).

In 2016, May was selected as Co-Chairman of the newly formed Global Business Angel Network.

May holds a BA from Earlham College and an MPA from the Maxwell School at Syracuse University. He has two adult children and resides in McLean, Virginia.
