= Hong Kong Feature =

Hong Kong media outlet

- Type: News outlet
- Founder: Kwan Chun-hoi
- Founded: 1 July 2019; 6 years ago
- Language: Traditional Chinese
- Headquarters: 44 Sai Yeung Choi Street South, Mong Kok (2020–2022)
- Website: hkfeature.com

Hong Kong Feature (Chinese: 誌) is a Hong Kong news outlet established in 2019. Founded by former Ming Pao editor Kwan Chun-hoi during the 2019–2020 Hong Kong protests, the outlet began operating through citizen journalism and focuses on feature stories about Hong Kong. Initially functioning as a news website, it launched a print magazine Side B through reader subscriptions starting in March 2021. The outlet also owned a physical bookstore Hong Kong Feature Territory (言志區) from 2020 to 2022, which served as its headquarters.

== History ==
=== Establishment during the 2019–2020 Hong Kong protests (2019–2020) ===
In February 2019, former Apple Daily investigative journalist and Ming Pao editor Kwan Chun-hoi resigned from Ming Pao Weekly and left mainstream media after a twelve-year career. He cited his departure due to diminishing press freedom in Hong Kong, noting that most media outlets had shut down investigative teams after 2014 and instead focused mainly on instant news and growth editing, contrary to his aspiration to become a journalist. He initially planned to start a culture magazine-like media outlet to focus on overlooked individuals and cultural elements in society. Following the outbreak of the 2019–2020 Hong Kong protests, Kwan served as an independent journalist early in the protests and took a photo of a notable standoff between police and protestors outside the Hong Kong Police Headquarters, which was widely cited afterward. He officially founded Hong Kong Feature on 1 July 2019, publishing in-depth feature stories about Hong Kong. He aimed to focus on interviews and field reporting to provide historical records, in contrast to the rising trend of tabloid journalism.

The outlet operated with an initial fund of US$77,000 (~HK$600,000), financed by Kwan's life savings, and operated under HK Feature Limited, a company formed by Kwan. In its early days, the outlet consisted of Kwan and two other journalists, and relied on a group of freelance citizen journalists trained by Kwan, whom he considered equally capable as traditional journalists, as both must adhere to journalistic ethics and serve as the fourth estate to monitor the government. He named the outlet "誌", which means "records" in ancient Chinese and is a combination of the characters for "words" (言) and "spirit" (志), interpreted by Kwan as "recording one's spirit with words". The outlet also published a community paper on 1 July coinciding with its establishment, themed around the Storming of the Legislative Council Complex. In the same month, Kwan and another journalist Chan Cheuk-sze went to Yuen Long Station to report on the 2019 Yuen Long attack. In August, the outlet gained public attention for a video feature interviewing toll staff members of the Cross-Harbour Tunnel about the protestors who allowed cars to pass through for free, which balanced the viewpoints of both staff and protestors, and the video attracted over 440,000 views by October.

By October 2019, Hong Kong Feature had three full-time staff members and primarily relied on citizen journalists for frontline coverage, operating from a small studio at an industrial building. A crowdfunding campaign aiming for HK$1.5 million was launched that month, with Kwan stating it would mainly fund a documentary about the 2019–2020 Hong Kong protests and establish an online historical archive about Hong Kong, along with plans to hold training sessions for citizen journalists. In November, the outlet successfully crowdfunded HK$250,000, publishing a non-fiction journal Hong Kong Road (Chinese: 香港大道) and producing a documentary Eternal Springs in the Mountains (中大保衛戰) covering the Siege of the Chinese University of Hong Kong. However, the documentary could not secure a screening permit from the Office for Film, Newspaper, and Article Administration. After stabilizing operations, the outlet opened the physical bookstore Hong Kong Feature Territory (言志區) at Sai Heung Choi Street South, Mong Kok in 2020. The bookstore also functioned as a publisher and offered various local products for sale, including clothing, food, and handicrafts. Kwan reasoned that the establishment of the bookstore was to generate revenue to cover the outlet's expenses. Reading clubs and film screenings were held at the bookstore as well, with Kwan expressing a desire to enhance cultural connections within the community.

=== Expansion (2021–present) ===
In 2021, the outlet expanded its website, leading to a financial deficit. As of March 2021, the outlet had about 60,000 followers on Facebook and 20,000 followers on Instagram. A subscription model was launched starting 12 March, with a monthly fee of HK$86, accumulating about 400 subscribers along with five full-time journalists by July. Digital wallets were also linked to the writers' bylines on the website, allowing readers to fund journalists directly. By September 2021, the outlet had approximately 600 subscribers and around two dozen citizen journalists. A full subscription model was launched the following year, inspired by independent media outlets from China and Myanmar.

On 23 January 2022, the physical bookstore Hong Kong Feature Territory was closed. In March, the outlet launched a print magazine titled Side B, focusing on social issues. The second edition, published in August, featured interviews with Ukrainians on the frontline of the Russo-Ukrainian War and a retrospective on pre-handover Hong Kong cinema. In December, the outlet published a non-fiction journal titled Deaf Voice in Court, featuring in-depth investigations into six court cases involving hearing-impaired individuals that journalists spent three years researching, including HKSAR v. Law Chun Kit in 2019, to reveal the problems in legal interpretations for the hearing-impaired. Over 30 talks were held at independent bookstores that year to promote the book and raise awareness about the judicial rights of disabled individuals.

In July 2023, a public survey conducted by Flow Magazine ranked the outlet fourth out of 19 major Hong Kong media outlets established before 2020 Hong Kong national security law, with a score of 2.82/5. In October 2023, the outlet published another non-fiction journal titled Hong Kong Craftsman (香港職人), featuring interviews with 25 local craftsmen conducted over two years. Alexander Cheung of Ming Pao found the book reflects on the swift disappearance of traditional artisans and celebrates their enduring skills and the vibrant legacy they leave behind, evoking a sense of inspiration. In September, Hong Kong Feature was one of 15 pro-democratic media outlets in Hong Kong whose journalists and their families received defamatory letters and death threats from individuals claiming to be patriots.
