= Jennifer Weiss =

Jennifer Weiss may refer to:

- Jennifer Weiss (politician) (born 1959), American politician
- Jennifer Weiss (producer), Canadian film producer
