= Charles May (police officer) =

British police officer in Hong Kong (died 1879)

- Born: Charles May c. 1818; London, England
- Died: 25 April 1879; At sea, near Singapore
- Resting place: Buried at sea
- Known for: First head of the Hong Kong Police Force (1845); Head of the Hong Kong Fire Brigade (1868)
- Spouse: Harriet
- Police career
- Country: Hong Kong Police Force
- Allegiance: United Kingdom
- Department: Metropolitan Police (UK); Hong Kong Police Force
- Service years: 1835–1845 (Metropolitan Police); 1845–1862 (Hong Kong Police)
- Status: Deceased
- Rank: Captain Superintendent (Hong Kong Police)
- Other work: Police Magistrate, Acting Colonial Treasurer, Superintendent of the Fire Brigade (Hong Kong)

Charles May (1818?–1879) was a British police officer who spent 34 years in colonial service in Hong Kong, where he served as the first head of the Hong Kong Police Force (1845) and head of the Hong Kong Fire Brigade (now Hong Kong Fire Service) in 1868.

== Life and career ==
He was born in London to John May, Superintendent of A Division of the Metropolitan Police. May himself joined that force on 7 November 1835 with his father as his sole referee, rising to Sergeant on 21 November 1837 and Inspector on 7 June 1839 before leaving England for Hong Kong, arriving on 28 February 1845 and remaining its Captain Superintendent of Police until 1862.

May remained in the colony, serving in various other posts such as Police Magistrate, Acting Colonial Treasurer and Superintendent of the Fire Brigade. May left Hong Kong on 22 April 1879 but died at sea near Singapore on 25 April 1879. Buried at sea, he is noted on the family tomb at Kensal Green Cemetery.

May was survived by his wife Harriet and daughter.

== See also ==
- May House (Hong Kong)
