= Chad Barefoot =

American politician (born 1983)

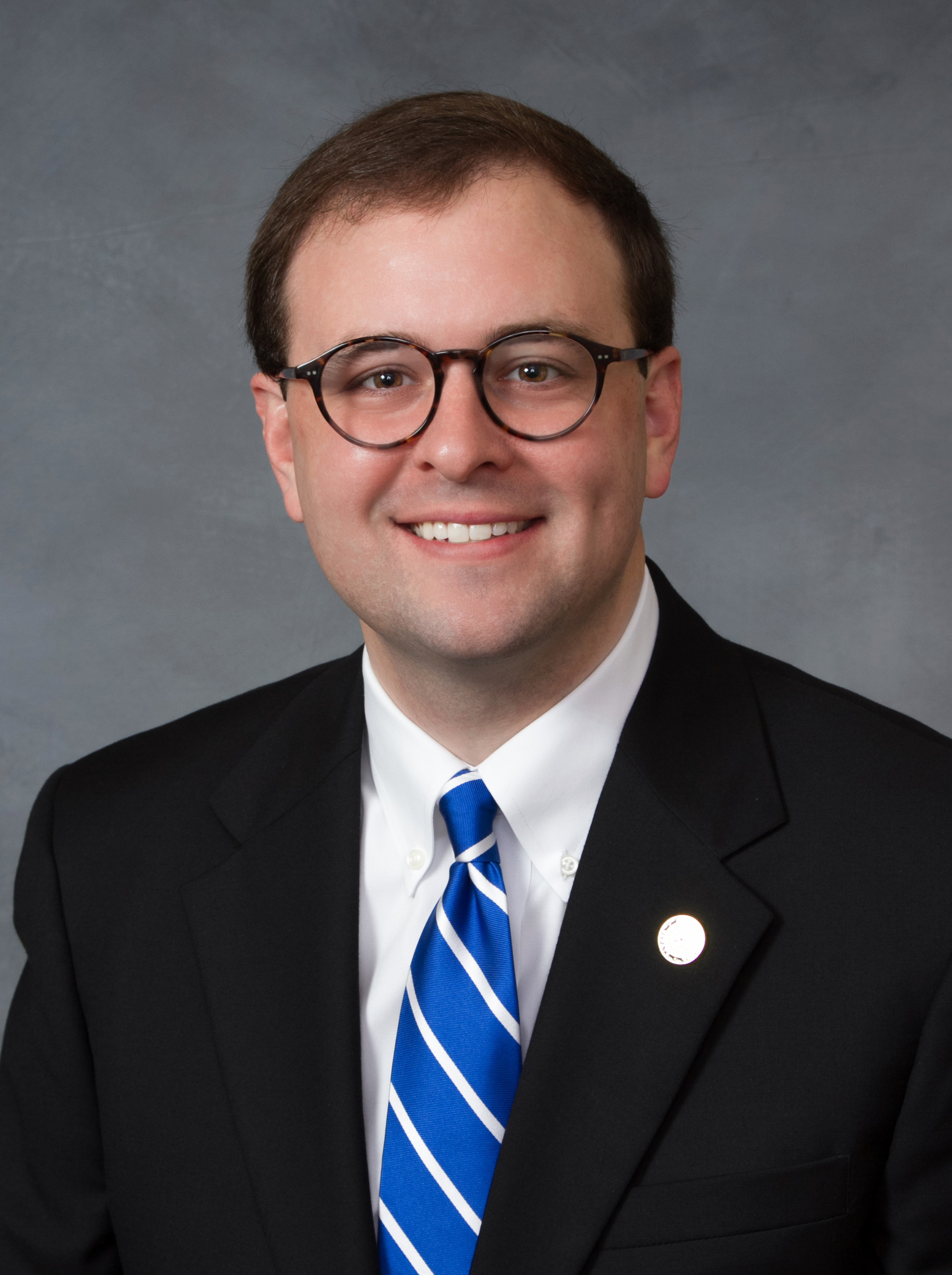

Member of the North Carolina Senate from the 18th district
- In office January 1, 2013 – January 1, 2019
- Preceded by: Doug Berger (Redistricting)
- Succeeded by: John Alexander

Personal details
- Born: John Chadwick Barefoot; May 10, 1983 (age 43) Thomasville, North Carolina, U.S.
- Party: Republican
- Education: Southeastern Baptist Theological Seminary, Appalachian State University
- Profession: Vice President of Institutional Advancement, Louisburg College
- Website: ChadBarefoot.com

John Chadwick "Chad" Barefoot (born May 10, 1983) is a Republican former member of the North Carolina Senate, representing North Carolina's 18th Senate district from 2013 to 2018. Senate District 18 covers Franklin County and parts of eastern and southern Wake County.

A native of Thomasville, he won his first election in 2012 and was reelected in 2014 and 2016. He did not run for reelection in 2018. During his time in office, Barefoot served as Chairman of the Senate Appropriations Subcommittee on Education/Higher Education and the Senate Education/Higher Education Committee. Barefoot also served on the Appropriations/Base Budget, Finance, and Rules and Operations of the Senate Committees.

Chad holds a Master of Arts in Christian Ethics from Southeastern Baptist Theological Seminary in Wake Forest, and a Bachelor of Science with a concentration in public management from Appalachian State University.

== Election results ==
In his first run for elective office, Barefoot won a three-way Republican primary race over Rep. Glen Bradley and Michael Shriver in May 2012.

He faced incumbent Sen. Doug Berger in the general election in November 2012, and won with approximately 56 percent of the vote.

North Carolina Senate District 18, November 6, 2012
Party	Candidate	Votes	%
Republican	Chad Barefoot	51,873	55.92
Democratic	Doug Berger (incumbent)	40,897	44.08
Total votes		92,770	100%
Republican gain from Democratic			

In 2014, Barefoot faced Democrat Sarah Crawford in the general election. Barefoot won with approximately 53 percent of the vote.

North Carolina Senate District 18, November 4, 2014
Party	Candidate	Votes	%
Republican	Chad Barefoot (incumbent)	34,646	52.89
Democratic	Sarah Crawford	30,861	47.11
Total votes		65,507	100%
Republican hold			

In 2016, Barefoot faced Democrat Gil Johnson in the general election. Barefoot won with approximately 55 percent of the vote.

North Carolina Senate District 18, November 8, 2016
Party	Candidate	Votes	%
Republican	Chad Barefoot (incumbent)	57,121	55.34
Democratic	Gil Johnson	46,105	44.66
Total votes		103,226	100%
Republican hold			

Barefoot did not face a primary opponent in the 2014 or 2016 elections.

== Legislative initiatives ==
Student Data Privacy

In his first term, Barefoot successfully passed into law one of the most comprehensive student data privacy bills in the country. Senate Bill 815 requires the North Carolina State Board of Education to make publicly available information regarding the student data system and create safeguards to ensure the privacy and security of personally identifiable data in the student data system. The law restricts the collection of biometric information, political affiliation, religion, and voting history from being collected into the student data system.

In the 2015-16 session, Barefoot passed into law the Student Online Protection Act, which creates a new statute governing student data privacy requirements for operators of third-party online educational applications for K-12 students. The law specifically prohibits renting and selling student data, building student profiles for non-educational reasons, and engaging in targeted advertising using student data. The Student Online Protection Act also directs third-party operators to implement and maintain security procedures to protect covered information, and prohibits operators from using personally identifiable information for any purpose other than the administration of school activities.

Apprenticeships

During the 2015 legislative session, Barefoot successfully repealed the fee that businesses were required to pay to participate in the apprenticeship program. In the 2016 session, Barefoot successfully included a provision in the budget that waives tuition and registration fees at North Carolina Community Colleges for students participating in registered apprenticeship programs, allowing these students to earn a credential or Associate Degree in their field. Additionally, state funding for the apprenticeship program has increased by more than $500,000 under Barefoot's chairmanship of the Senate's Education Appropriations Committee.

Students Know Before You Go

Barefoot introduced a bill entitled, "Students Know Before You Go" to the 2015 legislative session. Senate Bill 536 directs the State Education Assistance Authority to provide information to students and parents on the cost of college degree programs, the likelihood of employment and the average salary associated with those degrees. The bill also directs the NCSEAA to provide students and parents with information on projected employment needs of the state, college majors that may fulfill those needs and the associated salary ranges for those areas of employment. Senate Bill 536 was signed into law in 2016.

Career and College Ready Graduates

Section 10.13 of the 2015 budget entitled, "Career and College Ready Graduates" and introduced by Barefoot, directs the State Board of Community Colleges, in consultation with the State Board of Education, to develop a program that introduces college developmental mathematics and developmental reading and English courses into high school curriculums during the senior year. The policy requires students who do not meet certain ACT score and GPA requirements to take college developmental mathematics, reading and English courses during their senior year of high school. The courses will allow students to fulfill senior mathematics and English graduation requirements. Students who successfully complete the course will not be required to also enroll in developmental courses at a North Carolina community college upon entry.

NCWorks Career Coaches Program

In 2015, Barefoot successfully passed into law a policy that creates the NCWorks Career Coaches Program. This program is designed to place academic and career advisers from community colleges into public high schools throughout North Carolina. The program is aimed at increasing enrollment in the state's workforce pipeline, which includes community colleges, apprenticeships and industry certificate programs.

This program is modeled after Central Carolina Works, a program created in 2014 that placed career and college advisors from Central Carolina Community College in every high school in Chatham, Harnett, and Lee counties to encourage participation in dual enrollment courses and give students guidance regarding two and four year degrees that they may pursue using the college credit earned through dual enrollment.

Early Childhood Education Initiative

Senate Bill 740, which was adopted as a part of the 2016-17 budget and introduced by Barefoot, directs the North Carolina Department of Health and Human Services, the North Carolina Department of Public Instruction and any other interested agencies to work together to develop and implement a statewide vision for early childhood education, specifically focusing on the transition from NC Pre-K to kindergarten.

Prior to this new policy, there were no uniform guidelines on how school systems should conduct the transition of students from Pre-K to kindergarten and communications between agencies were not sufficient to alleviate the problems they were experiencing. As a result, the subcommittee on Statewide Early Education and Family Support Programs of the Joint Legislative Oversight Committee on Health and Human Services recommended that the state look at options to strengthen collaboration between agencies.

As a member of the subcommittee, Barefoot's office took the lead on this issue. Barefoot convened a meeting with stakeholders, including the Department of Health and Human Services and the Department of Public Instruction, to develop a policy that would strengthen the level of collaboration between the early childhood education programs and the K-12 system and provide uniformity to the transition process for everyone involved.

The policy Barefoot developed directs the Department of Health and Human Services, the Department of Public Instruction and any other interested agencies to work together to develop and implement a statewide vision for early childhood education. Specifically, it directs the departments to promote the successful transition of children receiving assistance from the Child Care Subsidy Assistance program from NC Pre-K to kindergarten by recommending that preschool teachers prepare a preschool to kindergarten transition plan for each child that documents the child’s strength and needs. The departments are also directed to develop and implement a standardized program to transition all children from preschool to kindergarten using individualized transition plans.

Wood Burning Stoves

In 2015, after the United States Environmental Protection Agency adopted rule changes to the air emission standards for wood-burning stoves, Barefoot led the way for North Carolina to become the eighth state to challenge the EPA's implementation of these changes. Section 4.3 of House Bill 765 allows North Carolina to exercise its right to opt out of enforcing the EPA's rules by prohibiting the state Environmental Management Commission and Department of Environment and Natural Resources (now the Department of Environmental Quality) from implementing or enforcing these regulations against citizens who use wood-burning stoves to heat their residence or business.

Education Appropriations and Teacher Pay

When Barefoot was first elected to the Senate, total education spending was set at $11.54 billion and it took teachers 33 years to reach a salary of $50,000. Since Barefoot has been in the Senate, total education funding has increased by $1.16 billion, the starting salary of teachers is now $35,000, and teachers can earn a salary of $50,000 in 15 years. Average teacher salaries have increased by more than 15% since Barefoot's first term.

School Choice

In July 2013, Barefoot was instrumental in the North Carolina General Assembly passing the North Carolina Opportunity Scholarship Act to give students from low-income households the chance to attend private schools through scholarships of up to $4,200 per year. This policy was upheld by the North Carolina Supreme Court in 2015.

In 2016, Barefoot established a $34.8 million opportunity scholarship grant fund reserve and provided forward funding of the program to ensure an additional 20,000 students could be served over the next 10 years.

Tax Reform

The North Carolina General Assembly has enacted sweeping tax reforms during Barefoot's time in the Senate. The personal income tax rate has dropped from 7.75% in 2013 to 5.49% in 2017, the corporate income tax rate has dropped from 6.9% in 2013 to 3% in 2017, and the sales tax rate was lowered and capped at 4.75%. The legislature also increased the standard tax deduction for taxpayers filing as Married Filing Jointly from $6,000 to $17,500 in 2018. These reforms put North Carolina's tax rates among the lowest in the region and generated $22.2 billion in tax revenue over the 2015-16 fiscal year.

Rainy Day Fund and Debt Payment

The North Carolina General Assembly has made significant investments in debt payment and savings reserves during Barefoot's time in the Senate. In 2016, the state's rainy day fund was set at just under $1.6 billion, the most in North Carolina's history.

In 2015, the General Assembly paid off the state's $2.75 billion debt to the federal government for first-time unemployment claims. In 2016, the General Assembly paid off a $37 million loan that Governor Jim Hunt borrowed in 1999, saving the state $45 million in interest payments over the next 30 years.

== Honors ==
In 2018, Barefoot was listed as a Champion of the Family in the NC Values Coalition Scorecard.

North Carolina Senate
Preceded by Bob Atwater	Member of the North Carolina Senate from the 18th district 2013–2019	Succeeded by John Alexander
