= Chris Malone (politician) =

American politician from North Carolina

Member of the North Carolina House of Representatives from the 35th district
- In office January 1, 2013 – January 1, 2019
- Preceded by: Constituency established
- Succeeded by: Terence Everitt

Personal details
- Born: June 10, 1957 (age 69)
- Party: Republican

Chris Malone (born June 10, 1957) a former North Carolina State Representative, was the Deputy Majority Whip for the 2017-2018 Session. He is a Republican, once representing District 35. He was defeated in his bid for a 4th term on November 6, 2018, by Democrat Terence Everitt.

== Wake County School Board ==
Malone was elected to the Wake County School Board from 2009 to his election to the North Carolina House of Representatives in 2012.

During his tenure on the school board, Malone voted to raise the salaries of school board members, including himself.

== NC House of Representatives ==
Committee Assignments, 2017-2018 Session

Standing or Select Committee Status Alcoholic Beverage Control Member Appropriations Vice-chairman Appropriations, Health and Human Services Chairman Energy and Public Utilities Member Health Member House Select Committee on Redistricting Member House Select Committee on School Safety Member Insurance Member Wildlife Resources Chairman

Non-Standing Committee Status Joint Legislative Education Oversight Committee Advisory Member Joint Legislative Oversight Committee on Health and Human Services Member Committee on Intellectual and Developmental Disabilities (LRC)(2017) Member Joint Legislative Oversight Committee on Medicaid and NC Health Choice Advisory Member

North Carolina House of Representatives
Preceded by Jennifer Weiss	Member of the North Carolina House of Representatives from the 35th district 2013–2019	Succeeded by Terence Everitt
