= Cynthia Ball =

American politician from North Carolina

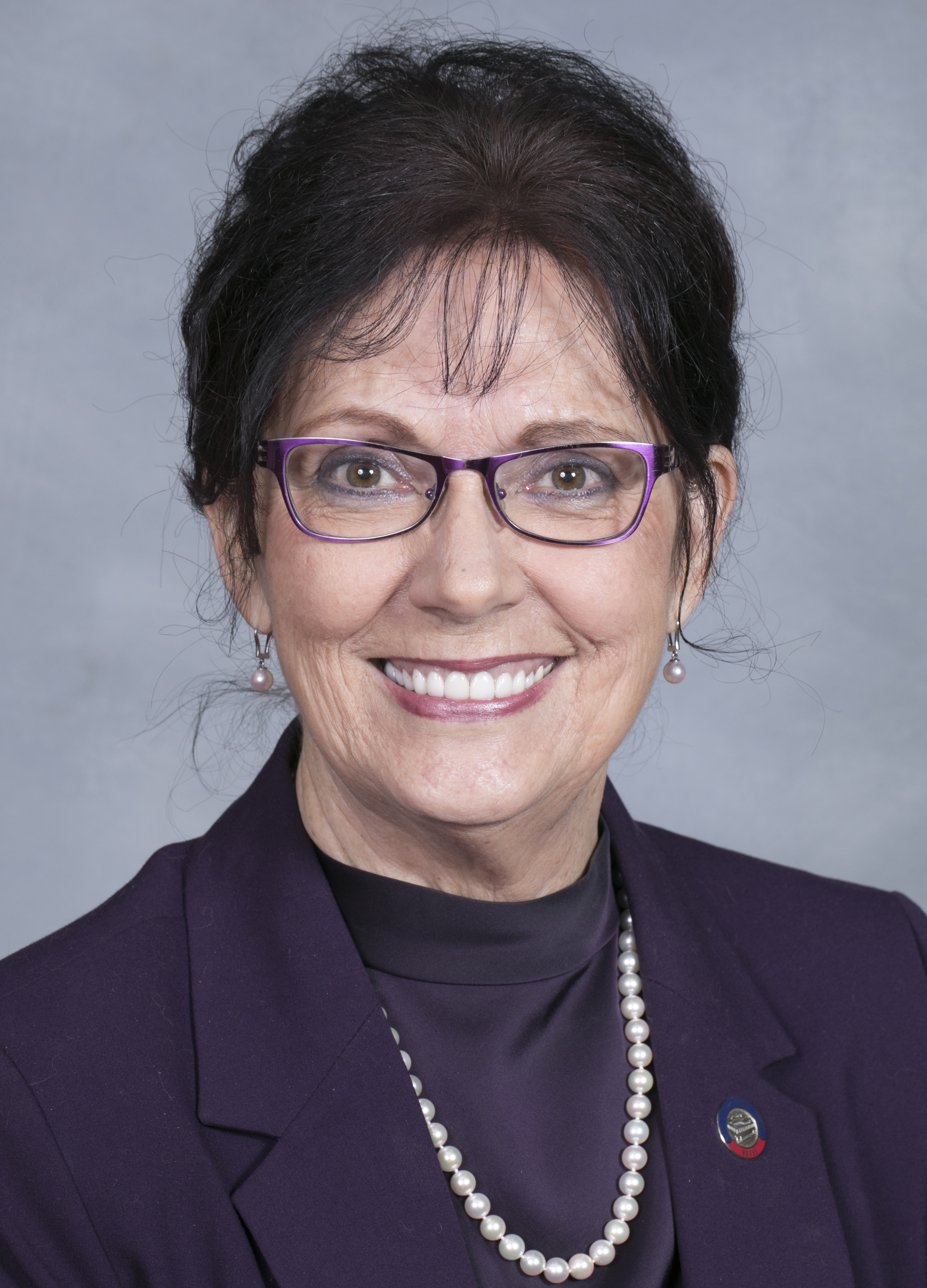

Deputy Minority Leader of the North Carolina House of Representatives
- Incumbent
- Assumed office August 5, 2024
- Leader: Robert Reives
- Preceded by: Ashton Clemmons

Member of the North Carolina House of Representatives from the 49th district
- Incumbent
- Assumed office January 1, 2017
- Preceded by: Gary Pendleton

Personal details
- Born: Franklin County, North Carolina, U.S.
- Party: Democratic
- Spouse: David Aspnes
- Education: University of North Carolina, Greensboro (BA); Virginia Commonwealth University (MBA)
- Occupation: Mediator
- Website: Official website

Cynthia J. Ball is an American politician and member of the North Carolina House of Representatives. A Democrat, she was first elected in 2016 and then re-elected in 2018, 2020, 2022, and 2024 to represent the 49th district, representing Wake County.

Ball voted for the 2025 Republican budget.

== Life and career ==
Ball was born in Franklin County, North Carolina. She earned a BA in psychology from the University of North Carolina at Greensboro and an MBA at Virginia Commonwealth University. She works as a professional mediator. She lives in Raleigh, North Carolina, and is married to David Aspnes, a physics professor at North Carolina State University.

== Committee assignments ==
=== 2023–2024 session ===
- Appropriations
- Appropriations - Health and Human Services
- Education - K-12
- Election Law and Campaign Finance Reform
- Health
- Local Government - Land Use, Planning and Development

=== 2021–2022 session ===
- Appropriations
- Appropriations - Education
- Education - K-12
- Election Law and Campaign Finance Reform
- Health
- Local Government - Land Use, Planning and Development

=== 2019–2020 session ===
- Appropriations
- Appropriations - Education
- Education - K-12
- Election Law and Campaign Finance Reform
- Health
- Commerce

=== 2017–2018 session ===
- Appropriations
- Appropriations - Education
- Health
- Insurance
- State and Local Government II
- State Personnel

== Electoral history ==
=== 2024 ===
North Carolina House of Representatives 49th district general election, 2024
Party	Candidate	Votes	%
Democratic	Cynthia Ball (incumbent)	32,814	100%
Total votes		32,814	100%
Democratic hold			

=== 2022 ===
North Carolina House of Representatives 49th district general election, 2022
Party	Candidate	Votes	%
Democratic	Cynthia Ball (incumbent)	22,519	67.77%
Republican	David Robertson	9,764	29.38%
Libertarian	Michael Oakes	946	2.85%
Total votes		33,229	100%
Democratic hold			

=== 2020 ===
North Carolina House of Representatives 49th district general election, 2020
Party	Candidate	Votes	%
Democratic	Cynthia Ball (incumbent)	37,807	65.05%
Republican	David Robertson	17,564	30.22%
Libertarian	Dee Watson	2,752	4.73%
Total votes		58,123	100%
Democratic hold			

=== 2018 ===
North Carolina House of Representatives 49th district general election, 2018
Party	Candidate	Votes	%
Democratic	Cynthia Ball (incumbent)	27,538	66.27%
Republican	David Robertson	12,929	31.11%
Libertarian	Jonathan Horst	1,086	2.61%
Total votes		41,553	100%
Democratic hold			

=== 2016 ===
North Carolina House of Representatives 49th district general election, 2016
Party	Candidate	Votes	%
Democratic	Cynthia Ball	26,975	48.67%
Republican	Gary Pendleton (incumbent)	26,155	47.19%
Libertarian	David Ulmer	2,299	4.15%
Total votes		55,429	100%
Democratic gain from Republican			

North Carolina House of Representatives
Preceded by Gary Pendleton	Member of the North Carolina House of Representatives from the 49th district 2017–Present	Incumbent
Preceded by Ashton Clemmons	Deputy Minority Leader of the North Carolina House of Representatives; 2024–Present	Incumbent
