= Angel Capital Association =

Alliance of angel investor groups in the United States

Angel Capital Association (ACA) is the official industry alliance of over 100 of the largest angel investor groups in the United States. Since its founding in 2004, it has played a significant role in bringing together the previously separate angel and venture capital industries, in order to make networking, practices, and innovation in the field of investment easier.

ACA, which grew out of four Angel Organization Summits convened by the Ewing Marion Kauffman Foundation in 2002 and 2003, sponsors an annual summit meeting in a different city each year at which the leaders of the major organized angel groups, together with government leaders, academics and venture capitalists, share best practices and build new ideas based on this knowledge. ACA has become the nationally recognized voice of the angel investment community in the US, mirroring the role that the National Venture Capital Association plays for the venture community. ACA is the official US representative member of the World Business Angels Association.

Since ACA was formed with a charitable purpose of education and research in the field of angel investment, chairmembers and leaders of ACA are frequently involved in educational programs such as the Power of Angel Investing Seminars produced by ACA's affiliated foundation, the Angel Capital Education Foundation. While individual angel investors and angel group leaders participate in ACA events, membership in the organization itself is only for organized groups of angel investors that meet ACA's requirements, and not for individual investors. ACA's website lists angel groups across the nation which bring together investors in local regions or specific industries.

The founding chairman of ACA was James Geshwiler of Common Angels in Boston, who was succeeded by John May of the New Vantage Group in Washington DC. The current chairman of the organization is Tony Shipley of Queen City Angels of Cincinnati.
