= Jim Fulghum =

American politician from North Carolina

Representative Jim Fulghum

Member of the North Carolina House of Representatives from the 49th district
- In office January 1, 2013 – July 19, 2014
- Preceded by: Constituency established
- Succeeded by: Gary Pendleton

Personal details
- Born: James Spencer Fulghum III; April 29, 1944 Raleigh, North Carolina, U.S.
- Died: July 19, 2014 (aged 70) Raleigh, North Carolina, U.S.
- Party: Republican
- Education: North Carolina State University; University of North Carolina School of Medicine
- Occupation: Physician

James Spencer Fulghum III (April 29, 1944 – July 19, 2014) was an American physician and politician.

Born in Raleigh, North Carolina, Fulghum attended Needham B. Broughton High School, received his bachelor's degree in zoology from North Carolina State University, and his medical degree from the University of North Carolina School of Medicine. He served in the United States Army from 1971 to 1990 and then practiced medicine in Raleigh, North Carolina. He served in the North Carolina House of Representatives as a Republican from 2013 until his death. He died of cancer in Raleigh, North Carolina.

== Electoral history ==
North Carolina House of Representatives 49th district Republican primary election, 2012
Party	Candidate	Votes	%
Republican	Jim Fulghum	8,300	65.86%
Republican	Russell Capps	4,303	34.14%
Total votes		12,603	100%

North Carolina House of Representatives 49th district general election, 2012
Party	Candidate	Votes	%
Republican	Jim Fulghum	28,300	53.97%
Democratic	Keith Karlsson	24,134	46.03%
Total votes		52,434	100%
Republican win (new seat)			

North Carolina House of Representatives
Preceded by Glen Bradley	Member of the North Carolina House of Representatives from the 49th district 2013-2014	Succeeded by Gary Pendleton
