= Mary Wills Bode =

American politician

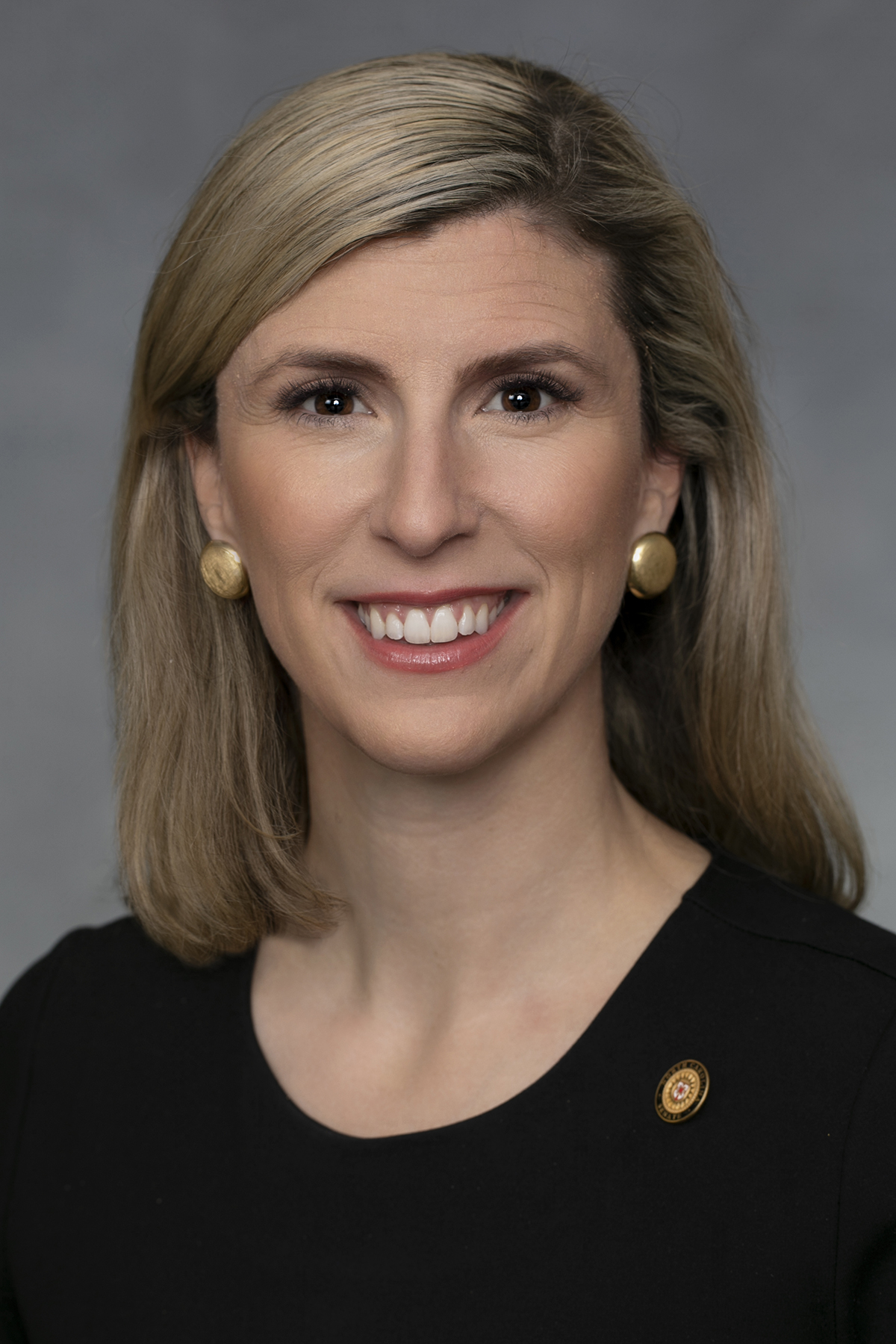

Member of the North Carolina Senate from the 18th district
- In office January 1, 2023 – November 21, 2024
- Preceded by: Sarah Crawford
- Succeeded by: Terence Everitt

Personal details
- Born: Wake County, North Carolina, U.S.
- Party: Democratic
- Education: Wake Forest University; University of North Carolina at Chapel Hill
- Website: https://www.bode4senate.com/

Mary Wills Bode is an American politician who served as a member of the North Carolina Senate from 2023 to 2024. A Democrat from Oxford, she represented the 18th district.

== Education ==
Bode is a graduate of Wake Forest University and the University of North Carolina at Chapel Hill.

== Career ==
Bode served as a member of the North Carolina Real Estate Commission. She was previously the executive director of a bipartisan coalition for reform of redistricting.

Bode was elected in the 2022 North Carolina Senate election. She retired at the 2024 North Carolina Senate election.

In the 2024 United States presidential election, she endorsed the Kamala Harris 2024 presidential campaign alongside the rest of the senate caucus.

== Family ==
Her father is an Army veteran who graduated from West Point Academy. Her mother Lucy Hancock Bode worked for the Department of Human Resources under Governor Jim Hunt.
