= Gary H. Pendleton =

American politician

Brigadier General (Retired) Gary Pendleton
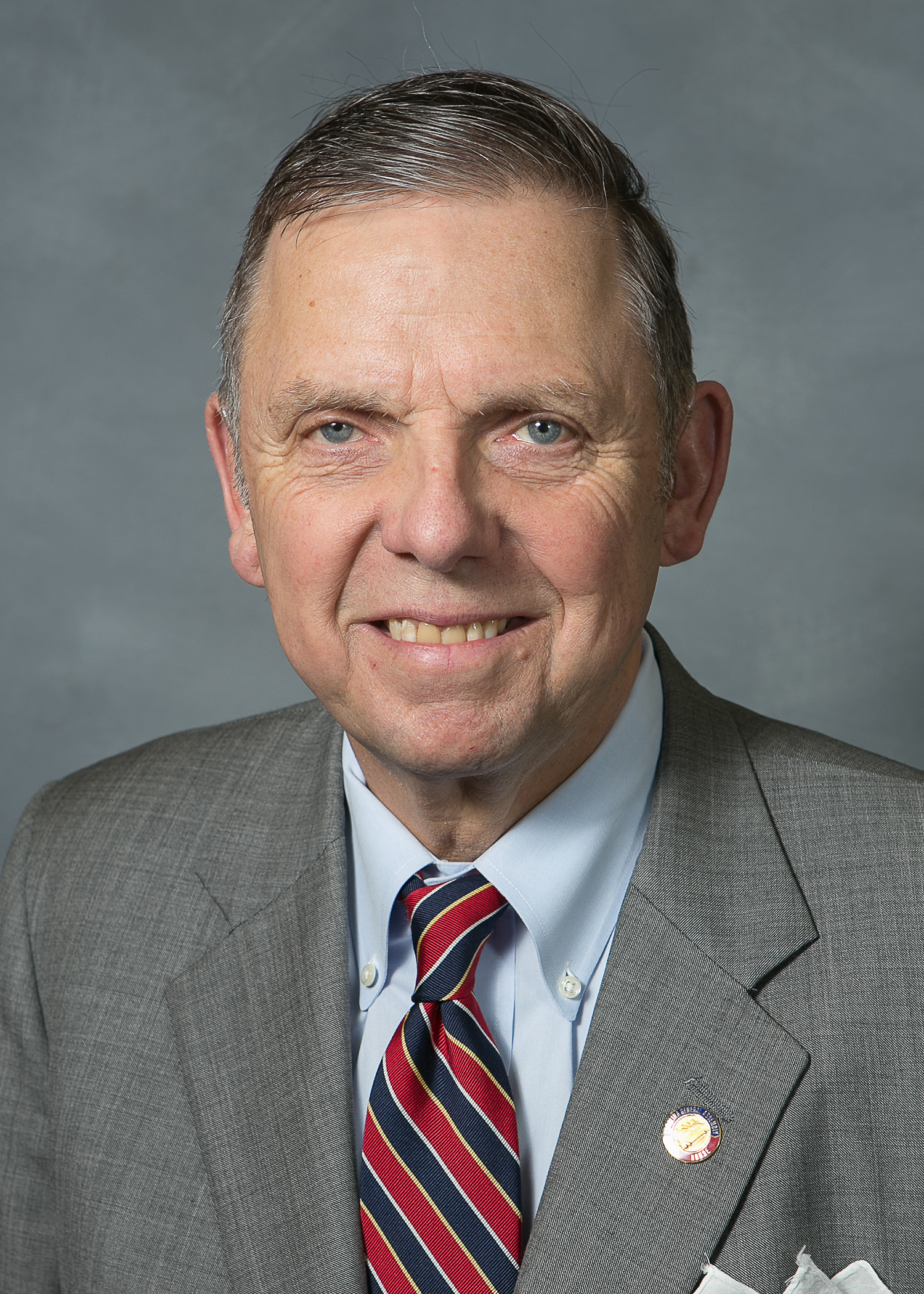

Member of the North Carolina House of Representatives from the 49th district
- In office August 19, 2014 – January 1, 2017
- Preceded by: Jim Fulghum
- Succeeded by: Cynthia Ball

Personal details
- Born: 1947 (age 78–79)
- Party: Republican

Gary H. Pendleton (born 1947) is an American politician who served as a Republican member of the North Carolina General Assembly from 2015 to 2017, representing the 49th district.

In 2020, Pendleton was charged with assault after an altercation with a poll worker during early voting for the presidential election.

== Electoral history ==
=== 2016 ===
North Carolina House of Representatives 49th district general election, 2016
| Party | Candidate | Votes | % |
|---|---|---|---|
| Democratic | Cynthia Ball | 26,975 | 48.67% |
| Republican | Gary Pendleton (incumbent) | 26,155 | 47.19% |
| Libertarian | David Ulmer | 2,299 | 4.15% |
| Total votes | | 55,429 | 100% |
| Democratic gain from Republican | | | |

=== 2014 ===
North Carolina House of Representatives 49th district general election, 2014
| Party | Candidate | Votes | % |
|---|---|---|---|
| Republican | Gary Pendleton (incumbent) | 20,588 | 51.63% |
| Democratic | Kim Hanchette | 19,290 | 48.37% |
| Total votes | | 39,878 | 100% |
| Republican hold | | | |

North Carolina House of Representatives
| Preceded by Jim Fulghum | Member of the North Carolina House of Representatives from the 49th district 2014-2017 | Succeeded by Cynthia Ball |
