= Haseeb Fatmi =

American politician from North Carolina

Member of the North Carolina Senate from the 18th district
- Incumbent
- Assumed office May 21, 2026
- Preceded by: Terence Everitt

Personal details
- Born: North Carolina, U.S.
- Party: Democratic
- Education: University of North Carolina at Chapel Hill (BA); Fordham University School of Law (JD)
- Website: Legislature page

Haseeb S. Fatmi is an American attorney and politician serving as a member of the North Carolina Senate representing the 18th district since May 2026. He was appointed to the role to succeed Terence Everitt, who resigned to focus on his role at the Voters Protection Project. Fatmi was previously a Wake Forest commissioner.

== Early life and career ==
Fatmi was born and raised in North Carolina and graduated from William G. Enloe High School. He then earned a Bachelor of Arts from the University of North Carolina at Chapel Hill in 2009 and a Juris Doctor from Fordham University School of Law in 2012. Fatmi currently works as an of counsel at Ogletree Deakins in Raleigh, North Carolina.

In November 2025, Fatmi was elected to the Wake Forest Board of Commissioners.

== North Carolina Senate ==
In May 2026, Fatmi was appointed to the 18th district of the North Carolina Senate to succeed Terence Everitt, who resigned to focus on his role at the Voters Protection Project.

== Personal life ==
Fatmi is Muslim.

== Electoral history ==
=== 2025 ===
Wake Forest Board of Commissioners general election, 2025
Party	Candidate	Votes	%
Nonpartisan	Haseeb Fatmi	5,748	27.56%
Nonpartisan	R. Keith Shackleford (incumbent)	5,426	26.02%
Nonpartisan	Thomas Dement	3,819	18.31%
Nonpartisan	Pam James	3,533	16.94%
Nonpartisan	Nick Sliwinski (incumbent)	1,195	5.73%
Nonpartisan	Jasmine Zavala	1,115	5.35%
Write-in		17	0.08%
Total votes		20,853	100%

North Carolina Senate
Preceded by Terence Everitt	Member of the North Carolina Senate from the 18th district 2026–Present	Incumbent
