= Terence Everitt =

American politician (born 1974)

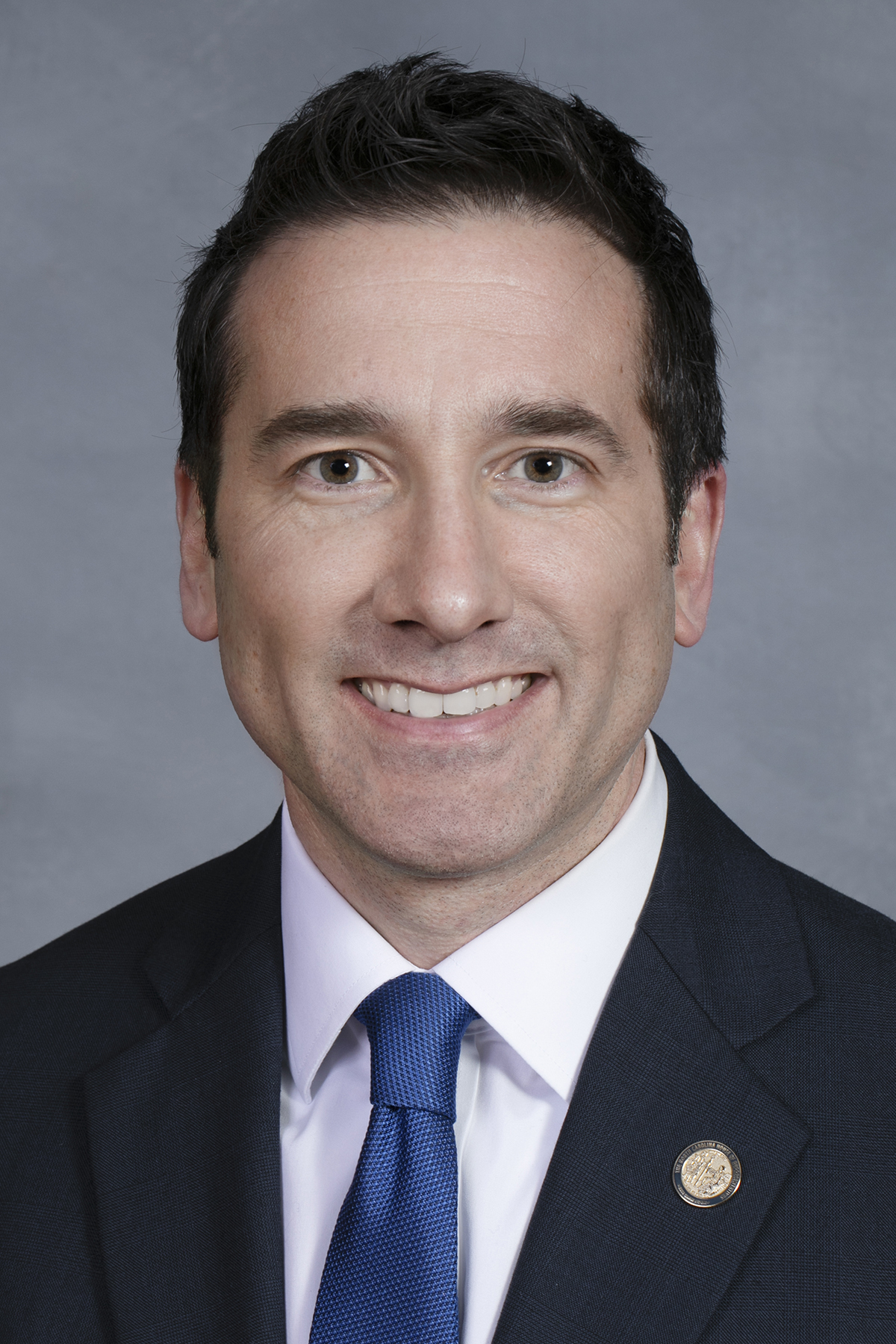

Member of the North Carolina Senate from the 18th district
- In office January 1, 2025 – May 1, 2026
- Preceded by: Mary Wills Bode
- Succeeded by: Haseeb Fatmi

Member of the North Carolina House of Representatives from the 35th district
- In office January 1, 2019 – January 1, 2025
- Preceded by: Chris Malone
- Succeeded by: Mike Schietzelt

Personal details
- Born: Terence Jason Everitt; June 5, 1974 (age 52)
- Party: Democratic
- Spouse: Jennifer
- Children: 2
- Education: Rutgers University (BA); Columbus School of Law (JD)
- Occupation: Attorney
- Website: Official website

Terence Jason Everitt (born June 5, 1974) is a former Democratic member of the North Carolina Senate from the 18th district (including constituents in Granville and northern Wake counties), serving from 2025 to 2026. He previously served as a member of the North Carolina House of Representatives from the 35th district (including constituents in northern Wake County) from 2019 to 2025.

== Career ==
Everitt unsuccessfully challenged Republican Chris Malone in the November 2016 election. In 2018 Everitt sought a rematch with Malone and won by a margin of 51 percent to 46 percent. In 2020, Everitt was re-elected by a margin of 50 to 45 percent over Republican challenger Fred Von Canon.

In September 2023, after Everitt called for an investigation into the Speaker of the North Carolina House of Representatives, Republican Tim Moore, on allegations of embezzlement, Moore moved Everitt's office to the basement of the North Carolina State Legislative Building. In a letter, Moore stated that it was "historic" and for his safety, while Everitt claimed it was retaliation.

In November 2026, after Moore lost his re-election bid to his Democrat opponent, Everitt posted an open letter to Moore on social media, echoing the language of Moore's 2023 letter, saying that voters had "decided to relocate your office," and "Losing a district you helped draw for yourself is quite an accomplishment."

Everitt was elected to the North Carolina Senate in 2024 and served until May 2026, when he resigned in order to work full time with the North Carolina Voter Protection Alliance.

== Electoral history ==
=== 2024 ===
North Carolina Senate 18th district general election, 2024
Party	Candidate	Votes	%
Democratic	Terence Everitt	59,667	48.47%
Republican	Ashlee Bryan Adams	59,539	48.36%
Libertarian	Brad Hessel	3,906	3.17%
Total votes		123,112	100%
Democratic hold			

=== 2022 ===
North Carolina House of Representatives 35th district general election, 2022
Party	Candidate	Votes	%
Democratic	Terence Everitt (incumbent)	19,313	51.99%
Republican	Fred Von Canon	17,106	46.05%
Libertarian	Joseph Serio	728	1.96%
Total votes		37,147	100%
Democratic hold			

=== 2020 ===
North Carolina House of Representatives 35th district general election, 2020
Party	Candidate	Votes	%
Democratic	Terence Everitt (incumbent)	31,630	50.67%
Republican	Fred Von Canon	28,528	45.70%
Libertarian	Michael Nelson	2,262	3.63%
Total votes		62,420	100%
Democratic hold			

=== 2018 ===
North Carolina House of Representatives 35th district Democratic primary election, 2018
Party	Candidate	Votes	%
Democratic	Terence Everitt	3,926	81.67%
Democratic	Adam B. Wright	881	18.33%
Total votes		4,807	100%

North Carolina House of Representatives 35th district general election, 2018
Party	Candidate	Votes	%
Democratic	Terence Everitt	23,187	51.09%
Republican	Chris Malone (incumbent)	20,668	45.54%
Libertarian	Michael Nelson	1,532	3.38%
Total votes		45,387	100%
Democratic gain from Republican			

=== 2016 ===
North Carolina House of Representatives 35th district general election, 2016
Party	Candidate	Votes	%
Republican	Chris Malone (incumbent)	25,117	53.14%
Democratic	Terence Everitt	22,145	46.86%
Total votes		47,262	100%
Republican hold			

== Committee assignments ==
=== 2021–2022 Session ===
- Agriculture
- Banking
- Commerce
- Finance
- Judiciary IV

=== 2019–2020 Session ===
- Banking
- Commerce
- Finance
- Judiciary

North Carolina House of Representatives
Preceded by Chris Malone	Member of the North Carolina House of Representatives from the 35th district 2019–2025	Succeeded by Mike Schietzelt
North Carolina Senate
Preceded by Mary Wills Bode	Member of the North Carolina Senate from the 18th district 2025–2026	Succeeded by Haseeb Fatmi
