= Sarah Crawford (politician) =

American politician

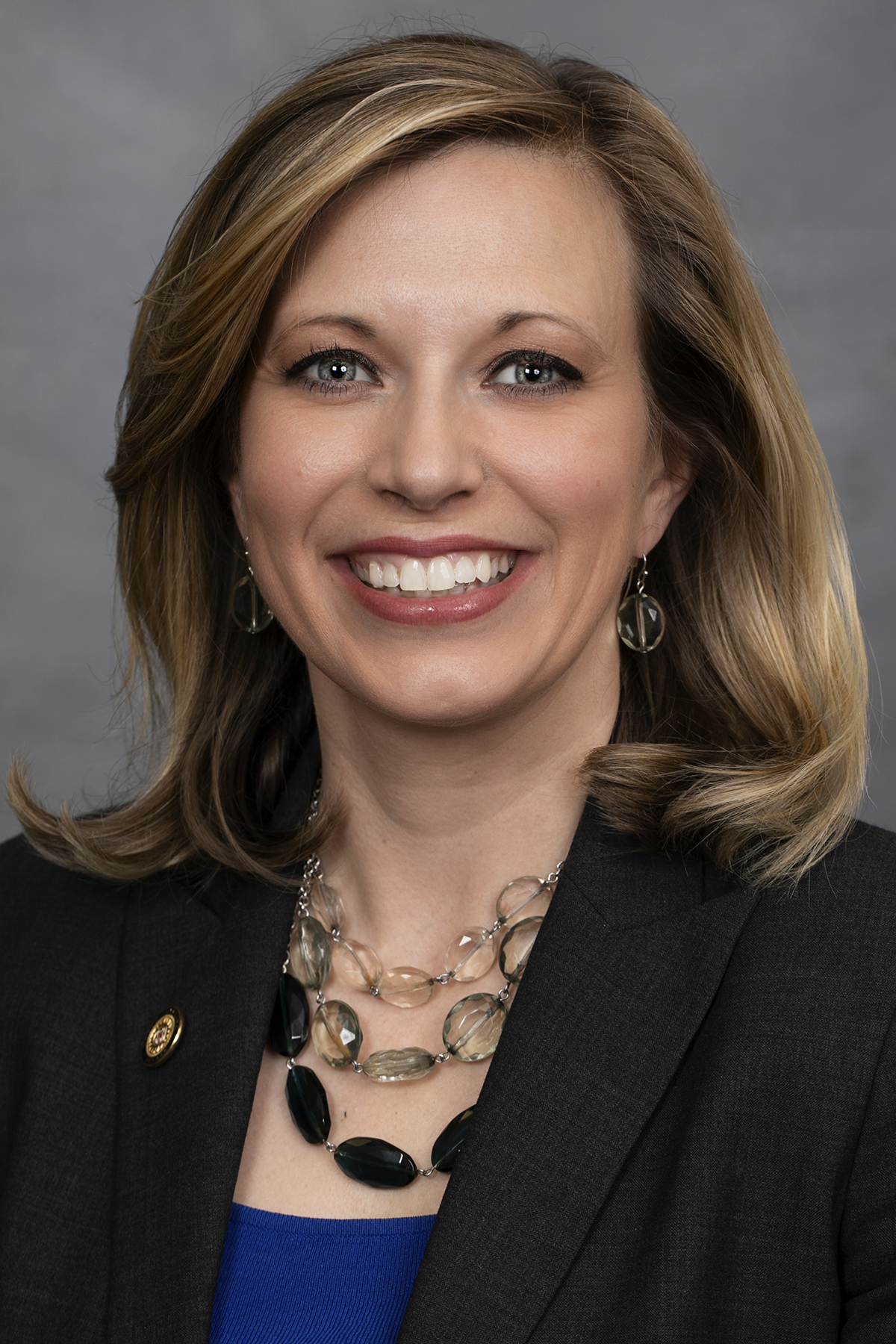

Member of the North Carolina House of Representatives from the 66th district
- Incumbent
- Assumed office January 1, 2023
- Preceded by: Constituency established

Member of the North Carolina Senate from the 18th district
- In office January 1, 2021 – January 1, 2023
- Preceded by: John Alexander
- Succeeded by: Mary Wills Bode

Personal details
- Born: 1980 or 1981 (age 44–45)
- Party: Democratic
- Children: 2
- Education: North Carolina State University (BA)
- Website: Campaign website

Sarah Randall Crawford (born 1980/1981) is an American politician and nonprofit executive. She has served as a member of the North Carolina House of Representatives, having represented the 66th district (including constituents in Wake County) since 2023. She previously served in the North Carolina Senate from 2021 to 2023, representing the 18th district (which includes parts of Franklin and Wake counties).

From 2011 to 2015, Crawford worked as Director of Development and Public Relations for the Tammy Lynn Center, a nonprofit organization serving people with intellectual and developmental disabilities. She then served as national director for Single Stop, a national nonprofit that helps individuals achieve economic prosperity by connecting them to benefits and resources, before returning to the Tammy Lynn Center as its chief executive officer in 2020.

== Electoral history ==
=== 2022 ===
North Carolina House of Representatives 66th district Democratic primary election, 2022
Party	Candidate	Votes	%
Democratic	Sarah Crawford	3,121	47.24%
Democratic	Wesley Knott	2,982	45.13%
Democratic	Frank "Jeremiah" Pierce	504	7.63%
Total votes		6,607	100%

North Carolina House of Representatives 66th district general election, 2022
Party	Candidate	Votes	%
Democratic	Sarah Crawford	18,606	70.13%
Republican	Ives Brizuela de Sholar	7,220	27.21%
Libertarian	Micao Penaflor	705	2.66%
Total votes		26,531	100%
Democratic win (new seat)			

=== 2020 ===
North Carolina Senate 18th district general election, 2020
Party	Candidate	Votes	%
Democratic	Sarah Crawford	67,912	52.08%
Republican	Larry E. Norman	57,890	44.40%
Libertarian	Jason Loeback	4,595	3.52%
Total votes		130,397	100%
Democratic gain from Republican			

=== 2014 ===
North Carolina Senate 18th district general election, 2014
Party	Candidate	Votes	%
Republican	Chad Barefoot (incumbent)	34,646	52.89%
Democratic	Sarah Crawford	30,861	47.11%
Total votes		65,507	100%
Republican hold			
