= Mike Schietzelt =

American politician (born 1986)

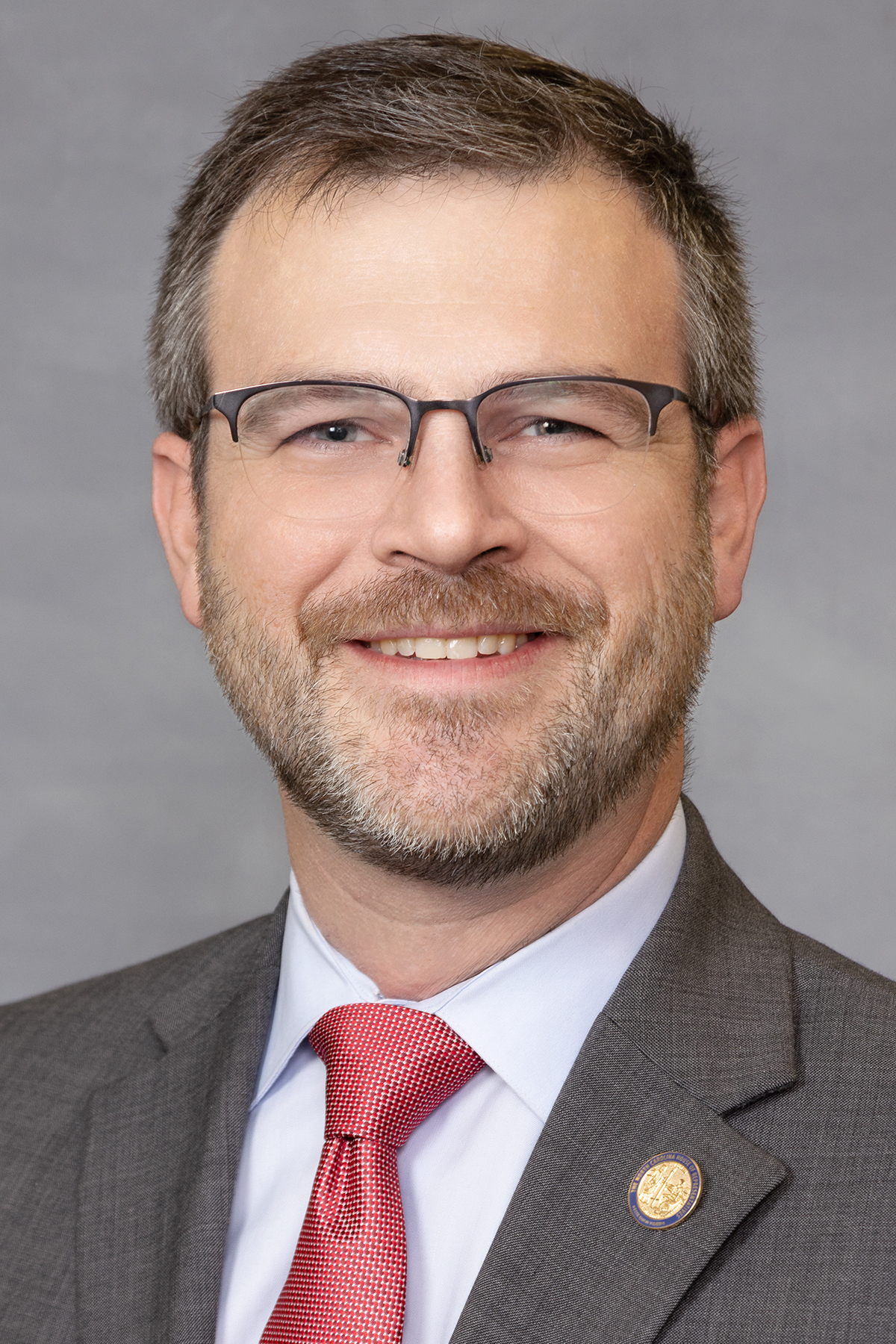

Member of the North Carolina House of Representatives from the 35th district
- Incumbent
- Assumed office January 1, 2025
- Preceded by: Terence Everitt

Personal details
- Born: October 24, 1986 (age 40) Escondido, California, U.S.
- Party: Republican
- Spouse: Carmon
- Children: 4
- Education: University of North Carolina at Greensboro (BM); Duke University (JD)

Military service
- Branch/service: United States Marine Corps
- Years of service: 2011–2015
- Rank: Sergeant
- Unit: United States Marine Drum and Bugle Corps

Michael Gary Schietzelt, Jr. (born October 24, 1986) is an American attorney and Republican politician representing the North Carolina's 35th House district since 2025. A former United States Marine and Duke Law School graduate, Schietzelt was first elected in the 2024 general election and assumed office on January 1, 2025.

== Early life, education, and career ==
Schietzelt was born on October 24, 1986 in Escondido, California. He was raised in Burlington, North Carolina by his father, Michael, Sr., a United States Marine and a Vietnam War veteran. Schietzelt graduated from Western Alamance High School in 2004 and earned a bachelor's degree from the University of North Carolina at Greensboro, majoring in Music Performance as a trumpet player. Schietzelt performed at amusement parks and on cruise ships before enlisting in the United States Marine Corps in 2011 as a member of "The Commandant's Own" United States Marine Drum and Bugle Corps. In the Marine Corps, Schietzelt performed for many top-ranking officials in the United States government and sounded taps for military funerals at Arlington National Cemetery.

After completing active service, Schietzelt attended Duke University School of Law in Durham, North Carolina and earned a Juris Doctor degree in 2018. Upon graduation, he served as a law clerk to Chief Justice Mark D. Martin of the North Carolina Supreme Court.

Schietzelt worked as a Criminal Justice Fellow with the John Locke Foundation in Raleigh, North Carolina from 2019 to 2020, researching and publishing on issues related to the criminal code. He argued for structural reforms to the criminal law that would ease burdens on law enforcement and the court system, "protect[ ] the rule of law and boost[ ] public trust and confidence in our criminal justice system."

In March 2020, Schietzelt became the founding Constitutional Law Fellow of Regent University School of Law's Robertson Center for Constitutional Law. Schietzelt represented members of Congress, campus ministries, and other faith-based organizations in the Supreme Court of the United States and United States Circuit Courts of Appeals as amici curiae in cases implicating the First Amendment and separation of powers. A Lecturer at Regent, Schietzelt taught courses on the First Amendment and Religious Liberty. He also published scholarly articles on constitutional issues, most notably the Free Exercise Clause.

In July 2022, Schietzelt joined the law firm Michael Best and Friedrich, LLP as a member of the litigation practice group.

== Political experience ==
Schietzelt announced his campaign for the 35th District of the North Carolina House of Representatives in December 2023. He won the Republican Party primary election on March 5, 2024, and he won the general election on November 5, 2024. He was sworn in as a member of the House of Representatives in January 2025 by the judge for whom he clerked, retired Chief Justice Mark Martin, now dean of the Kenneth F. Kahn School of Law at High Point University.

In May 2025, Schietzelt introduced an amendment to the House budget prohibiting the use of state funds to convert the section of U.S. 1/Capital Boulevard between Raleigh and Wake Forest into a toll road. He argued that tolling the highway would impose an unfair cost on working- and middle-class commuters in his district and that a roadway free to the public for over a century should remain so. The House adopted the amendment by a bipartisan 71–37 vote, reflecting broad legislative resistance to the tolling proposal, although the measure still required Senate concurrence and inclusion in the final budget to take effect.

== Election results ==
=== 2024 ===
North Carolina House of Representatives 35th district general election, 2024
Party	Candidate	Votes	%
Republican	Mike Schietzelt	28,651	50.27%
Democratic	Evonne Hopkins	26,831	47.08%
Libertarian	Michael Oakes	1,513	2.65%
Total votes		56,995	100%
Republican gain from Democratic			

North Carolina House of Representatives 35th district Republican primary election, 2024
Party	Candidate	Votes	%
Republican	Mike Schietzelt	6,366	64.82%
Republican	James Norman	3,455	35.18%
Total votes		9,821	100%
