= John May (North Carolina politician) =

American politician from North Carolina (1950–2017)

Member of the Franklin County Board of Commissioners from the 3rd district
- In office December 3, 2012 – May 31, 2017
- Preceded by: Robert Lee Swanson
- Succeeded by: Mark Speed

Member of the North Carolina House of Representatives from the 49th district
- In office April 21, 2010 – January 1, 2011
- Preceded by: Lucy Allen
- Succeeded by: Glen Bradley

Personal details
- Born: John Milton May; January 21, 1950 Franklin County, North Carolina
- Died: May 31, 2017 (aged 67) Louisburg, North Carolina
- Party: Democratic
- Spouse: Vickie Gay

John Milton May (January 21, 1950 – May 31, 2017) was a Democratic member of the North Carolina House of Representatives. He was appointed by Governor Beverly Perdue to represent District 49 in the House on April 21, 2010, after being selected by local Democrats in the district (which includes all or parts of Franklin, Halifax, and Nash counties). He filled the vacancy left by the resignation of Rep. Lucy Allen. At the time of his appointment to the legislature, May, a retiree, was serving as a member of the Franklin County Board of Education. He was a veteran of the United States Army and was active in the Communication Workers of America.

After joining the House, May was appointed to represent his state on the new Virginia-North Carolina Interstate High-Speed Rail Compact board, and was appointed vice-chairman of the Local Government I committee.

May was defeated for election to a full term in 2010 by Glen Bradley. In 2012, May was elected to the Franklin County Board of Commissioners, an office he held until his death.

== Electoral history ==
=== 2016 ===
Franklin County Board of Commissioners 3rd district general election, 2016
Party	Candidate	Votes	%
Democratic	John May (incumbent)	2,900	56.60%
Independent	Glenn Swanson	2,224	43.40%
Total votes		5,124	100%
Democratic hold			

=== 2012 ===
Franklin County Board of Commissioners 3rd district Democratic primary election, 2012
Party	Candidate	Votes	%
Democratic	John May	1,076	61.63%
Democratic	Joey Mills	389	22.28%
Democratic	Linda A. Maggio	281	16.09%
Total votes		1,746	100%

Franklin County Board of Commissioners 3rd district general election, 2012
Party	Candidate	Votes	%
Democratic	John May	2,797	53.77%
Republican	Jeremy Neal	2,405	46.23%
Total votes		5,202	100%
Democratic hold			

=== 2010 ===
North Carolina House of Representatives 49th district general election, 2010
Party	Candidate	Votes	%
Republican	Glen Bradley	11,276	51.68%
Democratic	John May (incumbent)	10,544	48.32%
Total votes		21,820	100%
Republican gain from Democratic			

North Carolina House of Representatives
Preceded by Lucy Allen	Member of the North Carolina House of Representatives from the 49th district 2010-2011	Succeeded by Glen Bradley
