= John May (Medal of Honor) =

American soldier, recipient of the Medal of Honor (1836–1886)

- Born: 1836; Kingdom of Württemberg
- Died: March 19, 1886 (aged 49–50); La Junta, Colorado, United States
- Burial place: Fairview Cemetery
- Military career
- Allegiance: United States of America
- Branch: United States Army
- Service years: c. 1869–1870
- Rank: Sergeant
- Unit: 6th U.S. Cavalry
- Conflicts: Indian Wars; Texas–Indian Wars
- Awards: Medal of Honor

John May (1836 – March 19, 1886) was an American soldier in the U.S. Army who served with the 6th U.S. Cavalry during the Texas-Indian Wars. He was one of thirteen men who received the Medal of Honor for gallantry against the Kiowa at the Battle of the Little Wichita River on July 12, 1870.

== Biography ==
Born in the Kingdom of Württemberg in 1836, John May emigrated to the United States where he eventually enlisted in the U.S. Army at Philadelphia, Pennsylvania. He became a member of the 6th U.S. Cavalry where he eventually reached the rank of sergeant. Serving on frontier duty in Texas, May would eventually become a veteran Indian fighter during Texas-Indian Wars. While stationed at Fort Richardson in the summer of 1870, he was part of a mixed detachment consisting of 3 officers and 56 men under the command of Captain Curwen B. McClellan which pursued a band of Indians who had captured the mail at Rock Station only 16 miles from the fort. After nearly a week on the trail, they were ambushed by 250 Kiowas led by Chief Kicking Bird resulting in what would become known as the Battle of the Little Wichita River. Vastly outnumbered, May and his fellow soldiers took cover and were eventually able to force the Kiowas to retreat. After returning to Fort Richardson, McClellan recommended May and 12 other men for the Medal of Honor which they received on August 25, 1870. May died in La Junta, Colorado on March 19, 1886, at age 50. He was interred at Fairview Cemetery.

== Medal of Honor citation ==
Rank and organization: Sergeant, Company L, 6th U.S. Cavalry. Place and date: At Wichita River, Tex., 12 July 1870. Entered service at: ------. Birth: Germany. Date of issue: 25 August 1870.

Citation:

Gallantry in action.

== See also ==
- List of Medal of Honor recipients
