= Jennifer Weiss (politician) =

American politician from North Carolina

Member of the North Carolina House of Representatives
- In office November 29, 1999 – January 1, 2013
- Preceded by: Jane Hurley Mosley
- Succeeded by: Duane Hall (Redistricting)
- Constituency: 63rd District (1999-2003); 35th District (2003-2013)

Personal details
- Born: October 29, 1959 (age 66) Somerville, New Jersey, U.S.
- Party: Democratic
- Spouse: Bruce Hamilton
- Education: University of North Carolina at Chapel Hill (BA); University of Virginia School of Law (JD)
- Profession: attorney
- Website: Website

Jennifer Weiss (born October 29, 1959) is a former Democratic member of the North Carolina General Assembly and a stay-at-home mom. She represented the state's thirty-fifth House district, located in Wake County.

Weiss was appointed to the NC House November 1999. She is a chair of the Finance Committee. In her tenure, she has received the 2007 NC AARP Outstanding Legislator Award, the 2002 NC Press Association William C. Lassiter First Amendment Award, and the 2004 Advocate of the Year from the NC National Association of Social Workers. In 2001, the Town of Cary issued a proclamation honoring Weiss for her legislative accomplishments.

In 2012, Weiss announced she would not seek re-election.

== Early career ==
Weiss received her bachelor's degree in Political Science from University of North Carolina at Chapel Hill in 1981 and her J.D. from the University of Virginia School of Law in 1986. She practiced corporate and securities law in Boston from 1986 to 1990, at Brown, Rudnick, Freed and Gesmer, where she found the job, in her words, exciting and lucrative, however, she lamented that it failed to satisfy her desire to give back to the community. She resigned five months after her son was born, and the two of them and her husband moved from the Boston area to Cary, North Carolina.

== Committee assignments ==
=== 2011-2012 session ===
- Agriculture
- Elections
- Finance
- Health and Human Services
- Health and Human Services - Mental Health
- Judiciary

=== 2009-2010 session ===
- Aging
- Finance
- Health
- Judiciary II
- Juvenile Justice
- Rules, Calendar, and Operations of the House

== Electoral history ==
=== 2010 ===
North Carolina House of Representatives 35th district general election, 2010
Party	Candidate	Votes	%
Democratic	Jennifer Weiss (incumbent)	13,144	57.48%
Republican	Don Frantz	9,725	42.52%
Total votes		22,869	100%
Democratic hold			

=== 2008 ===
North Carolina House of Representatives 35th district general election, 2008
Party	Candidate	Votes	%
Democratic	Jennifer Weiss (incumbent)	23,633	65.10%
Republican	Eric Weaver	12,667	34.90%
Total votes		36,300	100%
Democratic hold			

=== 2006 ===
North Carolina House of Representatives 35th district general election, 2006
Party	Candidate	Votes	%
Democratic	Jennifer Weiss (incumbent)	13,157	100%
Total votes		13,157	100%
Democratic hold			

=== 2004 ===
North Carolina House of Representatives 35th district general election, 2004
Party	Candidate	Votes	%
Democratic	Jennifer Weiss (incumbent)	22,899	88.86%
Libertarian	Graham Yarko Thomas	2,870	11.14%
Total votes		25,769	100%
Democratic hold			

=== 2002 ===
North Carolina House of Representatives 35th district Democratic primary election, 2002
Party	Candidate	Votes	%
Democratic	Jennifer Weiss (incumbent)	5,410	82.46%
Democratic	Daniel A. Young Sr.	1,151	17.54%
Total votes		6,561	100%

North Carolina House of Representatives 35th district general election, 2002
Party	Candidate	Votes	%
Democratic	Jennifer Weiss (incumbent)	12,907	52.82%
Republican	Darryl Black	10,757	44.02%
Libertarian	Linda Ellis	771	3.16%
Total votes		24,435	100%
Democratic hold			

=== 2000 ===
North Carolina House of Representatives 63rd district general election, 2000
Party	Candidate	Votes	%
Democratic	Jennifer Weiss (incumbent)	16,742	54.99%
Republican	Nancy H. Brown	13,705	45.01%
Total votes		30,447	100%
Democratic hold			

North Carolina House of Representatives
Preceded by Jane Hurley Mosley	Member of the North Carolina House of Representatives from the 63rd district 1999–2003	Succeeded by Alice Bordsen
Preceded by Lorene Coates	Member of the North Carolina House of Representatives from the 35th district 2003–2013	Succeeded by Chris Malone
