= North Carolina's 18th Senate district =

American legislative district

North Carolina's 18th State Senate district
Senator
Haseeb Fatmi; D–Wake Forest
- Demographics: 63% White; 20% Black; 10% Hispanic; 2% Asian; 4% Multiracial
- Population (2024): 210,319

North Carolina's 18th Senate district is one of 50 districts in the North Carolina Senate. The seat has been represented by Democrat Haseeb Fatmi since May 2026.

== Geography ==
Since 2023, the district has covered all of Granville County, as well as part of Wake County. The district overlaps with the 32nd, 34th, 35th, 39th, 40th, and 66th state house districts.

== District officeholders ==
Senator	Party	Dates	Notes	Counties
Ralph Scott (Haw River)	Democratic	January 1, 1973 – January 1, 1981	Redistricted from the 17th district. Lost re-election.	1973–1983; All of Alamance County.
Cary Allred (Burlington)	Republican	January 1, 1981 – January 1, 1983	Redistricted to the 21st district.	1973–1983; All of Alamance County.
R. C. Soles Jr. (Tabor City)	Democratic	January 1, 1983 – January 1, 2003	Redistricted from the 11th district. Redistricted to the 8th district.	1983–1993; All of Bladen, Columbus, and Brunswick counties. Part of Cumberland County.
R. C. Soles Jr. (Tabor City)	Democratic	January 1, 1983 – January 1, 2003	Redistricted from the 11th district. Redistricted to the 8th district.	1993–2003; All of Columbus and Brunswick counties. Parts of Bladen and New Hanover counties.
Wib Gulley (Durham)	Democratic	January 1, 2003 – March 19, 2004	Redistricted from the 13th district. Resigned.	2003–2005; All of Person and Granville counties. Part of Durham County.
Vacant		March 19, 2004 - April 21, 2004		2003–2005; All of Person and Granville counties. Part of Durham County.
Ralph Hunt (Durham)	Democratic	April 21, 2004 – January 1, 2005	Appointed to finish Gulley's term. Retired.	2003–2005; All of Person and Granville counties. Part of Durham County.
Bob Atwater (Chapel Hill)	Democratic	January 1, 2005 – January 1, 2013	Redistricted to the 23rd district and retired.	2005–2013; All of Chatham and Lee counties. Part of Durham County.
Chad Barefoot (Wake Forest)	Republican	January 1, 2013 – January 1, 2019	Retired.	2013–2023; All of Franklin County. Part of Wake County.
John Alexander (Raleigh)	Republican	January 1, 2019 – January 1, 2021	Redistricted from the 15th district. Retired.	2013–2023; All of Franklin County. Part of Wake County.
Sarah Crawford (Raleigh)	Democratic	January 1, 2021 – January 1, 2023	Retired to run for State House.	2013–2023; All of Franklin County. Part of Wake County.
Mary Wills Bode (Oxford)	Democratic	January 1, 2023 – November 21, 2024	Retired and resigned early.	2023–Present; All of Granville County. Part of Wake County.
Vacant		November 21, 2024 – January 1, 2025		2023–Present; All of Granville County. Part of Wake County.
Terence Everitt (Wake Forest)	Democratic	January 1, 2025 – May 1, 2026	Retired and resigned early.	2023–Present; All of Granville County. Part of Wake County.
Vacant		May 1, 2026 – May 21, 2026		2023–Present; All of Granville County. Part of Wake County.
Haseeb Fatmi (Wake Forest)	Democratic	May 21, 2026 – Present	Appointed to finish Everitt's term.	2023–Present; All of Granville County. Part of Wake County.

== Election results ==
=== 2026 ===
North Carolina State Senate 18th district Republican primary election, 2026
Party	Candidate	Votes	%
Republican	Chris Stock	7,636	60.56%
Republican	Cheryl Caulfield	4,972	39.44%
Total votes		12,608	100%

North Carolina Senate 18th district general election, 2026
Party	Candidate	Votes	%
Democratic	Haseeb Fatmi (incumbent)		
Republican	Chris Stock		
Libertarian	Brad Hessel		
Total votes			100%

=== 2024 ===
North Carolina Senate 18th district general election, 2024
Party	Candidate	Votes	%
Democratic	Terence Everitt	59,667	48.47%
Republican	Ashlee Bryan Adams	59,539	48.36%
Libertarian	Brad Hessel	3,906	3.17%
Total votes		123,112	100%
Democratic hold			

=== 2022 ===
North Carolina State Senate 18th district Republican primary election, 2022
Party	Candidate	Votes	%
Republican	E. C. Sykes	11,124	84.86%
Republican	Dimitry Slabyak	1,985	15.14%
Total votes		13,109	100%

North Carolina Senate 18th district general election, 2022
Party	Candidate	Votes	%
Democratic	Mary Wills Bode	42,783	51.36%
Republican	E.C. Sykes	38,296	45.97%
Libertarian	Ryan Brown	2,219	2.66%
Total votes		83,298	100%
Democratic hold			

=== 2020 ===
North Carolina State Senate 18th district Democratic primary election, 2020
Party	Candidate	Votes	%
Democratic	Sarah Crawford	21,630	74.23%
Democratic	Angela F. Bridgman	7,510	25.77%
Total votes		29,140	100%

North Carolina State Senate 18th district Republican primary election, 2020
Party	Candidate	Votes	%
Republican	Larry E. Norman	7,116	51.31%
Republican	Scott McKaig	6,753	48.69%
Total votes		13,869	100%

North Carolina Senate 18th district general election, 2020
Party	Candidate	Votes	%
Democratic	Sarah Crawford	67,912	52.08%
Republican	Larry E. Norman	57,890	44.40%
Libertarian	Jason Loeback	4,595	3.52%
Total votes		130,397	100%
Democratic gain from Republican			

=== 2018 ===
North Carolina Senate 18th district general election, 2018
Party	Candidate	Votes	%
Republican	John Alexander (incumbent)	51,794	49.90%
Democratic	Mack Paul	49,155	47.35%
Libertarian	Brad Hessel	2,855	2.75%
Total votes		103,804	100%
Republican hold			

=== 2016 ===
North Carolina Senate 18th district general election, 2016
Party	Candidate	Votes	%
Republican	Chad Barefoot (incumbent)	57,121	55.34%
Democratic	Gil Johnson	46,105	44.66%
Total votes		103,226	100%
Republican hold			

=== 2014 ===
North Carolina Senate 18th district general election, 2014
Party	Candidate	Votes	%
Republican	Chad Barefoot (incumbent)	34,646	52.89%
Democratic	Sarah Crawford	30,861	47.11%
Total votes		65,507	100%
Republican hold			

=== 2012 ===
North Carolina State Senate 18th district Republican primary election, 2012
Party	Candidate	Votes	%
Republican	Chad Barefoot	9,149	45.91%
Republican	Michael Schriver	8,028	40.29%
Republican	Glen Bradley	2,750	13.80%
Total votes		19,927	100%

North Carolina Senate 18th district general election, 2012
Party	Candidate	Votes	%
Republican	Chad Barefoot	51,873	55.92%
Democratic	Doug Berger (incumbent)	40,897	44.08%
Total votes		92,770	100%
Republican gain from Democratic			

=== 2010 ===
North Carolina Senate 18th district general election, 2010
Party	Candidate	Votes	%
Democratic	Bob Atwater (incumbent)	38,809	59.43%
Republican	Roger Gerber	26,488	40.57%
Total votes		65,297	100%
Democratic hold			

=== 2008 ===
North Carolina Senate 18th district general election, 2008
Party	Candidate	Votes	%
Democratic	Bob Atwater (incumbent)	66,916	69.00%
Republican	Roger Gerber	30,063	31.00%
Total votes		96,979	100%
Democratic hold			

=== 2006 ===
North Carolina Senate 18th district general election, 2006
Party	Candidate	Votes	%
Democratic	Bob Atwater (incumbent)	36,763	100%
Total votes		36,763	100%
Democratic hold			

=== 2004 ===
North Carolina Senate 18th district Democratic primary election, 2004
Party	Candidate	Votes	%
Democratic	Bob Atwater	9,244	52.19%
Democratic	Paul D. Carrington	6,605	37.29%
Democratic	Tommy "Jr." Griffin	1,862	10.51%
Total votes		17,711	100%

North Carolina Senate 18th district general election, 2004
Party	Candidate	Votes	%
Democratic	Bob Atwater	46,875	58.04%
Republican	Christine Mumma	32,709	40.50%
Libertarian	Jon Guze	1,186	1.47%
Total votes		80,770	100%
Democratic hold			

=== 2002 ===
North Carolina Senate 18th district general election, 2002
Party	Candidate	Votes	%
Democratic	Wib Gulley (incumbent)	27,335	46.23%
Republican	Tom Davidson	19,706	40.53%
Libertarian	Mark Kitchens	1,576	3.24%
Total votes		48,617	100%
Democratic hold			

=== 2000 ===
North Carolina Senate 18th district general election, 2000
Party	Candidate	Votes	%
Democratic	R. C. Soles Jr. (incumbent)	39,389	79.52%
Libertarian	John Evans	10,147	20.48%
Total votes		49,536	100%
Democratic hold			
