= Angel Resource Institute =

American nonprofit organization

- Abbreviation: ARI
- Formation: 2005
- Type: Non-profit
- Headquarters: Wilmington, NC, United States
- Key people: Susan Preston; Ross Finlay; Gwen Edwards
- Website: www.angelresourceinstitute.org

The Angel Resource Institute (ARI), formerly Angel Capital Education Foundation (ACEF), is an American nonprofit organization that carries out research and educational activities related to the field of angel investing. It was created in 2005 by the Ewing Marion Kauffman Foundation as a sister charity to the Angel Capital Association (ACA), a non-profit organization that represents angel investment groups in North America that was previously founded by Kauffman.

ARI's four primary educational activities are its "Power of Angel Investing" series of educational seminars; co-hosting the annual "Angel Investing Summit" conferences with ACA; publication of printed and online material related to angel investing; and conducting research surveys of angel investing activity in North America. Among other material on its website is a comprehensive list of links to legitimate angel groups in the US and Canada.
