= Lucy T. Allen =

American politician (born 1941)

Member of the North Carolina House of Representatives from the 49th district
- In office January 29, 2003 – April 12, 2010
- Preceded by: Constituency Established
- Succeeded by: John May

Personal details
- Born: November 29, 1941 (age 84) Raleigh, North Carolina
- Party: Democratic
- Children: Sonny, Hill, Stuart
- Education: Meredith College (BA)

Lucy Taylor Allen (born November 29, 1941) is a former Democratic member of the North Carolina General Assembly.

== Political career ==
She represented the state's forty-ninth House district, including constituents in Franklin, Halifax and Nash counties, from her first election in 2002 through 2010. Allen is a former teacher from Louisburg, North Carolina, and served as the mayor of Louisburg (1985–2001). From 1972–1980, Allen served as a member of the Franklin County Board of Education. Allen is an Episcopalian.

Allen also served as a member of the Franklin County Board of Education, Mayor of Louisburg, North Carolina, a member of the Electricities Board of Directors, and was President of the League of Municipalities. During her time in the assembly she was Chairman of the Environment Committee for two terms and served as a co-chair of the Environmental Review Commission.

In 2010, Allen resigned from the legislature to accept an appointment to the state Utilities Commission, effective April 12. John May was appointed as her replacement in the House.

North Carolina House of Representatives
Preceded by Mitch Gillespie	Member of the North Carolina House of Representatives from the 49th district 2002–2010	Succeeded by John May
