= Hong Kong Police Headquarters =

Coordinates: 22.27872°N 114.16818°E

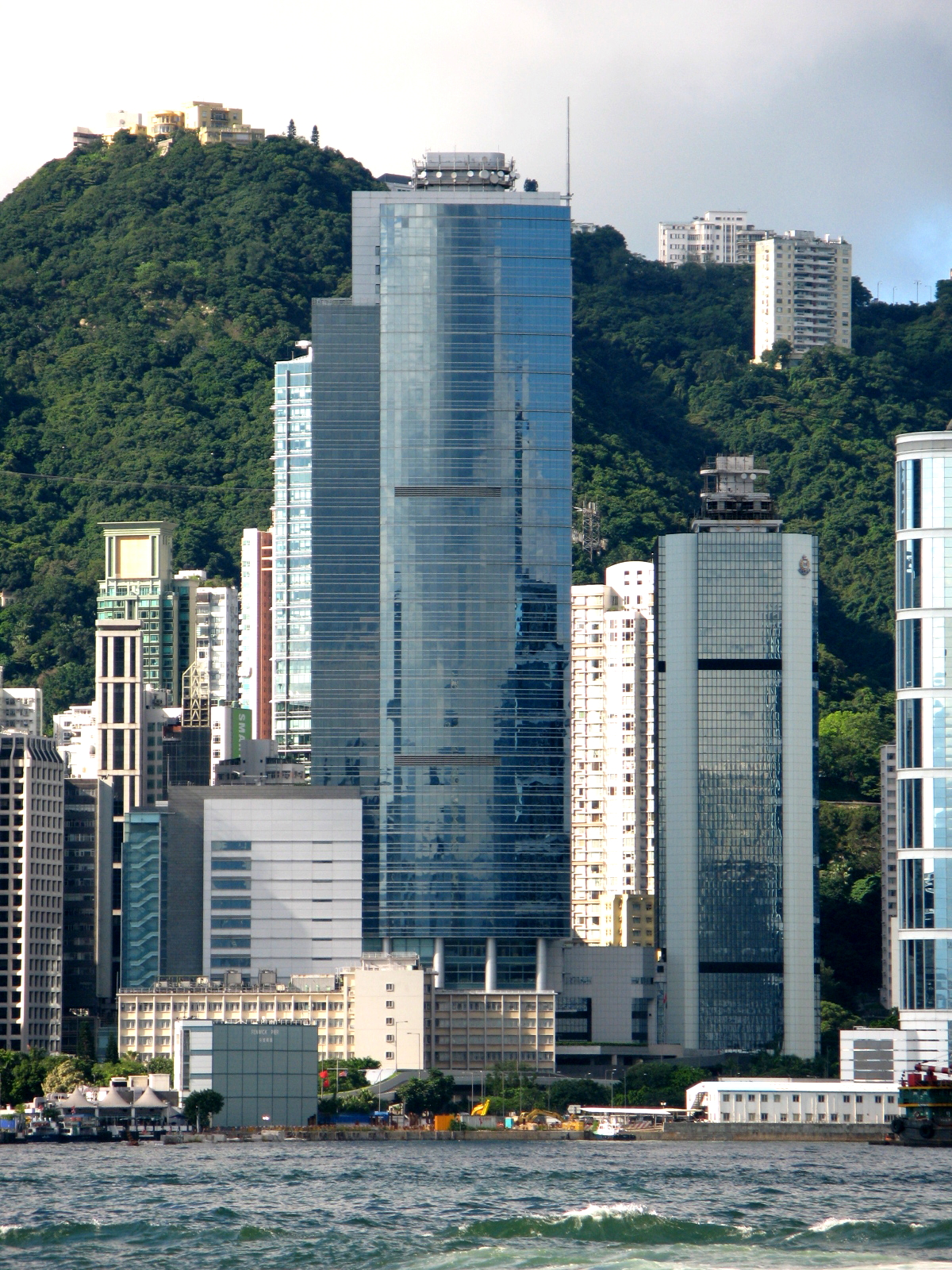
- Hong Kong Police Headquarters Compound/Arsenal street

General information
- Status: Operating
- Type: Office
- Location: 1 Arsenal Street, Wan Chai, Hong Kong
- Construction started: 2002; 24 years ago
- Completed: 2004; 22 years ago
- Opening: 12 March 2005; 21 years ago
- Owner: The Facade Group

Height
- Roof: 206 m (676 ft)

Technical details
- Floor count: 47
- Floor area: 135,500 m^{2} (1,459,000 sq ft)

Design and construction
- Architect: Hong Kong Architectural Services Department
- Structural engineer: China State Construction and Engineering Corporation
- Main contractor: Hip Hing Construction Co. Ltd.

The Hong Kong Police Headquarters (Chinese: 香港警察總部) or HKPHQ are located at 1 Arsenal Street, Wan Chai, on Hong Kong Island. It is the headquarters of the Hong Kong Police Force.

The headquarters complex comprises several buildings, including Arsenal House (including main building, East and West Wing) and Caine House. As at December 2010, 5,202 police officers and 2,032 civilian officers are deployed in this headquarters.

Hong Kong Police Headquarters
- Traditional Chinese: 香港警察總部
- Simplified Chinese: 香港警察总部
Transcriptions
Standard Mandarin
- Hanyu Pinyin: Xiānggǎng Jǐngchá Zǒngbù
Yue: Cantonese
- Jyutping: hoeng1 gong2 ging2 caat3 zung2 bou6

== History ==
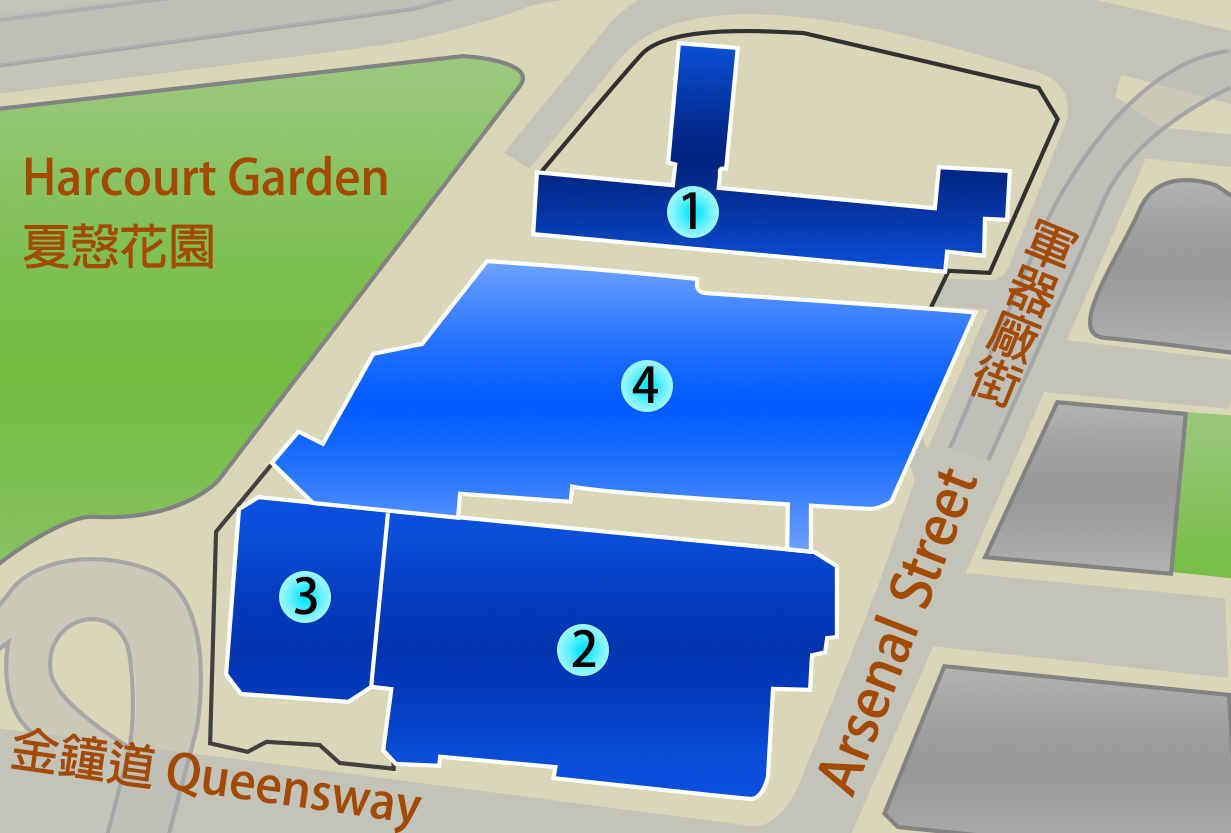
1: Caine House (Established in 1952) 2: Arsenal House (East Wing) (Established in 1990, formerly Arsenal House) 3: Arsenal House (West Wing) (Established in 1997): 4. Arsenal House (Established in 2005)

=== Caine House ===
In 1864, first Hong Kong police headquarters was built at the junction with Hollywood Road and Wyndham Street. After early World War II, the headquarters moved to Oriental Emporium at Connaught Road West.

In the 1950s, the colonial government gave the new reclaimed land to the police force to construct a new headquarters, replacing the Central Police Station. After several extensions, the Caine House was completed in 1952. It was named after William Caine, the founder of Hong Kong Police Force. May House is named after the first Police Magistrate, Charlie May.

=== Arsenal House ===
In September 1987, the Police Married Quarters was demolished and the project "Redevelopment of Police Headquarters, Arsenal Street, Wanchai" was launched in December 1993. The Redevelopment was divided into two phases: Arsenal House opened in 1990; Arsenal House (West Wing) opened in 1997.

On 23 April 1997, ten years after the redevelopment, due to ageing facilities within May House, the Royal Hong Kong Police Force submitted the advice of police headquarters alteration, at a cost of 230 million Hong Kong dollars, to the Provisional Legislative Council Public Works Subcommittee. The members thought it is not economic benefit and they requested a long-term redevelopment plan for the police headquarters. After several discussions, the police force and the Legislative Council agreed to demolish May House and the car park site, while the two Arsenal Houses building remained. This plan was estimated to save rent of 34 million Hong Kong dollars every year for the police force. After the redevelopment, the Caine House and Wan Chai Police Station had been replanned.

The new complex (main building) project launched in 2002 and completed in 2004. It cost two billion dollars. On 12 March 2005, the opening ceremony was held by the Hong Kong Chief Executive Donald Tsang, Security Bureau Ambrose Lee Siu-kwong and Commissioner of Police Lee Ming-kwai. This new complex is named as "Arsenal House". The former building with the same name are converted from Arsenal House to Arsenal House (East Wing).

== Design ==
Arsenal House became a skyscraper located in the Wan Chai district of Hong Kong. The tower rises 47 floors and 206 metres (676 ft) in height. It was designed by the Architectural Services Department, and was developed by The Facade Group. Arsenal House, which stands as the 43rd-tallest building in Hong Kong and is tied in rank with the Three Garden Road, Central, is composed entirely of commercial office units. It has a total floor area of 135,500 square metres (1,459,000 sq ft).

Facilities include 200-seat multi-use hall, 300-seat lecture theatre and an indoor shooting range. Police Licences Office, Crime Prevention Bureau Exhibition, Media Conference Room and Police Recruitment Division Conversation Room locate at lower block of the Arsenal House. Lower block is also the office of Wan Chai Division Police Station. The East and West Wing are used as office by the other police units. The Caine House are re-planned for Hong Kong Island Regional Headquarters and Hong Kong Island Emergency Unit Headquarters.

== Gallery ==
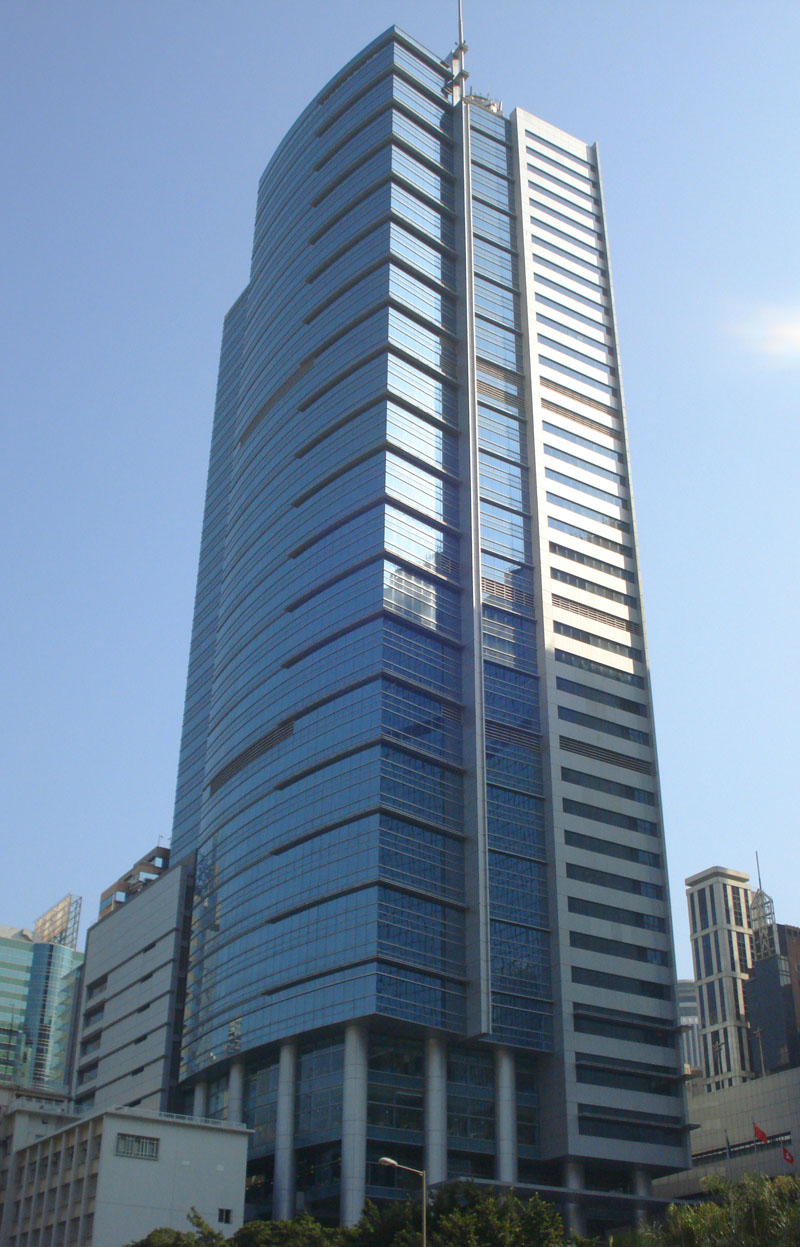
Arsenal House (Main Building)

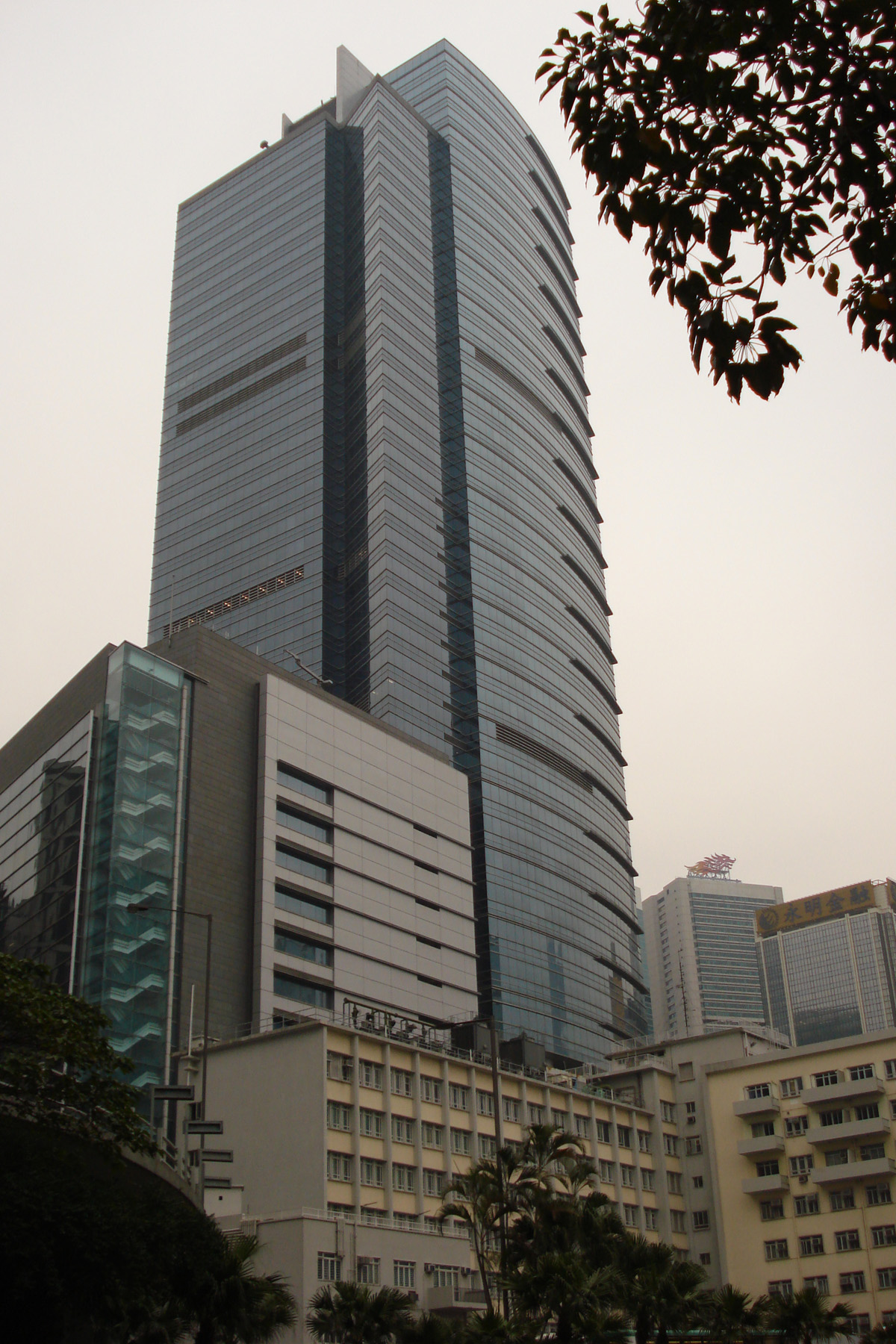
Arsenal House (Main Building) with upper and lower block and Caine House

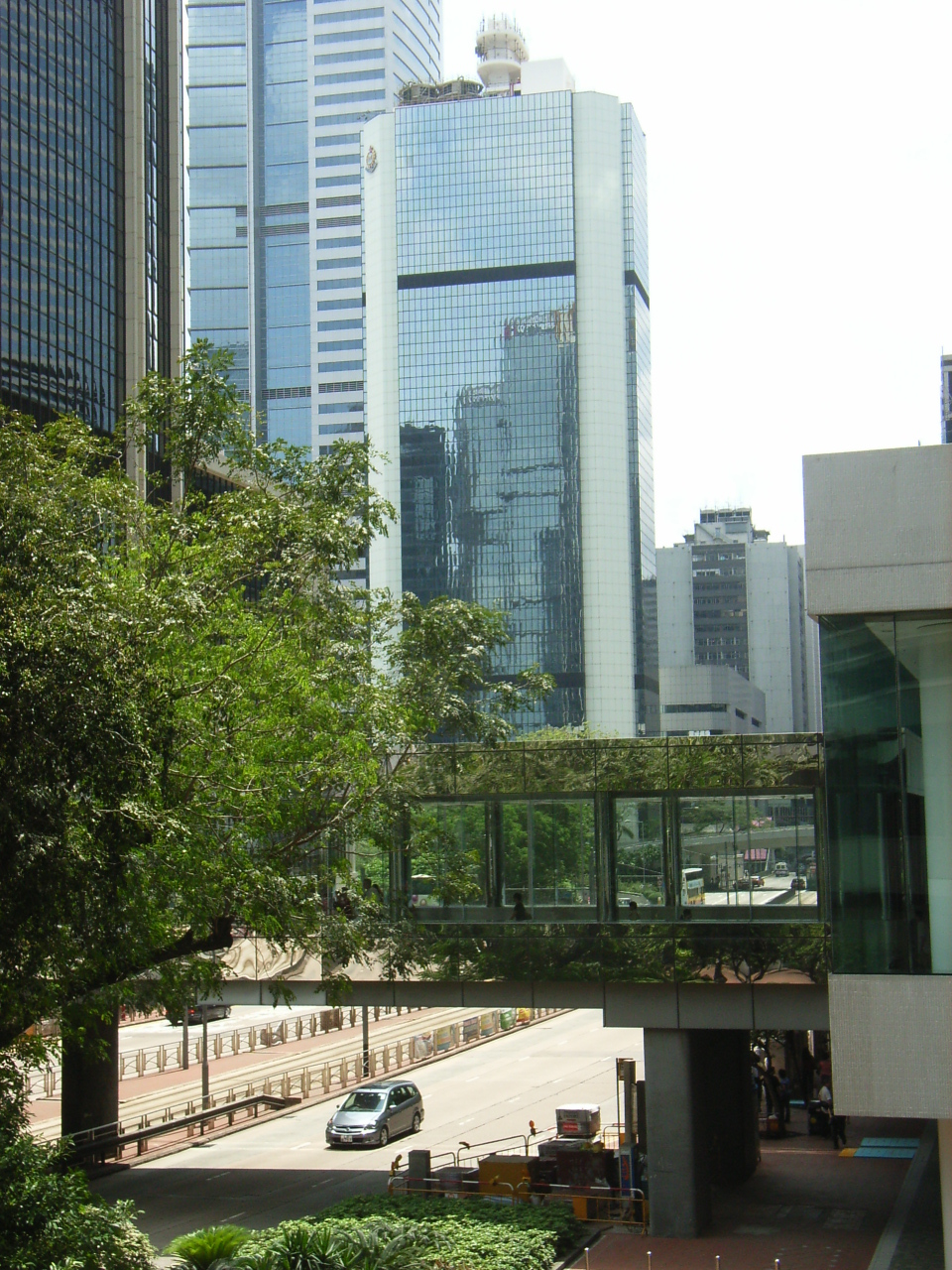
Arsenal House (West Wing)

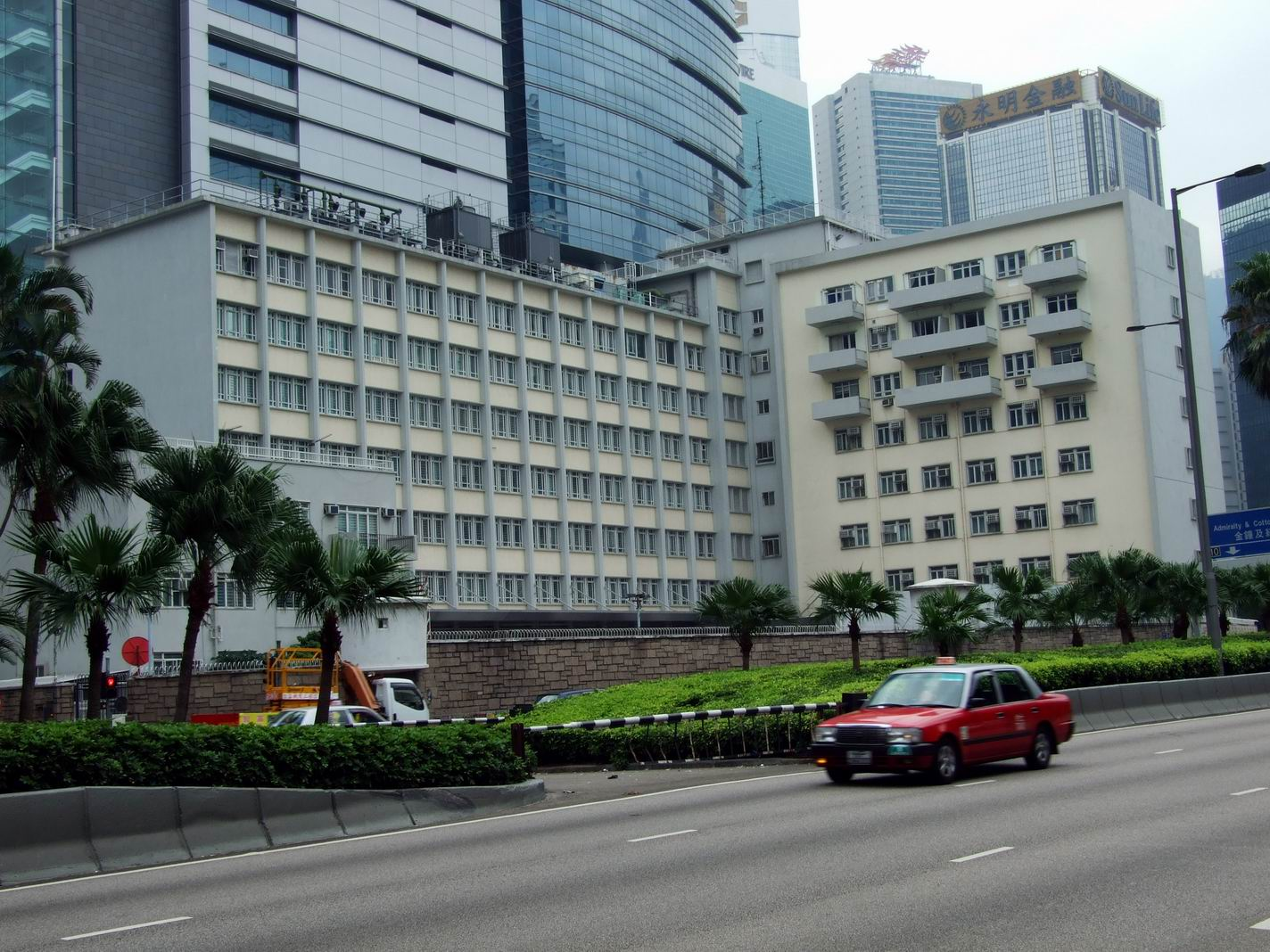
Caine House

== See also ==
- List of tallest buildings in Hong Kong
- Charles May (police officer)
