= John May (police officer) =

British police commander (1775–1855)

Superintendent John May (1775–1855) was the first commander of the Metropolitan Police "A" Division, which policed the Whitehall area of London. Since the divisional station house was adjacent to the offices of the Joint Commissioners, Charles Rowan and Richard Mayne, May began to serve as unofficial second-in-command of the force, providing a link between the Commissioners and their men. It was he who interviewed the first candidates for the force, sifting them before Rowan and Mayne made their final selection.

Before joining the police, May was a sergeant major in the Grenadier Guards.

He was the father of Edmund George May (1821?–1880) and Charles May. The latter also initially served in the Metropolitan Police, but made his name as the head of the police in Hong Kong.
