= Glen Bradley =

American politician

Representative Glen Bradley
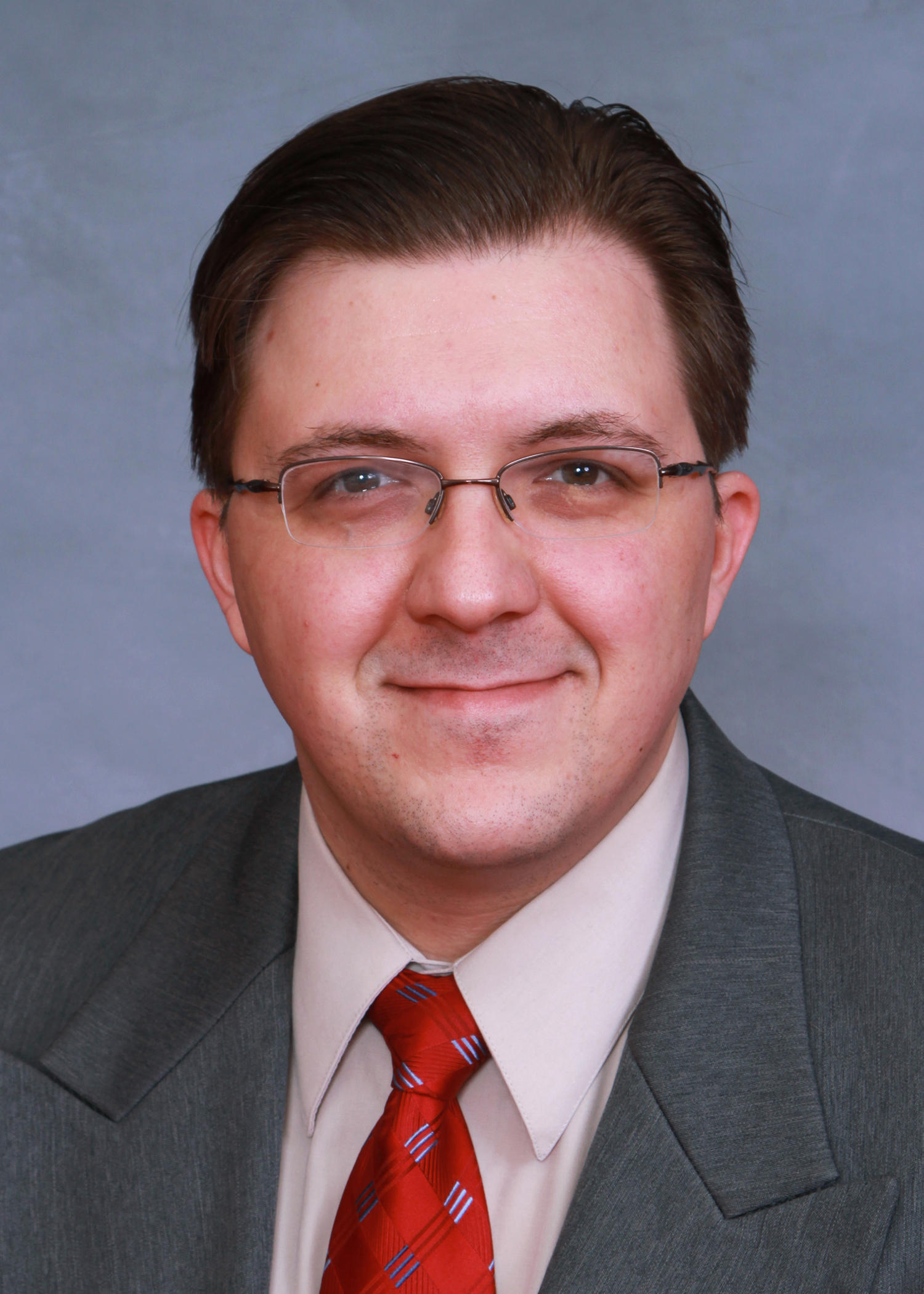

Member of the North Carolina House of Representatives from the 49th district
- In office January 2011 – January 2013
- Preceded by: John May
- Succeeded by: Jim Fulghum

Personal details
- Born: September 11, 1973 (age 52) Portsmouth, Virginia, U.S.
- Party: Republican
- Education: Southeastern Baptist Theological Seminary
- Occupation: Self-Employed/Computer Network
- Website: glenbradley.com

Glen Bradley (born September 11, 1973) is a former member of the North Carolina House of Representatives. A Republican, he represented the 49th District of North Carolina for one term. Bradley previously served as a US Marine Corps Corporal/Intelligence Analyst from 1993-1997.

== Biography ==
Bradley defeated Democrat John May in the general election held on November 2, 2010 with 51% of the vote. Bradley's election signaled a wide swing in the district, which had voted for former Democratic representative Lucy T. Allen 58%-41% over Keith Shearon in 2008.

In the House, Bradley filed bills to study whether or not the state should authorize an alternative currency, and to require the state to accept gold and silver as legal tender.

Bradley ran for the North Carolina Senate in 2012 but lost the Republican primary on May 8, 2012. He finished in last place out of three candidates, getting about 14% of the vote, behind winner Chad Barefoot (46%) and second-place finisher Michael Schriver (40%).

In 2013, Bradley ran for Vice-Chair of the North Carolina Republican Party at the state convention (June 7–9, 2013). He lost to Joyce Krawiec, placing second in a four-person field.

== Election history ==
North Carolina House of Representatives District 49, November 2, 2010
Party	Candidate	Votes	%	±%
Republican	Glen Bradley	11,276	51.68%	+10.27%
Democratic	John May	10,544	48.32%	−10.27%
Majority		732	3.36%	
Total votes		21,820	100	

North Carolina State Senate GOP Primary District 18, May 8, 2012
Party	Candidate	Votes	%	±%
Republican	Chad Barefoot	9,112	45.92%	N/A
Republican	Michael Schriver	7,999	40.31%	N/A
Republican	Glen Bradley	2,733	13.77%	−37.91%
Majority		1,113	5.61%	
Total votes		19,844	100	
