= World Business Angels Association =

Non-profit organisation

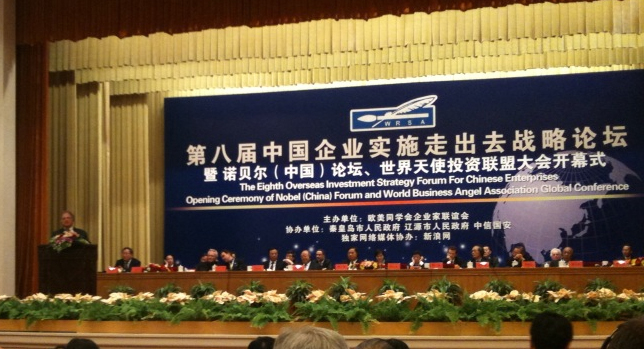
WBAA Global Conference, 2009

The World Business Angels Association (WBAA) was an international, not-for-profit organization whose mission was to stimulate the exchange of knowledge and best practices in the field of global angel capital financing for high-growth and innovative startups. It was closed around 2017.

It was based in Brussels and the WBAA was formed by the leaders of twelve national business angel federations to create an international community of business angel networks and leaders for the promotion of innovation and entrepreneurship through the financing of high-growth start-up companies with the support of business angels worldwide.

== History ==
The organizational meeting of the WBAA was in Estoril, Portugal, on October 10, 2007 and was co-organized by Portuguese Business Angels Federation (FNABA), European Business Angels Network (EBAN) and US Angel Capital Association (ACA). A follow-up meeting of the organization's Charter Members was held on April 19, 2009 in Dubai, leading to the Inaugural World Business Angels Association Global Conference in Beijing, China on December 5–6, 2009.

== Membership ==
WBAA was an NGO whose direct members are national federations, which in turn represent business angel groups and networks in their respective countries. Neither business angel groups themselves, nor individual business angel investors, are members of WBAA, although they may be involved with the organization in other ways and participate actively in its programs. Countries whose national business angel federations are represented in the organization include Australia, Chile, China, France, Germany, India, Italy, New Zealand, Panama, Portugal, Scotland, Spain, United Arab Emirates, United Kingdom, and the United States, as well as the European Union.

== Mission ==
The primary mission of the WBAA was to raise global awareness of the importance and practice of business angel investment, stimulate the exchange of best practices in angel investing, and enhance the development of cross-border angel investing. It did this by promoting the professionalization of the angel market through the fostering of angel groups and associations; coordinating research produced on the angel market worldwide; standardizing terminology at an international level regarding angel investing; organizing in-person meetings and conferences for international angel investors; and developing online resources for information about, and access to, local, regional and cross-border angel investing resources.

== See also ==
- Angel investor
