= 2018 United States House of Representatives elections in North Carolina =

- November 6, 2018

All 13 North Carolina seats to the United States House of Representatives
- Turnout: 52.97%
	Majority party	Minority party
Party	Republican	Democratic
Last election	10	3
Seats won	10	3
Seat change	Steady	Steady
Popular vote	1,846,041	1,771,061
Percentage	50.39%	48.35%
Swing	▼2.83%	▲1.75%

Republican
40–50%
50–60%
60–70%
70–80%
80–90%
90–100%
Democratic
50–60%
60–70%
70–80%
80–90%

The 2018 United States House of Representatives elections in North Carolina were held on November 6, 2018, electing the thirteen U.S. representatives from the State of North Carolina, one from each of the state's congressional districts. The elections coincided with other elections to the House of Representatives, elections to the United States Senate, and various state and local elections.

As of 2026, this is the last time where North Carolina used the same congressional map for at least two consecutive election cycles.

Primary elections in twelve of the thirteen districts were held on May 8, 2018.

== Overview ==
=== Statewide ===
Party	Candidates	Votes		Seats		
Party	Candidates	No.	%	No.	+/–	%
Republican	13	1,846,039	50.39%	9	Steady	76.92%
Democratic	12	1,771,055	48.35%	3	Steady	23.08%
Libertarian	5	38,728	1.06%	0	Steady	0.00%
Constitution	1	4,665	0.13%	0	Steady	0.00%
Green	1	2,831	0.08%	0	Steady	0.00%
Total	32	3,663,326	100.00%	12	Steady	100.00%

Popular vote
Republican	50.39%
Democratic	48.35%
Libertarian	1.06%
Other	1.26%

House seats
Republican	76.92%
Democratic	23.08%

=== District ===
Results of the 2018 United States House of Representatives elections in North Carolina by district:

District	Republican		Democratic		Others		Total		Result
District	Votes	%	Votes	%	Votes	%	Votes	%	Result
District 1	82,218	30.15%	190,457	69.85%	0	0.00%	272,675	100.00%	Democratic hold
District 2	170,072	51.27%	151,977	45.82%	9,655	2.91%	331,704	100.00%	Republican hold
District 3	187,901	100.00%	0	0.00%	0	0.00%	187,901	100.00%	Republican hold
District 4	82,052	24.03%	247,067	72.37%	12,284	3.60%	341,403	100.00%	Democratic hold
District 5	159,917	57.04%	120,468	42.96%	0	0.00%	280,385	100.00%	Republican hold
District 6	160,709	56.52%	123,651	43.48%	0	0.00%	284,360	100.00%	Republican hold
District 7	156,809	55.55%	120,838	42.80%	4,665	1.65%	282,312	100.00%	Republican hold
District 8	141,402	55.35%	114,119	44.65%	0	0.00%	255,521	100.00%	Republican hold
District 9	~~139,246~~	~~49.25%~~	~~138,341~~	~~48.93%~~	~~5,130~~	~~1.81%~~	~~282,717~~	~~100.00%~~	Re-run ordered
District 10	164,969	59.29%	113,259	40.71%	0	0.00%	278,228	100.00%	Republican hold
District 11	178,012	59.21%	116,508	38.75%	6,146	2.04%	300,666	100.00%	Republican hold
District 12	75,164	26.93%	203,974	73.07%	0	0.00%	279,138	100.00%	Democratic hold
District 13	147,570	51.54%	130,402	45.54%	8,344	2.91%	286,316	100.00%	Republican hold
Total	1,846,041	50.39%	1,771,061	48.35%	46,224	1.26%	3,663,326	100.00%	

== District 1 ==
2018 North Carolina's 1st congressional district election
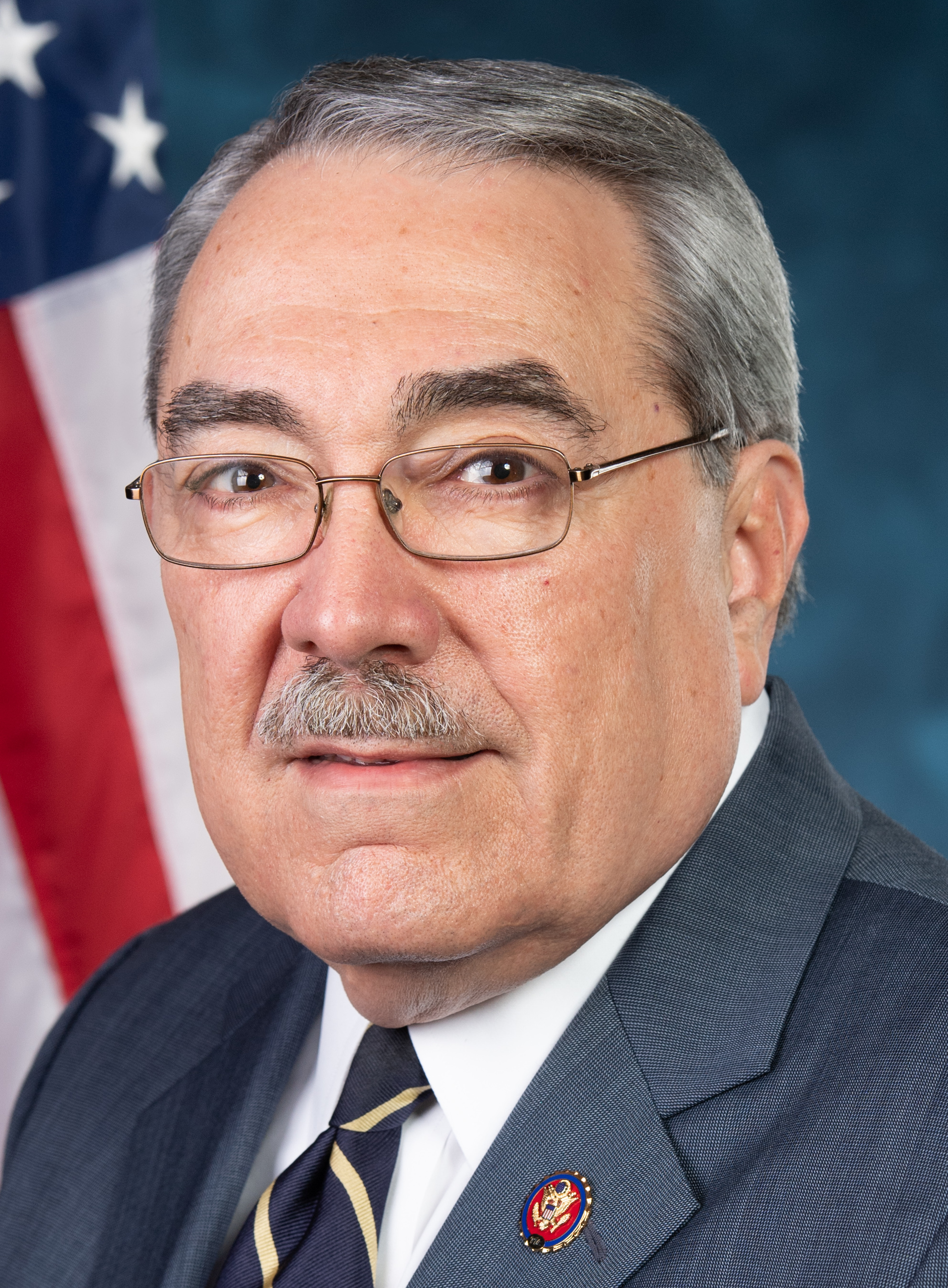

Nominee	G. K. Butterfield	Roger Allison
Party	Democratic	Republican
Popular vote	190,457	82,218
Percentage	69.9%	30.1%
- County results Butterfield: 50–60% 60–70% 70–80% 80–90%
U.S. Representative before election
G. K. Butterfield
Democratic
Elected U.S. Representative
G. K. Butterfield
Democratic

Incumbent Democrat G. K. Butterfield, who had represented the district since 2004, ran for re-election. He was re-elected with 69% of the vote in 2016. The district had a PVI of D+17.

=== Democratic primary ===
==== Candidates ====
===== Nominee =====
- G. K. Butterfield, incumbent U.S. representative

=== Republican primary ===
==== Candidates ====
===== Nominee =====
- Roger Allison, businessman

=== General election ===
==== Predictions ====
Source	Ranking	As of
The Cook Political Report	Safe D	November 5, 2018
Inside Elections	Safe D	November 5, 2018
Sabato's Crystal Ball	Safe D	November 5, 2018
RCP	Safe D	November 5, 2018
Daily Kos	Safe D	November 5, 2018
538	Safe D	November 7, 2018
CNN	Safe D	October 31, 2018
Politico	Safe D	November 2, 2018

==== Endorsements ====
G. K. Butterfield (D)

Labor unions

- AFL-CIO
- International Brotherhood of Boilermakers

Organizations

- End Citizens United
- Sierra Club

==== Results ====
North Carolina's 1st congressional district, 2018
Party	Candidate	Votes	%
Democratic	G. K. Butterfield (incumbent)	190,457	69.9
Republican	Roger Allison	82,218	30.1
Total votes		272,675	100.0
Democratic hold			

== District 2 ==
2018 North Carolina's 2nd congressional district election
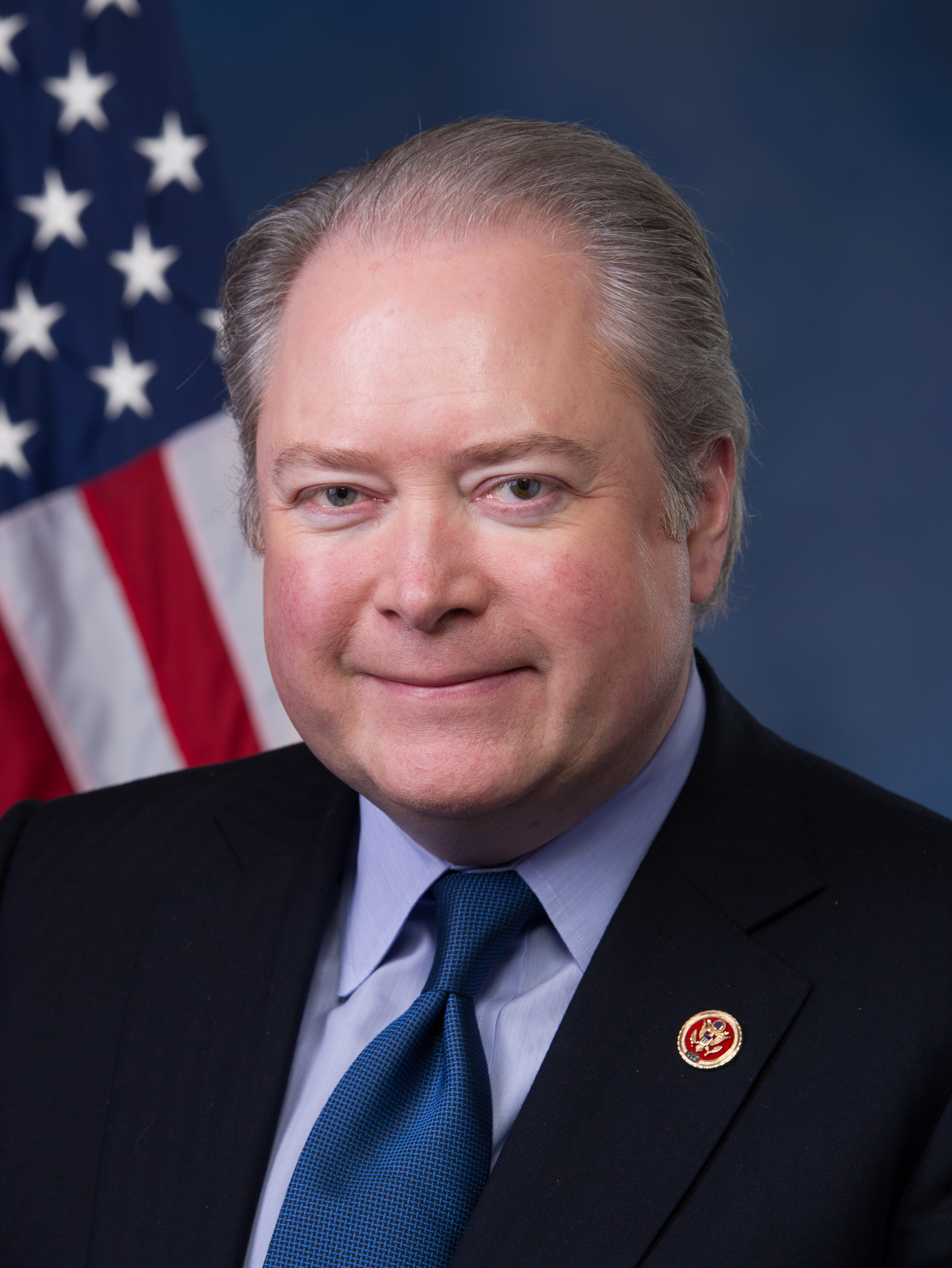

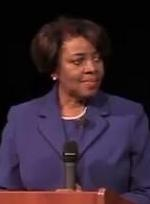
Nominee	George Holding	Linda Coleman
Party	Republican	Democratic
Popular vote	170,072	151,977
Percentage	51.3%	45.8%
- County results Holding: 40–50% 50–60% 60–70% Coleman: 40–50%
U.S. Representative before election
George Holding
Republican
Elected U.S. Representative
George Holding
Republican

Incumbent Republican George Holding, who had represented the district since 2017, and had previously represented the 13th district between 2013 and 2017, ran for re-election. He was re-elected with 57% of the vote in 2016. The district had a PVI of R+7.

=== Republican primary ===
==== Candidates ====
===== Nominee =====
- George Holding, incumbent U.S. representative

===== Eliminated in primary =====
- Allen Chesser II, law enforcement officer

==== Primary results ====
Republican primary results
Party	Candidate	Votes	%
Republican	George Holding (incumbent)	17,979	76.2
Republican	Allen Chesser II	5,612	23.8
Total votes		23,591	100.0

=== Democratic primary ===
The Democratic Congressional Campaign Committee included North Carolina's 2nd congressional district on its initial list of Republican-held seats considered targets in 2018.

==== Candidates ====
===== Nominee =====
- Linda Coleman, former state representative and nominee for lieutenant governor in 2012 & 2016

===== Eliminated in primary =====
- Wendy May, military veteran and former firefighter, minister and journalist
- Ken Romley, entrepreneur

===== Withdrawn =====
- Sam Searcy, business executive (running for state senate)

==== Endorsements ====
Wendy May

Organizations

- Equality North Carolina

==== Primary results ====
Democratic primary results
Party	Candidate	Votes	%
Democratic	Linda Coleman	18,650	56.0
Democratic	Ken Romley	10,742	32.3
Democratic	Wendy May	3,895	11.7
Total votes		33,287	100.0

=== Libertarian primary ===
==== Candidates ====
===== Nominee =====
- Jeff Matemu

=== General election ===
==== Endorsements ====
George Holding (R)

Organizations

- BIPAC
Linda Coleman (D)

U.S. representatives

- Alma Adams, U.S. representative from North Carolina's 12th congressional district (2016–present)
- Joyce Beatty, U.S. representative from Ohio's 3rd congressional district (2013–present)
- G. K. Butterfield, U.S. representative from North Carolina's 1st congressional district (2004–present)
- Barbara Lee, U.S. representative from California's 13th congressional district (1998–present)
- David Price, U.S. representative from North Carolina's 6th congressional district (1987–1995, 1997–present)

Labor unions

- AFL-CIO
- Communications Workers of America
- International Brotherhood of Boilermakers

Organizations

- Congressional Black Caucus
- Democratic Congressional Campaign Committee "Red to Blue" Program
- EMILY's List
- End Citizens United
- Equality North Carolina
- League of Conservation Voters Action Fund
- Moms Demand Action
- MoveOn
- Sierra Club

==== Polling ====
Poll source	Date(s) administered	Sample size	Margin of error	George Holding (R)	Linda Coleman (D)	Jeff Matemu (L)	Undecided
SurveyUSA	October 24–28, 2018	565	± 4.5%	49%	40%	2%	9%
SurveyUSA	September 5–8, 2018	538	± 4.9%	43%	44%	2%	10%
GQR Research (D-Coleman)	August 23–27, 2018	401	± 4.9%	44%	45%	5%	6%

==== Predictions ====
Source	Ranking	As of
The Cook Political Report	Lean R	November 5, 2018
Inside Elections	Lean R	November 5, 2018
Sabato's Crystal Ball	Lean R	November 5, 2018
RCP	Lean R	November 5, 2018
Daily Kos	Lean R	November 5, 2018
538	Likely R	November 7, 2018
CNN	Lean R	October 31, 2018
Politico	Tossup	November 4, 2018

==== Results ====
North Carolina's 2nd congressional district, 2018
Party	Candidate	Votes	%
Republican	George Holding (incumbent)	170,072	51.3
Democratic	Linda Coleman	151,977	45.8
Libertarian	Jeff Matemu	9,655	2.9
Total votes		331,704	100.0
Republican hold			

== District 3 ==
2018 North Carolina's 3rd congressional district election
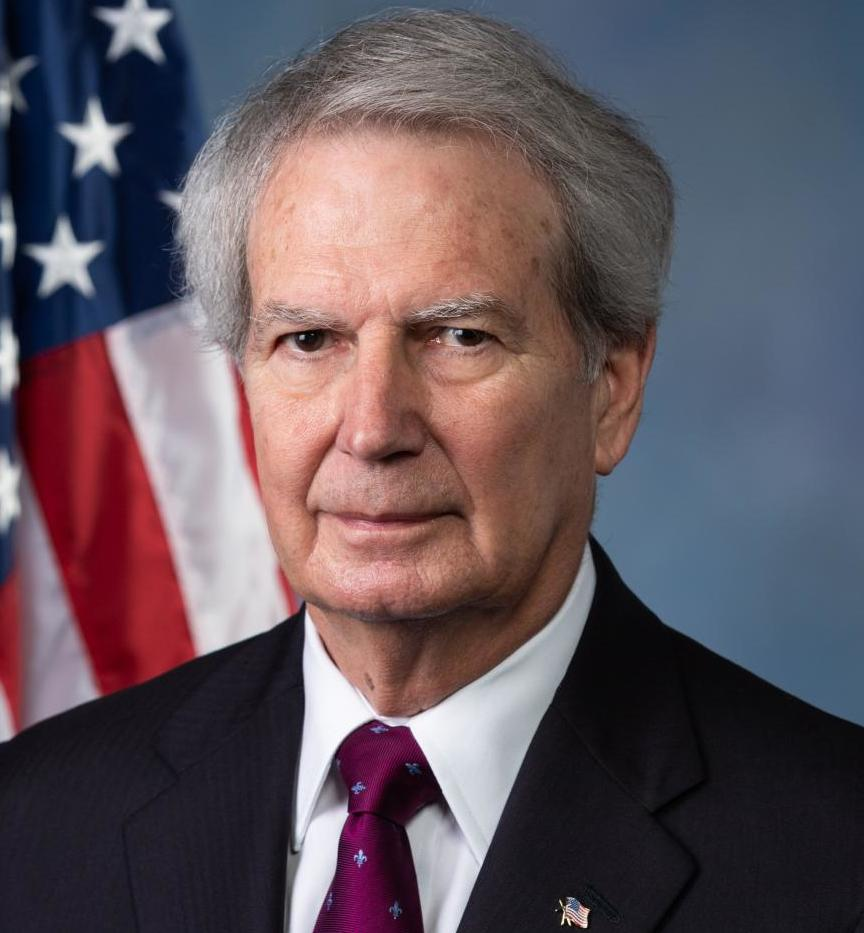
Nominee	Walter B. Jones Jr.
Party	Republican
Popular vote	187,901
Percentage	100.0%
U.S. Representative before election
Walter B. Jones Jr.
Republican
Elected U.S. Representative
Walter B. Jones Jr.
Republican

Incumbent Republican Walter B. Jones Jr., who had represented the district since 1995, ran for re-election. He was re-elected with 67% of the vote in 2016. The district had a PVI of R+12.

=== Republican primary ===
==== Candidates ====
===== Nominee =====
- Walter B. Jones Jr., incumbent U.S. representative

===== Eliminated in primary =====
- Scott Dacey, vice-chairman of the Craven County Board of Commissioners
- Phil Law, former U.S. Marine

==== Endorsements ====
Scott Dacey

Statewide officials

- Mike Huckabee, former governor of Arkansas and former presidential candidate

Individuals

- Herman Cain, former presidential candidate

==== Primary results ====
Republican primary results
Party	Candidate	Votes	%
Republican	Walter B. Jones, Jr. (incumbent)	20,963	43.0
Republican	Phil Law	14,343	29.4
Republican	Scott Dacey	13,421	27.5
Total votes		48,727	100.0

=== General election ===
==== Predictions ====
Source	Ranking	As of
The Cook Political Report	Safe R	November 5, 2018
Inside Elections	Safe R	November 5, 2018
Sabato's Crystal Ball	Safe R	November 5, 2018
RCP	Safe R	November 5, 2018
Daily Kos	Safe R	November 5, 2018
538	Safe R	November 7, 2018
CNN	Safe R	October 31, 2018
Politico	Safe R	November 4, 2018

==== Results ====
North Carolina's 3rd congressional district, 2018
Party	Candidate	Votes	%
Republican	Walter B. Jones, Jr. (incumbent)	187,901	100.0
Total votes		187,901	100.0
Republican hold			

== District 4 ==
2018 North Carolina's 4th congressional district election
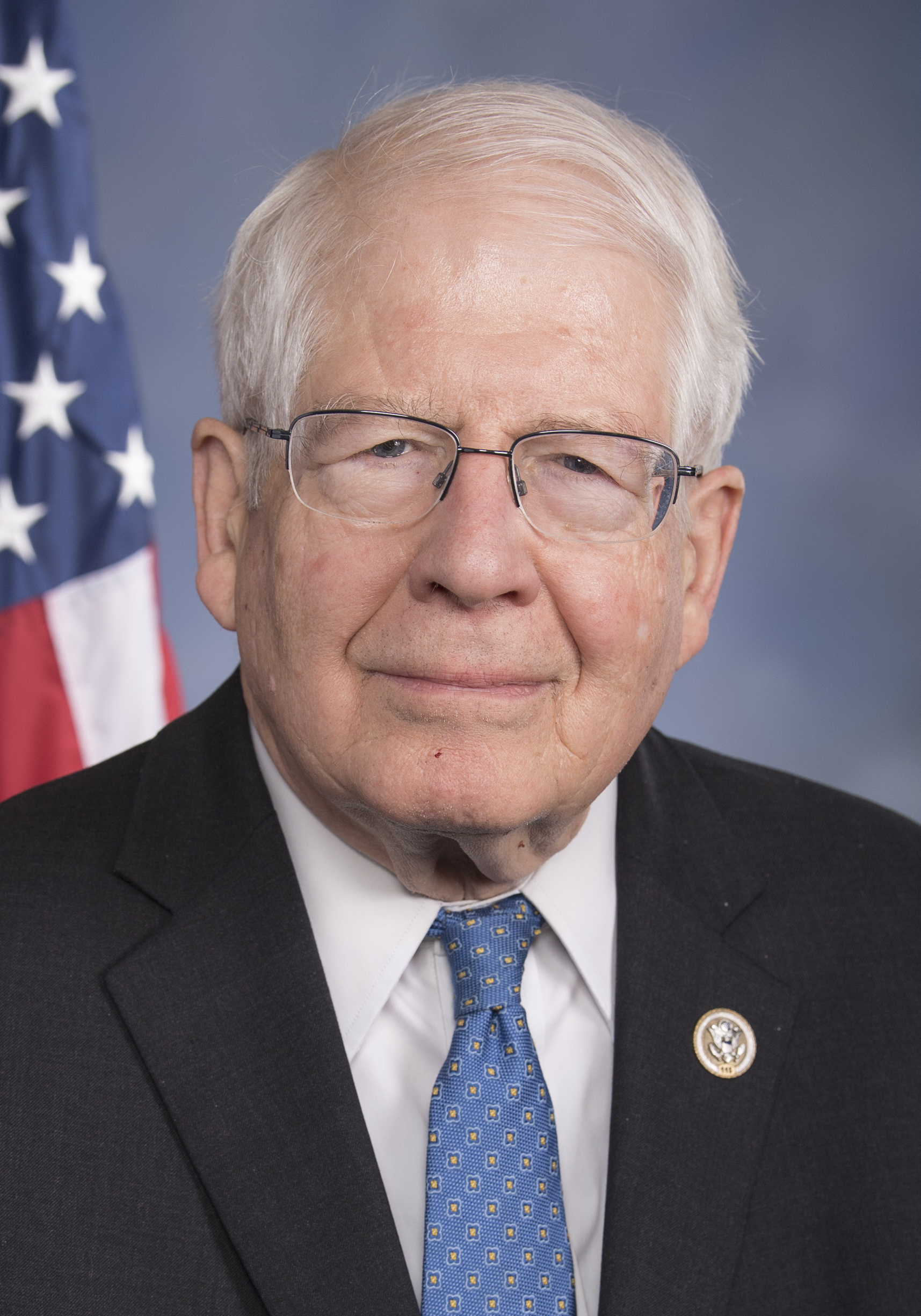

Nominee	David Price	Steve Von Loor
Party	Democratic	Republican
Popular vote	247,067	82,052
Percentage	72.4%	24.0%
- County results Price: 70–80% 80–90%
U.S. Representative before election
David Price
Democratic
Elected U.S. Representative
David Price
Democratic

Incumbent Democrat David Price, who had represented the district since 1997, and previously between 1987 and 1995, ran for re-election. He was re-elected with 68% of the vote in 2016. The district had a PVI of D+17.

=== Democratic primary ===
==== Candidates ====
===== Nominee =====
- David Price, incumbent U.S. representative

===== Eliminated in primary =====
- Michelle Laws, professor
- Richard Lee Watkins III, academic

==== Endorsements ====
David Price

Organizations

- Equality North Carolina
Richard Watkins

Organizations

- Brand New Congress

==== Primary results ====
Democratic primary results
Party	Candidate	Votes	%
Democratic	David Price (incumbent)	52,203	77.1
Democratic	Michelle Laws	11,120	16.4
Democratic	Richard Lee Watkins III	4,391	6.5
Total votes		67,714	100.0

=== Republican primary ===
==== Candidates ====
===== Nominee =====
- Steve Von Loor, business owner

===== Withdrawn =====
- Lee Brian, videographer

=== Libertarian primary ===
==== Candidates ====
===== Nominee =====
- Barbara Howe, homemaker

===== Eliminated in primary =====
- Scerry Whitlock

==== Primary results ====
Libertarian primary results
Party	Candidate	Votes	%
Libertarian	Barbara Howe	528	76.9
Libertarian	Scerry Perry Whitlock	159	23.1
Total votes		687	100.0

=== General election ===
==== Predictions ====
Source	Ranking	As of
The Cook Political Report	Safe D	November 5, 2018
Inside Elections	Safe D	November 5, 2018
Sabato's Crystal Ball	Safe D	November 5, 2018
RCP	Safe D	November 5, 2018
Daily Kos	Safe D	November 5, 2018
538	Safe D	November 7, 2018
CNN	Safe D	October 31, 2018
Politico	Safe D	November 4, 2018

==== Endorsements ====
David Price (D)

Labor unions

- AFL-CIO
- International Brotherhood of Boilermakers

Organizations

- Equality North Carolina
- Sierra Club

==== Results ====
North Carolina's 4th congressional district, 2018
Party	Candidate	Votes	%
Democratic	David Price (incumbent)	247,067	72.4
Republican	Steve Loor	82,052	24.0
Libertarian	Barbara Howe	12,284	3.6
Total votes		341,403	100.0
Democratic hold			

== District 5 ==
2018 North Carolina's 5th congressional district election
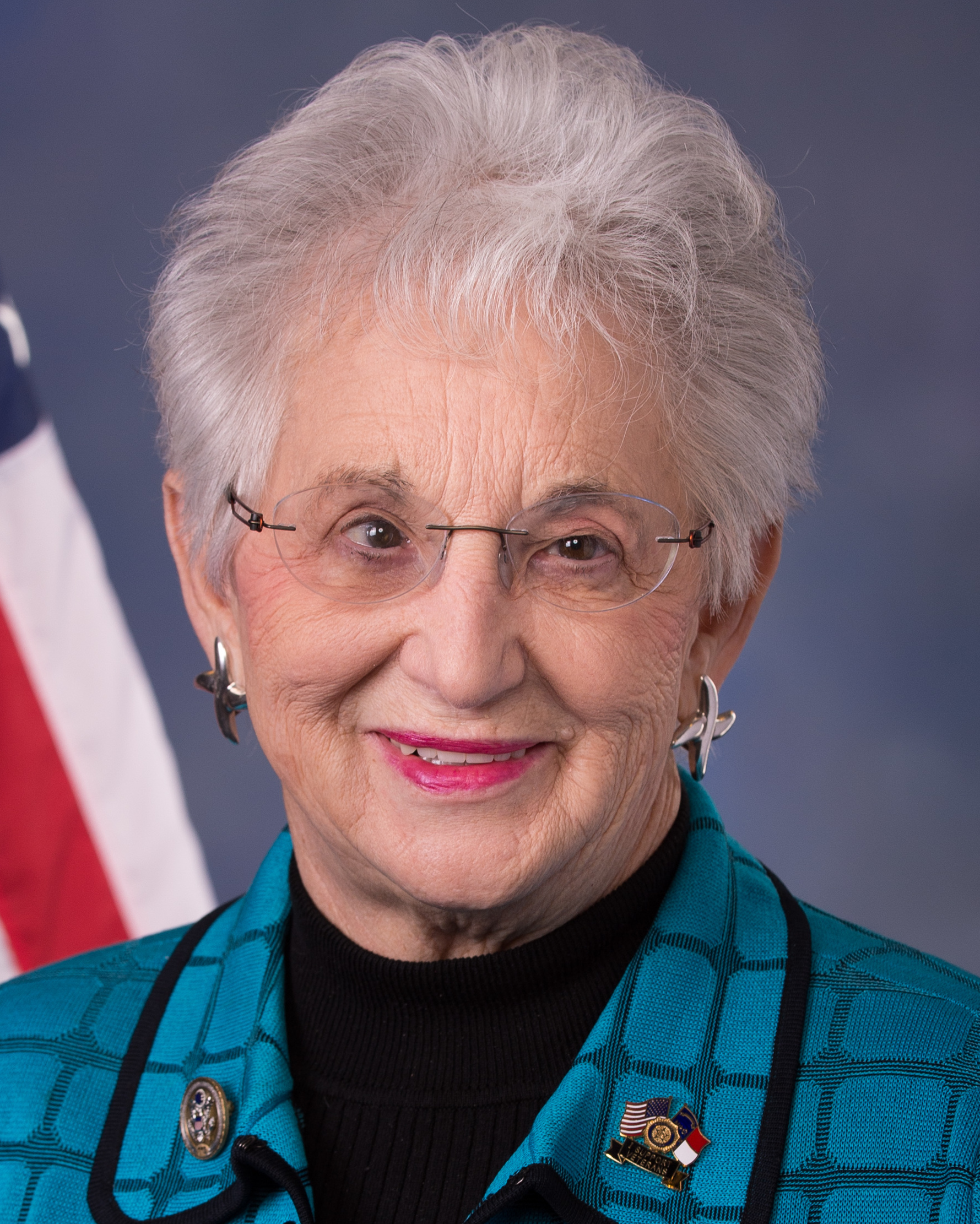

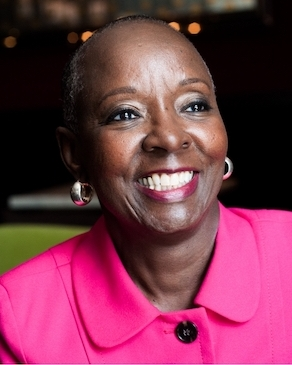
Nominee	Virginia Foxx	Denise D. Adams
Party	Republican	Democratic
Popular vote	159,917	120,468
Percentage	57.0%	43.0%
- County results Foxx: 60–70% 70–80% 80–90% Adams: 50–60%
U.S. Representative before election
Virginia Foxx
Republican
Elected U.S. Representative
Virginia Foxx
Republican

Incumbent Republican Virginia Foxx, who had represented the district since 2005, ran for re-election. She was re-elected with 58% of the vote in 2016. The district had a PVI of R+10.

=== Republican primary ===
==== Candidates ====
===== Nominee =====
- Virginia Foxx, incumbent U.S. representative

===== Eliminated in primary =====
- Dillon Gentry, salesman
- Cortland J. Meader, doctor
- Matthew Vera, high school coach

==== Primary results ====
Republican primary results
Party	Candidate	Votes	%
Republican	Virginia Foxx (incumbent)	32,654	80.8
Republican	Dillon Gentry	5,703	14.1
Republican	Cortland J. Meader	2,063	5.1
Total votes		40,420	100.0

=== Democratic primary ===
==== Candidates ====
===== Nominee =====
- Denise D. Adams, Winston-Salem city council member

===== Eliminated in primary =====
- Jenny Marshall, teacher

==== Endorsements ====
Jenny Marshall

Organizations

- Brand New Congress
- Justice Democrats

==== Primary results ====
Democratic primary results
Party	Candidate	Votes	%
Democratic	Denise D. Adams	15,509	54.4
Democratic	Jenny Marshall	12,987	45.6
Total votes		28,496	100.0

=== General election ===
==== Predictions ====
Source	Ranking	As of
The Cook Political Report	Safe R	November 5, 2018
Inside Elections	Safe R	November 5, 2018
Sabato's Crystal Ball	Safe R	November 5, 2018
RCP	Safe R	November 5, 2018
Daily Kos	Safe R	November 5, 2018
538	Safe R	November 7, 2018
CNN	Safe R	October 31, 2018
Politico	Safe R	November 4, 2018

==== Endorsements ====
Virginia Foxx (R)

Organizations

- Maggie's List
- Susan B. Anthony List
Denise D. Adams (D)

Labor unions

- AFL-CIO
- International Brotherhood of Boilermakers

Organizations

- Equality North Carolina
- MoveOn
- Sierra Club

==== Results ====
North Carolina's 5th congressional district, 2018
Party	Candidate	Votes	%
Republican	Virginia Foxx (incumbent)	159,917	57.0
Democratic	Denise D. Adams	120,468	43.0
Total votes		280,385	100.0
Republican hold			

== District 6 ==
2018 North Carolina's 6th congressional district election
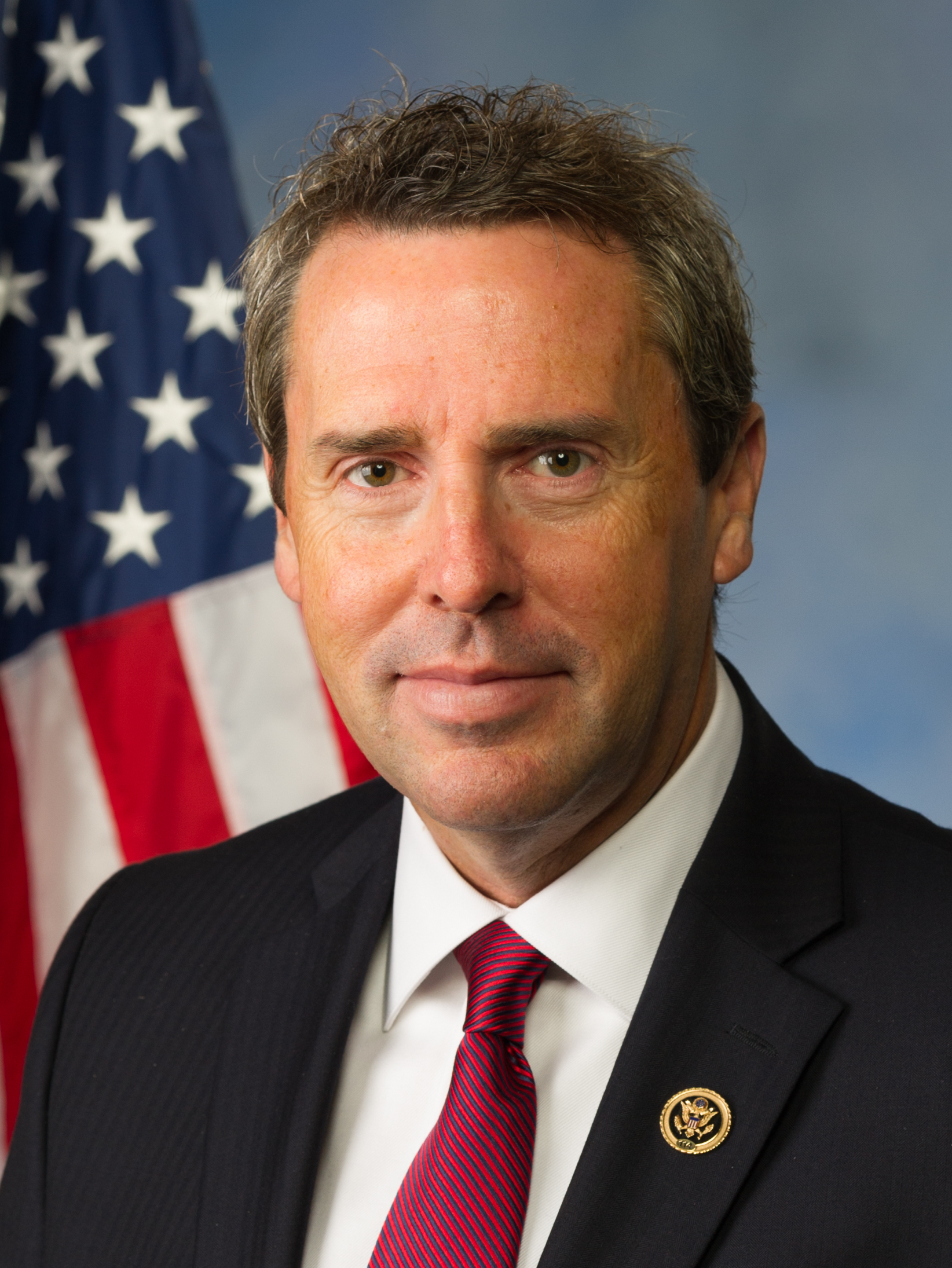

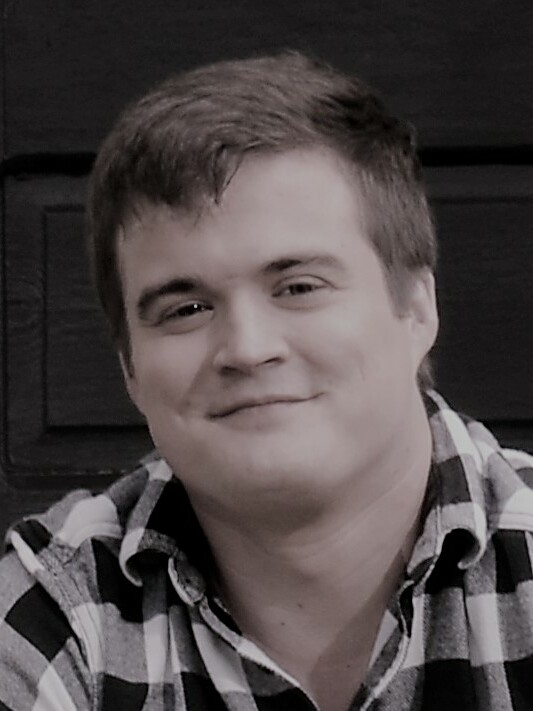
Nominee	Mark Walker	Ryan Watts
Party	Republican	Democratic
Popular vote	160,709	123,651
Percentage	56.5%	43.5%
- County results Walker: 50–60% 60–70% 70–80% Watts: 50–60%
U.S. Representative before election
Mark Walker
Republican
Elected U.S. Representative
Mark Walker
Republican

Incumbent Republican Mark Walker, who had represented the district since 2015, ran for re-election. He was re-elected with 59% of the vote in 2016. The district had a PVI of R+9.

=== Republican primary ===
==== Candidates ====
===== Nominee =====
- Mark Walker, incumbent U.S. representative

=== Democratic primary ===
==== Candidates ====
===== Nominee =====
- Ryan Watts, businessman

===== Eliminated in primary =====
- Gerald Wong, trucker

==== Endorsements ====
Ryan Watts

Organizations

- Equality North Carolina

==== Primary results ====
Democratic primary results
Party	Candidate	Votes	%
Democratic	Ryan Watts	26,072	77.2
Democratic	Gerald Wong	7,719	22.8
Total votes		33,791	100.0

=== General election ===
==== Endorsements ====
Ryan Watts (D)

State legislators

- Mike Woodard, state senator from the 22nd district (2013–present)

Organizations

- Equality North Carolina
- Indivisible

Individuals

- Laura Fjeld, attorney and nominee for this seat in 2014
- Phil Ford, former professional basketball player

==== Predictions ====
Source	Ranking	As of
The Cook Political Report	Safe R	November 5, 2018
Inside Elections	Safe R	November 5, 2018
Sabato's Crystal Ball	Safe R	November 5, 2018
RCP	Safe R	November 5, 2018
Daily Kos	Safe R	November 5, 2018
538	Likely R	November 7, 2018
CNN	Safe R	October 31, 2018
Politico	Safe R	November 4, 2018

==== Results ====
North Carolina's 6th congressional district, 2018
Party	Candidate	Votes	%
Republican	Mark Walker (incumbent)	160,709	56.5
Democratic	Ryan Watts	123,651	43.5
Total votes		284,360	100.0
Republican hold			

== District 7 ==
2018 North Carolina's 7th congressional district election
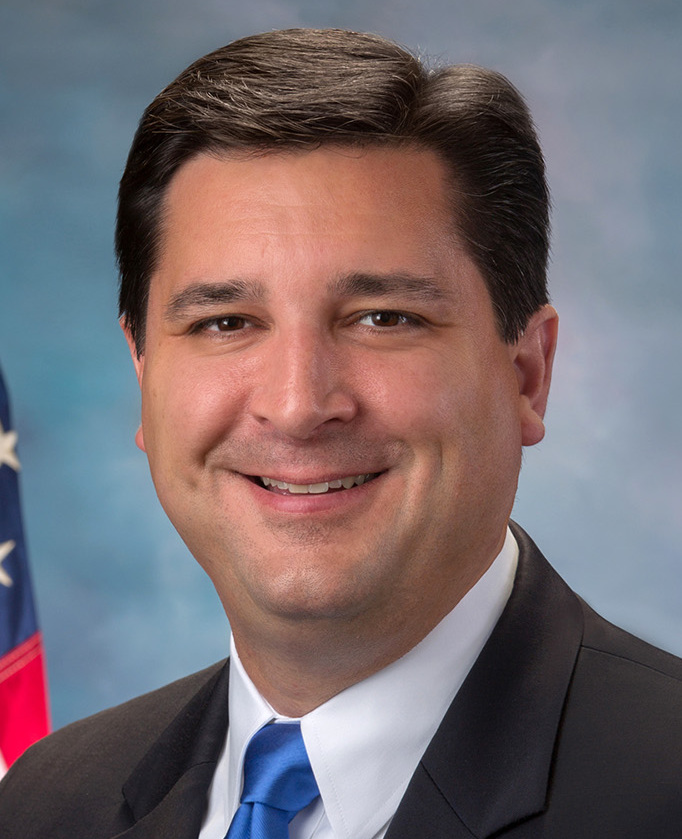

Nominee	David Rouzer	Kyle Horton
Party	Republican	Democratic
Popular vote	156,809	120,838
Percentage	55.5%	42.8%
- County results Rouzer: 50–60% 70–80% Horton: 50–60% 60–70%
U.S. Representative before election
David Rouzer
Republican
Elected U.S. Representative
David Rouzer
Republican

Incumbent Republican David Rouzer, who had represented the district since 2015, ran for re-election. He was re-elected with 61% of the vote in 2016. The district had a PVI of R+9.

=== Republican primary ===
==== Candidates ====
===== Nominee =====
- David Rouzer, incumbent U.S. representative

=== Democratic primary ===
==== Candidates ====
===== Nominee =====
- Kyle Horton, physician

===== Eliminated in primary =====
- Grayson Parker, consultant

==== Primary results ====
Democratic primary results
Party	Candidate	Votes	%
Democratic	Kyle Horton	21,499	67.0
Democratic	Grayson Parker	10,587	33.0
Total votes		32,086	100.0

=== General election ===
==== Endorsements ====
Kyle Horton (D)

Labor unions

- AFL-CIO
- Communications Workers of America
- International Brotherhood of Boilermakers

Organizations

- End Citizens United
- Equality North Carolina
- MoveOn
- Sierra Club

==== Polling ====
Poll source	Date(s) administered	Sample size	Margin of error	David Rouzer (R)	Kyle Horton (D)	Other	Undecided
Lincoln Park Strategies (D-Horton)	August 18–22, 2018	500	± 4.4%	38%	40%	3%	19%

==== Predictions ====
Source	Ranking	As of
The Cook Political Report	Safe R	November 5, 2018
Inside Elections	Safe R	November 5, 2018
Sabato's Crystal Ball	Safe R	November 5, 2018
RCP	Safe R	November 5, 2018
Daily Kos	Safe R	November 5, 2018
538	Likely R	November 7, 2018
CNN	Safe R	October 31, 2018
Politico	Safe R	November 4, 2018

==== Results ====
North Carolina's 7th congressional district, 2018
Party	Candidate	Votes	%
Republican	David Rouzer (incumbent)	156,809	55.5
Democratic	Kyle Horton	120,838	42.8
Constitution	David Fallin	4,665	1.7
Total votes		282,312	100.0
Republican hold			

== District 8 ==
2018 North Carolina's 8th congressional district election
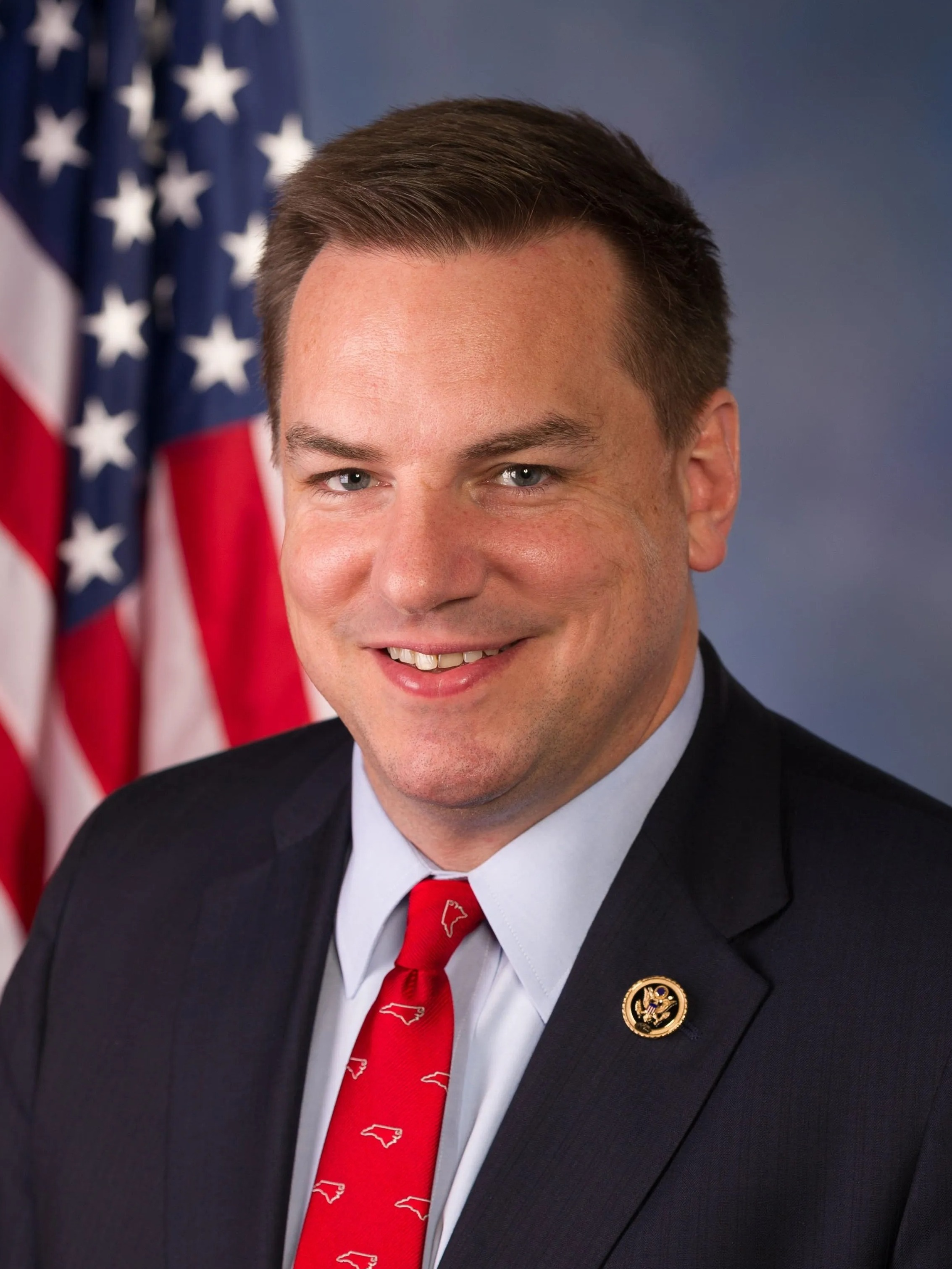

Nominee	Richard Hudson	Frank McNeill
Party	Republican	Democratic
Popular vote	141,402	114,119
Percentage	55.3%	44.7%
- County results Hudson: 50–60% 60–70% 70–80% Mcneill: 60–70%
U.S. Representative before election
Richard Hudson
Republican
Elected U.S. Representative
Richard Hudson
Republican

Incumbent Republican Richard Hudson, who had represented the district since 2013, ran for re-election. He was re-elected with 59% of the vote in 2016. The district had a PVI of R+8.

=== Republican primary ===
==== Candidates ====
===== Nominee =====
- Richard Hudson, incumbent U.S. representative

=== Democratic primary ===
The Democratic Congressional Campaign Committee included North Carolina's 8th congressional district on its initial list of Republican-held seats considered targets in 2018.

==== Candidates ====
===== Nominee =====
- Frank McNeill, former mayor of Aberdeen

===== Eliminated in primary =====
- Scott Huffman, small business owner
- Marc Tiegel, businessman

==== Endorsements ====
Marc Tiegel

Organizations

- Equality North Carolina

==== Primary results ====
Democratic primary results
Party	Candidate	Votes	%
Democratic	Frank McNeill	16,019	56.0
Democratic	Scott Huffman	6,581	23.0
Democratic	Marc Tiegel	5,997	21.0
Total votes		28,597	100.0

=== General election ===
==== Endorsements ====
Frank McNeill (D)

Labor unions

- AFL-CIO
- International Brotherhood of Boilermakers

Organizations

- Blue Dog Coalition
- End Citizens United
- Equality North Carolina
- MoveOn

==== Predictions ====
Source	Ranking	As of
The Cook Political Report	Likely R	November 5, 2018
Inside Elections	Safe R	November 5, 2018
Sabato's Crystal Ball	Likely R	November 5, 2018
RCP	Likely R	November 5, 2018
Daily Kos	Safe R	November 5, 2018
538	Likely R	November 7, 2018
CNN	Safe R	October 31, 2018
Politico	Safe R	November 4, 2018

==== Results ====
North Carolina's 8th congressional district, 2018
Party	Candidate	Votes	%
Republican	Richard Hudson (incumbent)	141,402	55.3
Democratic	Frank McNeill	114,119	44.7
Total votes		255,521	100.0
Republican hold			

== District 9 ==
2018 North Carolina's 9th congressional district election
- November 6, 2018
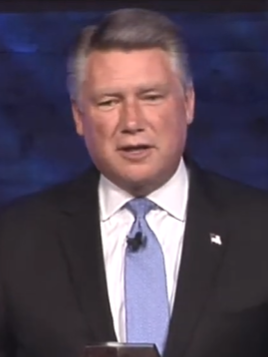

Candidate	Mark Harris	Dan McCready
Party	Republican	Democratic
Popular vote	139,246	138,341
Percentage	49.3%	48.9%
U.S. Representative before election
Robert Pittenger
Republican
Elected U.S. Representative
Election results annulled

Incumbent Robert Pittenger, who had represented the district since 2013, ran for re-election. He was re-elected with 58% of the vote in 2016. The district had a PVI of R+8.

The results of the election were voided, and the seat remained vacant until a special election was held in 2019.

=== Republican primary ===
==== Candidates ====
===== Nominee =====
- Mark Harris, pastor

===== Eliminated in primary =====
- Clarence Goins, banker
- Robert Pittenger, incumbent U.S. representative

==== Endorsements ====
Robert Pittenger

Organizations

- BIPAC

==== Primary results ====
The incumbent, Pittenger, lost his party's nomination to Mark Harris.

Republican primary results
Party	Candidate	Votes	%
Republican	Mark Harris	17,302	48.5
Republican	Robert Pittenger (incumbent)	16,474	46.2
Republican	Clarence Goins	1,867	5.2
Total votes		35,643	100.0

=== Democratic primary ===
==== Candidates ====
===== Nominee =====
- Dan McCready, entrepreneur and U.S. Marine Iraq war veteran

==== Eliminated in primary ====
- Christian Cano, hotel manager & hospitality consultant and nominee for this district in 2016

==== Primary results ====
Democratic primary results
Party	Candidate	Votes	%
Democratic	Dan McCready	38,098	82.8
Democratic	Christian Cano	7,922	17.2
Total votes		46,020	100.0

=== Libertarian primary ===
==== Candidates ====
===== Nominee =====
- Jeff Scott

=== General election ===
==== Endorsements ====
Mark Harris (R)

U.S. executive branch officials

- Donald Trump, president of the United States

Organizations

- House Freedom Caucus
- National Republican Congressional Committee "Young Guns" Program
Dan McCready (D)

Statewide officials

- Jim Hunt, former governor of North Carolina (1977–1985 & 1993–2001)
- Robert F. Orr (R), associate justice of the North Carolina Supreme Court (1995–2004)

State legislators

- Becky Carney, state representative (2003–present)
- Ken Goodman, state representative (2011–present)
- Charles Graham, state representative (2011–present)
- Jeff Jackson, state senator from the 14th district (2014–present)
- Gene McLaurin, state senator from the 25th district (2011–2013)
- Garland Pierce, state representative (2005–present)

Labor unions

- AFL-CIO
- International Brotherhood of Boilermakers

Organizations

- Blue Dog Coalition
- Climate Hawks Vote
- Democratic Congressional Campaign Committee "Red to Blue" Program
- End Citizens United
- Equality North Carolina
- League of Conservation Voters Action Fund
- New Democrat Coalition
- New Politics
- Sierra Club
- VoteVets
- With Honor Fund

Individuals

- Hugh McColl, former chairman and CEO of Bank of America
Jeff Scott (L)

Individuals

- Christian Cano, Democratic nominee for this seat in 2016

==== Debates ====
- Complete video of debate, October 10, 2018

==== Polling ====
Poll source	Date(s) administered	Sample size	Margin of error	Mark Harris (R)	Dan McCready (D)	Jeff Scott (L)	Undecided
NYT Upshot/Siena College	October 26–30, 2018	505	± 5.0%	45%	44%	3%	7%
NYT Upshot/Siena College	October 1–5, 2018	502	± 4.9%	47%	42%	—	11%
SurveyUSA	October 2–4, 2018	556	± 4.7%	41%	45%	3%	12%
SurveyUSA	July 5–8, 2018	600	± 4.6%	36%	43%	3%	19%
ALG Research (D)	March 8–13, 2018	500	± 4.4%	43%	44%	—	13%

Hypothetical polling

Poll source	Date(s) administered	Sample size	Margin of error	Robert Pittenger (R)	Dan McCready (D)	Undecided
Public Policy Polling (D)	April 16–17, 2018	662	±3.8%	42%	37%	21%

==== Predictions ====
Source	Ranking	As of
The Cook Political Report	Tossup	November 5, 2018
Inside Elections	Tossup	November 5, 2018
Sabato's Crystal Ball	Lean D (flip)	November 5, 2018
RCP	Tossup	November 5, 2018
Daily Kos	Tossup	November 5, 2018
538	Tossup	November 7, 2018
CNN	Tossup	October 31, 2018
Politico	Tossup	November 4, 2018

==== Results ====
North Carolina's 9th congressional district, 2018
Party	Candidate	Votes	%
Republican	Mark Harris	139,246	49.25
Democratic	Dan McCready	138,341	48.93
Libertarian	Jeff Scott	5,130	1.81
Total votes		282,717	100.0

On November 27, 2018, the State Board of Elections declined to certify the election result in this congressional district, while certifying all the others, pending investigation of unspecified "potential wrongdoing". An investigation was opened focusing on McCrae Dowless, a political operative who was hired by the Harris campaign for get-out-the-vote work, and allegations of irregularities involving the collection of absentee ballots. On December 28, 2018, incoming House Majority Leader Steny Hoyer stated House Democrats' official position of declining to seat Harris on January 3. A new election was called.

== District 10 ==
2018 North Carolina's 10th congressional district election
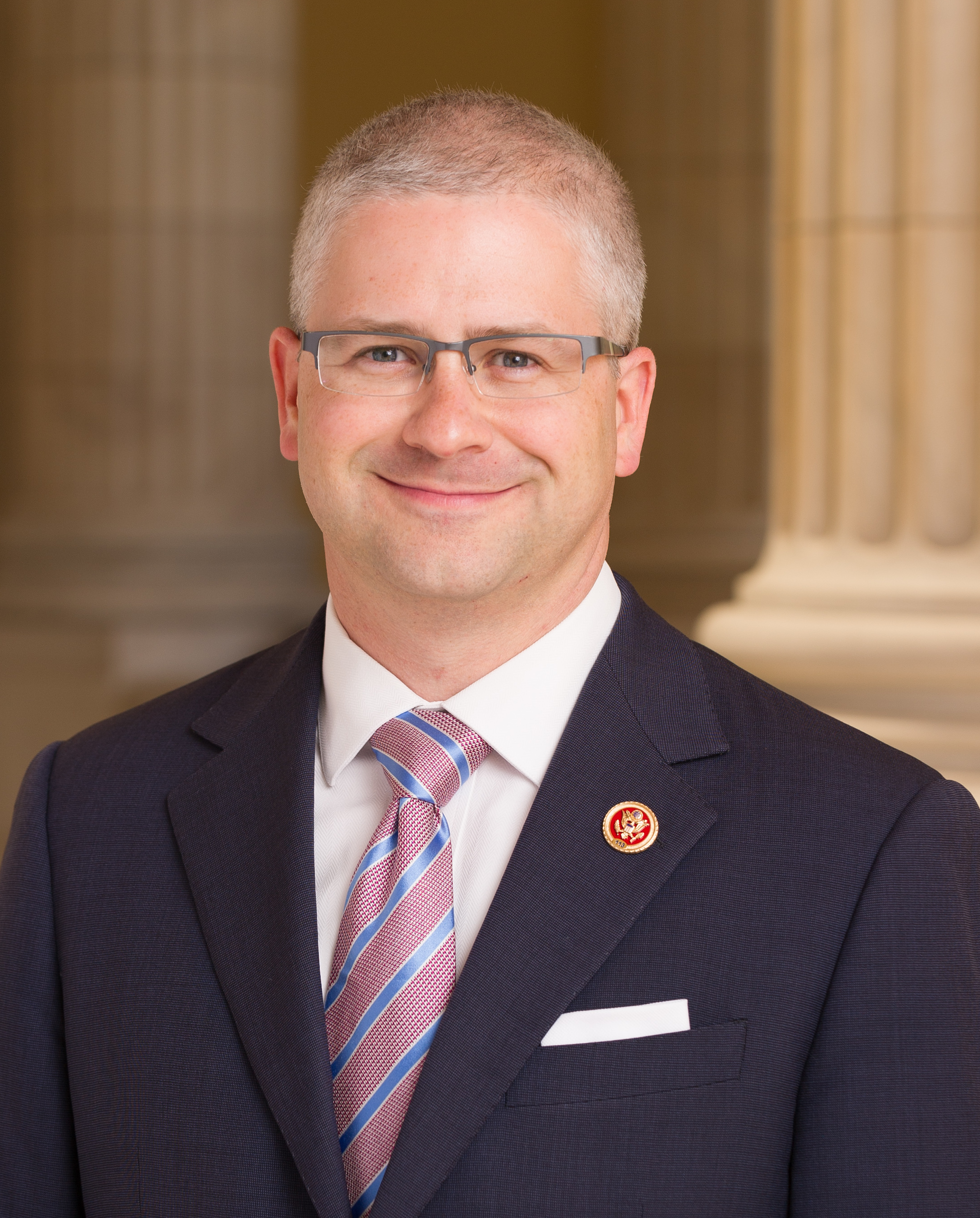

Nominee	Patrick McHenry	David Brown
Party	Republican	Democratic
Popular vote	164,969	113,259
Percentage	59.3%	40.7%
- County results Mchenry: 50–60% 60–70% 70–80% Brown: 60–70%
U.S. Representative before election
Patrick McHenry
Republican
Elected U.S. Representative
Patrick McHenry
Republican

Incumbent Republican Patrick McHenry, who had represented the district since 2005, ran for re-election. He was re-elected with 63% of the vote in 2016. The district had a PVI of R+12.

=== Republican primary ===
==== Candidates ====
===== Nominee =====
- Patrick McHenry, incumbent U.S. representative

===== Eliminated in primary =====
- Seth Blankenship
- Gina Collias, attorney
- Jeff Gregory, postmaster and candidate for this seat in 2016
- Ira Roberts, former intelligence officer for the Army National Guard
- Albert Wiley, Jr., physician & professor and candidate for this seat in 2016

==== Primary results ====
Republican primary results
Party	Candidate	Votes	%
Republican	Patrick McHenry (incumbent)	34,173	70.7
Republican	Gina Collias	6,664	13.8
Republican	Jeff Gregory	3,724	7.7
Republican	Ira Roberts	1,701	3.5
Republican	Seth Blankenship	1,443	3.0
Republican	Albert Wiley, Jr.	616	1.3
Total votes		48,321	100.0

=== Democratic primary ===
==== Candidates ====
===== Nominee =====
- David Wilson Brown, IT consultant

=== General election ===
==== Predictions ====
Source	Ranking	As of
The Cook Political Report	Safe R	November 5, 2018
Inside Elections	Safe R	November 5, 2018
Sabato's Crystal Ball	Safe R	November 5, 2018
RCP	Safe R	November 5, 2018
Daily Kos	Safe R	November 5, 2018
538	Safe R	November 7, 2018
CNN	Safe R	October 31, 2018
Politico	Safe R	November 4, 2018

==== Endorsements ====
David Brown (D)

Labor unions

- AFL-CIO
- International Brotherhood of Boilermakers

Organizations

- Equality North Carolina

==== Results ====
North Carolina's 10th congressional district, 2018
Party	Candidate	Votes	%
Republican	Patrick McHenry (incumbent)	164,969	59.3
Democratic	David Wilson Brown	113,259	40.7
Total votes		278,228	100.0
Republican hold			

== District 11 ==
2018 North Carolina's 11th congressional district election
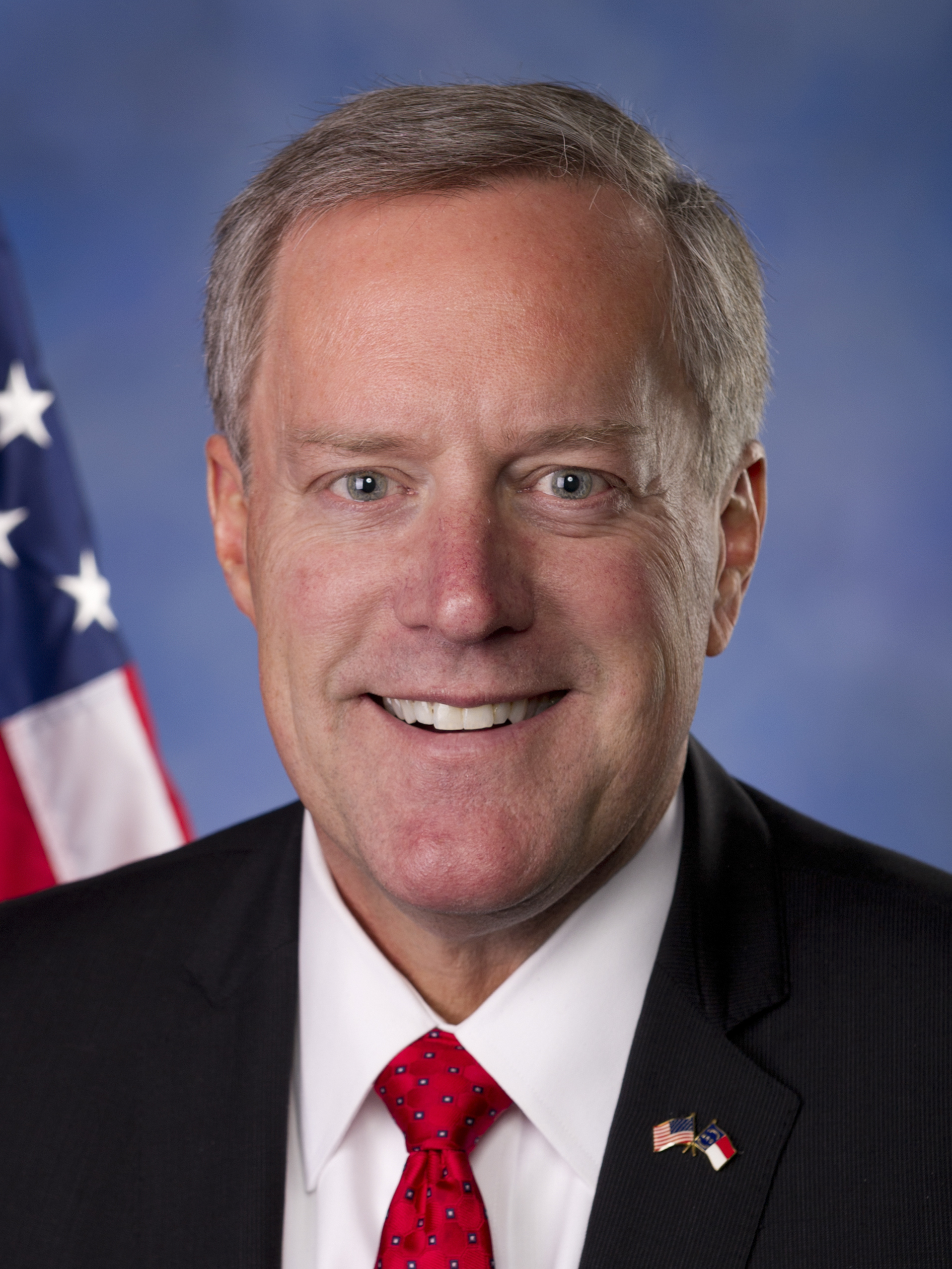

Nominee	Mark Meadows	Phillip Price
Party	Republican	Democratic
Popular vote	178,012	116,508
Percentage	59.2%	38.8%
- County results Meadows: 40–50% 50–60% 60–70% 70–80% Price: 50–60%
U.S. Representative before election
Mark Meadows
Republican
Elected U.S. Representative
Mark Meadows
Republican

Incumbent Mark Meadows, who had represented the district since 2013, ran for re-election. He was re-elected with 64% of the vote in 2016. The district had a PVI of R+14.

=== Republican primary ===
==== Candidates ====
===== Nominee =====
- Mark Meadows, incumbent U.S. representative

===== Eliminated in primary =====
- Chuck Archerd

==== Primary results ====
Republican primary results
Party	Candidate	Votes	%
Republican	Mark Meadows (incumbent)	35,665	86.4
Republican	Chuck Archerd	5,639	13.6
Total votes		41,304	100.0

=== Democratic primary ===
==== Candidates ====
===== Nominee =====
- Phillip Price, business owner

===== Eliminated in primary =====
- Scott Donaldson, urologist
- Steve Woodsmall, former U.S. Air Force officer

==== Endorsements ====
Steve Woodsmall

Organizations

- Equality North Carolina

==== Primary results ====
Democratic primary results
Party	Candidate	Votes	%
Democratic	Phillip Price	13,499	40.6
Democratic	Steve Woodsmall	10,356	31.1
Democratic	Scott Donaldson	9,402	28.3
Total votes		33,257	100.0

=== Libertarian primary ===
==== Candidates ====
===== Nominee =====
- Clifton Ingram

=== General election ===
==== Predictions ====
Source	Ranking	As of
The Cook Political Report	Safe R	November 5, 2018
Inside Elections	Safe R	November 5, 2018
Sabato's Crystal Ball	Safe R	November 5, 2018
RCP	Safe R	November 5, 2018
Daily Kos	Safe R	November 5, 2018
538	Safe R	November 7, 2018
CNN	Safe R	October 31, 2018
Politico	Safe R	November 4, 2018

==== Endorsements ====
Mark Meadows (R)

Organizations

- Eagle Forum
Phillip Price (D)

Labor unions

- AFL-CIO
- International Brotherhood of Boilermakers

Organizations

- Equality North Carolina
- Indivisible

==== Results ====
North Carolina's 11th congressional district, 2018
Party	Candidate	Votes	%
Republican	Mark Meadows (incumbent)	178,012	59.2
Democratic	Phillip Price	116,508	38.8
Libertarian	Clifton Ingram	6,146	2.0
Total votes		300,666	100.0
Republican hold			

== District 12 ==
2018 North Carolina's 12th congressional district election
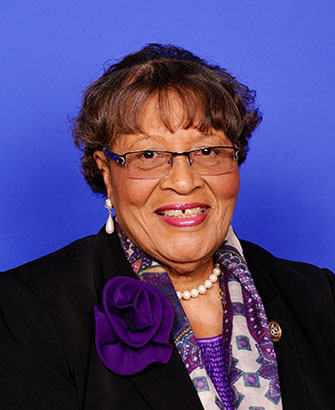

Nominee	Alma Adams	Paul Wright
Party	Democratic	Republican
Popular vote	203,974	75,164
Percentage	73.1%	26.9%
- County results Adams: 70–80%
U.S. Representative before election
Alma Adams
Democratic
Elected U.S. Representative
Alma Adams
Democratic

Incumbent Democrat Alma Adams, who had represented the district since 2014, ran for re-election. She was re-elected with 67% of the vote in 2016. The district had a PVI of D+18.

=== Democratic primary ===
==== Candidates ====
===== Nominee =====
- Alma Adams, incumbent U.S. representative

===== Eliminated in primary =====
- Gabe Ortiz
- Patrick Register, food service worker
- Keith Young, Asheville city councilman

==== Endorsements ====
Alma Adams

Organizations

- Equality North Carolina

==== Primary results ====
Democratic primary results
Party	Candidate	Votes	%
Democratic	Alma Adams (incumbent)	38,849	85.5
Democratic	Keith Young	2,549	5.6
Democratic	Patrick Register	2,074	4.6
Democratic	Gabe Ortiz	1,959	4.3
Total votes		45,431	100.0

=== Republican primary ===
==== Candidates ====
===== Nominee =====
- Paul Wright, attorney, former District Court & Superior Court judge, candidate for governor in 2012, nominee for the 4th district in 2014, candidate for U.S. Senate in 2016 and candidate for this seat in 2016

===== Eliminated in primary =====
- Paul Bonham, teacher and solar consultant
- Carl Persson

==== Primary results ====
Republican primary results
Party	Candidate	Votes	%
Republican	Paul Wright	3,221	43.2
Republican	Paul Bonham	2,349	31.5
Republican	Carl Persson	1,885	25.3
Total votes		7,455	100.0

=== General election ===
==== Predictions ====
Source	Ranking	As of
The Cook Political Report	Safe D	November 5, 2018
Inside Elections	Safe D	November 5, 2018
Sabato's Crystal Ball	Safe D	November 5, 2018
RCP	Safe D	November 5, 2018
Daily Kos	Safe D	November 5, 2018
538	Safe D	November 7, 2018
CNN	Safe D	October 31, 2018
Politico	Safe D	November 4, 2018

==== Endorsements ====
Alma Adams (D)

Labor unions

- AFL-CIO
- International Brotherhood of Boilermakers

Organizations

- Congressional Progressive Caucus
- EMILY's List
- Equality North Carolina
- Sierra Club

==== Results ====
North Carolina's 12th congressional district, 2018
Party	Candidate	Votes	%
Democratic	Alma Adams (incumbent)	203,974	73.1
Republican	Paul Wright	75,164	26.9
Total votes		279,138	100.0
Democratic hold			

== District 13 ==
2018 North Carolina's 13th congressional district election
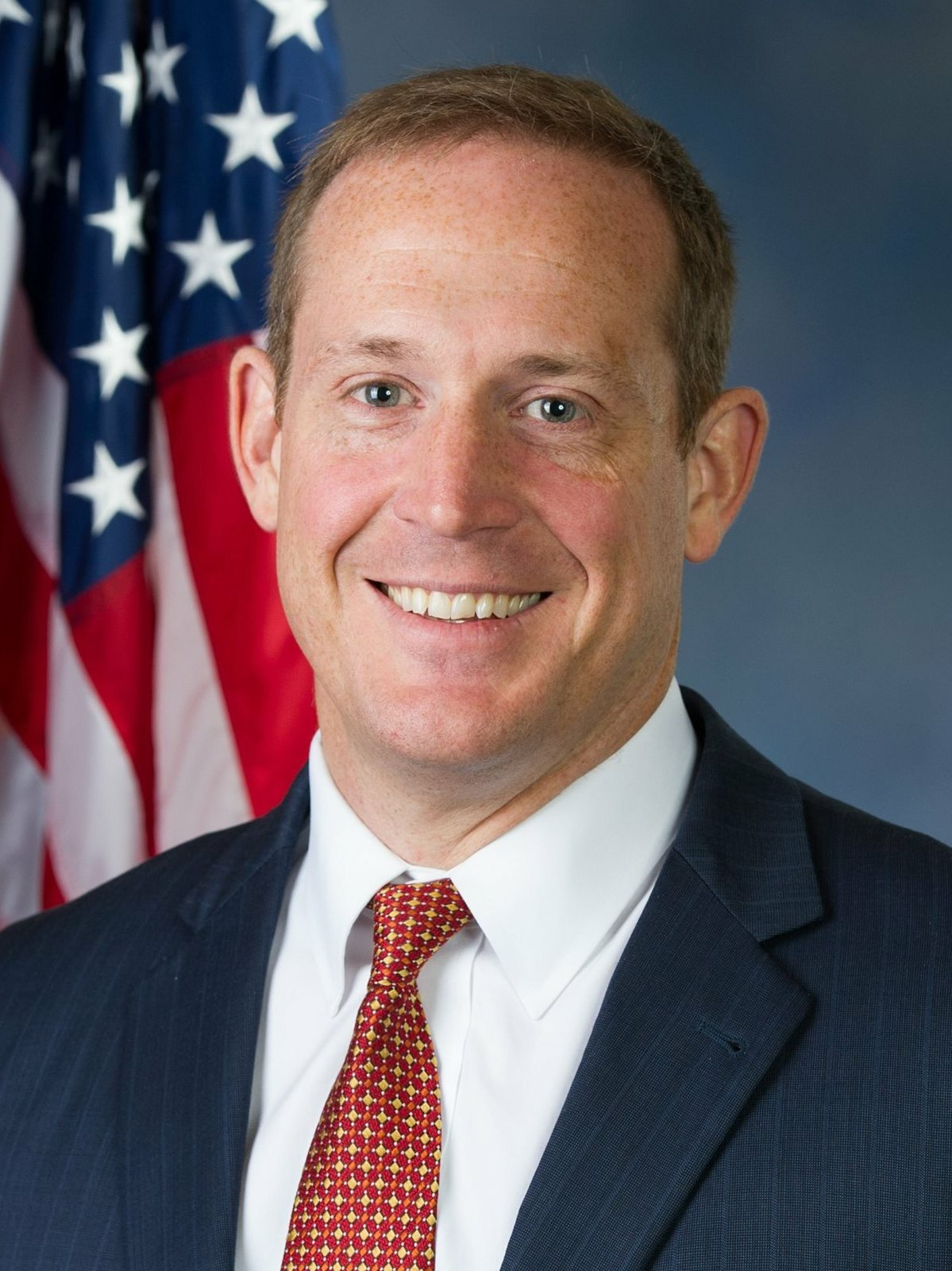

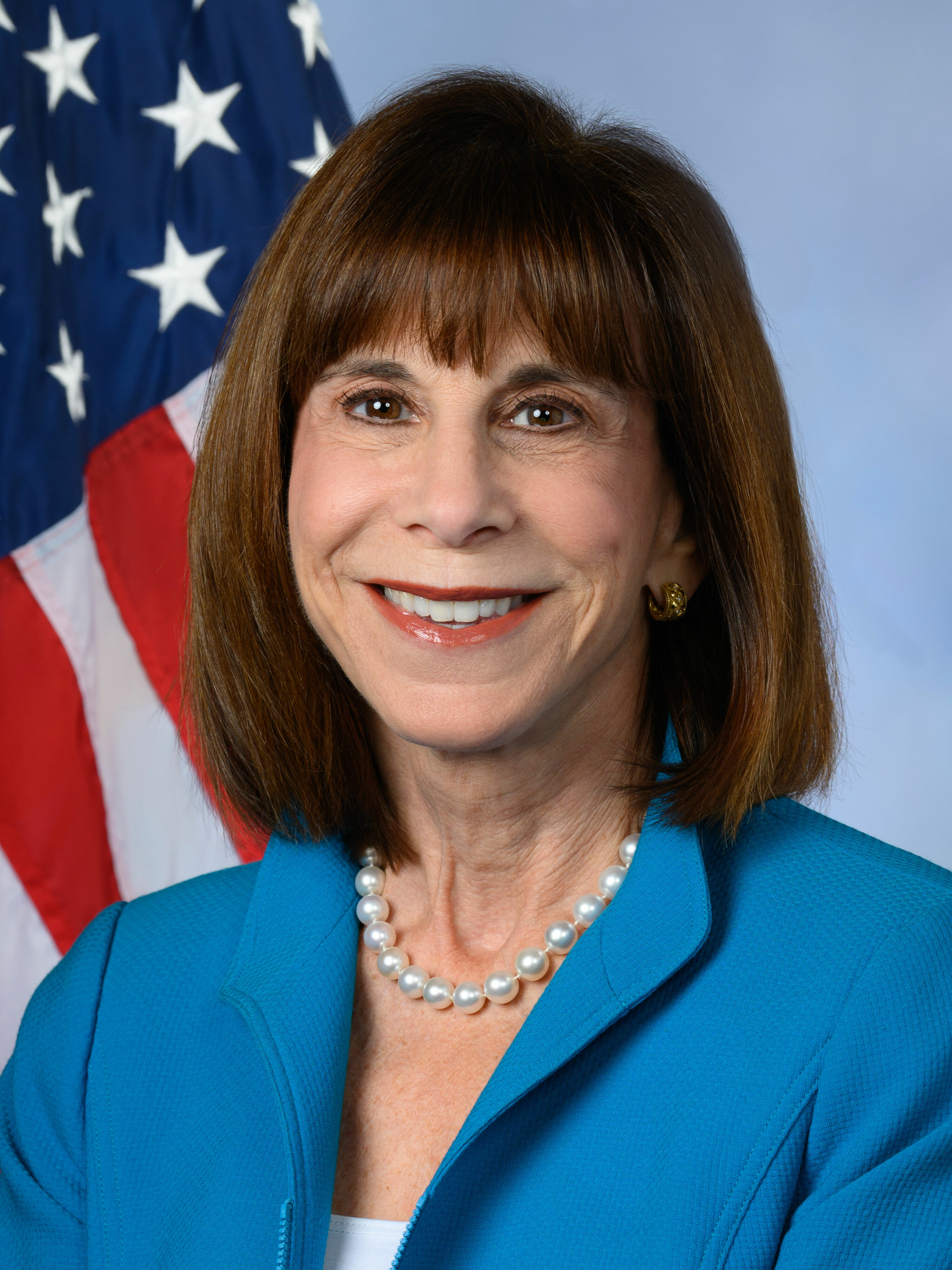
Nominee	Ted Budd	Kathy Manning
Party	Republican	Democratic
Popular vote	147,570	130,402
Percentage	51.5%	45.6%
- County results Budd: 40–50% 60–70% 70–80% Manning: 60–70%
U.S. Representative before election
Ted Budd
Republican
Elected U.S. Representative
Ted Budd
Republican

Incumbent Republican Ted Budd, who had represented the district since 2017, ran for re-election. He was elected with 56% of the vote in 2016. The district had a PVI of R+6.

=== Republican primary ===
==== Candidates ====
===== Nominee =====
- Ted Budd, incumbent U.S. representative

=== Democratic primary ===
==== Candidates ====
===== Nominee =====
- Kathy Manning, attorney

===== Eliminated in primary =====
- Adam Coker, trucker

==== Endorsements ====
Kathy Manning

Organizations

- Equality North Carolina

==== Primary results ====
Democratic primary results
Party	Candidate	Votes	%
Democratic	Kathy Manning	19,554	70.1
Democratic	Adam Coker	8,324	29.9
Total votes		27,878	100.0

=== Libertarian primary ===
==== Candidates ====
===== Nominee =====
- Tom Bailey

=== General election ===
==== Endorsements ====
Ted Budd (R)

Executive branch officials

- Donald Trump, president of the United States

Organizations

- Club for Growth
- Susan B. Anthony List
Kathy Manning (D)

Labor unions

- AFL-CIO
- Communications Workers of America
- International Brotherhood of Boilermakers

Organizations

- Blue Dog Coalition
- Democratic Congressional Campaign Committee "Red to Blue" Program
- EMILY's List
- End Citizens United
- Equality North Carolina
- League of Conservation Voters Action Fund
- New Democrat Coalition

==== Polling ====
Poll source	Date(s) administered	Sample size	Margin of error	Ted Budd (R)	Kathy Manning (D)	Other	Undecided
Change Research (D)	November 2–4, 2018	567	–	43%	43%	3%	12%
SurveyUSA	October 9–12, 2018	533	± 5.2%	44%	41%	2%	13%
NYT Upshot/Siena College	October 3–8, 2018	500	± 4.9%	47%	41%	–	12%
DCCC (D)	September 13, 2018	537	± 4.2%	42%	46%	–	–
SurveyUSA	July 12–16, 2018	537	± 4.7%	40%	35%	6%	19%
Public Policy Polling (D)	April 16–17, 2018	668	± 3.8%	43%	40%	–	17%

==== Predictions ====
Source	Ranking	As of
The Cook Political Report	Tossup	November 5, 2018
Inside Elections	Tilt R	November 5, 2018
Sabato's Crystal Ball	Lean R	November 5, 2018
RCP	Lean R	November 5, 2018
Daily Kos	Lean R	November 5, 2018
538	Lean R	November 7, 2018
CNN	Lean R	October 31, 2018
Politico	Lean R	November 4, 2018

==== Results ====
North Carolina's 13th congressional district, 2018
Party	Candidate	Votes	%
Republican	Ted Budd (incumbent)	147,570	51.5
Democratic	Kathy Manning	130,402	45.6
Libertarian	Tom Bailey	5,513	1.9
Green	Robert Corriher	2,831	1.0
Total votes		286,316	100.0
Republican hold			
