= Darren Jackson (politician) =

American politician from North Carolina

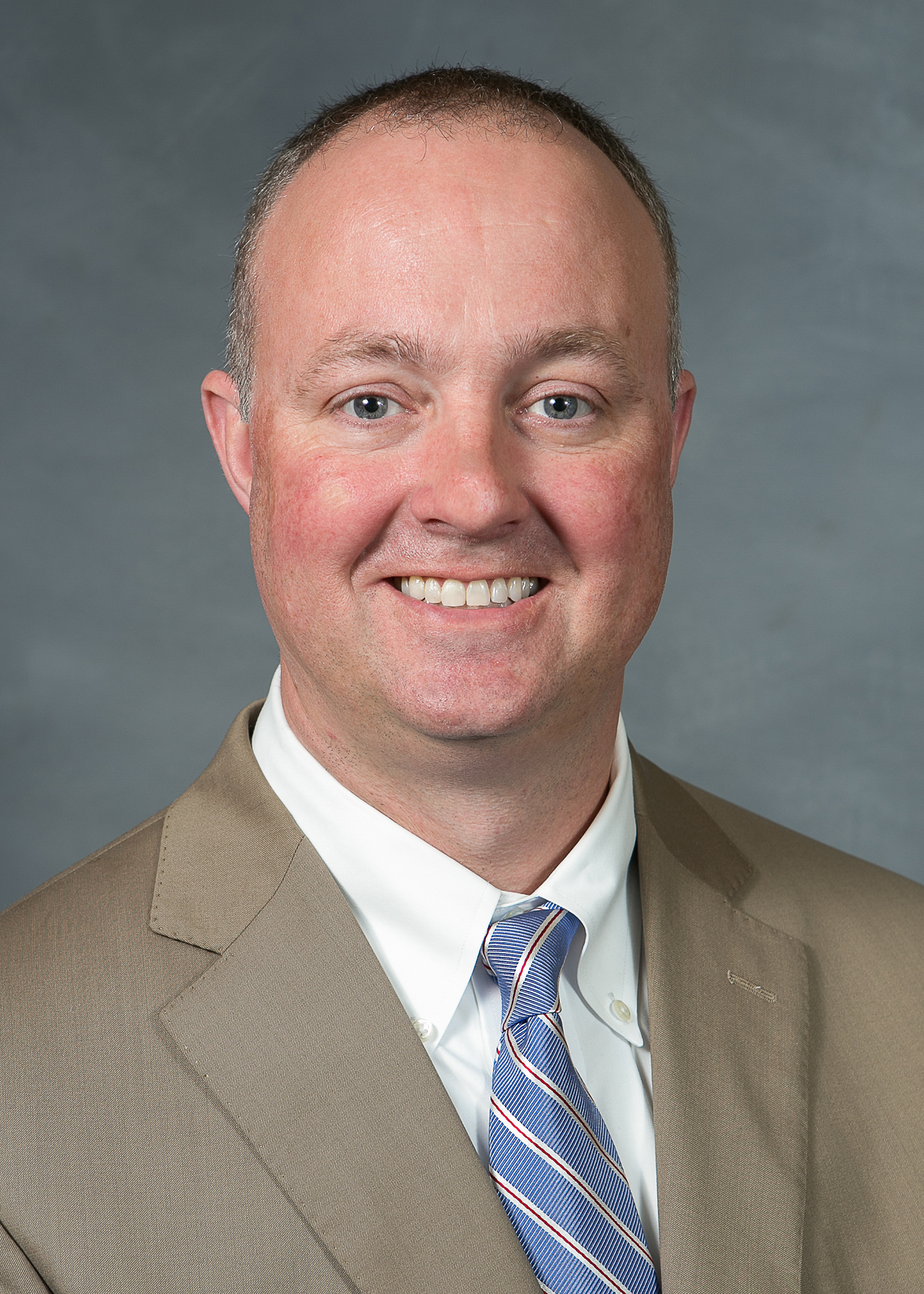

Judge of the North Carolina Court of Appeals
- In office January 6, 2021 – December 31, 2022
- Appointed by: Roy Cooper
- Preceded by: Phil Berger Jr.
- Succeeded by: Michael Stading

Minority Leader of the North Carolina House of Representatives
- In office January 11, 2017 – December 30, 2020
- Deputy: Robert Reives
- Preceded by: Larry Hall
- Succeeded by: Robert Reives

Member of the North Carolina House of Representatives from the 39th district
- In office January 26, 2009 – December 30, 2020
- Preceded by: Linda Coleman
- Succeeded by: James Roberson

Personal details
- Born: June 29, 1970 (age 56) Wake County, North Carolina, U.S.
- Party: Democratic
- Spouse: Tina
- Education: University of North Carolina, Chapel Hill (BA); Duke University (JD)

Darren G. Jackson (born June 29, 1970) is an American attorney and politician, who served for two years as a judge of the North Carolina Court of Appeals.

Jackson served as a Democratic member of the North Carolina House of Representatives from 2009 through 2020, representing part of Wake County, North Carolina. While in the legislature, Jackson was also an attorney with Gay, Jackson & McNally, LLP.

Jackson was elected House Minority (Democratic) Leader just before the beginning of the 2017-18 session of the North Carolina General Assembly. He announced that he would not seek another term as minority leader after the 2020 legislative elections.

On Dec. 30, 2020, Jackson resigned from the House of Representatives to accept an appointment from North Carolina Governor Roy Cooper to serve on the North Carolina Court of Appeals. He filled the vacancy created by Judge Phil Berger Jr.'s election to the state supreme court. He sought election to a full term in 2022, but was defeated.

In 2023, Governor Cooper appointed Jackson to a seat on the North Carolina Post-Release Supervision & Parole Commission.

== Electoral history ==
=== 2020 ===
North Carolina House of Representatives 39th district general election, 2020
Party	Candidate	Votes	%
Democratic	Darren Jackson (incumbent)	41,783	100%
Total votes		41,783	100%
Democratic hold			

=== 2018 ===
North Carolina House of Representatives 39th district general election, 2018
Party	Candidate	Votes	%
Democratic	Darren Jackson (incumbent)	24,172	66.40%
Republican	Rhonda Allen	11,441	31.43%
Libertarian	Martin Mazuldowski	789	2.17%
Total votes		36,402	100%
Democratic hold			

=== 2016 ===
North Carolina House of Representatives 39th district general election, 2016
Party	Candidate	Votes	%
Democratic	Darren Jackson (incumbent)	31,901	100%
Total votes		31,901	100%
Democratic hold			

=== 2014 ===
North Carolina House of Representatives 39th district general election, 2014
Party	Candidate	Votes	%
Democratic	Darren Jackson (incumbent)	18,823	100%
Total votes		18,823	100%
Democratic hold			

=== 2012 ===
North Carolina House of Representatives 39th district Democratic primary election, 2012
Party	Candidate	Votes	%
Democratic	Darren Jackson (incumbent)	5,879	60.98%
Democratic	Don Mial	2,846	29.52%
Democratic	Michael Slawter	916	9.50%
Total votes		9,641	100%

North Carolina House of Representatives 39th district general election, 2012
Party	Candidate	Votes	%
Democratic	Darren Jackson (incumbent)	27,585	100%
Total votes		27,585	100%
Democratic hold			

=== 2010 ===
North Carolina House of Representatives 39th district Democratic primary election, 2010
Party	Candidate	Votes	%
Democratic	Darren Jackson (incumbent)	2,175	60.72%
Democratic	Jeanne Milliken Bonds	1,407	39.28%
Total votes		3,582	100%

North Carolina House of Representatives 39th district general election, 2010
Party	Candidate	Votes	%
Democratic	Darren Jackson (incumbent)	16,870	56.84%
Republican	Duane Cutlip	12,809	43.16%
Total votes		29,679	100%
Democratic hold			

=== 2004 ===
North Carolina House of Representatives 39th district Democratic primary election, 2004
Party	Candidate	Votes	%
Democratic	Linda Coleman	2,242	60.43%
Democratic	Darren Jackson	1,468	39.57%
Total votes		3,710	100%

=== 2002 ===
North Carolina House of Representatives 39th district Democratic primary election, 2002
Party	Candidate	Votes	%
Democratic	Darren Jackson	2,176	44.26%
Democratic	Barry B. Perry	1,813	36.88%
Democratic	Bobby Hoffman	927	18.86%
Total votes		4,916	100%

North Carolina House of Representatives 39th district general election, 2002
Party	Candidate	Votes	%
Republican	Sam Ellis (incumbent)	13,875	56.62%
Democratic	Darren Jackson	10,105	41.24%
Libertarian	H. Wade Minter	524	2.14%
Total votes		24,504	100%
Republican hold			

North Carolina House of Representatives
Preceded by Larry Hall	Minority Leader of the North Carolina House of Representatives; 2017–2020	Succeeded by Robert Reives
