= James Roberson (politician) =

American politician

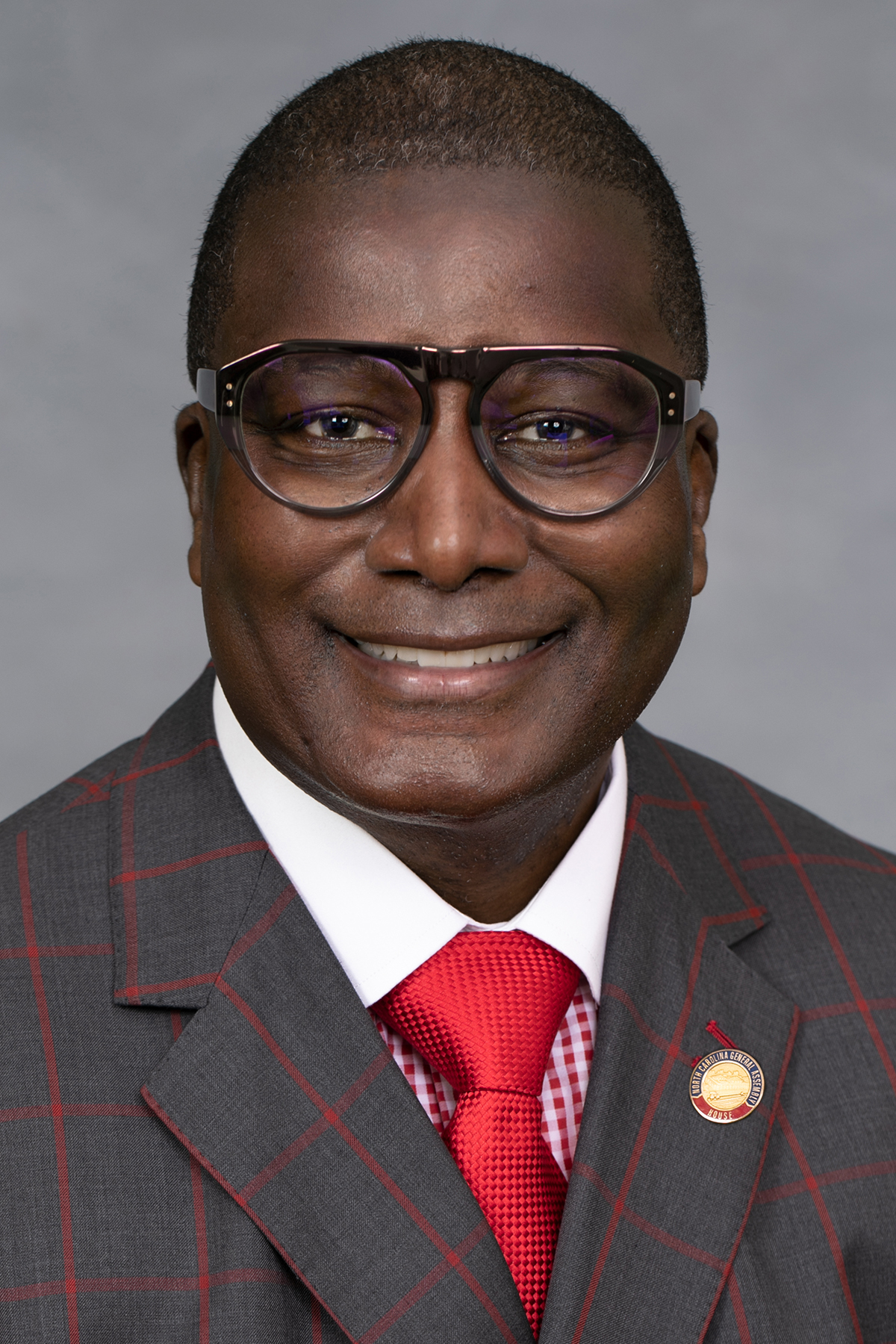

Member of the North Carolina House of Representatives from the 39th district
- Incumbent
- Assumed office January 11, 2021
- Preceded by: Darren Jackson

Mayor of Knightdale
- In office December 2015 – January 2021
- Preceded by: Russell Killen
- Succeeded by: Jessica Day

Member of the Knightdale Town Council
- In office December 2007 – December 2015
- Succeeded by: Pete Mangum

Personal details
- Party: Democratic
- Occupation: Sr. Dean and CCO of Wake Technical Community College Western Wake Campus
- Website: Official website

James Roberson is a Democratic member of the North Carolina House of Representatives who has represented the 38th district (including parts of Wake County) since his appointment in 2021. Roberson previously served as Mayor of Knightdale, North Carolina from 2015 to 2021.

== Committee assignments ==
=== 2021–2022 session ===
- Appropriations
- Appropriations – Agriculture and Natural and Economic Resources
- Insurance
- Pensions and Retirement
- State Personnel

== Electoral history ==
Knightdale Mayoral election, 2019
Candidate	Votes	%
James Roberson (incumbent)	817	95.22%
Write-in	27	3.15%
Charles Bullock (write-in)	14	1.63%
Total votes	858	100%

Knightdale Mayoral election, 2015
Candidate	Votes	%
James Roberson	707	79.62%
Charles Bullock	177	19.93%
Write-in	4	0.45%
Total votes	888	100%

North Carolina House of Representatives
Preceded by Darren Jackson	Member of the North Carolina House of Representatives from the 39th District; 2021–present	Incumbent
