= Sue Myrick =

American politician (born 1941)

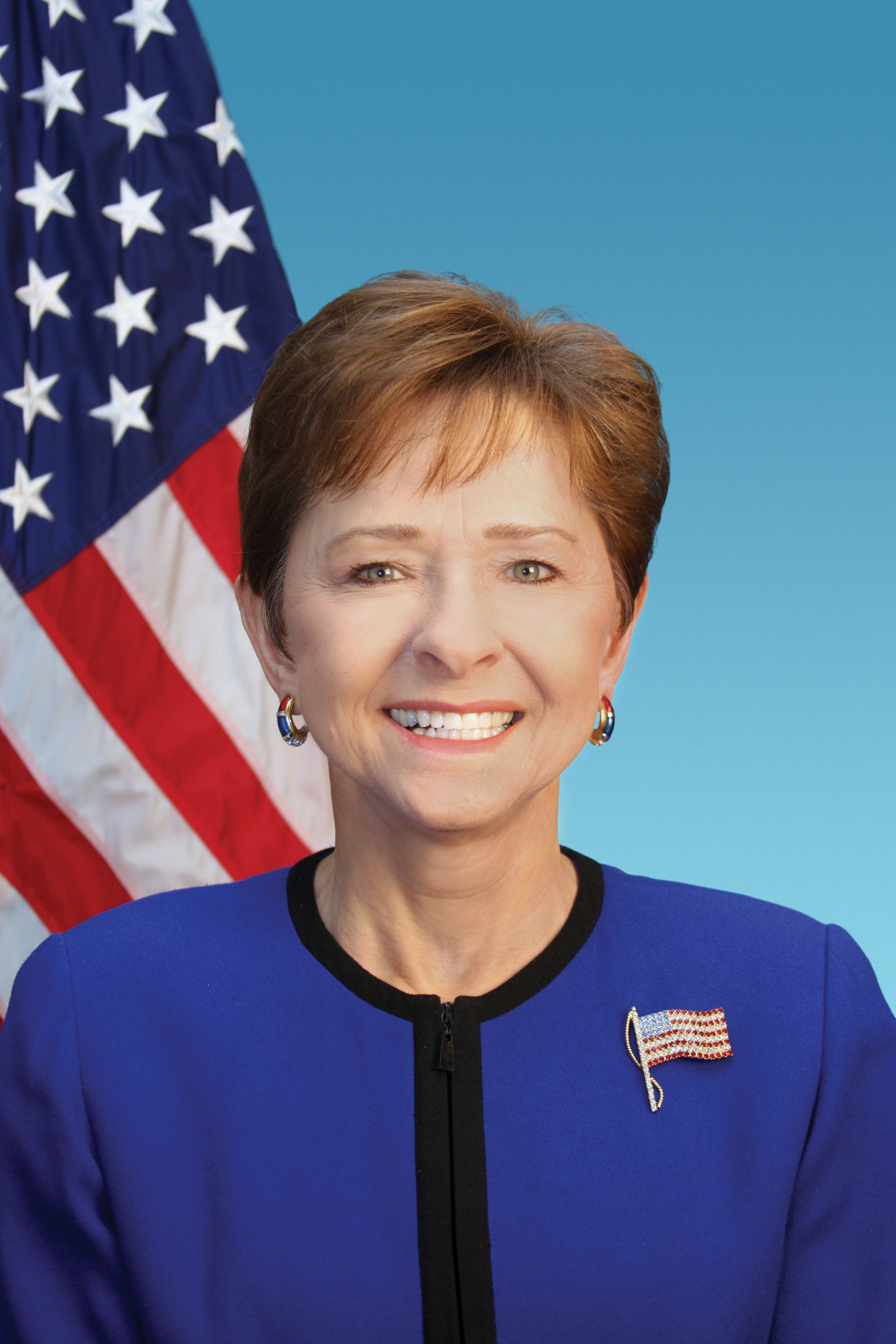
- Official portrait, 2011

Chair of the Republican Study Committee
- In office January 3, 2003 – January 3, 2005
- Preceded by: John Shadegg
- Succeeded by: Mike Pence

Member of the U.S. House of Representatives from North Carolina's 9th district
- In office January 3, 1995 – January 3, 2013
- Preceded by: Alex McMillan
- Succeeded by: Robert Pittenger

51st Mayor of Charlotte
- In office 1987–1991
- Preceded by: Harvey Gantt
- Succeeded by: Richard Vinroot

Personal details
- Born: Sue Ellen Wilkins; August 1, 1941 (age 85) Tiffin, Ohio, U.S.
- Party: Republican
- Spouse(s): Jim Forest (divorced) Ed Myrick
- Children: 2, including Dan; 3 stepchildren
- Education: Heidelberg University, Ohio (attended)

Sue Ellen Myrick (née Wilkins; born August 1, 1941) is an American businesswoman and the former U.S. Representative for North Carolina's 9th congressional district, serving from 1995 to 2013. She is a member of the Republican Party. She was the first Republican woman to represent North Carolina in Congress. On February 7, 2012, she announced that she was retiring. She left Congress in January 2013 and was succeeded by Robert Pittenger.

Myrick's son Dan Forest was the 34th Lieutenant Governor of North Carolina.

== Early life, education, and business career ==
Myrick was born in 1941 in Tiffin, Ohio. She graduated from Port Clinton High School in Port Clinton, Ottawa County, Ohio. She attended Heidelberg University in Tiffin, Seneca County, Ohio between 1959 and 1960. Prior to going into public relations and advertising, she was a Sunday school teacher. She is the former president and CEO of Myrick Advertising and Public Relations and Myrick Enterprises.

== Charlotte city politics ==
Myrick ran for a seat on the Charlotte City Council unsuccessfully in 1981. In 1983, she was elected to an At-Large District of the City Council and served until 1985. In 1987, she was elected as the first female Mayor of Charlotte, North Carolina. In 1989, when Sue Myrick was running for re-election as mayor of Charlotte, NC, she confessed to having had a relationship with her husband in 1973 while he was still married to his former wife. (She went on to win the election.)

== 1992 U.S. Senate election ==
In 1992, she ran for the nomination for a U.S. Senate seat, held by incumbent Democratic U.S. Senator Terry Sanford. The Republican primary was won by Lauch Faircloth, who defeated Myrick and former U.S. Representative Walter Johnston 48%–30%–17%.

== U.S. House of Representatives ==
=== Elections ===
In 1994, Myrick was elected to the House, succeeding five-term incumbent Alex McMillan.

Myrick was overwhelmingly elected to her sixth consecutive term in the 2004 Congressional elections, earning 70% of the popular vote and defeating Democrat Jack Flynn. Similarly, she defeated Democrat William Glass in 2006 with almost 67% of the vote.

Two Charlotte-area Democrats announced challenges to Myrick in 2008 – Harry Taylor and Ross Overby. Myrick defeated Taylor with almost 63% of the vote.

=== Retirement ===
On February 7, 2012, Myrick announced her retirement from Congress.

=== Tenure ===
Myrick was one of the most conservative members of the House. She chaired the Republican Study Committee, a group of House conservatives, in the 108th Congress.

As a cancer survivor herself, she has been a vocal advocate to find a cure for breast cancer. While in Congress she introduced a bill to provide treatment for women on Medicaid diagnosed with breast cancer. The bill passed and was signed into law. Women previously diagnosed under Medicaid had no treatment options.

Myrick was one of the leading Republican opponents of an abortive 2006 sale of operations at six major American ports along the East Coast to Dubai Ports World, a state-owned company from the United Arab Emirates.

=== Committee assignments ===
- Committee on Energy and Commerce (Vice Chair)
  - Subcommittee on Health
  - Subcommittee on Oversight and Investigations (Vice Chair - Full Committee)
- Permanent Select Committee on Intelligence (Chair of the Subcommittee on Terrorism, HUMINT, Analysis, and Counterintelligence)

=== Caucus memberships ===
- Deputy Whip
- Congressional Anti-Terrorism Caucus (Founder)
- House Cancer Caucus (Co-Chair)
- International Conservation Caucus
- Republican Study Committee (First woman chairman, 2003–2005)
- Sportsmen's Caucus
- Tea Party Caucus

== Personal life ==
Sue is a wife and a mother of two children and three step-children. She and her husband, Ed Myrick, have 12 grandchildren, 11 great grandchildren, and 2 great great grandchildren. Her second son, Dan Forest, was elected Lieutenant Governor of North Carolina in 2012.

== See also ==
- Women in the United States House of Representatives

Political offices
Preceded by Harvey Gantt	Mayor of Charlotte; 1987–1991	Succeeded by Richard Vinroot
U.S. House of Representatives
Preceded by Alex McMillan	Member of the U.S. House of Representatives from North Carolina's 9th congressional district 1995–2013	Succeeded by Robert Pittenger
Party political offices
Preceded by John Shadegg	Chair of the Republican Study Committee; 2003–2005	Succeeded by Mike Pence
U.S. order of precedence (ceremonial)
Preceded by Brian Higgins as Former U.S. Representative	Order of precedence of the United States as Former U.S. Representative	Succeeded by Mike McIntyre as Former U.S. Representative
