= North Carolina's 39th House district =

American legislative district

North Carolina's 39th State House of Representatives district
Representative
James Roberson; D–Knightdale
- Demographics: 40% White; 31% Black; 21% Hispanic; 3% Asian; 1% Other; 3% Multiracial
- Population (2024): 92,779

North Carolina's 39th House district is one of 120 districts in the North Carolina House of Representatives. It has been represented by Democrat James Roberson since his appointment on January 11, 2021.

== Geography ==
Since 2003, the district has included part northeastern of Wake County. The district overlaps with the 13th, 14th, and 18th Senate districts.

== District officeholders ==
=== Multi-member district ===
Representative	Party	Dates	Notes	Representative	Party	Dates	Notes	Representative	Party	Dates	Notes	Representative	Party	Dates	Notes	Representative	Party	Dates	Notes	Counties
District created January 1, 1967.
Homer Tolbert (Cleveland)	Republican	January 1, 1967 – January 1, 1971		Gilbert Lee Boger (Mocksville)	Republican	January 1, 1967 – January 1, 1971														1967–1973; All of Iredell and Davie Counties.
Arthur (Sap) Smith (Mooresville)	Democratic	January 1, 1971 – January 1, 1973		J. P. Huskins (Statesville)	Democratic	January 1, 1971 – January 1, 1973	Redistricted to the 35th district.													1967–1973; All of Iredell and Davie Counties.
William Fulton (Morganton)	Republican	January 1, 1973 – January 1, 1975	Redistricted from the 42nd district.	Lloyd Hise Jr. (Spruce Pine)	Republican	January 1, 1973 – January 1, 1975														1973–1983; All of Burke, Avery, and Mitchell Counties.
W. H. Lachot Jr. (Morganton)	Democratic	January 1, 1975 – January 1, 1979		Myrtle Wiseman (Spruce Pine)	Democratic	January 1, 1975 – January 1, 1979														1973–1983; All of Burke, Avery, and Mitchell Counties.
Swan Burnett Lacey Jr. (Newland)	Republican	January 1, 1979 – January 1, 1983	Redistricted to the 46th district.	Van Phillips (Spruce Pine)	Democratic	January 1, 1979 – January 1, 1981														1973–1983; All of Burke, Avery, and Mitchell Counties.
Swan Burnett Lacey Jr. (Newland)	Republican	January 1, 1979 – January 1, 1983	Redistricted to the 46th district.	James Frank Hughes (Linville)	Republican	January 1, 1981 – January 1, 1983	Redistricted to the 46th district.													1973–1983; All of Burke, Avery, and Mitchell Counties.
R. J. Childress (Winston-Salem)	Democratic	January 1, 1983 – January 1, 1985		C. B. Hauser (Winston-Salem)	Democratic	January 1, 1983 – January 1, 1985	Redistricted to the 67th district.	Annie Brown Kennedy (Winston-Salem)	Democratic	January 1, 1983 – January 1, 1985	Redistricted to the 66th district.	Margaret Tennille (Winston-Salem)	Democratic	January 1, 1983 – January 1, 1985	Redistricted from the 29th district.	Tom Womble (Clemmons)	Democratic	January 1, 1983 – January 1, 1985		1983–1993; Part of Forsyth County.
Ann Quarterman Duncan (Pfafftown)	Republican	January 1, 1985 – September 27, 1989	Resigned.	Theresa Harlow Esposito (Winston-Salem)	Republican	January 1, 1985 – January 1, 1993	Redistricted to the 88th district.	Frank Edwin Rhodes (Winston-Salem)	Republican	January 1, 1985 – January 1, 1993										1983–1993; Part of Forsyth County.
Lyons Gray (Winston-Salem)	Republican	September 27, 1989 – January 1, 1993	Appointed to finish Duncan's term. Redistricted to the single-member district.	Theresa Harlow Esposito (Winston-Salem)	Republican	January 1, 1985 – January 1, 1993	Redistricted to the 88th district.	Frank Edwin Rhodes (Winston-Salem)	Republican	January 1, 1985 – January 1, 1993										1983–1993; Part of Forsyth County.

=== Single-member district ===
Representative	Party	Dates	Notes	Counties
Lyons Gray (Winston-Salem)	Republican	January 1, 1993 – January 1, 2003	Redistricted from the multi-member district. Redistricted to the 93rd district and retired.	1993–2003; Part of Forsyth County.
Sam Ellis (Raleigh)	Republican	January 1, 2003 – January 1, 2005	Redistricted from the 15th district. Lost re-election.	2003–Present; Part of Wake County.
Linda Coleman (Knightdale)	Democratic	January 1, 2005 – January 11, 2009	Resigned.	2003–Present; Part of Wake County.
Vacant		January 11, 2009 – January 26, 2009		2003–Present; Part of Wake County.
Darren Jackson (Raleigh)	Democratic	January 26, 2009 – December 30, 2020	Appointed to finish Coleman's term. Resigned to become Court of Appeals judge.	2003–Present; Part of Wake County.
Vacant		December 30, 2020 – January 11, 2021		2003–Present; Part of Wake County.
James Roberson (Knightdale)	Democratic	January 11, 2021 – Present	Appointed to finish Jackson's term.	2003–Present; Part of Wake County.

== Election results ==
=== 2024 ===
North Carolina House of Representatives 39th district general election, 2024
Party	Candidate	Votes	%
Democratic	James Roberson (incumbent)	36,730	100%
Total votes		36,730	100%
Democratic hold			

=== 2022 ===
North Carolina House of Representatives 39th district general election, 2022
Party	Candidate	Votes	%
Democratic	James Roberson (incumbent)	18,545	60.18%
Republican	Greg Jones	12,273	39.82%
Total votes		30,818	100%
Democratic hold			

=== 2020 ===
North Carolina House of Representatives 39th district general election, 2020
Party	Candidate	Votes	%
Democratic	Darren Jackson (incumbent)	41,783	100%
Total votes		41,783	100%
Democratic hold			

=== 2018 ===
North Carolina House of Representatives 39th district general election, 2018
Party	Candidate	Votes	%
Democratic	Darren Jackson (incumbent)	24,172	66.40%
Republican	Rhonda Allen	11,441	31.43%
Libertarian	Martin Mazuldowski	789	2.17%
Total votes		36,402	100%
Democratic hold			

=== 2016 ===
North Carolina House of Representatives 39th district general election, 2016
Party	Candidate	Votes	%
Democratic	Darren Jackson (incumbent)	31,901	100%
Total votes		31,901	100%
Democratic hold			

=== 2014 ===
North Carolina House of Representatives 39th district general election, 2014
Party	Candidate	Votes	%
Democratic	Darren Jackson (incumbent)	18,823	100%
Total votes		18,823	100%
Democratic hold			

=== 2012 ===
North Carolina House of Representatives 39th district Democratic primary election, 2012
Party	Candidate	Votes	%
Democratic	Darren Jackson (incumbent)	5,879	60.98%
Democratic	Don Mial	2,846	29.52%
Democratic	Michael Slawter	916	9.50%
Total votes		9,641	100%

North Carolina House of Representatives 39th district general election, 2012
Party	Candidate	Votes	%
Democratic	Darren Jackson (incumbent)	27,585	100%
Total votes		27,585	100%
Democratic hold			

=== 2010 ===
North Carolina House of Representatives 39th district Democratic primary election, 2010
Party	Candidate	Votes	%
Democratic	Darren Jackson (incumbent)	2,175	60.72%
Democratic	Jeanne Milliken Bonds	1,407	39.28%
Total votes		3,582	100%

North Carolina House of Representatives 39th district general election, 2010
Party	Candidate	Votes	%
Democratic	Darren Jackson (incumbent)	16,870	56.84%
Republican	Duane Cutlip	12,809	43.16%
Total votes		29,679	100%
Democratic hold			

=== 2008 ===
North Carolina House of Representatives 39th district general election, 2008
Party	Candidate	Votes	%
Democratic	Linda Coleman (incumbent)	29,290	64.24%
Republican	Duane Cutlip	16,306	35.76%
Total votes		45,596	100%
Democratic hold			

=== 2006 ===
North Carolina House of Representatives 39th district general election, 2006
Party	Candidate	Votes	%
Democratic	Linda Coleman (incumbent)	11,737	58.73%
Republican	John W. Blackwell	8,246	41.27%
Total votes		19,983	100%
Democratic hold			

=== 2004 ===
North Carolina House of Representatives 39th district Democratic primary election, 2004
Party	Candidate	Votes	%
Democratic	Linda Coleman	2,242	60.43%
Democratic	Darren Jackson	1,468	39.57%
Total votes		3,710	100%

North Carolina House of Representatives 39th district Republican primary election, 2004
Party	Candidate	Votes	%
Republican	Sam Ellis (incumbent)	1,858	61.85%
Republican	Jeff Eddins	1,146	38.15%
Total votes		3,004	100%

North Carolina House of Representatives 39th district general election, 2004
Party	Candidate	Votes	%
Democratic	Linda Coleman	18,480	54.40%
Republican	Sam Ellis (incumbent)	15,488	45.60%
Total votes		33,968	100%
Democratic gain from Republican			

=== 2002 ===
North Carolina House of Representatives 39th district Democratic primary election, 2002
Party	Candidate	Votes	%
Democratic	Darren Jackson	2,176	44.26%
Democratic	Barry B. Perry	1,813	36.88%
Democratic	Bobby Hoffman	927	18.86%
Total votes		4,916	100%

North Carolina House of Representatives 39th district general election, 2002
Party	Candidate	Votes	%
Republican	Sam Ellis (incumbent)	13,875	56.62%
Democratic	Darren Jackson	10,105	41.24%
Libertarian	H. Wade Minter	524	2.14%
Total votes		24,504	100%
Republican hold			

=== 2000 ===
North Carolina House of Representatives 39th district general election, 2000
Party	Candidate	Votes	%
Republican	Lyons Gray (incumbent)	21,263	100%
Total votes		21,263	100%
Republican hold			
