= Dan Forest =

34th Lieutenant Governor of North Carolina

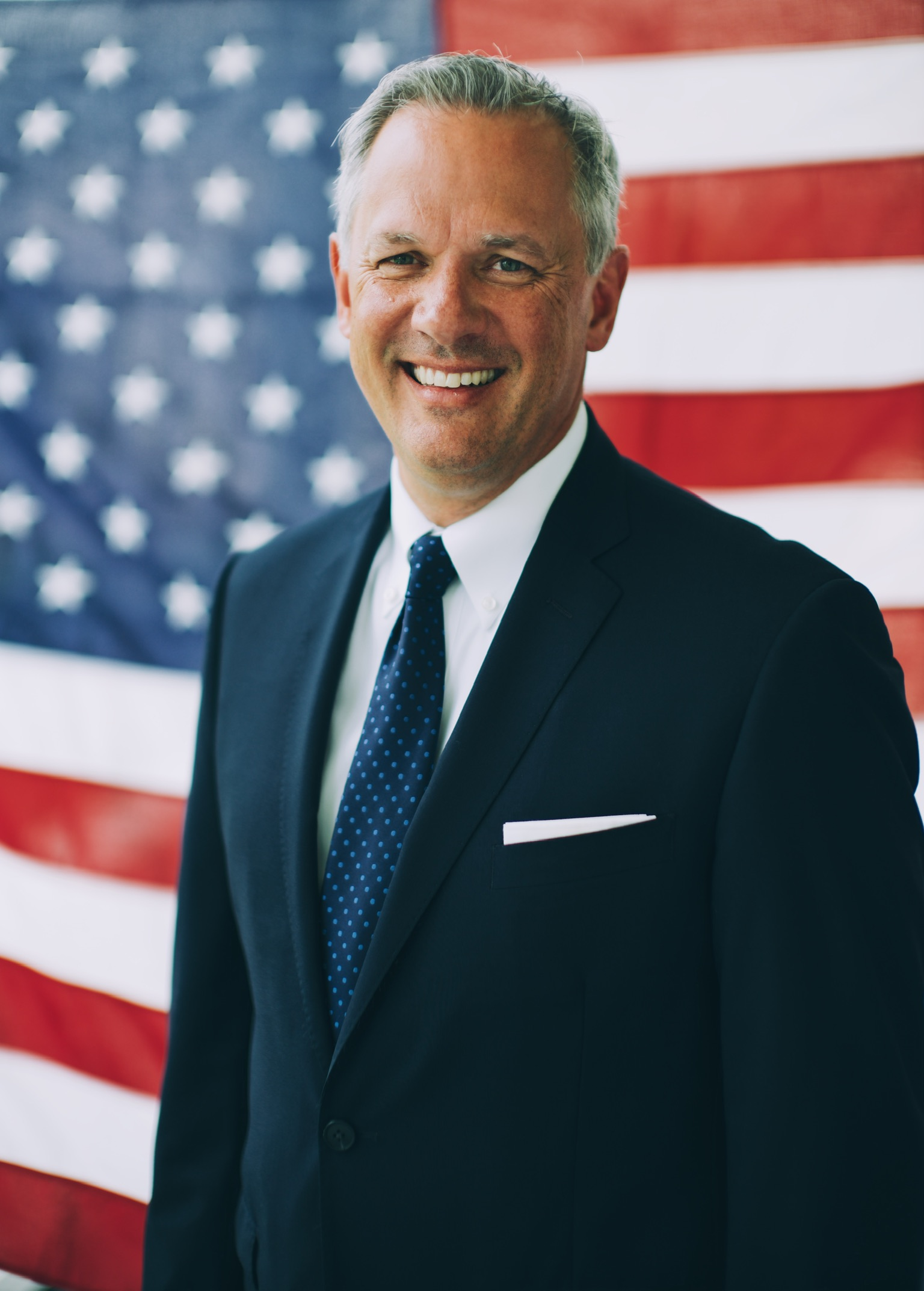
- Forest in 2019

34th Lieutenant Governor of North Carolina
- In office January 7, 2013 – January 9, 2021
- Governor: Pat McCrory; Roy Cooper
- Preceded by: Walter Dalton
- Succeeded by: Mark Robinson

Personal details
- Born: Daniel James Forest; October 15, 1967 (age 58) Harrisonburg, Virginia, U.S.
- Party: Republican
- Spouse: Alice Forest
- Children: 4
- Parent: Sue Myrick (mother)
- Education: University of North Carolina, Charlotte (BArch, MArch)

Daniel James Forest (born October 15, 1967) is an American politician who served as the 34th lieutenant governor of North Carolina from 2013 to 2021. He is the son of former congresswoman Sue Myrick. An architect by trade, he was the Republican nominee for Governor of North Carolina in the 2020 election, losing to incumbent governor Roy Cooper.

== Early life and education ==
Forest was born in Harrisonburg, Virginia, and grew up in Charlotte, North Carolina. His mother, Sue Myrick, represented a Charlotte-based congressional district from 1995 to 2013 in the U.S. House of Representatives. Forest received a bachelor's degree and a master's degree in architecture from the University of North Carolina at Charlotte. An architect, Forest was a senior partner at an architectural firm in Charlotte before being elected lieutenant governor.

== Lieutenant Governor of North Carolina (2013–2021) ==
=== Elections ===
In 2012, in his first run for office, Forest placed first in a five-way May primary election, with 32.98% of the vote; Wake County commissioner Tony Gurley received 24.83% of the vote, Speaker Pro Tempore of the North Carolina House of Representatives Dale Folwell received 24.25% of the vote; state representative Grey Mills received 14.67% of the vote, and Arthur Jason Rich received 3.28% of the vote. Forest and Gurley advanced to the July 2012 second primary (runoff election), in which Forest secured the Republican nomination, defeating Gurley 67.87%–32.13%.

In the November 2012 general election, Forest defeated the Democratic nominee, former state representative Linda Coleman, by an extremely small margin—Forest received 2,187,728 votes (50.08%) to Coleman's 2,180,870 (49.92%). Coleman opted not to seek a recount, although the margin was small enough for her to be entitled to one. He was sworn in on January 7, 2013.

In a November 2016 rematch against Coleman, Forest was re-elected lieutenant governor, receiving 2,393,514 votes (51.81%) to Coleman's 2,093,375 votes (45.32%); Libertarian Party candidate Jacki Cole received 132,645 (2.87%). His second term began on January 1, 2017.

=== Tenure in office ===
As lieutenant governor, Forest was the state's second-highest elected official and the president of the North Carolina Senate, as well as a member of the Council of State. Forest began a one-year term as the chairman of the Republican Lieutenant Governors Association in 2018.

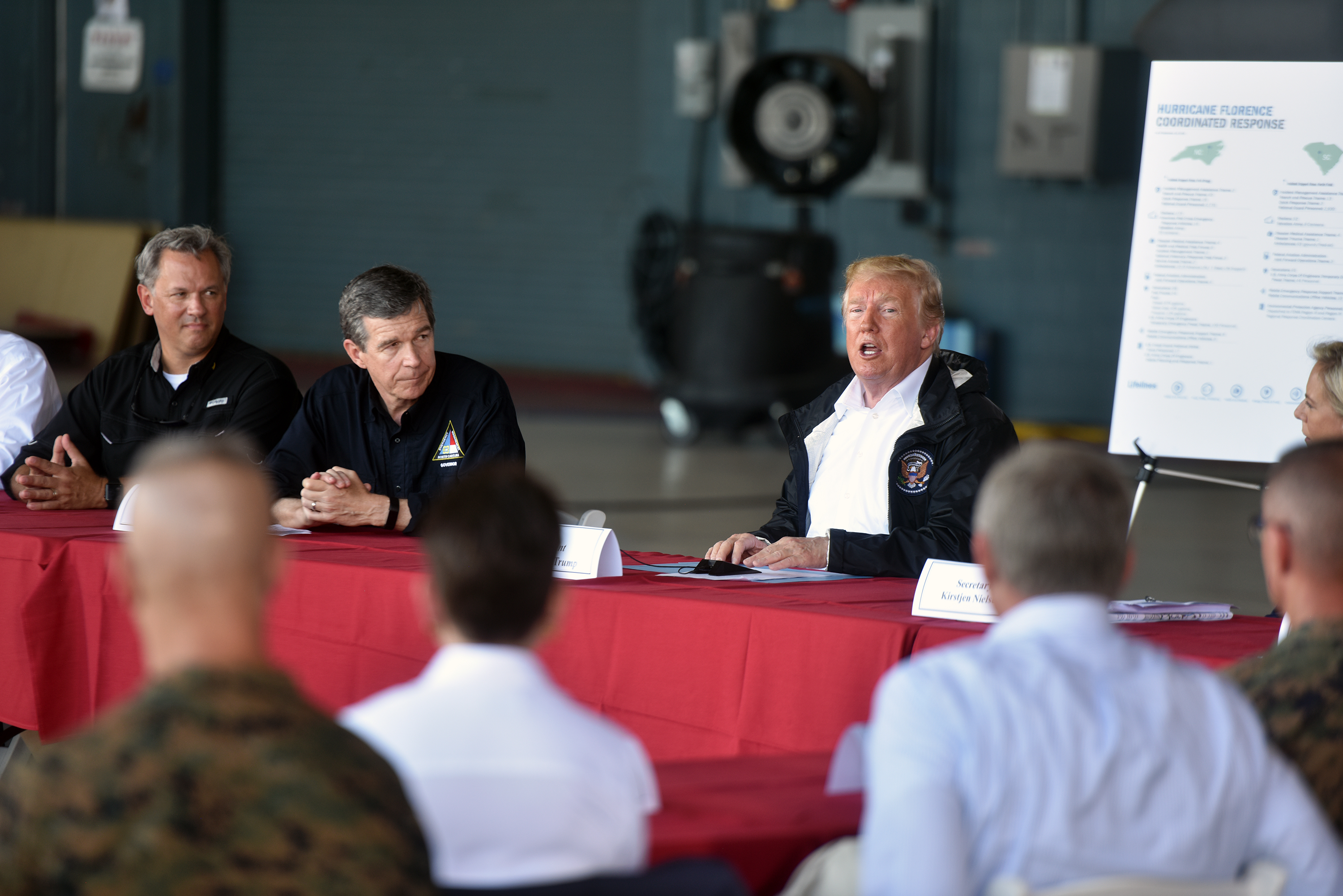
Forest (far left) meeting with Governor Roy Cooper and President Donald Trump to discuss Hurricane Florence recovery efforts, 2018

Forest emphasized his fiscally conservative and socially conservative views. He was a strong supporter of North Carolina's controversial H.B. 2, state legislation that overrode an ordinance passed by the City of Charlotte that extended the protection of anti-discrimination laws to LGBT persons. Forest was also a leading supporter of proposals to adopt a state "religious freedom restoration" act, a controversial bill on religion. Forest supports the elimination of income tax and its replacement by a "consumption tax".

During his term, he renovated and refurbished the Hawkins-Hartness House, which serves as the official office of the lieutenant governor.

As lieutenant governor, Forest appeared with Trump at a rally in 2016, at which he voiced support for Trump. In a 2018 speech to the conservative think tank Civitas, Forest asserted that political issues such as climate change and gun control "really is the religion of the left" and that "the left...don't have a hope in God. They have no hope in a higher power." Forest's remarks were criticized by Democrats; state senators Paul Lowe Jr. and Mike Woodard said that the comments "only serve to insult, belittle and divide people of faith, no matter their political beliefs." In a June 2019 speech to a church, Forest stated that no nation "has survived the diversity and multiculturalism that America faces today"; the remark prompted criticism.

In mid-March 2020, Forest opposed Governor Roy Cooper's closure of bars and restriction of restaurants to take-out and delivery only on the grounds it didn't give bars and restaurants enough time to prepare, and in mid-April, Forest called for the immediate reopening of public places with non-binding guidance from state government. In June 2020, Forest announced that he was suing Governor Cooper over his coronavirus executive orders, alleging that the governor could not issue the directives without the concurrence of the Council of State. The lawsuit was later withdrawn after a loss in Superior Court.

== 2020 North Carolina gubernatorial election ==
In January 2019, Forest announced the formation of an exploratory committee to run for governor to challenge incumbent Democratic governor Roy Cooper in 2020. At the outset, Representative Mark Meadows, Chair of the House Freedom Caucus, indicated his support for Forest. In August 2019, Forest formally launched his campaign. In announcing his run, Forest denounced "socialism" and highlighted his strongly anti-abortion views. During his campaign, Forest also called for an expanded state-funded school voucher program for which all North Carolinians, irrespective of income, would be eligible, making this proposal a centerpiece of his campaign.

In the Republican primary election in March 2020, Forest won the party's nomination, defeating state Representative Holly Grange of New Hanover by a broad margin.

Although the race for governor in North Carolina occurred in an important swing state, attention to the campaign was largely overshadowed by the 2020 coronavirus (COVID-19) pandemic. In late March 2020, Cooper issued a stay-at-home directive and ordered the temporary closure of nonessential businesses to control the spread of the virus, beginning a phased, multi-step reopening in early May 2020 tied to benchmarks. By contrast, Forest suggested that the dangers of the virus to most Americans had been exaggerated and echoed "Liberate" protesters. Forest incorrectly claimed that influenza had killed more North Carolinians in 2020 than the coronavirus. In September 2020, Forest said that, if elected, he would immediately reopen all K-12 public schools for in-person learning. When asked whether K-12 students returning to school should wear masks, Forest said, "I don't think so, I don't think there's any science that backs that up. That's my personal opinion."

In April 2020, the Forest campaign said it had given nearly $200,000 from the gubernatorial campaign fund for COVID-19 economic assistance in North Carolina. Forest also asserted that COVID-19-related restrictions were being used by "the left" to hurt the church. During the pandemic, Forest met in close contact with others without wearing a face mask, in contravention of social distancing guidelines; he dismissed criticism as "ludicrous" and "stupid leftist talk."

On November 3, 2020, Cooper defeated Forest 52% to 47%, in the general election.

Following his loss, Forest had been mentioned as a potential candidate for the 2022 North Carolina Senate race to fill the seat then held by Senator Richard Burr, who did not seek re-election.

== Electoral history ==
North Carolina Lieutenant Governor Republican primary election, 2012
| Party | Candidate | Votes | % |
| Republican | Dan Forest | 253,656 | 32.98 |
| Republican | Tony Gurley | 190,980 | 24.83 |
| Republican | Dale Folwell | 186,564 | 24.25 |
| Republican | Grey Mills | 112,824 | 14.67 |
| Republican | Arthur Jason Rich | 25,206 | 3.28 |

North Carolina Lieutenant Governor Republican primary runoff election, 2012
| Party | Candidate | Votes | % |
| Republican | Dan Forest | 101,961 | 67.87 |
| Republican | Tony Gurley | 48,278 | 32.13 |

North Carolina Lieutenant Governor Election, 2012
| Party | Candidate | Votes | % |
| Republican | Dan Forest | 2,187,728 | 50.08 |
| Democratic | Linda Coleman | 2,180,870 | 49.92 |

North Carolina Lieutenant Governor Election, 2016
| Party | Candidate | Votes | % |
| Republican | Dan Forest (incumbent) | 2,393,514 | 51.81 |
| Democratic | Linda Coleman | 2,093,375 | 45.32 |
| Libertarian | Jacki Cole | 132,645 | 2.87 |

2020 North Carolina Gubernatorial Election
| Party | Candidate | Votes | % |
| Democratic | Roy Cooper (incumbent) | 2,834,790 | 51.52 |
| Republican | Dan Forest | 2,586,604 | 47.01 |
| Libertarian | Steven DiFiore | 60,449 | 1.10 |
| Constitution | Al Pisano | 20,934 | .38 |

Party political offices
| Preceded by Robert Pittenger | Republican nominee for Lieutenant Governor of North Carolina; 2012, 2016 | Succeeded by Mark Robinson |
| Preceded by Pat McCrory | Republican nominee for Governor of North Carolina; 2020 | Succeeded by Mark Robinson |
Political offices
| Preceded by Walter Dalton | Lieutenant Governor of North Carolina; 2013–2021 | Succeeded by Mark Robinson |
