= 2016 North Carolina lieutenant gubernatorial election =

- November 8, 2016
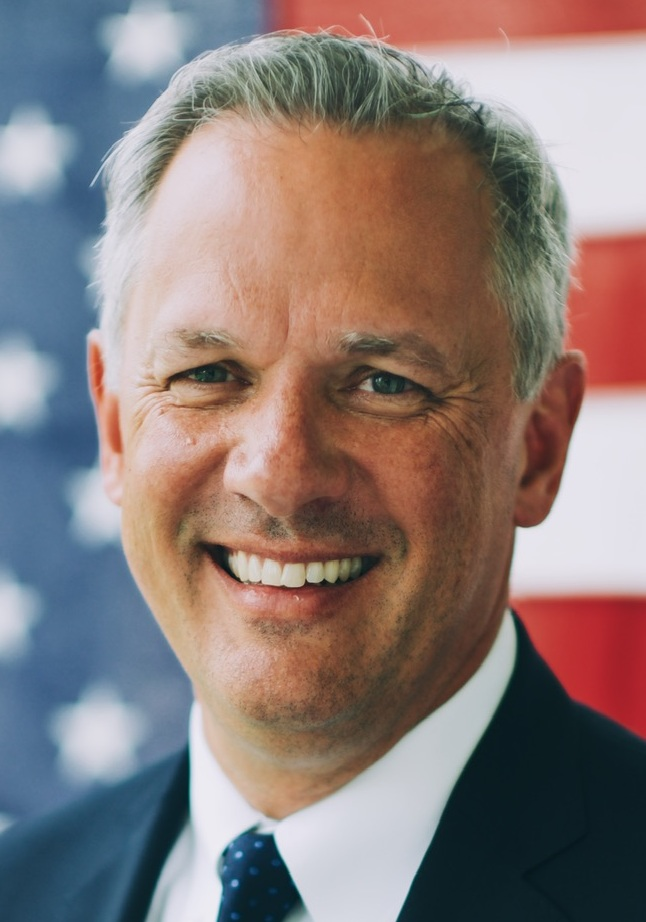

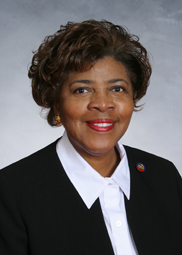
Nominee	Dan Forest	Linda Coleman
Party	Republican	Democratic
Popular vote	2,393,515	2,093,380
Percentage	51.8%	45.3%
- Forest: 40–50% 50–60% 60–70% 70–80% 80–90% >90% Coleman: 40–50% 50–60% 60–70% 70–80% 80–90% >90% Tie: 40–50%
Lieutenant Governor before election
Dan Forest
Republican
Elected Lieutenant Governor
Dan Forest
Republican

The 2016 North Carolina lieutenant gubernatorial election took place on November 8, 2016, to elect the Lieutenant Governor of North Carolina, concurrently with the 2016 U.S. presidential election, as well as elections to the United States Senate and elections to the United States House of Representatives and various state and local elections. Primary elections were held March 15.

In North Carolina, the Governor and Lieutenant Governor are elected separately.

Incumbent Republican Lieutenant Governor Dan Forest ran for re-election to a second term in office. Linda Coleman was the Democratic nominee, making the general election a rematch of the 2012 contest that Forest won by a narrow margin.

Forest won re-election to a second term, despite Republican Governor Pat McCrory losing reelection by a narrow margin.

== Republican primary ==
=== Candidates ===
==== Declared ====
- Dan Forest, incumbent Lieutenant Governor

== Democratic primary ==
=== Candidates ===
==== Declared ====
- Linda Coleman, former Director of the Office of State Personnel, former State Representative and nominee for Lieutenant Governor in 2012
- Holly Jones, Buncombe County Commissioner
- Ron Newton, tax attorney and financial services company owner
- Robert Wilson, former North Carolina Assistant Secretary of State

==== Declined ====
- Gene McLaurin, former State Senator and former Mayor of Rockingham
- Steve Rao, Morrisville Town Councilman
- Chris Rey, Mayor of Spring Lake (running for U.S. Senate)
- James Taylor, Winston-Salem City Council Member

=== Results ===
Primary results by county: Coleman: Coleman—71-80%; Coleman—61-70%; Coleman—51-60%; Coleman—41-50%; Coleman—31-40%; Jones: Jones—71-80%; Jones—51-60%; Jones—41-50%; Jones—31-40%; Wilson: Wilson—41-50%; Wilson—31-40%

Democratic primary results
Party	Candidate	Votes	%
Democratic	Linda Coleman	500,128	51.1
Democratic	Holly Jones	281,132	28.7
Democratic	Robert Wilson	102,870	10.5
Democratic	Ronald Newton	94,312	9.7
Total votes		978,442	100.0

== Libertarian primary ==
=== Candidates ===
==== Declared ====
- Jacki Cole, marketing/sales professional

==== Withdrawn ====
- J.J. Summerell, chairman of the Libertarian Party of North Carolina (running for Congress instead of for Lt. Governor)

== General election ==
=== Polling ===
Poll source	Date(s) administered	Sample size	Margin of error	Dan Forest (R)	Linda Coleman (D)	Other	Undecided
SurveyUSA	October 28–31, 2016	659	± 3.9%	49%	42%	2%	7%
Public Policy Polling	October 21–22, 2016	875	± 3.3%	41%	37%	4%	19%
Civitas Institute	October 14–18, 2016	651	± 3.1%	37%	32%	9%	17%
Public Policy Polling	September 18–20, 2016	1,024	± 3.1%	38%	35%	4%	23%
Civitas Institute	September 11–12, 2016	600	± 4.0%	35%	39%	4%	21%
Public Policy Polling	August 5–7, 2016	830	± 3.4%	37%	37%	5%	20%
Public Policy Polling	June 20–21, 2016	947	± 3.2%	37%	37%	4%	22%
Civitas Institute	May 21–23, 2016	600	± 4.0%	36%	36%	3%	24%
Public Policy Polling	May 20–22, 2016	928	± 3.2%	38%	38%	5%	19%
Public Policy Polling	April 22–24, 2016	960	± 3.2%	38%	37%	6%	19%
Public Policy Polling	March 18–20, 2016	843	± 3.4%	33%	36%	—	25%
Public Policy Polling	July 2–6, 2015	529	± 4.3%	43%	36%	—	21%
Public Policy Polling	May 28–31, 2015	561	± 4.1%	41%	37%	—	23%
Public Policy Polling	April 2–5, 2015	751	± 3.6%	40%	36%	—	24%
Public Policy Polling	February 24–26, 2015	849	± 3.4%	40%	35%	—	25%

=== Results ===
North Carolina lieutenant gubernatorial election, 2016
Party	Candidate	Votes	%	±%
Republican	Dan Forest (incumbent)	2,393,514	51.81%	+1.73%
Democratic	Linda Coleman	2,093,375	45.32%	−4.60%
Libertarian	Jacki Cole	132,645	2.87%	N/A
Total votes		4,619,534	100.00%	N/A
Republican hold				
