= Lyons Gray =

American politician from North Carolina

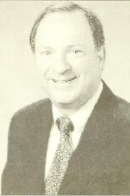
- Gray in the 2001 legislative manual

Secretary of the North Carolina Department of Revenue
- In office 2013–2016
- Governor: Pat McCrory
- Preceded by: David Hoyle
- Succeeded by: Jeff Epstein

Member of the North Carolina House of Representatives from the 39th district
- In office September 27, 1989 – January 1, 2003
- Preceded by: Ann Quarterman Duncan
- Succeeded by: Bill McGee (Redistricting)

Personal details
- Born: October 28, 1942 (age 83) Winston-Salem, North Carolina
- Party: Republican
- Relations: Bowman Gray Sr. (grandfather)
- Education: Wooster School
- Alma mater: University of North Carolina

Lyons Gray (born October 28, 1942) is an American businessman and politician.

Gray was born in Winston-Salem, North Carolina. He graduated from Wooster School in 1961 and from University of North Carolina in 1966. Gray also served in the United States Coast Guard in 1964 and 1965. Gray was involved in business. Gray served in the North Carolina House of Representatives from 1989 to 2003 and was a Republican. He was appointed to the seat after Ann Q. Duncan resigned in September 1989. Gray also worked for R.J. Reynolds Tobacco Company. He served as North Carolina Secretary of Revenue. Gray was the grandson of Bowman Gray Sr.

== Recent electoral history ==
=== 2000 ===
North Carolina House of Representatives 39th district general election, 2000
Party	Candidate	Votes	%
Republican	Lyons Gray (incumbent)	21,263	100%
Total votes		21,263	100%
Republican hold			

North Carolina House of Representatives
Preceded by Ann Quarterman Duncan	Member of the North Carolina House of Representatives from the 39th district 1989–2003; Served alongside: Theresa Harlow Esposito, Frank Edwin Rhodes (1989–1993)	Succeeded by Sam Ellis
Political offices
Preceded by David Hoyle	Secretary of the North Carolina Department of Revenue; 2013–2016	Succeeded by Jeff Epstein
