= Linda Coleman (North Carolina politician) =

American politician from North Carolina (born 1949)

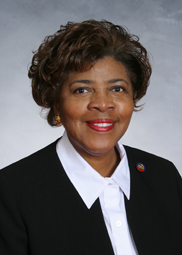

Member of the North Carolina House of Representatives from the 39th district
- In office January 1, 2005 – January 11, 2009
- Preceded by: Sam Ellis
- Succeeded by: Darren Jackson

Member of the Wake County Board of Commissioners from the 1st district
- In office December 7, 1998 – December 2, 2002
- Preceded by: Les Merritt
- Succeeded by: Joe Bryan

Personal details
- Born: July 12, 1949 (age 77) Greenville, North Carolina, U.S.
- Party: Democratic
- Education: North Carolina A&T State University (BA); University of Pittsburgh (MPA)

Linda Coleman (born July 12, 1949) is an American politician from the state of North Carolina. Coleman was elected to three terms as a Democratic state representative in the North Carolina General Assembly before being appointed director of the Office of State Personnel by the governor in 2009.

== Early life and education ==
She attended public schools in Greenville and North Carolina A&T University. She later earned a master's degree in public administration. Her first job out of college was as a classroom teacher.

== Early political career and state legislature ==
Before serving in the North Carolina House of Representatives, Coleman was a Wake County Commissioner for four years, and worked as human resources management director at the State Departments of Agriculture and Administration and as personnel director for the Department of Community Colleges.

In the legislature, she represented Eastern Wake County, North Carolina. Coleman was elected for the first time in 2004 and re-elected in 2006 and 2008. In her first term, she served as chair of her freshman class in the North Carolina House Democratic Caucus.

== Electoral history ==
=== 2018 U.S. House election ===
Coleman was the Democratic nominee for North Carolina's 2nd congressional district in the 2018 general election. She was narrowly defeated by incumbent Republican George Holding.

=== 2016 lieutenant gubernatorial election ===
Coleman ran for lieutenant governor again in 2016. She won the Democratic primary on March 15 with approximately 51 percent of the vote over three challengers. Coleman was defeated again by Forest in the November rematch.

=== 2012 lieutenant gubernatorial election ===
Coleman ran for Lieutenant Governor of North Carolina in the 2012 election, and had the backing of the State Employees Association of North Carolina. The News and Observer also endorsed Coleman, calling her "the better-qualified and more moderate choice." She lost the general election by a narrow margin to Republican Dan Forest.

=== 2008 ===
North Carolina House of Representatives 39th district general election, 2008
Party	Candidate	Votes	%
Democratic	Linda Coleman (incumbent)	29,290	64.24%
Republican	Duane Cutlip	16,306	35.76%
Total votes		45,596	100%
Democratic hold			

=== 2006 ===
North Carolina House of Representatives 39th district general election, 2006
Party	Candidate	Votes	%
Democratic	Linda Coleman (incumbent)	11,737	58.73%
Republican	John W. Blackwell	8,246	41.27%
Total votes		19,983	100%
Democratic hold			

=== 2004 ===
North Carolina House of Representatives 39th district Democratic primary election, 2004
Party	Candidate	Votes	%
Democratic	Linda Coleman	2,242	60.43%
Democratic	Darren Jackson	1,468	39.57%
Total votes		3,710	100%

North Carolina House of Representatives 39th district general election, 2004
Party	Candidate	Votes	%
Democratic	Linda Coleman	18,480	54.40%
Republican	Sam Ellis (incumbent)	15,488	45.60%
Total votes		33,968	100%
Democratic gain from Republican			

=== 2002 ===
Wake County Board of Commissioners 1st district general election, 2002
Party	Candidate	Votes	%
Republican	Joe Bryan	110,355	51.55%
Democratic	Linda Coleman (incumbent)	97,198	45.40%
Libertarian	Steven Hilton	6,522	3.05%
Total votes		214,075	100%
Republican gain from Democratic			

=== 1998 ===
Wake County Board of Commissioners 1st district general election, 1998
Party	Candidate	Votes	%
Democratic	Linda Coleman	86,074	50.39%
Republican	Les Merritt (incumbent)	84,746	49.61%
Total votes		170,820	100%
Democratic gain from Republican			

Party political offices
Preceded by Walter Dalton	Democratic nominee for Lieutenant Governor of North Carolina; 2012, 2016	Succeeded by Yvonne Lewis Holley
North Carolina House of Representatives
Preceded by Sam Ellis	Member of the North Carolina House of Representatives from the 39th district 2005–2009	Succeeded by Darren Jackson
