= J. Sam Ellis =

American politician from North Carolina

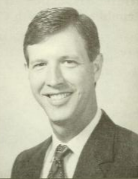
- Ellis in the 1999 legislative manual

Member of the North Carolina House of Representatives
- In office January 1, 1993 – January 1, 2005
- Preceded by: Constituency established
- Succeeded by: Linda Coleman
- Constituency: 15th District (1993-2003); 39th District (2003-2005)

Personal details
- Born: April 30, 1955 (age 71) Durham, North Carolina, U.S.
- Party: Republican

J. Sam Ellis (born April 30, 1955) is a Republican former member of the North Carolina General Assembly who represented the state's thirty-ninth House district, including constituents in Wake County. An electrical contractor from Raleigh, Ellis was defeated by Democrat Linda Coleman in the 2004 general election.

In 2002, incoming freshmen at the University of North Carolina were required to read "Approaching the Qur’an: The Early Revelations" by Michael Sells, a scholar of comparative religions at Haverford College. When they arrived on campus, they were to briefly discuss the book in small groups led by a member of the faculty. Ellis backed a campaign to remove the use of state funds from the book, stating "I don't want the students in the university system required to study this evil."

North Carolina House of Representatives
Preceded by Leo Mercer	Member of the North Carolina House of Representatives from the 15th district 1993–2003	Succeeded by Robert Grady
Preceded by Lyons Gray	Member of the North Carolina House of Representatives from the 39th district 2003–2005	Succeeded by Linda Coleman
