= 2012 North Carolina lieutenant gubernatorial election =

- November 6, 2012
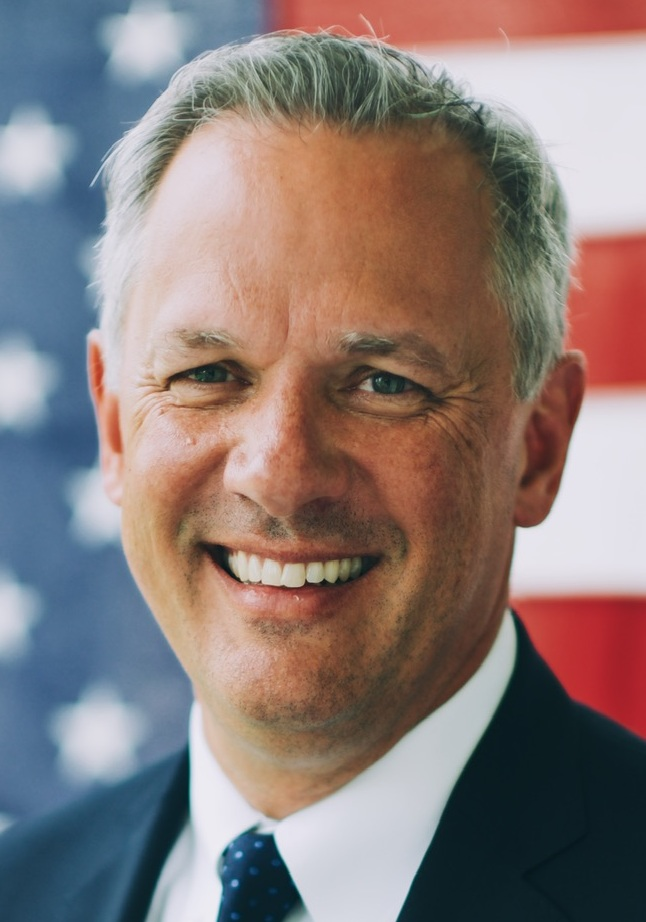

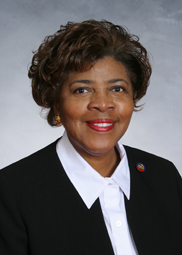
Nominee	Dan Forest	Linda Coleman
Party	Republican	Democratic
Popular vote	2,187,728	2,180,870
Percentage	50.1%	49.9%
- Forest: 50–60% 60–70% 70–80% Coleman: 50–60% 60–70% 70–80%
Lieutenant Governor before election
Walter Dalton
Democratic
Elected Lieutenant Governor
Dan Forest
Republican

The 2012 North Carolina lieutenant gubernatorial election was held on November 6, 2012, concurrently with the other elections to the Council of State and the gubernatorial election. Primary elections were held May 8. The offices of Governor and Lieutenant Governor are elected separately. The incumbent, Lieutenant Governor Walter Dalton, announced on January 26, 2012 that he would run for Governor.

In the general election, Republican Dan Forest won 50.08% of the vote, narrowly defeating Democrat Linda Coleman. The election result was in doubt for almost two weeks after Election Day, and was within the margin in which Coleman could ask for a recount, but she chose not to do so on November 19.

When he took office in January 2013, Forest became the state's first Republican lieutenant governor since Jim Gardner left office two decades earlier.

== Democratic primary ==
=== Candidates ===
==== Declared ====
- Linda Coleman, former state representative, state personnel director
- Eric L. Mansfield, state senator

==== Declined ====
- Cal Cunningham, former state senator
- Hampton Dellinger, attorney

=== Polling ===
Poll source	Date(s) administered	Sample size	Margin of error	Linda Coleman	Eric Mansfield	Undecided
Public Policy Polling	May 5–6, 2012	500	± 3.1%	41%	23%	36%
Survey USA	April 26–30, 2012	560	± 4.2%	41%	23%	36%
Public Policy Polling	April 27–29, 2012	500	± 4.4%	39%	18%	43%
Public Policy Polling	April 20–22, 2012	500	± 4.4%	28%	16%	56%
Public Policy Polling	March 23–25, 2012	505	± 4.36%	26%	14%	59%
Public Policy Polling	February 29 – March 1, 2012	499	± 4.4%	25%	15%	61%

=== Results ===
Primary results by county: Coleman: Coleman—71-80%; Coleman—61-70%; Coleman—51-60%; Mansfield: Mansfield—71-80%; Mansfield—61-70%; Mansfield—51-60%

Democratic primary results
Party	Candidate	Votes	%
Democratic	Linda Coleman	483,905	56.1
Democratic	Eric Mansfield	378,635	43.9
Total votes		862,540	100.0

== Republican primary ==
=== Candidates ===
Declared

- Dale Folwell, state representative, former Winston-Salem School Board member, accountant and investment advisor
- Dan Forest, architect, son of Congresswoman Sue Myrick
- Tony Gurley, Wake County Commissioner, pharmacist, ex-race car driver
- Grey Mills, state representative
- Arthur Rich, businessman

=== Polling ===
Poll source	Date(s) administered	Sample size	Margin of error	Dale Folwell	Dan Forest	Tony Gurley	Grey Mills	Arthur Rich	Undecided
Public Policy Polling	May 5–6, 2012	496	± 4.4%	22%	17%	18%	9%	2%	32%
Survey USA	April 26–30, 2012	451	± 4.7%	13%	17%	12%	11%	5%	41%
Public Policy Polling	April 27–29, 2012	486	± 4.4%	20%	15%	11%	10%	3%	40%
Public Policy Polling	April 20–22, 2012	521	± 4.3%	15%	12%	12%	8%	2%	51%

=== Results ===
Primary results by county: Forest: Forest—51-60%; Forest—41-50%; Forest—31-40%; Forest—21-30%; Gurley: Gurley—51-60%; Gurley—41-50%; Gurley—31-40%; Folwell: Folwell—51-60%; Folwell—41-50%; Folwell—31-40%; Folwell—21-30%; Mills: Mills—41-50%; Mills—31-40%; Mills—21-30%

Republican primary results
Party	Candidate	Votes	%
Republican	Dan Forest	251,885	32.9
Republican	Tony Gurley	189,954	24.9
Republican	Dale Folwell	185,535	24.3
Republican	Grey Mills	112,063	14.7
Republican	Arthur Jason Rich	25,015	3.3
Total votes		764,452	100.0

Under state law, if no candidate receives 40 percent of the vote in the primary, the second-place candidate can request a second primary (runoff). According to unofficial May 8 primary election results, Gurley came in second, and he announced that he would request such a runoff.

Republican 2nd primary results
Party	Candidate	Votes	%
Republican	Dan Forest	101,428	67.9
Republican	Tony Gurley	47,978	32.1
Total votes		149,406	100.0

== General election ==
=== Polling ===
Poll source	Date(s) administered	Sample size	Margin of error	Linda Coleman (D)	Dan Forest (R)	Undecided
Public Policy Polling	November 3–4, 2012	926	± 3.2%	44%	45%	11%
Public Policy Polling	October 29–31, 2012	730	± 3.6%	41%	43%	16%
Public Policy Polling	October 12–14, 2012	1,084	± 3%	37%	38%	26%
Civitas/National Research, Inc.	September 18–19, 2012	600	± 4%	43%	39%	18%
Public Policy Polling	August 31 – September 1, 2012	1,012	± 3.1%	41%	39%	20%
Public Policy Polling	August 2–5, 2012	813	± 3.4%	37%	38%	26%
Public Policy Polling	May 10–13, 2012	666	± 3.8%	41%	40%	20%

=== Results ===
General election results
Party	Candidate	Votes	%
Republican	Dan Forest	2,187,728	50.08%
Democratic	Linda Coleman	2,180,870	49.92%
Total votes		4,368,598	100.00%
Republican gain from Democratic			

==== By congressional district ====
Forest won ten of the state's 13 congressional districts, including one that elected a Democrat.

District	Forest	Coleman	Representative
1st	26%	74%	G. K. Butterfield
2nd	57%	43%	Renee Ellmers
3rd	56%	44%	Walter B. Jones Jr.
4th	28%	72%	David Price
5th	59%	41%	Virginia Foxx
6th	57%	43%	Howard Coble
7th	57%	43%	Mike McIntyre
8th	56%	44%	Larry Kissell
8th	56%	44%	Richard Hudson
9th	58%	42%	Sue Myrick
9th	58%	42%	Robert Pittenger
10th	58%	42%	Patrick McHenry
11th	60%	40%	Heath Shuler
11th	60%	40%	Mark Meadows
12th	21%	79%	Mel Watt
13th	56%	44%	Brad Miller
13th	56%	44%	George Holding
