= 2004 North Carolina gubernatorial election =

- November 2, 2004
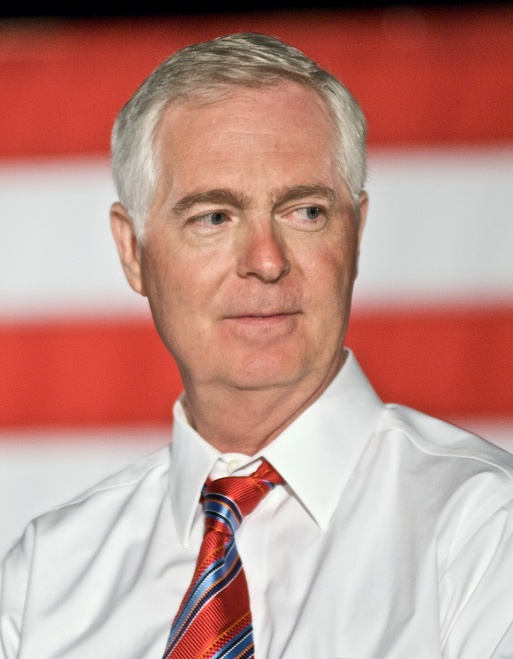

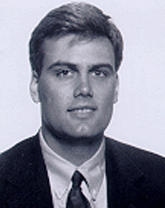
Nominee	Mike Easley	Patrick Ballantine
Party	Democratic	Republican
Popular vote	1,939,154	1,495,021
Percentage	55.62%	42.88%
- Easley: 40–50% 50–60% 60–70% 70–80% 80–90% >90% Ballantine: 40–50% 50–60% 60–70% 70–80% 80–90% Tie: 40–50%
Governor before election
Mike Easley
Democratic
Elected Governor
Mike Easley
Democratic

The 2004 North Carolina gubernatorial election was held on November 2, 2004. The general election was between the Democratic incumbent Mike Easley and the Republican nominee Patrick J. Ballantine. Easley won by 56% to 43%, winning his second term as governor.

== Primaries ==
=== Democratic ===
Mike Easley was first elected as governor in 2000 and opted to run for a second term. He faced opposition in the Democratic primary from Rickey Kipfer, a former corporate manager from Lee County. Kipfer campaigned on a platform of abolishing North Carolina's personal income tax and exploring potential natural gas resources in the state. He envisioned the state replacing income tax revenue with revenue from natural gas exploration. Kipfer also proposed a system similar to the Alaska Permanent Fund as a means of distributing potential natural gas revenues to citizens in North Carolina.

Easley's campaign manager stated that they did not consider Kipfer as serious competition. Easley did not campaign against Kipfer.

Mike Easley won the primary comfortably with over 85% of the vote.

==== Candidates ====
===== Declared =====
- Mike Easley, incumbent governor
- Rickey Kipfer, businessman

==== Results ====
2004 North Carolina gubernatorial Democratic primary election
Party	Candidate	Votes	%
Democratic	Mike Easley (incumbent)	379,498	85.37
Democratic	Rickey Kipfer	65,061	14.63
Turnout		444,559	100

=== Republican ===
==== Candidates ====
===== Declared =====
- Patrick J. Ballantine, Minority Leader of the North Carolina Senate (1999–2004)
- Dan Barett, attorney and Davie County Commissioner
- Bill Cobey, Chair of the North Carolina Republican Party (1999–2003) and U.S. Representative from NC-04 (1985–1987)
- George Little, insurance executive
- Fern Shubert, state senator (2003–2005)
- Richard Vinroot, Mayor of Charlotte (1991–1995), nominee for governor in 2000 and candidate for governor in 1996

===== Withdrawn =====
- Timothy Cook, chemist (running for lieutenant governor)

===== Declined =====
- James Cain, former president of the Carolina Hurricanes
- I. Beverly Lake Jr., Chief Justice of the North Carolina Supreme Court (2001–2006)

==== Results ====
Primary results by county: Ballantine: Ballantine—81-90%; Ballantine—71-80%; Ballantine—61-70%; Ballantine—51-60%; Ballantine—41-50%; Ballantine—31-40%; Ballantine—21-30%; Vinroot: Vinroot—41-50%; Vinroot—31-40%; Vinroot—21-30%; Cobey: Cobey—51-60%; Cobey—41-50%; Cobey—31-40%; Barrett: Barrett—51-60%; Barrett—21-30%; Shubert: Shubert—31-40%; Little: Little—51-60%

2004 North Carolina gubernatorial Republican primary election
Party	Candidate	Votes	%
Republican	Patrick J. Ballantine	110,726	30.38
Republican	Richard Vinroot	109,217	29.97
Republican	Bill Cobey	97,461	26.74
Republican	Dan Barrett	19,097	5.24
Republican	Fern Shubert	14,445	3.96
Republican	George Little	13,474	3.70
Turnout		364,420	100

== General election ==
=== Predictions ===
Source	Ranking	As of
Sabato's Crystal Ball	Likely D	November 1, 2004

=== Polling ===
Poll source	Date(s) administered	Sample size (Note: Key: A – all adults RV – registered voters LV – likely voters V – unclear)	Margin of error	Mike Easley (D)	Patrick Ballantine (R)	Other / Undecided
SurveyUSA	October 29–31, 2004	617 (LV)	± 4.0%	55%	41%	5%

=== Results ===
2004 North Carolina gubernatorial election
Party	Candidate	Votes	%	±%
Democratic	Mike Easley (incumbent)	1,939,154	55.62%	+3.60%
Republican	Patrick J. Ballantine	1,495,021	42.88%	−3.38%
Libertarian	Barbara Howe	52,513	1.51%	+0.06%
Turnout		3,486,688		
Democratic hold		Swing		

==== Counties that flipped from Republican to Democratic ====
- Cleveland (largest town: Shelby)
- Polk (Largest city: Tryon)
- Rutherford (Largest city: Forest City)
- Surry (Largest city: Mount Airy)
- Mecklenburg (Largest city: Charlotte)
- Alleghany (largest town: Sparta)

==== Counties that flipped from Democratic to Republican ====
- Currituck (largest town: Moyock)
- Johnston (largest town: Clayton)
