= Bill Cobey =

American politician

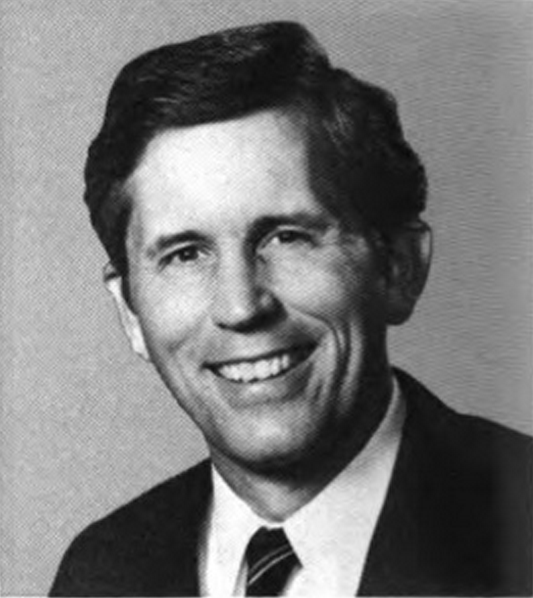

Chair of the North Carolina State Board of Education
- In office 2013–2018
- Preceded by: William C. Harrison
- Succeeded by: Eric Davis

Chair of the North Carolina Republican Party
- In office May 22, 1999 – July 21, 2003
- Preceded by: Sam Currin
- Succeeded by: Ferrell Blount

Secretary of the North Carolina Department of Environmental and Natural Resources
- In office 1989–1993
- Governor: James G. Martin
- Preceded by: Thomas Rhodes
- Succeeded by: Jonathan Howes

Member of the U.S. House of Representatives from North Carolina's 4th district
- In office January 3, 1985 – January 3, 1987
- Preceded by: Ike Franklin Andrews
- Succeeded by: David Price

Personal details
- Born: William Wilfred Cobey, Jr. May 13, 1939 (age 87) Washington, D.C., U.S.
- Party: Republican
- Education: Emory University (BA); University of Pennsylvania (MBA); University of Pittsburgh (MEd)

William Wilfred Cobey Jr. (born May 13, 1939) is an American politician. A member of the Republican Party, he served one term in the United States House of Representatives for North Carolina's 4th congressional district from 1985 to 1987.

== Biography ==
Cobey was born in Washington, D.C. and reared in the suburb of University Park in Prince George's County, Maryland. His father, William W. Cobey, Sr., was the athletic director for the University of Maryland from 1956 to 1969. Cobey is a graduate of Emory University in Atlanta, Georgia, where he received a Bachelor of Arts in Chemistry. Cobey also earned an M.B.A. in Marketing from the Wharton School at the University of Pennsylvania in Philadelphia and an M.Ed. from the University of Pittsburgh.

=== Early career ===
Cobey originally worked as a bank administrative assistant and then as a chemical salesman. In 1968, he became, like his father, an athletic administrator. From 1976 to 1980, he was athletic director at the University of North Carolina at Chapel Hill. In the early 1980s, he was the president of his own corporation, Cobey & Associates.

=== Congress ===
In 1980, Cobey was the Republican nominee for North Carolina Lieutenant Governor. In 1984, he was elected to represent North Carolina's 4th congressional district in the U.S. Congress. However, he was defeated in a bid for re-election in 1986 by the Democrat David Price.

== Later career ==
After serving in Congress, Cobey joined the administration of North Carolina Governor James G. Martin, first as Deputy Secretary of Transportation and then as Secretary of the Department of Environment, Health and Natural Resources. After serving as town manager of Morrisville, North Carolina, he did government relations consulting for Capitol Link, Inc.

Cobey served two terms (1999–2003) as the voluntary chairman of the North Carolina Republican Party. He replaced Sam Currin. Under Cobey's leadership, the state party purchased a new headquarters building. He was succeeded by Ferrell Blount as party chair.

Cobey was one of the leading candidates for the Republican gubernatorial nomination to challenge Democratic Governor Mike Easley in the 2004 election. In July 2003, Cobey received the endorsement of former North Carolina Senator Jesse Helms in the Republican primary contest. Rarely had Helms endorsed any candidate in primaries, other than Ronald W. Reagan for the 1976 presidential nomination. In the July 2004 Republican primary, Cobey ran a strong third with 26.7% of the vote (97,461 votes), lagging behind nominee Patrick Ballantine (30.3% and 110,726 votes) and Richard Vinroot (29.9% and 109,217 votes).

In 2007-2008, Cobey was the North Carolina campaign chairman for defeated presidential candidate Mike Huckabee, the former governor of Arkansas.

From 2005-2012, Cobey was a presidential-appointee to the Metropolitan Washington Airports Authority Board of Directions, which governs Reagan National and Dulles Airports. He is a former chairman of the board at Trinity School of Durham and Chapel Hill, a former board chairman of the Jesse Helms Foundation, and a former president of the Chapel Hill-Carrboro YMCA. From 2013-2018, he was chairman of the North Carolina State Board of Education, a board member for the NC Center for the Advancement of Teaching (NCCAT), a member of the NC Education Workforce Innovation Commission, and a member of the governor's education cabinet.

== Personal life ==
Cobey resides in Chapel Hill, North Carolina with his wife, Nancy. They have two children and five grandchildren.

Party political offices
Preceded by William S. Hiatt	Republican nominee for Lieutenant Governor of North Carolina; 1980	Succeeded by John H. Carrington
Preceded by Sam Currin	Chair of the North Carolina Republican Party; 1999–2003	Succeeded by Ferrell Blount
U.S. House of Representatives
Preceded by Ike Andrews	Member of the U.S. House of Representatives from North Carolina's 4th congressional district 1985–1987	Succeeded by David Price
U.S. order of precedence (ceremonial)
Preceded by Charles Robin Britt as Former U.S. Representative	Order of precedence of the United States as Former U.S. Representative	Succeeded by David Funderburk as Former U.S. Representative
