= 2000 North Carolina gubernatorial election =

- November 7, 2000
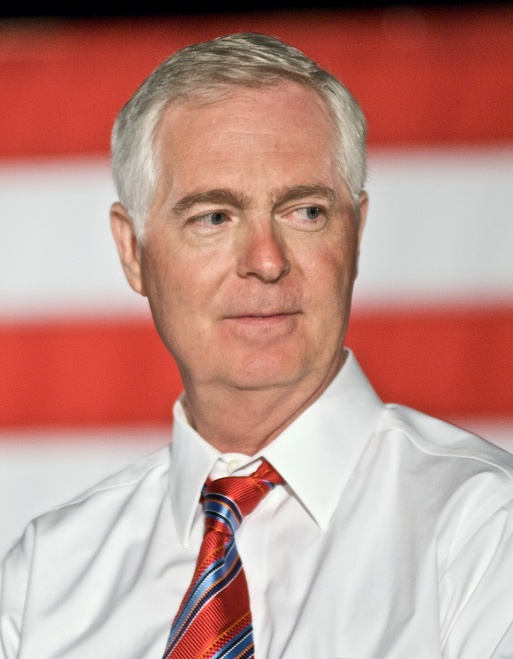

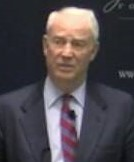
Nominee	Mike Easley	Richard Vinroot
Party	Democratic	Republican
Popular vote	1,530,324	1,360,960
Percentage	52.02%	46.26%
- County results Easley: 40–50% 50–60% 60–70% 70–80% Vinroot: 50–60% 60–70%
Governor before election
Jim Hunt
Democratic
Elected Governor
Mike Easley
Democratic

The 2000 North Carolina gubernatorial election was held on November 7, 2000. Democratic incumbent Jim Hunt was term-limited and constitutionally prohibited from seeking a third consecutive term in office. North Carolina attorney general Mike Easley easily defeated former Charlotte mayor Richard Vinroot in the open race.

Primary elections were held on May 2. Easley defeated lieutenant governor Dennis A. Wicker to win the Democratic nomination. Vinroot, who had unsuccessfully sought the Republican nomination in 1996, won a plurality of the vote over state representatives N. Leo Daughtry and Charles Neely.

This was the first North Carolina gubernatorial election since 1968 in which the winner was not named James.

== Democratic primary ==
=== Candidates ===
- Bob Ayers
- Mike Easley, North Carolina attorney general
- Ken Rogers
- Dennis Wicker, lieutenant governor of North Carolina

=== Results ===
Primary results by county: Easley: Easley—81-90%; Easley—71-80%; Easley—61-70%; Easley—51-60%; Easley—41-50%; Wicker: Wicker—71-80%; Wicker—51-60%; Wicker—41-50%

2000 Democratic gubernatorial primary
Party	Candidate	Votes	%
Democratic	Mike Easley	330,764	58.86%
Democratic	Dennis A. Wicker	203,723	36.25%
Democratic	Bob Ayers	9,224	1.64%
Democratic	Ken Rogers	7,998	1.42%
Total votes		561,940	100.00%

== Republican primary ==
=== Candidates ===
- Leo Daughtry, state representative from Smithfield
- Art Manning, candidate for governor in 1996
- Charles Neely, attorney and former state representative from Raleigh
- Richard Vinroot, former mayor of Charlotte and candidate for governor in 1996

=== Results ===
Primary results by county Vinroot: 30-40% 40-50% 50-60% 60-70% 70-80% Daughtry: 30-40% 40-50% 50-60% 60-70% 70-80% 80-90% Neely: 31-40% Daughtry/Neely tie: 31-40%

2000 Republican gubernatorial primary
Party	Candidate	Votes	%
Republican	Richard Vinroot	142,820	45.48%
Republican	N. Leo Daughtry	116,115	36.97%
Republican	Charles Neely	48,101	15.32%
Republican	Art Manning	7,019	2.23%
Total votes		314,055	100.00%

== General election ==
=== Candidates ===
- Mike Easley, North Carolina attorney general (Democratic)
- Barbara Howe (Libertarian)
- Douglas Schell (Reform)
- Richard Vinroot, former mayor of Charlotte and candidate for governor in 1996 (Republican)

=== Debates ===
- Complete video of debate, September 13, 2000
- Complete video of debate, October 27, 2000

=== Polling ===
Poll source	Date(s)	Sample size	Margin of error	Mike Easley (D)	Richard Vinroot (R)	Other / undecided (Note: Calculated by taking the difference of 100% and all other candidates combined.)
SurveyUSA	November 4, 2000	500	—	47%	46%	7%
Harris Insights & Analytics	November 3, 2000	6,696	—	53%	43%	4%
Rasmussen Reports	November 1, 2000	1,163	—	45%	43%	12%
Mason-Dixon Polling & Strategy	October 29, 2000	625	—	48%	41%	11%
SurveyUSA	October 29, 2000	500	—	46%	45%	9%

=== Results ===
2000 North Carolina gubernatorial election
Party	Candidate	Votes	%	±%
Democratic	Mike Easley	1,530,324	52.02%	−3.96
Republican	Richard Vinroot	1,360,960	46.26%	+3.51
Libertarian	Barbara Howe	42,674	1.45%	+0.77
Reform	Douglas Schell	8,104	0.28%	N/A
Turnout		2,942,062		
Democratic hold		Swing		

==== Counties that flipped from Democratic to Republican ====
- Alamance (largest municipality: Burlington)
- Onslow (largest town: Jacksonville)
- Polk (largest city: Tryon)
- Rutherford (largest city: Forest City)
- Surry (largest city: Mount Airy)
- Carteret (largest city: Morehead City)
- Mecklenburg (largest municipality: Charlotte)
