= George Little (North Carolina politician) =

American politician (1942–2024)

George W. Little (March 22, 1942 – October 11, 2024) was an American Republican politician from the state of North Carolina and was a candidate for North Carolina Governor in the 2004 gubernatorial election.

== Life and career ==
Born in Pinehurst, North Carolina, raised in Southern Pines, and an alumnus of the University of North Carolina at Chapel Hill, Little was an insurance executive. He was involved with the Republican party since the 1970s, having served on the gubernatorial campaigns of Jim Holshouser and Jim Martin, as well as chair of the Moore County Republican Party. During Jim Holshouser's tenure as governor, Little was appointed Secretary of Natural and Economic Resources.

Little served for years as chair of the Sandhills Community College Board of Trustees and campaigned for the successful 2000 North Carolina higher education bond measure. Little's work on the board of his local community college has been praised for being completely nonpartisan. Sandhills is considered one of the top community colleges in the country.

Little entered the race for the Republican nomination to challenge incumbent Democratic Governor Mike Easley in 2004. He had the support of both former governors Holshouser and Martin. The only one out of a field of six challengers who had not ever held elected office, Little's largely self-financed campaign earned him four percent of the popular vote but left him in last place out of the crowded primary field.

In 2009, he was considered a possible candidate for chairman of the North Carolina Republican Party but endorsed Tom Fetzer instead.

Little died on October 11, 2024, at the age of 82.
