= 2008 North Carolina gubernatorial election =

- November 4, 2008
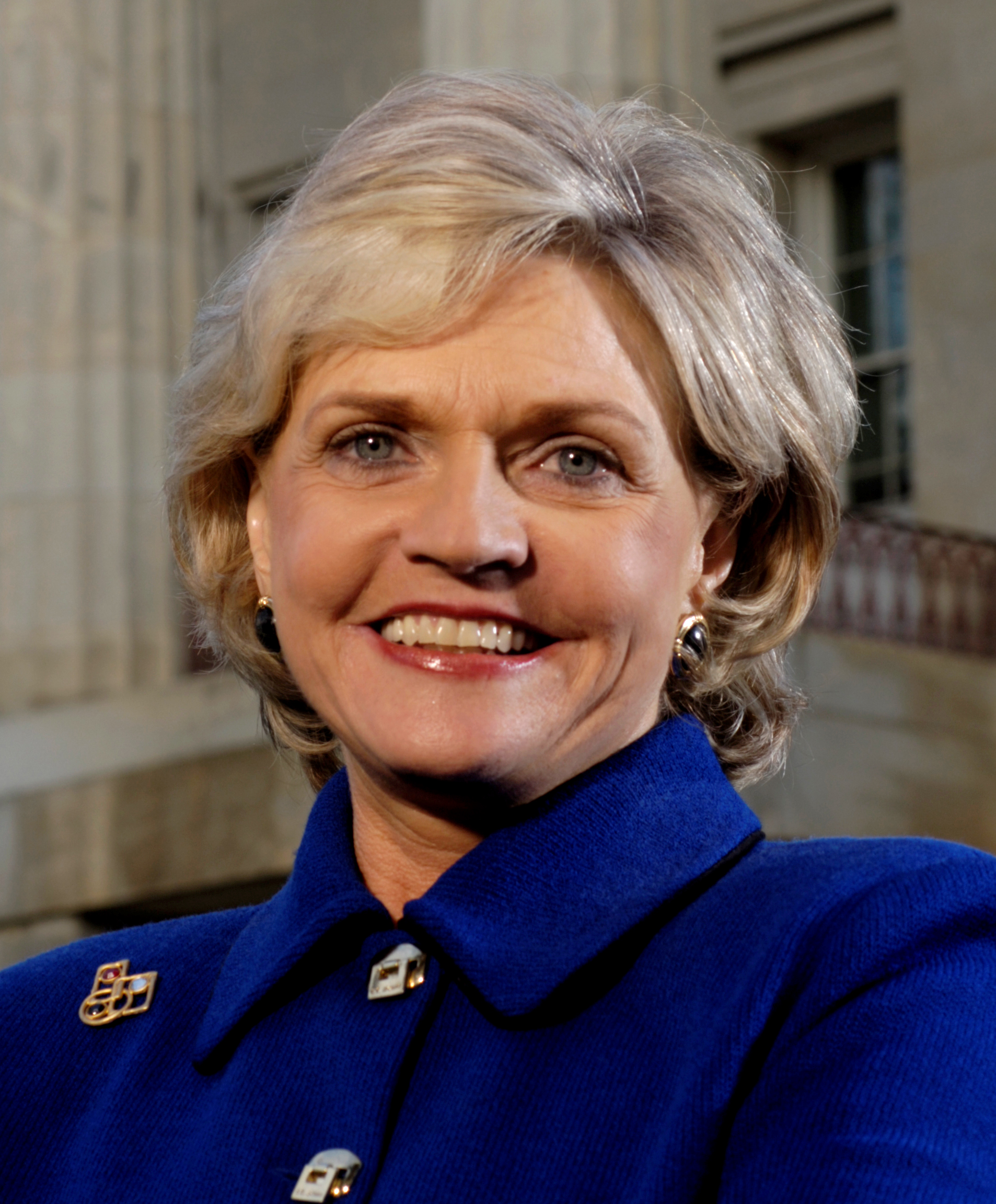

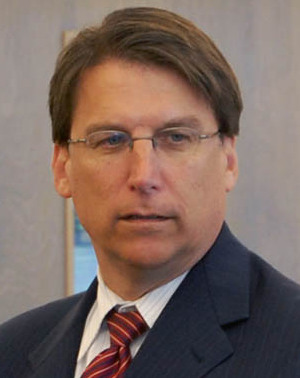
Nominee	Bev Perdue	Pat McCrory
Party	Democratic	Republican
Popular vote	2,146,189	2,001,168
Percentage	50.27%	46.88%
- Perdue: 40–50% 50–60% 60–70% 70–80% 80–90% >90% McCrory: 40–50% 50–60% 60–70% 70–80% 80–90% Tie: 40–50% 50%
Governor before election
Mike Easley
Democratic
Elected Governor
Bev Perdue
Democratic

The 2008 North Carolina gubernatorial election was held on November 4, 2008, coinciding with the presidential, U.S. Senate, U.S. House, Council of State and statewide judicial elections. Democrat Bev Perdue won the election. With a margin of 3.39%, this election was the closest race of the 2008 gubernatorial election cycle. This was the first time that the same party that was elected governor won the state in presidential election as well since 1988. This was the first time Democrats did so since 1976.

Because incumbent Governor Mike Easley was term-limited, the open-seat race was contested between Democrat Bev Perdue, Republican Pat McCrory, and Libertarian Michael Munger. Likewise, Democrat Walter Dalton, Republican Robert Pittenger, and Libertarian Phillip Rhodes vied to replace term-limited Lieutenant Governor Perdue.

== Primaries ==
- May 6, 2008 – Primary elections
- Oct. 10, 2008 – Last day to register to vote in general election
- Oct. 16 – Nov. 1, 2008 – "One Stop" registration and early voting
- November 4, 2008 – General election

Candidates Richard Moore, Dennis Nielsen, Robert Orr, and Bev Perdue took part in a forum on January 26, sponsored by the state chapter of the NAACP.

The statewide syndicated TV program NC Spin held debates for both parties' candidates in April.

=== Democratic ===
==== Candidates ====
- Richard Moore, state treasurer
- Dennis Nielsen, retired USAF colonel
- Bev Perdue, lieutenant governor of North Carolina

==== Campaign ====
Moore and Nielsen appeared on the edition of NC Spin broadcast April 13 on most stations, but Perdue declined the invitation to participate. Perdue and Moore met for their final pre-primary debate at WRAL-TV, which was broadcast on several stations across the state on April 22.

On May 6, 2008, Perdue won the Democratic nomination for governor, defeating State Treasurer Moore and Nielsen.

==== Results ====
Primary results by county: Perdue: Perdue—71-80%; Perdue—61-70%; Perdue—51-60%; Perdue—41-50%; Moore: Moore—61-70%; Moore—51-60%; Moore—41-50%

Democratic primary results
Party	Candidate	Votes	%
Democratic	Bev Perdue	840,342	56.21%
Democratic	Richard Moore	594,028	39.73%
Democratic	Dennis Nielsen	60,628	4.06%
Total votes		1,494,998	100.00%

=== Republican ===
==== Candidates ====
- Bill Graham, Salisbury attorney and head of conservative group
- Pat McCrory, mayor of Charlotte (re-elected in 2007)
- Bob Orr, former state Supreme Court associate justice
- Elbie Powers, farmer, crop duster, vice president of NC Pecan Growers Association
- Fred Smith, North Carolina state senator

==== Campaign ====
The Raleigh News & Observer reported on January 9, 2008, that McCrory had filed the necessary paperwork with the State Board of Elections to run for governor. He announced that he was running in his hometown of Jamestown on January 15, 2008.

==== Debates ====
Republican candidates Graham, Orr, and Smith held their first debate on October 20, 2007, at High Point University. The two Democratic candidates held their first debate at the annual conference of the N.C. School Boards Association on November 6, 2007, which hosted a Republican candidates' debate the same day.

UNC-TV invited the three announced Republican candidates and two announced Democratic candidates to participate in the campaign's first debates (officially called "forums") to air on statewide television. Each forum is intended to focus on a single topic: on Jan. 10, the state's economy; on February 7, health care; and on April 24, education. Video of the forums is available on the UNC-TV website.

The Republican candidates, now joined by new challenger Pat McCrory, debated on WRAL-TV on January 17. The debate was also broadcast on stations in Charlotte and Wilmington.

McCrory, Orr, Graham, and Smith met in a televised debate held by WTVI in Charlotte on April 3. Media accounts said that McCrory was the primary target of attacks by his rivals. The same was true at another WRAL-TV debate, held on April 15.

The final Republican debate before the primary was held in Asheville, and featured the only appearance by Elbie Powers in a debate.

==== Results ====
Primary results by county: McCrory: McCrory—71-80%; McCrory—61-70%; McCrory—51-60%; McCrory—41-50%; McCrory—31-40%; Smith: Smith—71-80%; Smith—61-70%; Smith—51-60%; Smith—41-50%; Smith—31-40%; Orr: Orr—41-50%

Republican primary results
Party	Candidate	Votes	%
Republican	Pat McCrory	232,818	46.11%
Republican	Fred Smith	186,843	37.00%
Republican	Bill Graham	46,861	9.28%
Republican	Bob Orr	34,007	6.73%
Republican	E. Powers	4,444	0.88%
Total votes		504,973	100.00%

== General election ==
=== Candidates ===
- Pat McCrory (Republican)
- Michael Munger (Libertarian)
- Bev Perdue (Democratic)

If he had been elected, McCrory would have been the first mayor of Charlotte to win the state's highest office.

=== Predictions ===
Source	Ranking	As of
The Cook Political Report	Toss Up	October 16, 2008
Rothenberg Political Report	Tossup	November 2, 2008
Sabato's Crystal Ball	Lean D	November 3, 2008
Real Clear Politics	Tossup	November 4, 2008

=== Polling ===
Despite a "national Democratic tide" and Perdue's fundraising edge, McCrory led Perdue at first; Perdue slowly gained with help from Barack Obama as the Democratic presidential candidate. Perdue and McCrory remained close, with the two often polling in a statistical tie in what was the closest race for governor in the nation. Perdue ran slightly behind her opponent in polls released the week before the election. Pundits speculated that Perdue was hurt by current Democratic Governor Mike Easley's decreasing popularity due to the aftermath of the 2008 financial crisis, and McCrory's efforts to tag her as part of corruption in Raleigh—consultants mentioned Perdue's "difficulty of being the candidate of continuity in a change election."

Poll source	Date(s) administered	Sample size	Margin of error	Bev Perdue (D)	Pat McCrory (R)	Michael Munger (L)	Undecided
Public Policy Polling	October 31 – November 2, 2008	2,100 (LV)	± 2.1%	49%	48%	2%	1%
Public Policy Polling	October 18–19, 2008	1,200 (LV)	± 2.8%	48%	44%	4%	5%
Public Policy Polling	October 11–12, 2008	1,196 (LV)	± 2.8%	45%	44%	4%	7%
Public Policy Polling	October 4–5, 2008	1,202 (LV)	± 2.8%	46%	43%	4%	7%
Public Policy Polling	October 4–5, 2008	1,041 (LV)	± 3.0%	41%	44%	5%	10%
Public Policy Polling	September 17–19, 2008	1,060 (LV)	± 3.0%	44%	43%	6%	7%
Public Policy Polling	August 20–23, 2008	904 (LV)	± 3.3%	43%	38%	4%	15%
Public Policy Polling	July 23–27, 2008	823 (LV)	± 3.4%	46%	37%	6%	11%
Public Policy Polling	June 26–29, 2008	1,048 (LV)	± 3.0%	42%	41%	5%	12%
Public Policy Polling	May 28–29, 2008	543 (LV)	± 4.2%	43%	39%	4%	14%
Public Policy Polling	May 8–9, 2008	616 (LV)	± 4.0%	45%	45%	-	9%
Public Policy Polling	February 18, 2008	720 (LV)	± 3.7%	41%	41%	-	18%
Public Policy Polling	January 21, 2008	809 (LV)	± 3.4%	41%	39%	-	20%
Public Policy Polling	December 12, 2007	457 (LV)	± 4.5%	41%	39%	-	20%

=== Campaign ===
Early in 2008, Libertarian nominee Munger called Perdue a "Stepford Wife" and said the Republican nominees were "circus clowns." Prior to May 2008, the North Carolina Libertarian Party and Munger gathered 100,000 signatures of voters in order to qualify to appear on North Carolina's ballot. They, along with the Green Party, sued the state unsuccessfully over the ballot access rules. Munger appeared as one of two keynote speakers at the national Libertarian convention in Denver in May 2008.

When Hillary Clinton dropped out of the 2008 presidential election The New York Times mentioned Perdue as a potential pick for Obama's vice president.

Munger called himself "the only liberal in the race." Munger took more socially liberal positions on many issues than Democratic candidate Perdue. "One reason I haven't been allowed in all the debates is that I'm taking votes from the Democrats. Sixty percent of my supporters are voting for Obama. I'll talk about gay marriage, and Perdue isn't, or doesn't want to." While Democratic candidate Perdue took a hard line on illegal immigration similar to that of Republican Pat McCrory, Munger took a position more aligned with Barack Obama.

Perdue raised $15 million and ran attack ads against McCrory, criticizing him for not being tough enough on illegal immigration.

In October 2008, McCrory received the endorsement of most major newspapers in the state, which typically endorse Democrats. McCrory's candidacy for governor was endorsed by the Raleigh News and Observer, The Charlotte Observer, the Greensboro News & Record, the Winston-Salem Journal, and the UNC-Chapel Hill Daily Tar Heel.

Perdue received the endorsement of actor and director Andy Griffith, who filmed a campaign ad on her behalf.

Perdue defeated McCrory and Munger on November 4, 2008, to win the election.

=== Debates ===
The first general election debate between Perdue and McCrory was a forum at the North Carolina Bar Association meeting in Atlantic Beach on June 21. The first debate between the two that was televised live was conducted by WTVD on August 19. Another televised debate was held by WRAL-TV on September 9. Next, McCrory and Perdue met for a debate on education issues at SAS Institute on September 19. The debate was sponsored by business and education groups and was covered by News 14 Carolina.

Duke University professor and Libertarian candidate Michael Munger made history as the first third-party candidate to participate in a live, televised gubernatorial debate in North Carolina. He made his first debate appearance with McCrory on September 24 at UNC-TV. Perdue declined to participate in that debate. All three candidates debated for the first time on October 15, in the final debate before the general election. The hour-long debate, sponsored by WTVI, WSOC-TV and the League of Women Voters, aired in several television markets.

Analysts said that McCrory tended to perform better than Perdue in the debates, particularly in "sit-down debates that allowed more back-and-forth between the candidates."

=== Results ===
North Carolina gubernatorial election, 2008
Party	Candidate	Votes	%	±%
Democratic	Bev Perdue	2,146,189	50.27%	−5.34%
Republican	Pat McCrory	2,001,168	46.88%	+4.00%
Libertarian	Michael Munger	121,584	2.85%	+1.34%
Majority		145,021	3.40%	−9.34%
Turnout		4,268,941	100.00%	N/A
Democratic hold				

==== Counties that flipped from Republican to Democratic ====
- Onslow (largest town: Jacksonville)

==== Counties that flipped from Democratic to Republican ====
- Alamance (largest municipality: Burlington)
- Ashe (largest city: Jefferson)
- Brunswick (largest municipality: Leland)
- Camden (largest city: Camden)
- Cleveland (largest town: Shelby)
- Harnett (largest city: Anderson Creek)
- Pender (largest municipality: Hampstead)
- Polk (largest city: Tryon)
- Rutherford (largest city: Forest City)
- Surry (largest city: Mount Airy)
- Transylvania (largest city: Brevard)

== See also ==
- 2004 North Carolina gubernatorial election
