= Robin Hayes =

American politician (born 1945)

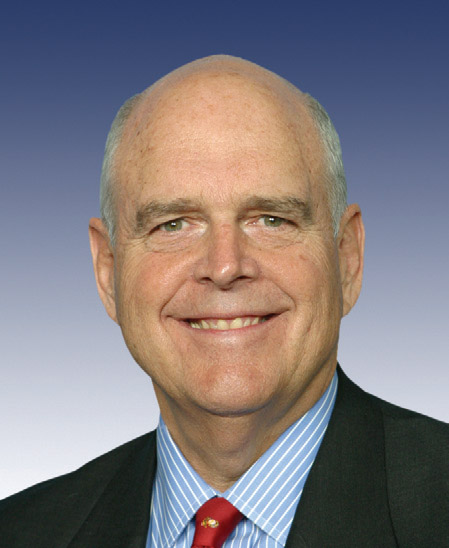

Chair of the North Carolina Republican Party
- In office April 30, 2016 – June 8, 2019; On leave: April 3, 2019 – June 8, 2019*
- Preceded by: Hasan Harnett
- Succeeded by: Michael Whatley
- In office January 15, 2011 – June 8, 2013
- Preceded by: Tom Fetzer
- Succeeded by: Claude Pope

Member of the U.S. House of Representatives from North Carolina's 8th district
- In office January 3, 1999 – January 3, 2009
- Preceded by: Bill Hefner
- Succeeded by: Larry Kissell

Member of the North Carolina House of Representatives from the 90th district
- In office January 1, 1993 – January 1, 1997
- Preceded by: Constituency established
- Succeeded by: Richard Lee Moore

Personal details
- Born: Robert Cannon Hayes; August 14, 1945 (age 81) Concord, North Carolina, U.S.
- Party: Republican
- Spouse: Barbara Hayes
- Education: Duke University (BA)
- * Aubrey Woodard served as acting chair during Hayes's leave.

Robert Cannon "Robin" Hayes (born August 14, 1945) is an American politician and businessman from North Carolina. A member of the Republican Party, he represented North Carolina's 8th congressional district in the House of Representatives from 1999 to 2009, and was the Republican nominee for Governor of North Carolina in 1996. Hayes served as chairman of the North Carolina Republican Party from 2011 to 2013, and from 2016 to 2019. Accused in a bribery scheme in 2019, Hayes pleaded guilty to lying to the FBI. On January 20, 2021, Hayes was pardoned by President Donald Trump.

== Early life, education, and early political career ==
Hayes was born in Concord, North Carolina, to Mariam Winslow (née Cannon) and Robert Griffith Hayes Jr. His great-grandfather James William Cannon founded the Cannon Mills Corporation, a Kannapolis-based textile company that was later run by his grandfather Charles Albert Cannon. He is also a descendant of Abraham Owen, a military officer killed at the Battle of Tippecanoe.

Hayes graduated from Duke University. He was elected to the Concord city council in 1978 and to the North Carolina House of Representatives in 1992 where he served two terms. He was the Republican nominee for governor in 1996, but was handily defeated by Democratic incumbent Jim Hunt. Hayes owns a hosiery mill in Mount Pleasant, North Carolina.

== U.S. House of Representatives ==
=== Elections ===
1998–2000

Hayes ran for Congress in 1998 after 12-term incumbent Democrat Bill Hefner announced his retirement. He narrowly defeated Democrat Mike Taylor, winning 51%–48% with a gap of only 3,400 votes. In 2000, he defeated Taylor in a rematch 55%–44%.

2002–2004

Even though a large chunk of its population is located in the conservative-leaning eastern suburbs of Charlotte, the 8th has long been considered marginally Democratic due to a strong Democratic presence in the eastern portion of the district closer to Fayetteville. After the 2000 Census, the Democratic-controlled North Carolina General Assembly made the 8th considerably more Democratic than before. It shifted the heavily Republican western portion of Union County to the Charlotte-based 9th District. In its place, it added a heavily Democratic tendril in Mecklenburg County to the 8th, stretching from the far northeastern portion of Charlotte almost to Matthews.

In 2002, he defeated Democrat Chris Kouri 54%–45%. In 2004, he defeated Democrat Beth Troutman 56%–45%.

2006

In 2006, however, Hayes was nearly defeated by Democrat Larry Kissell, a social studies teacher and former textile worker from Montgomery County. Each man won approximately 50% of the vote, making it one of the closest elections in the country. At the end, Kissell conceded defeat to Hayes after a recount; Hayes officially won the election by 329 votes. This was especially stunning since Kissell received little help from his national party until late in the campaign. Although Hayes only won three of the district's nine counties, a 6,100-vote margin in his native Cabarrus County was enough to keep him in office.

2008

In 2008, Hayes again faced Kissell. CQ Politics rated it as 'No Clear Favorite', The Rothenberg Political Report as 'Toss-Up/Tilt Democratic', and The Cook Political Report as 'Republican Toss Up'

The Sunlight Foundation reported that as of 2008, among the 435 members of the U.S. House of Representatives, Hayes had the highest amount of investment in oil stocks.

Hayes came under fire late in the campaign for his comments at a rally for John McCain. On October 18, 2008, at a McCain rally, Hayes began his remarks by saying it was important to "make sure we don't say something stupid, make sure we don't say something we don't mean." He then accused Obama of "inciting class warfare" and said that "liberals hate real Americans that work and accomplish and achieve and believe in God." Hayes repeatedly denied that he had made the statement and accused reporters of "irresponsible journalism", until an audio recording attesting to the statement was released. A few days later at a debate hosted by the Concord and Kannapolis Independent Tribune, Hayes denied that he denied the statement, saying he was denying only the context of how the remarks were presented to him.

Kissel defeated him 55%–45%.

=== Tenure ===
Hayes is a staunch advocate of a federal prohibition of online poker. In 2006, he cosponsored H.R. 4777, the Internet Gambling Prohibition Act.

CAFTA and Trade Act

Hayes vacillated on the Central American Free Trade Agreement, which came before the House in 2005. In the weeks before the vote, Hayes stated that he was "flat-out, completely, horizontally opposed to CAFTA" because he felt it would cause further loss of textile industry jobs in his district. Hayes first voted "no" but changed to "yes" at the last minute after he was lobbied by Republican House leadership (specifically House Speaker Dennis Hastert) and textile executives, who favored CAFTA. Hayes said that he had won concessions from the George W. Bush administration on certain textile issues. The final tally was 217–215 with Hayes casting the deciding "yes" vote (a tie would have defeated the motion).

Hayes played a similar role in the passage of the Trade Act of 2002, which shifted some trade agreement authority from Congress to the President. Though Hayes had said "We're a definite 'no' until we get some help on textiles," he was lobbied hard by the White House and congressional leadership to vote for the measure. Hayes waited until the last minute before voting "yes," and broke down in tears on the floor of the House.

NASCAR vaccine scare

In October 2007, it was revealed that House Homeland Security officials were "advised" to take vaccines before attending a NASCAR race in Concord, North Carolina. Hayes "took umbrage" when he heard about it and immediately defended the Charlotte Motor Speedway in his district and NASCAR fans nationwide. The uproar lasted for days and was covered on all major news outlets.

=== Committee assignments ===
- Agriculture Committee
  - Subcommittee on Conservation, Credit, Energy, and Research
  - Subcommittee on Livestock, Dairy, and Poultry (Ranking Member)
  - Subcommittee on Specialty Crops, Rural Development and Foreign Agriculture
- Armed Services Committee
  - Readiness Subcommittee
  - Terrorism and Unconventional Threats and Capabilities Subcommittee
- Transportation and Infrastructure Committee
  - Subcommittee on Aviation
  - Subcommittee on Highways and Transit
  - Subcommittee on Water Resources and Environment
- Assistant Whip
- Founding Co-chairman of the Special Operations Forces Caucus
- Co-chairman of the Philanthropy Caucus

== North Carolina Republican Party chairmanship ==
On January 15, 2011, Hayes was elected chairman of the North Carolina Republican Party. He completed the term of former Raleigh mayor Tom Fetzer, who decided to leave the post before his term expired. Hayes then served a full two-year term, and after the Republicans' successful 2012 election, he chose not to run for another term in 2013. In 2016, state Republicans removed their chairman, Hasan Harnett, and elected Hayes to return to the position.

=== Bribery charge ===
On March 18, 2019, a federal grand jury in the Western District of North Carolina indicted Hayes on charges of conspiracy to commit honest services fraud, wire fraud, bribery, and three counts of making false statements to federal authorities. According to the indictment, Hayes coordinated with businessman Greg Lindberg and two other individuals in an attempt to bribe Mike Causey, the North Carolina Commissioner of Insurance, in exchange for favorable treatment of Lindberg's insurance firm and the dismissal of a deputy insurance commissioner. Lindberg was found guilty and sentenced to seven years in prison.

The indictment remained sealed until April 2, when Hayes appeared in court to plead not guilty. The following day he said that he would let other Republicans assume responsibility for managing the North Carolina Republican Party until its officer elections in June. Hayes kept the title of chairman until the new elections. At their annual convention in June, North Carolina Republican Party members elected a new chairman, Michael Whatley. Hayes pleaded guilty to lying to the Federal Bureau of Investigation on October 2, 2019. President Donald Trump pardoned him on January 20, 2021.

Party political offices
Preceded by Jim Gardner	Republican nominee for Governor of North Carolina; 1996	Succeeded by Richard Vinroot
Preceded by Tom Fetzer	Chair of the North Carolina Republican Party; 2011–2013	Succeeded by Claude Pope
Preceded by Hasan Harnett	Chair of the North Carolina Republican Party; 2016–2019	Succeeded by Aubrey Woodard; Acting
U.S. House of Representatives
Preceded by Bill Hefner	Member of the U.S. House of Representatives from North Carolina's 8th congressional district 1999–2009	Succeeded by Larry Kissell
U.S. order of precedence (ceremonial)
Preceded by Eva Clayton as Former U.S. Representative	Order of precedence of the United States as Former U.S. Representative	Succeeded by Brad Miller as Former U.S. Representative
