= Charles Neely =

American politician

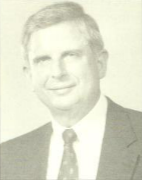
- Neely in the 1999 legislative manual

Member of the North Carolina House of Representatives from the 61st district
- In office January 1, 1995 – April 7, 1999
- Preceded by: Brad Miller
- Succeeded by: Art Pope

Personal details
- Born: Charles Batcheller Neely Jr. December 11, 1943 (age 82) Butler, New Jersey, U.S.
- Party: Republican
- Spouse: Laura
- Children: 1
- Education: University of North Carolina, Chapel Hill (BA); Duke University (JD)

Charles Batcheller Neely Jr. (born December 11, 1943) is an American former politician. He was a Republican member of the North Carolina General Assembly representing the State's 61st House district.

== Career ==
In 1994, Neely was elected to the North Carolina House of Representatives. He was reelected in 1996 and 1998. He resigned from the State House on April 7, 1999. He ran for Governor of North Carolina in 2000, but came third in the Republican primary.

North Carolina House of Representatives
Preceded by Brad Miller	Member of the North Carolina House of Representatives from the 61st district 1995–1999	Succeeded by Art Pope
