= Pat McCrory =

Governor of North Carolina from 2013 to 2017

- McCrory in 2014

74th Governor of North Carolina
- In office January 5, 2013 – January 1, 2017
- Lieutenant: Dan Forest
- Preceded by: Bev Perdue
- Succeeded by: Roy Cooper

53rd Mayor of Charlotte
- In office December 7, 1995 – December 7, 2009
- Preceded by: Richard Vinroot
- Succeeded by: Anthony Foxx

Personal details
- Born: Patrick Lloyd McCrory; October 17, 1956 (age 70) Columbus, Ohio, U.S.
- Party: Republican
- Spouse: Ann Sturgis (m. 1988)
- Education: Catawba College (BA)

Patrick Lloyd McCrory (born October 17, 1956) is an American politician and businessman who served as the 74th governor of North Carolina from 2013 to 2017. A member of the Republican Party, he previously served as the 53rd mayor of Charlotte from 1995 to 2009. To date, he is North Carolina's most recent Republican governor, and the last Republican mayor of Charlotte.

While serving as mayor of Charlotte, McCrory served on the U.S. Homeland Security Advisory Council from 2002 to 2006 under President George W. Bush. He was the Republican nominee for governor of North Carolina in the 2008 general election and was defeated by Lieutenant Governor Bev Perdue, the Democratic nominee. McCrory was again the Republican nominee in the 2012 gubernatorial election and won with 55 percent of the vote. McCrory became the first Mayor of Charlotte to win the state's highest office, as well as the first Republican to win the governorship of North Carolina since 1988.

In 2016, McCrory came to national attention after signing the Public Facilities Privacy & Security Act ("HB2"), sometimes called the transgender bathroom bill. Among other provisions, HB2 prevented local governing bodies from establishing their own anti-discrimination statutes. It declared that in government buildings, individuals may use only the restrooms that correspond to the sex on their birth certificates, preventing transgender people who have not altered their birth certificates from using the restroom consistent with their gender identity. The United States Department of Justice, in addition to several private citizens, filed lawsuits against McCrory and the state regarding HB2. Over 100 corporations voiced their opposition to HB2, notably to the elements that limited protections for LGBT individuals. In 2017, economists estimated that HB2 had negatively impacted GDP in the state of North Carolina by an amount between $450 and $630 million, or 0.1% of the state's annual gross domestic product. HB2 was partially repealed on March 30, 2017, after McCrory's reelection loss in 2016.

McCrory lost his bid for a second term as North Carolina's governor in the 2016 gubernatorial election, conceding to Democrat Roy Cooper a month after the election but continuing to make voter fraud allegations. Court injunctions blocked his attempts to limit Cooper's power during a lame-duck special session. In 2022, McCrory ran for the U.S. Senate and lost the Republican primary to U.S. Representative Ted Budd.

McCrory refused to endorse Donald Trump in 2024, although he endorsed him in 2016.

== Early life, education and business career ==
McCrory was born in Columbus, Ohio, the son of Audrey Mona (née Herzberg) and Rollin John McCrory. His family moved to North Carolina when he was a child. He was raised Presbyterian and his family attended First Presbyterian Church of Greensboro. He graduated in 1974 from Ragsdale High School in Jamestown, North Carolina. He attended Catawba College in Salisbury, North Carolina, where he received degrees in political science and education in 1978. McCrory was active in the Student Government Association and was part of a conservative backlash to the growing "hippie" culture at Catawba in the mid-1970s. He married Ann Sturgis in 1988.

In 2001, McCrory gave the graduation keynote address at his alma mater, Catawba College. The college awarded him an honorary doctorate of legal letters. He has served as a member of Catawba College's board of trustees.

In January 2008, after 28 years with Duke Energy, he retired from the company to run full-time for governor. In January 2009, McCrory was named a partner with Charlotte-based McCrory & Company, a sales consulting firm. In January 2010, he was named a Senior Director of Strategic Initiatives for Charlotte-based law firm Moore & Van Allen PLLC. He is a 2014 Young Leader Alumni member of the American Swiss Foundation.

Since 2017, he has hosted the "Pat McCrory Show with Bo Thompson" on WBT 1110AM in Charlotte, NC.

== Charlotte City Council (1989–1995) ==
McCrory began his political career in Charlotte in 1989 when he was elected an At-Large City Councilman. He was re-elected in 1991 and 1993; McCrory served as Mayor Pro Tem from 1993 to 1995. During his time on the council, he pushed for a teen curfew in response to rising crime, which the City Council ultimately adopted in February 1995.

== Mayor of Charlotte (1995–2009) ==
In 1995, he was elected mayor of the city of Charlotte, succeeding Richard Vinroot, who ran unsuccessfully for the 1996 Republican gubernatorial nomination. At the age of 39, McCrory was the city's youngest mayor. McCrory gained a reputation as a popular, affable mayor. In the 2007 mayoral election, he defeated seven-term Democratic state Rep. Beverly Earle, 61 to 39 percent.

McCrory announced in late 2008, shortly after his gubernatorial campaign, that he would not seek an eighth term. McCrory is the city of Charlotte's longest-serving mayor.

=== Transportation ===
McCrory helped develop Charlotte's 25-year transportation and land-use plan. Working closely with U.S. Senator Jesse Helms, McCrory made efforts to secure $200 million in federal funds for the city's new Lynx Light Rail system. The plan helped expand bus service in Charlotte as well as bringing light rail to the city. The light-rail line has been cited as McCrory's biggest achievement as mayor.

=== Economy ===
During McCrory's tenure (1995–2009), Charlotte's population grew by 20%, and the population of Uptown Charlotte increased to over 13,000 people. McCrory led the effort to recruit such companies as TIAA-CREF, General Dynamics Armament, The Westin Hotel, and Johnson & Wales University. The Charlotte Arena and the U.S. Whitewater Center were opened during his term. In 2005, Money magazine listed Charlotte in its Top 3 Best Places to Live and Reader's Digest named it one of the 20 Cleanest Cities in America.

=== National involvement and Homeland Security ===
McCrory has also been involved in many national organizations, having served as president of the Republican Mayors and Local Officials (RMLO) organization; chairman of the U.S. Conference of Mayors (USCM) Committee for Housing and Community Development; six-term Chair of the USCM Environmental Committee; and founder and inaugural chairman of the North Carolina Metropolitan Coalition. McCrory was also the only elected official to serve on the national board of the Afterschool Alliance and was a featured Mayor in Harvard University's Faith-based Executive Session.

In 2002, President George W. Bush appointed McCrory to the U.S. Homeland Security Advisory Council alongside Mitt Romney, Sonny Perdue and Lee H. Hamilton.

=== NASCAR Hall of Fame ===
As mayor, McCrory spearheaded the effort with local business leaders, local officials, and NASCAR teams to bring the NASCAR Hall of Fame to Charlotte. On March 6, 2006, Charlotte beat out Atlanta, Daytona Beach, Kansas City, and Richmond, Virginia, to be home to the Hall of Fame.

=== Awards and local involvement ===
McCrory established a Residential Tree Ordinance in 2004, which required developers to save 10% of the trees in every new residential development. He also established a Sidewalk Policy, which required sidewalks in every new subdivision and provided funding for sidewalks in neighborhoods without them, in order to encourage walking. He also worked to integrate bike lanes into the city's transportation policy, establishing 42 miles of bike lanes throughout the city.

In 2003, McCrory received the national Homeownership Hero Award, recognizing his work in leading Charlotte to have one of the highest homeownership rates in the country.

McCrory founded the Mayor's Mentoring Alliance in 1995 and has personally served as a mentor to two youths. In 2005, Charlotte was named as one of the '100 Best Communities for Youth' by America's Promise. The Mayor's Mentoring Alliance has grown to include 40 youth-serving and mentoring organizations, among them Time Warner Cable's "Time To Read" program. An additional partnership with the Charlotte-Mecklenburg Police Department initiated "Gang of One," an after-school gang-prevention and intervention program that works to keep children from joining gangs or helps lead them away from gang life.

McCrory has served as the honorary chair for the Charlotte chapter of the Alzheimer's Foundation and the Arthritis Foundation.

== 2008 gubernatorial campaign ==
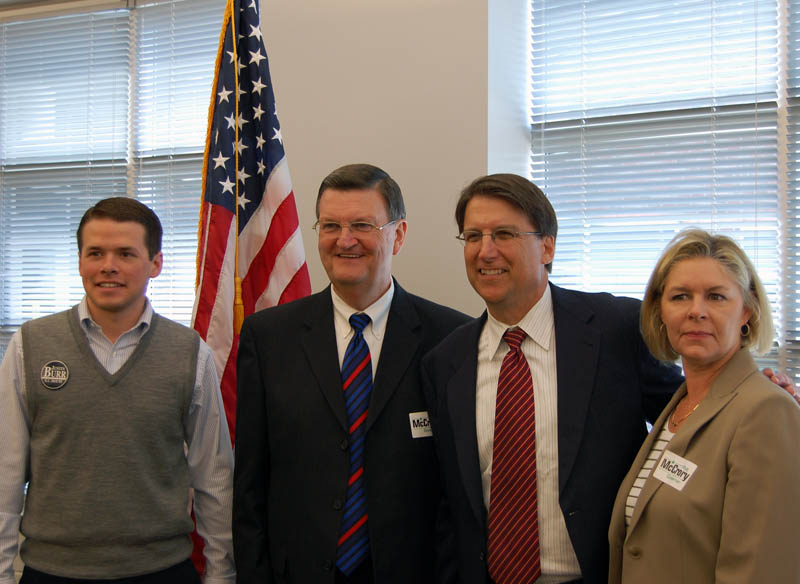
McCrory campaigning in 2008

McCrory reportedly commissioned a poll to test the waters for a run for governor in November 2007, shortly after his seventh mayoral re-election victory, but well after other Republican gubernatorial candidates had begun campaigning. A 2007 Rasmussen Reports poll had McCrory leading both major Democratic candidates, Bev Perdue and Richard H. Moore, by three points each.

The Raleigh News & Observer reported on January 9, 2008, that McCrory had filed the necessary paperwork with the State Board of Elections to run for governor. He announced his candidacy in his hometown of Jamestown on January 15, 2008.

In the primary election on May 6, 2008, McCrory defeated four opponents, including State Senator Fred Smith, to win the Republican nomination for governor. During the primary, McCrory was criticized for lacking conservative credentials and for the high taxes and large debt accrued in Charlotte while he was mayor. McCrory countered with negative ads against his foremost opponent, Sen. Fred Smith, inaccurately accusing Smith of running up state debt while in the legislature.

In the general election, Democratic lieutenant governor Bev Perdue raised $5.6 million and ran attack ads against McCrory, criticizing him on various issues. McCrory later referred to the ads as "shameless, inaccurate, and negative". Perdue and McCrory remained closely competitive, with the two often polling in a statistical tie in what was the tightest race for governor in the nation. The McCrory campaign spent $3.4 million, and an independent expenditure funded by the Republican Governor's association assisted McCrory with a further $6.2 million in spending for attack ads on Perdue. Perdue ran slightly behind her opponent in polls released the week before the election. Pundits speculated that Perdue was hurt by belonging to the same party as the increasingly unpopular incumbent Governor Mike Easley, and by McCrory's efforts to tag her as part of corruption in Raleigh. Consultants also mentioned Perdue's "difficulty of being the candidate of continuity in a change election."

In October 2008, McCrory received the endorsement of most major newspapers in the state, which typically endorse Democrats. McCrory's candidacy for governor was endorsed by the Raleigh News and Observer, the Charlotte Observer, the Greensboro News & Record, the Winston-Salem Journal, and the UNC-Chapel Hill Daily Tar Heel.

Even so, Perdue squeaked out a win by 145,021 votes, in what turned out to be the closest gubernatorial election in the United States in 2008. McCrory failed to win even in Charlotte, where he had been mayor for 14 years.

== Hiatus (2009–2012) ==
Following his defeat in the 2008 gubernatorial election, McCrory announced that he would not seek a record eighth term as Charlotte mayor in 2009. Having retired from Duke Energy after 29 years of service in early 2008 to run for governor, McCrory decided to return to the private sector. He went on to work for his brother's consulting firm, and also joined the law firm of Moore Van Allen. McCrory also began to pave the way for a possible 2012 gubernatorial campaign by remaining active in the North Carolina Republican Party. He spoke at numerous GOP county and district conventions and dinners, as well as the 2009, 2010 and 2011 state GOP conventions.

After being a centerpiece of the 2010 Republican takeover of the North Carolina Legislature, McCrory worked closely with Senate Leader Phil Berger and House Speaker Thom Tillis, both of whom hail from the Charlotte area and are close friends of McCrory's.

== 2012 gubernatorial campaign ==
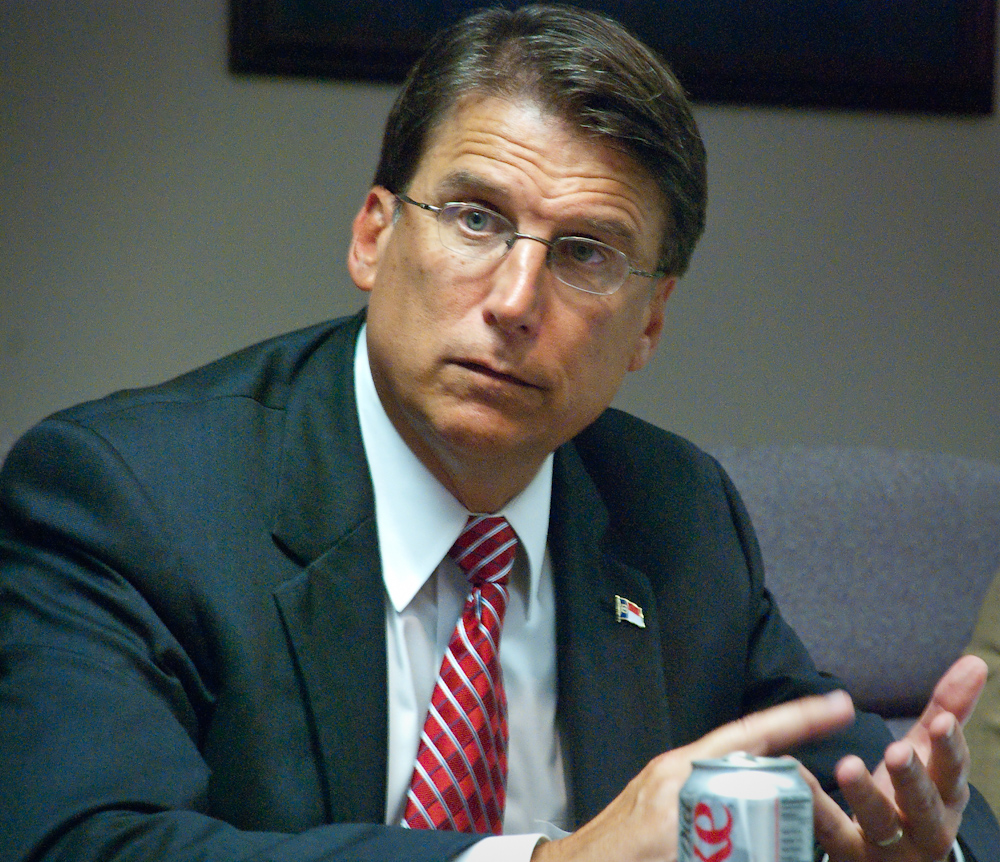
Gov. McCrory speaks at the Cary Innovation Center in 2012.

Governor Bev Perdue declined to seek re-election in 2012. McCrory then announced his candidacy for governor on January 31, 2012. On May 8, 2012, he won the Republican primary with 83.40% of the vote. McCrory went on to defeat Democratic Lieutenant Governor Walter Dalton in the general election, 55% to 43%. It is the largest margin of victory for a Republican in an open-seat race for governor since Reconstruction.

When asked in a debate what further abortion restrictions he would sign into law if elected, he answered, "None." McCrory publicized his positions on the economy and education in two white papers. One was called "The North Carolina Comeback" and focused on economic recovery. In it he stated that he would strive to reduce the unemployment rate to below South Carolina's and also to restructure the North Carolina's tax codes.

The other paper, "A Passion for Education," advocated several areas for reform: more classroom technology, such as virtual courses and hand-held technology; teacher merit-pay systems; and expansion of charter schools. McCrory also suggested stopping social promotion of some students and creating a new method of grading schools.

=== Campaign finance ===
The Raleigh News & Observer reported that McCrory would declare adding $2.2 million in the second quarter, totaling $4.4 million available for campaign spending, with 98 percent of the donors from North Carolina. For 2012, the North Carolina Board of Elections required second-quarter campaign-finance reports to be filed by July 11. In the first-quarter campaign-finance reports, McCrory showed that his campaign added at least $1 million more to its bottom line than Dalton's campaign. In the first quarter McCrory reported outraising Dalton by more than $1 million. He also reported raising nearly $3 million more than Dalton for the election cycle to date. McCrory reported having $3.1 million cash on hand, and Dalton reported $670,356.14.

== Governor of North Carolina (2013–2017) ==
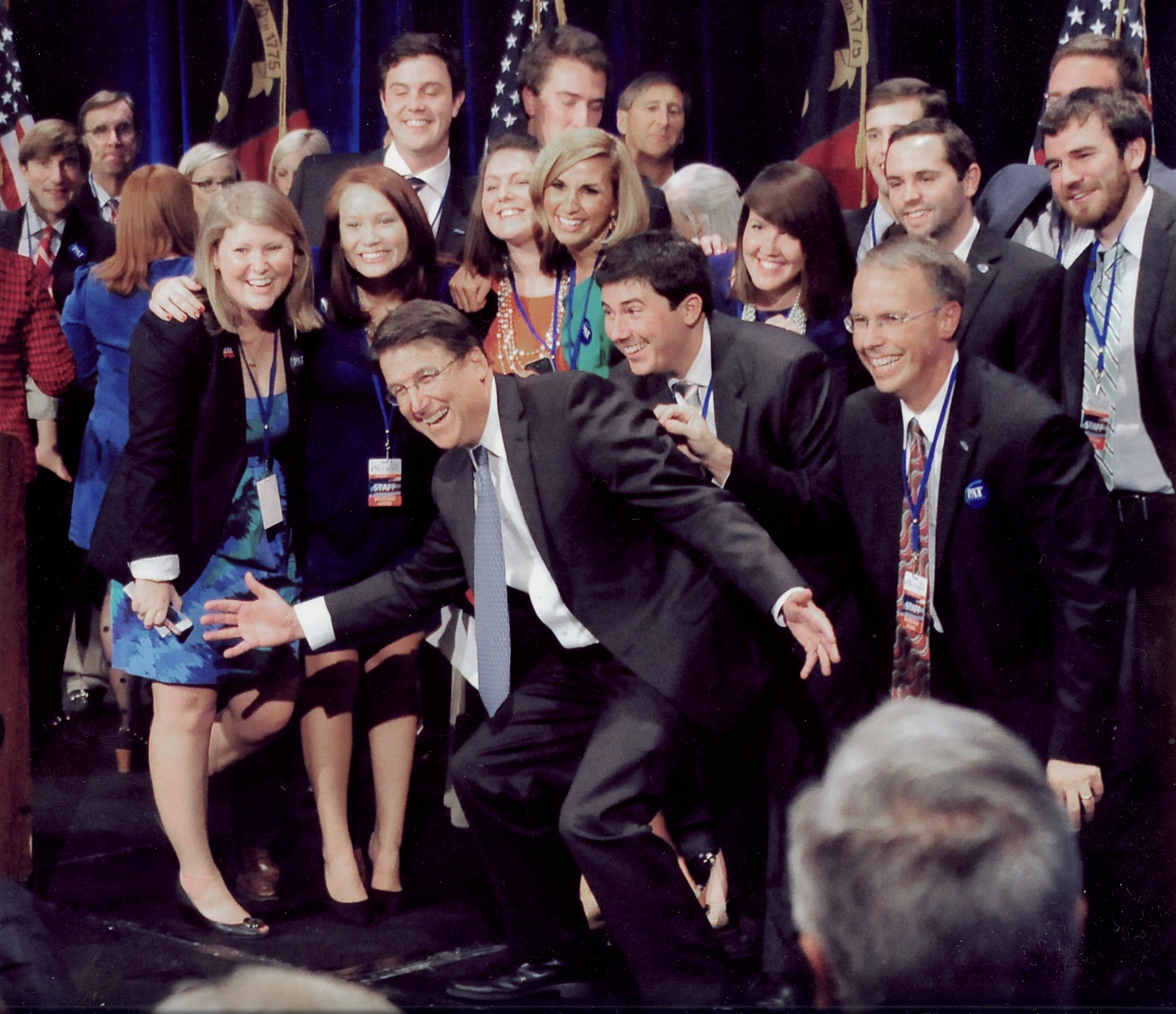
Pat McCrory celebrating his election victory

McCrory took office on January 5, 2013, the first Republican Governor of the state since James G. Martin left office on January 9, 1993. His swearing-in gave the Republicans complete control of state government for the first time since Reconstruction.

=== Legislation ===
McCrory's election marked the first time that Republicans controlled both houses of the General Assembly as well as the governorship since 1870. From taking office, McCrory had signed into law a number of bills promoting conservative governance.

He signed legislation which made North Carolina the 8th state to cut unemployment benefits since the 2007 start of the Great Recession. In addition to cutting maximum weekly unemployment benefits by 35%, the state reduced the maximum number of weeks of assistance to between 12 and 20, down from 26. The cut prevented 170,000 North Carolinians from benefiting from federal emergency extended benefits, which require a minimum of 26 weeks of state support, but also allowed the state's unemployment fund, which had become bankrupt over the course of the recession, to become solvent three years sooner. The move was criticized by some for passing up federal support and weakening the government safety net when the state had the nation's 5th-highest unemployment.

In March 2013, citing concerns about the sustainability of the program, McCrory signed a bill that opted the state out of the expanded Medicaid program of the Affordable Care Act of 2009, which would have provided healthcare coverage to 500,000 North Carolinians. He also proposed managing Medicaid accounts, by enrolling patients in managed-care programs run by private companies.

In May 2013, McCrory signed a North Carolina adaptation of Caylee's Law after receiving unanimous consent in the General Assembly. Caylee's Law had been enacted by several state legislatures in response to the verdict in the Casey Anthony trial, which garnered national attention. The law makes a parent/caregiver who deliberately fails to report their child missing guilty of a Class I Felony, among other felonious acts such as concealing the death of a child under the new law.

McCrory signed into law a bill repealing the state's controversial Racial Justice Act of 2009. The law was unique in that it allowed inmates facing the death penalty to use broad statistics to challenge their sentences on the basis of alleged racial discrimination. Prior to repeal of the Racial Justice Act, nearly every death row inmate, regardless of race, used the law as a basis to file an appeal. The delays caused by those appeals still persist today. The state of North Carolina has not executed an inmate since 2006.

He signed legislation to require voters to present government-issued photo identification in order to vote, repeal same-day voter registration, and reduce the number of days of early voting. In July 2016, a three-judge panel of the Fourth Circuit Court of Appeals struck down the photo ID provisions, finding that they targeted African Americans "with almost surgical precision" and that the legislators had acted with "discriminatory intent" in enacting the strict election rules. McCrory said the three-judge panel had a liberal makeup, and that 33 states have enacted some form of voter ID requirement.

In July 2013, McCrory signed tax reform legislation that created a modified flat-tax system for the state by specifying a single income-tax rate and a larger standard deduction but eliminating the personal exemption. It also repealed North Carolina's estate tax.

In August 2013, McCrory signed into law the Regulatory Reform Act of 2013. The legislation, according to the bill, was "an act to improve and streamline the regulatory process in order to stimulate job creation, to eliminate unnecessary regulation, to make various other statutory changes, and to amend certain environmental and natural resource laws." The law requires all previous rules and regulations not mandated by federal law to be reviewed over ten years by the Rules Review Commission through a three-step process.

In June 2014, McCrory signed the Energy Modernization Act of 2014 into law. The bill allows hydraulic fracturing, or "fracking," in the state, and criminalizes the disclosure of fracking chemicals, lifting a 2012 moratorium that blocked fracking permits. "We remain intensely focused on creating good jobs, particularly in our rural areas," McCrory said. "We have watched and waited as other states moved forward with energy exploration, and it is finally our turn. This legislation will spur economic development at all levels of our economy, not just the energy sector." Once the state completes its regulations, the law will allow for permits to be issued without additional approval. The bill also criminalizes the disclosure of chemicals or substances used by oil and gas companies during the fracking process. The legislation also bans local governments from interfering with oil and gas exploration, development, and production activities.

==== Lame-duck special session ====
During a special lame-duck session, after having conceded defeat in the 2016 election, McCrory signed legislation into law that would reduce the power of the North Carolina governorship, including his ability to appoint the majority of the members to the State Board of Elections. The editorial board of the Charlotte Observer critiqued the bills as an egregious power-grab, citing former governors of both parties. On December 30, 2016, a state judge temporarily blocked the law from going into effect, and a panel of judges extended the block on January 5, 2017.

=== Vetoes ===
McCrory issued his first veto as governor in August 2013, of a bill that would have required people applying for welfare benefits to pass a drug test. He later also vetoed a bill that extended from 90 days to nine months the amount of time that an employee could work without undergoing a background check in the E-Verify system. Both vetoes were overridden by the General Assembly in September 2013, meaning that both bills became law.

In June 2014, McCrory vetoed a bill because of a provision altering the makeup of the Division of Employment Security Board of Review.

On May 28, 2015, McCrory vetoed a bill that would have allowed magistrates with religious objections to refuse to perform same-sex marriages. The next day, McCrory vetoed a variation on an "ag-gag" bill. Both of these vetoes were overridden by the legislature.

=== Education ===
McCrory signed the largest education budgets in North Carolina history in 2013 and 2015. A number of education changes were included in the state budget enacted in 2013 and 2016. McCrory supports merit-based pay in some cases. McCrory entered office in 2013 with teacher pay ranked 47th in the nation, and by 2016, the state's ranking moved up 41st in the nation. McCrory signed the largest teacher pay raise in the nation in 2016, which led to average teacher pay rising to $50,000 per year. The rankings for year 2017 will account for the 2016 pay raises. Those yet-to-be-released rankings are expected to move North Carolina up several slots. School districts are authorized to give $500-per-year raises to up to 25% of teachers. Low-income students are now eligible to receive vouchers up to $4,200 toward the cost of attending private schools. Teacher tenure has been replaced with a contract system. State funding for Teach for America has been increased to $6 million.

In a nationally broadcast radio interview with conservative talk-show host William Bennett, McCrory made a series of comments on the future of higher education in North Carolina that generated controversy. McCrory stated that "some of the educational elite have taken over our education where we are offering courses that have no chance of getting people jobs," and later responded to a comment Bennett made on gender studies courses by saying: "That's a subsidized course. If you want to take gender studies, that's fine, go to a private school and take it. But I don't want to subsidize that if that's not going to get someone a job."

=== "Moral Mondays" protests ===
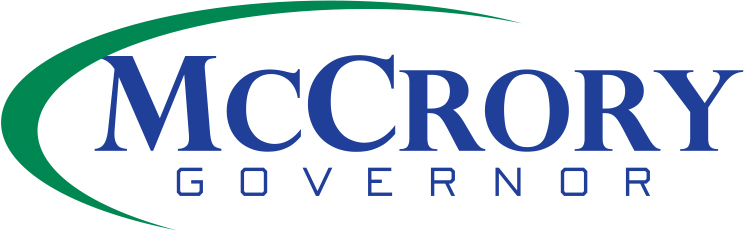
Pat McCrory for Governor logo

Several bills signed into law by McCrory and multiple pieces of proposed legislation were the target of ongoing "Moral Monday" civil disobedience protests during his tenure, organized in part by local religious leaders including William Barber II, head of the North Carolina chapter of the NAACP at the time. Cited reasons for the protests included proposed changes to Medicaid, changes to voting regulations, school vouchers, and tax reform. McCrory criticized the protests as unlawful and a drain on state resources, and declined to meet with the protestors, later stating "outsiders are coming in and they're going to try to do to us what they did to Scott Walker in Wisconsin."

=== Abortion access ===
In July 2013, McCrory signed into law legislation which required abortion providers to meet the same standards as surgical centers, allowed health-care providers to decline to perform abortions, and prevented any public health-insurance policy from paying for abortions. Abortion-rights groups criticized McCrory, who had promised during his campaign that he would not sign new abortion restrictions. McCrory responded: "This law does not further limit access, and those who contend it does are more interested in politics than the health and safety of our citizens." WRAL stated that the legislation broke McCrory's campaign pledge.

=== Duke Energy ===
Following a February 2, 2014, coal ash spill that was the third-largest of its kind in US history, the US Attorney's Office opened a grand-jury investigation into Duke Energy. McCrory had been an employee of Duke Energy for 28 years, and critics said his administration had intervened on Duke's behalf to settle lawsuits over environmental violations. The U.S. Attorney's office subpoenaed 23 officials of the McCrory administration and sought records of "investments, cash or other items of value" passed from Duke to McCrory administration officials, but produced charges only aimed at Duke Energy in February 2015. Duke Energy was fined $99,111 for leaks from ponds at two power plants; the amount was part of a deal made by the Department of Environment and Natural Resources' secretary, John E. Skvarla III, a McCrory appointee.

In August 2014, McCrory announced that he had previously owned more than $10,000 in Duke Energy stock and that he sold the stock after the coal-ash spill without disclosing the sale in state ethics filings. His lawyer stated that the mistake was based on the lawyer's misunderstanding of the timeframe covered by the earlier disclosures.

On March 8, 2015, the McCrory administration fined Duke Energy $25 million for years of groundwater pollution, the largest fine for environmental damage ever imposed by the state. The second-largest fine ever imposed by the state was in 1986 for $5.7 million.

McCrory appointed Dr. Randall W. Williams, an OB/GYN, as the state's Health Director. Williams became embroiled in controversy over the safety of household well water near coal ash ponds. In testimony in May 2016, related to a lawsuit, state toxicologist Ken Rudo said state health and environmental officials including Williams and former Department of Environmental Quality (DEQ) Assistant Secretary Tom Reeder, attempted to “play down the risk” of coal ash contamination of those wells. The two officials had rescinded a "do-not-drink" notice sent to some well owners in March 2016. Rudo said in his deposition in the case that the state was informing residents that their household water was safe to drink when it knew it wasn't. Williams contended that he had rescinded those warning notices because he felt they were unnecessarily stirring up alarms. The state's Department of Health and Human Services disagreed with Rudo's contentions. Megan Davies, a state Division of Public Health epidemiologist who was section chief and Rudo's supervisor, resigned because of the manner in which the department and McCrory's administration disputed Rudo's testimony. Davies and a co-worker testified regarding concerns they held about the state inappropriately rescinding the warning notices. On December 30, a day before McCrory was leaving office, he appointed Williams, one of his closest advisors, to the Oil & Gas Commission, a regulatory body that had been moribund since the governor won a legal battle with the legislature over appointments a year earlier. Six weeks later, Williams was appointed Health and Senior Services Director in Missouri by controversial Governor Eric Greitens.

=== Public Facilities Privacy & Security Act ===
On March 23, 2016, McCrory signed the Public Facilities Privacy & Security Act (commonly known as House Bill 2 or HB2). The law eliminated anti-discrimination protections including for gay and transgender people and barred municipalities from re-establishing them. It initially legislated that in government buildings, people could only use restrooms that correspond to the sex on their birth certificates, preventing transgender people who do not or cannot alter their birth certificates from using the restroom consistent with their gender identity. More broadly, the law eliminated municipal anti-discrimination policies concerning race, gender, and veteran status or military service, and prohibited municipalities from establishing local minimum wages, benefits, employee protections and leave policies. Senate Democratic Leader Dan Blue said "This bill essentially repeals 50 years of non-discrimination efforts and gives lawmakers in Raleigh unprecedented control over our city and local governments." "North Carolina Republicans want to pass what would potentially be the single most discriminatory act in the country. This is a direct affront to equality, civil rights, and local autonomy." McCrory stated that the law was passed in response to the Charlotte City Council on February 22, 2016, passing a non-discrimination ordinance prohibiting discrimination on the basis of sexual orientation or gender identity in public accommodations (including restrooms) or by passenger vehicles for hire or city contractors. McCrory had asked council members not to pass the ordinance. The speaker of the House and lieutenant governor invoked a rarely used constitutional provision to call themselves into session, without McCrory calling it, by collecting sufficient signatures from legislators. On March 23, 2016, the legislature sent the Public Facilities Privacy & Security Act to the governor's desk for his signature and McCrory signed the bill on the same evening it passed.

The law sparked public protests and motivated entertainers such as Bruce Springsteen to cancel shows. Companies pulled jobs and investments out of the state: PayPal stopped a planned expansion that would have created 400 jobs, Lionsgate moved production of a television show out of North Carolina, Deutsche Bank halted plans to add 250 jobs in the state, and over 160 other companies called for the law's repeal. Several states and cities, including Atlanta, banned official travel to North Carolina. Time Warner Cable News estimated that as of April 22, the law had cost the state over 1750 jobs and over $77 million of investments and visitor spending. On July 21, 2016, the National Basketball Association (NBA) announced that it would move the 2017 All-Star game out of Charlotte. The NBA's decision to move the game away from Charlotte outraged Republicans who noted Charlotte was chosen for the All-Star game by the league after the city had voted down a similar ordinance itself. Republicans also noted HB2 had no jurisdiction over private facilities, meaning the league could set any bathroom policy it preferred for games it was to host in Charlotte. September 12, 2016, the NCAA announced that it would pull their championship games from the state due to the association's opposition to HB2.

On Tuesday, April 12, McCrory signed an executive order that "expands the state's employment policy for state employees to cover sexual orientation and gender identity" and "seeks legislation to reinstate the right to sue in state court for discrimination." McCrory's executive order also encouraged the General Assembly to reinstate the ability for residents to sue an employer in state court for discrimination. On July 28, 2016, the General Assembly officially restored that portion of the law.

On several occasions, McCrory pushed for a deal that would repeal HB2 in exchange for the City of Charlotte voting to repeal their ordinance. On September 19, 2016, a Charlotte news station reported a majority of Charlotte City Councilmen had agreed to repeal their ordinance, which would have led to the legislature repealing HB2. A Democratic member of the North Carolina legislature told the station a fellow member of the legislature personally lobbied Democratic members of the Charlotte City Council to keep the ordinance in place, which would, in turn, keep HB2 in place, creating a wedge issue to boost Democratic turnout in the November 2016 general election.

On July 1, 2016, WBTV reported members of the General Assembly had an agreement in place to come back into session and repeal some of the more controversial portions of HB2. In this case, an off-the-record source said then-Attorney General Cooper, played an integral role in killing the compromise bill. According to the report, 10 House Democrats had signed on to the plan to alter HB2 in a way that would satisfy the business community. The report said Cooper personally called the 10 Democrats and demanded they vote against the bill if they "wanted to be on the team in November." The state Carolina Republican Party said Cooper helped kill their modification bill in order to keep the controversial issue alive in his bid to unseat McCrory. A Cooper campaign spokesperson said the A.G. remained concerned about the damage HB 2 was doing to the North Carolina economy and, "...has consistently urged members to pursue a full repeal." "Unfortunately Governor McCrory and legislative Republicans have repeatedly offered so-called 'fixes' that fail the basic test of undoing the economic damage done by this discriminatory law. This isn't that complicated: instead of pointing fingers and holding secret negotiations, lawmakers should simply repeal HB 2 and send a message that North Carolina is open for business."

The United States Department of Justice, in addition to several private citizens, filed lawsuits against McCrory and the state challenging HB2. The Justice Department said that North Carolina was in violation of federal civil rights laws. Separately, McCrory filed suit against the federal government, asking a court to find the state law constitutional.

After McCrory was defeated in his 2016 bid for re-election, legislators repealed HB2 and passed a replacement on March 30, 2017. The repeal legislation passed the House 70-48 and the Senate by a 32–16 vote. Gov. Roy Cooper signed the repeal bill later that day, though he said the new law was "not a perfect deal and it's not my preferred solution. It stops short of many things we need to do as a state." Some repeal advocates opposed the compromise because of provisions they contended would still permit discrimination, specifically a three-year ban on passage of new local nondiscrimination ordinances, a provision that ended in December 2020.

=== Approval ratings ===
According to polling by the Civitas Institute, McCrory's approval rating during his first year in office fell 15 percentage points to 49% between June and July 2013. A second poll conducted in July 2013 indicated that the governor's approval rating had fallen to 40%, down from 45% in June. The same poll indicated that only 35% of voters approved of the Republican-led state government. At the start of April 2015, the Public Policy Polling firm found McCrory to have an approval rating of 36% and a disapproval rating of 45%.

Towards the end of his term in office, in September 2016, a poll commissioned by Bloomberg Politics reported 49% of North Carolinians approving of his job performance, and 44% disapproved.

=== 2016 gubernatorial campaign ===
McCrory faced Cooper in the hotly contested 2016 general election. On election night, McCrory narrowly trailed Cooper, with fewer than 5,000 votes separating the candidates out of more than 4.6 million cast.

==== Refusal to concede and unproven fraud accusations ====
On November 10, 2016, McCrory's campaign set up a legal defense fund in anticipation of a legal battle and potential recount citing "grave concerns over potential irregularities" regarding 90,000 votes from Durham County. The McCrory campaign filed election protests alleging that voter fraud helped Cooper in 50 counties. After the recount made clear he had lost by at least 10,000 votes, McCrory conceded the race to Cooper on December 5. McCrory was the first sitting Governor of North Carolina to lose a bid for reelection since Charles Manly in 1850.

In November 2018, McCrory falsely claimed that there were many North Carolina students who committed voter fraud during the 2016 election. McCrory said that North Carolina students with out-of-state driving licenses were illegally voting and that voter ID laws would have stopped them; however, it is entirely legal for college students to vote in the state where they are attending college. The News & Observer noted that it is illegal to spread misinformation about people's voting eligibility; McCrory said he was simply "raising questions."

== 2022 U.S. Senate election ==
In 2022, McCrory unsuccessfully ran for the Republican nomination in the U.S. Senate election to succeed the retiring Republican Richard Burr. During the campaign, McCrory mentioned "I was a huge defender -- and continue to be a huge defender -- of Trump policies." McCrory objected to Trump's efforts to overturn the election, acknowledging that Joe Biden had won the election. McCrory accused Trump of "destroying democracy." Trump endorsed U.S. Representative Ted Budd in the Republican primary for Senate. McCrory subsequently lost the primary to Budd.

== Electoral history ==
North Carolina gubernatorial election, 2008
Party	Candidate	Votes	%	±%
Democratic	Bev Perdue	2,146,189	50.27%	−5.34%
Republican	Pat McCrory	2,001,168	46.88%	+4.00%
Libertarian	Michael C. Munger	121,584	2.85%	+1.34%
Majority		145,021	3.40%	−9.34%
Turnout		4,268,941	100.00%	N/A
Democratic hold				

2012 North Carolina Republican gubernatorial primary election
Party	Candidate	Votes	%
Republican	Pat McCrory	748,180	83.40
Republican	Paul Wright	47,403	5.28
Republican	Scott Jones	31,191	3.48
Republican	Jim Mahan	30,056	3.35
Republican	Jim Harney	26,485	2.95
Republican	Charles Kenneth Moss	13,822	1.54

2012 North Carolina gubernatorial election
Party	Candidate	Votes	%
Republican	Pat McCrory	2,440,707	54.62%
Democratic	Walter Dalton	1,931,580	43.23%
Libertarian	Barbara Howe	94,652	2.12%
Independent	Write-in candidates (miscellaneous)	1,356	0.03%
Independent	Donald Kreamer (write-in)	59	0.00%
Total votes		4,468,295	100

2016 North Carolina Republican gubernatorial primary election
Party	Candidate	Votes	%
Republican	Pat McCrory (incumbent)	876,885	81.75
Republican	Robert Brawley	113,638	10.59
Republican	Charles Kenneth Moss	82,132	7.66

2016 North Carolina gubernatorial election
Party	Candidate	Votes	%	±%
Democratic	Roy Cooper	2,309,162	49.02	+5.79%
Republican	Pat McCrory (incumbent)	2,298,881	48.80	−5.82%
Libertarian	Lon Cecil	102,978	2.19	+0.06%
Margin of victory		10,281	0.22	−7.92%
Turnout		4,711,021	68.98	+1.68%
Democratic gain from Republican				

2022 North Carolina Senate Republican primary results
Party	Candidate	Votes	%
Republican	Ted Budd	448,128	58.61%
Republican	Pat McCrory	188,135	24.60%
Republican	Mark Walker	70,486	9.22%
Republican	Marjorie Eastman	22,535	2.95%
Republican	David Flaherty	7,265	0.95%
Republican	Kenneth Harper, Jr.	7,129	0.93%
Republican	Jen Banwart	3,088	0.40%
Republican	Charles Kenneth Moss	2,920	0.38%
Republican	Leonard Bryant	2,906	0.38%
Republican	Benjamin E. Griffiths	2,870	0.38%
Republican	Debora Tshiovo	2,741	0.36%
Republican	Lee A. Brian	2,232	0.29%
Republican	Lichia Sibhatu	2,191	0.29%
Republican	Drew Bulecza	2,022	0.26%
Total votes		764,648	100.0%

Political offices
Preceded by Richard Vinroot	Mayor of Charlotte; 1995–2009	Succeeded by Anthony Foxx
Preceded by Bev Perdue	Governor of North Carolina; 2013–2017	Succeeded by Roy Cooper
Party political offices
Preceded by Patrick Ballantine	Republican nominee for Governor of North Carolina; 2008, 2012, 2016	Succeeded by Dan Forest
U.S. order of precedence (ceremonial)
Preceded by Bev Perdue as Former Governor	Order of precedence of the United States	Succeeded by Roy Cooper as Former Governor
