= Marcus Robinson (prisoner) =

African-American convicted murderer (1973–2022)

Marcus Reymond Robinson (April 2, 1973 – June 9, 2022) was an African-American convicted and sentenced to death in Cumberland County Superior Court for the June 1991 death of 17-year-old Erik Tornblom. Robinson also was sentenced to 40 years in prison for robbery with a dangerous weapon, 10 years for larceny and five years for possessing a weapon of mass destruction. In April 2012, he successfully appealed against the death sentence under North Carolina's 2009 Racial Justice Act which allowed for a prisoner under sentence of death to appeal for the sentence to be commuted to life imprisonment if racism is proven to be a factor in the original trial. North Carolina Superior Court judge Gregory Weeks found that the Act was applicable in Robinson's case after his lawyers cited a study from Michigan State University indicating that qualified black jurors were systemically excluded from jury service, both generally in North Carolina and at Robinson's trial. Consequently, Weeks ordered his removal from death row. Robinson was the first death row inmate to use the legislation.

The Racial Justice Act was repealed in 2013, and two years later the North Carolina Supreme Court vacated the North Carolina v. Robinson ruling on procedural grounds, because the prosecutors had not had enough time to prepare for the hearing. A new trial court dismissed Robinson's case, and he filed an appeal to the state's Supreme Court in May 2017.

Robinson died of an apparent suicide after he was found unresponsive in his cell at 12:14pm on June 9, 2022. Prison first responders performed live-saving measures until paramedics arrived, and pronounced him dead at 12:35pm.
