= Racial Justice Act =

2009 law in North Carolina

The North Carolina Racial Justice Act of 2009 prohibited seeking or imposing the death penalty on the basis of race. It passed both the North Carolina State Senate and the North Carolina House of Representatives and was signed into law by Governor Bev Perdue. The law was repealed in 2013. (In 1998 Kentucky had passed the first Racial Justice Act in the country. By comparison, it was more narrowly drawn than that in North Carolina.)

== Provisions ==
North Carolina's act identified types of evidence that might be considered by the court when considering whether race was a basis for seeking or imposing the death penalty and established a process by which relevant evidence might be used to establish that race was a significant factor in seeking or imposing the death penalty. The defendant had the burden of proving that race was a significant factor in seeking or imposing the death penalty. The state was allowed to offer evidence to rebut the claims or evidence of the defendant. If race was found to be a significant factor in the imposition of the death penalty, the death sentence would automatically be commuted to life imprisonment without the possibility of parole.

The act applied retroactively to persons on death row, of which there were more than 145 in the state. From 2006, when the state adopted a moratorium on the use of the death penalty, to 2016, only 17 persons had been sentenced to death and added to those on death row.

== North Carolina General Assembly repeal attempts ==
Under pressure from a group of 43 district attorneys, who expressed opposition to the act, citing the clog of the court system in the state, the North Carolina Senate passed a bill by a 27-14 vote on November 28, 2011, that would have effectively repealed the Racial Justice Act. However, on December 14, Governor Bev Perdue, a Democrat, vetoed the bill. She said that while she supports the death penalty, she felt it was "simply unacceptable for racial prejudice to play a role in the imposition of the death penalty in North Carolina." The state legislature did not have enough votes to override Perdue's veto.

=== Major revision (2012) ===
In 2012 the North Carolina General Assembly passed a major revision of the law authored by Rep. Paul Stam (R-Wake). The rewrite "severely restricts the use of statistics to only the county or judicial district where the crime occurred, instead of the entire state or region. It also says statistics alone are insufficient to prove bias and that the race of the victim cannot be taken into account." However, studies have shown that when the victim is white, Black defendants are more likely to be sentenced to death if convicted. The bill was vetoed by Gov. Perdue. But this time the legislature overrode the governor's veto.

=== Repeal ===
The North Carolina General Assembly voted to repeal the entire law in 2013. It included a provision that nullified any existing claims based on the law by making the repeal apply retroactively. Gov. Pat McCrory, a Republican elected in 2012, signed the repeal into law. On June 5, 2020, the North Carolina Supreme Court ruled the portion of the repeal that retroactively voided claims based on the law was unconstitutional under the North Carolina state constitution's prohibition on ex post facto laws.

== Appeals under act ==
On April 20, 2012, in the first case appealed under the Racial Justice Act, Judge Greg Weeks, then-Senior Resident Superior Court Judge in Cumberland County (Fayetteville), ruled in favor of the plaintiff Marcus Raymond Robinson that racial bias had influenced his case, automatically commuting his death sentence to life without parole. Robinson contended that when he was sentenced to death in 1994, prosecutors had deliberately kept Blacks off the jury. Robinson's lawyers cited a study from Michigan State University College of Law indicating that prosecutors across North Carolina improperly used their peremptory challenges to systemically exclude qualified Black jurors from jury service. By 2014, three more cases, that of Christina Walters, Tilmon Golphin, and Quintel Augustine, had been successfully appealed. However, in 2015, the state's Supreme Court vacated the rulings on procedural grounds. However, in September 2020, it reinstated the sentencing modifications. The Supreme Court has also ruled that the repeal cannot be applied retroactively.
