= Mike Easley =

72nd governor of North Carolina from 2001 to 2009

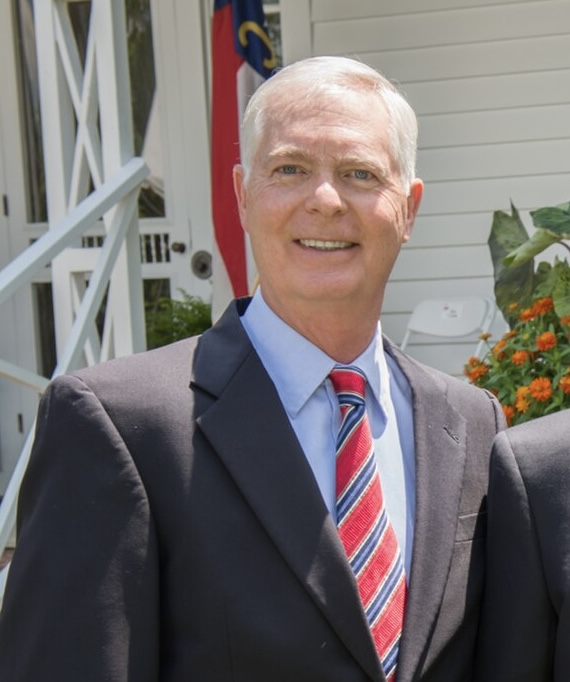
- Easley in 2011

72nd Governor of North Carolina
- In office January 6, 2001 – January 10, 2009
- Lieutenant: Bev Perdue
- Preceded by: Jim Hunt
- Succeeded by: Bev Perdue

49th Attorney General of North Carolina
- In office January 9, 1993 – January 6, 2001
- Governor: Jim Hunt
- Preceded by: Lacy Thornburg
- Succeeded by: Roy Cooper

Personal details
- Born: Michael Francis Easley; March 23, 1950 (age 76) Rocky Mount, North Carolina, U.S.
- Party: Democratic
- Spouse: Mary Pipines (m. 1980)
- Children: Michael F. Easley Jr.
- Education: Belmont Abbey College (attended); University of North Carolina, Chapel Hill (BA); North Carolina Central University (JD)

Michael Francis Easley (born March 23, 1950) is an American lawyer and politician who served as the 72nd governor of North Carolina from 2001 to 2009. He is the first governor of North Carolina to have been convicted of a felony. The conviction was later expunged by the Chief Judge of the Superior Court of Wake County. A member of the Democratic Party, Easley was North Carolina's first Catholic governor.

== Early life and education ==
Mike Easley was born on March 23, 1950, in Rocky Mount, North Carolina, to Henry Alexander Easley and Huldah Marie Easley. He grew up on his family's 60-acre farm in Nash County and was one of seven children in a large Irish Catholic family. Easley attended a local Catholic school before transferring and later graduating from Rocky Mount Senior High School in 1968. Easley attended Belmont Abbey College for two years before transferring to the University of North Carolina at Chapel Hill, where he earned a degree with honors in political science in 1972. While at UNC he was a member of Phi Gamma Delta fraternity. He then attended the North Carolina Central University School of Law, earning his J.D. degree, with honors, in 1976. While a law student, Easley served as managing editor of the school's Law Review.

== Family ==
Easley is married to Mary Easley (née Pipines), who worked in the Provost's Office at North Carolina State University until June 8, 2009. She is a former law professor at North Carolina Central University and also worked for ten years as a prosecutor. The two have one son, Michael F. Easley Jr.

== Career ==
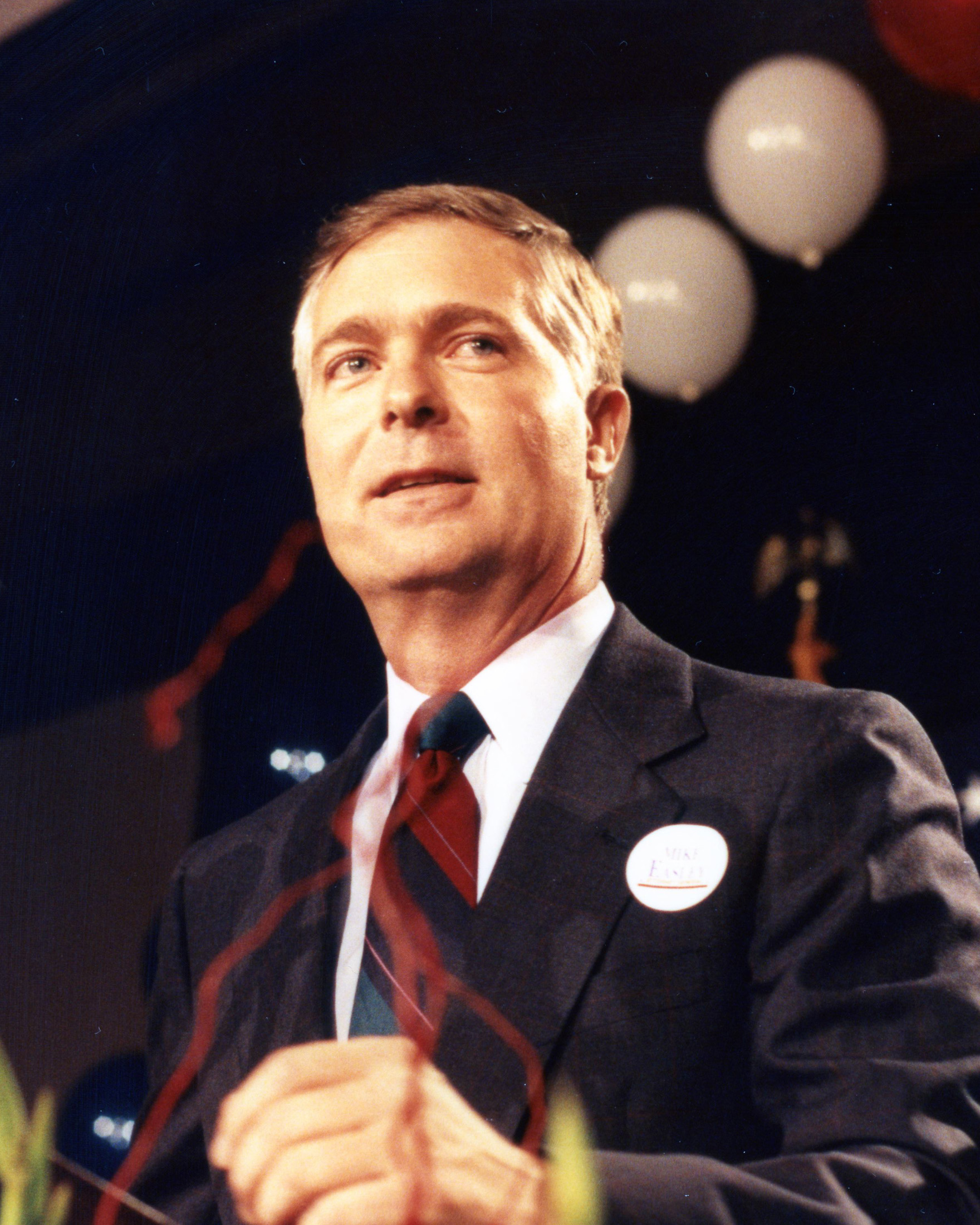
Easley was elected Attorney General in 1992

Easley became an assistant district attorney for the 13th Judicial District in 1976. He was elected District Attorney, one of the youngest ever in the state, in 1982.

A Democrat, Easley ran unsuccessfully in that party's 1990 primary for the U.S. Senate; he lost to former Charlotte mayor Harvey Gantt, who himself lost to incumbent Jesse Helms. Easley was elected North Carolina Attorney General in 1992 and sworn in on January 9, 1993. He won reelection in 1996. In the 1996 election for attorney general, Easley garnered 59.07% of the vote, compared with opponent Robert H. Edmonds Jr.'s 40.93% of votes. This represented a margin of victory of 446,169 votes.

In 2000, Easley ran to succeed the term-limited Hunt as Governor of North Carolina. He defeated incumbent Lieutenant Governor Dennis A. Wicker in the Democratic primary, and then successfully challenged Republican Richard Vinroot, former mayor of Charlotte, in the general election. Easley was reelected in 2004, running against New Hanover County state senator Patrick J. Ballantine.

=== Governorship ===
In the closing weeks of the 2000 gubernatorial race, actor Andy Griffith filmed an ad endorsing Easley, which some observers believe led to Easley's victory, called the "Mayberry Miracle".

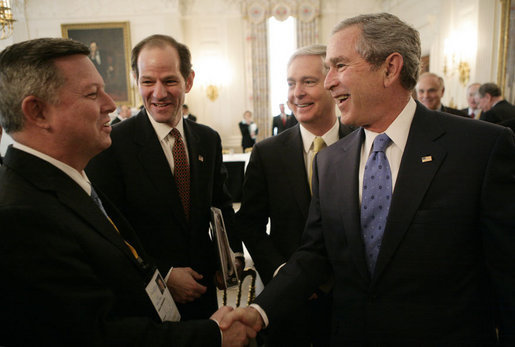
Easley with President George W. Bush, Nebraska governor Dave Heineman, and New York governor Eliot Spitzer in 2007.

The "Learn and Earn" program received the Innovations in American Government Award from Harvard Kennedy School. Presenting the award, Harvard noted that in "2006-2007, rates of grade promotion and graduation for Learn and Earn participants were higher than the statewide average, with nearly half the Learn and Earn high schools seeing 100 percent promotion rates". Harvard also observed that these numbers have not "been skewed by "creaming" that is counting of only high scoring children. The program purposely targets kids at risk, those for whom English is a second language[,] and those who would be first-generation college students." Easley also initiated a program to enable North Carolina students to attain a debt-free undergraduate education by receiving EARN Grants of up to $8,000 over two years.

His tenure faced budget shortfalls, tough economic times, and natural disasters such as hurricanes and floods. Easley received mixed reviews on his handling of fiscal problems in the state. His supporters claimed many of the budget shortfall situations were created before he even took office, during the Hunt administration, while his detractors criticized his support of raising sales taxes multiple times to cover the cost of new state programs. During his administration, Easley confronted the state legislature on numerous occasions. Easley is the first North Carolina governor to use the power of veto, which voters gave the governor's office in 1996. First, in November 2002, Easley vetoed legislation related to unqualified appointments to various boards and commissions. In June 2003, he vetoed a bill that stripped the State Board of Education of its authority to set teacher standards. In August 2003, he vetoed HB 917 which raised fees charged by finance companies. In July 2004, he vetoed HB 429 which would have required local governments to make cash payments to billboard owners of up to five times the annual revenue generated by the billboard upon its removal. In March 2005, he vetoed SB 130 which would have conveyed state property. In September 2005, he vetoed HB 706 which would have affected teacher standards. In August 2007 he vetoed HB 1761, a controversial financial incentives bill which would have awarded up to 40 million dollars to companies within the state. Easley has used his veto power a total of nine times as of 2008. His ninth veto was the first to be overridden by the legislature in North Carolina history.

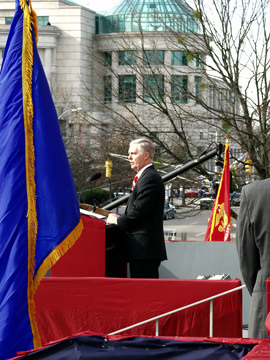
Easley speaking at his second inauguration, 2005

Easley ran for a second term as governor in 2004. He defeated Rickey Kipfer, his only opponent in the Democratic primary, and faced Republican former state senator Patrick Ballantine and Libertarian Barbara Howe in November 2004. Though the state voted for Republicans George W. Bush for president and Richard Burr as United States Senator, Easley won his second term as governor and Democrats reestablished control over both chambers of the state legislature (the House had been split equally between the two major parties since 2003).

He also supported a controversial statewide lottery, which was ultimately approved on August 31, 2005, after Lieutenant Governor Bev Perdue cast a tie-breaking vote in the Senate. He has stated that proceeds from the lottery will be used for much-needed educational programs. Easley presided over 27 executions, including the 1,000th after the death penalty was reintroduced in the United States in 1976. He, however, granted commutation to two death row inmates. The North Carolina governor has the sole right to commute death sentences imposed by a state court.

Governor Easley declined to run against Elizabeth Dole for her Senate seat in 2008. He was considered to be a possible candidate for U.S. Senate to run against Senator Richard Burr in 2010, but he had strongly denied interest in the race. The Raleigh News & Observer speculated in October 2006 that Easley was going to act like a presidential contender in order to position himself for the vice presidential nomination or a cabinet post.

In 2008 in a case that drew international attention, a North Carolina state trooper was filmed hanging and kicking a police dog he was training. After the trooper's superiors recommended minor punishment, Easley's office recommended that the trooper be fired. The trooper sued the state after the Highway Patrol refused his reinstatement. In 2010, a superior court judge ruled in the troopers favor and he was reinstated with back pay.

As governor, Easley was a member of the National Governors Association, the Southern Governors' Association, and the Democratic Governors Association. However, he was known for being "reclusive" while in office.

He was succeeded as governor by his Lieutenant Governor, Beverly Perdue, who defeated Charlotte Mayor Pat McCrory in a close race. After leaving office, Easley went to work part-time promoting early college high schools and similar programs for the Bill and Melinda Gates Foundation.

== Political positions ==
During the 2004 Democratic primaries, he supported North Carolina Senator John Edwards.

In the 2008 campaigns, Easley initially endorsed the presidential candidacy of Senator Hillary Clinton on April 28, 2008. After Senator Barack Obama won the Democratic nomination, Easley endorsed him against Republican nominee John McCain.

== Controversies and campaign finance lawsuit ==
Easley was faced with controversies in 2006 stemming from campaign and overseas travel. Easley's wife, Mary Easley, took two trips out of the country, one to France and one to Russia and Estonia, for cultural exchanges. Republican critics called the trips overly lavish in a time of economic downturn for the state. However, the director of the North Carolina Museum of Art defended Mary Easley's trips as having helped the museum receive loaned art items from The Hermitage in St. Petersburg. Mrs. Easley's efforts also resulted in the North Carolina Museum of Art's obtaining a collection of Auguste Rodin's work valued at $35 million, and in the construction of a new Greek art wing for the museum.

More controversy surfaced months after Easley left office in January 2009. According to Raleigh's News & Observer, the Federal Bureau of Investigation ordered the North Carolina Highway Patrol to produce all records involving private air travel for Easley and his family. The newspaper reported that Easley may have violated campaign laws.

The North Carolina State Board of Elections opened hearings into Easley's conduct on October 26, 2009.

Following a two-year federal and state investigation into campaign finance irregularities, Easley entered an Alford plea to a single felony violation of state campaign finance law, accepting responsibility for his campaign's failure to report that he took a $1,600 helicopter ride with a supporter in October 2006. While Easley did not admit guilt, he "acknowledged there was sufficient evidence to convict him of a crime." He pled guilty by entering an Alford plea to a single state campaign finance violation. He paid a $1,000 "community penalty." He became the first governor of North Carolina to have been convicted of a felony. Federal officials ended their investigation because of the plea. Following the conviction, Easley's law license was suspended but formally restored on appeal in January 2013. On January 4, 2013, the Senior Resident Superior Court Judge for Wake County granted Easley a Certificate of relief from disabilities. The conviction was later expunged by the Chief Judge of the Superior Court of Wake County.

== Current activities ==
Easley is a practicing attorney in North Carolina. He represents businesses and corporations and has been involved in several significant civil trials. Politically, in 2018, he joined former North Carolina Governors in successfully opposing state constitutional amendments that would have weakened the powers of the governor. He also joined in the filing of amicus briefs to oppose gerrymandered congressional and legislative districts in North Carolina.

== Personal life ==
Easley is a fan of NASCAR. He was involved in a crash at Lowe's Motor Speedway near Concord, North Carolina, in 2003. He was behind the wheel of Jimmie Johnson's #48 Lowe's Chevrolet Monte Carlo, when it hit a retaining wall going 120 mph. He was not seriously injured, since he was wearing a head-and-neck restraint at the time. He is also a fan of the cartoon King of the Hill, and while governor, instructed his pollster to separate the state's voters into those who watch the show and those who don't. Easley reasoned that his constituents' ideologies were similar to characters on the show, and would base the explanation of his issues on whether or not the King of the Hill characters would understand them or not.

Easley is also an avid amateur woodworker, and appeared on an episode of The Woodwright's Shop where he made a walnut table.

== Electoral history ==
North Carolina Attorney General Election 1992
Party	Candidate	Votes	%	±%
Democratic	Mike Easley	1,530,858	62.96	
Republican	Joe Dean	900,573	37.04	

North Carolina Attorney General Election 1996
Party	Candidate	Votes	%	±%
Democratic	Mike Easley	1,453,196	59.07	
Republican	Robert Edmunds Jr.	1,007,027	40.93	

North Carolina Gubernatorial Election 2000
Party	Candidate	Votes	%	±%
Democratic	Mike Easley	1,492,170	52.4	
Republican	Richard Vinroot	1,335,862	44.2	

North Carolina Gubernatorial Election 2004
Party	Candidate	Votes	%	±%
Democratic	Mike Easley (Incumbent)	1,939,154	56.4	+4.0
Republican	Patrick Ballantine	1,495,021	43.2	

== Works cited ==
- Marcus, Lisa A., ed. (1994). North Carolina Manual 1993–1994 (PDF). Raleigh: North Carolina Secretary of State. OCLC 244121350.

Party political offices
Preceded by Lacy Thornburg	Democratic nominee for Attorney General of North Carolina; 1992, 1996	Succeeded by Roy Cooper
Preceded by Jim Hunt	Democratic nominee for Governor of North Carolina; 2000, 2004	Succeeded by Bev Perdue
Legal offices
Preceded by Lacy Thornburg	Attorney General of North Carolina; 1993–2001	Succeeded by Roy Cooper
Political offices
Preceded by Jim Hunt	Governor of North Carolina; 2001–2009	Succeeded by Bev Perdue
U.S. order of precedence (ceremonial)
Preceded by James G. Martin as Former Governor	Order of precedence of the United States	Succeeded by Bev Perdue as Former Governor
