= Patrick J. Ballantine =

American attorney and politician

Patrick Ballantine
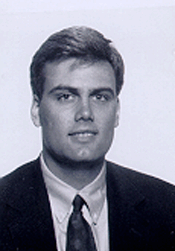

Minority Leader of the North Carolina Senate
- In office January 1, 1999 – January 1, 2005
- Preceded by: Robert Shaw
- Succeeded by: Phil Berger

Member of the North Carolina Senate
- In office January 1, 1995 – April 20, 2004
- Preceded by: John Codington
- Succeeded by: Woody White
- Constituency: 4th district (1995–2003); 9th district (2003–2004)

Personal details
- Born: March 17, 1965 (age 61) Grand Forks, North Dakota, U.S.
- Party: Republican
- Spouse: Lisa Beard (m. 1991)
- Children: 2
- Education: University of North Carolina, Chapel Hill (BA); University of Dayton (JD)

Patrick J. Ballantine (born March 17, 1965) is an American attorney and politician who was a Republican member of the North Carolina General Assembly, rising to become the Senate Minority Leader and the Republican Party's nominee for governor in 2004.

== Early life and education ==
Ballantine was born in Grand Forks, North Dakota, and moved to North Carolina as a child. He graduated from Cape Fear Academy in Wilmington in 1983 and earned a bachelor's degree in political science from the University of North Carolina at Chapel Hill in 1987. Ballantine earned a Juris Doctor from the University of Dayton in 1990.

== Career ==
In 1994, Ballantine became a member of the North Carolina Senate; starting in 1999, he served as the Republican minority leader. He originally represented the state's fourth Senate district, focused on New Hanover County, where he resides in Wilmington. In the redistricting that followed the 2000 census, his district became the ninth.

Ballantine emerged as one of the leading candidates for the Republican gubernatorial nomination to challenge Governor Mike Easley in the 2004 election, although he faced heated competition for the nomination from former Charlotte mayor Richard Vinroot, former Congressman Bill Cobey and Timothy Cook, who withdrew from the Governors race after a few debates to run for Lt Governor finishing runner-up. In July, both Ballantine and Vinroot received 30% of the vote in a six-way Republican primary, with Ballantine edging out Vinroot by only 1,500 votes statewide. Under North Carolina law, Vinroot could have chosen to seek a runoff; however, he elected not to exercise that option, leaving Ballantine the Republican nominee.

Ballantine stepped down from his General Assembly seat in April in order to focus on his run for governor. His law partner Woody White was appointed to fill his Senate seat, but was defeated in the general election by Democrat Julia Boseman.

Ballantine's campaign focused on his youth, optimism, and vision, offering what he referred to as "A New Generation of Conservative Leadership" for North Carolina; however, Easley's campaign focused on Ballatine's Senate voting record. Ballantine was bested by Easley, the incumbent, by a thirteen-point margin in the November 2004 general election.

== Personal life ==
He married Lisa Beard on August 10, 1991. They have two children.

North Carolina Senate
Preceded by Robert Shaw	Minority Leader of the North Carolina Senate; 1999–2005	Succeeded by Phil Berger
Party political offices
Preceded by Richard Vinroot	Republican nominee for Governor of North Carolina; 2004	Succeeded by Pat McCrory
