= Richard Vinroot =

American politician (born 1941)

52nd Mayor of Charlotte
- In office 1991–1995
- Preceded by: Sue Myrick
- Succeeded by: Pat McCrory

Personal details
- Born: April 14, 1941 (age 85) Charlotte, North Carolina, U.S.
- Party: Republican
- Education: University of North Carolina, Chapel Hill (BA, JD)

Richard A. Vinroot (born April 14, 1941) is an American politician and attorney from Charlotte, North Carolina. He served as the 52nd Mayor of Charlotte from 1991 to 1995. Vinroot ran unsuccessfully for Governor of North Carolina in 1996, 2000 and 2004. The City of Charlotte's Richard Vinroot International Achievement Award is named in his honor.

== Early life ==
The son of a Swedish immigrant, Richard Vinroot was raised in Mecklenburg County schools, becoming student body president at East Mecklenburg High School, where he graduated from in 1959. He was a high school athlete in three sports and captained the basketball and football teams. He won a Morehead Scholarship to attend the University of North Carolina at Chapel Hill, where he earned a bachelor's degree in 1963 and a Juris Doctor degree in 1966. He served as class president in his junior and senior years. Vinroot's height is billed at 6'7", and he played college basketball for the North Carolina Tar Heels under Dean Smith.

Vinroot married his wife Judy (Allen) Vinroot, whom he met while both were students at University of North Carolina. They have three children, Richard Vinroot Jr., Laura Vinroot Poole, and Katy Vinroot O'Brien, all of whom graduated from UNC-Chapel Hill.

== Military ==
From January 1967 to 1968, he was in the United States Army where he served in the 1st Signal Brigade. After basic training at Fort Bragg, he was stationed at Fort Jackson, South Carolina for six months. In November 1967, he deployed to Vietnam during the Vietnam War and was awarded a Bronze Star Medal. While in Vietnam, he did legal assistance as part of the Judge Advocate Department of the 1st Signal Brigade.

== Political career ==
Vinroot was a member of the Charlotte City Council from 1983 to 1991 and served as mayor of Charlotte from 1991 to 1995. As mayor, Vinroot was successful in establishing a Taxpayer Protection Act, limiting growth of the city's budget. He created the state's first "drug court" to speed prosecutions. He established the Mayor's International Cabinet, a predecessor to the Charlotte International Cabinet. A national magazine named him Municipal Leader of the Year. Vinroot decided against running for a third term in order to focus full-time on his first run for North Carolina governor in 1996. Vinroot lost in a close primary to then-state representative Robin Hayes of Kannapolis. Hayes went on to lose the general election to incumbent governor Jim Hunt.

Vinroot ran again for governor in 2000, and secured the Republican nomination over state representative N. Leo Daughtry. He faced North Carolina's attorney general, Mike Easley, in a bitterly contested election. Despite a favorable national Republican tide that won North Carolina for George W. Bush, Democrat Mike Easley won by 52% to 46%, and succeeded fellow Democrat Jim Hunt as governor. In the closing weeks of the race, actor Andy Griffith filmed an ad endorsing Easley, which some observers believe led to Easley's victory, called the "Mayberry Miracle".

In 2004, Vinroot attempted a third run for governor, but never made it past the Republican primary. He conceded the race to Wilmington State Senator Patrick J. Ballantine, who lost to Easley in November, 55.62% to 42.88%.

Since his retirement from politics, Vinroot has served on the boards of Martin-Marietta Materials, Inc. and the North Carolina Institute for Emerging Issues. He also was appointed to the search committee for the next chancellor of the University of North Carolina at Chapel Hill in 2012.

== Legal practice ==
Vinroot's legal practice at the Charlotte-based firm of Robinson, Bradshaw & Hinson concentrates in the areas of civil litigation including construction, labor, employment discrimination, and commercial disputes and controversies.

== Richard Vinroot International Achievement Award ==
The Richard Vinroot International Achievement Award is presented by the City of Charlotte to recognize those who "have worked for the continued internationalization of Charlotte... contributed to efforts to improve the international community... and have a record of outstanding service to the greater Charlotte community." Recipients are chosen by the Mayor of Charlotte and the award is presented annually at the Mayor's International Community Awards event each spring. Recipients have included prominent leaders in government, non-profits, and academia.

== Notes ==
Political offices
Preceded by Sue Myrick	Mayor of Charlotte; 1991–1995	Succeeded by Pat McCrory
Party political offices
Preceded by Robin Hayes	Republican nominee for Governor of North Carolina; 2000	Succeeded by Patrick Ballantine
