= Certificate of relief from disabilities =

U.S. legal document

A certificate of relief from disabilities is issued by the state of the United States of America to a person who has committed a felony or misdemeanor but has subsequently shown that he or she has been rehabilitated. The closely related "certificate of good conduct" is given to a person who has committed two or more felonies and has demonstrated rehabilitation. Potential employers or licensing authorities must consider these certificates as evidence that the person is rehabilitated: if a person has such a certificate, the fact that they were convicted cannot be used as a reason to deny them employment or the granting of a license. Not all states offer such certificates.
