= 1996 North Carolina gubernatorial election =

- November 5, 1996
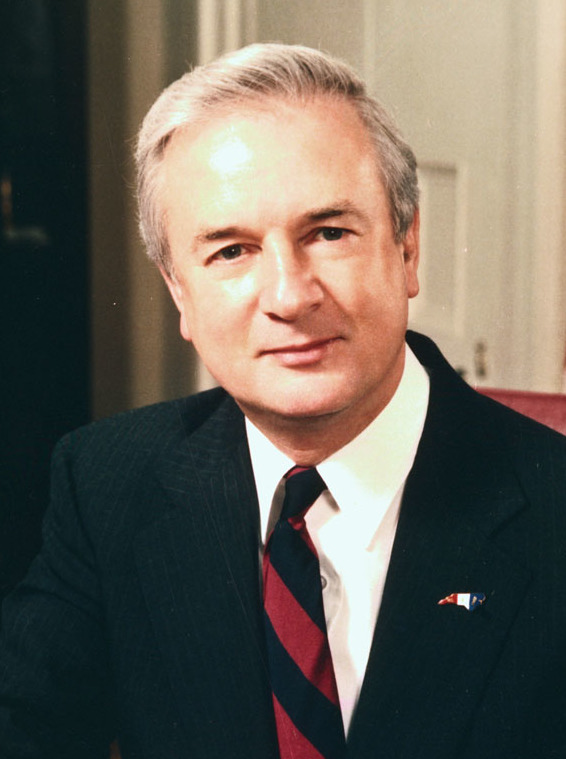

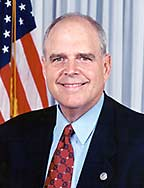
Nominee	Jim Hunt	Robin Hayes
Party	Democratic	Republican
Popular vote	1,436,638	1,097,053
Percentage	55.98%	42.75%
- County results Hunt: 40–50% 50–60% 60–70% 70–80% Hayes: 40–50% 50–60% 60–70%
Governor before election
Jim Hunt
Democratic
Elected Governor
Jim Hunt
Democratic

The 1996 North Carolina gubernatorial election was held on 5 November 1996. Incumbent Democratic governor Jim Hunt was elected to a fourth term in office over Republican state representative Robin Hayes.

== Background ==
At the time, North Carolina was considered a swing state which elected both Democratic and Republican candidates to state and federal offices. The 1996 election was held alongside the presidential election of 1996, in which Democratic incumbent Bill Clinton sought re-election to a second term. Clinton had been severely unpopular early in his first term, leading to the "Republican Revolution" in the 1994 midterm elections, but his popularity had rebounded by 1996. Republicans gained four of North Carolina's seats in the United States House of Representatives in 1994.

=== Campaign finance ===
From 1976 to 1994, the cost of winning elections in North Carolina increased consistently. The nonpartisan North Carolina Alliance to Democracy highlighted this in a statement to the Election Reform Committee in 1995, arguing that then-existing campaign finance laws in the state were "nearly worthless" and allowed special interests to influence North Carolina elections.

=== Voter registration ===
Ahead of the election, North Carolina passed legislation to comply with the national Voting Rights Act. Further legislation to address technical issues was stalled in 1995 due to disagreements between the Senate and House of Representatives.

=== Ballot access ===
At the time, North Carolina had some of the most restrictive ballot access laws in the United States, making it difficult for minor parties to gain ballot access. For example, a party was required to achieve 10 percent of the total vote in a gubernatorial or presidential election to receive automatic access to the next ballot. Despite the relatively strong third-place performance of the Libertarian Party in 1992, this meant that the party was required to gather signatures to petition for ballot access.

== Democratic primary ==
=== Candidates ===
- Jim Hunt, incumbent governor of North Carolina since 1993 (Note: Hunt previously served as governor from 1977 to 1985.)

=== Results ===
Jim Hunt won the Democratic nomination unopposed.

== Republican primary ==
=== Candidates ===
- Robin Hayes, state representative from Cabarrus County
- Art Manning
- Ken Rogers
- Richard Vinroot, former mayor of Charlotte

=== Campaign ===
Hayes attacked Vinroot for being too moderate and for his past support of Planned Parenthood. Vinroot claimed the attacks where "character assassination" and accused the Hayes campaign of hitting "below the belt."

=== Results ===
1996 North Carolina gubernatorial Republican primary election
Party	Candidate	Votes	%	±%
Republican	Robin Hayes	140,351	50.20	
Republican	Richard Vinroot	127,916	45.75	
Republican	Ken Rogers	6,101	2.18	
Republican	Art Manning	5,242	1.87	
Turnout		279,610	100.00	

== General election ==
=== Candidates ===
- Jim Hunt, incumbent governor of North Carolina since 1993 (Democratic)
- Robin Hayes, state representative from Cabarrus County (Republican)
- Julia Van Witt (Natural Law)
- Scott D. Yost (Libertarian)

=== Campaign ===
Hunt emphasized his record of leadership in state politics, his support for public education (including the "Start Smart" program) and infrastructure improvements, and economic development.

Hayes received strong support from Christian conservatives and opponents of abortion. During the campaign, he emphasized his support for existing concealed handgun permitting laws and proposed abolishing the state's four-percent sales tax on food. He also emphasized his support for welfare reform, criminal prosecution, fiscal restraint, and improvements to public education.

Hayes criticized Hunt for his excessive spending on his campaign.

=== Debates ===
- North Carolina Gubernatorial Debate | October 19, 1996. C-SPAN Oct 21, 1996
- North Carolina Gubernatorial Debate | October 26, 1996 C-SPAN Oct 29, 1996

=== Results ===
1996 North Carolina gubernatorial election
Party	Candidate	Votes	%	±%
Democratic	Jim Hunt (incumbent)	1,436,638	55.98	
Republican	Robin Hayes	1,097,053	42.75	
Libertarian	Scott D. Yost	17,559	0.68	
Natural Law	Julia Van Witt	14,792	0.58	
Turnout		2,566,042		
Democratic hold		Swing		

A key factor of Hunt’s success was his performance in urban areas versus Hayes’ support in rural regions.
