= 2012 North Carolina gubernatorial election =

- November 6, 2012
- Turnout: 67.30%
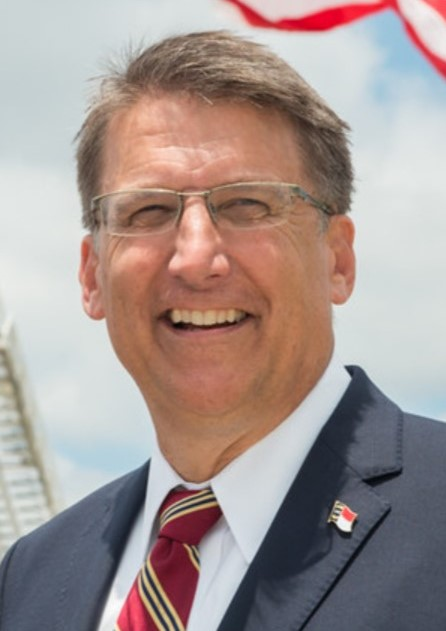

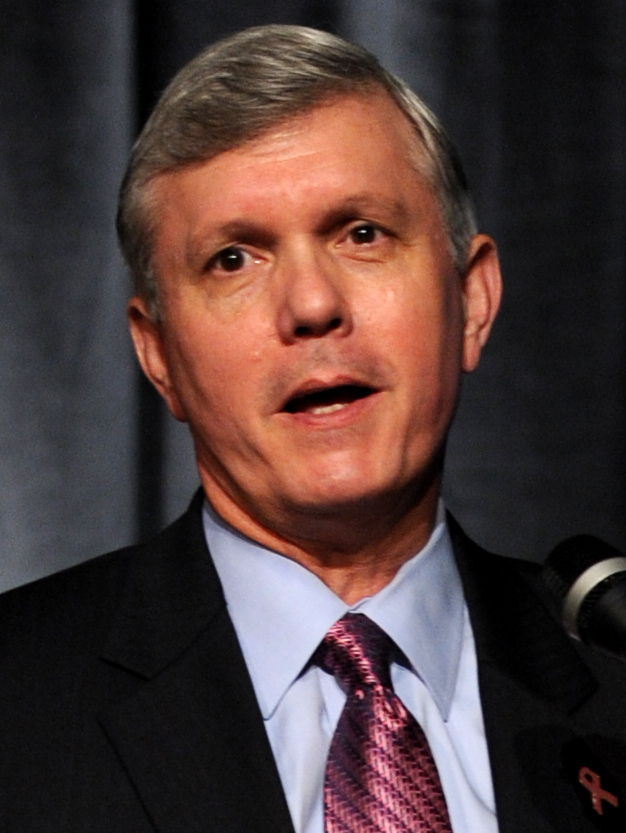
Nominee	Pat McCrory	Walter Dalton
Party	Republican	Democratic
Popular vote	2,440,707	1,931,580
Percentage	54.62%	43.23%
- McCrory: 40–50% 50–60% 60–70% 70–80% 80–90% >90% Dalton: 40–50% 50–60% 60–70% 70–80% 80–90% >90% Tie: 40–50%
Governor before election
Bev Perdue
Democratic
Elected Governor
Pat McCrory
Republican

The 2012 North Carolina gubernatorial election took place on November 6, 2012, concurrently with the 2012 United States presidential election, U.S. House election, statewide judicial election, Council of State election, and various local elections.

Incumbent Democratic Governor Bev Perdue was eligible to run for re-election, but announced on January 26, 2012 that she would not seek a second term. Incumbent lieutenant governor Walter Dalton won the Democratic nomination, while former mayor of Charlotte and 2008 gubernatorial nominee Pat McCrory won the Republican nomination. McCrory won the election with almost 55 percent of the vote to Dalton's 43 percent, the largest margin of victory for a Republican in a race for governor in history, surpassing the previous record set in 1868. McCory also outperformed (by 9.35%) Republican presidential nominee Mitt Romney’s victory margin in the concurrent presidential race.

Libertarian nominee Barbara Howe took 2% of the vote. When McCrory was inaugurated as the 74th governor of North Carolina on January 5, 2013, he became the state's first Republican governor since 1993 and the Republicans held complete control of state government for the first time since 1871. As of 2026, this is the last time a Republican was elected governor of North Carolina, and the only time since 1988. It was also the last time the state concurrently voted for a gubernatorial and presidential candidate of the same party, and the last time a Republican candidate won Mecklenburg County in a statewide election.

== Democratic primary ==
=== Candidates ===
- Bruce Blackmon, physician
- Walter Dalton, lieutenant governor
- Gary M. Dunn, salesman and UNC-Charlotte student
- Bob Etheridge, former U.S. representative
- Bill Faison, state representative
- Gardenia Henley, retired U.S. Agency for International Development auditor

==== Declined ====
- Dan Blue, state senator
- Erskine Bowles, chairman of the National Commission on Fiscal Responsibility and Reform, former UNC System president, former White House chief of staff
- Roy Cooper, attorney general of North Carolina
- Janet Cowell, state treasurer
- Cal Cunningham, former state senator
- Anthony Foxx, mayor of Charlotte
- Kay Hagan, U.S. senator
- Jim Hunt, former governor
- Allen Joines, mayor of Winston-Salem
- Mike McIntyre, U.S. representative
- Brad Miller, U.S. representative
- Richard H. Moore, former North Carolina state treasurer and candidate for governor in 2008
- Bev Perdue, incumbent governor
- Heath Shuler, U.S. representative

=== Polling ===
Poll source	Date(s) administered	Sample size	Margin of error	Bruce Blackmon	Walter Dalton	Gary Dunn	Bob Etheridge	Bill Faison	Gardenia Henley	Undecided
Public Policy Polling	May 5–6, 2012	500	± 3.1%	2%	34%	4%	29%	4%	4%	24%
Survey USA	April 26–30, 2012	560	± 4.2%	2%	32%	5%	23%	5%	3%	30%
Public Policy Polling	April 27–29, 2012	500	± 4.4%	3%	36%	2%	26%	5%	3%	25%
Civitas/Survey USA	April 20–23, 2012	448	± 4.7%	3%	32%	3%	27%	4%	2%	27%
Public Policy Polling	April 20–22, 2012	500	± 4.4%	4%	26%	4%	25%	5%	2%	35%
Public Policy Polling	March 23–25, 2012	505	± 4.4%	5%	15%	4%	26%	3%	2%	45%
Public Policy Polling	February 29 – March 1, 2012	499	± 4.4%	5%	19%	2%	26%	2%	4%	41%

Poll source	Date(s) administered	Sample size	Margin of error	Dan Blue	Walter Dalton	Bob Etheridge	Bill Faison	Mike McIntyre	Brad Miller	Richard Moore	Undecided
Public Policy Polling	February 3–5, 2012	400	± 4.9%	13%	10%	21%	2%	6%	8%	7%	33%
Public Policy Polling	February 3–5, 2012	400	± 4.9%	11%	20%	24%	4%	—	—	—	41%
Public Policy Polling	February 3–5, 2012	400	± 4.9%	—	22%	25%	6%	7%	—	—	40%
Public Policy Polling	February 3–5, 2012	400	± 4.9%	—	20%	24%	4%	—	11%	—	41%
Public Policy Polling	February 3–5, 2012	400	± 4.9%	—	21%	24%	5%	—	—	8%	41%
Public Policy Polling	February 3–5, 2012	400	± 4.9%	—	24%	30%	6%	—	—	—	39%

=== Debates ===
A series of televised debates between candidates Dalton, Etheridge and Faison, held April 16–18, was considered potentially pivotal, since "the governor’s race has so far attracted little attention, created little buzz and produced few political commercials" and "polls suggest there is still a large swath of Democratic voters who have yet to decide" for whom to vote. The first debate, conducted by WRAL-TV and broadcast statewide, featured few differences between the candidates, but Faison was seen as the aggressor. The second debate (conducted by UNC-TV) was more contentious, with Dalton criticizing Etheridge's support of a free trade agreement while he was in Congress, and Etheridge attacking Dalton over his attendance record on boards and commissions and his alleged failure to speak out against the actions of the majority-Republican legislature. In the final debate of the series, this one conducted by WNCN-TV and the North Carolina League of Women Voters, candidates were considered to be more "muted" in their criticisms of each other. All three spoke out strongly against a voter ID bill proposed by Republicans in the state legislature. Dalton emphasized modernizing the state's economy, Etheridge continued his themes of leadership and education, and Faison most sharply attacked Republicans and called for action on the state's unemployment problem.

=== Results ===
Primary results by county: Dalton: Dalton—81–90%; Dalton—71–80%; Dalton—61–70%; Dalton—51–60%; Dalton—41–50%; Dalton—31–40%; Etheridge: Etheridge—61–70%; Etheridge—51–60%; Etheridge—41–50%; Etheridge—31–40%; Faison: Faison—41–50%

Democratic primary results
Party	Candidate	Votes	%
Democratic	Walter Dalton	425,618	45.8
Democratic	Bob Etheridge	353,209	38.0
Democratic	Bill Faison	51,759	5.6
Democratic	Gardenia Henley	48,402	5.2
Democratic	Gary M. Dunn	27,163	2.9
Democratic	Bruce Blackmon	22,158	2.4
Total votes		928,309	100.0

== Republican primary ==
=== Candidates ===
- Jim Harney, businessman
- Scott Jones, businessman
- Jim Mahan, small businessman and former teacher
- Pat McCrory, former mayor of Charlotte and nominee for governor in 2008
- Charles Kenneth Moss, businessman and preacher
- Paul Wright, attorney and former District Court and Superior Court judge

==== Declined ====
- Phil Berger, state senate president pro tem
- Cherie Berry, state labor commissioner (running for re-election)
- Peter Brunstetter, state senator
- Paul Coble, former mayor of Raleigh and current chairman of the Wake County Board of Commissioners (running for Congress)
- Steve Troxler, state agriculture commissioner (running for re-election)

=== Polling ===
Poll source	Date(s) administered	Sample size	Margin of error	Jim Harney	Scott Jones	Jim Mahan	Pat McCrory	Charles Moss	Paul Wright	Undecided
Public Policy Polling	May 5–6, 2012	496	± 4.4%	2%	3%	2%	70%	1%	2%	20%
Survey USA	April 26–30, 2012	451	± 4.5%	3%	3%	2%	65%	3%	2%	21%
Public Policy Polling	April 27–29, 2012	486	± 4.4%	4%	2%	2%	66%	0%	2%	24%
Public Policy Polling	April 20–22, 2012	521	± 4.3%	3%	1%	2%	67%	1%	2%	23%
Public Policy Polling	March 22–25, 2012	561	± 4.1%	2%	1%	3%	64%	2%	0%	28%

Poll source	Date(s) administered	Sample size	Margin of error	Pat McCrory	Someone more conservative	Other	Undecided
Public Policy Polling	September 1–4, 2011	400	± 4.9%	40%	46%	—	15%

Poll source	Date(s) administered	Sample size	Margin of error	Phil Berger	Cherie Berry	Tom Fetzer	Virginia Foxx	Pat McCrory	Patrick McHenry	Sue Myrick	Fred Smith	Other/ Undecided
Public Policy Polling	November 19–21, 2010	400	± 4.9%	2%	3%	12%	11%	37%	3%	6%	4%	22%

=== Results ===
Republican primary results
Party	Candidate	Votes	%
Republican	Pat McCrory	744,226	83.4
Republican	Paul Wright	46,986	5.3
Republican	Scott Jones	30,884	3.5
Republican	Jim Mahan	29,794	3.3
Republican	Jim Harney	26,242	2.9
Republican	Charles Kenneth Moss	13,696	1.5
Total votes		891,828	100.0

== General election ==
=== Candidates ===
- Walter Dalton (D), lieutenant governor
- Barbara Howe (L), nominee for governor in 2000 and 2004
- Pat McCrory (R), former mayor of Charlotte and nominee for governor in 2008

=== Predictions ===
Source	Ranking	As of
The Cook Political Report	Lean R (flip)	November 1, 2012
Sabato's Crystal Ball	Likely R (flip)	November 5, 2012
Rothenberg Political Report	Likely R (flip)	November 2, 2012
Real Clear Politics	Likely R (flip)	November 5, 2012

=== Debates ===
- Complete video of debate, October 3, 2012 - C-SPAN
- Complete video of debate, October 16, 2012 - C-SPAN
- Complete video of debate, October 24, 2012 - C-SPAN

Dalton and McCrory met for their first televised debate at the studios of UNC-TV on October 3, 2012. Two debates were sponsored by the North Carolina Association of Broadcasters Educational Foundation, with the third and final debate sponsored by WRAL-TV and the Rocky Mount Chamber of Commerce. Howe was not invited to participate in any of the scheduled debates. The Associated Press characterized Dalton as going "on the offensive" against McCrory in the first debate. The final encounter between the two candidates, held Oct. 24 on the campus of North Carolina Wesleyan College, featured "more subdued disagreements over taxes, education, health care and mental health."

=== Polling ===
Poll source	Date(s) administered	Sample size	Margin of error	Walter Dalton (D)	Pat McCrory (R)	Barbara Howe (L)	Other	Undecided
Public Policy Polling	November 3–4, 2012	926	± 3.2%	43%	50%	4%	—	3%
Public Policy Polling	October 29–31, 2012	730	± 3.6%	39%	50%	4%	—	7%
WRAL News/SurveyUSA	October 26–29, 2012	682	± 3.8%	36%	53%	—	—	11%
Elon University	October 21–26, 2012	1,238	± 2.8%	38%	52%	—	2%	8%
Rasmussen Reports	October 25, 2012	500	± 4.5%	35%	54%	—	1%	10%
Public Policy Polling	October 23–25, 2012	880	± 3.3%	37%	50%	5%	—	8%
Rasmussen Reports	October 17, 2012	500	± 4.5%	42%	53%	—	—	4%
Public Policy Polling	October 12–14, 2012	1,084	± 3%	37%	47%	5%	—	11%
Rasmussen Reports	October 9, 2012	500	± 4.5%	38%	52%	—	—	10%
Gravis Marketing	October 6–8, 2012	1,325	± 2.9%	33%	50%	—	—	17%
Rasmussen Reports	October 2, 2012	500	± 4.5%	38%	54%	—	1%	7%
Survey USA	September 29 – October 1, 2012	573	± 4.2%	39%	51%	3%	—	7%
Public Policy Polling	September 27–30, 2012	981	± 3.1%	37%	47%	5%	—	10%
WSJ/NBC News/Marist	September 23–25, 2012	1,035	± 3.4%	39%	52%	—	—	8%
Civitas	September 18–19, 2012	600	± 4%	38%	49%	3%	—	10%
Rasmussen Reports	September 13, 2012	500	± 3.4%	38%	51%	1%	—	10%
Survey USA/Civitas	September 4–6, 2012	500	± 3.4%	39%	55%	4%	—	29%
Public Policy Polling	August 31 – September 2, 2012	1,012	± 3.4%	39%	45%	5%	—	10%
Elon Univ./Charlotte Observer	August 25–30, 2012	1,089	± 3.4%	37%	52%	—	—	11%
Public Policy Polling	August 2–5, 2012	813	± 3.4%	38%	45%	7%	—	11%
Rasmussen Reports	July 27, 2012	500	± 4.5%	41%	46%	—	3%	10%
Civitas	July 16–18, 2012	600	± 4%	37%	47%	6%	—	4%
Public Policy Polling	July 5–8, 2012	775	± 3.5%	36%	43%	9%	—	12%
Survey USA	June 29 – July 1, 2012	558	± 4.2%	44%	46%	7%	—	3%
Rasmussen Reports	June 25, 2012	500	± 4.5%	35%	49%	—	4%	12%
NBC News/Marist	June 24–25, 2012	1,019	± 3.1%	41%	43%	—	—	17%
Public Policy Polling	June 7–10, 2012	810	± 3.4%	40%	47%	—	—	13%
Survey USA	May 18–21, 2012	524	± 4.4%	39%	44%	7%	—	10%
Civitas	May 19–20, 2012	600	± 4%	38%	48%	—	—	12%
Rasmussen Reports	May 14, 2012	500	± 4.5%	41%	50%	—	1%	8%
Public Policy Polling	May 10–13, 2012	666	± 3.8%	40%	46%	—	—	13%
Rasmussen Reports	April 10, 2012	500	± 4.5%	36%	45%	—	5%	14%
Public Policy Polling	March 8–11, 2012	804	± 3.5%	35%	46%	—	—	19%
Civitas	February 27–28, 2012	600	± 4%	29%	49%	—	—	22%
Public Policy Polling	January 27–29, 2012	554	± 4.2%	35%	50%	—	—	15%
Public Policy Polling	September 30 – October 3, 2011	760	± 3.6%	32%	46%	—	—	23%
Public Policy Polling	March 17–20, 2011	584	± 4.1%	27%	47%	—	—	26%

Hypothetical polling

Democratic primary polling with Perdue

Poll source	Date(s) administered	Sample size	Margin of error	Bill Faison	Bev Perdue	Other	Undecided
Public Policy Polling	December 1–4, 2011	392	± 5.0%	23%	55%	—	23%
Public Policy Polling	September 30 – October 3, 2011	353	± 3.6%	18%	62%	—	20%

Republican primary with Ellmers, Troxler

Poll source	Date(s) administered	Sample size	Margin of error	Renee Ellmers	Pat McCrory	Steve Troxler	Other	Undecided
Public Policy Polling	September 1–4, 2011	400	± 4.9%	10%	61%	—	—	29%
Public Policy Polling	September 1–4, 2011	400	± 4.9%	—	51%	15%	—	34%
Public Policy Polling	September 1–4, 2011	400	± 4.9%	10%	52%	19%	—	19%

General election polling
With Blue

Poll source	Date(s) administered	Sample size	Margin of error	Dan Blue (D)	Pat McCrory (R)	Other	Undecided
Public Policy Polling	January 27–29, 2012	554	± 4.2%	31%	49%	—	19%
Public Policy Polling	March 17–20, 2011	584	± 4.1%	28%	48%	—	16%

With Blackmon

Poll source	Date(s) administered	Sample size	Margin of error	Bruce Blackmon (D)	Pat McCrory (R)	Other	Undecided
Public Policy Polling	March 8–11, 2012	804	± 3.5%	33%	48%	—	18%

With Bowles

Poll source	Date(s) administered	Sample size	Margin of error	Erskine Bowles (D)	Pat McCrory (R)	Other	Undecided
Public Policy Polling	January 27–29, 2012	554	± 4.2%	42%	44%	—	14%
Public Policy Polling	September 30 – October 3, 2011	760	± 3.6%	42%	42%	—	16%

With Cooper

Poll source	Date(s) administered	Sample size	Margin of error	Roy Cooper (D)	Pat McCrory (R)	Other	Undecided
Public Policy Polling	September 30 – October 3, 2011	760	± 3.6%	39%	42%	—	19%
Public Policy Polling	March 17–20, 2011	584	± 4.1%	35%	43%	—	22%

With Foxx

Poll source	Date(s) administered	Sample size	Margin of error	Anthony Foxx (D)	Pat McCrory (R)	Other	Undecided
Public Policy Polling	January 27–29, 2012	554	± 4.2%	32%	50%	—	18%

With Etheridge

Poll source	Date(s) administered	Sample size	Margin of error	Bob Etheridge (D)	Pat McCrory (R)	Other	Undecided
Public Policy Polling	March 8–11, 2012	804	± 3.5%	36%	46%	—	18%
Public Policy Polling	January 27–29, 2012	554	± 4.2%	35%	50%	—	16%

With Faison

Poll source	Date(s) administered	Sample size	Margin of error	Bill Faison (D)	Pat McCrory (R)	Other	Undecided
Public Policy Polling	January 27–29, 2012	554	± 4.2%	31%	50%	—	19%
Public Policy Polling	January 5–8, 2012	780	± 3.5%	27%	47%	—	26%
Public Policy Polling	December 1–4, 2011	865	± 3.3%	26%	47%	—	26%
Public Policy Polling	September 30 – October 3, 2011	760	± 3.6%	30%	45%	—	25%

With Henley

Poll source	Date(s) administered	Sample size	Margin of error	Gardenia Henley (D)	Pat McCrory (R)	Other	Undecided
Public Policy Polling	March 8–11, 2012	804	± 3.5%	29%	49%	—	22%

With Hagan

Poll source	Date(s) administered	Sample size	Margin of error	Kay Hagan (D)	Pat McCrory (R)	Other	Undecided
Public Policy Polling	January 27–29, 2012	554	± 4.2%	41%	48%	—	11%

With Joines

Poll source	Date(s) administered	Sample size	Margin of error	Allan Joines (D)	Pat McCrory (R)	Other	Undecided
Public Policy Polling	January 27–29, 2012	554	± 4.2%	30%	50%	—	21%

With McIntyre

Poll source	Date(s) administered	Sample size	Margin of error	Mike McIntyre (D)	Pat McCrory (R)	Other	Undecided
Public Policy Polling	January 27–29, 2012	554	± 4.2%	30%	50%	—	20%

With Meeker

Poll source	Date(s) administered	Sample size	Margin of error	Charles Meeker (D)	Pat McCrory (R)	Other	Undecided
Public Policy Polling	January 27–29, 2012	554	± 4.2%	29%	49%	—	22%

With Miller

Poll source	Date(s) administered	Sample size	Margin of error	Brad Miller (D)	Pat McCrory (R)	Other	Undecided
Public Policy Polling	January 27–29, 2012	554	± 4.2%	35%	49%	—	16%

With Moore

Poll source	Date(s) administered	Sample size	Margin of error	Richard Moore (D)	Pat McCrory (R)	Other	Undecided
Public Policy Polling	January 27–29, 2012	554	± 4.2%	36%	47%	—	17%

With Perdue

Poll source	Date(s) administered	Sample size	Margin of error	Bev Perdue (D)	Renee Ellmers (R)	Other	Undecided
Public Policy Polling	September 1–4, 2011	520	± 4.3%	45%	35%	—	20%

Poll source	Date(s) administered	Sample size	Margin of error	Bev Perdue (D)	Tom Fetzer (R)	Other	Undecided
Public Policy Polling	November 19–21, 2010	517	± 4.3%	40%	42%	—	19%

Poll source	Date(s) administered	Sample size	Margin of error	Bev Perdue (D)	Pat McCrory (R)	Other	Undecided
Public Policy Polling	January 5–8, 2012	780	± 3.5%	41%	52%	—	7%
Public Policy Polling	December 1–4, 2011	865	± 3.3%	40%	50%	—	10%
Public Policy Polling	October 27–31, 2011	615	± 4.0%	39%	48%	—	13%
Public Policy Polling	September 30 – October 3, 2011	760	± 3.6%	42%	47%	—	10%
Public Policy Polling	September 1–4, 2011	520	± 4.3%	41%	45%	—	14%
Public Policy Polling	August 4–7, 2011	780	± 3.5%	39%	47%	—	14%
Civitas Institute	July 12–13, 2011	600	± 4.0%	35%	55%	—	8%
Public Policy Polling	July 7–10, 2011	651	± 3.8%	39%	47%	—	14%
Public Policy Polling	June 8–11, 2011	563	± 4.1%	39%	45%	—	16%
Public Policy Polling	May 12–15, 2011	835	± 3.4%	39%	46%	—	15%
Public Policy Polling	April 14–17, 2011	507	± 4.4%	38%	49%	—	13%
Survey USA	April 14–15, 2011	500	± 4.5%	39%	51%	5%	4%
Public Policy Polling	March 17–20, 2011	584	± 4.1%	36%	50%	—	14%
Public Policy Polling	February 16–21, 2011	650	± 3.8%	37%	49%	—	15%
Public Policy Polling	January 20–23, 2011	575	± 4.1%	40%	47%	—	14%
Civitas Institute	December 15–16, 2010	600	± 4.0%	36%	51%	—	12%
Public Policy Polling	November 19–21, 2010	517	± 4.3%	37%	49%	—	14%
Civitas Institute	June 15–18, 2010	600	± 4.0%	37%	46%	—	17%

Poll source	Date(s) administered	Sample size	Margin of error	Bev Perdue (D)	Steve Troxler (R)	Other	Undecided
Public Policy Polling	September 1–4, 2011	520	± 4.3%	42%	37%	—	22%

With Shuler

Poll source	Date(s) administered	Sample size	Margin of error	Heath Shuler (D)	Pat McCrory (R)	Other	Undecided
Public Policy Polling	January 27–29, 2012	554	± 4.2%	31%	48%	—	21%

=== Results ===
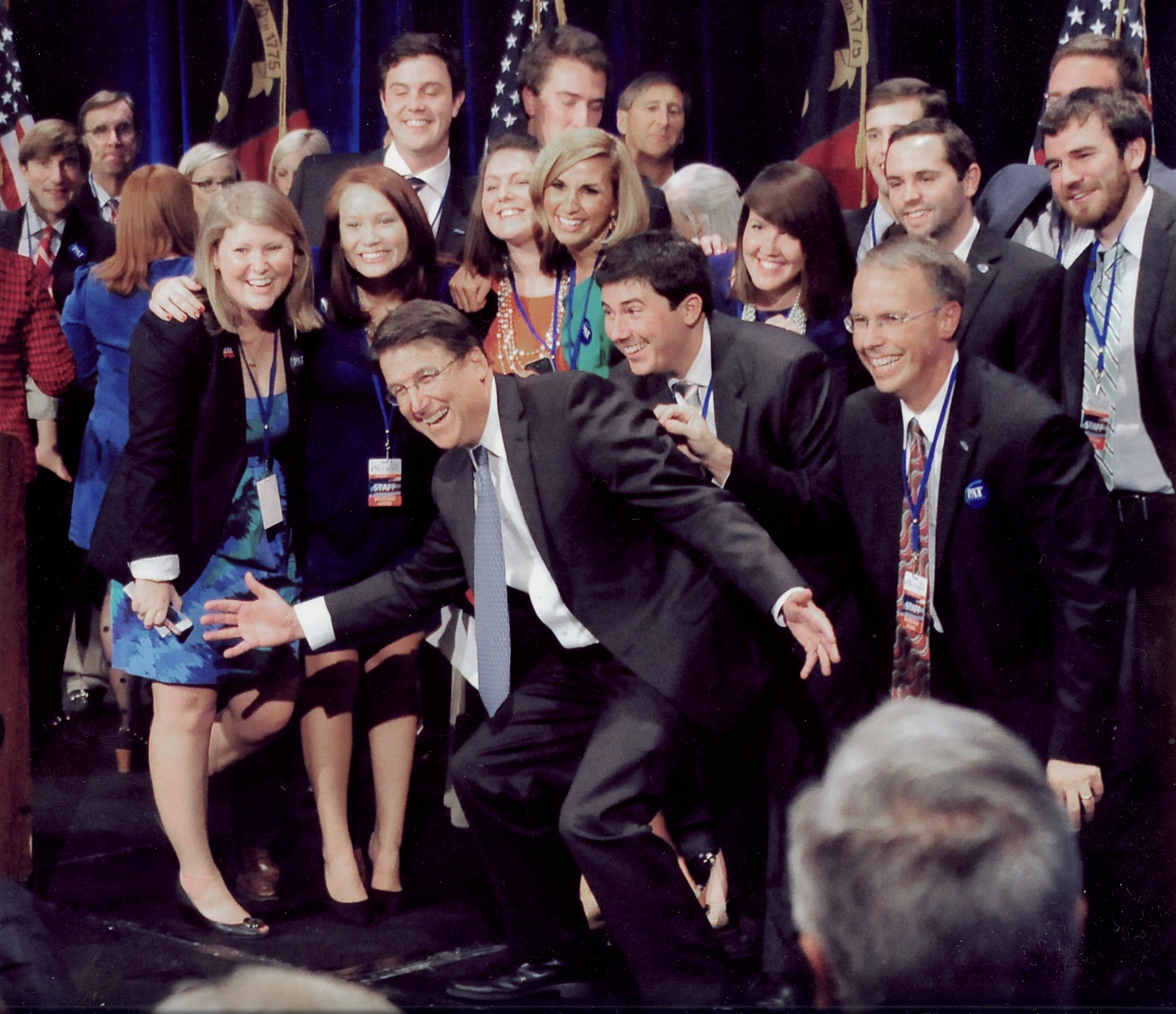
Pat McCrory celebrating his election victory

2012 North Carolina gubernatorial election
Party	Candidate	Votes	%	±%
Republican	Pat McCrory	2,440,707	54.62%	+7.74%
Democratic	Walter Dalton	1,931,580	43.23%	−7.04%
Libertarian	Barbara Howe	94,652	2.12%	−0.73%
Write-in		1,356	0.03%	N/A
Total votes		4,468,295	100.00%	N/A
Republican gain from Democratic				

==== Counties that flipped from Democratic to Republican ====
- Alleghany (largest town: Sparta)
- Beaufort (largest city: Washington)
- Caswell (v city: Yanceyville)
- Chatham (largest municipality: Siler City)
- Chowan (largest municipality: Edenton)
- Columbus (largest municipality: Whiteville)
- Craven (largest town: New Bern)
- Dare (largest city: Kill Devil Hills)
- Duplin (largest city: Wallace)
- Forsyth (largest town: Winston-Salem)
- Franklin (largest city: Wake Forest)
- Granville (largest city: Oxford)
- Greene (largest municipality: Snow Hill)
- Haywood (largest city: Waynesville)
- Hyde (largest community: Ocracoke)
- Jackson (largest town: Cullowhee)
- Jones (largest city: Maysville)
- Lee (largest municipality: Sanford)
- Lenoir (largest town: Kinston)
- Madison (largest city: Mars Hill)
- Mecklenburg (largest city: Charlotte)
- Montgomery (largest city: Troy)
- Nash (largest municipality: Rocky Mount)
- New Hanover (largest municipality: Wilmington)
- Onslow (largest town: Jacksonville)
- Pamlico (largest town: Bayboro)
- Perquimans (Largest city: Hertford)
- Person (largest municipality: Roxboro)
- Richmond (largest city: Rockingham)
- Rockingham (largest municipality: Eden)
- Sampson (largest municipality: Clinton)
- Swain (largest municipality: Cherokee)
- Tyrrell (largest municipality: Columbia)
- Wake (largest town: Raleigh)
- Watauga (largest city: Boone)
- Wayne (largest town: Goldsboro)
- Yancey (largest municipality: Burnsville)

==== By congressional district ====
McCrory won ten of the state's 13 congressional districts, including one held by a Democrat.

District	McCrory	Dalton	Representative
1st	29.35%	69.26%	G. K. Butterfield
2nd	60.13%	37.63%	Renee Ellmers
3rd	59.34%	38.22%	Walter B. Jones Jr.
4th	31.29%	65.74%	David Price
5th	63.66%	34.12%	Virginia Foxx
6th	61.21%	36.51%	Howard Coble
7th	61.37%	36.63%	Mike McIntyre
8th	62.7%	35.59%	Larry Kissell
8th	62.7%	35.59%	Richard Hudson
9th	67.81%	30.47%	Sue Myrick
9th	67.81%	30.47%	Robert Pittenger
10th	61.68%	36.3%	Patrick McHenry
11th	63.14%	34.18%	Heath Shuler
11th	63.14%	34.18%	Mark Meadows
12th	26.85%	71.37%	Mel Watt
13th	59.34%	38.49%	Brad Miller
13th	59.34%	38.49%	George Holding

== See also ==
- 2012 North Carolina lieutenant gubernatorial election
- 2012 United States gubernatorial elections
