= Joseph Thomas Knott =

American lawyer

Joseph Thomas Knott III

Member of the University of North Carolina Board of Governors
- In office 2015–2019

Personal details
- Born: July 25, 1951 (age 75) Raleigh, North Carolina, U.S.
- Party: Republican
- Spouse: Sarah Tucker
- Children: 6 (including Brad)
- Parent(s): J. T. Knott (father); Mary Faustine Pair (mother)
- Relatives: Joanna Saleeby Knott (daughter-in-law)
- Education: University of North Carolina at Chapel Hill (BS, JD); Trinity Evangelical Divinity School (MDiv)
- Occupation: lawyer

Joseph Thomas Knott III (born July 25, 1951) is an American lawyer and Baptist lay leader. He served as an Assistant United States Attorney and sat on the University of North Carolina Board of Governors. He ran as the Republican nominee in the 2004 North Carolina Attorney General election but lost to Democrat Roy Cooper. Knott is a member of the Southern Baptist Convention's Executive Committee.

== Early life, family, and education ==
Knott was born on July 25, 1951 in Raleigh, North Carolina. He is the son of Joseph Thomas Knott Jr., who served on the Wake County Board of Commissioners for twelve years. His grandfather, Joseph Thomas Knott Sr., served on the board of Wakelon High School in Zebulon, North Carolina.

He attended the University of North Carolina at Chapel Hill, graduating with a bachelor of science degree in 1974. He earned a master of divinity from Trinity Evangelical Divinity School in 1978 and a juris doctor from the University of North Carolina School of Law in 1980.

== Career ==
=== Law ===
Knott worked as a trial lawyer in the United States Department of Justice during the Reagan administration. He was an Assistant United States Attorney for four years and spent two years as a criminal prosecutor. He is now in private practice with the law firm Ward and Smith and was previously a partner at the law firm Knott, Clark, Berger & Whitehurst. He is a member of the North Carolina Bar Association and North Carolina Advocates for Justice.

A member of the Republican Party, Knott unsuccessfully ran for Attorney General of North Carolina in the 2004 election, losing to incumbent Democratic Attorney General Roy Cooper. He backed out of a planned debate with Cooper, claiming that the debate would have overshadowed the attorney general candidate's forum.

=== Education ===
Knott was selected by the North Carolina General Assembly to serve on the University of North Carolina Board of Governors, which governs all of the universities and colleges within the University of North Carolina system, in 2015. Later that year, Knott accused state lawmakers of interfering with the University of North Carolina's operations and voted against the legislature's request for the university system to turn over records of a closed meeting, that took place on October 30, 2015, where the board voted to raise the salaries of twelve university chancellors.

In February 2017, he introduced a ban on university centers filing legal actions and, in September 2017, he voted to block the UNC Center for Civil Rights from doing litigation.

In 2019, Knott called for the immediate restoration of "Silent Sam", a Confederate monument on the campus of the University of North Carolina at Chapel Hill that was toppled by protestors on August 20, 2018 and subsequently removed from the campus. In an op-ed that he wrote for The News & Observer, Knott referred to the protestors as "violent people" and a "mob."

Knott's term on the board of governors was completed in 2019.

He also served on the board of trustees of St. David's School, a private Episcopal school that his children attended.

=== Religion ===
Knott serves on the Executive Committee for the Southern Baptist Convention. In an online meeting for the executive committee in 2022, Knott claimed that the Convention taking preventative steps to end sexual abuse, in order to protect women and children, would ruin the Baptist church. He also stated that women and children "are going to be victimized no matter how much", and said that he feared the Southern Baptist Convention would end if targeted by class-action lawsuits.

== Personal life ==
Knott is married to Sarah Tucker and has six children. He is a brother-in-law of Garland Tucker III, CEO of the Triangle Capital Corporation, and Paul Martin Newby, Chief Justice of the North Carolina Supreme Court. One of his sons, Tucker Knott, worked as chief of staff to U.S. Congressman George Holding and Senator Ted Budd. He is also the father of U.S. Congressman Brad Knott and New York-based investor Thomas Knott.

He is a Southern Baptist, has ties to the Conservative Baptist Network, and teaches Sunday School at Christ Baptist Church in Raleigh.
