= 2004 North Carolina Attorney General election =

US State election

- November 2, 2004
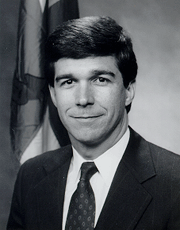

| Nominee | Roy Cooper | Joe Knott |
| Party | Democratic | Republican |
| Popular vote | 1,872,097 | 1,494,121 |
| Percentage | 55.61% | 44.39% |
- County results Cooper: 50–60% 60–70% 70–80% 80–90% Knott: 50–60% 60–70%
Attorney General before election
Roy Cooper
Democratic
Elected Attorney General
Roy Cooper
Democratic

The 2004 North Carolina Attorney General election was held on November 2, 2004, along with the gubernatorial election, as well as the Presidential election. Incumbent Democratic State Attorney General Roy Cooper won re-election, while incumbent Republican President George W. Bush won the state.

== Democratic primary ==
=== Candidates ===
==== Declared ====
- Roy Cooper, incumbent Attorney General

== Republican primary ==
=== Candidates ===
==== Declared ====
- Thom Goolsby
- Joe Knott
- Wendell H. Sawyer

=== Results ===
Republican primary results
| Party | Candidate | Votes | % |
|---|---|---|---|
| Republican | Joe Knott | 127,065 | 41.29% |
| Republican | Thom Goolsby | 116,874 | 37.98% |
| Republican | Wendell H. Sawyer | 63,803 | 20.73% |

== Results ==
General election results
| Party | Candidate | Votes | % |
|---|---|---|---|
| Democratic | Roy Cooper (incumbent) | 1,872,097 | 55.61 |
| Republican | Joe Knott | 1,494,121 | 44.39 |
| Total votes | | 3,366,218 | 100.00 |
| Democratic hold | | | |
