= 1988 North Carolina lieutenant gubernatorial election =

- November 8, 1988
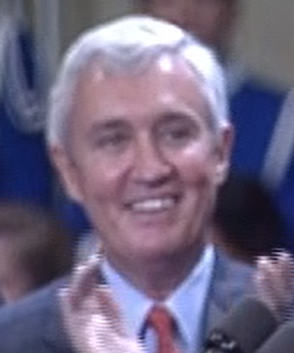

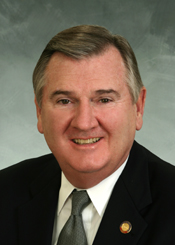
Nominee	Jim Gardner	Tony Rand
Party	Republican	Democratic
Popular vote	1,072,002	1,044,917
Percentage	50.64%	49.36%
- County results Gardner: 50–60% 60–70% 70–80% Rand: 50–60% 60–70% 70–80%
Lieutenant Governor before election
Robert B. Jordan
Democratic
Elected Lieutenant Governor
Jim Gardner
Republican

The 1988 North Carolina lieutenant gubernatorial election was held on November 8, 1988. Republican nominee Jim Gardner defeated Democratic nominee Tony Rand with 50.64% of the vote, becoming the first Republican elected lieutenant governor of North Carolina in the twentieth century.

== Primary elections ==
Primary elections were held on May 3, 1988.

=== Democratic primary ===
==== Candidates ====
- Tony Rand, State Senator
- Harold W. Hardison, State Senator
- H. Parks Helms, former State Representative
- Frank Jordan
- Robert L. Hannon

==== Results ====
Democratic primary results
Party	Candidate	Votes	%
Democratic	Tony Rand	219,511	42.75
Democratic	Harold W. Hardison	132,878	25.88
Democratic	H. Parks Helms	94,549	18.41
Democratic	Frank Jordan	48,222	9.39
Democratic	Robert L. Hannon	18,291	3.56
Total votes		513,451	100.00

=== Republican primary ===
==== Candidates ====
- Jim Gardner, U.S. Representative
- William T. "Bill" Boyd, State Representative
- Wendell H. Sawyer, former State Senator

==== Results ====
Republican primary results
Party	Candidate	Votes	%
Republican	Jim Gardner	107,171	79.46
Republican	William T. "Bill" Boyd	19,802	14.68
Republican	Wendell H. Sawyer	7,905	5.86
Total votes		134,878	100.00

== General election ==
=== Candidates ===
- Jim Gardner, Republican
- Tony Rand, Democratic

=== Results ===
1988 North Carolina lieutenant gubernatorial election
Party	Candidate	Votes	%	±%
Republican	Jim Gardner	1,072,002	50.64%	
Democratic	Tony Rand	1,044,917	49.36%	
Majority		27,085		
Turnout				
Democratic hold		Swing		
