= Michael V. Lee =

American politician (born 1968)

Michael Lee
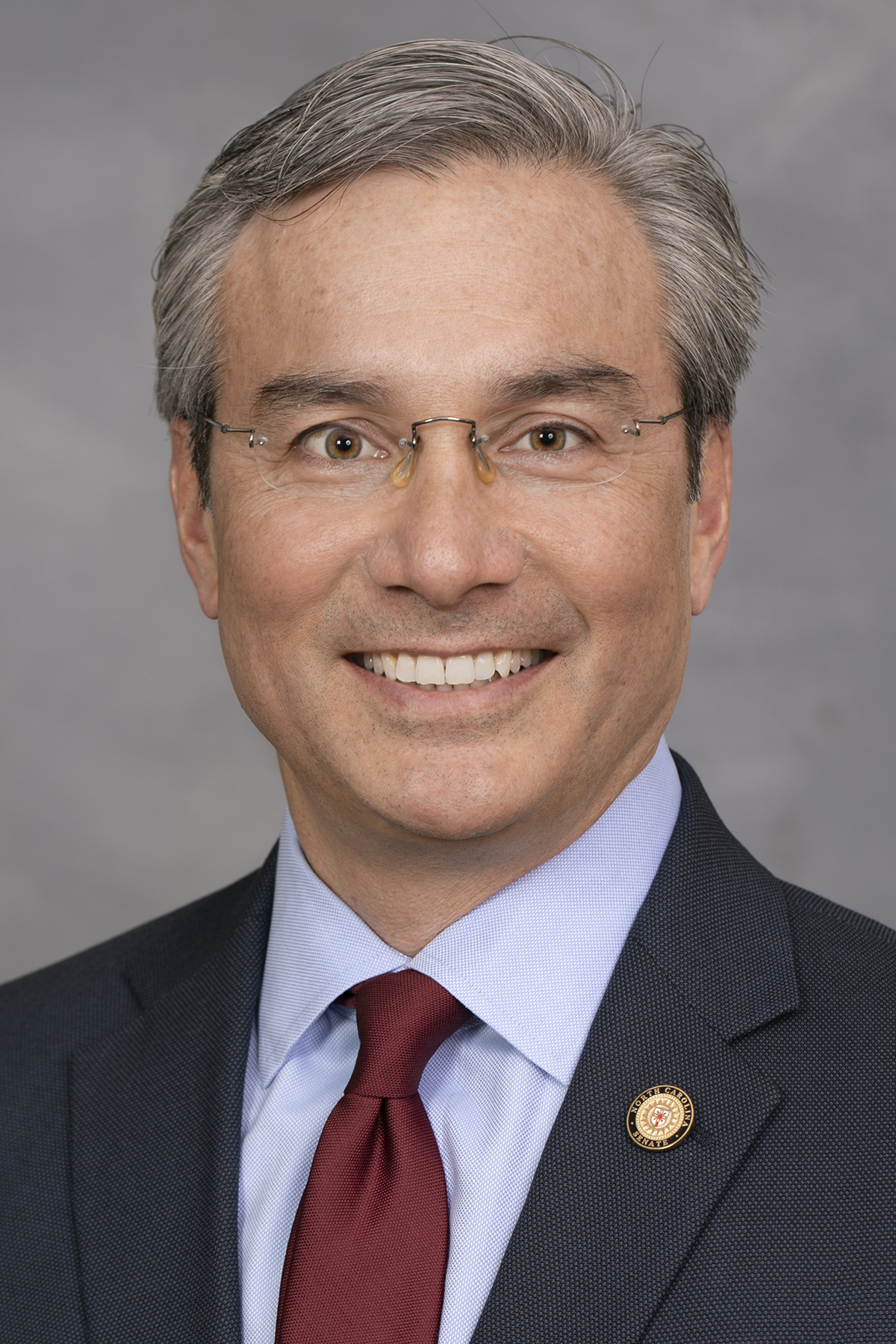

Majority Leader of the North Carolina Senate
- Incumbent
- Assumed office April 1, 2025
- Preceded by: Paul Newton

Member of the North Carolina Senate
- Incumbent
- Assumed office January 1, 2021
- Preceded by: Harper Peterson
- Constituency: 9th district (2021–2023); 7th district (2023–present)
- In office August 18, 2014 – January 1, 2019
- Preceded by: Thom Goolsby
- Succeeded by: Harper Peterson
- Constituency: 9th district

Personal details
- Born: Michael Vincent Lee; November 29, 1968 (age 57) Kingston, New York, U.S.
- Party: Republican
- Education: University of North Carolina, Wilmington (attended); University of North Carolina, Chapel Hill (BA); Wake Forest University (JD)

Michael Vincent Lee (born November 29, 1968) is a Republican member of the North Carolina State Senate.

Lee was first appointed to office in August 2014 replacing Thom Goolsby.

He was re-elected at the November 2016 election for a second term, having defeated Democrat Andrew Barnhill 57.35%-42.65%. He was defeated by Democrat Harper Peterson in the 2018 election and defeated Peterson in a rematch in the 2020 election. He was elected as majority leader in April 2025.

Lee holds a bachelor's degree from the University of North Carolina at Chapel Hill and a Juris Doctor degree from Wake Forest University.

As a lawyer, Lee started his own law firm in 2012.

== Electoral history ==
=== 2022 ===
North Carolina Senate 7th district general election, 2022
Party	Candidate	Votes	%
Republican	Michael Lee (incumbent)	44,908	50.97%
Democratic	Marcia Morgan	43,198	49.03%
Total votes		88,106	100%
Republican hold			

=== 2020 ===
North Carolina Senate 9th district general election, 2020
Party	Candidate	Votes	%
Republican	Michael Lee	63,255	50.51%
Democratic	Harper Peterson (incumbent)	61,987	49.49%
Total votes		125,242	100%
Republican gain from Democratic			

=== 2018 ===
North Carolina Senate 9th district general election, 2018
Party	Candidate	Votes	%
Democratic	Harper Peterson	42,257	48.60%
Republican	Michael Lee (incumbent)	42,026	48.33%
Libertarian	Ethan Bickley	2,671	3.07%
Total votes		86,954	100%
Democratic gain from Republican			

=== 2016 ===
North Carolina Senate 9th district general election, 2016
Party	Candidate	Votes	%
Republican	Michael Lee (incumbent)	60,174	57.35%
Democratic	Andrew Barnhill	44,743	42.65%
Total votes		104,917	100%
Republican hold			

=== 2014 ===
North Carolina Senate 9th district Republican primary election, 2014
Party	Candidate	Votes	%
Republican	Michael Lee	9,685	81.22%
Republican	Michael T. Burns	1,130	9.48%
Republican	Justin LaNasa	1,109	9.30%
Total votes		11,924	100%

North Carolina Senate 9th district general election, 2014
Party	Candidate	Votes	%
Republican	Michael Lee (incumbent)	35,517	55.36%
Democratic	Elizabeth Redenbaugh	28,637	44.64%
Total votes		64,154	100%
Republican hold			

=== 2010 ===
North Carolina Senate 9th district Republican primary election, 2010
Party	Candidate	Votes	%
Republican	Thom Goolsby	8,926	60.01%
Republican	Michael Lee	5,948	39.99%
Total votes		14,874	100%

=== 2008 ===
North Carolina Senate 9th district general election, 2008
Party	Candidate	Votes	%
Democratic	Julia Boseman (incumbent)	50,516	51.67%
Republican	Michael Lee	47,244	48.33%
Total votes		97,760	100%
Democratic hold			

North Carolina Senate
Preceded by Paul Newton	Majority Leader of the North Carolina Senate; 2025–present	Incumbent
