= Harper Peterson =

American politician

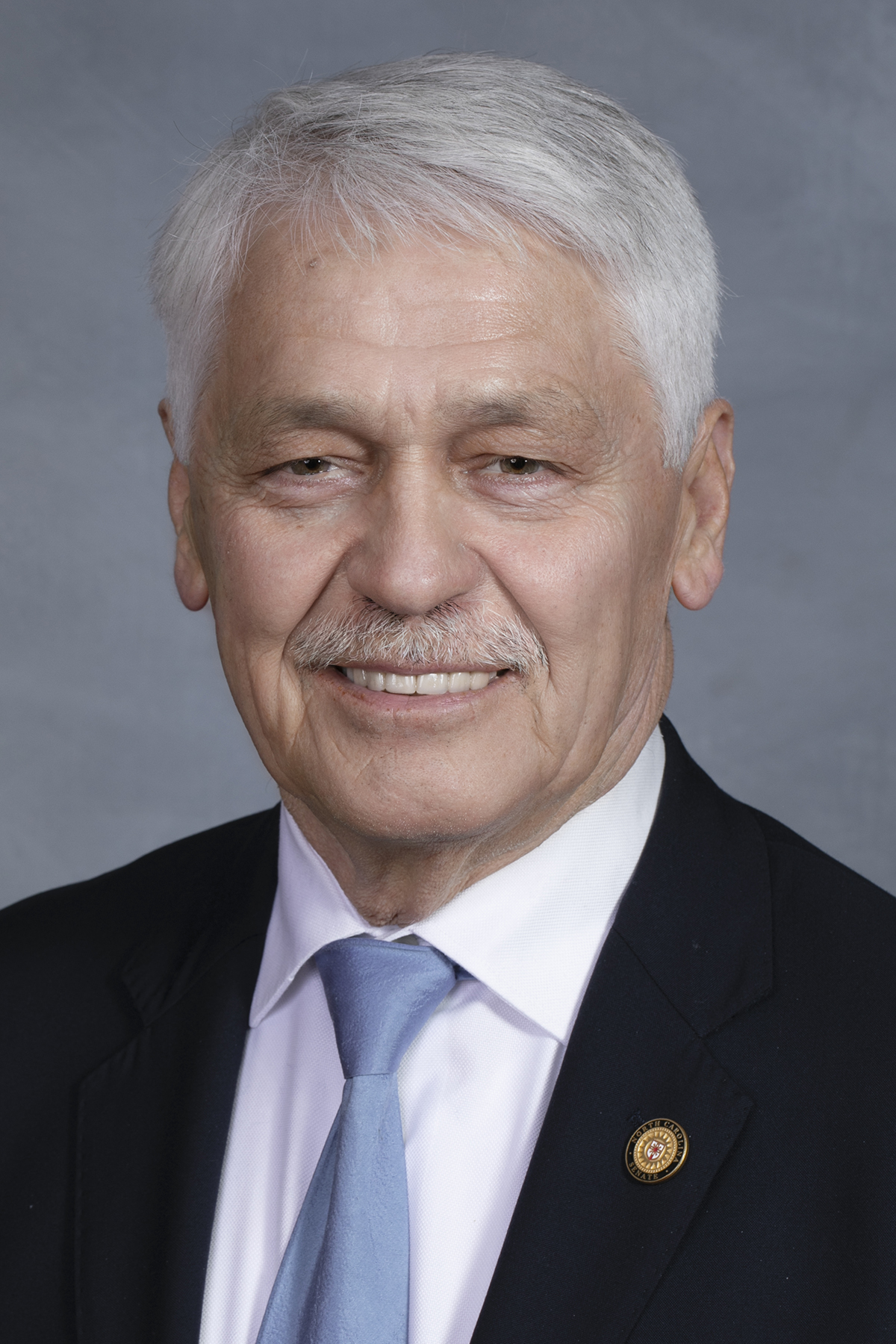

Member of the North Carolina Senate from the 9th district
- In office January 1, 2019 – January 1, 2021
- Preceded by: Michael Lee
- Succeeded by: Michael Lee

Mayor of Wilmington
- In office 2001–2003
- Preceded by: David L. Jones
- Succeeded by: Spence Broadhurst

Personal details
- Born: December 16, 1948 (age 77) Huntington, New York, U.S.
- Party: Democratic
- Spouse: Plunkett
- Children: five
- Education: University of North Carolina at Chapel Hill

Harper Peterson Jr. (born December 16, 1948) is a former Democratic member of the North Carolina State Senate, representing the 9th district. He was elected in the 2018 elections. Peterson formerly served as Mayor of Wilmington, North Carolina from 2001 to 2003, and on the Wilmington City Council from 1995 to 1999.

North Carolina Senate
Preceded by Michael Lee	Member of the North Carolina Senate from the 9th district 2019-2021	Succeeded by Michael Lee
