= Thom Goolsby =

American politician

Thomas Goolsby
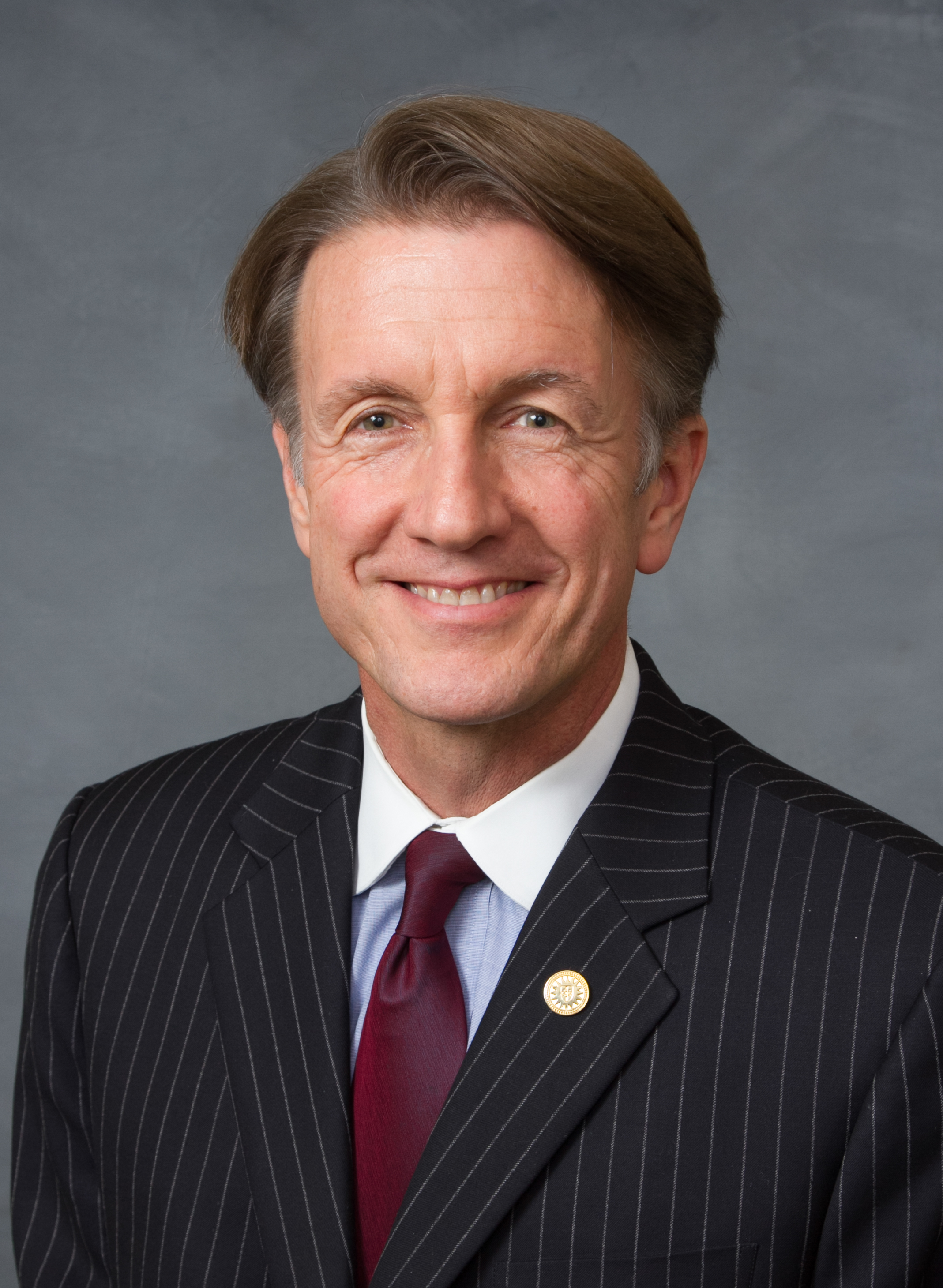

Member of the North Carolina Senate from the 9th district
- In office January 1, 2011 – August 4, 2014
- Preceded by: Julia Boseman
- Succeeded by: Michael Lee

Personal details
- Born: September 11, 1961 (age 65) Dothan, Alabama, U.S.
- Party: Republican
- Spouse: Rachael Goolsby
- Children: Fleming, Lilli, and Alabama
- Education: The Citadel (BBA); Golden Gate University (MBA); University of North Carolina at Chapel Hill (JD)
- Profession: Lawyer, adjunct professor of law, president of Empowered Investor
- Website: thomgoolsby.com

Thomas Cowart Goolsby (born September 11, 1961) is a former Republican North Carolina State Senator representing New Hanover County.

A graduate of The Citadel and regimental commander of the South Carolina Corps of Cadets, Goolsby served as a Marine Corps officer after college. Governor Jim Martin appointed him counsel to the State Crime Commission before he opened his legal practice, the Goolsby Law Firm, in Wilmington. He is a former chairman of the New Hanover County Republican Party and an adjunct professor of law at Campbell University.

Goolsby earned an M.B.A. from Golden Gate University and his J.D. from the University of North Carolina at Chapel Hill. He is the president of Empowered Investor Inc. However, the investment adviser registrations of Goolsby, his partner James Upham, and the firm were revoked for at least ten years in 2014. Empowered Investor, Upham and Goolsby also were ordered to cease and desist from engaging in any practice involving securities or financial services business in North Carolina. At that time Goolsby claimed that the business was closed. He lives in Wilmington with his wife Rachael and three children, Fleming, Lilli, and Alabama.

== Political career ==
=== 2004 North Carolina Attorney General Republican primary ===
Goolsby ran for the Republican nomination in the 2004 North Carolina Attorney General election, but lost the nomination to Joe Knott.

=== Election 2010 ===
Goolsby won the race for District 9 of the North Carolina State Senate in the November 2, 2010 general election. He defeated James Leutze (D) with 57% of the vote.

In polling prior to the election, Goolsby held a significant lead over Leutze. Both candidates campaigned on the need to cut state spending and control taxes.

=== Campaign contributions ===
In 2010, Goolsby raised $394,588 in campaign contributions.

=== Election 2012 ===
Goolsby was unopposed in the Republican primary on May 8, 2012. He faced Democratic nominee Deb Butler in the general election on November 6, 2012.

During the general election campaign, Goolsby was criticized for his support of mandatory, trans-vaginal ultrasounds for women seeking abortions. Though Goolsby went on to win re-election, Butler's campaign ad on this topic generated national and international attention.

=== As state senator ===
Goolsby sponsored legislation that repealed the state's Racial Justice Act, which had prohibited the imposition of the death penalty on the basis of race. As a member of the University of North Carolina Board of Governors, he favored the re-installation of the controversial statue "Silent Sam" following its toppling by protesters.

Goolsby has penned a number of opinion columns in local newspapers critical of the Moral Mondays protests, calling them "Moron Mondays" and later "Money Mondays", and referring to protestors as "mostly white, angry, aged former hippies."

Goolsby chose not to run for re-election in 2014, and he resigned from the legislature in August 2014, before the expiration of his term. His resignation followed the revocation by the secretary of state of his registration as an investment adviser, and his consent to the order. Clients had reportedly complained about losing money in volatile investments they never wanted.

==== Committees ====
Goolsby served as vice chairman of the Senate Judiciary I committee and chairman of both the Joint Legislative Oversight Committee on Justice and Public Safety and the Appropriations Committee on Justice and Public Safety. He chaired interim committees on pharmaceutical liability, retitling of manufactured homes and consolidation of judicial and prosecutorial districts. He was a member of interim committees on government operations, modernization of banking, energy policy and marine fisheries.

Political offices
Preceded by Julia Boseman (D)	Member of the North Carolina Senate from the 9th District; 2011-2014	Succeeded by Michael Lee (R)
