= 2012 North Carolina Attorney General election =

- November 6, 2012
- Turnout: 2,828,941 (42.6%)
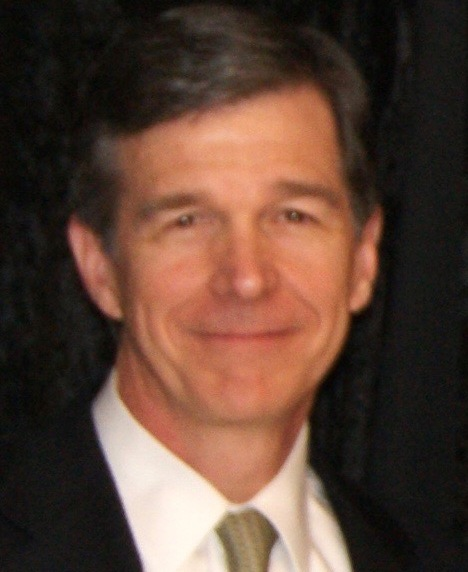
Nominee	Roy Cooper
Party	Democratic
Popular vote	2,828,941
Percentage	100.00%
- County results Cooper: 90–100%
Attorney General before election
Roy Cooper
Democratic
Elected Attorney General
Roy Cooper
Democratic

The 2012 North Carolina Attorney General election was held on November 6, 2012, concurrently with the other elections to the Council of State and the gubernatorial election. Incumbent Democratic State Attorney General Roy Cooper won re-election to a fourth term unopposed, as the Republicans did not field a candidate.

== Democratic primary ==
=== Candidates ===
==== Declared ====
- Roy Cooper, incumbent Attorney General

== General election ==
=== Results ===
General election results
Party	Candidate	Votes	%
Democratic	Roy Cooper (incumbent)	2,828,941	100.00%
Total votes		2,828,941	100.00%
Democratic hold			

On a total number of 6,639,131 eligible voters, 2,828,941 votes were cast (making a turnout of 42.6%) with Cooper winning 100% of votes cast.
