= Harold Hardison =

American politician

Harold Woodrow Hardison (1923–2015) was an American politician from North Carolina.

Hardison was a Freemason and Shriner who served in the United States Army Air Forces from 1942 to 1946 in the Pacific War. He founded the Humphrey-Hardison Oil Company and was a member of several municipal organizations in his hometown of Deep Run, North Carolina. He was elected to one-two year term as a Democratic member of the North Carolina House of Representatives in 1970, then won the first of eight consecutive terms in the North Carolina Senate during the 1972 election cycle. During his single term as a state representative, Hardison was engaged in discussions on redistricting. Hardison subsequently occupied the seat representing the fifth senatorial district from Lenoir County. Throughout his tenure on the state legislature, he became known for Hardison amendments, which forbade state agencies from enacting environmental regulations stricter than the federal standard. As a state senator, Hardison held chair positions on the Senate Appropriations Committee, the Senate Ways and Means Committee, and co-chaired the state's Select Committee on Education. In July 1981, Hardison co-sponsored a bill allowing the Office of State Budget and Management the power to oversee public school finances. In February 1983, Hardison stated that a drunk driving bill backed by Governor Jim Hunt would raise $2.5 million in revenue, and incur $1 million in costs. During the 1984 election cycle, Hardison ran unopposed. Hardison filed to contest the Democratic Party nomination for the 1988 North Carolina lieutenant gubernatorial election in January, and engaged in a debate on collection of monetary damages owed to accident victims in civil cases.

Hardison died at the age of 92 on 9 September 2015.
