= 2008 North Carolina Attorney General election =

- November 4, 2008
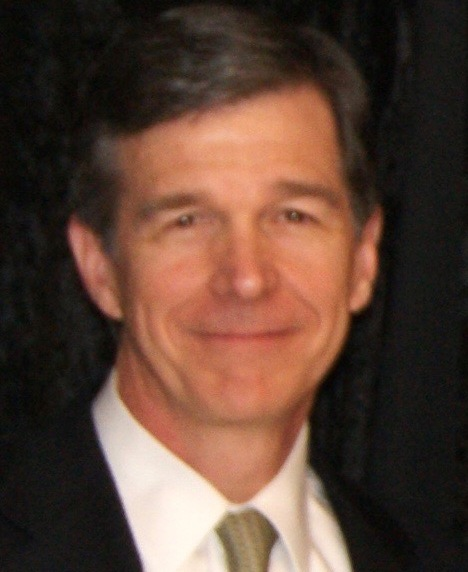

Nominee	Roy Cooper	Bob Crumley
Party	Democratic	Republican
Popular vote	2,538,178	1,615,762
Percentage	61.10%	38.90%
- Cooper: 50–60% 60–70% 70–80% 80–90% >90% Crumley: 50–60% 60–70% 70–80% 80–90% Tie: 50%
Attorney General before election
Roy Cooper
Democratic
Elected Attorney General
Roy Cooper
Democratic

The 2008 North Carolina Attorney General election was held on November 4, 2008, concurrently with the other elections to the Council of State and the gubernatorial election. Incumbent Democratic State Attorney General Roy Cooper won re-election to a third term in office and received the highest number of votes for any statewide Democrat in this year.

== Democratic primary ==
=== Candidates ===
==== Declared ====
- Roy Cooper, incumbent Attorney General

== Republican primary ==
=== Candidates ===
==== Declared ====
- Bob Crumley

== General election ==
=== Polling ===
Poll source	Date(s) administered	Roy Cooper (D)	Bob Crumley (R)
Public Policy Polling	October 18–18, 2008	59%	32%
Public Policy Polling	September 28–29, 2008	54%	32%
Public Policy Polling	August 20–23, 2008	48%	30%
Public Policy Polling	July 23–27, 2008	50%	35%
Public Policy Polling	May 8–9, 2008	47%	34%

=== Results ===
General election results
Party	Candidate	Votes	%
Democratic	Roy Cooper (incumbent)	2,538,178	61.10
Republican	Bob Crumley	1,615,762	38.90
Total votes		4,153,940	100.00
Democratic hold			
