= Rob Zapple =

American politician

Member of the New Hanover County Board of Commissioners
- Incumbent
- Assumed office December 22, 2014

Personal details
- Party: Democratic
- Spouse: Michele Zapple
- Children: 3
- Education: University of Virginia
- Occupation: General contractor, politician

Rob Zapple is an American politician and building contractor serving as a member of the New Hanover County Board of Commissioners in North Carolina. A member of the Democratic Party, he was first elected in 2014 and re-elected in 2018, 2022, and 2026.

== Early life and career ==
Zapple is a graduate of the University of Virginia. He is a general contractor and the owner of a Wilmington-based residential and commercial building firm that specializes in historic renovation and custom homes. He has lived with his wife Michele in New Hanover County for more than two decades and have three children. Zapple is a past president of the board of trustees of the Thalian Hall Center for the Performing Arts and sits on the board of Friends of Public Radio, the governing body of the public radio station WHQR.

== Tenure on the Board of Supervisors ==
Zapple was first elected to the Board of Supervisors for New Hanover County in 2014, after an initially unsuccessful campaign in 2012. In July 2026, readers of the Star-News voted Zapple the most influential elected official in the Wilmington area. In October 2024, Zapple was selected to the board of directors of the North Carolina Association of County Commissioners as district director for District 4, comprising New Hanover, Brunswick, Pender and Columbus counties. In May 2025, he was nominated by Governor Josh Stein to the North Carolina Residential Code Council and was subsequently confirmed by the North Carolina Senate.

=== Sale of New Hanover Regional Medical Center ===
On October 5, 2020, the Board of Commissioners voted 4–1 to sell the New Hanover Regional Medical Center to Novant Health, with $1.25 billion of the proceeds directed to a newly created private foundation, the New Hanover Community Endowment. Zapple cast the sole dissenting vote. Zapple said he was prepared to support the sale itself, which he called "a good deal", but objected to the foundation's bylaws and moved unsuccessfully to separate that question from the rest of the vote. He said the bylaws were "being rushed" and, as written, would "result in a massive transfer of wealth from the public to a privately controlled foundation."

=== Environment ===
Following the North Carolina Department of Environmental Quality's 2018 draft consent order with Chemours over GenX contamination of the Cape Fear River, Zapple said that the agreement was "a step in the right direction" but argued that it did not adequately address downstream impacts on New Hanover County's water supply.

== Electoral history ==
=== 2012 campaign ===
Zapple was one of four Democratic candidates in the May 2012 primary election for the New Hanover County Board of Commissioners. He was not successful in his campaign.

=== 2014 election ===
Zapple was elected to the board in November 2014 in a race decided by a narrow margin. Republican Derrick Hickey led until the final precinct reported, and a countywide recount confirmed Zapple's win with a margin of just 186 votes. An election protest alleging improper influence at one precinct, filed by a supporter of Hickey's, was dismissed by the county board of elections; the subsequent appeal delayed Zapple's seating until December 22, 2014.

=== 2018 election ===
Zapple and Julia Olson-Boseman advanced from a three-candidate Democratic primary in May 2018. In the November general election Zapple received the most votes. The result unseated Republican incumbent Skip Watkins and gave Democrats a 3–2 majority on the board for the first time since the 1980s.

=== 2022 election ===
In the May 2022 Democratic primary for two seats, Zapple led the field with 11,118 votes, ahead of Travis C. Robinson (8,048) and incumbent board chair Julia Olson-Boseman (5,579), whose defeat ended her bid for a third term. In the November general election, LeAnn Pierce (R) placed first with 47,462 votes and Zapple second with 45,144, securing him a third term.

=== 2026 election ===
Zapple led the March 3, 2026 Democratic primary with 11,027 votes (30.4 percent). He and LeShonda Wallace won the Democratic party's two nominations. They both went on to win seats in the general.
