= North Carolina's 9th Senate district =

American legislative district

North Carolina's 9th State Senate district
Senator
Brent Jackson; R–Autryville
- Demographics: 58% White; 22% Black; 15% Hispanic; 1% Asian; 1% Native American; 3% Multiracial
- Population (2023): 207,134

North Carolina's 9th Senate district is one of 50 districts in the North Carolina Senate. It has been represented by Republican Brent Jackson since 2023.

== Geography ==
Since 2023, the district has included all of Jones, Duplin, Pender, and Bladen counties, as well as most of Sampson County. The district overlaps with the 4th, 12th, 16th, and 22nd state house districts.

== District officeholders since 1973 ==
Senator	Party	Dates	Notes	Counties
William Jackson Blanchard (Salemburg)	Republican	January 1, 1973 – January 1, 1975		1973–1983; All of Johnston and Sampson counties.
Edward Renfrow (Smithfield)	Democratic	January 1, 1975 – January 1, 1981		1973–1983; All of Johnston and Sampson counties.
Robert Warren Sr. (Benson)	Democratic	January 1, 1981 – January 1, 1983	Redistricted to the 15th district.	1973–1983; All of Johnston and Sampson counties.
Vernon White (Winterville)	Democratic	January 1, 1983 – January 1, 1985	Redistricted from the 6th district.	1983–1993; Parts of Pitt, Beaufort, and Martin counties.
Thomas Fleming Taft (Greenville)	Democratic	January 1, 1985 – January 1, 1991		1983–1993; Parts of Pitt, Beaufort, and Martin counties.
Edward Warren (Greenville)	Democratic	January 1, 1991 – January 1, 2003	Redistricted to the 3rd district and retired.	1983–1993; Parts of Pitt, Beaufort, and Martin counties.
Edward Warren (Greenville)	Democratic	January 1, 1991 – January 1, 2003	Redistricted to the 3rd district and retired.	1993–2003; Parts of Lenoir, Pitt, Beaufort, and Martin counties.
Patrick Ballantine (Wilmington)	Republican	January 1, 2003 – April 20, 2004	Redistricted from the 4th district. Resigned to run for Governor.	2003–2013; All of New Hanover County.
Vacant		April 20, 2004 - May 5, 2004		2003–2013; All of New Hanover County.
Woody White (Wilmington)	Republican	May 5, 2004 – January 1, 2005	Appointed to finish Ballantine's term. Lost re-election.	2003–2013; All of New Hanover County.
Julia Boseman (Wilmington)	Democratic	January 1, 2005 – January 1, 2011	Retired to run for New Hanover County district court judge.	2003–2013; All of New Hanover County.
Thom Goolsby (Wilmington)	Republican	January 1, 2011 – August 4, 2014	Resigned.	2003–2013; All of New Hanover County.
Thom Goolsby (Wilmington)	Republican	January 1, 2011 – August 4, 2014	Resigned.	2013–2023; Most of New Hanover County.
Vacant		August 4, 2014 – August 18, 2014		2013–2023; Most of New Hanover County.
Michael Lee (Wilmington)	Republican	August 18, 2014 – January 1, 2019	Appointed to finish Goolsby's term. Lost re-election.	2013–2023; Most of New Hanover County.
Harper Peterson (Wilmington)	Democratic	January 1, 2019 – January 1, 2021	Lost re-election.	2013–2023; Most of New Hanover County.
Michael Lee (Wilmington)	Republican	January 1, 2021 – January 1, 2023	Redistricted to the 7th district.	2013–2023; Most of New Hanover County.
Brent Jackson (Autryville)	Republican	January 1, 2023 – Present	Redistricted from the 10th district.	2023–Present; All of Jones, Duplin, Pender, and Bladen counties. Most of Sampson County.

== Election results ==
=== 2024 ===
North Carolina Senate 9th district general election, 2024
Party	Candidate	Votes	%
Republican	Brent Jackson (incumbent)	68,632	65.03%
Democratic	Jamie Campbell Bowles	36,900	34.97%
Total votes		105,532	100%
Republican hold			

=== 2022 ===
North Carolina Senate 9th district general election, 2022
Party	Candidate	Votes	%
Republican	Brent Jackson (incumbent)	50,252	100%
Total votes		50,252	100%
Republican hold			

=== 2020 ===
North Carolina Senate 9th district general election, 2020
Party	Candidate	Votes	%
Republican	Michael Lee	63,255	50.51%
Democratic	Harper Peterson (incumbent)	61,987	49.49%
Total votes		125,242	100%
Republican gain from Democratic			

=== 2018 ===
North Carolina Senate 9th district general election, 2018
Party	Candidate	Votes	%
Democratic	Harper Peterson	42,257	48.60%
Republican	Michael Lee (incumbent)	42,026	48.33%
Libertarian	Ethan Bickley	2,671	3.07%
Total votes		86,954	100%
Democratic gain from Republican			

=== 2016 ===
North Carolina Senate 9th district general election, 2016
Party	Candidate	Votes	%
Republican	Michael Lee (incumbent)	60,174	57.35%
Democratic	Andrew Barnhill	44,743	42.65%
Total votes		104,917	100%
Republican hold			

=== 2014 ===
North Carolina Senate 9th district Republican primary election, 2014
Party	Candidate	Votes	%
Republican	Michael Lee	9,685	81.22%
Republican	Michael T. Burns	1,130	9.48%
Republican	Justin LaNasa	1,109	9.30%
Total votes		11,924	100%

North Carolina Senate 9th district general election, 2014
Party	Candidate	Votes	%
Republican	Michael Lee (incumbent)	35,517	55.36%
Democratic	Elizabeth Redenbaugh	28,637	44.64%
Total votes		64,154	100%
Republican hold			

=== 2012 ===
North Carolina Senate 9th district general election, 2012
Party	Candidate	Votes	%
Republican	Thom Goolsby (incumbent)	52,955	54.16%
Democratic	Deb Butler	44,817	45.84%
Total votes		97,772	100%
Republican hold			

=== 2010 ===
North Carolina Senate 9th district Republican primary election, 2010
Party	Candidate	Votes	%
Republican	Thom Goolsby	8,926	60.01%
Republican	Michael Lee	5,948	39.99%
Total votes		14,874	100%

North Carolina Senate 9th district general election, 2010
Party	Candidate	Votes	%
Republican	Thom Goolsby	36,701	57.44%
Democratic	Jim Leutze	27,189	42.56%
Total votes		63,890	100%
Republican gain from Democratic			

=== 2008 ===
North Carolina Senate 9th district general election, 2008
Party	Candidate	Votes	%
Democratic	Julia Boseman (incumbent)	50,516	51.67%
Republican	Michael Lee	47,244	48.33%
Total votes		97,760	100%
Democratic hold			

=== 2006 ===
North Carolina Senate 9th district general election, 2006
Party	Candidate	Votes	%
Democratic	Julia Boseman (incumbent)	27,804	62.99%
Republican	Al Roseman	16,333	37.01%
Total votes		44,137	100%
Democratic hold			

=== 2004 ===
North Carolina Senate 9th district Democratic primary election, 2004
Party	Candidate	Votes	%
Democratic	Julia Boseman	5,690	79.64%
Democratic	Buford "Buff" McConatha	1,455	20.36%
Total votes		7,145	100%

North Carolina Senate 9th district Republican primary election, 2004
Party	Candidate	Votes	%
Republican	Woody White (incumbent)	7,251	71.47%
Republican	Don Hayes	2,894	28.53%
Total votes		10,145	100%

North Carolina Senate 9th district general election, 2004
Party	Candidate	Votes	%
Democratic	Julia Boseman	40,486	50.55%
Republican	Woody White (incumbent)	39,601	49.45%
Total votes		80,087	100%
Democratic gain from Republican			

=== 2002 ===
North Carolina Senate 9th district Republican primary election, 2002
Party	Candidate	Votes	%
Republican	Patrick Ballantine (incumbent)	8,552	88.82%
Republican	Dallas J. Brown Jr.	1,076	11.18%
Total votes		9,628	100%

North Carolina Senate 9th district general election, 2002
Party	Candidate	Votes	%
Republican	Patrick Ballantine (incumbent)	34,361	65.11%
Democratic	Laura Padgett	17,381	32.93%
Libertarian	Shaun Mitchell	1,033	1.96%
Total votes		52,775	100%
Republican hold			

=== 2000 ===
North Carolina Senate 9th district general election, 2000
Party	Candidate	Votes	%
Democratic	Edward Warren (incumbent)	34,721	61.86%
Republican	A. A. "Dick" Adams	21,407	38.14%
Total votes		56,128	100%
Democratic hold			
