= Brad Knott =

American politician (born 1986)

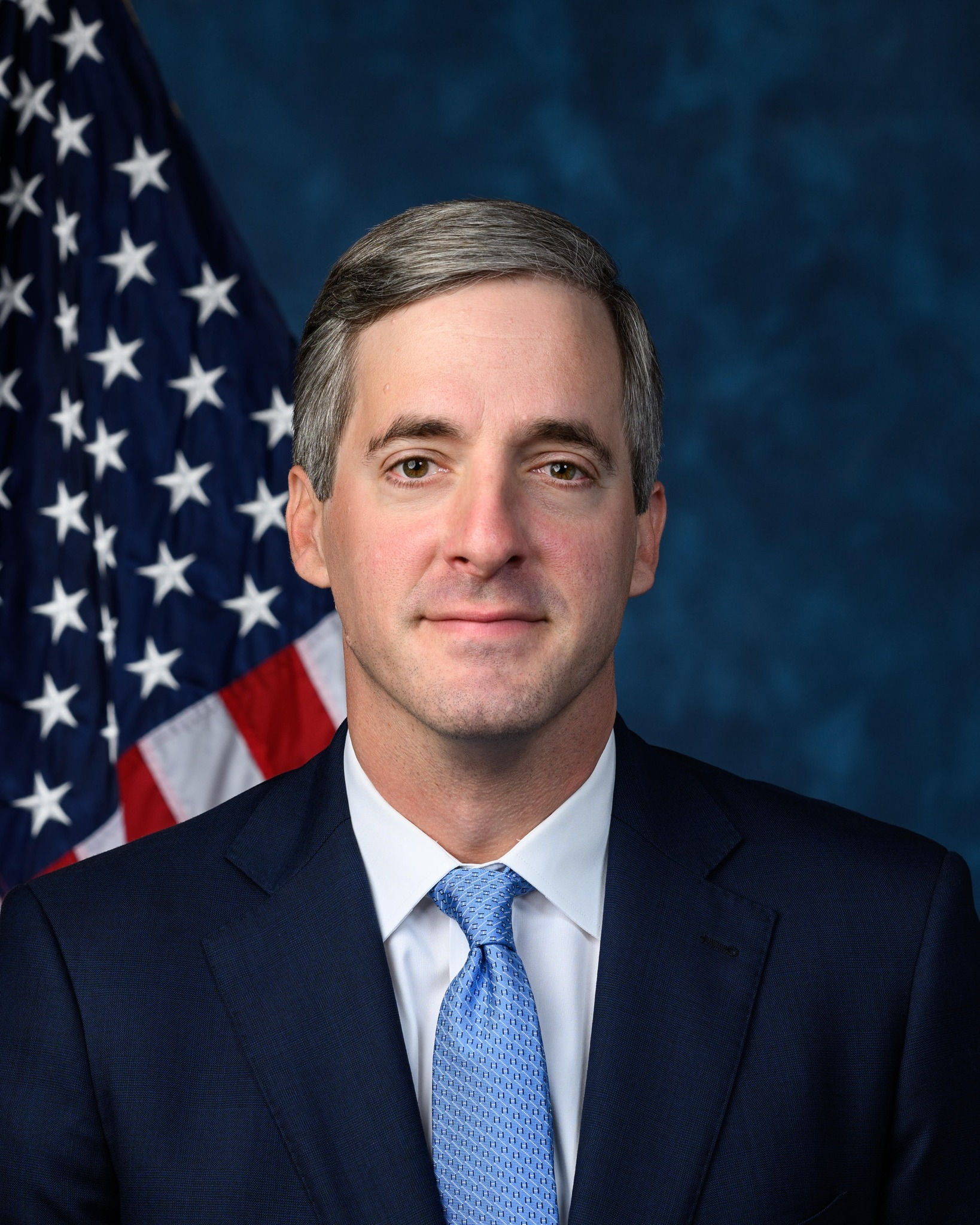
- Official portrait, 2025

Member of the U.S. House of Representatives from North Carolina's 13th district
- Incumbent
- Assumed office January 3, 2025
- Preceded by: Wiley Nickel

Personal details
- Born: John Bradford Knott; April 17, 1986 (age 40) Raleigh, North Carolina, U.S.
- Party: Republican
- Spouse: Joanna Saleeby
- Children: 2
- Parent(s): Joseph Thomas Knott (father); Sarah Tucker (mother)
- Relatives: J. T. Knott (grandfather)
- Education: Baylor University (BA); Wake Forest University (JD)
- Website: House website Campaign website

John Bradford Knott (born April 17, 1986) is an American attorney and politician. He is the member for the United States House of Representatives in North Carolina's 13th congressional district. Prior to taking office in 2025, he worked as a federal prosecutor in the office of the United States attorney for the Eastern District of North Carolina.

== Early life, family, and education ==
John Bradford Knott was born on April 17, 1986, in Raleigh, North Carolina. He is one of six siblings. His father, Joseph Thomas Knott III, was an assistant United States attorney and served on the University of North Carolina Board of Governors. Knott's grandfather, Joseph Thomas Knott Jr., served in the U.S. Army during World War II and was a member of the Wake County Board of Commissioners for twelve years. Knott's brother, Tucker Knott, is chief of staff for U.S. Senator Ted Budd and the former chief of staff for U.S. Congressman George Holding.

Knott attended St. David's School, a private Episcopal day school in Raleigh. Knott earned his bachelor's degree from Baylor University and his Juris Doctor degree from the Wake Forest University School of Law.

== Career ==
Knott was hired as a federal prosecutor in the office of the United States attorney for the Eastern District of North Carolina in 2016. He worked as a federal prosecutor until November 2023.

=== U.S. House of Representatives ===
==== Elections ====
===== 2024 =====
Knott ran for the United States House of Representatives seat for North Carolina's 13th congressional district in the 2024 elections. One of Knott's brothers, Thomas Knott, donated over $700,000 to the American Foundations Committee, a super PAC that supported his congressional campaign. He advanced to a runoff election against Kelly Daughtry, who finished in first place with 27% of the vote, while Knott obtained about 19%. After Donald Trump and Americans for Prosperity endorsed Knott, Daughtry dropped out of the race, leaving Knott to become the Republican nominee. He won the November election. He received criticism during the election for voting while registered at his father's Raleigh address despite living at his own residence in Raleigh. Knott referred to the incident as an "oversight".

===== 2026 =====
During the 2024 primary, North Carolina political news site The Assembly wrote that the redrawn 13th district was so heavily Republican on paper that whoever won the primary would likely have a long tenure in Congress. However, in 2026, Knott was defeated by attorney Paul Barringer in an upset. He was one of at least five Republican incumbents defeated despite a congressional map intended to give the GOP as many as 11 of North Carolina's 14 seats.

==== Tenure ====
Knott was sworn in to the 119th United States Congress on January 3, 2025.

==== Committee assignments ====
For the 119th Congress:

- Committee on Homeland Security
  - Subcommittee on Border Security and Enforcement
- Committee on the Judiciary
  - Subcommittee on Crime and Federal Government Surveillance
  - Subcommittee on Immigration Integrity, Security, and Enforcement
- Committee on Transportation and Infrastructure
  - Subcommittee on Aviation
  - Subcommittee on Highways and Transit
  - Subcommittee on Water Resources and Environment

== Political positions ==
=== Counterfeit Chinese vapes ===
In April 2026, Knott warned about the Vapor Technology Association, saying the association has networks tied to China and whose member companies are introducing counterfeit vaping products into the U.S. market. The Vapor Technology Association (VTA) is the primary American trade association that represents e-cigarette manufacturers and vendors. The VTA and its leaders have financial ties to the manufacturers of illegally imported Chinese vapes. "The Chinese Communist Party has carried out an elaborate effort to skirt trade barriers and flood the U.S. market with dangerous counterfeit vape products," Knott said. “This is not a secret. It is known."

Knott has said he has refused to meet with any groups connected to the VTA and has urged other members of Congress to do the same. Chinese vape manufacturers are increasingly using synthetic nicotine analogs, such as 6-methyl nicotine, to bypass FDA regulations and pre-market review requirements for nicotine products. 6-methyl nicotine is marketed under names like Nixodine and Metatine.

=== Firearms ===
Knott supports gun rights and supports the Second Amendment.

=== Foreign affairs ===
Knott supports Israel in the Gaza war. He opposes providing aid to Ukraine in the Russo-Ukrainian War.

=== Government spending ===
Knott stated that the federal government employs too many people and that some employees, who he claims do not serve taxpayers well, add unnecessary costs to both the public and private sector.

=== Immigration ===
Knott opposes sanctuary policies enacted by local governments to protect undocumented immigrants. He called for more criminal deportations, stating in 2024 that immigrants who commit crimes ranging from a "DUI all the way up to serious drug trafficking or violent felonies" need to be expelled from the country. Knott wants more local police officers to be cross-deputized with federal credentials in order to assist in increasing criminal deportations. He also opposes the concept of open borders and calls for a more secure Mexico–United States border.

In 2025, he introduced the Tren de Aragua Border Security Threat Assessment Act, which would require the United States Department of Homeland Security to conduct threat assessments on the Tren de Aragua transnational organized crime syndicate in Venezuela.

=== LGBTQ rights ===
Knott opposes transgender women competing in women's sports.

=== Views on Abortion ===
Knott, who identifies as pro-life, opposes the legalization of abortion and voiced support for the U.S. Supreme Court's overturning of Roe v. Wade in Dobbs v. Jackson Women's Health Organization. He claimed that religiously-operated crisis pregnancy centers were under attack from "pro-abortion extremists and left-wing politicians."

== Personal life ==
Knott is married to Joanne Saleeby, a former golfer at North Carolina State University and the owner of Monkee's of Raleigh boutique in North Hills. They have two daughters.

He is Southern Baptist.

== Electoral history ==
2024 North Carolina's 13th congressional district Republican primary results
Party	Candidate	Votes	%
Republican	Kelly Daughtry	22,978	27.4
Republican	Brad Knott	15,664	18.7
Republican	Fred Von Canon	14,344	17.1
Republican	DeVan Barbour	12,892	15.4
Republican	Josh McConkey	5,926	7.1
Republican	Kenny Xu	3,604	4.3
Republican	David Dixon	2,146	2.6
Republican	Matt Shoemaker	2,003	2.4
Republican	Chris Baker	1,089	1.3
Republican	Eric Stevenson	844	1.0
Republican	Marcus Dellinger	798	1.0
Republican	Siddhanth Sharma	614	0.7
Republican	James Phillips	565	0.7
Republican	Steve Von Loor	427	0.5
Total votes		83,894	100.0

2024 North Carolina's 13th congressional district Republican primary runoff results
Party	Candidate	Votes	%
Republican	Brad Knott	19,632	90.8
Republican	Kelly Daughtry (withdrawn)	1,998	9.2
Total votes		21,630	100.0

2024 North Carolina's 13th congressional district election
Party	Candidate	Votes	%
Republican	Brad Knott	243,655	58.6
Democratic	Frank Pierce	171,835	41.4
Total votes		415,490	100.0
Republican gain from Democratic			

2026 North Carolina's 13th congressional district Republican primary results
Party	Candidate	Votes	%
Republican	Brad Knott (incumbent)	44,038	89.9
Republican	Sid Sharma	4,935	10.1
Total votes		48,858	100.0

2026 North Carolina's 13th congressional district election
Party	Candidate	Votes	%
Republican	Brad Knott (incumbent)		
Democratic	Paul Barringer		
Libertarian	Steven Swinton		
Total votes			

U.S. House of Representatives
Preceded by Wiley Nickel	Member of the U.S. House of Representatives from North Carolina's 13th congressional district 2025–present	Incumbent
U.S. order of precedence (ceremonial)
Preceded by Mike Kennedy	United States representatives by seniority 394th	Succeeded by George Latimer
