= 2000 North Carolina Attorney General election =

North Carolina election

- November 7, 2000
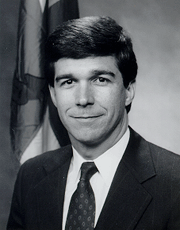

Nominee	Roy Cooper	Dan Boyce
Party	Democratic	Republican
Popular vote	1,446,793	1,310,845
Percentage	51.21%	46.40%
- County results Cooper: 40–50% 50–60% 60–70% 70–80% Boyce: 40–50% 50–60% 60–70% 70–80%
Attorney General before election
Mike Easley
Democratic
Elected Attorney General
Roy Cooper
Democratic

The 2000 North Carolina Attorney General election was held on November 7, 2000, concurrently with the 2000 North Carolina gubernatorial election and the 2000 United States presidential election, to elect the attorney general of North Carolina. The North Carolina Senate Majority leader Democrat Roy Cooper won the election, and assumed office on January 6, 2001.

== Democratic Party ==
=== Candidates ===
==== Declared ====
- Roy Cooper

== Republican Party ==
=== Candidates ===
==== Declared ====
- Dan Boyce

== Reform Party ==
=== Candidates ===
==== Declared ====
- Margaret Palms

== Results ==
General election results
Party	Candidate	Votes	%
Democratic	Roy Cooper	1,446,793	51.21
Republican	Dan Boyce	1,310,845	46.40
Reform	Margaret Palms	67,536	2.39
Total votes		2,825,174	100.00
Democratic hold			

== Controversy ==
During the campaign, the Cooper campaign ran ads which Boyce claims contained false statements about his law practice. In 2014, both parties signed to end civil actions following a written apology to Boyce by Cooper. However, Boyce still believed that the State Bar needed to take its own separate action on the case.
