= Rachel Gray =

American politician (1930–2010)

Rachel Gillean Gray (September 26, 1930 – January 19, 2010) was an American politician.

== Life and career ==
Gray was affiliated with the Democratic Party from her time as a member of the city council of High Point, North Carolina. As a city councilor, she served as liaison to the High Point Human Relations Commission, and as mayor pro-term. Gray began serving as a state legislator in 1977. In her tenure in the North Carolina Senate, during which she represented Guilford County, Gray supported the Equal Rights Amendment. However, Gray protested the lack of legislative process afforded to discussions on its ratification. She lost reelection to Wendell Sawyer during the 1984 state legislative elections. The next year, Gray considered running for the United States Senate, telling The Dispatch, a newspaper that previously reported speculation that she would not run served as "ice thrown on my candidacy." Gray died on January 19, 2010, at the age of 79.
