= J. T. Knott =

American politician and soldier

Wake County Commissioner
- In office 1970–1982

Personal details
- Born: April 16, 1926 (age 100) Wake County, North Carolina, U.S.
- Party: Democratic
- Spouse: Mary Faustine Pair
- Children: 3 (including Joseph Thomas Knott)
- Relatives: Brad Knott (grandson)
- Education: Wakelon High School
- Occupation: politician, businessman, soldier, farmer

Military service
- Allegiance: United States
- Branch/service: United States Army
- Years of service: 1944–1945
- Rank: Corporal
- Commands: 94th Infantry Division
- Battles/wars: World War II
- Awards: Purple Heart

Joseph Thomas "J.T." Knott Jr. (born April 16, 1926) is an American politician, farmer, businessman, and retired non-commissioned military officer. He served in the 94th Infantry Division of the United States Army during World War II and was awarded the Purple Heart. A Democrat, Knott served as a member of the Wake County Board of Commissioners from 1970 to 1982.

== Early life and family ==
Knott was born on April 16, 1926 outside of Zebulon in Wake County, North Carolina. His parents, Joseph Thomas Knott Sr. and Ethel Lenora Robertson Knott, owned a 100-acre farm where they grew tobacco, corn, and wheat. His father served as a member of the Wakelon High School Board. When Knott was a teenager, his family left Zebulon and moved to Knightdale, where they purchased a 400-acre farm along U.S. Highway 64 that was originally owned by his maternal grandparents, George Everette Robertson and Lenora Catherine Weathers Robertson. The family attended Knightdale Baptist Church.

== Career ==
After graduating from Wakelon High School in May 1944, Knott registered for the United States Army on April 18, 1944. He served as a corporal in the 94th Infantry Division during World War II. He operated a machine gun and was assigned to the front lines as a replacement soldier. He was wounded in March 1945 while fighting near the Rhine River and was awarded the Purple Heart. After the war, Knott returned to Knightdale to operate his family's farm and general store. He also owns the Wendell-Knightdale Airport.

A member of the Democratic Party, Knott served as a Wake County Commissioner for 12 years. He was the only commissioner to openly oppose the passage of a school bond proposal. In 1984, he volunteered on the senatorial campaign for the Republican candidate Jesse Helms over his party mate Jim Hunt. Knott also served on the advisory council for Knightdale Elementary School and Vaiden Whitley High School.

== Personal life ==
Knott was married to Mary Faustine Pair, who died in 2013. They had three children: Joseph Thomas Knott III, Carolynn Faustine Knott, and Frances Knott. He is the grandfather of U.S. Congressman Brad Knott.

In September 2019, Knott presented a program titled Remembrances of WWII: A Veteran’s Perspective at the Wake Forest Historical Museum for the General James Moore Chapter of the Daughters of the American Revolution as part of the chapter's celebrations for Constitution Week.
