= Roy Cooper =

Governor of North Carolina from 2017 to 2025

- Cooper in 2026

United States Senator-elect from North Carolina
- Assuming office January 3, 2027
- Succeeding: Thom Tillis

75th Governor of North Carolina
- In office January 1, 2017 – January 1, 2025
- Lieutenant: Dan Forest; Mark Robinson
- Preceded by: Pat McCrory
- Succeeded by: Josh Stein

50th Attorney General of North Carolina
- In office January 6, 2001 – January 1, 2017
- Governor: Mike Easley; Bev Perdue; Pat McCrory
- Preceded by: Mike Easley
- Succeeded by: Josh Stein

Majority Leader of the North Carolina Senate
- In office July 17, 1997 – January 1, 2001
- Preceded by: Richard Conder
- Succeeded by: Tony Rand

Member of the North Carolina Senate from the 10th district
- In office February 21, 1991 – January 1, 2001
- Preceded by: Jim Ezzell
- Succeeded by: A. B. Swindell

Member of the North Carolina House of Representatives from the 72nd district
- In office February 9, 1987 – February 21, 1991
- Preceded by: Allen Barbee
- Succeeded by: Edward McGee

Personal details
- Born: Roy Asberry Cooper III; June 13, 1957 (age 69) Nashville, North Carolina, U.S.
- Party: Democratic
- Spouse: Kristin Bernhardt (m. 1992)
- Children: 3
- Relatives: Pell Cooper (brother)
- Education: University of North Carolina, Chapel Hill (BA, JD)
- Website: Campaign website
- Cooper's voice Cooper on the North Carolina response to Hurricane Helene; Recorded October 2, 2024

Roy Asberry Cooper III (Note: Pronunciation: /ˈkʊpər/, KUUP-ər. See § Pronunciation of surname.) (born June 13, 1957) is an American politician and lawyer who is a United States senator-elect from North Carolina. A member of the Democratic Party, he previously served as the 75th governor of North Carolina (2017–2025), as the 50th attorney general of North Carolina (2001–2017), and in the North Carolina General Assembly (1987–2001).

Born and raised in Eastern North Carolina, Cooper graduated from UNC Chapel Hill in 1979. He began his career as a lawyer and in 1986 was elected to represent the 72nd district in the North Carolina House of Representatives. In 1991, he was appointed a member of the North Carolina Senate, a position he held until 2001. He was elected North Carolina Attorney General in 2000 and reelected in 2004, 2008, and 2012. His almost 16 year tenure as attorney general is the longest in the state's history.

Cooper was first elected governor in 2016, narrowly defeating Republican incumbent Pat McCrory; he is the first challenger to defeat a sitting governor in the state's history. He was reelected in 2020. Although the Republican-dominated legislature passed bills in a special session to reduce the power of the governorship before he took office, Cooper was able to successfully negotiate statewide Medicaid expansion.

Cooper ran for the U.S. Senate in the 2026 election in North Carolina, and he defeated Republican Michael Whatley in the general election.

== Early life and education ==
Roy Asberry Cooper III was born in Nashville, North Carolina, on June 13, 1957, to Beverly Thorne (née Batchelor) (1929–2013), a teacher, and Roy Asberry Cooper II (1927–2015), a lawyer and Democratic Party operative who was a close advisor to Jim Hunt; he later co-chaired Hunt's successful 1976 gubernatorial campaign. He is a descendant of Marcom Cooper, who served as a grand juror and as a petit juror during the American Revolutionary War.

Cooper is the brother of district court judge Pell Cooper. He attended public schools and worked on his parents' tobacco farm during summers. He attended Northern Nash High School, where he was an athlete, a participant in Boys State, and a member of student government. During his senior year, he was selected to represent Nash County in the Youth Legislative Assembly. He graduated in 1975.

Cooper received the Morehead Scholarship at the University of North Carolina at Chapel Hill for his undergraduate studies. As an undergraduate at UNC, he was a member of the Chi Psi fraternity and was elected president of the university's Young Democrats. He graduated with a Bachelor of Arts in political science in 1979. He earned a Juris Doctor degree from the University of North Carolina School of Law in 1982.

== Early career ==
While Cooper was still in law school, then-Governor Jim Hunt appointed him to the State Goals and Policy Board, an advisory group that sought to achieve long- and short-range goals and policies for the state. He was the youngest person ever to serve on the board. Hunt also appointed Cooper to the Interim Balance Growth Board and the North Carolina 2000 Commission. He was also a member of the Rocky Mount Chamber of Commerce and UNC-Chapel Hill's Board of Visitors.

In 1982, Cooper joined the law firm Fields, Cooper & Henderson in Nashville, North Carolina, the same firm his father had been a founding member of. Three years later, he was named a partner in the firm. In 1984, Cooper served as the Rocky Mount and Nash County chairman of Lauch Faircloth's unsuccessful gubernatorial campaign.

== North Carolina legislature (1987–2001) ==
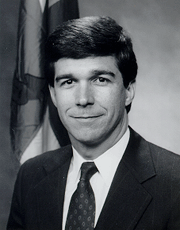
Cooper as a state senator

On November 19, 1985, Cooper filed to run for the North Carolina House of Representatives in the 72nd district. He challenged 12-term incumbent Allen Barbee in the Democratic primary and ran on a campaign of supporting agriculture and resolving a school merger dispute in Nash County. Cooper won the primary with 76% of the vote to Barbee's 24%, including more than a six times gap in votes for Nash county (5,966 vs 884), and he was unopposed in the general election.

Cooper continued to practice law while serving in the legislature. The nonpartisan North Carolina Center for Public Policy Research ranked him the most effective freshman representative. In January 1989, he joined Republicans and 20 other dissident Democrats to unseat Speaker Liston B. Ramsey in favor of Josephus Mavretic, who appointed Cooper chair of the House Judiciary Committee, of which he had been a member during his first term. Cooper also voted with all House Republicans and 15 Democrats in favor of an unsuccessful attempt to amend the constitution to grant the governor veto power over legislation.

In February 1991, after State Senator Jim Ezzell was killed in a car crash, Cooper was appointed to the Senate to serve the remainder of Ezzell's term representing the 10th district, which encompassed parts of Edgecombe, Halifax, Nash, and Wilson Counties. In 1995, Cooper negotiated a compromise bill to schedule a referendum to amend the constitution and grant the governor veto power. In July 1997, he was elected Majority leader of the Senate upon Richard Conder's abrupt resignation. During his last term in the Senate, he was elected to the North Carolina Bar Association's Board of Governors, a position he held until June 2002.

Cooper's record in the legislature included implementing penalties for minors who bring guns to school, making public records more accessible, toughening the state's open meetings law, and giving the governor more veto power.

== North Carolina Attorney General (2001–2017) ==
=== Elections ===
In January 2000, Cooper filed with the state Board of Elections to launch a campaign for North Carolina attorney general. In the November general election, he defeated Republican lawyer Dan Boyce and Reform Party candidate Margaret Palms. He took office on January 6, 2001, and was reelected in 2004, defeating Republican Joseph Thomas Knott. He was easily reelected in 2008, defeating Republican Bob Crumley and garnering more votes than any other statewide candidate that year. Cooper ran unopposed for a fourth term in 2012, and received 2,828,941 votes.

Both state and national Democrats attempted to recruit Cooper to run for governor in 2008, the U.S. Senate in 2010, and again for governor in 2012, but he declined each time. A 2009 Public Policy Polling survey matching him against incumbent U.S. Senator Richard Burr showed Cooper leading Burr by four points.

=== Tenure ===
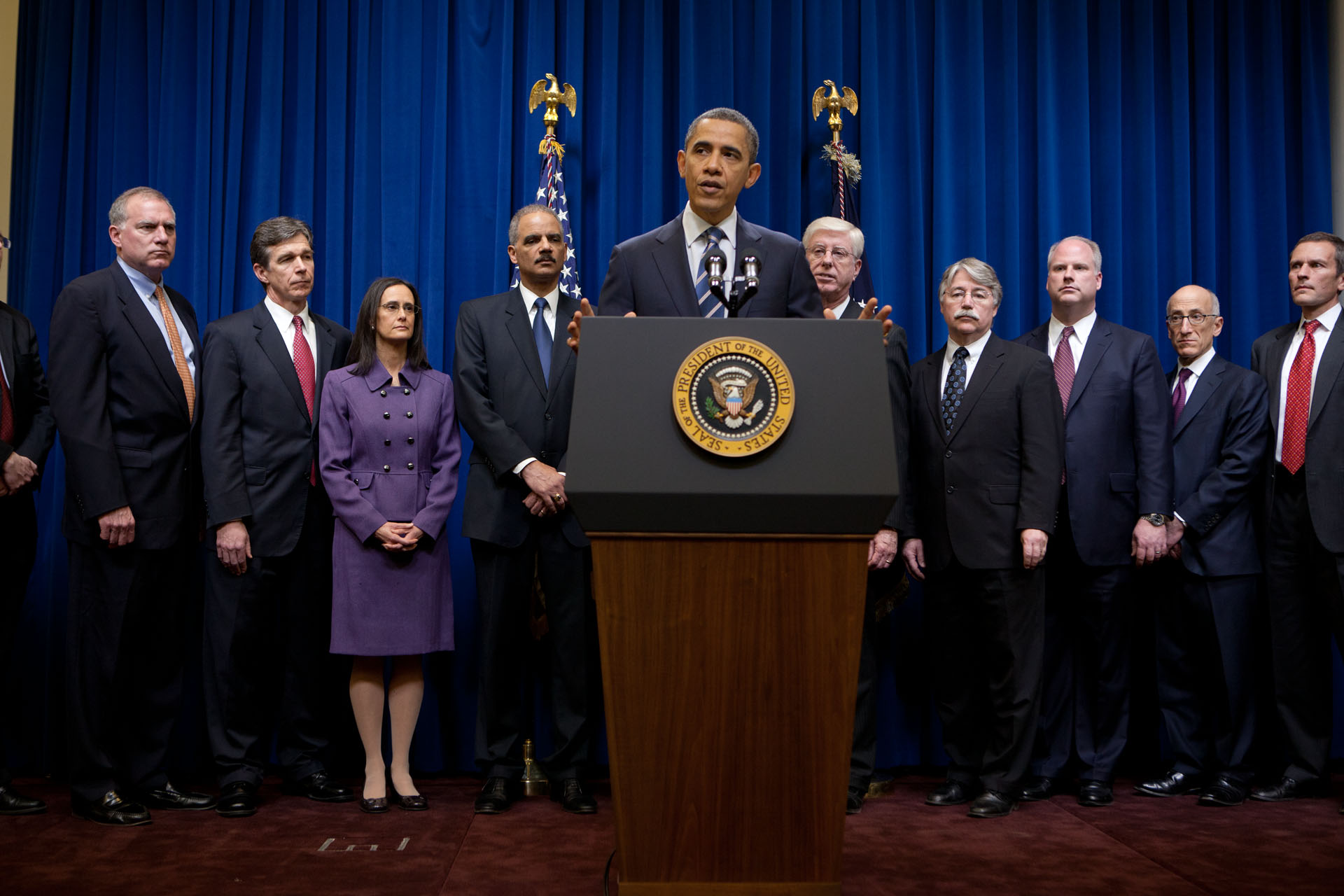
Attorney General Roy Cooper (second from the left) standing behind President Barack Obama as he delivers a speech, February 2012

In 2001, Cooper initiated legislation that established new mentoring and tutoring programs for middle and high school students out on short-term suspension. Governor Mike Easley signed the bill in June of that year.

In 2002, a controversy arose after the North Carolina Division of Motor Vehicles was accused of covering up the speeding citation issued for Democratic U.S. House candidate James Ferguson during the 2000 campaign, and the North Carolina Republican Party called on Cooper to launch an investigation. Faced with potential fallout for investigating members of his own party, Cooper called on federal prosecutors to convene an investigative grand jury, arguing that they had powers to compel testimony not available to the state.

In January 2007, when Durham District Attorney Mike Nifong asked to be recused from dealing with the Duke lacrosse case, Cooper's office assumed responsibility for the case. On April 11, 2007, after revelations of Nifong's withholding of evidence, fabrications, and other ethics violations, Cooper dismissed the case against the Duke lacrosse team players, taking the extraordinary step of declaring them "innocent" and victims of a "tragic rush to accuse". The decision won him bipartisan praise.

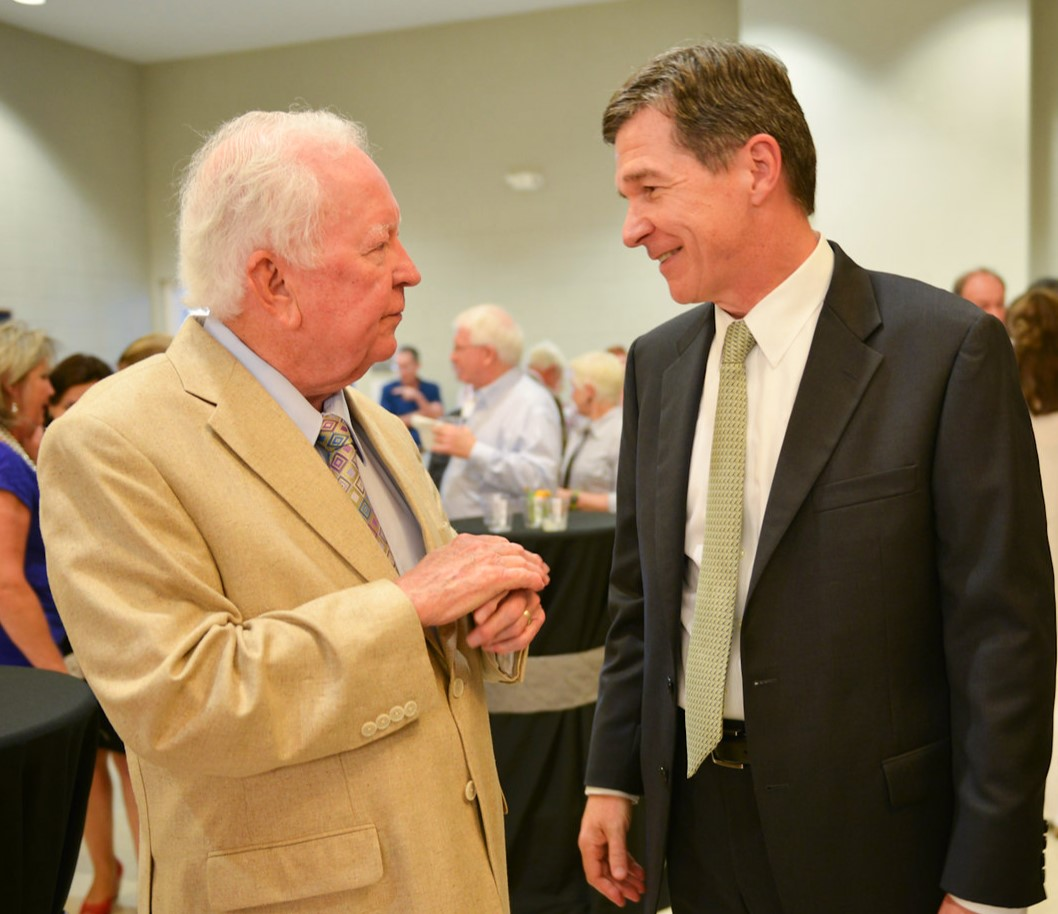
Cooper and former U.S. Representative Tim Valentine in August 2014

Days after the 2007 Virginia Tech shooting, Cooper created the Campus Safety Task Force to analyze school shootings and make policy recommendations to help the government prevent and respond to them. The task force delivered its report in January 2008. After the release of its findings, Cooper assisted members of the North Carolina General Assembly in passing a law that required court clerks to record involuntary commitments in a national gun permit database.

After a 2010 decision by a three-judge panel to exonerate Gregory Taylor, who had served nearly 17 years for the first-degree murder of Jaquetta Thomas, Cooper ordered an audit after it was learned that officials at the North Carolina State Bureau of Investigation forensic lab had withheld information. This suppression of evidence had contributed to Taylor's conviction for murder. The audit was released in 2010; it found that it had been common practice for two decades for a select group of agents at the State Bureau of Investigation to withhold information. In addition, they did not keep up with scientific standards and the latest tests. The two investigators, Chris Swecker and Micheal Fox, cited almost 230 cases tainted by these actions. Three people convicted in such cases had been executed; 80 convicts were still in prison. A massive state effort was undertaken to follow up on their cases.

In 2011 Cooper argued his first case before the United States Supreme Court, J. D. B. v. North Carolina, a case related to Miranda rights in juvenile cases. The Court ruled 5–4 against North Carolina.

In 2014, after a major coal ash spill in the Dan River, then-Governor Pat McCrory accused Cooper of politicizing the incident after Cooper criticized Duke Energy, the company responsible for the spill. McCrory later accused Cooper of "fighting against" efforts to clean up the spill, a claim WRAL-TV called "nonexistent".

== Governor of North Carolina (2017–2025) ==
=== Elections ===
==== 2016 ====
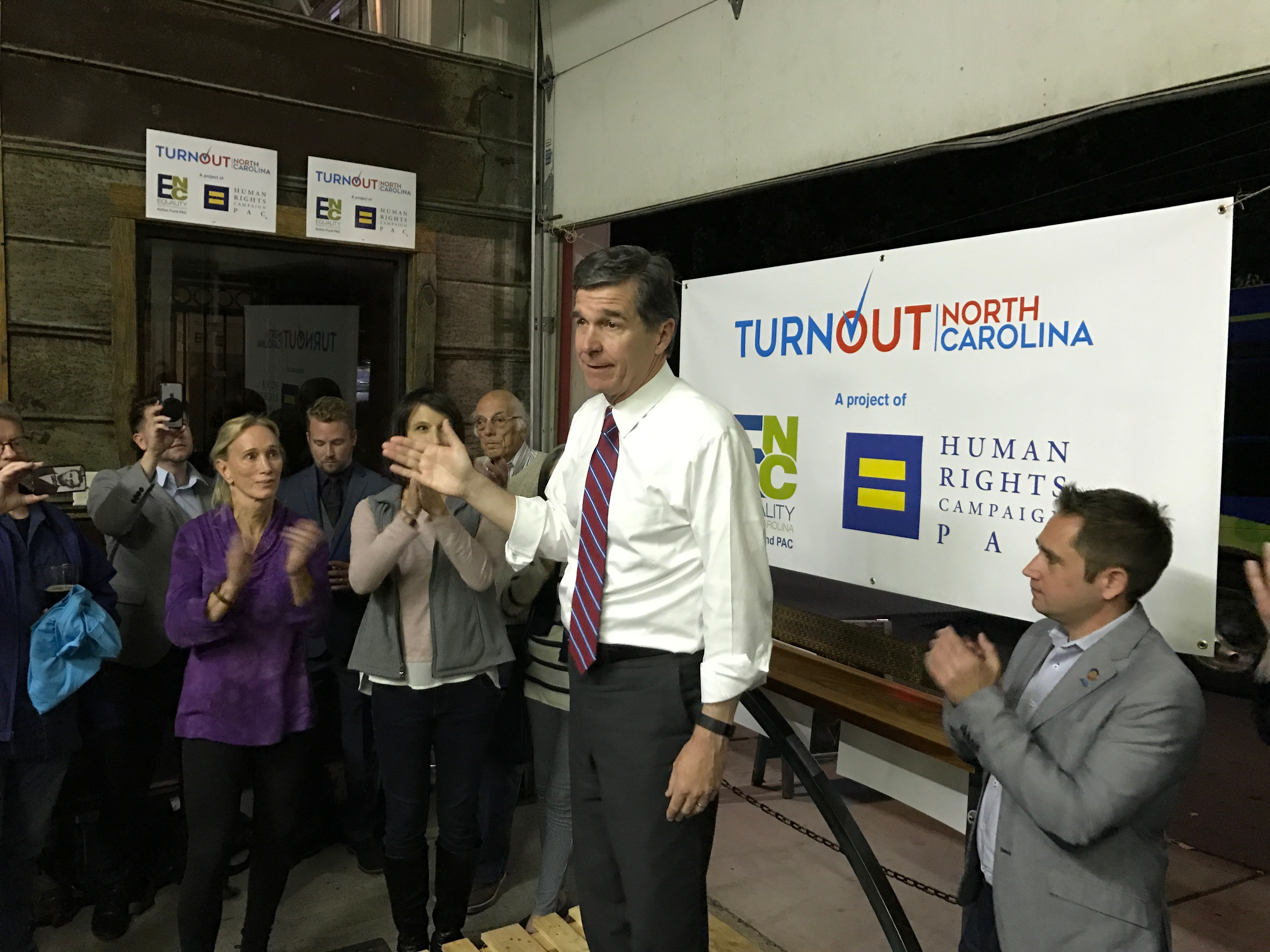
Cooper campaigning in October 2016

Cooper ran for governor of North Carolina in the 2016 election against incumbent Republican Pat McCrory. In March 2016, the North Carolina General Assembly passed the Public Facilities Privacy & Security Act—commonly known as "House Bill 2"—which McCrory signed into law. Numerous corporations began boycotting the state in protest of the law, cancelling job investment and expansion plans. Cooper denounced the law as unconstitutional and refused to defend it in court in his capacity as attorney general.

As a result of the economic damage the law caused, McCrory's approval rating fell dramatically in the months before the election. When initial election results showed Cooper leading, McCrory claimed without evidence that the election had been manipulated by voter fraud. Recounts resulted in slightly higher margins of victory for Cooper, and after an extended legal battle, McCrory conceded the election on December 5. Out of 4.7 million total ballots, Cooper won by 10,227 votes.

==== 2020 ====
On December 5, 2019, Cooper announced his candidacy for reelection. He won the November 3 election, defeating Republican nominee Lieutenant Governor Dan Forest 51.52% to 47.01%.

=== Transition ===
Dismayed by Cooper's win, in late 2016 the General Assembly passed special legislation before he was inaugurated to reduce the power of the governor's office. In what The New York Times described as a "surprise special session", Republican legislators moved to strip Cooper's powers before he assumed the governorship. Throughout December, Cooper oversaw an attempt to repeal the Public Facilities Privacy & Security Act. The repeal attempt failed after a deal between state Republican and Democratic lawmakers and Charlotte officials fell apart.

=== Tenure ===
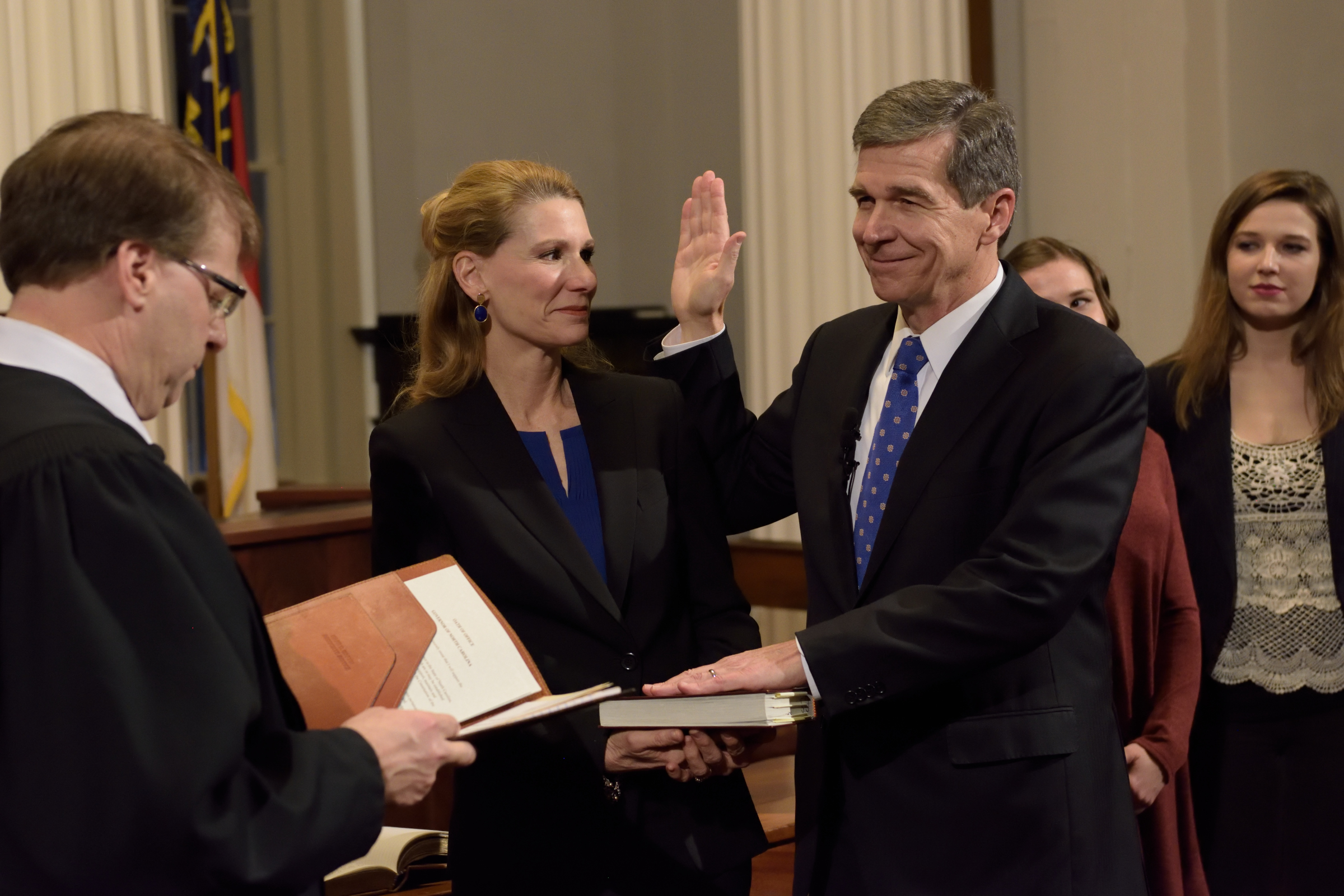
Cooper being sworn in as governor of North Carolina

Cooper was sworn in as governor on January 1, 2017, in a small ceremony. His planned public inauguration was canceled due to a snowstorm.

After taking office, as of January 6, 2017, Cooper requested federal approval for Medicaid coverage expansion in North Carolina. Effective January 15, a federal judge halted Cooper's request, an order that expired on January 29. In his first months in office, Cooper focused on repealing the Public Facilities Privacy & Security Act. After long negotiations with Republican state legislators, Cooper agreed in late March to sign a law prohibiting North Carolina cities from passing local ordinances pertaining to public accommodations or employment practices for three years in exchange for the reversal of the facilities act. On May 9, 2017, President Donald Trump appointed Cooper to a commission tasked with reducing opioid addiction.

After the U.S. Supreme Court declared North Carolina's legislative maps unconstitutional, Cooper called for a special redistricting session on June 7, 2017, but the House and Senate canceled the session, calling it unconstitutional. On June 29, Cooper signed the STOP Act, an overhaul of the prescribing and dispensing regulations of opioids.

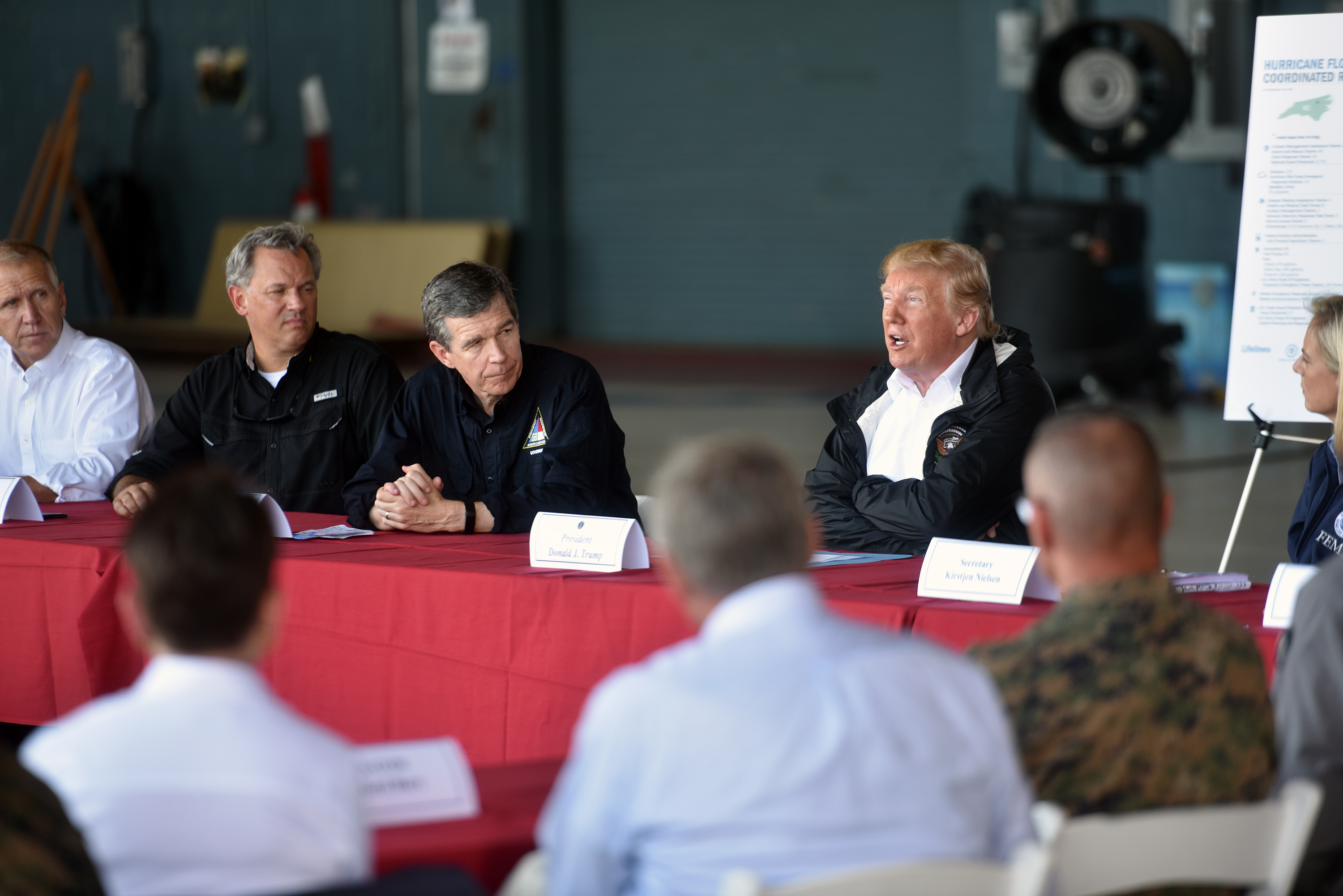
Governor Cooper, Lieutenant Governor Dan Forest and Senator Thom Tillis meet with President Donald Trump, September 2018

On July 1, Cooper signed into law a bill that allows alcohol sales after 10 AM on Sundays, nicknamed the "Brunch Bill". On July 11, he signed "Britny's Law", which makes homicide first-degree murder if the killing was committed with malice and the defendant has been convicted of domestic violence or stalking the victim. He also signed bills to allow domestic violence protective orders granted by a judge to fully go into effect even when they are under appeal and to expand the state's "revenge porn" law from cases involving former lovers to those involving strangers. On July 12, Cooper signed a bill that would add lessons on what to do when pulled over by law enforcement to the state's driver's education curriculum. The bill passed both chambers unanimously.

On July 26, 2017, Cooper signed a bill to mount cameras on school buses in order to discourage drivers from illegally passing stopped buses. On August 31, 2017, he declared a state of emergency due to plummeting gas supply, which was rescinded on September 18.

Fellow Appalachian governors elected Cooper co-chair of the Appalachian Regional Commission for 2019, making him the first North Carolina governor to co-chair the ARC since Jim Hunt in 1978. In the 2018 elections, the Republican Party lost seats in the General Assembly, ending its supermajorities in both houses and rendering it unable to override gubernatorial vetoes. On March 6, 2019, Cooper proposed a $25.2 billion budget for the year. It included salary increases for public school teachers and state workers, expansion of Medicaid, and a $3.9 billion bond (subject to a referendum) to help fund school construction and local infrastructure projects. Cooper said that he was confident he could get the legislature, without enough Republican members to override a veto, to implement some of his ideas.

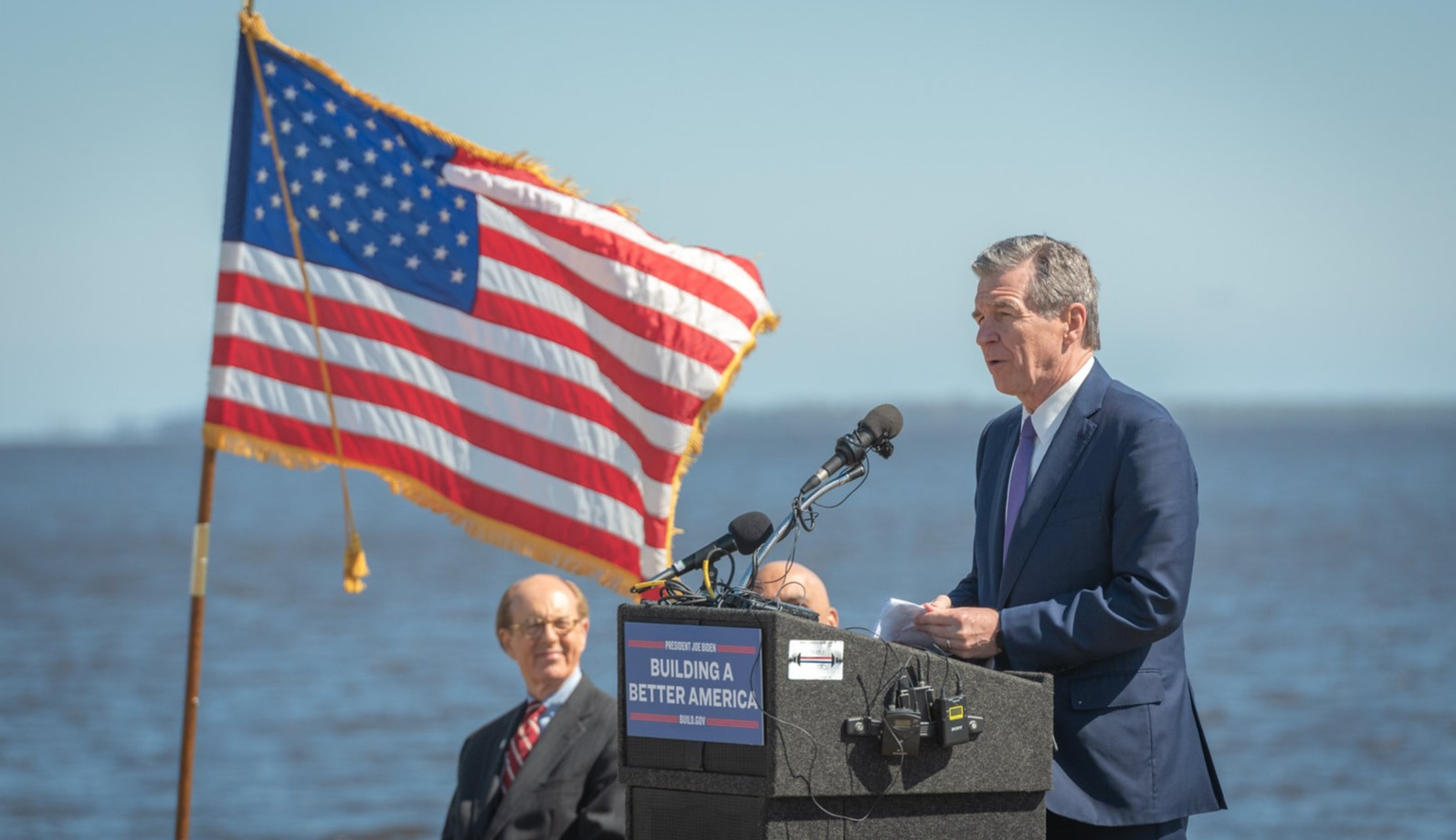
Governor Cooper giving a speech in Tyrrell County, March 2023

On February 11, 2020, Cooper announced the creation of a Novel Coronavirus Task Force for North Carolina ahead of the COVID-19 pandemic. On March 10, Cooper declared a state of emergency after the seventh reported case was identified in the state. Four days later, he issued an executive order banning gatherings of over 100 people, and closed all K-12 schools for two weeks. In June, he imposed a statewide face mask requirement for all areas open to the public.

It was speculated that Cooper might run for the U.S. Senate seat held by retiring Republican Richard Burr in 2022, but he announced in March 2021 that he would not.

On March 27, 2023, Cooper signed into law landmark legislation expanding Medicaid after the Republican-controlled General Assembly passed the bill through both houses, despite almost a decade of GOP opposition. It is estimated that over 600,000 low-income North Carolinians will become eligible for the state's Medicaid program.

In 2023, Cooper declared a "public school emergency" after Republicans in the state legislature proposed expanding the school choice opportunity scholarship program.

After President Joe Biden withdrew from the 2024 presidential election and Vice President Kamala Harris announced her presidential campaign in July 2024, Cooper was named as a possible running mate for her. He was reportedly seriously considered for the position and received vetting materials during the process, but on July 29, he withdrew his name from consideration without giving a reason.

On December 31, 2024, a day before leaving office, Cooper commuted the sentences of 15 inmates on North Carolina's death row. Cooper was succeeded by Josh Stein.

==== Vetoes ====
Cooper completing his veto of NC Senate Bill 20 in May 2023

During his first two years in office, Cooper faced a Republican supermajority in the General Assembly capable of overriding his vetoes, thereby limiting his legislative influence. His first veto as governor was of a bill that would make elections to the North Carolina Superior Court and to the District Court partisan, after being conducted on a nonpartisan basis for many years. The House overrode the veto on March 22, 2017. The Senate followed suit on March 23, resulting in the bill becoming law over Cooper's objection.

Cooper vetoed a bill on April 21, 2017, to reduce the size of the North Carolina Court of Appeals by three judges. The veto was overridden on April 26. He also vetoed a bill on April 21, 2017, that would create a new State Board of Elections (and new county boards of elections) split evenly between the Republicans and the Democrats. It would replace the longstanding system that gave the governor's party a majority on the board. Both houses of the legislature voted to override the veto on April 24 and 25.

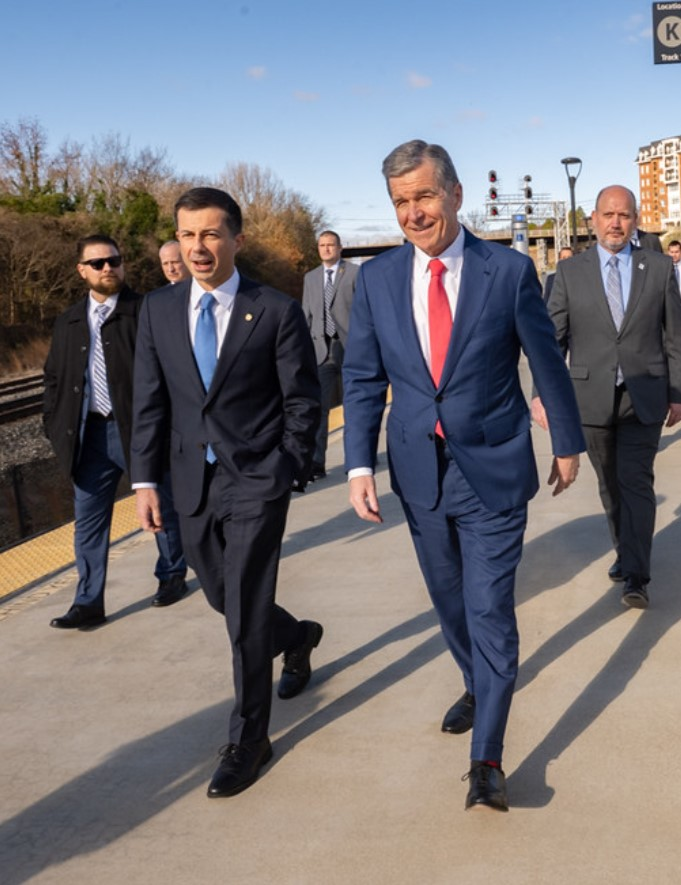
Cooper walking with U.S. Transportation Secretary Pete Buttigieg in 2023

Cooper also vetoed a bill that would limit individuals' ability to sue hog farms. The legislature also overrode this veto. On June 27, Cooper vetoed the proposed state budget, which he had called "irresponsible" the day before. In his veto message, he cited the budget's income tax cuts and argued it "lacks structural integrity by failing to account for population growth, inflation and looming federal reductions, by using one-time revenue for recurring expenses, and by adopting a tax plan that will cause the state to fail to fund promised teacher salary increases in future years". He said the proposed bill included "provisions that infringe upon the governor's ability to faithfully execute the laws, including the administration of this Act, as required by the Constitution, and violating the separation of powers". The legislature overrode his veto the next day.

In July 2017, Cooper vetoed a bill to authorize nonprofit organizations to operate "game nights", saying it would unintentionally create a new opportunity for the video poker industry.

In December 2018, the North Carolina General Assembly passed a bill that would require new primary elections if a do-over election was called in the 9th district election. Cooper vetoed the bill due to a provision that made campaign finance investigations less public, but the General Assembly overrode his veto. In total, during his first two years in office, Cooper vetoed 28 bills, 23 of which were overridden by the legislature. As a result of the 2018 legislative elections, the Republicans lost their supermajority in the General Assembly, thus giving Cooper and legislative Democrats more leverage in legislative negotiations.

In May 2019, Cooper vetoed a bill that proposed punishments in the form of prison time and fines against physicians and nurses who do not resuscitate newborns that survive an abortion. He said that the "bill is an unnecessary interference between doctors and their patients" and that laws "already protect newborn babies".

In September 2024, Cooper vetoed a bill to expand school choice opportunity scholarships and to require county sheriffs in North Carolina to cooperate with ICE.

== 2026 U.S. Senate campaign ==
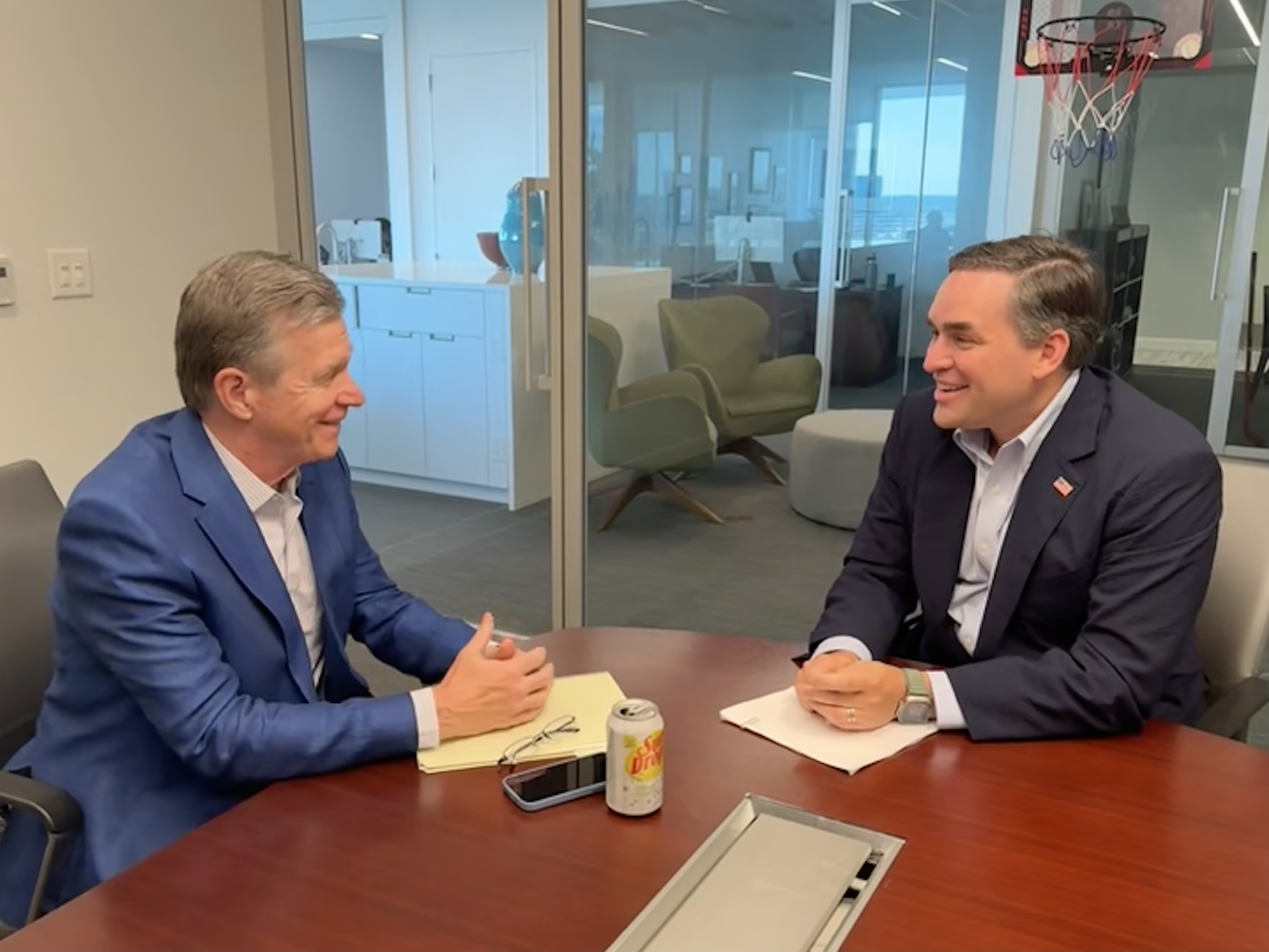
Wiley Nickel endorsing Roy Cooper for Senate

On July 28, 2025, Cooper announced that he would run for the U.S. Senate in North Carolina in 2026, seeking to succeed Republican incumbent Thom Tillis, who had announced his retirement earlier that month.

In 2025, former U.S. Representative Wiley Nickel announced his candidacy for the United States Senate in the 2026 election. He withdrew from the race in July 2025 following Cooper's entry into the race and endorsed him for the Democratic nomination.

Cooper maintained a wide lead in polling for the entire primary cycle and comfortably won the U.S. Senate seat 59% to 39%, making him the first Democratic Senator from North Carolina in almost 12 years since Kay Hagan.

== Personal life ==
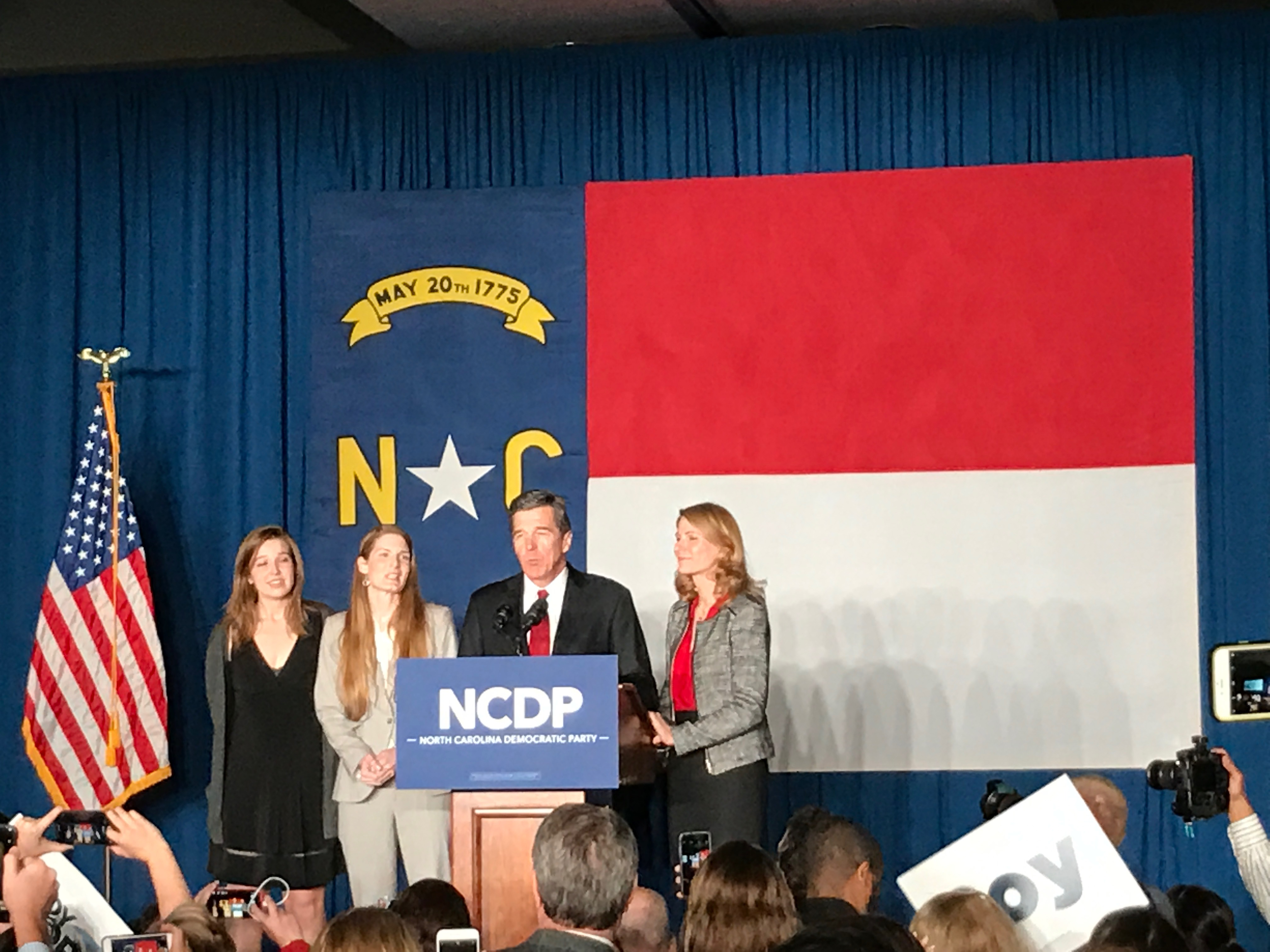
Roy Cooper and his family at a campaign rally, November 2016

Roy Cooper is married to Kristin Cooper (née Bernhardt), who worked as a guardian ad litem for foster children in Wake County. They have three daughters, who all graduated from the University of North Carolina at Chapel Hill. Cooper has taught Sunday school classes, serving as a deacon and elder at White Memorial Presbyterian Church, and is an avid fan of the NHL's Carolina Hurricanes. He became a member of the Sons of the American Revolution in 2018.

Cooper accepted a teaching position at Harvard University after his term as governor ended.

=== Pronunciation of surname ===
In 2023, Cooper said that his last name should actually be pronounced /ˈkʊpər/, with the letters "oo" resembling the "oo" sound in "foot", as opposed to the more frequently used /ˈkuːpər/, (where the letters "oo" make the same sound as in "soon") which most people have called him for many years. He explained that the former is a local pronunciation of "Cooper" in Eastern North Carolina, where he grew up in Nash County, and his name was always said this way until he went to college. He said that he is fine with people using the more common pronunciation.

== Publications ==
=== Articles ===
- "I'm the Governor of North Carolina. This Fringe Claim Before the Supreme Court Would Upend Democracy". The New York Times. December 5, 2022.

== Electoral history ==
=== North Carolina Attorney General ===
==== 2000 ====
General election
Party	Candidate	Votes	%
Democratic	Roy Cooper	1,446,793	51.21
Republican	Dan Boyce	1,310,845	46.40
Reform	Margaret Palms	67,536	2.39
Total votes		2,825,174	100.00

==== 2004 ====
Roy Cooper ran unopposed in the 2004 Democratic primary.

General election
Party	Candidate	Votes	%
Democratic	Roy Cooper (inc.)	1,872,097	55.61
Republican	Joe Knott	1,494,121	44.39
Total votes		3,366,218	100.00

==== 2008 ====

Roy Cooper ran unopposed in the 2008 Democratic primary.

General election
Party	Candidate	Votes	%
Democratic	Roy Cooper (inc.)	2,538,178	61.10
Republican	Bob Crumley	1,615,762	38.90
Total votes		4,153,940	100.00

==== 2012 ====

Roy Cooper was the only candidate to file before the state's February 29 deadline, he ran unopposed in both the Democratic Primary and General Election.

General election
Party	Candidate	Votes	%
Democratic	Roy Cooper (inc.)	2,828,941	100.00
Total votes		2,828,941	100.00

=== Governor of North Carolina ===
==== 2016 ====

Democratic primary
Party	Candidate	Votes	%
Democratic	Roy Cooper	710,658	68.70
Democratic	Ken Spaulding	323,774	31.30
Total votes		1,034,432	100.00

General election
Party	Candidate	Votes	%	±%
Democratic	Roy Cooper	2,309,162	49.02	
Republican	Pat McCrory	2,298,881	48.80	
Libertarian	Lon Cecil	102,978	2.19	
Turnout		4,711,021		

==== 2020 ====

Primary election
Party	Candidate	Votes	%
Democratic	Roy Cooper (inc.)	1,128,829	87.19
Democratic	Ernest T. Reeves	165,804	12.81
Total votes		1,294,633	100.00

General election
Party	Candidate	Votes	%	±%
Democratic	Roy Cooper (inc.)	2,834,790	51.52%	
Republican	Dan Forest	2,586,604	47.01%	
Libertarian	Steven J. DiFiore	60,449	1.10%	
Constitution	Al Pisano	20,934	0.38%	
Total votes		5,502,777	100.0%	

== Notes ==
North Carolina Senate
Preceded by Richard Conder	Majority Leader of the North Carolina Senate; 1997–2001	Succeeded by Tony Rand
Party political offices
Preceded by Mike Easley	Democratic nominee for Attorney General of North Carolina; 2000, 2004, 2008, 2012	Succeeded by Josh Stein
Preceded by Walter Dalton	Democratic nominee for Governor of North Carolina; 2016, 2020	Succeeded by Josh Stein
Preceded by Michelle Lujan Grisham	Chair of the Democratic Governors Association; 2021–2022	Succeeded by Phil Murphy
Preceded by Cal Cunningham	Democratic nominee for U.S. Senator from North Carolina (Class 2); 2026	Most recent
Legal offices
Preceded by Mike Easley	Attorney General of North Carolina; 2001–2017	Succeeded by Josh Stein
Political offices
Preceded by Pat McCrory	Governor of North Carolina; 2017–2025	Succeeded by Josh Stein
U.S. Senate
Preceded by Thom Tillis	U.S. Senator (Class 2) from North Carolina; Taking office 2027; Served alongside: Ted Budd	Elect
U.S. order of precedence (ceremonial)
Preceded by Pat McCrory as Former Governor	Order of precedence of the United States; Within North Carolina	Succeeded by Jack Markell as Former Governor
Preceded by Pat McCrory as Former Governor	Order of precedence of the United States; Outside North Carolina	Succeeded by Philip W. Noel as Former Governor
