= Former Jamestown High School =

Historic school building in North Carolina, United States

- Jamestown High School, Former
- U.S. National Register of Historic Places
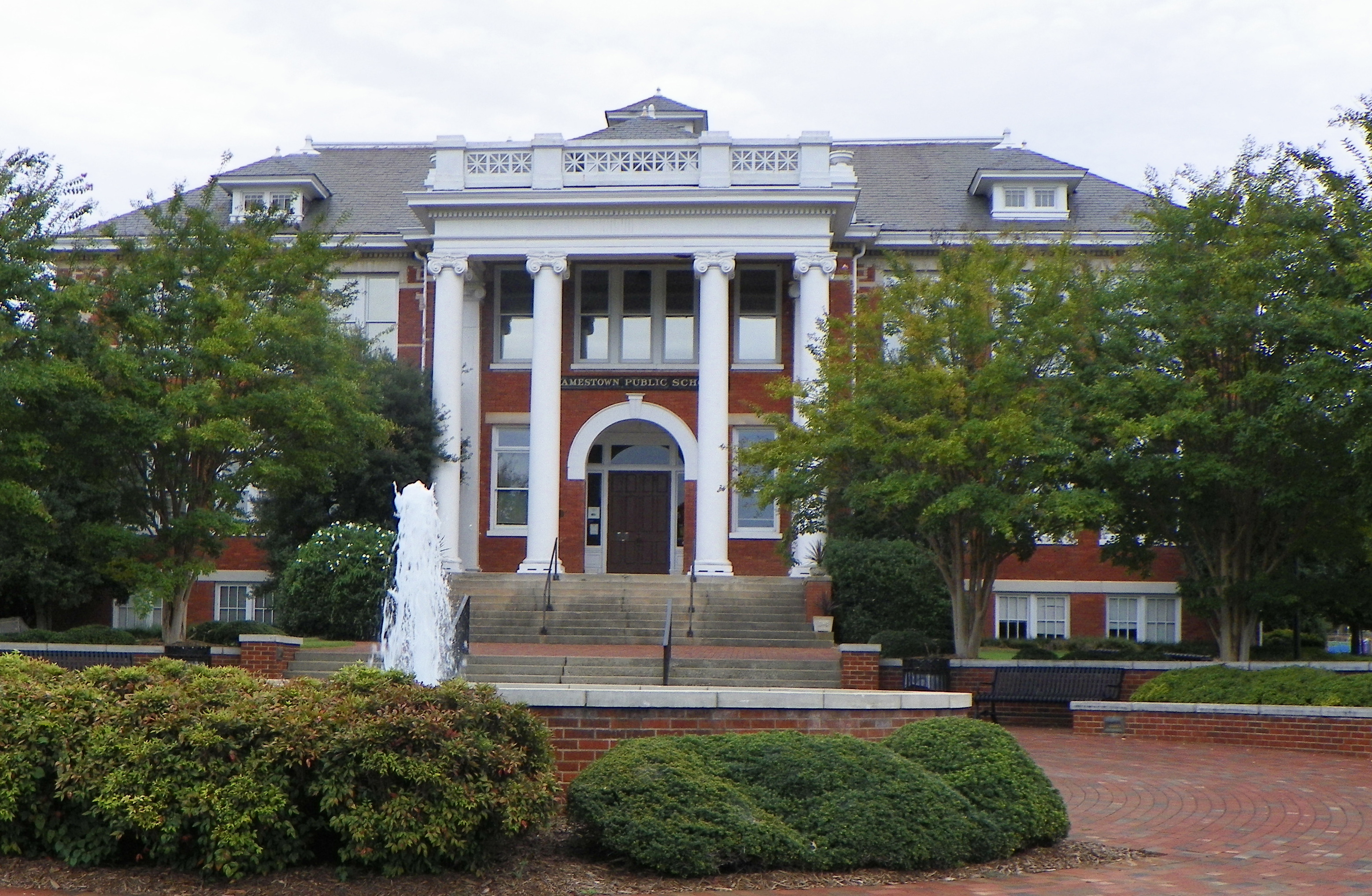
- Jamestown High School, Former, September 2014

- Location within North Carolina Location within the United States
- Location: 200 W. Main St., Jamestown, North Carolina
- Coordinates: 35°59′36″N 79°56′21″W
- Area: 2.8 acres (1.1 ha)
- Built: 1915
- Architect: Harge, Charles E.; Brooks & Hunt
- Architectural style: Classical Revival
- NRHP reference No.: 91001779
- Added to NRHP: December 6, 1991

Jamestown High School, Former, also known as Jamestown Public School, is a historic school building located at Jamestown, Guilford County, North Carolina. It was designed by architect Charles E. Hartge and built in 1915. It is a 2 1/2-story, Classical Revival-style brick building with cast stone detailing. It features a full-height tetrastyle entrance portico supported by Ionic order columns and pilasters. The building underwent a major rehabilitation and adaptive reuse in 1986 and 1987.

It was listed on the National Register of Historic Places in 1991.
