= Charles E. Hartge =

American architect

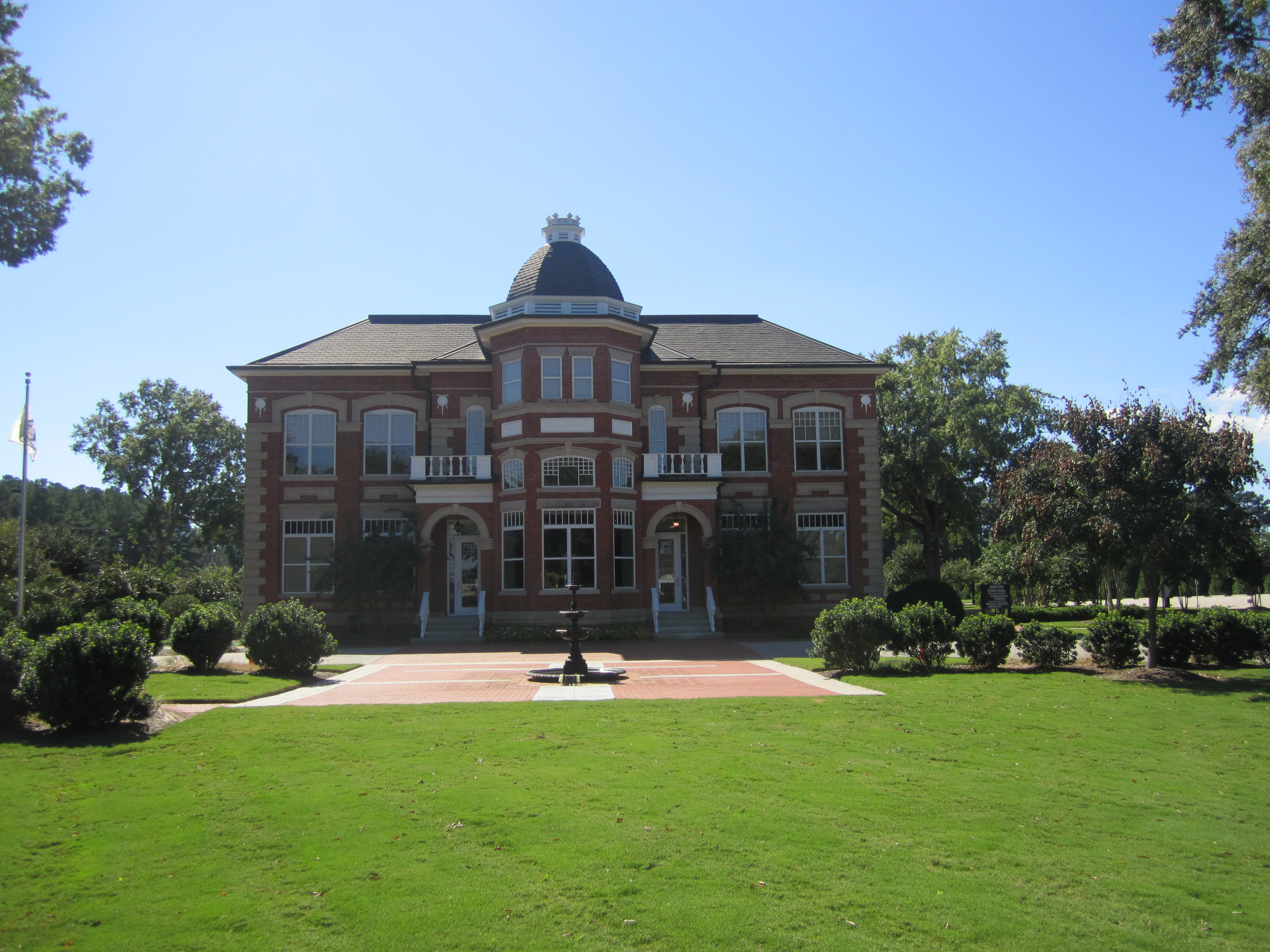
Wakelon School, in 2011, after renovation to serve as Zebulon town hall

Charles E. Hartge (September 1, 1865 – October 25, 1918) was an American architect who was born in Hamburg, Germany as Carl Emil Hartge. His work still stands today in North Carolina.

He designed numerous churches, schools and other buildings in North Carolina.

At least one of his works is listed on the U.S. National Register of Historic Places.

Works include:

- Former Jamestown High School, built 1915, Jamestown, North Carolina, NRHP-listed
- Wakelon School, built 1908, Arendell St. Zebulon, North Carolina (Hartge, C.E.), NRHP-listed
