= Pell Cooper =

American judge and attorney

Judge of the 7th Judicial District Court of North Carolina
- Incumbent
- Assumed office 1999

Personal details
- Born: 1959 (age 66–67) Nashville, North Carolina, U.S.
- Party: Democratic
- Spouse: Meredith Garriss
- Parent: Roy Asberry Cooper II (father)
- Relatives: Roy Cooper (brother)
- Education: University of North Carolina at Chapel Hill (BA, JD); University of Paris
- Occupation: lawyer, judge, businessman, farmer

Pell C. Cooper (/ˈkʊpər/ KUUP-ər; born 1959) is an American attorney, judge, and businessman. He has served as a judge for the 7th Judicial District Court of North Carolina since 1999.

== Early life and education ==
Cooper was born in Nashville, North Carolina, to Beverly Thorne Batchelor Cooper, a teacher, and Roy Asberry Cooper II, a lawyer and Democratic Party operative who was a close advisor to Governor Jim Hunt. He is the brother of former Governor and U.S. senator-elect Roy Cooper. He descends from Marcom Cooper, who served as both Grand Juror and Petit Juror during the American Revolutionary War.

He earned a bachelor of arts degree from the University of North Carolina at Chapel Hill in 1984. Cooper also spent a year, in 1982, at the Sorbonne in Paris. He earned a Juris Doctor degree from the University of North Carolina School of Law in 1988.

== Career ==
Cooper serves as a judge in Nash County, Edgecombe County, and Wilson County, North Carolina. He joined district 8 in 1999. He was re-elected in 2014.

In 2013, Cooper presented the Nashville Chamber of Commerce's Distinguished Citizen Award to Eddie McKoy. In 2019, he was the guest speaker at the Nashville Chamber of Commerce's Distinguished Citizen and Junior Achievement Awards reception.

== Personal life ==
Cooper is married to Meredith Garriss. They live in Rocky Mount, North Carolina.

In 1996, Cooper and his brother purchased land from their father where they established Will Clark Properties LLC, a real estate investment company. The 40-acre farm in Nash County was leased to Strata Solar, a solar energy company based in Durham, North Carolina. The management of the farm was later handed over to his wife.

On August 12, 2018, a house owned by Cooper and his brother, located at 111 S Lumber Street in Nashville, caught fire.

Cooper became a member of the Sons of the American Revolution in 2018.
