= Joanna Saleeby Knott =

American businesswoman and retired golfer

Personal information
- Spouse: Brad Knott
- Children: 2

Career
- Sport: Golf
- College: North Carolina State University

Joanna Saleeby Knott is an American businesswoman and former collegiate golfer. She played golf for the NC State Wolfpack and competed in the amateur circuit. Knott is married to U.S. Congressman Brad Knott.

== Education and golf career ==
Knott attended Needham B. Broughton High School before transferring to St. David's School, an Episcopal day school in Raleigh, North Carolina.

She played on the golf team at North Carolina State University. She did not play from 2005 to 2006. From 2006 to 2007, she placed at T36 in the Harder Hall Invitational and played in the NCAA East Regional Championship. That season she was a recipient of the Linda and Leon Marsh Most Improved Award.

From 2007 to 2008, she placed in the Final 64 at the North & South Women's Amateur tournament, 4th at the Women's Eastern Amateur tournament, and finished 19th, earning her first career top 20 finish, at the NMSU Price Invitational. She also shot a career low-one over 73 during the third round of the Lady Tar Heel Invitational. Knott placed 28th at the ACC Championship and tied for 30th place at the Lady Seahawk Invitational. During the 2009 to 2010 season, she played in four tournaments with the team and three tournaments as an individual. In 2009, she paled T17 at the Women's Eastern Amateur tournament. At the Pinehurst Challenge, Knott shot 74 in the second round, finishing in a tie for 38th place at 15 over.

Knott's sister, Julie Saleeby, also played golf at NC State.

In 2010, she was the runner-up in the Carolinas Young Amateur Women’s Championship in Pinehurst, North Carolina.

== Fashion career ==
Knott worked as a sales associate, buyer, and retail manager. In 2018, she opened Monkee's of Raleigh, a high-end women's boutique in the North Hills neighborhood in Raleigh. In 2020, North Hills was the site of protests associated with the Black Lives Matter movement. Some stores in the neighborhood were looted, and while Knott was heckled by protestors, her store was not damaged in the protests.

== Personal life ==
She is married to Brad Knott, a Republican U.S. Congressman for North Carolina's 13th District, and has two children.

Knott is a conservative and a Christian.
