= Julia Boseman =

American politician

Julia Olson-Boseman

Member of the North Carolina Senate from the 9th district
- In office January 2005 – January 2011
- Preceded by: Woody White
- Succeeded by: Thom Goolsby

Personal details
- Born: August 20, 1966 (age 60) New Hanover County, North Carolina, U.S.
- Party: Republican (2022–present); Democratic (1999–2022)
- Profession: Attorney

Julia Olson-Boseman is an American politician, who served as a Democratic member of the North Carolina Senate. She represented the state's ninth Senate district, covering all of New Hanover County, from January 2005 to January 2011. She ran in 2010 for District Court Judge in New Hanover County and finished third in the race. In 2016, she ran again for New Hanover County Commission and finished in fourth place where the top three candidates serve.

== Early life and career ==
She was born and raised in New Hanover County and attended the University of North Carolina at Wilmington before going on to North Carolina Central University in 1992 for a Juris Doctor degree. She has been a practicing attorney since. The 2024 Spring Quarterly of the North Carolina State Bar reports she was disbarred.

== Political career ==
Boseman was elected to the New Hanover County Board of Commissioners in 2000. In 2004, she ran for the North Carolina Senate and beat Republican incumbent Sen. Woody White by a margin of only 885 votes, 50.55% to 49.45%. White had been appointed six months earlier to finish the term of Sen. Patrick Ballantine who had resigned from the senate in order to make an unsuccessful run for governor.

In her first Senate term (2005–06), Julia Boseman was ranked the 20th most effective senator (of 50), giving her the highest ranking for a first-term female senator and the second highest for a freshman. The ratings were published by the North Carolina Center for Public Policy Research (NCCPPR), which has published biennial surveys ranking the effectiveness of legislators based on the opinions of lobbyists, reporters and legislators themselves since 1978.

She was a candidate for re-election in 2006 and defeated her Republican opponent, Al Roseman, by a margin of 11,000 votes. Her 2008 re-election was closer, with Boseman taking 51.7% of the vote and winning by a margin of about 3,000.

In the 2008 presidential primaries, Boseman was an active supporter of Hillary Clinton. The North Carolina primary, coming late in the process, was unusually high-profile and Boseman travelled the state campaigning with Clinton and her husband, former President Bill Clinton. In January 2009, Bill Clinton returned the favor, hosting a fundraising reception for Boseman in Raleigh.

Boseman announced in 2009 that she would not seek re-election to a fourth term in 2010. Her senate term ended in January 2011 and she was succeeded by Republican Thom Goolsby.

In 2016 Boseman ran again for New Hanover Commission and placed fifth in a race that saw the top three elected. Woody White, Patricia Kusek and Jonathan Barfield finished as the top vote winners. Derrick Hickey came in fourth followed by Julia Boseman and Nelson Beaulieu. In 2018, she was elected to a seat on the Commission, serving with Rob Zapple and eventually becoming chair.

== Personal life ==
She is notable for her many achievements whilst serving her NCGA constituents and as the first openly gay member of the North Carolina General Assembly.She is estranged from her wife.

Preceded by Woody White	Member of the North Carolina Senate from the 9th district January 2005–January 2011	Succeeded by Thom Goolsby
