= Wendell Sawyer =

American politician and lawyer (1951–2020)

Wendell H. Sawyer (8 February 1951 – 18 June 2020) was an American politician.

Sawyer defeated incumbent Rachel Gray during the 1984 state legislative elections, and was seated to the North Carolina Senate. He contested the Republican Party primary for the 1988 North Carolina lieutenant gubernatorial election. The election was won by eventual Republican nominee Jim Gardner. In 2004, he ran for the Republican nomination for Attorney General in North Carolina, but lost the nomination to Joe Knott.

Outside of politics, Sawyer practiced law for forty years. He was a resident of Greensboro and died while on a beach vacation on 18 June 2020, aged 69.
