= St. David's School (Raleigh, North Carolina) =

Private, Christian school in Raleigh, North Carolina, USA

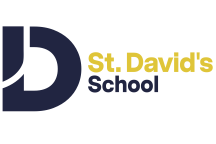

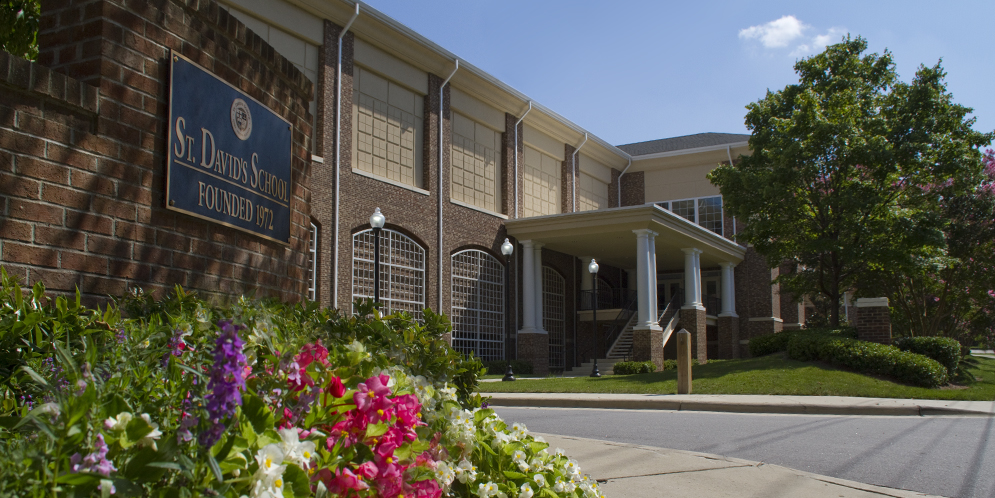

Location
- 3400 White Oak Road; Raleigh, North Carolina 27609; United States; 35°49′23″N 78°39′1″W

Information
- Type: Private, Episcopal
- Established: 1972 (54 years ago)
- CEEB code: 343236
- Headmaster: Kenneth C. Cheeseman
- Faculty: 110
- Grades: PK–12
- Enrollment: Over 700
- Campus type: Suburban
- Colors: Blue and gold
- Athletics: North Carolina Independent Schools Athletic Association (NCISAA)
- Mascot: Warriors
- Accreditation: SACS and SAIS
- Tuition: varies from $14,900 (PK) to $30,500 (grades 7–12)
- Affiliations: NAIS and NCAIS
- Website: www.stdavidsraleigh.org

St. David's School is a private, independent, Episcopal preparatory day school in Raleigh, North Carolina. Originally founded as Hale High School, the school later merged with St. Timothy's Middle School to become St. Timothy's-Hale School. It became a separate institution from St. Timothy's in 2002 and was renamed St. David's School in 2003.

== History ==
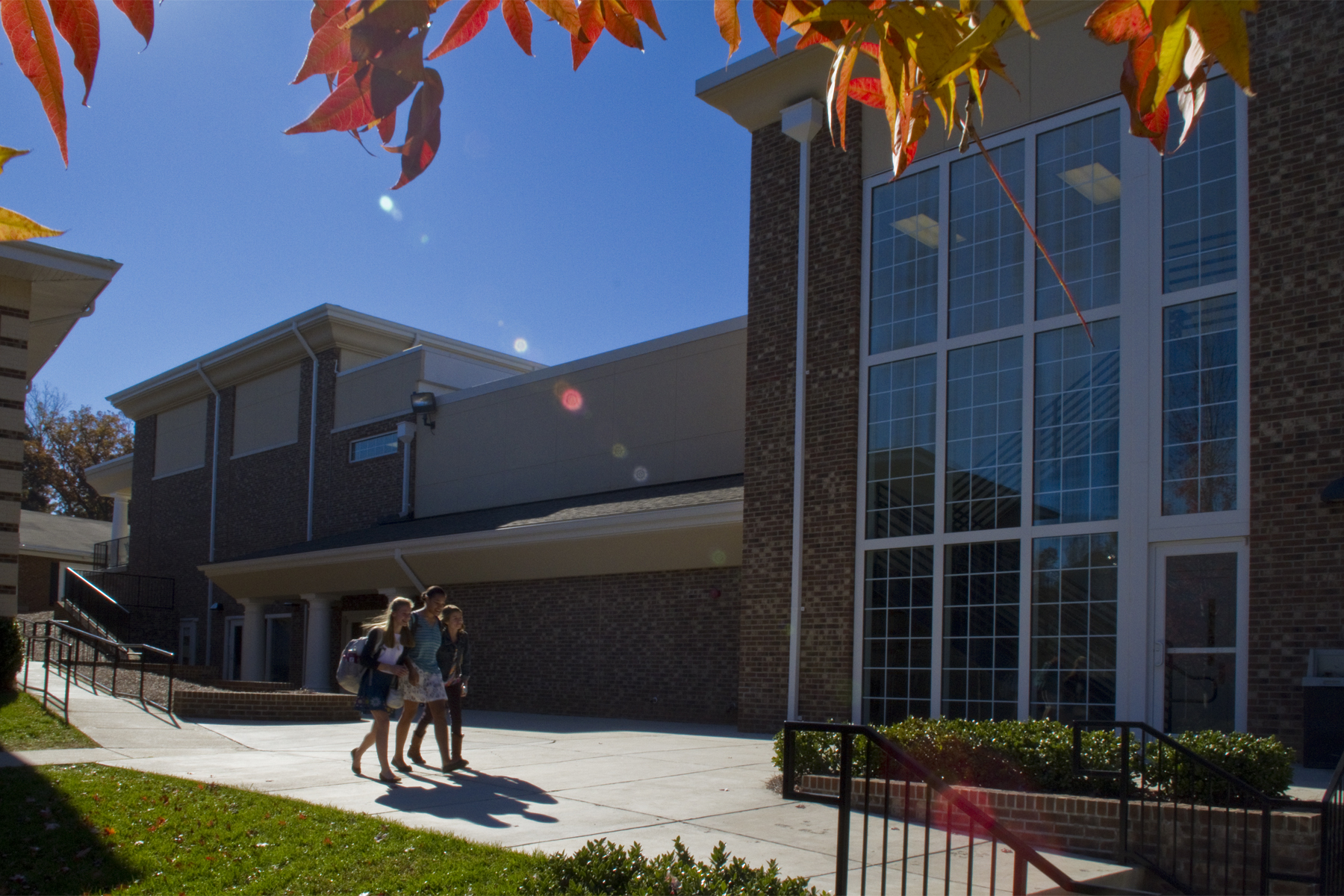
St. David's School (Raleigh, North Carolina)

Founded as Hale High School by the Vestry of St. Timothy's Episcopal Church and Board of Trustees of St. Timothy's School of Raleigh (founded 1958), the school graduated its first class in 1973. In the fall of 1990, the Middle School of St. Timothy's, grades 6th through 8th, was moved from its Six Forks Road campus to Hale's White Oak Road campus. By the end of the school year, the board of trustees voted to combine Hale High School and St. Timothy's Middle School, resulting in the emergence of St. Timothy's-Hale School. The Board of St. Timothy's-Hale School later voted to sever from St. Timothy's School of Raleigh and the institutions became separate and independent of one another. The Board of St. Timothy's School of Raleigh also reestablished a Middle School on the original Six Forks Road campus to rejoin its Lower School, grades Pre-K through 5.

In November 2002, the board of the newly independent St. Timothy's-Hale School voted to add grades K–4 for the fall of 2003. In the spring of 2003, the school was renamed St. David's School and was expanded to include all grades, K–12, on the same campus. By the 2007–2008 school year, enrollment at St. David's stood at about 540 students. The 2008–2013 school years brought additional sections in lower school, which brought the student body to today's enrollment of more than 620.

In 2012, an expansion project was completed, including a new gym with a weight room and locker rooms, a student commons area, additional offices and classrooms, a theater, fine art facilities, and a modern dining hall. In 2013, a 32-acre satellite field complex was added for athletics. The Dining Hall was renovated in 2015. A major expansion to the lower school was then finished just before the start of the 2016–2017 school year. Also before the 2016–2017 school year, the former Middle School 7–8 grade building, St. Albans, was torn down to make way for the construction of a new academic building that opened in August 2018.

== Fine arts ==
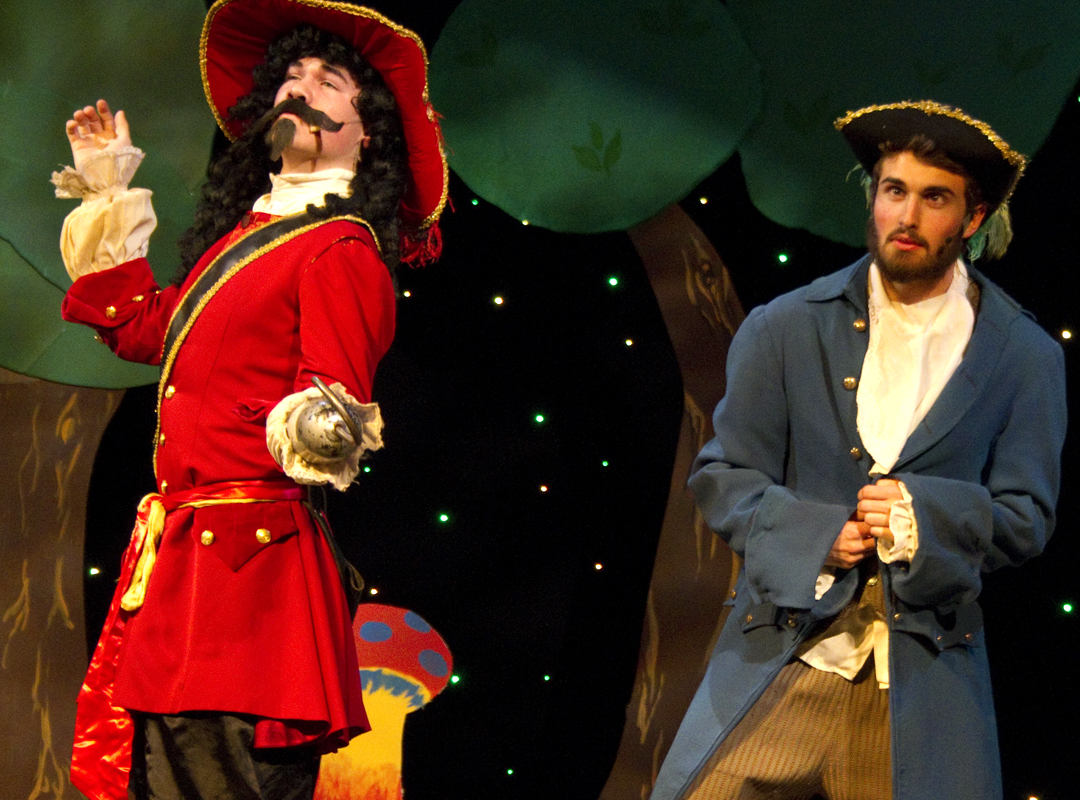
School performance of Peter Pan

Lower school students attend weekly visual and performing arts courses, and middle and upper school programs include visual arts (drawing, painting and design), music (band, a cappella groups, and choir), drama, and media production.

== Athletics ==
St. David's, a member of the North Carolina Independent School Athletic Association (NCISAA), offers 40 boys' and girls' middle school, junior varsity, and varsity interscholastic athletic teams. St. David's is also a member the Capital City Conference (CCC), which includes: Cary Christian School, Grace Christian School (Cary, NC), St. David's School, Trinity Academy, Trinity School of Durham and Chapel Hill and Wake Christian Academy.

St. David's middle school athletics belong to the Capital Area Middle School Conference.

During the 2018-2019 athletic season, the Varsity Girls Tennis team won the 2A State Championship for the seventh year in a row. In 2016–17, Varsity Football was the 2A State Runner-Up, Varsity Girls Soccer was the 2A State Runner-Up, and Varsity Boys Golf won the 2A State Championship.

In the 2014-2015 school year, Varsity Girls Tennis won the 2A State Championship and Varsity Boys Soccer won 2A State Championship.

In the 2013-14 school year, varsity girls tennis won the state championship. In the spring, girls track won the state championship.

In 2015, for the fifth time in six years, St. David's won the Wells Fargo Cup.

In the Spring of 2013, the boys varsity tennis team brought the state title back to Raleigh, defeating Gaston Day School 7–2 in the Championship. The team finished off the year 14–3, including winning their last eight matches.

== Notable alumni ==
- Katelyn Clampett, '06, singer-songwriter
- S. Thomas Currin II, '02, judge
- Brad Knott, '05, U.S. congressman
- Joanna Saleeby Knott, '05, businesswoman and golfer
- Michael La Sasso, '22, professional golfer, 2025 NCAA Champion
