= Harold Parks Helms =

American politician (1935–2023)

Member of the North Carolina House of Representatives
- In office 1974–1984

Personal details
- Born: November 5, 1935 Charlotte, North Carolina, U.S.
- Died: March 18, 2023 (aged 87)
- Party: Democratic
- Spouse: Eleanor Jean Allen (m. 1959)
- Education: University of North Carolina at Chapel Hill; University of North Carolina School of Law

Harold Parks Helms (November 5, 1935 – March 18, 2023) was an American politician. He served as a Democratic member of the North Carolina House of Representatives.

== Life and career ==
Helms was born in Charlotte, North Carolina on November 5, 1935, the son of Ida Parks and Wade H. Helms. He attended Charlotte Technical High School, the University of North Carolina at Chapel Hill and the University of North Carolina School of Law.

In 1974, Helms was elected to the North Carolina House of Representatives, serving until 1984. In 1988, he was a candidate for lieutenant governor of North Carolina.

Helms died on March 18, 2023, at the age of 87.
