= Wakelon School =

Historic school building in North Carolina, United States

- U.S. National Register of Historic Places
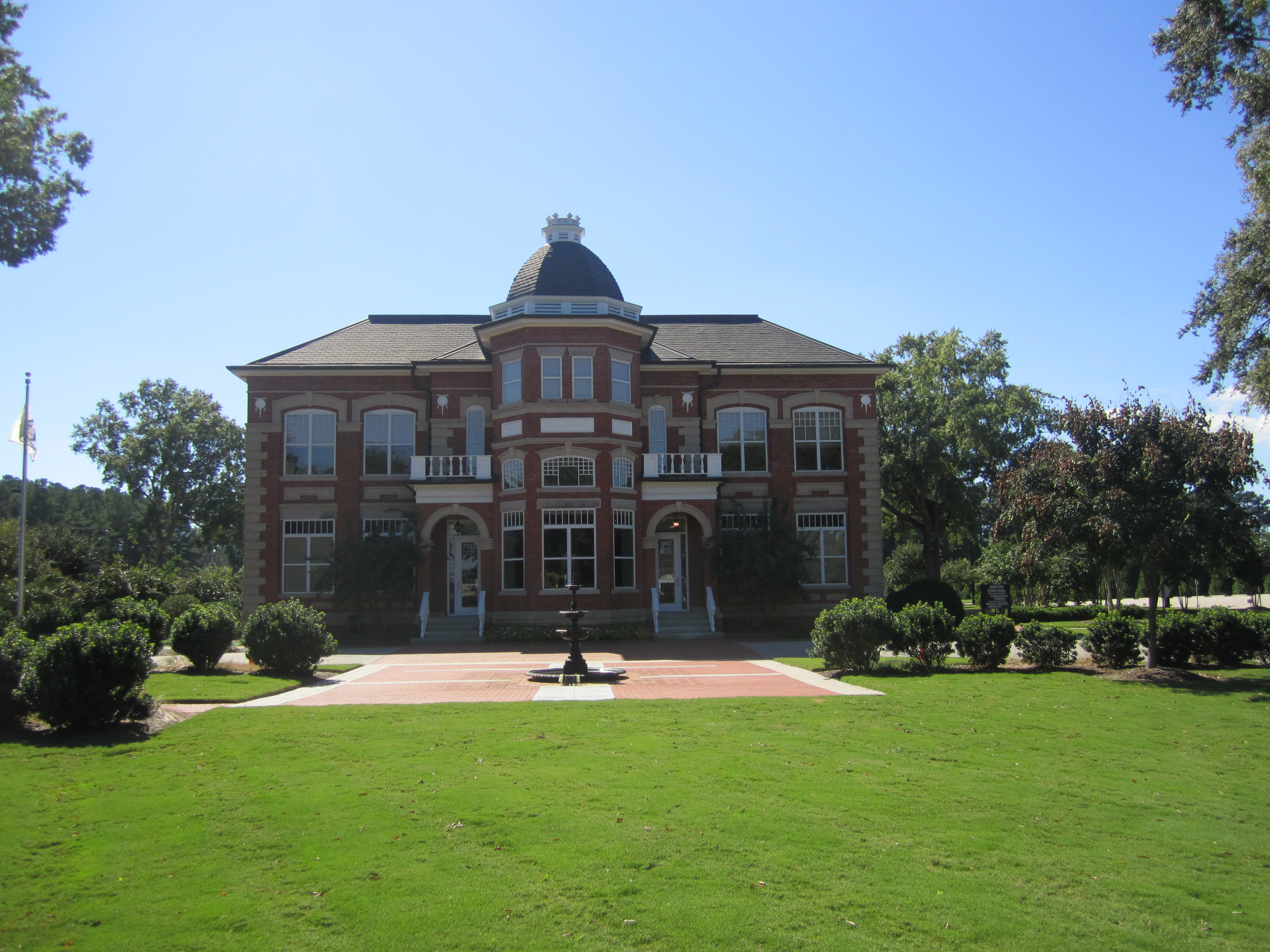

- Location within North Carolina Location within the United States
- Location: 1003 N. Arendell Ave., Zebulon, North Carolina
- Coordinates: 35.8312°N 78.3205°W
- Area: 2 acres (0.81 ha)
- Built: 1908
- Architect: C.E. Hartge
- NRHP reference No.: 76001345
- Added to NRHP: May 13, 1976

The Wakelon School is a historic school building located in Zebulon, Wake County, North Carolina, a suburb of Raleigh. Wakelon was designed by architect Charles E. Hartge and was built in 1908. It served as an elementary school until the student population became too large for the facility. GlaxoSmithKline purchased Wakelon School from the Town of Zebulon in 1986 and used the building for office space. In March 2007 voters approved to repurchase Wakelon to be used as the new town hall. Renovations began in early 2008.

It was listed on the National Register of Historic Places in 1976.

== Notable alumni ==
- J. T. Knott, politician

== See also ==
- List of Registered Historic Places in North Carolina
