= North Carolina's 110th House district =

American legislative district

North Carolina's 110th State House of Representatives district
Representative
Kelly Hastings; R–Cherryville
- Demographics: 67% White; 20% Black; 8% Hispanic; 1% Asian; 1% Other; 4% Multiracial
- Population (2024): 89,129

North Carolina's 110th House district is one of 120 districts in the North Carolina House of Representatives. It has been represented by Republican Kelly Hastings since 2011.

== Geography ==
Since 2003, the district has included part of Gaston and Cleveland counties. The district overlaps with the 43rd and 44th Senate districts.

== District officeholders since 2003 ==
Representative	Party	Dates	Notes	Counties
District created January 1, 2003.				2003–Present; Parts of Gaston and Cleveland counties.
Debbie Clary (Cherryville)	Republican	January 1, 2003 – January 1, 2009	Redistricted from the 48th district. Retired to run for State Senate.	2003–Present; Parts of Gaston and Cleveland counties.
Pearl Burris-Floyd (Dallas)	Republican	January 1, 2009 – January 1, 2011	Lost re-nomination.	2003–Present; Parts of Gaston and Cleveland counties.
Kelly Hastings (Cherryville)	Republican	January 1, 2011 – Present	Lost re-nomination.	2003–Present; Parts of Gaston and Cleveland counties.

== Election results ==
=== 2026 ===
North Carolina House of Representatives 110th district Republican primary election, 2026
Party	Candidate	Votes	%
Republican	Caroline Eason	3,584	53.63%
Republican	Kelly Hastings (incumbent)	3,099	46.37%
Total votes		6,683	100%

North Carolina House of Representatives 110th district general election, 2026
Party	Candidate	Votes	%
Republican	Caroline Eason		
Democratic	Mary Silver		
Total votes			100%

=== 2024 ===
North Carolina House of Representatives 110th district Republican primary election, 2024
Party	Candidate	Votes	%
Republican	Kelly Hastings (incumbent)	7,347	88.15%
Republican	Esther Scott	988	11.85%
Total votes		8,335	100%

North Carolina House of Representatives 110th district general election, 2024
Party	Candidate	Votes	%
Republican	Kelly Hastings (incumbent)	28,418	66.57%
Democratic	Justin Matthews	14,268	33.43%
Total votes		42,686	100%
Republican hold			

=== 2022 ===
North Carolina House of Representatives 110th district general election, 2022
Party	Candidate	Votes	%
Republican	Kelly Hastings (incumbent)	20,551	100%
Total votes		20,551	100%
Republican hold			

=== 2020 ===
North Carolina House of Representatives 110th district general election, 2020
Party	Candidate	Votes	%
Republican	Kelly Hastings (incumbent)	29,399	100%
Total votes		29,399	100%
Republican hold			

=== 2018 ===
North Carolina House of Representatives 110th district Republican primary election, 2018
Party	Candidate	Votes	%
Republican	Kelly Hastings (incumbent)	2,038	61.70%
Republican	Charlene High	1,265	38.30%
Total votes		3,303	100%

North Carolina House of Representatives 110th district general election, 2018
Party	Candidate	Votes	%
Republican	Kelly Hastings (incumbent)	16,708	67.84%
Democratic	Christy McCleary	7,919	32.16%
Total votes		24,627	100%
Republican hold			

=== 2016 ===
North Carolina House of Representatives 110th district general election, 2016
Party	Candidate	Votes	%
Republican	Kelly Hastings (incumbent)	24,931	100%
Total votes		24,931	100%
Republican hold			

=== 2014 ===
North Carolina House of Representatives 110th district general election, 2014
Party	Candidate	Votes	%
Republican	Kelly Hastings (incumbent)	14,394	100%
Total votes		14,394	100%
Republican hold			

=== 2012 ===
North Carolina House of Representatives 110th district Republican primary election, 2012
Party	Candidate	Votes	%
Republican	Kelly Hastings (incumbent)	4,948	63.99%
Republican	Pearl Burris-Floyd	2,784	36.01%
Total votes		7,732	100%

North Carolina House of Representatives 110th district general election, 2012
Party	Candidate	Votes	%
Republican	Kelly Hastings (incumbent)	20,236	63.80%
Democratic	Jamar McKoy	10,465	33.00%
Libertarian	Lewis B. Guignard Jr.	1,015	3.20%
Total votes		31,716	100%
Republican hold			

=== 2010 ===
North Carolina House of Representatives 110th district Republican primary election, 2010
Party	Candidate	Votes	%
Republican	Kelly Hastings	1,368	52.68%
Republican	Pearl Burris-Floyd (incumbent)	1,229	47.32%
Total votes		2,597	100%

North Carolina House of Representatives 110th district general election, 2010
Party	Candidate	Votes	%
Republican	Kelly Hastings	12,433	69.82%
Democratic	John Eaker	5,373	30.18%
Total votes		17,806	100%
Republican hold			

=== 2008 ===
North Carolina House of Representatives 110th district general election, 2008
Party	Candidate	Votes	%
Republican	Pearl Burris-Floyd	14,683	50.88%
Democratic	Davy Lowman	14,173	49.12%
Total votes		28,856	100%
Republican hold			

=== 2006 ===
North Carolina House of Representatives 110th district general election, 2006
Party	Candidate	Votes	%
Republican	Debbie Clary (incumbent)	8,888	62.19%
Democratic	Jim Long	5,404	37.81%
Total votes		14,294	100%
Republican hold			

=== 2004 ===
North Carolina House of Representatives 110th district Democratic primary election, 2004
Party	Candidate	Votes	%
Democratic	Jim Long	1,136	61.51%
Democratic	Glenda Payne Eudy	711	38.49%
Total votes		1,847	100%

North Carolina House of Representatives 110th district Republican primary election, 2004
Party	Candidate	Votes	%
Republican	Debbie Clary (incumbent)	1,366	63.80%
Republican	Floyd Wright	775	36.20%
Total votes		2,141	100%

North Carolina House of Representatives 110th district general election, 2004
Party	Candidate	Votes	%
Republican	Debbie Clary (incumbent)	14,690	63.49%
Democratic	Jim Long	8,448	36.51%
Total votes		23,138	100%
Republican hold			

=== 2002 ===
North Carolina House of Representatives 110th district Republican primary election, 2002
Party	Candidate	Votes	%
Republican	Debbie Clary (incumbent)	1,929	68.45%
Republican	Joe D. Carpenter	889	31.55%
Total votes		2,818	100%

North Carolina House of Representatives 110th district general election, 2002
Party	Candidate	Votes	%
Republican	Debbie Clary (incumbent)	11,402	100%
Total votes		11,402	100%
Republican hold			
