= North Carolina's 48th House district =

American legislative district

North Carolina's 48th State House of Representatives district
Representative
Garland Pierce; D–Wagram
- Demographics: 38% White; 34% Black; 11% Hispanic; 1% Asian; 8% Native American; 1% Other; 6% Multiracial
- Population (2024): 87,425

North Carolina's 48th House district is one of 120 districts in the North Carolina House of Representatives. It has been represented by Democrat Garland Pierce since 2005.

== Geography ==
Since 2019, the district has included all of Hoke and Scotland counties. The district overlaps with the 24th Senate district.

== District officeholders ==
=== Multi-member district ===
Representative	Party	Dates	Notes	Representative	Party	Dates	Notes	Representative	Party	Dates	Notes	Counties
District created January 1, 1983.
Edith Ledford Lutz (Lawndale)	Democratic	January 1, 1983 – January 1, 1995	Redistricted from the 40th district.	John Jackson Hunt (Lattimore)	Democratic	January 1, 1983 – January 1, 1997	Redistricted from the 40th district.	Charles Donald Owens (Forest City)	Democratic	January 1, 1983 – January 1, 1989		1983–1993; All of Polk, Rutherford, and Cleveland counties.
Edith Ledford Lutz (Lawndale)	Democratic	January 1, 1983 – January 1, 1995	Redistricted from the 40th district.	John Jackson Hunt (Lattimore)	Democratic	January 1, 1983 – January 1, 1997	Redistricted from the 40th district.	John Weatherly (Kings Mountain)	Republican	January 1, 1989 – January 1, 1991		1983–1993; All of Polk, Rutherford, and Cleveland counties.
Edith Ledford Lutz (Lawndale)	Democratic	January 1, 1983 – January 1, 1995	Redistricted from the 40th district.	John Jackson Hunt (Lattimore)	Democratic	January 1, 1983 – January 1, 1997	Redistricted from the 40th district.	William Withrow (Ellenboro)	Democratic	January 1, 1991 – January 1, 1993		1983–1993; All of Polk, Rutherford, and Cleveland counties.
Edith Ledford Lutz (Lawndale)	Democratic	January 1, 1983 – January 1, 1995	Redistricted from the 40th district.	John Jackson Hunt (Lattimore)	Democratic	January 1, 1983 – January 1, 1997	Redistricted from the 40th district.	John Weatherly (Kings Mountain)	Republican	January 1, 1993 – January 1, 1999	Lost re-election	1993–2003; All of Rutherford and Cleveland counties. Parts of Polk and Gaston counties.
Debbie Clary (Cherryville)	Republican	January 1, 1995 – January 1, 2003	Redistricted to the 110th district.	John Jackson Hunt (Lattimore)	Democratic	January 1, 1983 – January 1, 1997	Redistricted from the 40th district.	John Weatherly (Kings Mountain)	Republican	January 1, 1993 – January 1, 1999	Lost re-election	1993–2003; All of Rutherford and Cleveland counties. Parts of Polk and Gaston counties.
Debbie Clary (Cherryville)	Republican	January 1, 1995 – January 1, 2003	Redistricted to the 110th district.	Andy Dedmon (Earl)	Democratic	January 1, 1997 – January 1, 2003	Redistricted to the 111th district and lost re-election.	John Weatherly (Kings Mountain)	Republican	January 1, 1993 – January 1, 1999	Lost re-election	1993–2003; All of Rutherford and Cleveland counties. Parts of Polk and Gaston counties.
Debbie Clary (Cherryville)	Republican	January 1, 1995 – January 1, 2003	Redistricted to the 110th district.	Andy Dedmon (Earl)	Democratic	January 1, 1997 – January 1, 2003	Redistricted to the 111th district and lost re-election.	Jim Horn (Shelby)	Democratic	January 1, 1999 – January 1, 2001	Lost re-election.	1993–2003; All of Rutherford and Cleveland counties. Parts of Polk and Gaston counties.
Debbie Clary (Cherryville)	Republican	January 1, 1995 – January 1, 2003	Redistricted to the 110th district.	Andy Dedmon (Earl)	Democratic	January 1, 1997 – January 1, 2003	Redistricted to the 111th district and lost re-election.	John Weatherly (Kings Mountain)	Republican	January 1, 2001 – January 1, 2003	Redistricted to the 110th district and retired to run for State Senate.	1993–2003; All of Rutherford and Cleveland counties. Parts of Polk and Gaston counties.

=== Single-member district ===
Representative	Party	Dates	Notes	Counties
Donald Bonner (Rowland)	Democratic	January 1, 2003 – January 1, 2005	Redistricted from the 87th district Retired.	2003–2013; Parts of Hoke, Scotland, and Robeson counties.
Garland Pierce (Wagram)	Democratic	January 1, 2005 – Present		2003–2013; Parts of Hoke, Scotland, and Robeson counties.
Garland Pierce (Wagram)	Democratic	January 1, 2005 – Present		2013–2019; Parts of Richmond, Hoke, Scotland, and Robeson counties.
Garland Pierce (Wagram)	Democratic	January 1, 2005 – Present		2019–Present; All of Hoke and Scotland counties.

== Election results ==
=== 2026 ===
North Carolina House of Representatives 48th district Republican primary election, 2026
Party	Candidate	Votes	%
Republican	Ralph Carter	2,105	59.33%
Republican	Kirk Lowery	1,443	40.67%
Total votes		3,548	100%

North Carolina House of Representatives 48th district general election, 2026
Party	Candidate	Votes	%
Democratic	Garland Pierce (incumbent)		
Republican	Ralph Carter		
Total votes			100%

=== 2024 ===
North Carolina House of Representatives 48th district Republican primary election, 2024
Party	Candidate	Votes	%
Republican	Ralph Carter	2,262	53.86%
Republican	Melissa Swarbrick	1,563	37.21%
Republican	James Diaz	375	8.93%
Total votes		4,200	100%

North Carolina House of Representatives 48th district general election, 2024
Party	Candidate	Votes	%
Democratic	Garland Pierce (incumbent)	18,845	51.92%
Republican	Ralph Carter	17,453	48.08%
Total votes		36,298	100%
Democratic hold			

=== 2022 ===
North Carolina House of Representatives 48th district general election, 2022
Party	Candidate	Votes	%
Democratic	Garland Pierce (incumbent)	12,073	53.52%
Republican	Melissa Swarbrick	10,486	46.48%
Total votes		22,559	100%
Democratic hold			

=== 2020 ===
North Carolina House of Representatives 48th district general election, 2020
Party	Candidate	Votes	%
Democratic	Garland Pierce (incumbent)	19,674	55.93%
Republican	Johnny H. Boyles	15,504	44.07%
Total votes		35,178	100%
Democratic hold			

=== 2018 ===
North Carolina House of Representatives 48th district Republican primary election, 2018
Party	Candidate	Votes	%
Republican	Russell Walker	824	64.83%
Republican	John W. Imbaratto	447	35.17%
Total votes		1,271	100%

North Carolina House of Representatives 48th district general election, 2018
Party	Candidate	Votes	%
Democratic	Garland Pierce (incumbent)	14,619	62.85%
Republican	Russell Walker	8,641	37.15%
Total votes		23,260	100%
Democratic hold			

=== 2016 ===
North Carolina House of Representatives 48th district general election, 2016
Party	Candidate	Votes	%
Democratic	Garland Pierce (incumbent)	24,076	100%
Total votes		24,076	100%
Democratic hold			

=== 2014 ===
North Carolina House of Representatives 48th district general election, 2014
Party	Candidate	Votes	%
Democratic	Garland Pierce (incumbent)	16,119	100%
Total votes		16,119	100%
Democratic hold			

=== 2012 ===
North Carolina House of Representatives 48th district general election, 2012
Party	Candidate	Votes	%
Democratic	Garland Pierce (incumbent)	27,193	100%
Total votes		27,193	100%
Democratic hold			

=== 2010 ===
North Carolina House of Representatives 48th district general election, 2010
Party	Candidate	Votes	%
Democratic	Garland Pierce (incumbent)	9,698	74.80%
Republican	John F. Harry	3,267	25.20%
Total votes		12,965	100%
Democratic hold			

=== 2008 ===
North Carolina House of Representatives 48th district general election, 2008
Party	Candidate	Votes	%
Democratic	Garland Pierce (incumbent)	20,362	100%
Total votes		20,362	100%
Democratic hold			

=== 2006 ===
North Carolina House of Representatives 48th district general election, 2006
Party	Candidate	Votes	%
Democratic	Garland Pierce (incumbent)	8,714	100%
Total votes		8,714	100%
Democratic hold			

=== 2004 ===
North Carolina House of Representatives 48th district Democratic primary election, 2004
Party	Candidate	Votes	%
Democratic	Garland Pierce	2,683	40.88%
Democratic	J.D. Willis	2,559	38.99%
Democratic	Russell C. Smith	1,321	20.13%
Total votes		6,563	100%

North Carolina House of Representatives 48th district general election, 2004
Party	Candidate	Votes	%
Democratic	Garland Pierce	15,924	100%
Total votes		15,924	100%
Democratic hold			

=== 2002 ===
North Carolina House of Representatives 48th district general election, 2002
Party	Candidate	Votes	%
Democratic	Donald Bonner (incumbent)	9,968	100%
Total votes		9,968	100%
Democratic hold			

=== 2000 ===
North Carolina House of Representatives 48th district general election, 2000
Party	Candidate	Votes	%
Republican	Debbie Clary (incumbent)	35,545	19.71%
Democratic	Andy Dedmon (incumbent)	32,641	18.10%
Republican	John Weatherly	31,200	17.30%
Democratic	Jim Horn (incumbent)	28,952	16.06%
Republican	Dennis H. Davis	27,563	15.29%
Democratic	Connie Goforth-Greene	24,420	13.54%
Total votes		180,321	100%
Republican hold			
Democratic hold			
Republican gain from Democratic			
