= Garland E. Pierce =

American politician

Garland Pierce
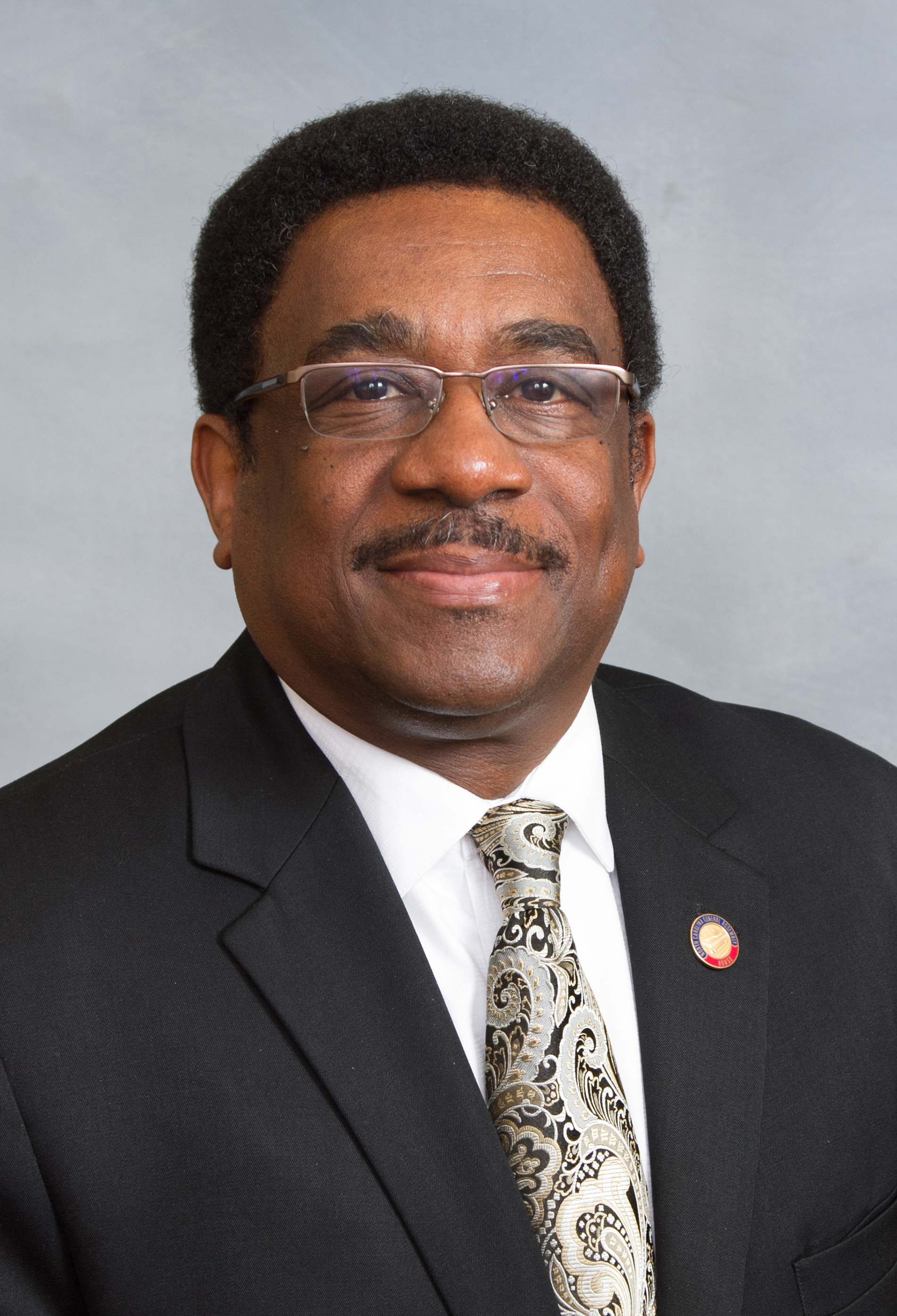

Member of the North Carolina House of Representatives from the 48th district
- Incumbent
- Assumed office January 1, 2005
- Preceded by: Donald Bonner

Personal details
- Born: Garland Edward Pierce; July 9, 1953 (age 73) Fayetteville, North Carolina, U.S.
- Party: Democratic
- Spouse: Barbara
- Children: 2
- Education: Fayetteville State University (BS); Shaw University (MDiv)
- Occupation: Minister

Garland Edward Pierce (born July 9, 1953) is a Democratic member of the North Carolina House of Representatives, who has represented the state's 48th district (including constituents in Hoke and Scotland counties) since 2005. Pierce is African-American. During the 2016 legislative session, Pierce was one of 11 Democrats to vote in favor of House Bill 2, the controversial "Bathroom Bill". He was reelected in 2020.

== Committee assignments ==
=== 2021–2022 session ===
- Appropriations
- Appropriations - Justice and Public Safety
- Commerce (Vice Chair)
- Health
- Homeland Security, Military, and Veterans Affairs
- Insurance
- Energy and Public Utilities

=== 2019–2020 session ===
- Appropriations
- Appropriations - Justice and Public Safety
- Commerce
- Health
- Homeland Security, Military, and Veterans Affairs
- Insurance

=== 2017–2018 session ===
- Appropriations
- Appropriations - General Government
- Commerce and Job Development
- Homeland Security, Military, and Veterans Affairs (Vice Chair)
- Insurance
- Banking
- Homelessness, Foster Care, and Dependency

=== 2015–2016 session ===
- Appropriations
- Appropriations - Agriculture and Natural and Economic Resources (Vice-Chair)
- Commerce and Job Development
- Homeland Security, Military, and Veterans Affairs (Vice-Chair)
- Insurance
- Banking
- Children, Youth and Families

=== 2013–2014 session ===
- Appropriations
- Commerce and Job Development
- Health and Human Services
- Insurance
- Public Utilities

=== 2011–2012 session ===
- Appropriations
- Commerce and Job Development
- Health and Human Services
- Insurance
- Public Utilities

=== 2009–2010 session ===
- Appropriations
- Commerce, Small Business, and Entrepreneurship
- Insurance
- Aging
- Federal Relations and Indian Affairs
- Juvenile Justice

== Electoral history ==
=== 2024 ===
North Carolina House of Representatives 48th district general election, 2024
Party	Candidate	Votes	%
Democratic	Garland Pierce (incumbent)	18,845	51.92%
Republican	Ralph Carter	17,453	48.08%
Total votes		36,298	100%
Democratic hold			

=== 2022 ===
North Carolina House of Representatives 48th district general election, 2022
Party	Candidate	Votes	%
Democratic	Garland Pierce (incumbent)	12,073	53.52%
Republican	Melissa Swarbrick	10,486	46.48%
Total votes		22,559	100%
Democratic hold			

=== 2020 ===
North Carolina House of Representatives 48th district general election, 2020
Party	Candidate	Votes	%
Democratic	Garland Pierce (incumbent)	19,674	55.93%
Republican	Johnny H. Boyles	15,504	44.07%
Total votes		35,178	100%
Democratic hold			

=== 2018 ===
North Carolina House of Representatives 48th district general election, 2018
Party	Candidate	Votes	%
Democratic	Garland Pierce (incumbent)	14,619	62.85%
Republican	Russell Walker	8,641	37.15%
Total votes		23,260	100%
Democratic hold			

=== 2016 ===
North Carolina House of Representatives 48th district general election, 2016
Party	Candidate	Votes	%
Democratic	Garland Pierce (incumbent)	24,076	100%
Total votes		24,076	100%
Democratic hold			

=== 2014 ===
North Carolina House of Representatives 48th district general election, 2014
Party	Candidate	Votes	%
Democratic	Garland Pierce (incumbent)	16,119	100%
Total votes		16,119	100%
Democratic hold			

=== 2012 ===
North Carolina House of Representatives 48th district general election, 2012
Party	Candidate	Votes	%
Democratic	Garland Pierce (incumbent)	27,193	100%
Total votes		27,193	100%
Democratic hold			

=== 2010 ===
North Carolina House of Representatives 48th district general election, 2010
Party	Candidate	Votes	%
Democratic	Garland Pierce (incumbent)	9,698	74.80%
Republican	John F. Harry	3,267	25.20%
Total votes		12,965	100%
Democratic hold			

=== 2008 ===
North Carolina House of Representatives 48th district general election, 2008
Party	Candidate	Votes	%
Democratic	Garland Pierce (incumbent)	20,362	100%
Total votes		20,362	100%
Democratic hold			

=== 2006 ===
North Carolina House of Representatives 48th district general election, 2006
Party	Candidate	Votes	%
Democratic	Garland Pierce (incumbent)	8,714	100%
Total votes		8,714	100%
Democratic hold			

=== 2004 ===
North Carolina House of Representatives 48th district Democratic primary election, 2004
Party	Candidate	Votes	%
Democratic	Garland Pierce	2,683	40.88%
Democratic	J.D. Willis	2,559	38.99%
Democratic	Russell C. Smith	1,321	20.13%
Total votes		6,563	100%

North Carolina House of Representatives 48th district general election, 2004
Party	Candidate	Votes	%
Democratic	Garland Pierce	15,924	100%
Total votes		15,924	100%
Democratic hold			

North Carolina House of Representatives
Preceded by Donald Bonner	Member of the North Carolina House of Representatives from the 48th district 2005–present	Incumbent
