= Walter Dalton =

33rd Lieutenant Governor of North Carolina

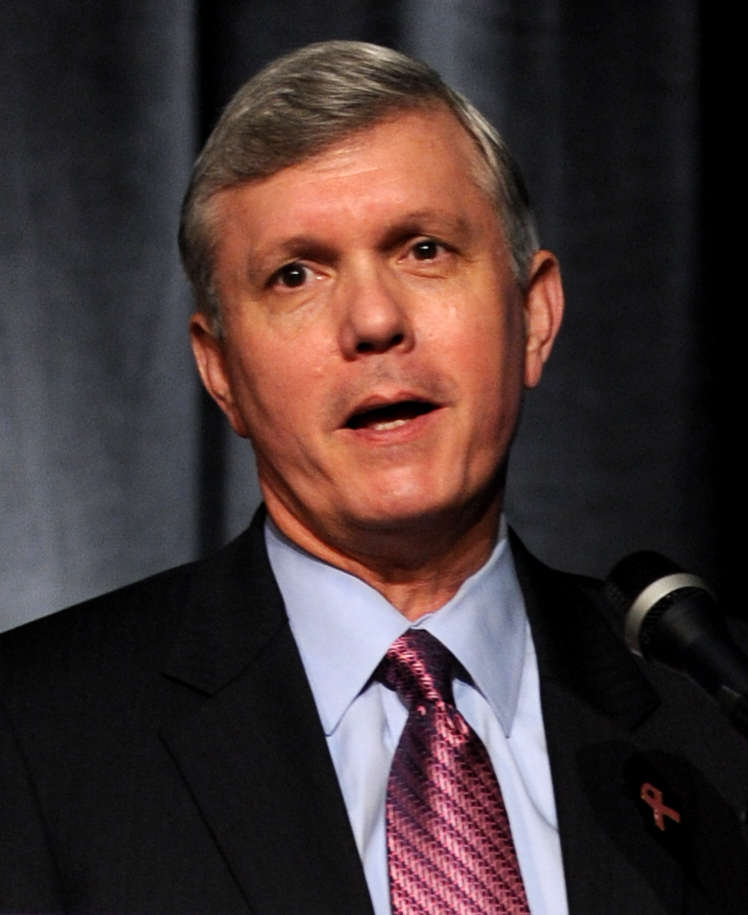

33rd Lieutenant Governor of North Carolina
- In office January 10, 2009 – January 7, 2013
- Governor: Bev Perdue
- Preceded by: Bev Perdue
- Succeeded by: Dan Forest

Member of the North Carolina Senate
- In office January 1, 1997 – January 1, 2009
- Preceded by: Dennis Davis
- Succeeded by: Debbie Clary
- Constituency: 37th district (1997–2003); 46th district (2003–2009)

Personal details
- Born: May 21, 1949 (age 77) Rutherfordton, North Carolina, U.S.
- Party: Democratic
- Spouse: Lucille Dalton
- Children: 2
- Education: University of North Carolina at Chapel Hill (BS, JD)

Walter H. Dalton (born May 21, 1949) is an American attorney and politician who served as the 33rd lieutenant governor of North Carolina. A member of the Democratic Party, he served six terms in the state senate before his election to the office of lieutenant governor in 2008.

Dalton was the Democratic nominee for Governor of North Carolina in 2012. He lost the general election to former Charlotte Mayor Pat McCrory.

In 2013, he was named president of Isothermal Community College located in Rutherford County, North Carolina. He served as the college's president until his retirement in 2021.

== Early life, education, and law career ==
Dalton was born in Rutherfordton, Rutherford County, North Carolina to Charles Dalton, a former state senator, and Amanda Dalton, a schoolteacher. He earned a B.S. in Business Administration from the University of North Carolina at Chapel Hill in 1971, and earned a J.D. from the University of North Carolina at Chapel Hill School of Law in 1975.

Dalton worked in the Audit Department of Union Trust Company between 1971 and 1972. He clerked for Woodrow W. Jones, Chief Judge of the United States District Court for the Western District of North Carolina, between 1975 and 1977. He worked for many years as an attorney based in Rutherfordton, North Carolina. He joined the law firm of Hamrick, Bowen, Nanney & Dalton, LLP in 1977 and left in 2000.

== North Carolina Senate (1997–2009) ==
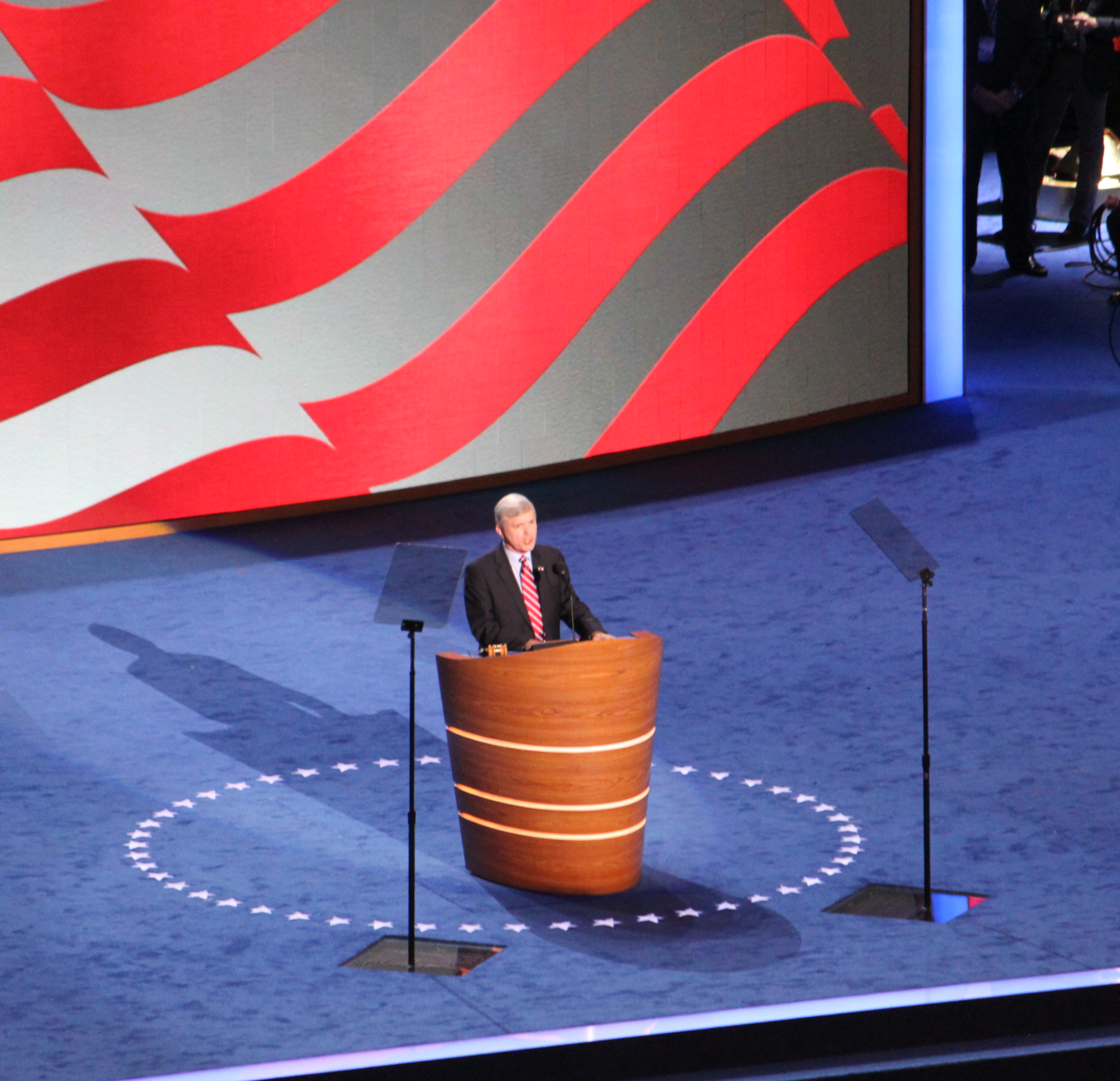
Dalton speaking at the 2012 Democratic National Convention

=== Elections ===
Dalton represented constituents in Cleveland and Rutherford counties in the North Carolina General Assembly. His district was originally the 37th Senate district, but it was renumbered as the 46th in the redistricting following the 2000 United States census.

Dalton's legislative career began in 1996 when he challenged freshman incumbent Republican state senator Dennis Davis. The general election was close, with Dalton being declared the winner by a margin of 50.38%–49.62%, after a recount. Davis tried to win back the seat in 1998, but Dalton won by a larger margin, 54.86%–45.14%. In 2000, he defeated Scott Neisler, 55%–45%. In 2002, he defeated Republican nominee John Weatherly, 52%–45%. In 2004, he defeated Republican nominee Jim Testa, 53%–47%. In 2006, he defeated Republican nominee Wes Westmoreland, 54%–46%.

=== Tenure ===
In the State Senate, Dalton served as co-chair of the Senate Education Committee and co-chair of the Senate Appropriations Committee.

During his time as a state senator, Dalton focused on improving education. Dalton worked to increase teacher pay while also reducing class sizes. In 2003, Dalton sponsored the Innovative Education Initiatives Act, establishing North Carolina's award-winning network of Early College High Schools. The Early Colleges are a system of high schools partnered with institutions of higher learning that allow students to graduate with both a high school diploma and either an associate degree or college credit in five years. He also supported increasing funding for the state's public university and community college systems during his tenure.

As a state senator, Dalton developed a reputation as a pro-business Democrat. He promoted incentives to help attract new businesses to North Carolina and relief to small business owners.

In 2006, Dalton helped establish Chimney Rock State Park.

=== Committee assignments ===
- Senate Education Committee (Co-chairman)
- Senate Appropriations Committee (Co-chairman)

== Lieutenant Governor (2009–2013) ==
=== Election ===
In 2007, Dalton announced that he would seek the Democratic nomination for Lieutenant Governor of North Carolina in 2008. He won the Democratic primary on May 6, 2008, defeating Hampton Dellinger, Patrick Smathers, and Dan Besse. He won the general election on November 4, 2008, against the Republican nominee, former state senator Robert Pittenger.

=== Tenure ===
Dalton was sworn in on January 10, 2009. He served as the chairman of the Joining Our Businesses and Schools (JOBS) Commission. The commission included 20 business and education leaders. Through his work on the JOBS Commission, Dalton led a bipartisan effort to strengthen the relationship between private businesses and schools to help improve job training.

Dalton was appointed Chairman of the North Carolina Logistics Task Force in December 2009.

Dalton helped establish a small business assistance fund to help businesses across the state secure the credit necessary to expand and create jobs.

== 2012 gubernatorial election ==
After first-term Governor Beverly Perdue announced that she would not seek a second term in 2012, Dalton announced that he would be a candidate for governor. Ahead of the May 8 Democratic primary, Dalton was endorsed by The Charlotte Observer, which described him as "well-versed in both the legislative and executive branches and in the crucial issues facing the state" and as "battle-tested," making him the strongest general election candidate. The Winston-Salem Journal also endorsed Dalton, writing that he had "considerable success as a legislator and played a major role in launching North Carolina's successful Early College program." Dalton won the May 8 primary, defeating former U.S. Congressman Bob Etheridge and State Representative Bill Faison 46%–38%–6%.

During the general election, polls gave McCrory anywhere from a two to 14-point advantage. Rasmussen Reports released a poll August 4 showing Dalton trailing McCrory by 5 points. In first quarter campaign finance reports, Dalton reported raising about $1 million less than McCrory's campaign. Dalton also reported having $670,356.14 cash on hand at the end of the reporting period on April 21. McCrory reported having $3.1 million.

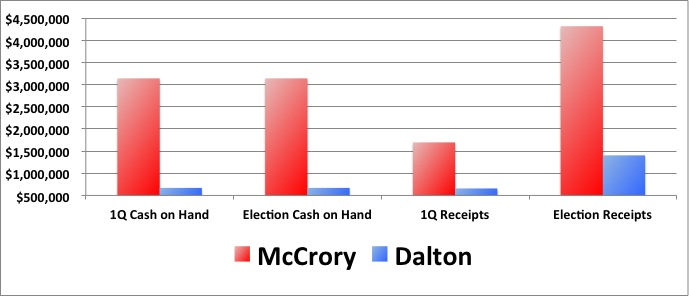
First Quarter 2012 Fundraising results reported the NC Board of Elections

In October 2012, the (Raleigh) News and Observer endorsed Dalton for the general election, writing that "on the merits of experience, knowledge, vision and judgment, [Dalton] is extraordinarily well equipped to give North Carolina the executive leadership it needs." In 2008, the newspaper had endorsed McCrory.

=== Results ===
North Carolina gubernatorial election, 2012
Party	Candidate	Votes	%	±%
Republican	Pat McCrory	2,447,988	54.70%	+7.82%
Democratic	Walter H. Dalton	1,931,750	43.17%	−7.10%
Libertarian	Barbara Howe	95,154	2.13%	−0.72%
Margin of victory		516,238	11.54%	+8.14%
Turnout		4,474,892	67.30%	−0.84%
Republican gain from Democratic		Swing		

== Career after politics ==
Following the end of his term as lieutenant governor, Dalton was hired by Gardner-Webb University to teach a class on Southern politics and to serve as a special counsel to the university's president. Several months later, he was selected as president of Isothermal Community College, where he had once served as board of trustees chairman.

== Personal life ==
Dalton's father, Charles, was also a North Carolina state senator, who died when Walter was 8 years old. His elder sister, Laura, helped their mother, Amanda, raise young Walter. She later became active in Republican politics and married Charles Neely, a Republican who served in the state legislature and unsuccessfully ran for governor in 2000.

Dalton's wife, Lucille, is a former teacher and former local school board member. Walter and Lucille Dalton are the parents of two children, Brian and Elizabeth.

North Carolina Senate
Preceded by Dennis Davis	Member of the North Carolina Senate from the 37th district 1997–2003	Succeeded by Dan Clodfelter
Preceded by Constituency established	Member of the North Carolina Senate from the 46th district 2003–2009	Succeeded by Debbie Clary
Party political offices
Preceded by Bev Perdue	Democratic nominee for Lieutenant Governor of North Carolina; 2008	Succeeded by Linda Coleman
Preceded by Bev Perdue	Democratic nominee for Governor of North Carolina; 2012	Succeeded by Roy Cooper
Political offices
Preceded by Bev Perdue	Lieutenant Governor of North Carolina; 2009–2013	Succeeded by Dan Forest
