= Harvey D. Williams =

African-American U.S. Army major general (1930–2020)

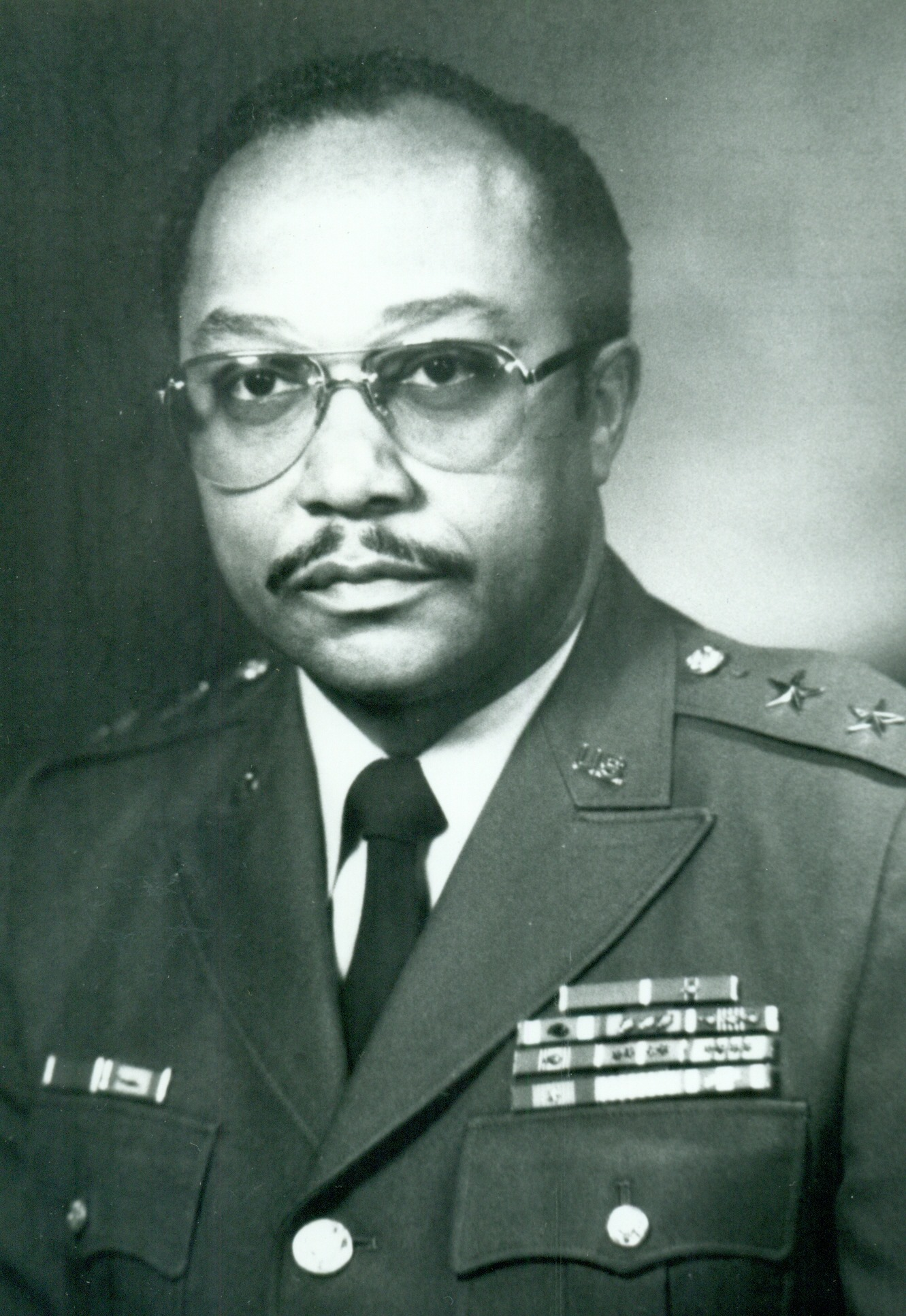
- Born: Harvey Dean Williams; July 30, 1930; Whiteville, North Carolina, U.S.
- Died: August 7, 2020 (aged 90); Germantown, Maryland, U.S.
- Education: West Virginia State College (BA); George Washington University (MS)
- Military career
- Allegiance: United States of America
- Branch: United States Army
- Service years: 1951–1982
- Rank: Major General
- Conflicts: Korean War; Vietnam War
- Awards: Legion of Merit; Bronze Star (2); Meritorious Service Medal (2); Air Medal (5); Army Commendation Medal (5)

Harvey Dean Williams Sr. (July 30, 1930 – August 7, 2020) was a United States Army major general. He was the first African-American post commander of Fort Myer, and was the Deputy Inspector General of the U.S. Army in 1980. He commanded artillery units in the Korean War and Vietnam War and his 1978 activism after facing discrimination as an African-American soldier in Augsburg, West Germany made international news.

== Early life ==
Harvey Dean Williams was born on July 30, 1930, in Whiteville, North Carolina, the son of Matthew Dean Williams and Addie Haynes Williams. He grew up in Durham, North Carolina, and attended Hillside High School (graduating in the class of 1946).

He received a Bachelor of Arts in political science from West Virginia State College (now West Virginia State University) and a Master of Science in International Relations from George Washington University.

== Career ==
=== Early career, Korean and Vietnam Wars, and Fort Myer (1951–1977) ===
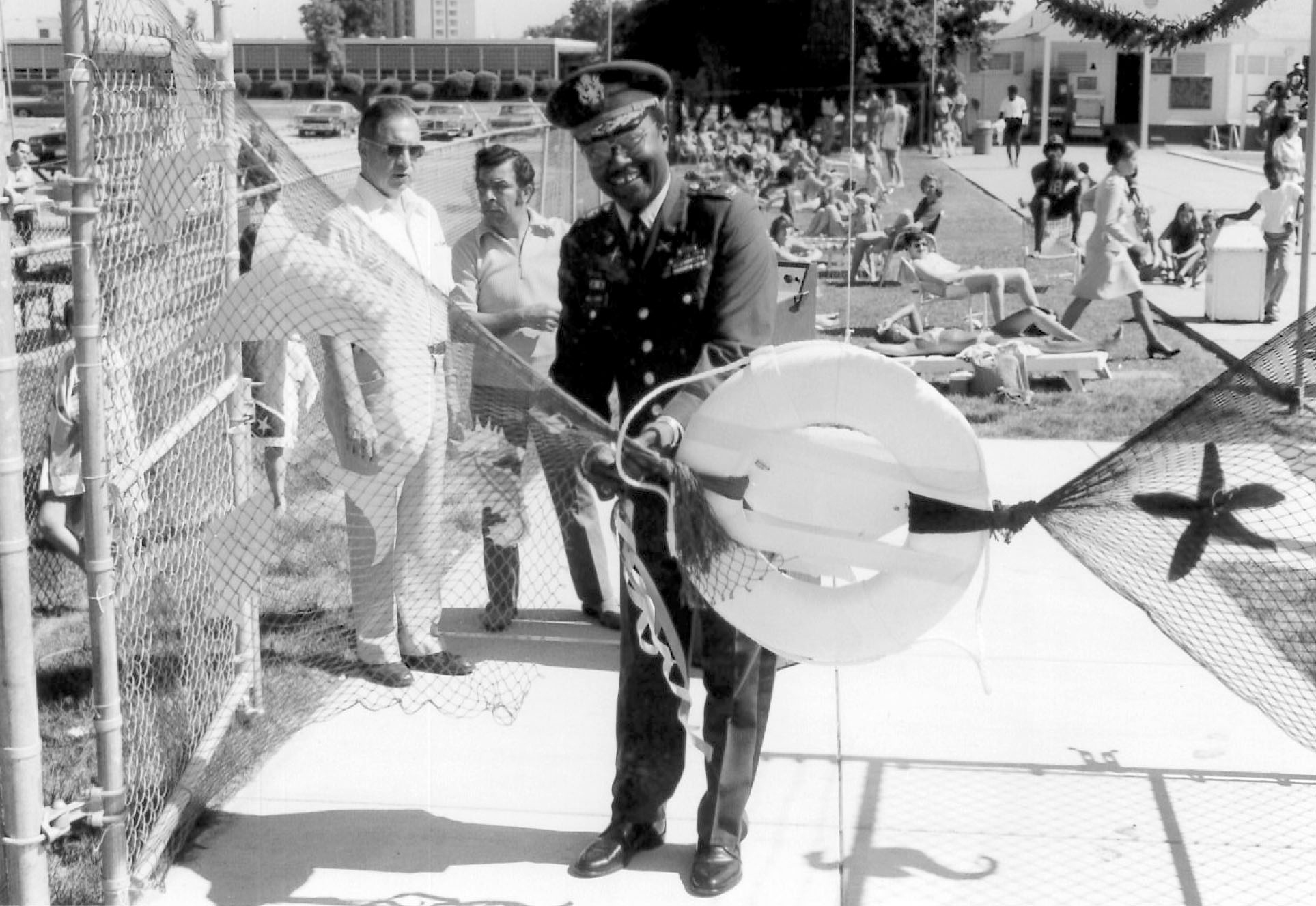
Williams at a swimming pool ribbon-cutting ceremony, as Fort Myer post commander, 1975–1977

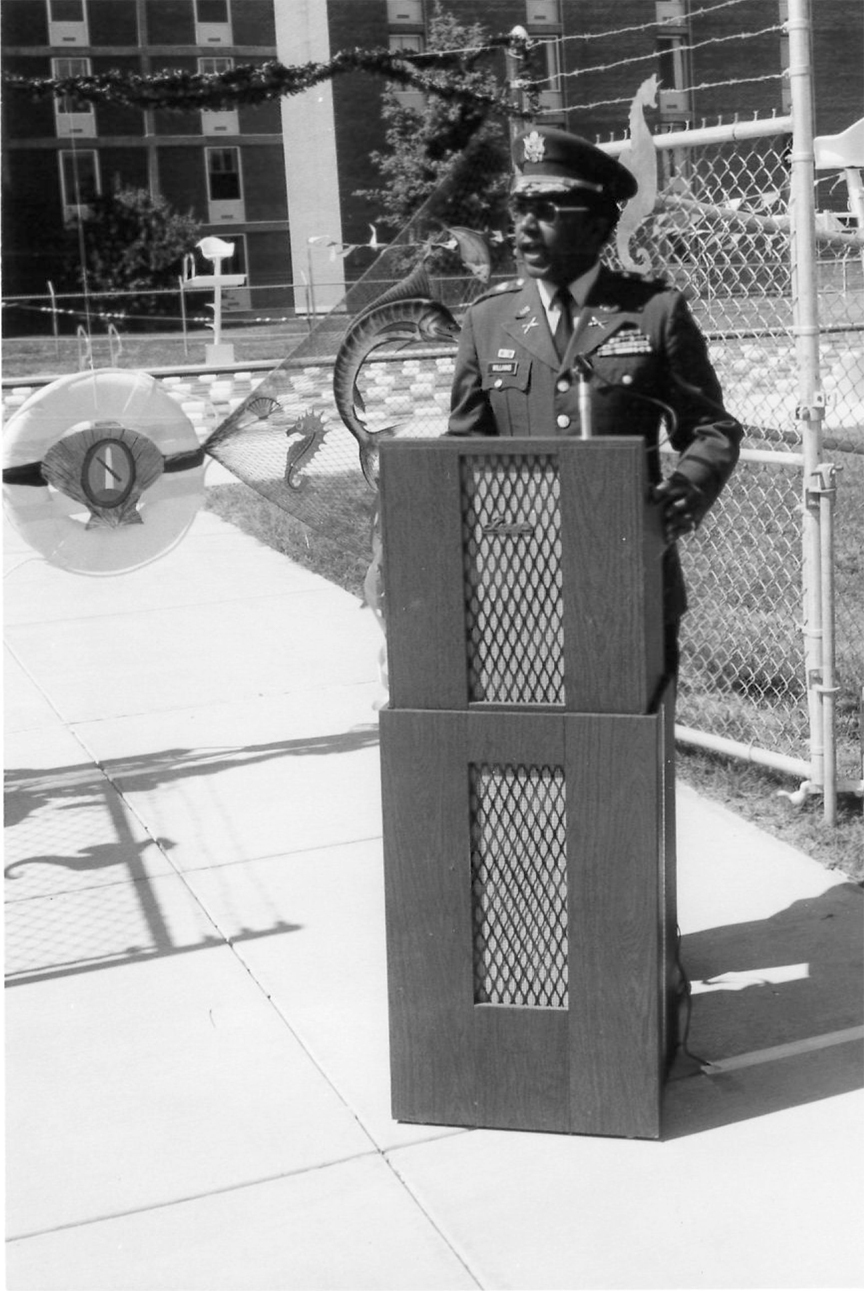
Williams as Fort Myer post commander, 1975–1977

Williams graduated from the Army ROTC at West Virginia State College in 1950 (shortly after the college established its ROTC program in 1942). Williams was one of the first of 15 graduates of West Virginia State University to become general officers. He entered active duty in the United States Army in 1951, as a second lieutenant.

He was a commander of a Battery in the Korean War, and he served two tours in Korea (the first in 1953–1954).

As an Army officer, then-Captain Williams served as a member of the military staff and faculty (within the Artillery department) at Cornell University from 1957 to 1959, an early pioneer of black Army officers becoming instructors at Ivy League universities. Williams was a major by 1965.

Williams was assigned to Vietnam during the Vietnam War in August 1969, first serving as Assistant G-4 (later Deputy G-4) of I Field Force. From January 1970 to June 1970, he was the commander of the 1st Battalion, 92nd Artillery, I Field Force in Vietnam. He was promoted from lieutenant colonel to colonel on October 14, 1971.

Williams went on to attend the Naval War College in Newport, Rhode Island, cited as being the first black Army officer selected to attend the Naval War College's senior course. In June 1973, Williams became the commander of the 75th Field Artillery Group at Fort Sill, Oklahoma.

On June 16, 1975, then-Colonel Williams became the first African-American commander of Fort Myer, a U.S. Army post next to Arlington National Cemetery in Arlington County, Virginia (now part of the Joint Base Myer–Henderson Hall). He was the post commander of Fort Myer from 1975 to 1977.

Williams was promoted from colonel to brigadier general on September 2, 1977. According to Ebony in May 1978, Williams was one of 14 currently-serving black United States Army generals at the time.

=== Augsburg incident and activism against discrimination (1978) ===
In the late 1970s, Williams was the commanding general of VII Corps Artillery — the commander of a community of 15,000 American soldiers in Europe stationed at Augsburg, West Germany.

In 1978, while stationed in Augsburg, then-Brigadier General Williams and other American soldiers—especially other African-Americans—faced discrimination. Earlier that year, Williams was barred from entering a German discotheque despite meeting the building's dress code and guidelines, until another mentioned Williams' rank.

Williams went on to speak out about this incident in interviews, including an interview with the Associated Press that same year, and advocated for German businesses and restaurants to stop barring American soldiers and GIs (especially people of color) from entering. This incident—and Williams' activism—made headlines internationally, reported on in magazines like Jet, and in cities across the United States, West Germany, and Portugal. The incident led Augsburg mayor Hans Breuer to change and amend policies to end these practices of discrimination in the treatment of American GIs.

=== Later career and positions ===
In 1978, Williams was appointed as Deputy Commanding General of the U.S. Army Military District of Washington, becoming Chief of Staff of the United States Army Military District of Washington the previous February.

In 1980, Williams became the Deputy Inspector General of the United States Army. Williams was also the Assistant Chief of Staff for Intelligence as Chief of the Security Division for the United States Department of the Army.

Williams retired from military duty in 1982, as a major general. After retiring from military duty, Williams later went on to work for various information technology companies, including a non-profit organization bringing technology to diverse communities.

== Awards and recognition ==
Williams was among the first inducted into the West Virginia State College ROTC Hall of Fame in 1980.

Williams was a recipient of the Legion of Merit. He was also a recipient of the Bronze Star Medal with one oak leaf cluster (first received 1953/54), the Meritorious Service Medal with one oak leaf cluster, the Air Medal with four oak leaf clusters, and the Army Commendation Medal with four oak leaf clusters (first received in 1965).

Williams was awarded the Gallantry Cross with silver star by the government of South Vietnam.

On August 31, 1996, Williams was awarded the Order of the Long Leaf Pine, an honor given for extraordinary service to the state of North Carolina, by Governor James B. Hunt Jr.

== Personal life ==
Harvey Williams and his wife, Mary, were married for 64 years, from 1956 to his death in 2020. The couple resided in Germantown, Maryland, and they had five adult children and two grandchildren. Williams died at the age of 90, at home in Maryland on August 7, 2020, due to Parkinson's disease.
