= University of North Carolina Board of Governors =

University governing board

UNC Board of Governors

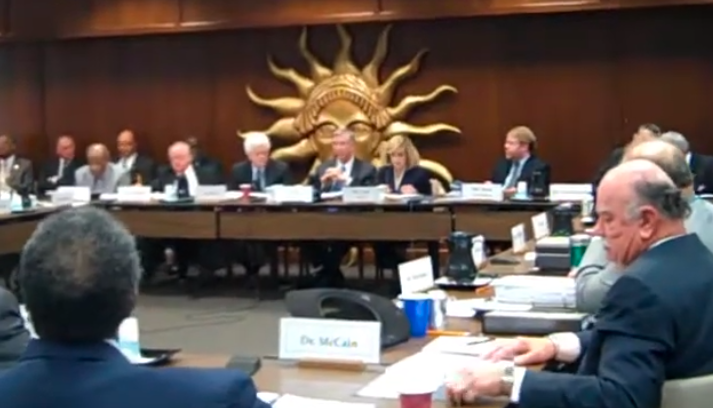
- Board meeting in February 2012

Governing board overview
- Formed: 1971
- Preceding agencies: NC Board of Trustees; NC Board of Higher Education
- Type: University system governing board
- Jurisdiction: University of North Carolina
- Headquarters: Chapel Hill, North Carolina
- Governing board executives: Wendy Floyd Murphy, Chair; Kellie Hunt Blue, Vice Chair; Pearl Burris-Floyd, Secretary
- Website: Board of Governors website

The University of North Carolina Board of Governors, known more commonly as the UNC Board of Governors, is the governing body of the University of North Carolina system. The board is composed of 24 members, selected by the state legislature.

== Overview ==
The board is charged with “the general determination, control, supervision, management, and governance” of the UNC system, a system of 17 campuses. The current form of the Board was created in 1971. One of the large roles of the board is the election of the UNC System President, currently Peter Hans.

The board must elect a chair, vice chair, and secretary from within its voting membership for two-year terms that begin on July 1 of even-numbered years. The current executives are Randall C. Ramsey serving as chair, Wendy Floyd Murphy serving as vice chair, and Pearl Burris-Floyd serving as secretary.

== History ==
The Board of Governors was created in 1971 under Governor Bob Scott, replacing a previous system that was composed of a 100 person board that managed 6 state funded universities, and a State Board of Higher Education that managed 9 other universities. This centralized the governance of all public universities in the state by creating a 32 member board of governors for the UNC System, a board of trustees and chancellor for each university.

In 2019, Governor Roy Cooper signed legislation to reduce the size of the Board of Governors to 24.

== Notable members ==
- Rob Bryan, state legislator
- Pearl Burris-Floyd, state legislator
- William G. Daughtridge Jr., NC Secretary of Administration
- N. Leo Daughtry, state legislator
- Tom Fetzer, Mayor of Raleigh
- Joel D. M. Ford, state senator
- John A. Fraley, state legislator
- Thom Goolsby, state senator
- Peter Hans, President of the UNC System
- James Holshouser, 68th Governor of North Carolina
- Rodney E. Hood, Comptroller of the Currency
- Joseph Thomas Knott, lawyer
- Betty Ray McCain, NC Secretary of Cultural Resources
- Tim Moore, U.S. Congressman
- Art Pope, state legislator and budget director
- Lee H. Roberts, Chancellor of UNC Chapel Hill
- David Rouzer, U.S. Congressman
- Benjamin S. Ruffin Jr., civil rights activist
- Elihu A. White, state legislator
- Ruth Dial Woods, educator and activist
