= Kelly Hastings =

American politician (born 1961)

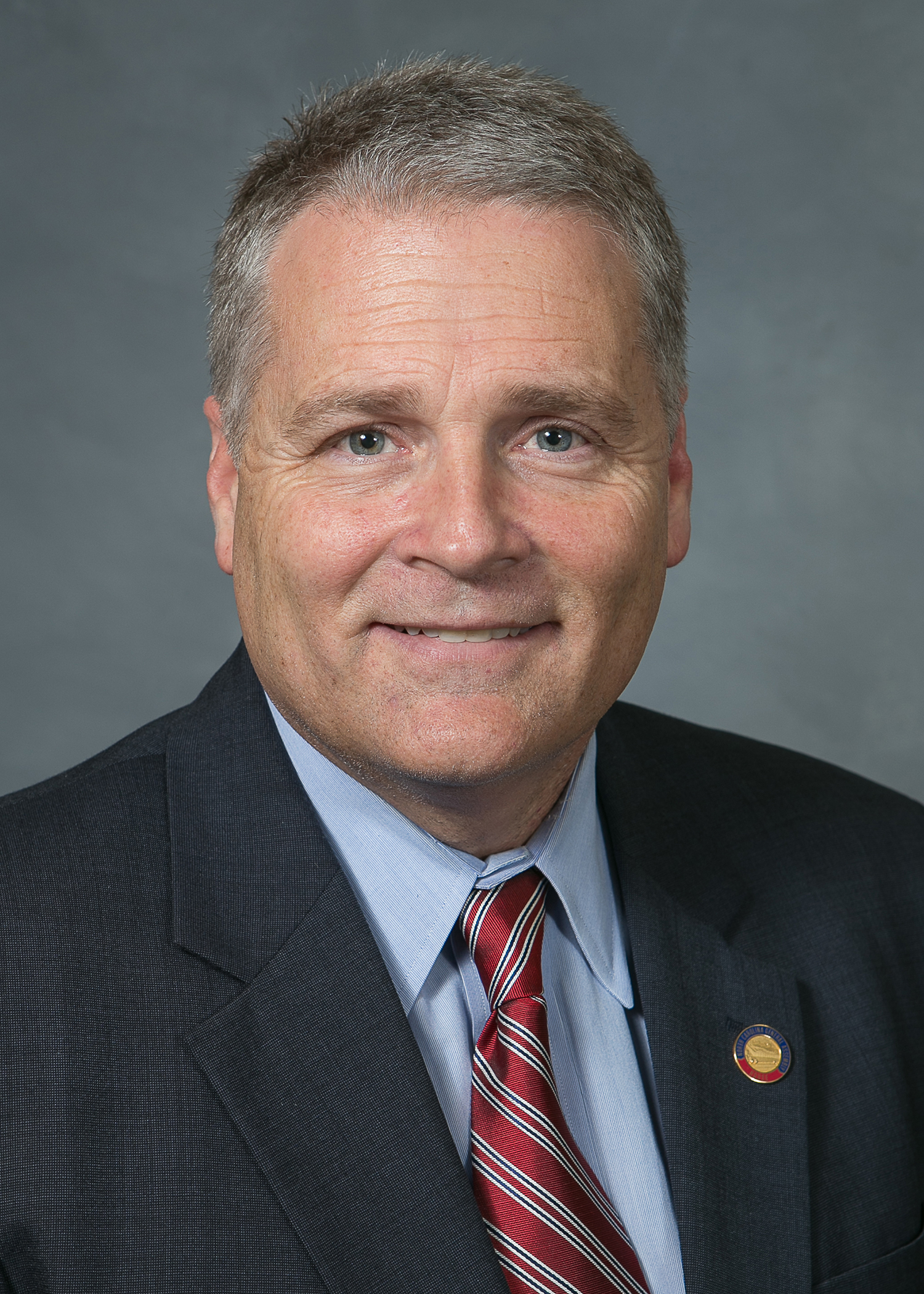
- Official portrait, 2015

Member of the North Carolina House of Representatives from the 110th district
- Incumbent
- Assumed office January 1, 2011
- Preceded by: Pearl Burris-Floyd

Personal details
- Born: Kelly Eugene Hastings; June 16, 1961 (age 65) Boone, North Carolina, U.S.
- Party: Republican
- Spouse: Anika Hastings
- Children: 1
- Education: Appalachian State University (BS)
- Occupation: Realtor, Politician

Kelly Eugene Hastings (born June 16, 1961) is a Republican member of the North Carolina House of Representatives. He has represented the 110th district (including constituents in Gaston and Cleveland counties) since 2011.

== Career ==
Hastings served in the U.S. Marine Corps and Reserve. In 1997, Hastings became a realtor. In 2010, Hastings' political career began as a Republican member of the North Carolina General Assembly for the 110th district. In 2010, Hastings was elected to his first term as a member of the North Carolina House of Representatives, representing District 110. Hastings has been re-elected to the seat a total of 7 times.

== Personal life ==
In 1986, Hastings earned a BS in communication, Marketing, Management from Appalachian State University. Hastings earned a graduate teaching certificate from University of North Carolina at Charlotte. Hastings' wife is Anika, a dentist. They have one child. Hastings resides in Cherryville, North Carolina.

== Electoral history ==
=== 2024 ===
Hastings faced Democrat Justin "JW" Matthews in the 2024 election. This marked the first time he was opposed in the general election since 2018. Hastings again won re-election. Matthews claimed to be the youngest Democratic NC House Candidate for 2024. Matthews was 24.

North Carolina House of Representatives 110th district general election, 2024
Party	Candidate	Votes	%
Republican	Kelly Hastings (incumbent)	28,418	67.57%
Democratic	Justin “JW” Matthews	14,268	33.43%
Total votes		42,686	100%
Republican hold			

=== 2022 ===
In 2022, Hastings won re-election with 20,551 votes. He ran unopposed in the primary and the general.

=== 2020 ===
North Carolina House of Representatives 110th district general election, 2020
Party	Candidate	Votes	%
Republican	Kelly Hastings (incumbent)	29,399	100%
Total votes		29,399	100%
Republican hold			

=== 2018 ===
North Carolina House of Representatives 110th district Republican primary election, 2018
Party	Candidate	Votes	%
Republican	Kelly Hastings (incumbent)	2,038	61.70%
Republican	Charlene High	1,265	38.30%
Total votes		3,303	100%

North Carolina House of Representatives 110th district general election, 2018
Party	Candidate	Votes	%
Republican	Kelly Hastings (incumbent)	16,708	67.84%
Democratic	Christy McCleary	7,919	32.16%
Total votes		24,627	100%
Republican hold			

=== 2016 ===
North Carolina House of Representatives 110th district general election, 2016
Party	Candidate	Votes	%
Republican	Kelly Hastings (incumbent)	24,931	100%
Total votes		24,931	100%
Republican hold			

=== 2014 ===
North Carolina House of Representatives 110th district general election, 2014
Party	Candidate	Votes	%
Republican	Kelly Hastings (incumbent)	14,394	100%
Total votes		14,394	100%
Republican hold			

=== 2012 ===
North Carolina House of Representatives 110th district Republican primary election, 2012
Party	Candidate	Votes	%
Republican	Kelly Hastings (incumbent)	4,948	63.99%
Republican	Pearl Burris-Floyd	2,784	36.01%
Total votes		7,732	100%

North Carolina House of Representatives 110th district general election, 2012
Party	Candidate	Votes	%
Republican	Kelly Hastings (incumbent)	20,236	63.80%
Democratic	Jamar McKoy	10,465	33.00%
Libertarian	Lewis B. Guignard, Jr.	1,015	3.20%
Total votes		31,716	100%
Republican hold			

=== 2010 ===
North Carolina House of Representatives 110th district Republican primary election, 2010
Party	Candidate	Votes	%
Republican	Kelly Hastings	1,368	52.68%
Republican	Pearl Burris-Floyd (incumbent)	1,229	47.32%
Total votes		2,597	100%

North Carolina House of Representatives 110th district general election, 2010
Party	Candidate	Votes	%
Republican	Kelly Hastings	12,433	69.82%
Democratic	John Eaker	5,373	30.18%
Total votes		17,806	100%
Republican hold			

== Committee assignments ==
=== 2021-2022 session ===
- Appropriations (Vice Chair)
- Appropriations - Capital (chair)
- UNC BOG Nominations (chair)
- Education - Universities (Vice Chair)
- Rules, Calendar, and Operations of the House (Vice Chair)
- Energy and Public Utilities
- Federal Relations and American Indian Affairs
- Redistricting

=== 2019-2020 session ===
- Appropriations (Vice Chair)
- Appropriations - Capital (chair)
- Education - Universities (chair)
- Rules, Calendar, and Operations of the House
- Energy and Public Utilities
- Redistricting

=== 2017-2018 session ===
- Finance (chair)
- Transportation (chair)
- Rules, Calendar, and Operations of the House
- Education - Universities
- Energy and Public Utilities
- Alcoholic Beverage Control
- Judiciary III

=== 2015-2016 session ===
- Finance (chair)
- UNC BOG Nominations (Vice Chair)
- Alcoholic Beverage Control (Vice Chair)
- Education - Universities
- Public Utilities
- Rules, Calendar, and Operations of the House
- Judiciary III
- Health
- Insurance

=== 2013-2014 session ===
- Appropriations
- Homeland Security, Military, and Veterans Affairs (chair)
- Rules, Calendar, and Operations of the House
- Transportation
- Insurance
- Environment

=== 2011-2012 session ===
- Appropriations
- Banking (Vice Chair)
- Public Utilities
- Environment
- Commerce and Job Development

North Carolina House of Representatives
Preceded by Pearl Burris-Floyd	Member of the North Carolina House of Representatives from the 110th district 2011-Present	Incumbent
