= Pearl Burris-Floyd =

American politician

Representative Pearl Burris-Floyd
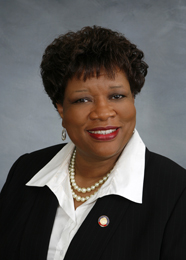

Member of the North Carolina House of Representatives from the 110th district
- In office January 1, 2009 – January 1, 2011
- Preceded by: Debbie Clary
- Succeeded by: Kelly Hastings

Personal details
- Party: Republican
- Children: 1
- Education: University of North Carolina at Chapel Hill (BS)
- Occupation: Cytologist

Pearl Burris-Floyd is an American politician who previously served in the North Carolina House of Representatives representing the 110th district (including constituents in Gaston and Cleveland counties) from 2009 until 2011. A Cytologist and former Gaston County Commissioner, she now serves as the Secretary of the University of North Carolina Board of Governors.

== Career ==
Burris-Floyd was elected to the North Carolina House of Representatives in 2008 to succeed fellow Republican Debbie Clary, who retired to run for the North Carolina Senate. in 2010 she ran for re-election to a 2nd term, but was narrowly defeated in the primary by Kelly Hastings. She ran for the seat again in 2012, where she lost to Hastings in the primary by a much wider margin. In 2020 she ran for the open office of North Carolina Commissioner of Labor being vacated by Cherie Berry. In the March primary, she came in first in her home county of Gaston, as well as in Craven, Carteret, and Lee Counties, but overall she finished 3rd behind State Representative Josh Dobson (who won the nomination) and Chuck Stanley. in 2015, Burris-Floyd was appointed to the University of North Carolina Board of Governors. She was re-appointed to the seat in 2019 for a term ending in 2023. She currently serves as the Board's Secretary.

== Electoral history ==
=== 2020 ===
North Carolina Commissioner of Labor Republican primary election, 2020
Party	Candidate	Votes	%
Republican	Josh Dobson	274,379	40.29%
Republican	Chuck Stanley	257,883	37.87%
Republican	Pearl Burris-Floyd	148,710	21.84%
Total votes		680,972	100%

=== 2012 ===
North Carolina House of Representatives 110th district Republican primary election, 2012
Party	Candidate	Votes	%
Republican	Kelly Hastings (incumbent)	4,948	63.99%
Republican	Pearl Burris-Floyd	2,784	36.01%
Total votes		7,732	100%

=== 2010 ===
North Carolina House of Representatives 110th district Republican primary election, 2010
Party	Candidate	Votes	%
Republican	Kelly Hastings	1,368	52.68%
Republican	Pearl Burris-Floyd (incumbent)	1,229	47.32%
Total votes		2,597	100%

=== 2008 ===
North Carolina House of Representatives 110th district general election, 2008
Party	Candidate	Votes	%
Republican	Pearl Burris-Floyd	14,683	50.88%
Democratic	Davy Lowman	14,173	49.12%
Total votes		28,856	100%
Republican hold			

== Committee assignments ==
=== 2009–2010 Session ===
- Appropriations
- Appropriations – Health and Human Services
- Aging
- Education
- Education – Universities
- Election Law and Campaign Finance Reform
- Health
- Mental Health Reform

North Carolina House of Representatives
Preceded by Debbie Clary	Member of the North Carolina House of Representatives from the 110th district 2009–2011	Succeeded by Kelly Hastings
