= Donald A. Bonner =

American politician (1935–2021)

Donald Bonner
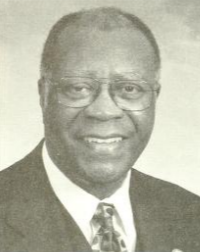
- Bonner in the 2003 legislative manual

Member of the North Carolina House of Representatives
- In office January 1, 1997 – January 1, 2005
- Preceded by: Frances McArthur Cummings
- Succeeded by: Garland Pierce
- Constituency: 87th district (1997-2003); 48th District (2003-2005)

Personal details
- Born: Donald Allen Bonner; June 22, 1935 Rowland, North Carolina, U.S.
- Died: September 10, 2021 (aged 86) Chapel Hill, North Carolina, U.S.
- Party: Democratic
- Education: North Carolina Central University (BS, MS); East Carolina University (EdS)
- Profession: Educator

Donald Allen Bonner (June 22, 1935 – September 10, 2021) was a Democratic member of the North Carolina General Assembly representing the state's forty-eighth House district, including constituents in Hoke, Robeson and Scotland counties. He is a retired educator from Rowland, North Carolina. Bonner died on September 10, 2021.

== Recent electoral history ==
=== 2002 ===
North Carolina House of Representatives 48th district general election, 2002
Party	Candidate	Votes	%
Democratic	Donald Bonner (incumbent)	9,968	100%
Total votes		9,968	100%
Democratic hold			

=== 2000 ===
North Carolina House of Representatives 87th district Democratic primary election, 2000
Party	Candidate	Votes	%
Democratic	Donald Bonner (incumbent)	5,470	77.57%
Democratic	Rusty Perry	1,582	22.43%
Total votes		7,052	100%

North Carolina House of Representatives 87th district general election, 2000
Party	Candidate	Votes	%
Democratic	Donald Bonner (incumbent)	12,755	100%
Total votes		12,755	100%
Democratic hold			

North Carolina House of Representatives
Preceded by Frances McArthur Cummings	Member of the North Carolina House of Representatives from the 87th district 1997–2003	Succeeded by Edgar Starnes
Preceded by Debbie Clary; Andy Dedmon; John Weatherly	Member of the North Carolina House of Representatives from the 48th district 2003–2005	Succeeded by Garland Pierce
