= Ben Ruffin =

American civil rights activist, educator and businessman (1941-2006)

- Born: Benjamin Sylvester Ruffin; December 11, 1941; Durham, North Carolina, U.S.
- Died: December 7, 2006 (aged 64); Winston-Salem, North Carolina, U.S.
- Education: North Carolina Central University
- Occupation: Chairman of the University of North Carolina Board of Governors
- Movement: Civil Rights Movement
- Spouse: Avon Ruffin
- Children: 2

Benjamin Sylvester Ruffin (December 11, 1941 – December 7, 2006), also known as Ben Ruffin, was an African American civil rights activist, educator, and businessman in Durham, North Carolina.

Growing up during the Civil Rights Movement era, Ruffin's life experience in Durham has provided him with a black consciousness that helped him analyze and empathize with the difficulty of growing up poor and black in America. This thus motivated, shaped and developed Ruffin's role as an activist, propelling him to assume leadership positions within organizations that ensured social justice and access to opportunities for blacks in the Jim Crow South. Through cultural cohesion, Ruffin created a bridge between his world of black Durham and that of white Durham, integrating minorities to a bigger presence within the Durham community. He achieved success against difficult odds of bridging racial gaps through tackling the role of poverty, effectively bringing better housing, employment opportunities, and educational access to black citizens.

== Historical context ==
The Civil Rights Movement was a time period that encompasses mass social protest in the United States that aimed to end racial segregation and discrimination against black Americans. This period saw a wide expanse of nonviolent protest and civil disobedience, with activities such as boycotts, marches, and sit-ins, including the Royal Ice Cream Sit-In in Durham that resulted in a court case challenging the legality of segregated facilities. Leaders of the black community, like Martin Luther King Jr. and Malcolm X, began to emerge. Ben Ruffin was a leader of the black community in Durham.

Durham was seen as more "liberal" than other Southern cities. Racial tensions and conflicts in Durham were often less severe than those in other towns, yet they still existed. Separation and segregation in public life resulted in employment in inferior facilities as well as prejudicial treatment. Many black citizens were left to find work at tobacco plants or to establish their own businesses within black neighborhoods. Barred from skilled employment, many suffered from poverty.

In addition, the city was split by a set of railroad tracks, dividing the white community and the black community. One side contained beautifully constructed houses while the other gave sight to boarded-up and dirty houses and streets. Durham segregated the people by their living situations, intentionally disallowing the mingling between whites and blacks. The city thus sustained its discrimination against their black citizens.

Durham developed a prominent Civil Rights Movement because of its substantial African-American community. The struggle for civil rights experienced by blacks was greatly impacted by racial injustice and poverty. Ruffin's experience growing up in Durham draws upon both issues, influencing his motivation to become a civil rights activist.

== Early life and education ==
=== Childhood ===
Benjamin S. "Ben" Ruffin was born in Durham, North Carolina, on December 11, 1941, to Benjamin F. Ruffin Jr. and Catherine Ruffin.

Growing up, he lived in a section of Durham called the West End, one of the several black communities in the city. West End was a "tight knit community" that shared a family-like bond. When Ruffin suffered from a strangulated hernia as an infant, his neighbor Ms. Arluna Dunn visited and prayed for his healing every day. She would comfort Ruffin's mother by stating that the Lord had shown her that Ben was going to be a leader, a Black Moses to save the people. Eventually, Ruffin healed and developed a close relationship with Dunn. She became instrumental in his life in terms of his spirituality. She constantly sang hymns and quoted scriptures to Ruffin. He maintained a close relationship with her throughout his life frequently bringing back gifts and updates on his life. Since infancy, Ruffin was told that he was special and there was a calling on his life. His family, local community, and church regularly reinforced this confidence for his ambition.

=== High school and college ===
Ben Ruffin's experiences growing up in Durham's West End neighborhood during the Civil Rights Movement of the 1960s largely shaped Ruffin's perspective on educational access and opportunity. Ruffin often talked about growing up in poverty and how his mother would encourage him to excel in school, despite his social status preventing him otherwise.

He graduated from Hillside High School in 1960. After graduating, Ruffin was encouraged to take tailoring classes as "no one from Durham's West End goes on to college". Ruffin worked in a shop sewing cuffs and listening to black community leaders chat about the happenings in the community as they dropped off their suits. It was during this period that Ruffin learned that "we are all standing on the shoulders of those who have gone before us." Ruffin developed the idea of going to college, determined to get involved politically.

He continued his pursuit of education and received his bachelor's degree in political science, from North Carolina Central University in 1964. He later earned a Master of Social Work (MSW) degree from the University of North Carolina at Chapel Hill. Ruffin also received honorary degrees from North Carolina Agricultural and Technical State University, Elizabeth City State University, Winston-Salem State University, Livingstone College and Edward Waters College.

== Civil rights activism ==
=== Marches and demonstrations ===
Upon entering college, Ruffin became involved with community work, organizing marches and demonstrations while rising as a leader. Ruffin was influenced by a speech Martin Luther King Jr. gave at his college, and he decided to organize a group of students to walk down "Walgreen's and Kress" and "not say anything but let our presence be known". During this march a white girl spat on the marchers and struck a girl in the arm with a hatpin. Ruffin did not condone fighting back with violence as he wished for his demonstrations to be peaceful. Although he did not advocate for violence, he also did not hide from conflict. Whenever he saw or experienced discrimination against blacks, he voiced his opinions and demanded better treatment. People remember him as a passionate and strong advocate for justice who knew no bounds, had no fears, and accepted no less than equal rights.

=== Durham housing ===
In the early 1960s, Ben assumed major leadership responsibilities as the Chairman of the Durham Housing Authority. Directing a group of 21 neighborhood councils, Ruffin worked to improve housing, employment and neighborhoods in Durham. This project promised greater opportunities and improved living conditions for Durham's black residents as many were restricted to substandard housing and the "slum life". When Ruffin learned that builders were not putting adequate insulation and firewalls into houses, he went to building sites and stated, "I asked for nice homes for my people and you’re not going to just throw anything together, you’re going to come back in here and do these walls." The builders then corrected their methods, and the houses were built to code.

In the late 1960s, Ruffin along with others became major figures in gaining black representation in Durham 's policy-making agencies and protesting inequities in managing the city's public housing. He often helped organize sit-ins and other demonstrations aimed at integrating businesses in Durham. Ben Ruffin's work "served as a model for similar efforts across the state and the South." Ruffin is thus largely known for his dedication to the causes of underprivileged blacks. He left a lasting impression on his townspeople as a freedom fighter and someone who dared to challenge the status quo. Continuing his advocacy for justice, Ruffin moved into governmental roles, and later corporate America, creating change from the inside.

=== Governmental work ===
In 1977, Ruffin was appointed Special Assistant for Minority Affairs to former North Carolina governor Jim Hunt’s first administration. During his seven-year tenure from 1977 to 1984, Ruffin was instrumental in increasing the number of black judges in the state and increasing the number of blacks employed in state government, making tremendous strides in including blacks in state governments and political processes. Ruffin successfully contributed to helping black presence become more widespread in governmental roles. Progressively, more black governmental staff became employed such as: Richard Ervin, a Federal Judge and a Supreme Court Judge; a black man on the Utilities Commission; chair of the Parole State Board in the state of North Carolina; a black Deputy Secretary; and Karen Callaway as the first black female judge in Durham County. It is believed that many of his successes he achieved during Hunt's administration were due to his earlier experience as a community organizer.

Working for the governor, Ruffin's expanded his horizons seeing poverty and hardship beyond Durham in the surrounding communities. Ruffin noticed that people were living with little help after visiting several North Carolina counties. They were stuck in a negative cycle of poverty. Later on, Ruffin continued his focus on civil rights through tackling poverty for minorities by improving education systems, helping them to develop workforce skills, and increasing their opportunities.

=== Business career ===
After serving as special assistant to Jim Hunt’s administration, Ruffin moved into the corporate business world. Because of his educational background, Ruffin was able to become a successful businessman. He worked as the vice president and special assistant to the president of North Carolina Mutual Life Insurance Company for two years. In 1986, he was appointed director of corporate affairs for R.J.R. Nabisco, and in 1989, he became vice president for Corporate Affairs at R.J. Reynolds Tobacco Company. In this position, he led the company with connections to minority businesses, better integrating the presence of minorities within the workforce.

Ruffin's transition and rise to prominence in the business environment gave example to the black community of a leader doing well against the odds in corporate America. Rising to the senior-level position of vice president, Ruffin took the same passion and commitment he had in state government to R.J. Reynolds Tobacco Company. To increase employment opportunities for minorities, Ruffin pushed for the corporation to increase business with minority contractors. His work resulted in a significant growth in the number of minority employees and contracted work with minority businesses.

In 1999, Ruffin moved from a full-time position with R.J. Reynolds to an advisory relationship. With mixed emotions, he retired from his position to focus more attention on his work with the university system as part of the University of North Carolina Board of Governors.

=== Educator ===
Ruffin's experiences in corporate America positioned him to be appointed to the University of North Carolina Board of Governors in 1991. Previously serving as Secretary and vice-chair, Ruffin was promoted to Chair of the UNC Board of Governors on July 11, 1998. He was the first black to serve as the chairman that oversees the university's 16-campus system. In 2000, he was unanimously re-elected for a second term. He served on the UNC Board of Governors as Member Emeritus until his death in December 2006.

Ruffin chaired the UNC Board of Governors from 1991 to 1998. During the time of Ruffin's appointment, the UNC Board of Governors was going through monumental changes. As the policy making body legally charged with the "general administration, control, supervision, management, and governance of all affairs of the constituent institutions", its board adopted the Long Range Plan in 1976. The Long Range Plan included eight interrelated strategic directions to pursue, all of which would contribute to providing better educational opportunities to North Carolinians.

Ruffin began his tenure on the Board of Governors facing challenges of educational access and equity. In receiving his chairman position, Ruffin stated, "I always believed education was the bridge to improve the quality of life. More education – more opportunity. I believed that if you acquire education, you will have more choices. Poverty equals lack of options. I grew up poor... I know what a university can do, and I know what it did for me personally." His first strategic direction was to increase opportunities for North Carolinians to participate in higher education, consistent with their abilities and needs. This resulted in an increase of demographic diversity within institutions and more minorities being able to receive higher paying jobs.

Ruffin "spoke his mind" and wasn't afraid to give his perspective. He tackled issues particularly on access, affordable tuition, and equal opportunity for all institutions in the system. The election of Ben Ruffin as the first black chair of the Board of Governors was an important victory for the black community as well as the state of North Carolina. The presence of a person of color serving at the highest level of leadership in higher education sent a strong message of inclusion to members of the community.

== Other notable roles ==
Known and admired around the country, Ruffin was also chair of the corporate roundtable of the National Black Caucus of State Legislators; a member of the N.C. Institute for Minority Economic Development; a member of the Congressional Black Caucus Foundation; chair of the board of directors of North Carolina Mutual Life Insurance Company; and a member of the boards of Mechanics & Farmers. He was also a former member of the National Urban League's board of directors. In 1999, Ruffin also served as president and chief executive officer (CEO) of his company, The Ruffin Group, headquartered in Winston-Salem.

== Awards and nominations ==
Ruffin received many awards and honors during his career. Among them are eight honorary degrees from colleges and universities: the 1991 NAACP Kelly Miller Alexander Humanitarian Award, the North Carolina Kappa Man of the Year Award, Distinguished Alumni Awards from the University of North Carolina School of Social Work, the North Carolina Association of Black County Officials Frederick Douglass Leadership Award, and the National Urban League's Donald H. McGannan Citation.

== Personal life ==
Ben Ruffin was a "life" and "golden heritage" member of the NAACP, a Prince Hall Mason and former polemarch of the Winston-Salem Alumni chapter of Kappa Alpha Psi fraternity. In addition to his many accomplishments, Ruffin was an active member of Emmanuel Baptist Church, serving as a Sunday school teacher and usher. He was married to his wife Avon for nearly 32 years, and had two daughters. He also had a brother and three sisters.
