= Wes Westmoreland =

American businessman and politician (born 1964)

Theodore G. "Wes" Westmoreland, II
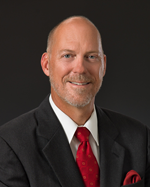

Member of the North Carolina Senate from the 46th district
- In office January 27, 2012 – January 1, 2013
- Preceded by: Debbie Clary
- Succeeded by: Warren Daniel

Personal details
- Born: Theodore Garmon Westmoreland II; May 4, 1964 (age 62) Shelby, North Carolina, U.S.
- Party: Republican
- Education: Gardner-Webb University, Bachelor of Arts, Political science, 1988
- Occupation: Printer, former state senator

Theodore Garmon "Wes" Westmoreland, II is a printer, entrepreneur, businessman and former state senator. Westmoreland was appointed to the North Carolina Senate by Governor Beverly Perdue to fill the unexpired term of North Carolina Senator Debbie Clary in 2012. He is the second great grandson of John Franklin Westmoreland, also a printer, who also served in the North Carolina Senate 26th District from 1895 through 1896. Westmoreland is the founder and president of Westmoreland Printers, Inc. based in Shelby, North Carolina. He is a founding board member of Pinnacle Classical Academy, a college preparatory charter school in Cleveland County.

== Career ==
Westmoreland completed his undergraduate degree at Gardner-Webb University in 1988. He is a fifth-generation printer and founded Westmoreland Printers, Inc. in 1999. Westmoreland was named Entrepreneur of the Year by the Cleveland County Chamber of Commerce in 2004.

=== Political career ===
==== North Carolina Senate ====
In 2006, Westmoreland ran for the 46th Senate District seat against incumbent Senator Walter Dalton. In 2012, Westmoreland was appointed to the North Carolina Senate by Governor Bev Perdue to serve the remainder of North Carolina Senator Debbie Clary’s two-year term for the 46th Senate District, at that time comprised Cleveland and Rutherford counties.

==== Legislative service ====
In January 2012, Westmoreland was appointed to six standing committees including Agriculture/Environment/Natural Resources, Appropriations on Natural and Economic Resources, Commerce, Finance, Judiciary II and Program Evaluation. During the short session of 2012, Westmoreland was the primary sponsor of two bills passed into law, SB 805 and SB 951. As a member of the Program Evaluation Committee, Westmoreland added a study to review the process of opening charter schools in North Carolina.

== Other activities ==
Westmoreland is a founding board member of Pinnacle Classical Academy, a college preparatory charter school in Cleveland County, serving as board chair from 2014-2017. Westmoreland also serves as a director of Polyhymnia, a think-tank that "advances American culture through engagement with the aesthetic and philosophical foundations of Western society".

In 2013, Westmoreland was appointed to the Rural Infrastructure Authority for the North Carolina Department of Commerce, and elected Vice-Chairman in August 2017, serving until 2023. He also served on the board of the directors of the Printing Industries of the Carolinas from 2013-2017, a trustee for Cleveland Community College from 2014-2022, serving as chair for the 2017-19 academic years, and on the Executive Board of the North Carolina Association of Community College Trustees.

Previously, Westmoreland served on the Board of Directors of Cleveland County Communities in Schools and the Commercial Graphics Advisory Committee of Spartanburg Technical College. He also served as President of the Gardner-Webb University Alumni Association and was a Trustee for Gardner-Webb from 2006 through 2009.

North Carolina Senate
Preceded by Debbie Clary	Member of the North Carolina Senate from the 46th district 2012–2013	Succeeded by Warren Daniel
