= Elihu A. White =

American politician and farmer (1834-1900)

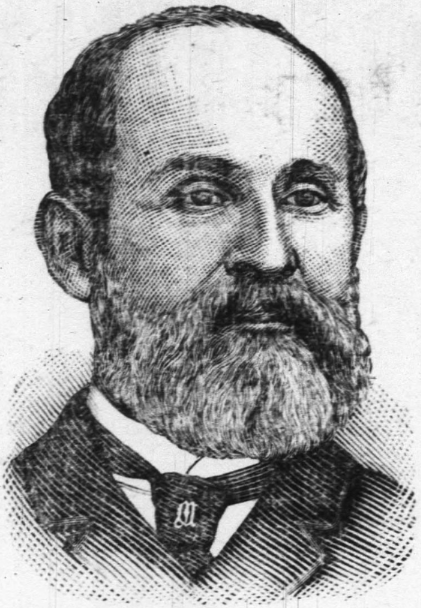
Engraved portrait of Elihu A. White

Elihu Anthony White (November 18, 1834 – February 7, 1900) was an American politician and farmer.

== Early life ==
Elihu Anthony White was born on November 18, 1834 in Belvidere, North Carolina. He was educated at the Belvidere Academy in his youth and spent one year at the New Garden School in Greensboro in 1852. He took over his family farm and farmed through much of his life. He married Margaret M. White in 1870 and had five children with her. He married Emma Haughton White in 1885 and had two children with her.

== Career ==
White served as postmaster of Newby's Bridge from 1858 to 1861. In 1868 he was elected to the North Carolina Senate as a Republican, serving until 1870. In 1873 he served as a justice of the peace. In July 1873 he was appointed to the Perquimans County Board of Commissioners to fill a vacancy and was made chairman of the body. Subsequently winning his seat by popular election, he served on the board as its chair until December 1878.

U.S. President Rutherford B. Hayes appointed White a collector of internal revenue in July 1879. He served in that capacity for over three years until the number of federal revenue districts were consolidated in July 1883, leaving White displaced by collector Isaac Young. Young offered White a subordinate position in his office which he declined. In 1886 he was elected to the North Carolina House of Representatives. He served during its 1887 session, chairing the committee on fish and serving on the committees for finance, education, the insane asylum, and the asylum for the deaf and dumb. In 1888, White ran for a seat in the U. S. House of Representatives, losing to Thomas Gregory Skinner. He was again appointed collector of internal revenue in 1893. The following year he was appointed to the University of North Carolina Board of Governors.

White served as a delegate to the Republican National Conventions of 1884, 1888, and 1896.

== Later life ==
Following months of illness, White died at his home in Belvidere on February 7, 1900.

== Works cited ==
- Cheney, John L. Jr., ed. (1975). North Carolina Government, 1585-1974 : a Narrative and Statistical History. Raleigh: North Carolina Department of the Secretary of State.
