= Hillside High School (Durham, North Carolina) =

American public school in North Carolina

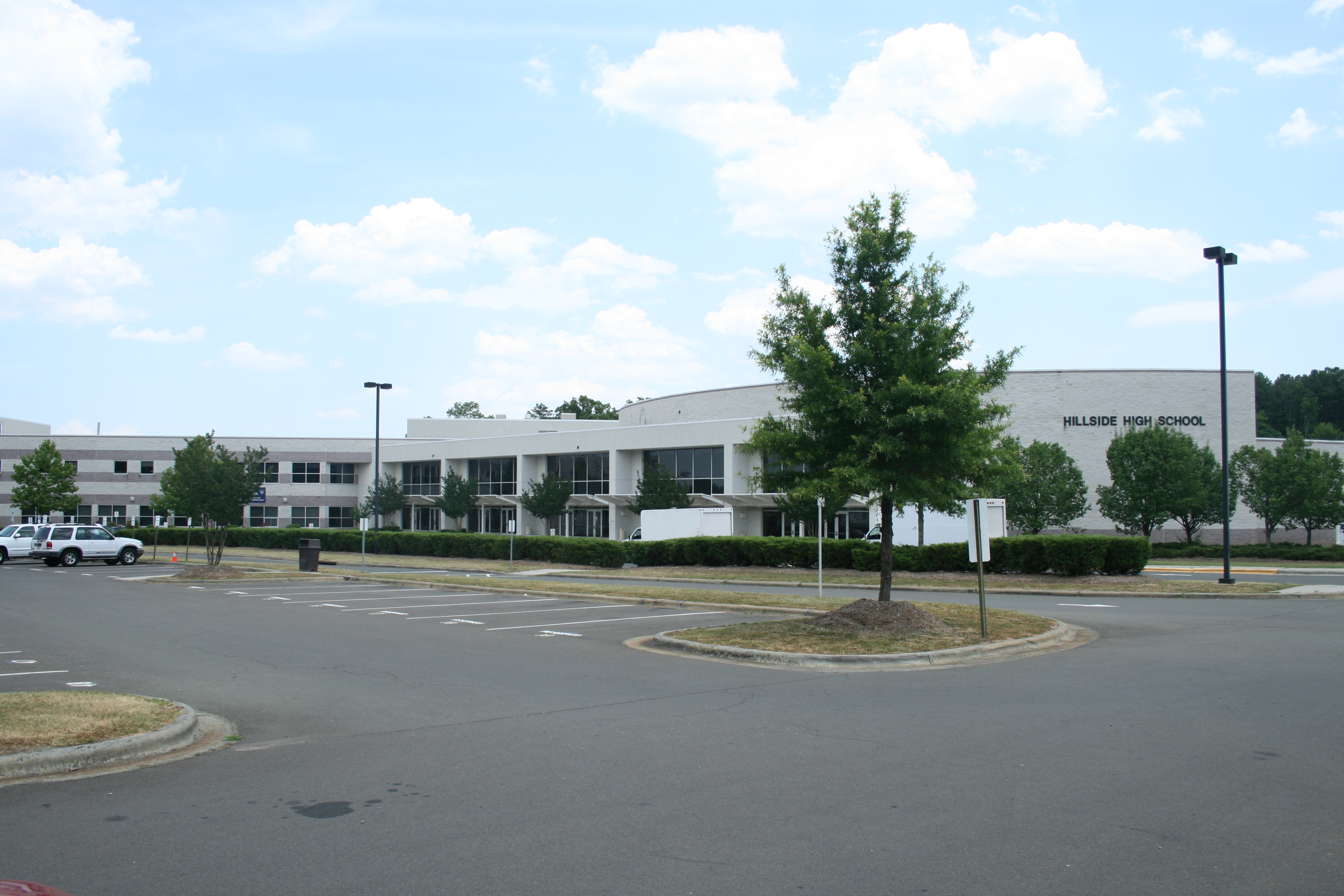
- Hillside High School in 2008

Location
- 3727 Fayetteville St; Durham, North Carolina 27707; United States; 35°57′11″N 78°54′13″W

Information
- Former names: James A. Witted High School (1887–1921); Hillside Park High School (1922–1943)
- Type: Public
- Motto: "Rebuilding and Redefining Academic Excellence!"
- Established: 1887 (139 years ago)
- School district: Durham Public Schools
- CEEB code: 341055
- Principal: Rashard Lee-Worthy
- Teaching staff: 95.30 (FTE)
- Enrollment: 1,454 (2023–2024)
- Student to teacher ratio: 15.26
- Colors: Navy blue and white
- Mascot: Hornet
- Nickname: "The Hornet's Nest", HHS, The Hill
- Website: hillside.dpsnc.net

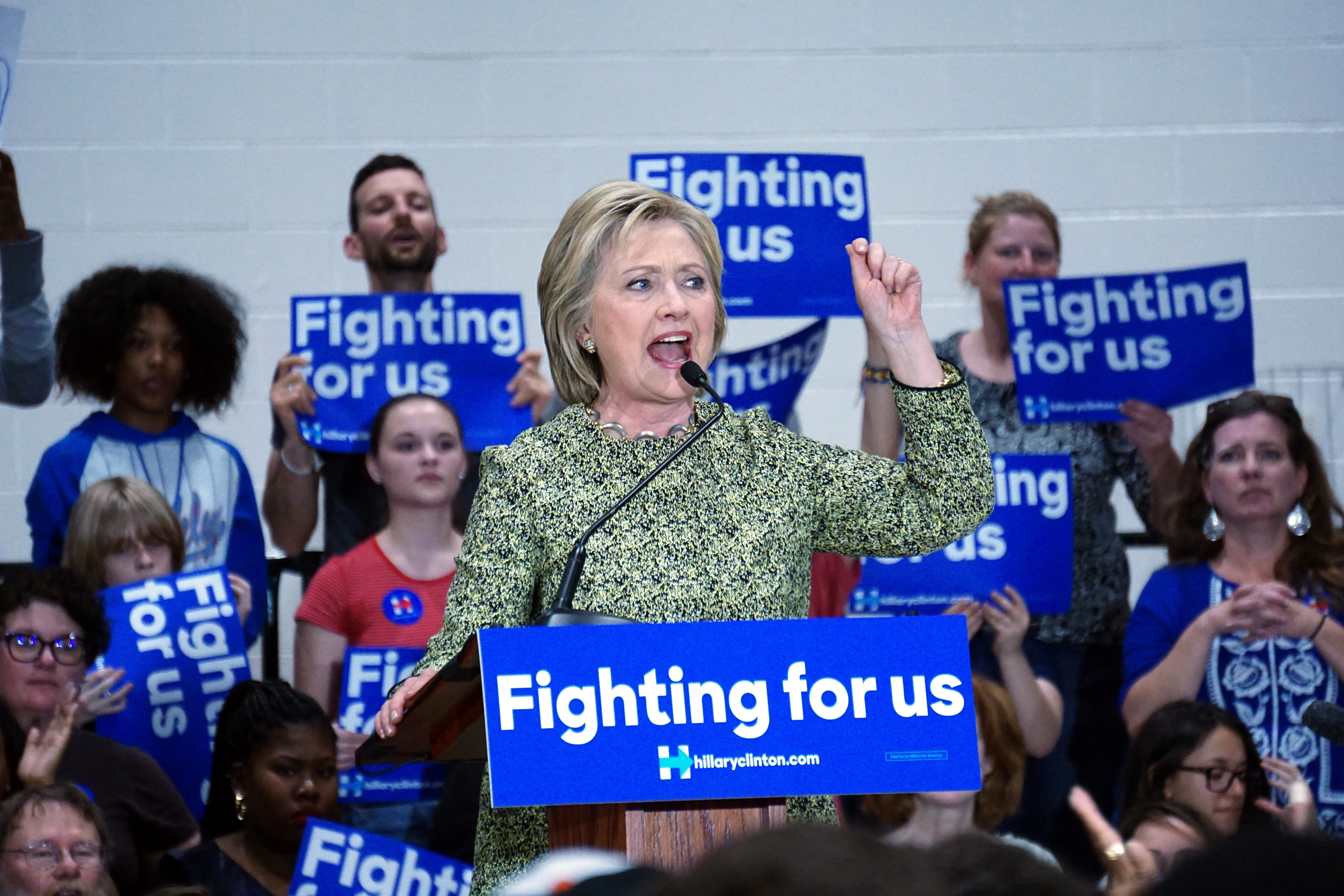
Hillary Clinton holding a campaign rally at Hillside High School, March 2016

Hillside High School (abbreviated HHS) is a four-year high school located in Durham, North Carolina. Hillside is one of seven high schools in the Durham Public Schools system. Of more than 300 historically black high schools that once operated in the state before desegregation, only five remain today, with Hillside being the oldest. Hillside is accredited by the Southern Association of Colleges and Schools.

== History ==
The largest black schools in Durham prior to the building of Whitted School in 1887 were the Ledger Public School in Hayti, under the supervision of Miss Ledger, and the Hack Road Public School, where James Whitted was superintendent.

=== Whitted School ===
In 1887, the Whitted School existed as the James A. Whitted High School, in honor of its first principal. The school, which was located on the corner of Blackwell and Pettigrew Streets, burned in 1888 and was located in a Bull Factory warehouse. In 1890, 161 pupils attended the school's six grades. Whitted taught the upper grades, William G. Pearson taught the middle grades, and two female teachers taught the first and second grades.

The first class graduated from the ninth grade of Whitted school in 1896. Also in 1896, a permanent brick building was constructed on Proctor and Ramsey Street for black children at a cost of $8000. In 1899, the building was destroyed and reconstructed, but students were housed in churches during that school year. In 1901, another black school, West End, was built. At this time 707 students were enrolled in the Durham black graded schools. In 1909, the East End School was constructed.

Only nine grades existed at Whitted from 1896 until 1911, but in 1911 a tenth grade was added. The 11th grade was added in 1918. From 1919 until 1920, first graders were housed in "dog houses," which were temporary shacks near the brick school building.

The Whitted School, which was in poor condition, burned in 1921, and students had to attend double sessions at East End and West End Schools.

=== Hillside Park ===
John Sprunt Hill, a leading Durham citizen, donated land for a new building on Pine and Umstead Street, which was named Hillside Park High School in honor of the donor and due to the fact that the school was located next to Hillside Park, a public city owned black park. The class of 1944 was the first to graduate under the 12 year system. A public address system was installed in the school in 1943 at a cost of $150.

The "Park" was dropped from the name Hillside High School in 1943.

=== Repurposing and building ===
In 1950, because of overcrowding in the high school, the Hillside High School students moved into what was then called Whitted Junior High School, located near the campus of North Carolina Central University (NCCU) and now the site of an NCCU science classroom building, and the Whitted Junior High School students moved into the old Hillside Park High School building closer to downtown Durham. The schools buildings also swapped names. Hillside High School at this time only enrolled grades 10, 11 and 12 and Whitted Junior High School enrolled 7, 8 and 9.

Additions of an auditorium, cafeteria, auto shop, classroom and gymnasium were made to accommodate the large number of transferred high school students in 1949. A classroom annex was added to the Hillside building in 1962. In 1966 a new library was added. A new band room was constructed in 1975.

=== After 1995 ===
Hillside was relocated to a new building in 1995.

Eunice Sanders was Hillside's principal from 2002–2006, resigning after the 2005–06 school year to move to an administrative position within the Durham Public Schools Central Office. Earl Pappy was the principal of Hillside from 2006–2009. He was followed by Hans Lassiter who served as principal from 2009–2012. He was followed by William Logan who serves as principal from 2012–2024

The current principal is Joshua Mallory

== Programs ==
Hillside offers the International Baccalaureate and AVID programs to academically gifted students. This school offers career pathways in engineering and cosmetology. It also offers many Advanced Placement classes. Hillside High recently created a freshman academy to help incoming freshmen matriculate and excel in their academics.

== Athletics ==
- Boys Sports: football, cross country, soccer, basketball, wrestling, indoor track, baseball, outdoor track, tennis
- Girls Sports: indoor track, outdoor track (3A State Champions 2001–2005), softball, basketball, volleyball, tennis, cross country, soccer
- Co-ed Sports: Golf
- Traditionally Hillside's rivals are: Durham High School (closed in 1993), Southern High School (North Carolina), Charles E. Jordan High School, and James B. Dudley High School.
- Hillside Boys football 1943 (undefeated, untied, and unscored upon).
- Hillside Boys basketball team won the 1965 North Carolina 4A State Championship verses West Charlotte.
- Hillside Boys 1966 basketball team, nicknamed the "Pony Express", average over 100 points a game in four 8 minutes quarters.
- Hillside 2010 football team went 16–0 and won the North Carolina 4A State Championship game 40–0 over Davie County at BB&T field in Winston-Salem, NC
- Hillside Girls Basketball Team went 25–2 in 1996 to win the Girl's 4-A State Championship.

== Student life ==
Hillside High also has a long held tradition of having community service organizations guided and modeled after college fraternities and sororities. Groups such as Theta Phi Psi Fraternity, Inc. and Chi Omega Lambda function as leadership and also social groups among students.

== Notable people ==
- Ernie Barnes, artist, actor, author, and professional football player
- Shirley Caesar, gospel music singer, songwriter, and recording artist
- Eric L. Clay, U.S. judge
- Wes Covington, Major League Baseball player
- Allyson Kay Duncan, judge on the United States Court of Appeals for the Fourth Circuit
- Ada Fisher, physician and politician
- Bill Hayes, football coach and college athletics administrator
- Biff Henderson, comedian and television personality best known for his work with Late Show with David Letterman
- April Parker Jones, American television and film actress
- Cicero Leak, American talent agent
- Vad Lee, American football quarterback
- Greg Little, NFL wide receiver
- Jeanne Hopkins Lucas, North Carolina State Senator
- John Lucas II, NBA player and coach
- Pauli Murray, civil rights activist and writer of "Proud Shoes"
- Elaine O'Neal, first African-American woman to serve as Mayor of Durham, former North Carolina Superior Court judge
- Robert Calvin"Shorty" Rivers, attorney, Class of 1969, last all-Black class to graduate from HHS.
- Rodney Rogers, NBA player
- Charles Romes, NFL cornerback
- Ben Ruffin, civil rights activist, educator, and businessman
- Thomas Stith, III, North Carolina political figure
- Dwight Sullivan, United States Football League player
- André Leon Talley, fashion journalist and editor-at-large ofVogue magazine
- Grady Tate, jazz and soul jazz drummer and baritone vocalist
- Charles DeWitt Watts, surgeon and activist
- Harvey D. Williams, African-American U.S. Army major general
- Tommy Wilson, NFL running back
- Kevin Wilson Jr., American filmmaker
