= Debbie Clary =

American politician (born 1959)

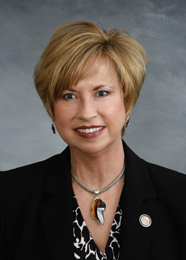
- Clary in 2009

Member of the North Carolina Senate from the 46th district
- In office January 1, 2009 – January 10, 2012
- Preceded by: Walter Dalton
- Succeeded by: Wes Westmoreland

Member of the North Carolina House of Representatives
- In office January 1, 1995 – January 1, 2009
- Preceded by: Edith Ledford Lutz
- Succeeded by: Pearl Burris-Floyd
- Constituency: 48th District (1995-2003); 110th District (2003-2009)

Personal details
- Born: August 29, 1959 (age 67) Shelby, North Carolina, U.S.
- Party: Republican
- Education: Gardner-Webb University
- Occupation: marketing professional

Debbie Ann Clary (born August 29, 1959 in Shelby, North Carolina) is a Republican member of the North Carolina General Assembly representing the state's 46th Senate district, including constituents in Rutherford and Cleveland counties. She previously served in the state House serving the 110th district.

Clary is a marketing professional from Cherryville, North Carolina. In 2008, Clary retired her house seat to run for N.C. Senate District 46. On November 4, 2008, Clary defeated former Rutherford County Clerk of Court Keith H. Melton to win the seat.

In June 2011, Clary announced that she would be retiring from the State Senate. Her resignation became effective January 10, 2012.

== Electoral history ==
=== 2010 ===
North Carolina Senate 46th district general election, 2010
Party	Candidate	Votes	%
Republican	Debbie Clary (incumbent)	32,007	100%
Total votes		32,007	100%
Republican hold			

=== 2008 ===
North Carolina Senate 46th district general election, 2008
Party	Candidate	Votes	%
Republican	Debbie Clary	36,059	50.50%
Democratic	Keith H. Melton	35,338	49.50%
Total votes		71,397	100%
Republican gain from Democratic			

=== 2006 ===
North Carolina House of Representatives 110th district general election, 2006
Party	Candidate	Votes	%
Republican	Debbie Clary (incumbent)	8,888	62.19%
Democratic	Jim Long	5,404	37.81%
Total votes		14,294	100%
Republican hold			

=== 2004 ===
North Carolina House of Representatives 110th district Republican primary election, 2004
Party	Candidate	Votes	%
Republican	Debbie Clary (incumbent)	1,366	63.80%
Republican	Floyd Wright	775	36.20%
Total votes		2,141	100%

North Carolina House of Representatives 110th district general election, 2004
Party	Candidate	Votes	%
Republican	Debbie Clary (incumbent)	14,690	63.49%
Democratic	Jim Long	8,448	36.51%
Total votes		23,138	100%
Republican hold			

=== 2002 ===
North Carolina House of Representatives 110th district Republican primary election, 2002
Party	Candidate	Votes	%
Republican	Debbie Clary (incumbent)	1,929	68.45%
Republican	Joe D. Carpenter	889	31.55%
Total votes		2,818	100%

North Carolina House of Representatives 110th district general election, 2002
Party	Candidate	Votes	%
Republican	Debbie Clary (incumbent)	11,402	100%
Total votes		11,402	100%
Republican hold			

=== 2000 ===
North Carolina House of Representatives 48th district general election, 2000
Party	Candidate	Votes	%
Republican	Debbie Clary (incumbent)	35,545	19.71%
Democratic	Andy Dedmon (incumbent)	32,641	18.10%
Republican	John Weatherly	31,200	17.30%
Democratic	Jim Horn (incumbent)	28,952	16.06%
Republican	Dennis H. Davis	27,563	15.29%
Democratic	Connie Goforth-Greene	24,420	13.54%
Total votes		180,321	100%
Republican hold			
Democratic hold			
Republican gain from Democratic			

North Carolina House of Representatives
Preceded by Edith Ledford Lutz	Member of the North Carolina House of Representatives from the 48th district 1995–2003	Succeeded by Donald Bonner
Preceded by Constituency established	Member of the North Carolina House of Representatives from the 110th district 2003–2009	Succeeded by Pearl Burris-Floyd
North Carolina Senate
Preceded by Walter Dalton	Member of the North Carolina Senate from the 46th district 2009–2012	Succeeded by Wes Westmoreland
