= Cicero Leak =

American talent agent

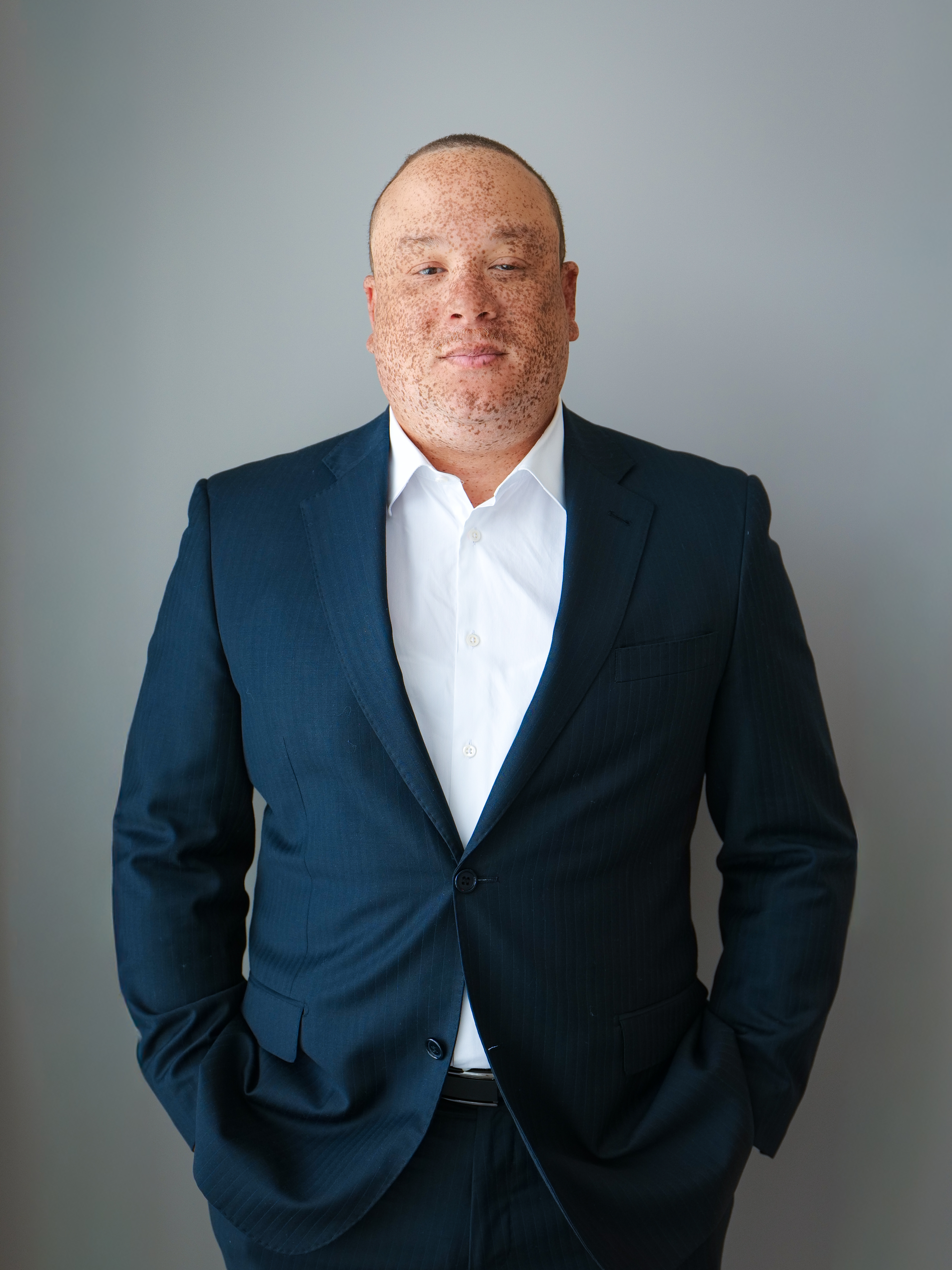

Cicero Leak is an American talent agent. He is the CEO of The Victor Group (TVG) which provides representation for clients in motion pictures, television, brand strategy, content creation, intellectual property and sports. Leak was a founding partner of the TLS Agency and was instrumental in shaping its November 2025 merger.

== Early life and education ==
He grew up in Durham, North Carolina where he attended Hillside High School. After high school, Leak attended North Carolina Central University.

== Career ==
In 2009 Leak started TLS Agency. With just three clients, the TLS client list quickly grew in 2011 by signing Grammy Award Winning singer Fantasia Barrino, Academy Award nominee director James Fargo, entrepreneur and star of ABC's Shark Tank Daymond John, BET Network host and national syndicated radio personality Big Tigger, actress April Parker Jones, MTV Network host and national syndicated radio personality Sway Calloway.

Leak was named one the Honorees of the 2014 North Carolina Central University 40 under 40 Alumni Award.

Leak was named one of Black Enterprise Magazine BE Modern Man Honorees in 2018.

Leak was acknowledged by Diverse Representation as one of the Top Ten Professionals in sports and entertainment to watch in 2021.

Leak along with TLS Managing Partner's launched a new sports division, TLS Sports in 2021. The new division will represent professional athletes, coaches, NIL (Name, Image, Likeness) athletes, on-air personalities.

In 2025, TLS rebrands to The Victor Group (TVG).

Leak and The Victor Group was recognized by Shoppe Black as one of the Black-Owned Sports Agencies Changing the Game in 2025.

== Personal ==
Leak is married to Kristi Leak. He has three children, Cicero IV, Emerii and Leah.
