= North Carolina's 46th Senate district =

American legislative district

North Carolina's 46th State Senate district
Senator
| Warren Daniel; R–Morganton |
- Demographics: 84% White; 4% Black; 7% Hispanic; 2% Asian; 2% Multiracial
- Population (2023): 198,878

North Carolina's 46th Senate district is one of 50 districts in the North Carolina Senate. It has been represented by Republican Warren Daniel since 2013.

== Geography ==
Since 2023, the district has covered all of Burke and McDowell counties, as well as part of Buncombe County. The district overlaps with the 85th, 86th, 113th, 114th, and 115th state house districts.

== District officeholders since 2003 ==
| Senator | Party | Dates | Notes | Counties |
|---|---|---|---|---|
| District created January 1, 2003. | | | | 2003–2013; All of Rutherford and Cleveland counties. |
| Walter Dalton (Rutherfordton) | Democratic | January 1, 2003 – January 1, 2009 | Redistricted from the 37th district. Retired to run for Lieutenant Governor. | 2003–2013; All of Rutherford and Cleveland counties. |
| Debbie Clary (Cherryville) | Republican | January 1, 2009 – January 10, 2012 | Resigned. | 2003–2013; All of Rutherford and Cleveland counties. |
| Vacant | | January 10, 2012 - January 27, 2012 | | 2003–2013; All of Rutherford and Cleveland counties. |
| Wes Westmoreland (Shelby) | Republican | January 27, 2012 – January 1, 2013 | Appointed to finish Clary's term. Retired. | 2003–2013; All of Rutherford and Cleveland counties. |
| Warren Daniel (Morganton) | Republican | January 1, 2013 – Present | Redistricted from the 44th district. | 2013–2019; All of Burke and Cleveland counties. |
| Warren Daniel (Morganton) | Republican | January 1, 2013 – Present | Redistricted from the 44th district. | 2019–2023; All of Burke, Caldwell, and Avery counties. |
| Warren Daniel (Morganton) | Republican | January 1, 2013 – Present | Redistricted from the 44th district. | 2023–Present; All of Burke and McDowell counties. Part of Buncombe County. |

== Election results ==
=== 2024 ===
North Carolina Senate 46th district general election, 2024
| Party | Candidate | Votes | % |
|---|---|---|---|
| Republican | Warren Daniel (incumbent) | 68,675 | 65.23% |
| Democratic | John Ager | 36,604 | 34.77% |
| Total votes | | 105,279 | 100% |
| Republican hold | | | |

=== 2022 ===
North Carolina Senate 46th district Republican primary election, 2022
| Party | Candidate | Votes | % |
|---|---|---|---|
| Republican | Warren Daniel (incumbent) | 12,395 | 61.28% |
| Republican | Mark Crawford | 7,831 | 38.72% |
| Total votes | | 20,226 | 100% |

North Carolina Senate 46th district general election, 2022
| Party | Candidate | Votes | % |
|---|---|---|---|
| Republican | Warren Daniel (incumbent) | 47,709 | 60.25% |
| Democratic | Billy Martin | 31,478 | 39.75% |
| Total votes | | 79,187 | 100% |
| Republican hold | | | |

=== 2020 ===
North Carolina Senate 46th district general election, 2020
| Party | Candidate | Votes | % |
|---|---|---|---|
| Republican | Warren Daniel (incumbent) | 67,919 | 72.28% |
| Democratic | Edward Phifer | 26,045 | 27.72% |
| Total votes | | 93,964 | 100% |
| Republican hold | | | |

=== 2018 ===
North Carolina Senate 46th district general election, 2018
| Party | Candidate | Votes | % |
|---|---|---|---|
| Republican | Warren Daniel (incumbent) | 42,445 | 69.97% |
| Democratic | Art Sherwood | 18,218 | 30.03% |
| Total votes | | 60,663 | 100% |
| Republican hold | | | |

=== 2016 ===
North Carolina Senate 46th district Democratic primary election, 2016
| Party | Candidate | Votes | % |
|---|---|---|---|
| Democratic | Anne Fischer | 7,527 | 53.77% |
| Democratic | Jim Cates | 6,471 | 46.23% |
| Total votes | | 13,998 | 100% |

North Carolina Senate 46th district general election, 2016
| Party | Candidate | Votes | % |
|---|---|---|---|
| Republican | Warren Daniel (incumbent) | 52,997 | 66.16% |
| Democratic | Anne Fischer | 27,106 | 33.84% |
| Total votes | | 80,103 | 100% |
| Republican hold | | | |

=== 2014 ===
North Carolina Senate 46th district general election, 2014
| Party | Candidate | Votes | % |
|---|---|---|---|
| Republican | Warren Daniel (incumbent) | 30,373 | 58.71% |
| Democratic | Emily B. Church | 21,363 | 41.29% |
| Total votes | | 51,736 | 100% |
| Republican hold | | | |

=== 2012 ===
North Carolina Senate 46th district general election, 2012
| Party | Candidate | Votes | % |
|---|---|---|---|
| Republican | Warren Daniel (incumbent) | 43,904 | 55.96% |
| Democratic | John T. McDevitt | 32,409 | 41.31% |
| Libertarian | Richard C. Evey | 2,144 | 2.73% |
| Total votes | | 78,457 | 100% |
| Republican hold | | | |

=== 2010 ===
North Carolina Senate 46th district general election, 2010
| Party | Candidate | Votes | % |
|---|---|---|---|
| Republican | Debbie Clary (incumbent) | 32,007 | 100% |
| Total votes | | 32,007 | 100% |
| Republican hold | | | |

=== 2008 ===
North Carolina Senate 46th district Democratic primary election, 2008
| Party | Candidate | Votes | % |
|---|---|---|---|
| Democratic | Keith H. Melton | 13,522 | 64.55% |
| Democratic | Phil D. Clark | 7,425 | 35.45% |
| Total votes | | 20,947 | 100% |

North Carolina Senate 46th district general election, 2008
| Party | Candidate | Votes | % |
|---|---|---|---|
| Republican | Debbie Clary | 36,059 | 50.50% |
| Democratic | Keith H. Melton | 35,338 | 49.50% |
| Total votes | | 71,397 | 100% |
| Republican gain from Democratic | | | |

=== 2006 ===
North Carolina Senate 46th district general election, 2006
| Party | Candidate | Votes | % |
|---|---|---|---|
| Democratic | Walter Dalton (incumbent) | 22,557 | 54.42% |
| Republican | Wes Westmoreland | 18,890 | 45.58% |
| Total votes | | 41,447 | 100% |
| Democratic hold | | | |

=== 2004 ===
North Carolina Senate 46th district Democratic primary election, 2004
| Party | Candidate | Votes | % |
|---|---|---|---|
| Democratic | Walter Dalton (incumbent) | 6,042 | 83.41% |
| Democratic | James W. "Buck" Carr | 1,202 | 16.59% |
| Total votes | | 7,244 | 100% |

North Carolina Senate 46th district general election, 2004
| Party | Candidate | Votes | % |
|---|---|---|---|
| Democratic | Walter Dalton (incumbent) | 32,595 | 53.43% |
| Republican | James "Jim" Testa | 28,409 | 46.57% |
| Total votes | | 61,004 | 100% |
| Democratic hold | | | |

=== 2002 ===
North Carolina Senate 46th district general election, 2002
| Party | Candidate | Votes | % |
|---|---|---|---|
| Democratic | Walter Dalton (incumbent) | 22,251 | 52.43% |
| Republican | John Weatherly | 19,118 | 45.05% |
| Libertarian | Tony Brown | 1,072 | 2.53% |
| Total votes | | 42,441 | 100% |
| Democratic hold | | | |
