= 2008 North Carolina lieutenant gubernatorial election =

- November 4, 2008
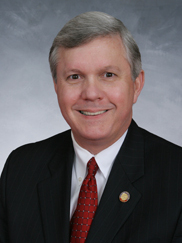

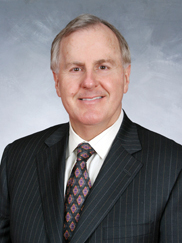
Nominee	Walter Dalton	Robert Pittenger
Party	Democratic	Republican
Popular vote	2,133,058	1,915,012
Percentage	51.1%	45.9%
- County results Dalton: 40–50% 50–60% 60–70% 70–80% Pittenger: 40–50% 50–60% 60–70%
Lieutenant Governor before election
Bev Perdue
Democratic
Elected Lieutenant Governor
Walter Dalton
Democratic

The 2008 North Carolina lieutenant gubernatorial election was held on November 4, 2008, as part of the elections to the Council of State. North Carolina also held a gubernatorial election on the same day, but the offices of governor and lieutenant governor are elected independently.

Democrat Walter Dalton was elected lieutenant governor, succeeding term-limited Beverly Perdue, who was elected governor the same day. Dalton won a slightly larger percentage of the vote than did Perdue in her gubernatorial race, while Republican Robert Pittenger won a slightly smaller percentage than GOP gubernatorial nominee Pat McCrory and Libertarian Phillip Rhodes won a slightly larger percentage than his party's nominee for governor, Michael Munger.

This was the last election until 2024 where a Democrat would be elected Lieutenant Governor of North Carolina.

== Primary elections ==
=== Democratic Party ===
- Walter Dalton, North Carolina State Senator
- Hampton Dellinger, former Deputy Attorney General of North Carolina and former legal counsel to Governor Mike Easley
- Patrick Smathers, Mayor of Canton
- Dan Besse, Winston-Salem City Councilman

Primary results by county: Dalton: Dalton—81-90%; Dalton—71-80%; Dalton—61-70%; Dalton—51-60%; Dalton—41-50%; Dalton—31-40%; Dellinger: Dellinger—61-70%; Dellinger—51-60%; Dellinger—41-50%; Smathers: Smathers—51-60%

Democratic primary results
Party	Candidate	Votes	%
Democratic	Walter Dalton	608,290	45.73%
Democratic	Hampton Dellinger	446,678	33.58%
Democratic	Pat Smathers	182,607	13.73%
Democratic	Dan Besse	92,616	6.96%
Total votes		1,330,191	100.00%

=== Republican Party ===
- Robert Pittenger, North Carolina State Senator
- Jim Snyder, former state representative and nominee for lieutenant governor in 2004
- Timothy Cook, alternative fuel chemist and candidate for lieutenant governor in 2004
- Greg Dority, security consultant

Primary results by county: Pittenger: Pittenger—81-90%; Pittenger—71-80%; Pittenger—61-70%; Pittenger—51-60%; Pittenger—41-50%; Pittenger—31-40%; Pittenger—21-30%; Snyder: Snyder—41-50%; Snyder—31-40%; Cook: Cook—31-40%; Dority: Dority—41-50%; Dority—31-40%

Republican primary results
Party	Candidate	Votes	%
Republican	Robert Pittenger	261,834	58.94%
Republican	Jim Snyder	84,403	19.00%
Republican	Timothy Cook	53,353	12.01%
Republican	Greg Dority	44,668	10.05%
Total votes		444,258	100.00%

== General election ==
=== Candidates ===
- Walter Dalton (Democratic)
- Robert Pittenger (Republican)
- Phillip Rhodes (Libertarian)

=== Results ===
North Carolina lieutenant gubernatorial election, 2008
Party	Candidate	Votes	%
Democratic	Walter Dalton	2,133,058	51.10%
Republican	Robert Pittenger	1,915,012	45.88%
Libertarian	Phillip Rhodes	126,074	3.02%
Total votes		4,174,144	100.00%
Democratic hold			
