= 2028 United States House of Representatives elections in North Carolina =

- November 7, 2028

All 14 North Carolina seats to the United States House of Representatives
Party	Democratic	Republican
Last election	11	3

The 2028 United States House of Representatives elections in North Carolina will be held on November 7, 2028, to elect the 14 U.S. representatives from the state of North Carolina, one from each of the state's congressional districts. The elections will coincide with other elections to the House of Representatives, the presidential election, elections to the United States Senate, and various state and local elections. The primary elections will take place on March 7, 2028.

== District 1 ==
The 1st district includes all of Beaufort, Bertie, Camden, Carteret, Chowan, Craven, Currituck, Dare, Edgecombe, Gates, Halifax, Hertford, Hyde, Martin, Nash, Pamlico, Pasquotank, Perquimans, Tyrrell, Vance, Warren, and Washington counties, as well as a small portion of eastern Granville County. The incumbent is Democrat Don Davis, who was re-elected with 50.1% of the vote in 2026.

=== Democratic primary ===
==== Potential ====
- Don Davis, incumbent U.S. representative

== District 2 ==
The 2nd district includes portions of central Wake County. The incumbent is Democrat Deborah Ross, who was re-elected with 75.1% of the vote in 2026.

=== Democratic primary ===
==== Potential ====
- Deborah Ross, incumbent U.S. representative

== District 3 ==
The 3rd district includes all of Duplin, Greene, Lenoir, Jones, Onslow, Pitt, Wayne, and Wilson counties, as well as most of Sampson County. The incumbent is Democrat Raymond Smith Jr., who flipped the district and was elected with 49.4% of the vote in 2026.

=== Democratic primary ===
==== Potential ====
- Raymond Smith Jr., incumbent U.S. representative

== District 4 ==
The 4th district includes all of Durham and Orange counties, as well as portions of northern Chatham and eastern Wake counties. The incumbent is Democrat Valerie Foushee, who was re-elected with 79.1% of the vote in 2026.

=== Democratic primary ===
==== Potential ====
- Valerie Foushee, incumbent U.S. representative

== District 5 ==
The 5th district includes all of Alexander, Alleghany, Ashe, Caldwell, Rockingham, Stokes, Surry, Watauga, and Wilkes counties, as well as portions of Guilford County. The incumbent is Democrat Chuck Hubbard, who flipped the district and was elected with 48.7% of the vote in 2026.

=== Democratic primary ===
==== Potential ====
- Chuck Hubbard, incumbent U.S. representative

=== Republican primary ===
==== Declared ====
- Virginia Foxx, former U.S. representative (2005–2027)

== District 6 ==
The 6th district includes all of Davidson, Davie, and Rowan counties, as well as portions of northwestern Cabarrus County, eastern Forsyth County, and southwestern Guilford County. The incumbent is Democrat Cyril Jefferson, who flipped the district and was elected with 51.2% of the vote in 2026.

=== Democratic primary ===
==== Potential ====
- Cyril Jefferson, incumbent U.S. representative

=== Republican primary ===
==== Filed paperwork ====
- Addison McDowell, former U.S. representative (2025–2027)

== District 7 ==
The 7th district includes all of Bladen, Brunswick, Columbus, New Hanover, and Pender counties, as well as most of Cumberland County, and portions of eastern Robeson County and northwestern Sampson County. The incumbent is Republican David Rouzer, who was re-elected with 49.8% of the vote in 2026.

=== Republican primary ===
==== Potential ====
- David Rouzer, incumbent U.S. representative

== District 8 ==
The 8th district includes all of Anson, Montgomery, Richmond, Scotland, Stanly, and Union counties, as well as most of Cabarrus County, portions of southern Mecklenburg County, and most of Robeson County. The incumbent is Republican Mark Harris, who was re-elected with 50.3% of the vote in 2026.

=== Republican primary ===
==== Potential ====
- Mark Harris, incumbent U.S. representative

== District 9 ==
The 9th district includes all of Alamance, Hoke, Moore, and Randolph counties, as well as most of Chatham and Guilford counties, and portions of northwestern Cumberland County. The incumbent is Democrat Richard Ojeda, who flipped the district and was elected with 51.1% of the vote in 2026.

=== Democratic primary ===
==== Potential ====
- Richard Ojeda, incumbent U.S. representative

== District 10 ==
The 10th district includes all of Catawba, Iredell, Lincoln, and Yadkin counties, as well as most of Forsyth County. The incumbent is Republican Pat Harrigan, who was re-elected with 49.6% of the vote in 2026.

=== Republican primary ===
==== Potential ====
- Pat Harrigan, incumbent U.S. representative

=== Democratic primary ===
==== Filed paperwork ====
- Ashley Bell, physician associate and nominee for this district in 2026
- West Caudle, entrepreneur and candidate for this district in 2026
- Marcus Pearson, educator and candidate for this district in 2026

== District 11 ==
The 11th district includes all of Avery, Buncombe, Cherokee, Clay, Graham, Haywood, Henderson, Jackson, Macon, Madison, McDowell, Mitchell, Swain, Transylvania, and Yancey counties, as well as portions of Polk County. The incumbent is Democrat Jamie Ager, who flipped the district and was elected with 57.1% of the vote in 2026.

=== Democratic primary ===
==== Potential ====
- Jamie Ager, incumbent U.S. representative

=== Republican primary ===
==== Declared ====
- Jennifer Balkcom, former state representative from the 117th district (2023–2027) and nominee for this district in 2026

== District 12 ==
The 12th district includes portions of central Mecklenburg County. The incumbent is Democrat Alma Adams, who was re-elected with 81.2% of the vote in 2026.

=== Democratic primary ===
==== Potential ====
- Alma Adams, incumbent U.S. representative

==== Filed paperwork ====
- Joseph Camille
- Treavor English

== District 13 ==
The 13th district includes all of Caswell, Franklin, Harnett, Johnston, Lee, and Person counties, as well as most of Granville County and portions of Wake County. The incumbent is Democrat Paul Barringer, who flipped the district and was elected with 50.5% of the vote in 2026.

=== Democratic primary ===
==== Filed paperwork ====
- Paul Barringer, incumbent U.S. representative

=== Republican primary ===
==== Filed paperwork ====
- Sid Sharma, accountant and candidate for this district in 2024 and 2026
- John Singleton

== District 14 ==
The 14th district includes all of Burke, Cleveland, Gaston, and Rutherford counties, as well as portions of Mecklenburg and Polk counties. The incumbent is Democrat LaKesha Womack, who flipped the district and was elected with 51.1% of the vote in 2026.

=== Democratic primary ===
==== Potential ====
- LaKesha Womack, incumbent U.S. representative

=== Republican primary ===
==== Publicly expressed interest ====
- Tim Moore, former U.S. representative from this district (2025–2027)

== See also ==
- 2028 United States Senate election in North Carolina
- 2028 United States presidential election in North Carolina
