= 2026 United States House of Representatives elections in North Carolina =

- November 3, 2026

All 14 North Carolina seats to the United States House of Representatives
	Majority party	Minority party
Party	Democratic	Republican
Last election	4	10
Seats won	11	3
Seat change	▲7	▼7
Popular vote	2,397,767	1,758,691
Percentage	56.96%	41.78%
Swing	▲14.16%	▼11.00%

Democratic hold Democratic gain
Republican hold
Democratic
40–50%
50–60%
60–70%
70–80%
80–90%
Republican
40–50%
50–60%
60–70%
70–80%

District lines to be used from the 2026 elections, per SB 249 passed by the North Carolina General Assembly on October 22, 2025 Interactive map version

The 2026 United States House of Representatives elections in North Carolina were held on November 3, 2026, to elect the 14 U.S. representatives from the state of North Carolina, one from each of the state's congressional districts. The elections coincided with other elections to the House of Representatives, elections to the United States Senate, and various state and local elections. The primary elections took place on March 3, 2026, and if there was races where no candidate receives over 30% in a primary, runoff elections would take place on May 12.

In the wake of the elections, the Democrats flipped seven House seats, including one rated as "solid" Republican and four rated as "likely" Republican by The Cook Political Report. They simultaneously held onto the 1st district, which Republicans targeted during a major mid-decade redistricting effort. This was the first time Democrats won a majority of U.S. House seats in North Carolina since 2010.

== Redistricting ==
=== Background ===
On October 13, 2025, the North Carolina General Assembly announced a plan to pass a new congressional map to help the GOP maintain its control in the United States House of Representatives for the 2026 elections as part of the broader 2025 U.S. redistricting cycle after Texas and Missouri had also passed new maps.

On October 21, 2025, the North Carolina Senate passed Senate Bill 249, which targeted the 1st district, the state's only competitive district, as well as the more heavily Republican-leaning 3rd district, with a party-line vote of 26-20. It passed in the House on October 22, 2025, with a party-line vote of 66-48, approved by the General Assembly without the signature of Governor Josh Stein, who did not have the authority to veto the congressional map. This was the first time in the modern era that North Carolina has redrawn maps mid-decade without being court-ordered to do so.

The new districts that Republicans drew with the intention of gaining an electoral advantage were unsuccessful in the general election, with Democrats' large numerical advantage breaking through several districts in which Republicans spread their voters thin in order to dilute Democratic influence within the state. Political analysts consider this to be a dummymander, which is when gerrymandered districts drawn in a particular party's favor backfire in an election.

=== Legal challenges ===
On October 31, 2025, the North Carolina State Conference of the NAACP, Common Cause, and individual plaintiffs filed motions to seek an injunction against the newly enacted congressional map to block its use for the 2026 United States House of Representatives elections, arguing that the new map linked to SB 249 violates multiple amendments and targets "the heart of the Black Belt." It was already challenged in its prior configuration as intentionally discriminatory, exacerbating the already-demonstrated vote dilution in NC-01 by massively reducing the district's Black voting-age population and eviscerating North Carolina's longstanding Black Belt district. An injunction was set for the November 19th deadline.

A three-judge panel later rejected the injunction to pause the implementation of the new map, ruling that the plaintiffs had not made a clear showing that they are likely to succeed on the merits of any of the claims advanced in their preliminary injunction motions and that they had not shown that their First Amendment claims and Fourteenth Amendment partisanship claim are likely to be justiciable, much less successful. The panel added that the direct evidence shows that partisanship, not race, motivated the reconfiguration of the districts, and that even if the new districts have a disparate impact on Black voters, that doesn't mean lawmakers acted with discriminatory intent.

In January 2026, the plaintiffs dropped the lawsuit.

== Statewide polling ==
=== Statewide congressional polls ===
Poll source	Date(s) administered	Sample size (Note: Key: A – all adults RV – registered voters LV – likely voters V – unclear)	Margin of error	Democratic	Republican	Other	Undecided
East Carolina University	September 29 – October 2, 2026	810 (LV)	± 4.0%	50%	46%	1% (Note: "A candidate from another party" with 1%)	4%
Catawba College/YouGov	September 4–15, 2026	885 (LV)	–	47%	38%	1% (Note: "I would not vote in this race" with 1%; "I would vote for another candidate" with 0%)	13%
New York Times/Siena University	June 15–27, 2026	601 (LV)	± 4.7%	49%	44%	–	6%
Harper Polling (R)	May 10–11, 2026	600 (LV)	± 4.0%	48%	43%	–	8%
Quantus Insights (R)	March 31 – April 1, 2026	987 (LV)	± 3.5%	45%	43%	3%	9%
High Point University/YouGov	March 26 – April 6, 2026	703 (LV)	± 4.3%	48%	44%	2% (Note: "Someone else/another party" with 2%)	7%
High Point University/YouGov	March 26 – April 6, 2026	800 (RV)	± 4.1%	47%	42%	2% (Note: "Someone else/another party" with 3%)	9%
Harper Polling (R)	March 22–23, 2025	600 (LV)	± 4.0%	48%	43%	–	7%
Catawba College/YouGov	March 9–18, 2026	1000 (LV) (Note: "Among North Carolina independents")	± 3.5%	44%	25%	–	27%
Change Research (D)	September 2–8, 2025	855 (LV)	± 3.6%	45%	42%	–	13%
Harper Polling (R)	August 11–12, 2025	600 (LV)	± 3.9%	46%	46%	–	8%

== Overview ==
Statewide results North Carolina elections to the US House of representatives, as of 16 November 2026:
Party	Candidates	Votes		Seats		
Party	Candidates	No.	%	No.	+/–	%
Democratic Party	14	2,397,767	56.96%	11	7	78.57%
Republican Party	14	1,758,691	41.78%	3	-7	21.43%
Libertarian party	9	49,593	1.18%	0		0%
Green Party	1	2,909	0.069%	0		0%
Independent and write-in	>1	535	0.013%	0		0%
Total valid vote		4,209,495	100.0%	14	-	100.0%
Spoiled or blank ballots						
Registered voters/turnout/voting-age population/registration rate						

== District 1 ==
North Carolina's 1st congressional district election
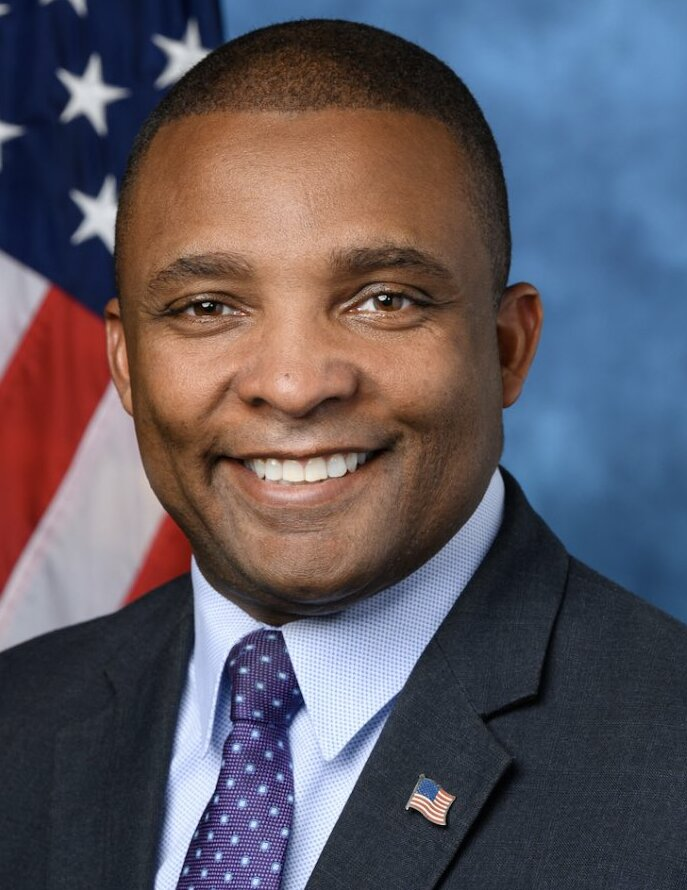

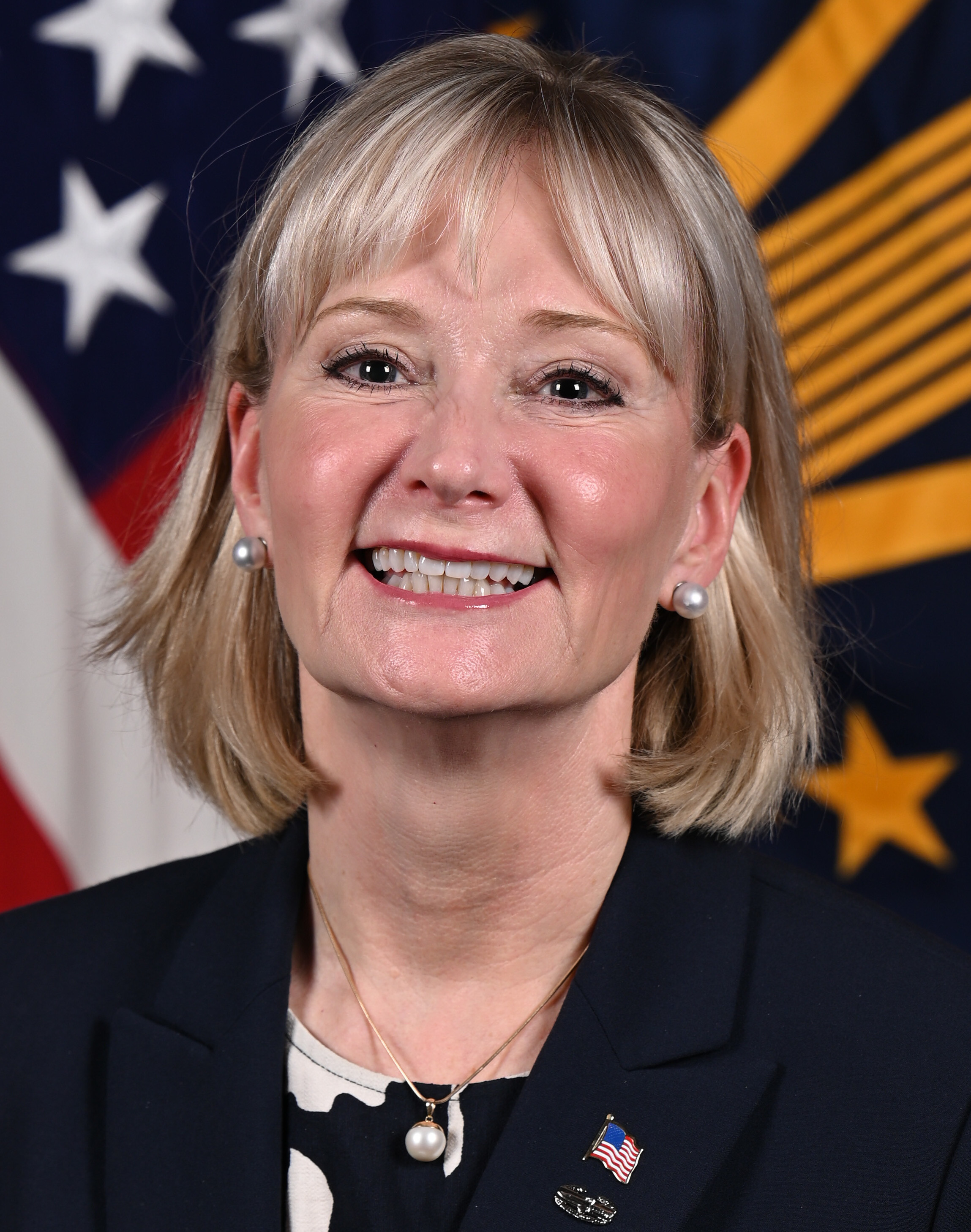
Nominee	Don Davis	Laurie Buckhout
Party	Democratic	Republican
Popular vote	157,483	146,684
Percentage	50.1%	46.7%
U.S. Representative before election
Don Davis
Democratic
Elected U.S. Representative
Don Davis
Democratic

North Carolina's 1st congressional district boundary from the 2026 elections Interactive map version

The 1st district was redrawn on October 22, 2025 to favor Republicans, now including all of Beaufort, Bertie, Camden, Carteret, Chowan, Craven, Currituck, Dare, Edgecombe, Gates, Halifax, Hertford, Hyde, Martin, Nash, Pamlico, Pasquotank, Perquimans, Tyrell, Vance, Warren, and Washington counties, as well as a small portion of eastern Granville County. The incumbent is Democrat Don Davis, who was re-elected with 49.5% of the vote in 2024.

The election was one of the most expensive congressional races in the 2026 elections, with over $38.8 million in spending.

=== Democratic primary ===
==== Nominee ====
- Don Davis, incumbent U.S. representative

==== Endorsements ====
Don Davis

U.S. representatives

- Seth Moulton, MA-06 (2015–present)

Labor unions

- Communications Workers of America (CWA)

Organizations

- AIPAC
- Animal Wellness Action
- Democratic Majority for Israel
- End Citizens United
- Jewish Democratic Council of America
- Joint Action Committee for Political Affairs
- VoteVets

==== Fundraising ====
Campaign finance reports as of March 31, 2026
Candidate	Raised	Spent	Cash on hand
Don Davis (D)	$3,232,086	$622,857	$2,880,071
Source: Federal Election Commission

=== Republican primary ===
==== Nominee ====
- Laurie Buckhout, former acting Assistant Secretary of Defense for Cyber Policy (2025) and nominee for this district in 2024

==== Eliminated in primary ====
- Asa Buck, Carteret County sheriff (2006–present)
- Bobby Hanig, state senator from the 1st district (2022–present)
- Eric Rouse, vice chair of the Lenoir County Commission and candidate for the 3rd district in 2019
- Ashley-Nicole Russell, attorney

==== Withdrawn ====
- Sandy Roberson, mayor of Rocky Mount (2019–present) and candidate for this district in 2022

==== Declined ====
- Greg Murphy, incumbent U.S. representative from the 3rd district (running in the 3rd district)
- Sandy Smith, farmer, nominee for this district in 2020 and 2022, and candidate in 2024

==== Endorsements ====
Laurie Buckhout

U.S. representatives

- Jack Bergman, MI-01 (2017–present)
- John McGuire, VA-05 (2025–present)
- Ryan Zinke, MT-01 (2015–2017, 2023–present)

Organizations

- Maggie's List
Sandy Roberson (withdrawn)

Executive branch officials

- ~~Laurie Buckhout, former acting Assistant Secretary of Defense for Cyber Policy (2025)~~ (entered race in December 2025)

==== Fundraising ====
Campaign finance reports as of March 31, 2026
Candidate	Raised	Spent	Cash on hand
Asa Buck (R)	$339,405	$309,045	$30,360
Laurie Buckhout (R)	$2,743,029	$1,285,714	$1,483,619
Bobby Hanig (R)	$361,096	$360,859	$237
Ashley-Nicole Russell (R)	$216,686	$215,602	$1,084
Source: Federal Election Commission

==== Polling ====
Poll source	Date(s) administered	Sample size	Margin of error	Asa Buck	Laurie Buckhout	Bobby Hanig	Eric Rouse	Other	Undecided
Emerson College (Note: Poll sponsored by WNCT-TV, WNCN, and Nexstar Media)	February 6–8, 2026	500 (LV)	± 4.3%	22%	26%	11%	5%	1% (Note: Ashley-Nicole Russell with 1%)	35%

==== Results ====
Republican primary results
Party	Candidate	Votes	%
Republican	Laurie Buckhout	26,624	39.5
Republican	Asa Buck	23,227	34.5
Republican	Bobby Hanig	10,924	16.2
Republican	Eric Rouse	3,626	5.4
Republican	Ashley-Nicole Russell	2,975	4.4
Total votes		67,376	100.0

=== Libertarian primary ===
==== Nominee ====
- Tom Bailey, contractor, former chair of the Guilford County Libertarian Party, and perennial candidate

=== Independents ===
==== Disqualified ====
- Pamela Jenkins-Gaylord
- Jamie Noble, candidate for Mayor of Elizabeth City in 2025 (write-in)

=== General election ===
==== Predictions ====
Source	Ranking	As of
Decision Desk HQ	Lean D	October 30, 2026
The Cook Political Report	Tossup	October 9, 2026
Inside Elections	Tilt D	October 29, 2026
Sabato's Crystal Ball	Lean D	October 20, 2026

==== Post-primary endorsements ====
Don Davis (D)

Statewide officials

- Mikie Sherrill, governor of New Jersey (2026–present)

Individuals

- Matthew Yglesias, journalist

Labor unions

- American Federation of Government Employees (AFGE)
- North Carolina State AFL-CIO
- United Auto Workers

Organizations

- Black Economic Alliance PAC
- Feminist Majority Foundation PAC
- Joint Action Committee for Political Affairs (JPAC)
- Leadership Now Project
Laurie Buckhout (R)

Executive branch officials

- Donald Trump, president of the United States (2017–2021, 2025–present)

U.S. representatives

- Richard Hudson, NC-09 (2013–present)

Organizations

- NRCC MAGA Majority
- Steak 'n Shake

==== Fundraising ====
Campaign finance reports as of October 14, 2026
Candidate	Raised	Spent	Cash on hand
Don Davis (D)	$5,805,482	$5,250,506	$825,818
Laurie Buckhout (R)	$4,787,737	$3,376,140	$1,437,901
Tom Bailey (L)	$0	$0	$0
Source: Federal Election Commission

==== Polling ====
Poll source	Date(s) administered	Sample size	Margin of error	Don Davis (D)	Laurie Buckhout (R)	Tom Bailey (L)	Other	Undecided
RedBox Research (D) (Note: Poll sponsored by A Fight Worth Having)	October 20-23, 2026	1,468 (LV)	± 3.6%	45%	44%	2%	4% (Note: "Prefer not to answer" with 3%; "Someone else" with 1%)	5%
co/efficient (R) (Note: Poll sponsored by Buckout's campaign)	October 6–8, 2026	623 (LV)	± 3.91%	42%	43%	2%	–	13%
Neighborhood Research (R) (Note: Poll commissioned by Rick Shaftan, who supports Buckout's campaign)	October 1–6, 2026	303 (LV)	± 5.6%	51%	41%	–	–	8%
GQR (D) (Note: Poll sponsored by Davis' campaign)	September 29 – October 4, 2026	500 (LV)	—	47%	39%	8%	–	6%
GBAO (D) (Note: Poll commissioned by the House Majority PAC, which is focused on electing Democrats to the U.S. House of Representatives)	September 8–11, 2026	500 (LV)	—	50%	43%	–	–	7%
GQR (D)	June 22–28, 2026	500 (LV)	–	45%	41%	8%	–	6%
co/efficient (R) (Note: Poll commissioned by the National Republican Congressional Committee)	April 25–29, 2026	842 (LV)	± 3.4%	41%	41%	–	–	18%
GQR (D)	January 29 – February 2, 2026	500 (LV)	–	42%	39%	9%	1% (Note: "Someone else" with 1%)	9%

Hypothetical polling

Generic Democrat vs generic Republican

Poll source	Date(s) administered	Sample size	Margin of error	Generic Democrat	Generic Republican	Undecided
co/efficient (R)	October 6–8, 2026	623 (LV)	± 3.91%	45%	46%	9% (Note: "Third party" with 1%)
co/efficient (R)	April 25–29, 2026	842 (LV)	± 3.4%	42%	46%	12%
GQR (D)	January 29 – February 2, 2026	500 (LV)	–	43%	47%	10%

==== Results ====
2026 North Carolina's 1st congressional district election
Party	Candidate	Votes	%	±%
Democratic	Don Davis (incumbent)	157,483	50.1%	
Republican	Laurie Buckhout	146,684	46.7%	
Libertarian	Tom Bailey	9,944	3.1%	
Total votes		314,111	100.0%	

== District 2 ==
North Carolina's 2nd congressional district election
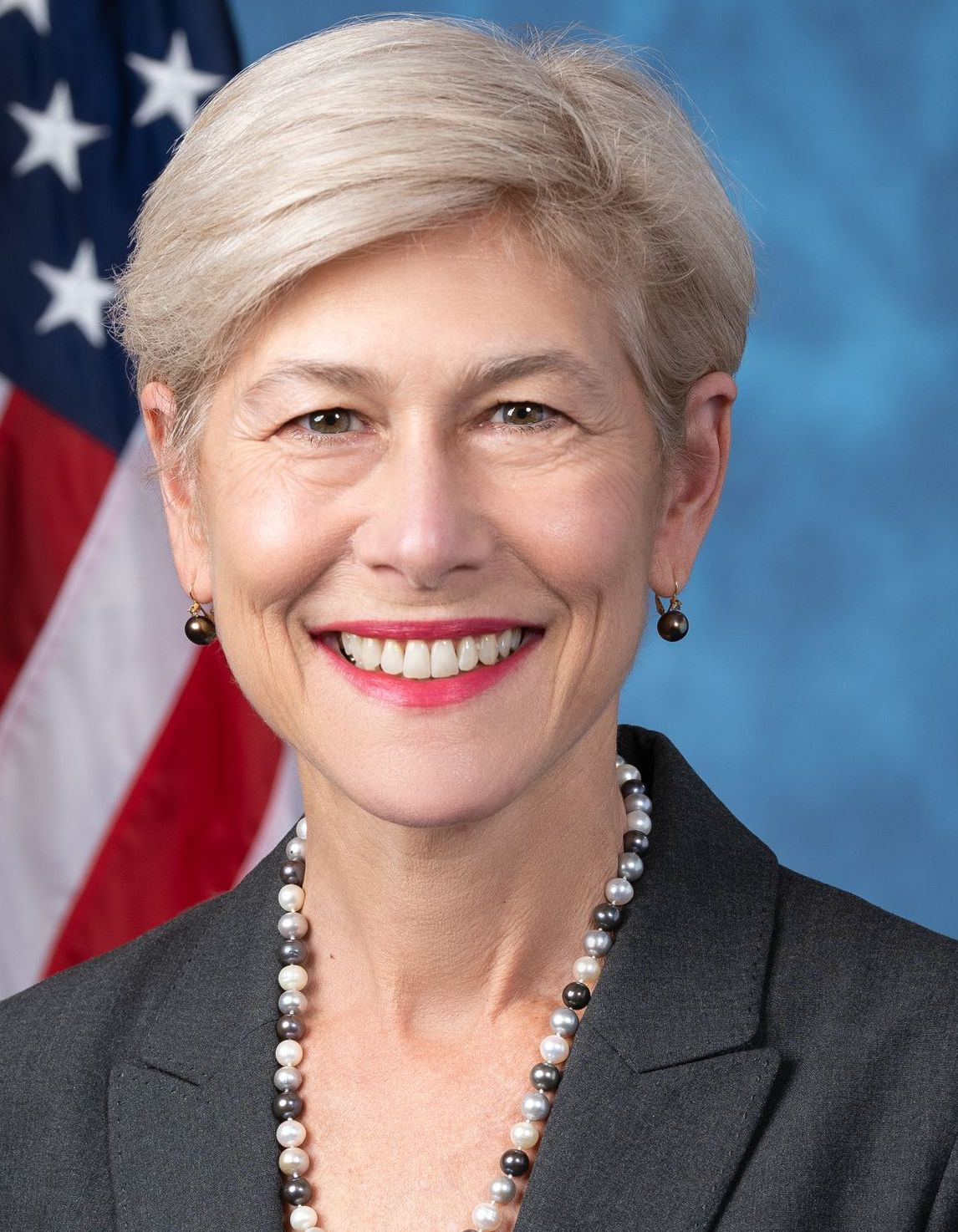

Nominee	Deborah Ross	Gene Douglass
Party	Democratic	Republican
Popular vote	246,446	76,976
Percentage	75.0%	23.4%
U.S. Representative before election
Deborah Ross
Democratic
Elected U.S. Representative
Deborah Ross
Democratic

The 2nd district encompasses portions of central Wake County. The incumbent is Democrat Deborah Ross, who was re-elected with 66.3% of the vote in 2024.

=== Democratic primary ===
==== Nominee ====
- Deborah Ross, incumbent U.S. representative

==== Withdrawn ====
- Rob Bennett, energy policy analyst

==== Endorsements ====
Deborah Ross

Labor unions

- Communications Workers of America (CWA)

Organizations

- Jewish Democratic Council of America
- League of Conservation Voters
- National Organization for Women PAC
- Planned Parenthood Action Fund
- Population Connection
- Sierra Club

==== Fundraising ====
Campaign finance reports as of March 31, 2026
Candidate	Raised	Spent	Cash on hand
Deborah Ross (D)	$1,419,040	$802,867	$1,353,684
Source: Federal Election Commission

=== Republican primary ===
==== Nominee ====
- Gene Douglass, professor and candidate for this district in 2024

=== Libertarian primary ===
==== Nominee ====
- Matt Laszacs, business director and nominee for North Carolina's 14th Senate district in 2022 and North Carolina's 41st House district in 2024

=== Independent ===
==== Candidates ====
- Brian McGinnis, anti-war activist, Marine veteran, and firefighter (write-in)

=== General election ===
==== Predictions ====
Source	Ranking	As of
Decision Desk HQ	Safe D	July 14, 2026
The Cook Political Report	Solid D	February 6, 2025
Inside Elections	Solid D	March 7, 2025
Sabato's Crystal Ball	Safe D	April 10, 2025

==== Post-primary endorsements ====
Deborah Ross (D)

Labor unions

- United Auto Workers

Organizations

- Black Economic Alliance PAC
- Equality North Carolina
- Feminist Majority Foundation PAC
- Giffords
- Joint Action Committee for Political Affairs (JAC)
- National Association of Social Workers
- National Organization for Women
- National Women's Political Caucus

==== Fundraising ====
Campaign finance reports as of September 30, 2026
Candidate	Raised	Spent	Cash on hand
Deborah Ross (D)	$1,969,791	$1,351,530	$1,355,772
Gene Douglass	$0	$0	$0
Matt Laszacs	$0	$0	$0
Brian McGinnis (WI)	$72,695	$27,863	$45,614
Source: Federal Election Commission

==== Results ====
2026 North Carolina's 2nd congressional district election
Party	Candidate	Votes	%	±%
Democratic	Deborah Ross (incumbent)	246,446	75.0%	
Republican	Gene Douglass	76,976	23.4%	
Libertarian	Matt Laszacs	4,299	1.3%	
None	Brian McGinnis (Write-in)	270	0.1%	
Write-in		265	0.1%	
Total votes		328,256	100.0%	

== District 3 ==
North Carolina's 3rd congressional district election
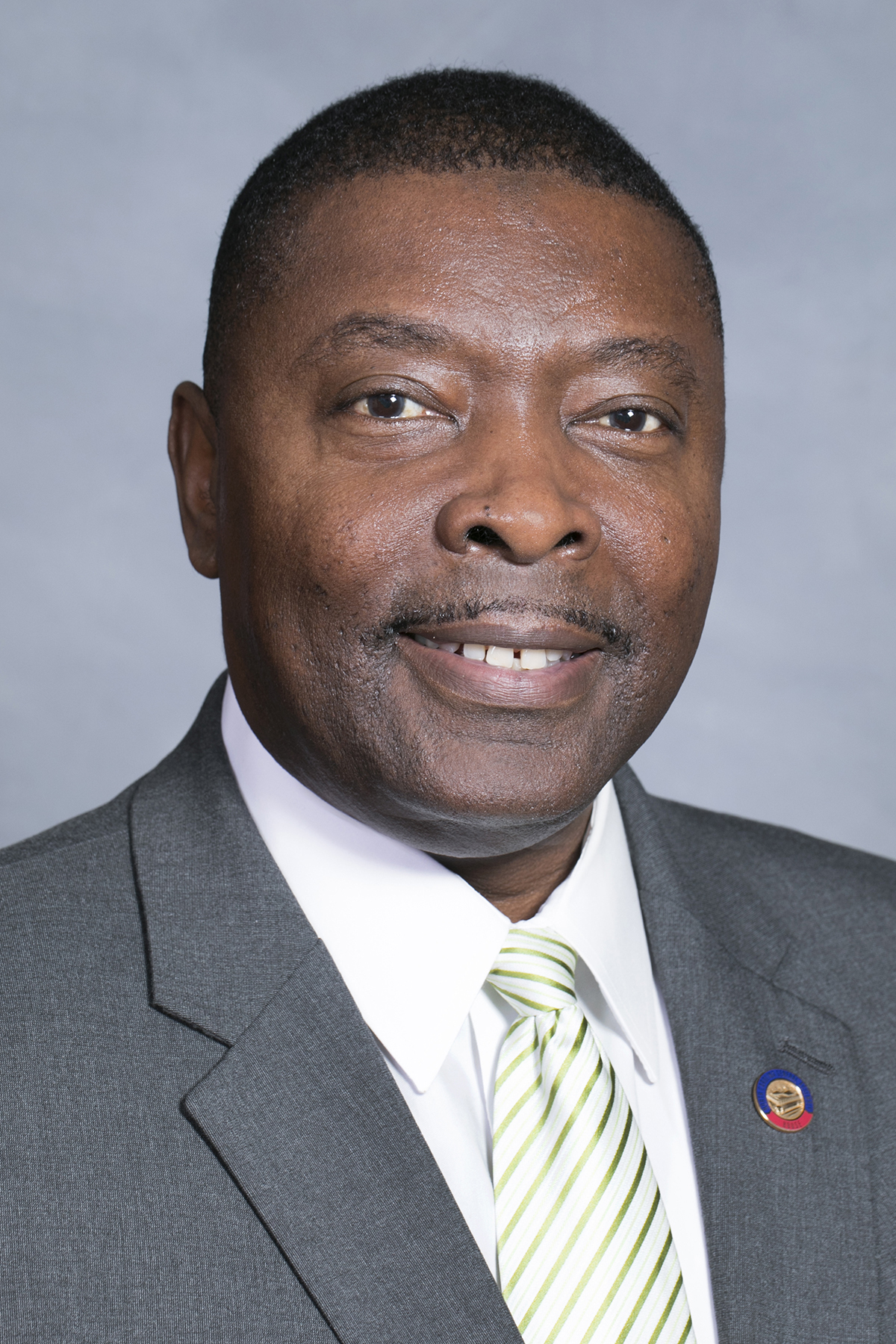

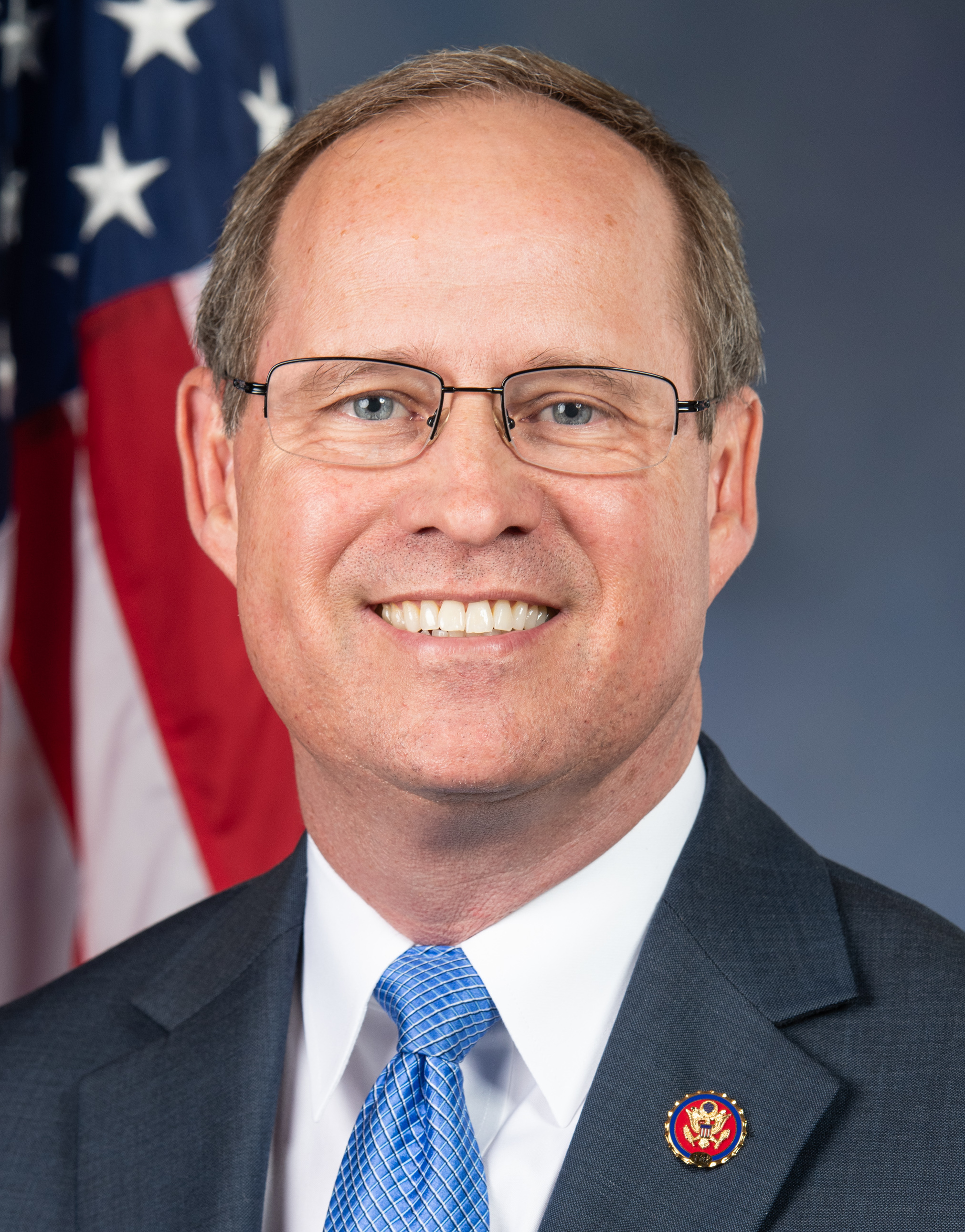
Nominee	Raymond Smith Jr.	Greg Murphy
Party	Democratic	Republican
Popular vote	118,434	118,176
Percentage	49.4%	49.3%
U.S. Representative before election
Greg Murphy
Republican
Elected U.S. Representative
Raymond Smith Jr.
Democratic

North Carolina's 3rd congressional district boundary from the 2026 elections Interactive map version

The 3rd district was redrawn on October 22, 2025 and now includes all of Duplin, Greene, Lenoir, Jones, Onslow, Pitt, Wayne, and Wilson counties, as well as most of Sampson County. The incumbent is Republican Greg Murphy, who was re-elected with 77.4% of the vote in 2024.

=== Republican primary ===
==== Nominee ====
- Greg Murphy, incumbent U.S. representative

==== Endorsements ====
Greg Murphy

Executive branch officials

- Donald Trump, 45th and 47th president of the United States (2017–2021, 2025–present)

Organizations

- AIPAC

==== Fundraising ====
Campaign finance reports as of March 31, 2026
Candidate	Raised	Spent	Cash on hand
Greg Murphy (R)	$1,968,152	$903,815	$2,647,799
Source: Federal Election Commission

=== Democratic primary ===
==== Nominee ====
- Raymond Smith Jr., former state representative from the 21st district (2019–2023), and candidate for North Carolina's 4th Senate district in 2022 and nominee in 2024

==== Eliminated in primary ====
- Allison Jaslow, non-profit executive and veteran

==== Disqualified ====
- George Papastrat, businessman and Republican candidate for this district in 2022
- Chris Schulte, professor and nominee for North Carolina's 15th House district in 2022 and 2024

==== Declined ====
- Don Davis, incumbent U.S. representative from the 1st district (running in the 1st district)

==== Endorsements ====
Allison Jaslow

U.S. representatives

- Lois Frankel, FL-22 (2013–2017, 2025–present)

Organizations

- Elect Democratic Women
- Joint Action Committee for Political Affairs
Raymond Smith Jr.

Labor unions

- Communications Workers of America (CWA)

Organizations

- Congressional Black Caucus PAC
- Red Wine & Blue
- VoteVets
- Young Democrats of North Carolina

==== Fundraising ====
Campaign finance reports as of March 31, 2026
Candidate	Raised	Spent	Cash on hand
Allison Jaslow (D)	$273,731	$273,731	$0
Raymond Smith Jr. (D)	$115,667	$68,461	$41,091
Source: Federal Election Commission

==== Results ====
Democratic primary results
Party	Candidate	Votes	%
Democratic	Raymond Smith Jr.	23,552	56.7
Democratic	Allison Jaslow	18,020	43.3
Total votes		41,572	100.0

=== Libertarian primary ===
==== Nominee ====
- Daniel Cavender, technician and nominee for North Carolina's 30th Senate district in 2024

==== Disqualified ====
- Austin Ayers, entrepreneur

=== General election ===
==== Predictions ====
Source	Ranking	As of
Decision Desk HQ	Lean R	October 30, 2026
The Cook Political Report	Likely R	October 23, 2026
Inside Elections	Likely R	October 29, 2026
Sabato's Crystal Ball	Likely R	September 29, 2026

==== Post-primary endorsements ====
Raymond Smith Jr (D)

U.S. representatives

- Greg Stanton, AZ-04 (2019–present)

Labor unions

- United Auto Workers

Organizations

- Collective PAC
- Democrats Abroad
- NewDem Action Fund

==== Fundraising ====
Campaign finance reports as of October 14, 2026
Candidate	Raised	Spent	Cash on hand
Greg Murphy (R)	$2,897,749	$2,225,520	$2,255,691
Raymond Smith Jr. (D)	$366,581	$321,979	$44,282
Daniel Cavender (L)	$0	$0	$0
Source: Federal Election Commission

==== Polling ====
Poll source	Date(s) administered	Sample size	Margin of error	Greg Murphy (R)	Raymond Smith Jr.(D)	Undecided
Tulchin Research (D)	July 27 – August 2, 2026	600 (LV)	± 4.0%	44%	41%	15%

==== Results ====
2026 North Carolina's 3rd congressional district election
Party	Candidate	Votes	%	±%
Democratic	Raymond Smith Jr.	118,434	49.4%	
Republican	Greg Murphy (incumbent)	118,176	49.3%	
Libertarian	Daniel Cavender	3,004	1.2%	
Total votes		239,614	100.0%	
Democratic gain from Republican				

== District 4 ==
North Carolina's 4th congressional district election
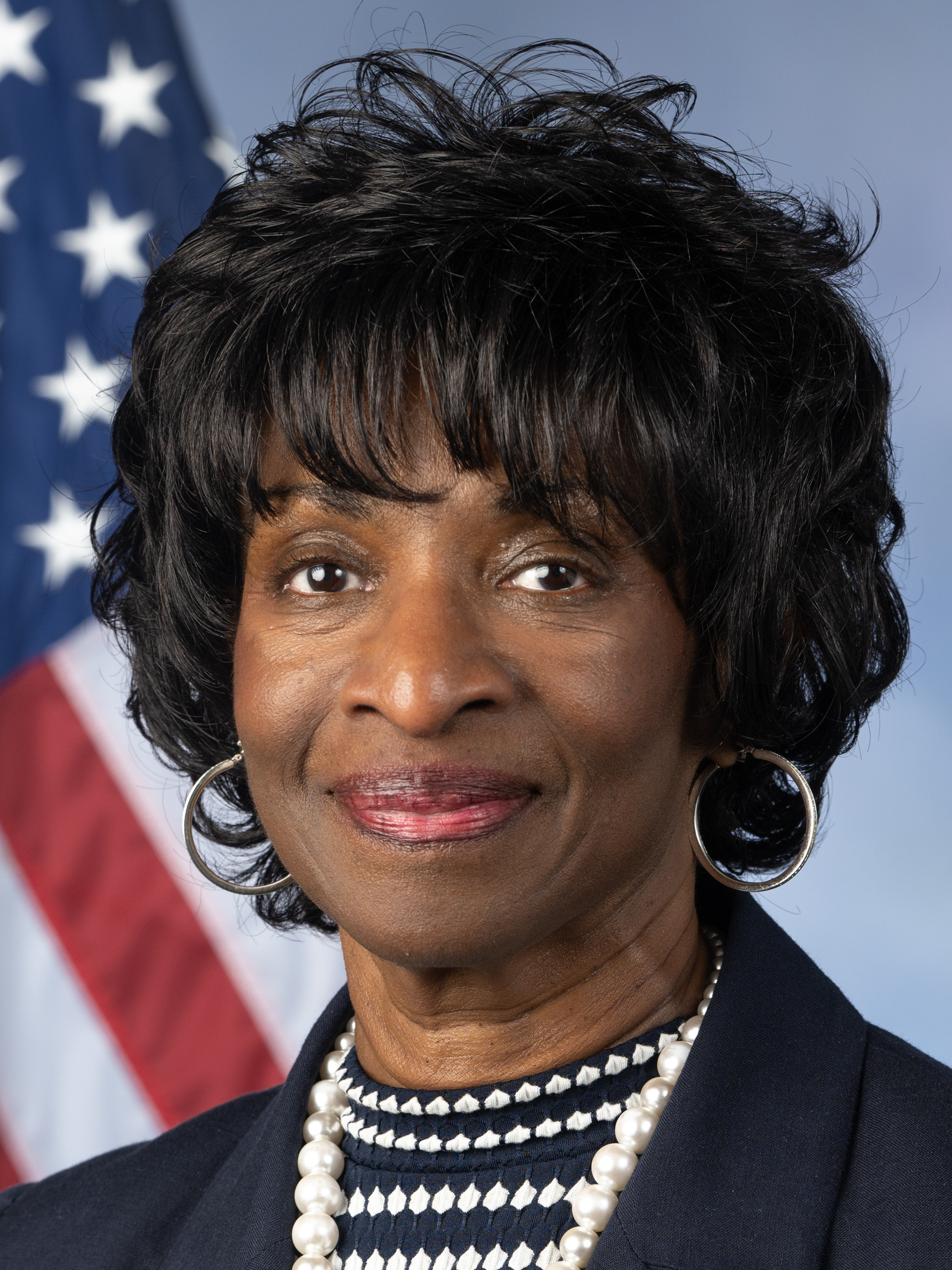

Nominee	Valerie Foushee	Max Ganorkar
Party	Democratic	Republican
Popular vote	284,548	68,019
Percentage	79.1%	18.9%
- Foushee: 60–70% 70–80% 80–90%
U.S. Representative before election
Valerie Foushee
Democratic
Elected U.S. Representative
Valerie Foushee
Democratic

The 4th district includes all of Durham and Orange counties, as well as portions of northern Chatham and eastern Wake counties. The incumbent is Democrat Valerie Foushee, who was re-elected with 71.9% of the vote in 2024.

=== Democratic primary ===
==== Nominee ====
- Valerie Foushee, incumbent U.S. representative

==== Eliminated in primary ====
- Nida Allam, Durham County Commissioner (2020–present) and candidate for this district in 2022
- Mary Patterson, HR professional and business analyst

==== Endorsements ====
Endorsements in bold were made after the primary elections.

Nida Allam

U.S. senators

- Bernie Sanders, Vermont (2007–present) (Independent)

State legislators

- Julie von Haefen, state representative from the 36th district (2019–present)
- Marcia Morey, state representative from the 30th district (2017–present)

Party officials

- David Hogg, former vice chair of the Democratic National Committee (2025)

Notable individuals

- Clay Aiken, American Idol runner-up, activist, candidate for this district in 2022 and nominee for NC-02 in 2014

Organizations

- American Priorities
- College Democrats at NC State
- College Democrats of America
- Justice Democrats
- Leaders We Deserve
- Our Revolution
- Progressive Democrats of America
- Progressive Victory
- Sunrise Movement
- Track AIPAC
- Young Democrats of North Carolina

Political parties

- Working Families Party

Newspapers

- The Daily Tar Heel
Valerie Foushee

U.S. representatives

- Alma Adams, NC-12 (2014–present)
- G. K. Butterfield, NC-01 (2004–2022)
- Don Davis, NC-01 (2023–present)
- Maxwell Frost, FL-10 (2023–present)
- Pramila Jayapal, WA-07 (2017–present)
- Greg Meeks, NY-05 (1998–present)
- David Price, NC-04 (1987–1995, 1997–2023)
- Deborah Ross, NC-02 (2021–present)
- Marilyn Strickland, WA-10 (2021–present)

Statewide officials

- Cheri Beasley, former chief justice of the North Carolina Supreme Court (2019–2020)
- Roy Cooper, former Governor of North Carolina (2017–2025) and Attorney General of North Carolina (2001-2017)
- Wes Moore, Governor of Maryland (2023-present)
- Josh Stein, Governor of North Carolina (2025-present) and former Attorney General of North Carolina (2017-2025)
- Patricia Timmons-Goodson, former associate justice of the North Carolina Supreme Court (2006–2012)

State legislators

- Gale Adcock, state senator from the 16th district (2023–present)
- Vernetta Alston, state representative from the 29th district (2020–present)
- Dan Blue, former minority leader of the North Carolina Senate (2014–2025) from the 14th district (2009–present)
- Allen Buansi, state representative from the 56th district (2022–present)
- Maria Cervania, state representative from the 41st district (2023–present)
- Jay Chaudhuri, minority whip of the North Carolina Senate (2019–present) from the 15th district (2016–present)
- Allison Dahle, state representative from the 11th district (2019–present)
- Zack Forde-Hawkins, state representative from the 31st district (2019–present)
- Lisa Grafstein, state senator from the 13th district (2023–present)
- Ray Jeffers, state representative from the 2nd district (2023–present)
- Ya Liu, state representative from the 21st district (2023–present)
- Natalie Murdock, state senator from the 20th district (2020–present)
- Renee Price, state representative from the 50th district (2023–present)
- Robert Reives, minority leader of the North Carolina House of Representatives (2021–present) from the 54th district (2014–present)
- Mike Woodard, former state senator from the 22nd district (2013–2025)

Local officials

- Cheryl Stallings, Wake County commissioner from the 3rd district (2022–present)
- Leonardo Williams, mayor of Durham (2023–present)
- 7 Orange County commissioners
- 3 county sheriffs

Labor unions

- American Federation of Government Employees

Organizations

- ASPIRE PAC
- Congressional Progressive Caucus
- League of Conservation Voters
- National Organization for Women PAC
- Planned Parenthood Action Fund
- Public First Action
- Sierra Club

Newspapers

- The News & Observer (Democratic primary only)

==== Fundraising ====
Campaign finance reports as of March 31, 2026
Candidate	Raised	Spent	Cash on hand
Nida Allam (D)	$1,120,856	$1,024,277	$96,579
Valerie Foushee (D)	$823,413	$878,567	$30,541
Source: Federal Election Commission

==== Results ====
Results by county: Foushee: 50–60%; 60–70%; Allam: 40–50%; 50–60%

Results by precinct: Foushee: 40–50%; 50–60%; 60–70%; 70–80%; Allam: 40-50%; 50-60%; 60-70%; 70-80%

Democratic primary results
Party	Candidate	Votes	%
**Democratic**	**Valerie Foushee (incumbent)**	**61,776**	**49.2**
Democratic	Nida Allam	60,605	48.2
Democratic	Mary Patterson	3,274	2.6
Total votes		**125,655**	**100.0**

=== Republican primary ===
==== Nominee ====
- Max Ganorkar, home building contractor and perennial candidate

==== Fundraising ====
Campaign finance reports as of March 31, 2026
Candidate	Raised	Spent	Cash on hand
Max Ganorkar (R)	$5,531	$3,485	$17,399
Source: Federal Election Commission

=== Libertarian primary ===
==== Nominee ====
- Guy Meilleur, arborist and perennial candidate

=== Independents ===
==== Disqualified ====
- Demerius Smith, marketing specialist

=== General election ===
==== Predictions ====
Source	Ranking	As of
Decision Desk HQ	Safe D	July 14, 2026
The Cook Political Report	Solid D	February 6, 2025
Inside Elections	Solid D	March 7, 2025
Sabato's Crystal Ball	Safe D	April 10, 2025

==== Post-primary endorsements ====
Valerie Foushee (D)

Labor unions

- United Auto Workers

Organizations

- Collective PAC
- Equality North Carolina
- Giffords
- J Street

==== Fundraising ====
Campaign finance reports as of October 14, 2026
Candidate	Raised	Spent	Cash on hand
Valerie Foushee (D)	$1,048,543	$1,084,884	$49,354
Max Ganorkar (R)	$18,568	$24,920	$9,001
Guy Meilleur (L)	$0	$0	$0
Source: Federal Election Commission

==== Results ====
2026 North Carolina's 4th congressional district election
Party	Candidate	Votes	%	±%
**Democratic**	**Valerie Foushee (incumbent)**	**284,548**	**79.1%**	
Republican	Max Ganorkar	68,019	18.9%	
Libertarian	Guy Meilleur	7,004	1.9%	
Total votes		**359,571**	**100.0%**	

== District 5 ==
North Carolina's 5th congressional district election

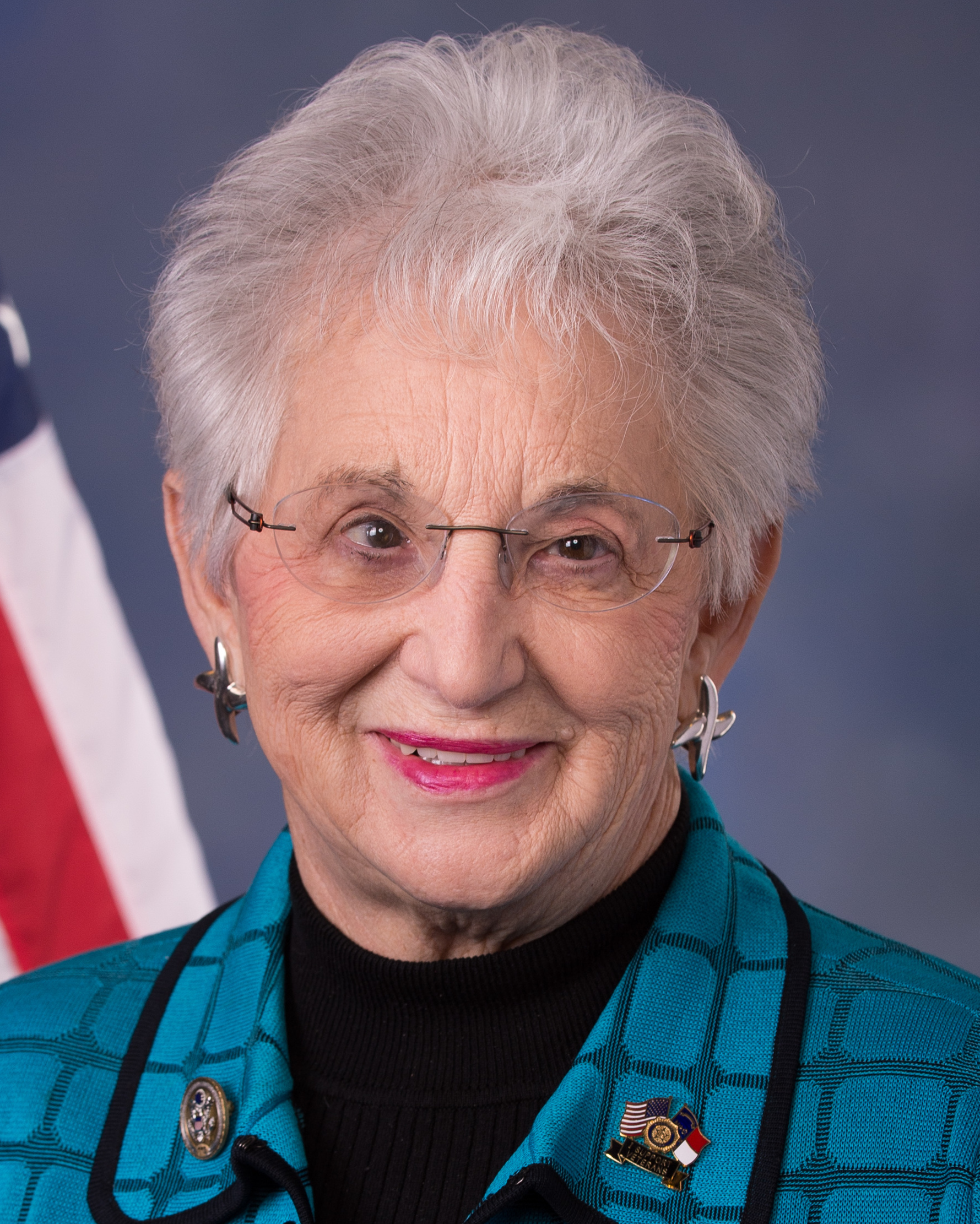
Nominee	Chuck Hubbard	Virginia Foxx
Party	Democratic	Republican
Popular vote	139,769	139,439
Percentage	48.7%	48.6%
- Hubbard: 60–70% 70–80% Foxx: 50–60% 60–70% 70–80%
U.S. Representative before election
Virginia Foxx
Republican
Elected U.S. Representative
Chuck Hubbard
Democratic

The 5th district includes all of Alexander, Alleghany, Ashe, Caldwell, Rockingham, Stokes, Surry, Watauga, and Wilkes counties, as well as portions of Guilford County. The incumbent is Republican Virginia Foxx, who was re-elected with 59.5% of the vote in 2024.

=== Republican primary ===
==== Nominee ====
- Virginia Foxx, incumbent U.S. representative

==== Eliminated in primary ====
- Steve Girard, adjunct professor and activist
- Joey Osborne, business owner and candidate for North Carolina's 11th congressional district in 2020
- Chad Williams, home inspector

==== Declined ====
- Kevin Berger, chair of the Rockingham County board of commissioners and son of state senator Phil Berger

==== Endorsements ====
Virginia Foxx

Executive branch officials

- Donald Trump, 45th and 47th president of the United States (2017–2021, 2025–present)

Organizations

- AIPAC
- Maggie's List

==== Fundraising ====
Campaign finance reports as of March 31, 2026
Candidate	Raised	Spent	Cash on hand
Virginia Foxx (R)	$1,409,022	$1,073,521	$3,246,770
Source: Federal Election Commission

==== Results ====
Republican primary results
Party	Candidate	Votes	%
Republican	Virginia Foxx (incumbent)	53,627	74.5
Republican	Joey Osborne	7,934	11.0
Republican	Steve Girard	6,404	8.9
Republican	Roman "Chad" Williams	3,979	5.5
Total votes		71,944	100.0

=== Democratic primary ===
==== Nominee ====
- Chuck Hubbard, retired newspaper reporter and nominee for this district in 2024

==== Eliminated in primary ====
- Kyah Creekmore, retail worker and activist

==== Endorsements ====
Kyah Creekmore

Organizations

- Democratic Socialists of America Winston-Salem
- Track AIPAC
Chuck Hubbard

U.S. representatives

- Kathy Manning, former NC-06 (2021–2025)

Organizations

- Young Democrats of North Carolina

==== Fundraising ====
Campaign finance reports as of March 31, 2026
Candidate	Raised	Spent	Cash on hand
Kyah Creekmore (D)	$7,430	$6,602	$837
Chuck Hubbard (D)	$248,618	$244,388	$11,627
Source: Federal Election Commission

==== Results ====
Democratic primary results
Party	Candidate	Votes	%
Democratic	Chuck Hubbard	25,655	56.7
Democratic	Kyah Creekmore	19,585	43.3
Total votes		45,240	100.0

=== Libertarian primary ===
==== Nominee ====
- Robert Luffman, truck driver

=== Independents ===
==== Withdrawn ====
- David Clayton, digital marketing consultant

==== Disqualified ====
- Shatarra Smith, realtor (write-in)

==== Fundraising ====
Italics indicate withdrawn candidate

Campaign finance reports as of March 31, 2026
Candidate	Raised	Spent	Cash on hand
David Clayton (I)	$70,206	$58,307	$11,899
Source: Federal Election Commission

=== General election ===
During the general election campaign, Foxx faced criticism for her response to a letter sent by a 10 year-old. A fourth grade student in Greensboro had written to Foxx advocating for an electric vehicle tax credit as part of a school assignment to write a persuasive essay and send it to a change-maker. Foxx's letter in response, accusing the teacher of indoctrinating and directing the 10 year-old to right-wing news outlets, was criticised.

==== Predictions ====
Source	Ranking	As of
Decision Desk HQ	Likely R	July 14, 2026
The Cook Political Report	Likely R	October 30, 2026
Inside Elections	Solid R	March 7, 2025
Sabato's Crystal Ball	Safe R	April 10, 2025

==== Post-primary endorsements ====
Chuck Hubbard (D)

Organizations

- Equality North Carolina

==== Fundraising ====
Italics indicate withdrawn candidate

Campaign finance reports as of October 14, 2026
Candidate	Raised	Spent	Cash on hand
Virginia Foxx (R)	$2,189,052	$1,610,250	$3,490,070
Chuck Hubbard (D)	$863,260	$718,646	$152,010
Robert Luffman (L)	$0	$0	$0
David Clayton (I)	$70,490	$61,429	$9,061
Source: Federal Election Commission

==== Results ====
2026 North Carolina's 5th congressional district election
Party	Candidate	Votes	%	±%
Democratic	Chuck Hubbard	139,769	48.7%	
Republican	Virginia Foxx (incumbent)	139,439	48.6%	
Libertarian	Robert Luffman	7,578	2.6%	
Total votes		286,786	100.0%	

== District 6 ==
North Carolina's 6th congressional district election

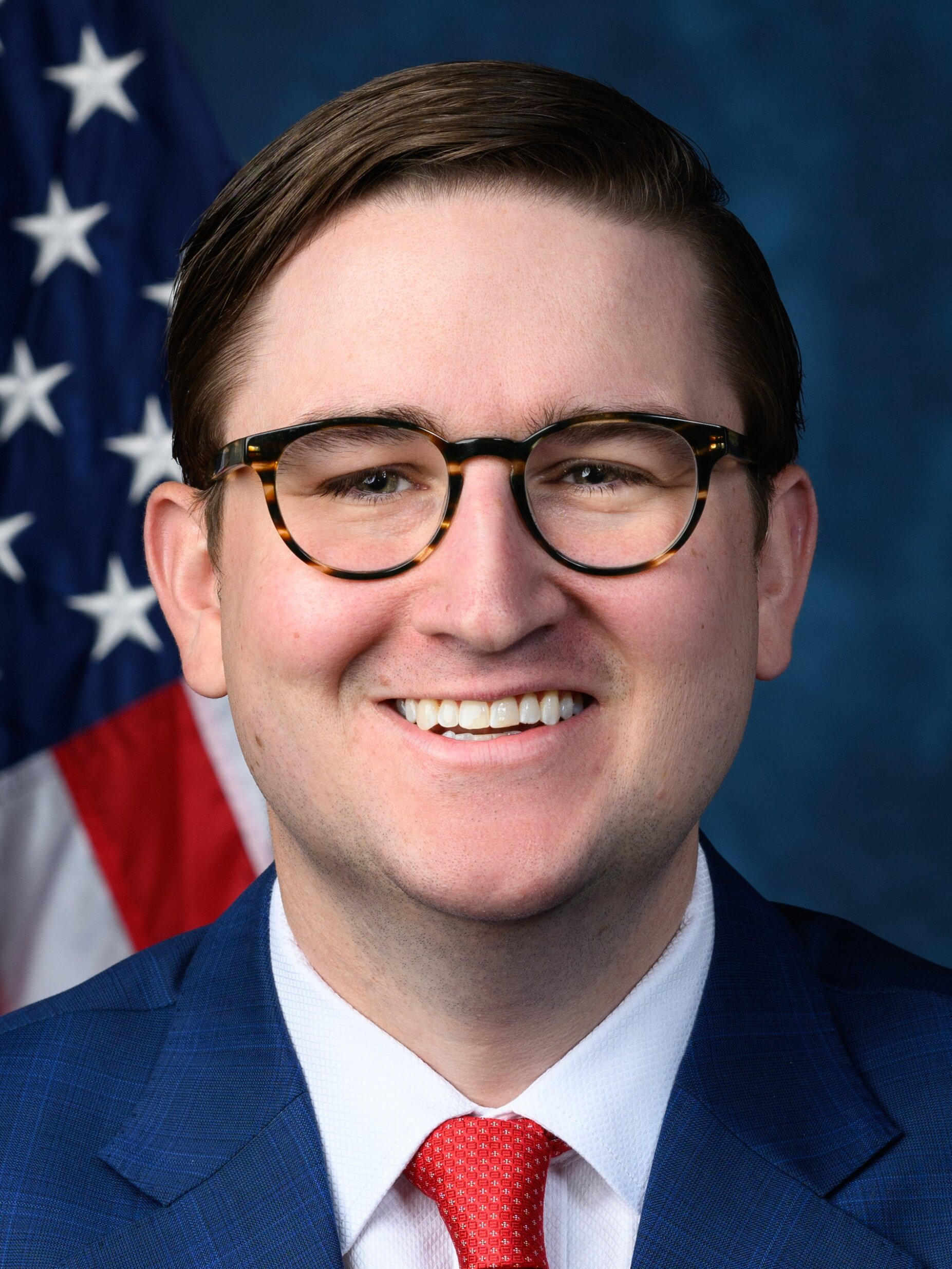
Nominee	Cyril Jefferson	Addison McDowell
Party	Democratic	Republican
Popular vote	140,707	134,103
Percentage	51.2%	48.8%
- Jefferson: 50–60% 60–70% 70–80% McDowell: 50–60% 60–70%
U.S. Representative before election
Addison McDowell
Republican
Elected U.S. Representative
Cyril Jefferson
Democratic

The 6th district includes all of Davidson, Davie, and Rowan counties, as well as portions of northwestern Cabarrus County, eastern Forsyth County, and southwestern Guilford County. The incumbent is Republican Addison McDowell, who was elected with 69.2% of the vote in 2024.

=== Republican primary ===
==== Nominee ====
- Addison McDowell, incumbent U.S. representative

==== Endorsements ====
Addison McDowell

Executive branch officials

- Donald Trump, 45th and 47th president of the United States (2017–2021, 2025–present)

Organizations

- AIPAC

==== Fundraising ====
Campaign finance reports as of March 31, 2026
Candidate	Raised	Spent	Cash on hand
Addison McDowell (R)	$1,005,833	$735,385	$277,771
Source: Federal Election Commission

=== Democratic primary ===
==== Nominee ====
- Cyril Jefferson, mayor of High Point

==== Eliminated in primary ====
- Beau Blair, bartender
- Keith Davenport, former mayor of Brooksville, Oklahoma
- Alysa Kassay, federal employee

==== Disqualified ====
- Tavin Felton-Stackhouse, project manager and political organizer

==== Endorsements ====
Cyril Jefferson

Organizations

- Vote Common Good

==== Fundraising ====
Campaign finance reports as of March 31, 2026
Candidate	Raised	Spent	Cash on hand
Beau Blair (D)	$27,987	$24,708	$3,662
Keith Davenport (D)	$12,486	$2,095	$10,159
Cyril Jefferson (D)	$157,869	$154,710	$3,159
Alysa Kassay (D)	$46,186	$52,899	$23
Source: Federal Election Commission

==== Results ====
Democratic primary results
Party	Candidate	Votes	%
Democratic	Cyril Jefferson	15,274	39.2
Democratic	Alysa Kassay	13,316	34.1
Democratic	Keith Davenport	6,569	16.8
Democratic	Beau Blair	3,848	9.9
Total votes		39,007	100.0

=== Independents ===
==== Disqualified ====
- Josh Hager, healthcare worker

=== General election ===
==== Predictions ====
Source	Ranking	As of
Decision Desk HQ	Likely R	July 14, 2026
The Cook Political Report	Solid R	February 6, 2025
Inside Elections	Solid R	March 7, 2025
Sabato's Crystal Ball	Safe R	April 10, 2025

==== Post-primary endorsements ====
Addison McDowell (R)

Organizations

- U.S. Chamber of Commerce

==== Fundraising ====
Campaign finance reports as of October 14, 2026
Candidate	Raised	Spent	Cash on hand
Addison McDowell (R)	$1,456,167	$1,310,517	$152,973
Cyril Jefferson (D)	$232,325	$224,465	$7,859
Source: Federal Election Commission

==== Results ====
2026 North Carolina's 6th congressional district election
Party	Candidate	Votes	%	±%
Democratic	Cyril Jefferson	140,707	51.2%	
Republican	Addison McDowell (incumbent)	134,103	48.8%	
Total votes		274,810	100.0%	
Democratic gain from Republican				

== District 7 ==
North Carolina's 7th congressional district election
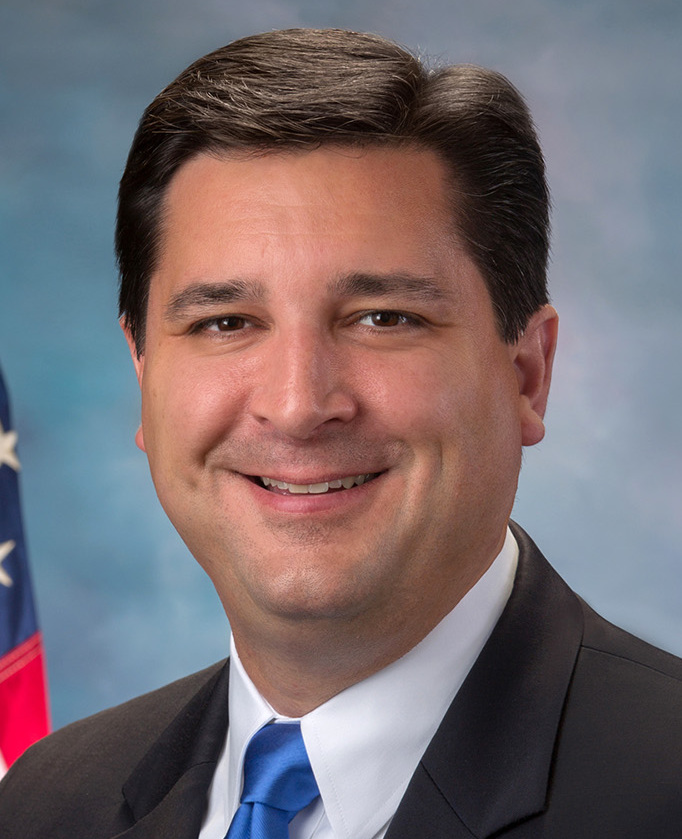

Nominee	David Rouzer	Kim Hardy
Party	Republican	Democratic
Popular vote	160,702	158,391
Percentage	49.8%	49.1%
U.S. Representative before election
David Rouzer
Republican
Elected U.S. Representative
David Rouzer
Republican

The 7th district includes all of Bladen, Brunswick, Columbus, New Hanover, and Pender counties, as well as most of Cumberland County, and portions of eastern Robeson County and northwestern Sampson County. The incumbent is Republican David Rouzer, who was re-elected with 58.6% of the vote in 2024.

=== Republican primary ===
==== Nominee ====
- David Rouzer, incumbent U.S. representative

==== Eliminated in primary ====
- David Buzzard, non-profit group manager and veteran

==== Endorsements ====
David Rouzer

Executive branch officials

- Donald Trump, 45th and 47th president of the United States (2017–2021, 2025–present)

Organizations

- AIPAC

==== Fundraising ====
Campaign finance reports as of March 31, 2026
Candidate	Raised	Spent	Cash on hand
David Rouzer (R)	$1,538,564	$968,179	$2,005,910
Source: Federal Election Commission

==== Results ====
Republican primary results
Party	Candidate	Votes	%
Republican	David Rouzer (incumbent)	43,577	80.5
Republican	David Buzzard	10,562	19.5
Total votes		54,139	100.0

=== Democratic primary ===
==== Nominee ====
- Kim Hardy, assistant professor

==== Fundraising ====
Campaign finance reports as of March 31, 2026
Candidate	Raised	Spent	Cash on hand
Kim Hardy (D)	$205,320	$151,924	$53,396
Source: Federal Election Commission

=== Libertarian primary ===
==== Nominee ====
- Maad Abu-Ghazalah, entrepreneur and animal rescue advocate

==== Fundraising ====
Campaign finance reports as of March 31, 2026
Candidate	Raised	Spent	Cash on hand
Maad Abu-Ghazalah (L)	$7,291	$6,695	$595
Source: Federal Election Commission

=== Independents ===
==== Withdrawn ====
- Mike Henry, business owner

=== General election ===
==== Predictions ====
Source	Ranking	As of
Decision Desk HQ	Likely R	July 14, 2026
The Cook Political Report	Likely R	November 2, 2026
Inside Elections	Solid R	March 7, 2025
Sabato's Crystal Ball	Safe R	April 10, 2025

==== Post-primary endorsements ====
David Rouzer (R)

Organizations

- U.S. Chamber of Commerce
Kim Hardy (D)

Labor unions

- Communications Workers of America (CWA)
- United Auto Workers

Organizations

- FIRE PAC
- National Association of Social Workers
- National Organization for Women
- National Women's Political Caucus
- Patriotic Millionaires

==== Polling ====
Poll source	Date(s) administered	Sample size	Margin of error	David Rouzer (R)	Kimberly Hardy (D)	Maad Abu-Ghazalah (L)	Undecided
Public Policy Polling (D) (Note: Poll sponsored by Hardy's campaign)	August 19–20, 2026	517 (LV)	–	45%	39%	3%	13%
Public Policy Polling (D)	August 19–20, 2026	517 (LV)	–	49%	43%	–	8%

==== Fundraising ====
Campaign finance reports as of October 14, 2026
Candidate	Raised	Spent	Cash on hand
David Rouzer (R)	$2,534,038	$2,269,811	$1,699,753
Kim Hardy (D)	$390,475	$370,057	$20,419
Maad Abu-Ghazalah (L)	$8,899	$8,621	$279
Source: Federal Election Commission

==== Results ====
2026 North Carolina's 7th congressional district election
Party	Candidate	Votes	%	±%
Republican	David Rouzer (incumbent)	160,702	49.8%	
Democratic	Kim Hardy	158,391	49.1%	
Libertarian	Maad Abu-Ghazalah	3,173	0.9%	
Total votes		322,266	100.0%	

== District 8 ==
North Carolina's 8th congressional district election
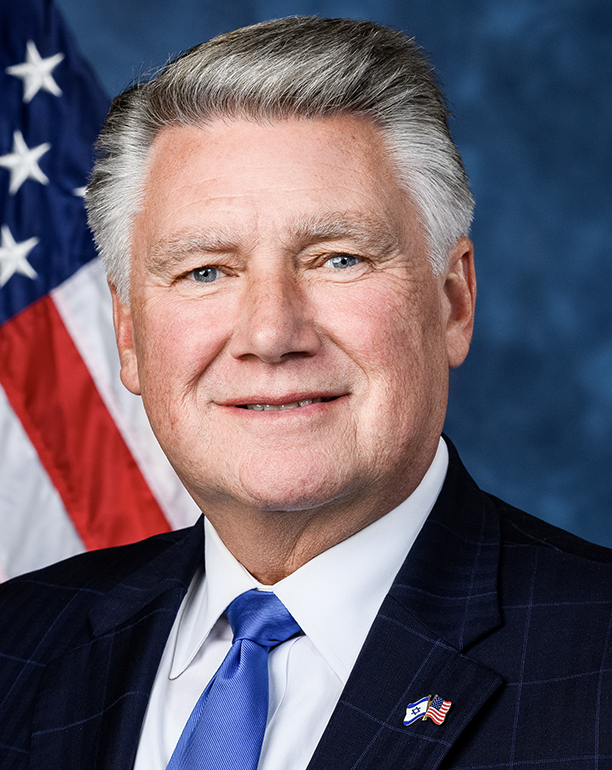

Nominee	Mark Harris	Colby Watson
Party	Republican	Democratic
Popular vote	147,683	142,659
Percentage	50.3%	48.6%
- Harris: 50–60% 60–70% Watson: 50–60%
U.S. Representative before election
Mark Harris
Republican
Elected U.S. Representative
Mark Harris
Republican

The 8th district includes all of Anson, Montgomery, Richmond, Scotland, Stanly, and Union counties, as well as most of Cabarrus County, portions of southern Mecklenburg County, and most of Robeson County. The incumbent is Republican Mark Harris, who was elected with 59.6% of the vote in 2024.

=== Republican primary ===
==== Nominee ====
- Mark Harris, incumbent U.S. representative

==== Disqualified ====
- Brianna Prince

==== Endorsements ====
Mark Harris

Organizations

- AIPAC
- Freedom Caucus Fund

==== Fundraising ====
Campaign finance reports as of March 31, 2026
Candidate	Raised	Spent	Cash on hand
Mark Harris (R)	$749,386	$457,380	$399,539
Source: Federal Election Commission

=== Democratic primary ===
==== Nominee ====
- Colby Watson, federal contractor

==== Eliminated in primary ====
- Kevin Clark, community activist and nominee for North Carolina's 29th Senate district in 2024

==== Withdrawn ====
- Justin Dues, tech consultant and nominee for this district in 2024 (ran for US Senate)
- Jesse Oppenheim, attorney (remained on ballot)

==== Disqualified ====
- Justin Bunting, author

==== Endorsements ====
Colby Watson

Publications

- The Charlotte Observer

==== Fundraising ====
Italics indicate withdrawn candidate

Campaign finance reports as of March 31, 2026
Candidate	Raised	Spent	Cash on hand
Jesse Oppenheim (D)	$314,019	$248,283	$65,736
Colby Watson (D)	$29,102	$27,271	$1,835
Source: Federal Election Commission

==== Results ====
Democratic primary results
Party	Candidate	Votes	%
Democratic	Colby Watson	18,272	47.9
Democratic	Kevin Clark	14,167	37.2
Democratic	Jesse Oppenheim (withdrawn)	5,693	14.9
Total votes		38,132	100.0

=== Green Primary ===
==== Nominee ====
- Robert "Bo" Whitehead, blue collar worker

=== General election ===
==== Predictions ====
Source	Ranking	As of
Decision Desk HQ	Likely R	July 14, 2026
The Cook Political Report	Solid R	February 6, 2025
Inside Elections	Solid R	March 7, 2025
Sabato's Crystal Ball	Safe R	April 10, 2025

==== Fundraising ====
Campaign finance reports as of October 14, 2026
Candidate	Raised	Spent	Cash on hand
Mark Harris (R)	$1,238,724	$934,993	$411,264
Colby Watson (D)	$57,590	$53,437	$4,158
Bo Whitehead (G)	$0	$0	$0
Source: Federal Election Commission

==== Results ====
2026 North Carolina's 8th congressional district election
Party	Candidate	Votes	%	±%
Republican	Mark Harris (incumbent)	147,683	50.3%	
Democratic	Colby Watson	142,659	48.6%	
Green	Bo Whitehead	2,909	0.9%	
Total votes		293,251	100.0%	

== District 9 ==
North Carolina's 9th congressional district election
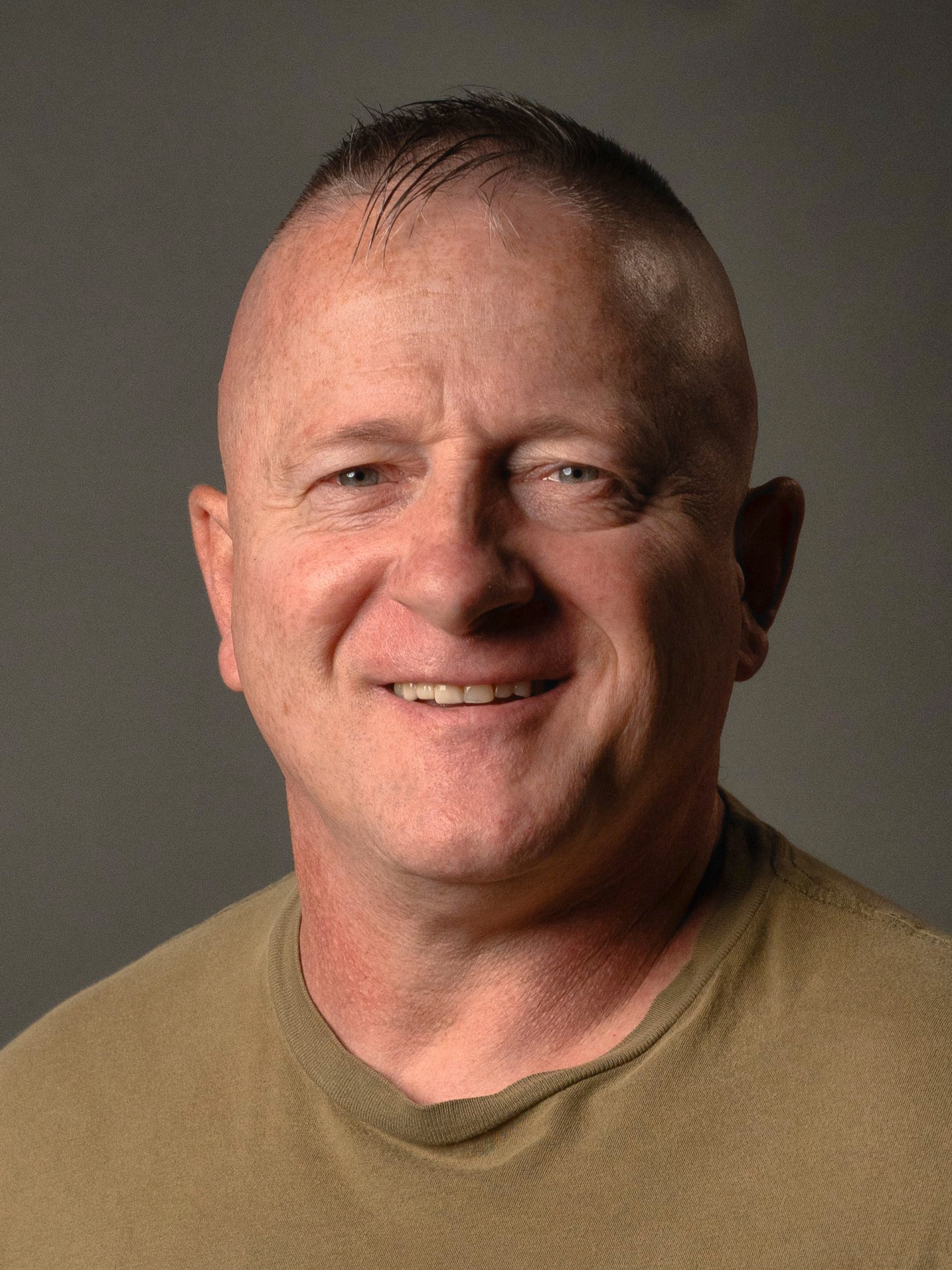

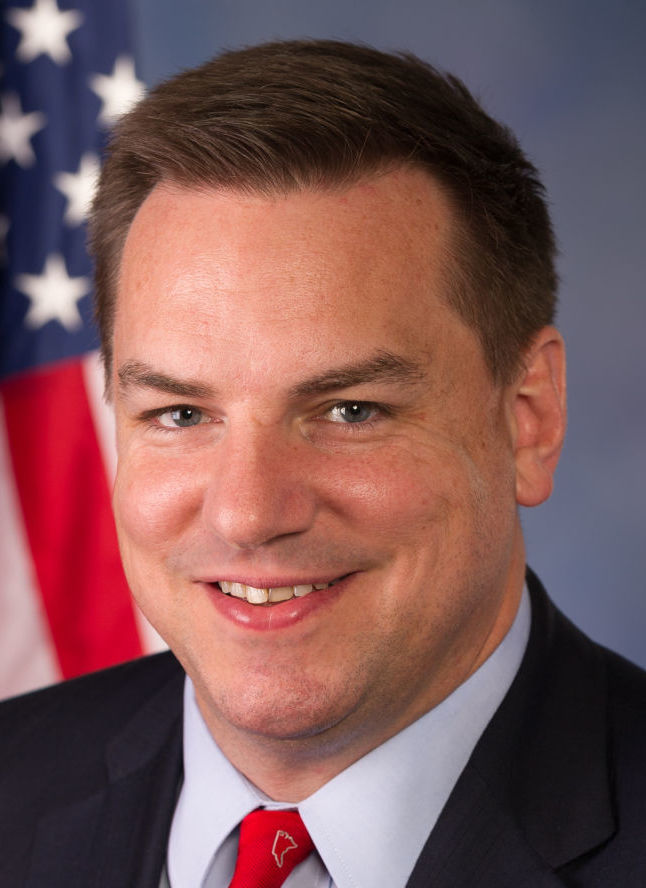
Nominee	Richard Ojeda	Richard Hudson
Party	Democratic	Republican
Popular vote	139,456	133,196
Percentage	51.1%	48.8%
- Ojeda: 50–60% 60–70% 70–80% Hudson: 50–60% 60–70%
U.S. Representative before election
Richard Hudson
Republican
Elected U.S. Representative
Richard Ojeda
Democratic

The 9th district includes all of Alamance, Hoke, Moore, and Randolph counties, as well as most of Chatham and Guilford counties, and portions of northwestern Cumberland County. The incumbent is Republican Richard Hudson, who was re-elected with 56.3% of the vote in 2024.

=== Republican primary ===
==== Nominee ====
- Richard Hudson, incumbent U.S. representative

==== Endorsements ====
Richard Hudson

Executive branch officials

- Donald Trump, 45th and 47th president of the United States (2017–2021, 2025–present)

Organizations

- AIPAC

==== Fundraising ====
Campaign finance reports as of March 31, 2026
Candidate	Raised	Spent	Cash on hand
Richard Hudson (R)	$2,777,387	$1,872,759	$1,536,362
Source: Federal Election Commission

=== Democratic primary ===
==== Nominee ====
- Richard Ojeda, former West Virginia state senator (2017–2019), nominee for West Virginia's 3rd congressional district in 2018, candidate for president in 2020, and candidate for U.S. Senate in West Virginia in 2020

==== Eliminated in primary ====
- Loren Bibler, horticultural specialist
- Nigel Bristow, law enforcement officer and nominee for this district in 2024
- Lent Carr II, pastor

==== Endorsements ====
Richard Ojeda

Labor unions

- Communications Workers of America (CWA)

Organizations

- Patriotic Millionaires

==== Fundraising ====
Campaign finance reports as of March 31, 2026
Candidate	Raised	Spent	Cash on hand
Nigel Bristow (D)	$5,737	$1,195	$38,482
Richard Ojeda (D)	$1,921,943	$1,697,655	$224,288
Source: Federal Election Commission

==== Results ====
Democratic primary results
Party	Candidate	Votes	%
Democratic	Richard Ojeda	18,469	41.8
Democratic	Nigel Bristow	11,824	26.7
Democratic	Lent Carr	6,968	15.8
Democratic	Loren Bibler	6,960	15.7
Total votes		44,221	100.0

=== Independents ===
==== Disqualified ====
- Tita Hunter-Herod, college professor
- Franklin Payne

=== General election ===
==== Predictions ====
Source	Ranking	As of
Decision Desk HQ	Likely R	July 14, 2026
The Cook Political Report	Likely R	October 30, 2026
Inside Elections	Likely R	October 29, 2026
Sabato's Crystal Ball	Likely R	November 2, 2026

==== Post-primary endorsements ====
Richard Ojeda (D)

Labor unions

- American Federation of Government Employees (AFGE)
- Association of Flight Attendants-CWA
- North Carolina State AFL-CIO
- United Auto Workers

Organizations

- Democrats Abroad
- Feminist Majority Foundation PAC
- National Association of Social Workers
- Planned Parenthood Action Fund
- Population Connection
- Progressive Victory
- Reproductive Freedom for All

==== Fundraising ====
Campaign finance reports as of October 14, 2026
Candidate	Raised	Spent	Cash on hand
Richard Hudson (R)	$4,173,708	$3,879,466	$925,976
Richard Ojeda (D)	$2,930,069	$2,941,848	$45,572
Source: Federal Election Commission

==== Polling ====
Poll source	Date(s) administered	Sample size	Margin of error	Richard Hudson (R)	Richard Ojeda (D)	Undecided
Public Policy Polling (D)	October 19–20, 2026	526 (LV)	–	46%	42%	12%
Lake Research Partners (D) (Note: Poll sponsored by Ojeda's campaign)	August 31 – September 3, 2026	400 (LV)	—	46%	42%	12%

==== Results ====
2026 North Carolina's 9th congressional district election
Party	Candidate	Votes	%	±%
Democratic	Richard Ojeda	139,456	51.1%	
Republican	Richard Hudson (incumbent)	133,196	48.8%	
Total votes		272,652	100.0%	
Democratic gain from Republican				

== District 10 ==
North Carolina's 10th congressional district election
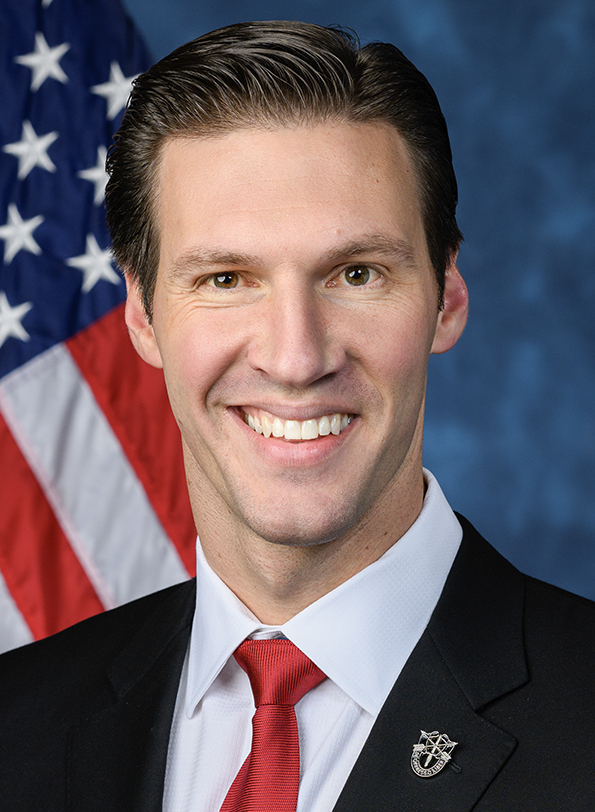

Nominee	Pat Harrigan	Ashley Bell
Party	Republican	Democratic
Popular vote	146,589	144,073
Percentage	49.6%	48.7%
- Harrigan: 50–60% 60–70% 70–80% Bell: 60–70%
U.S. Representative before election
Pat Harrigan
Republican
Elected U.S. Representative
Pat Harrigan
Republican

The 10th district includes all of Catawba, Iredell, Lincoln, and Yadkin counties, as well as most of Forsyth County. The incumbent is Republican Pat Harrigan, who was elected with 57.5% of the vote in 2024.

=== Republican primary ===
==== Nominee ====
- Pat Harrigan, incumbent U.S. representative

==== Eliminated in primary ====
- Matt Sin, community organizer and former engineer

==== Endorsements ====
Pat Harrigan

Executive branch officials

- Donald Trump, 45th and 47th president of the United States (2017–2021, 2025–present)

Organizations

- AIPAC

==== Fundraising ====
Campaign finance reports as of March 31, 2026
Candidate	Raised	Spent	Cash on hand
Pat Harrigan (R)	$973,976	$586,538	$440,280
Matt Sin (R)	$6,840	$1,917	$4,923
Source: Federal Election Commission

==== Results ====
Republican primary results
Party	Candidate	Votes	%
Republican	Pat Harrigan (incumbent)	46,270	87.7
Republican	Matt Sin	6,509	12.3
Total votes		52,779	100.0

=== Democratic primary ===
==== Nominee ====
- Ashley Bell, physician associate

==== Eliminated in primary ====
- West Caudle, entrepreneur
- Harry Morley, education specialist
- Marcus Pearson, educator and candidate for North Carolina's 72nd House district in 2024
- Ralph Scott Jr., retired federal employee, U.S. Air Force veteran and nominee for this district in 2024
- Mir Yarfitz, associate professor

==== Endorsements ====
Ashley Bell

Organizations

- Red Wine & Blue
- Track AIPAC

Publications

- Daily Kos
West Caudle

Organizations

- Center for Freethought Equality
- Young Democrats of North Carolina
Mir Yarfitz

Organizations

- Democratic Socialists of America Winston-Salem

==== Fundraising ====
Campaign finance reports as of March 31, 2026
Candidate	Raised	Spent	Cash on hand
Ashley Bell (D)	$28,004	$24,345	$5,695
West Caudle (D)	$38,293	$27,351	$10,942
Harry Morley (D)	$14,729	$2,898	$12,011
Mir Yarfitz (D)	$27,125	$29,456	$0
Source: Federal Election Commission

==== Results ====
Democratic primary results
Party	Candidate	Votes	%
Democratic	Ashley Bell	19,472	47.3
Democratic	West Caudle	6,404	15.6
Democratic	Harry Morley	4,672	11.4
Democratic	Marcus Pearson	4,070	9.9
Democratic	Mir Yarfitz	3,952	9.6
Democratic	Ralph Scott Jr.	2,591	6.3
Total votes		41,161	100.0

=== Libertarian primary ===
==== Nominee ====
- Steve Feldman, research scientist and nominee for this district in 2024

==== Fundraising ====
Campaign finance reports as of March 31, 2026
Candidate	Raised	Spent	Cash on hand
Steve Feldman (L)	$26,009	$41,988	$1,282
Source: Federal Election Commission

=== General election ===
==== Predictions ====
Source	Ranking	As of
Decision Desk HQ	Likely R	July 14, 2026
The Cook Political Report	Solid R	February 6, 2025
Inside Elections	Solid R	March 7, 2025
Sabato's Crystal Ball	Safe R	April 10, 2025

==== Post-primary endorsements ====
Ashley Bell (D)

Organizations

- Equality North Carolina
- FIRE PAC
- GOTV PAC
- National Association of Social Workers
- National Women's Political Caucus

==== Fundraising ====
Campaign finance reports as of October 14, 2026
Candidate	Raised	Spent	Cash on hand
Pat Harrigan (R)	$1,318,233	$908,096	$462,978
Ashley Bell (D)	$147,720	$135,901	$11,774
Steve Feldman (L)	$48,627	$64,593	$1,295
Source: Federal Election Commission

==== Polling ====
Poll source	Date(s) administered	Sample size	Margin of error	Pat Harrigan (R)	Ashley Bell (D)	Undecided
Ragnar Research Partners (R) (Note: Poll commissioned by Conservatives For America, an organization linked to the Republican Study Committee)	March 10–12, 2026	400 (LV)	± 5.0%	52%	37%	11%

Hypothetical polling

Generic Republican vs. generic Democrat

Poll source	Date(s) administered	Sample size	Margin of error	Generic Republican	Generic Democrat	Undecided
Ragnar Research Partners (R)	March 10–12, 2026	400 (LV)	± 5.0%	51%	38%	11%

==== Results ====
2026 North Carolina's 10th congressional district election
Party	Candidate	Votes	%	±%
Republican	Pat Harrigan	146,589	49.6%	
Democratic	Ashley Bell	144,073	48.7%	
Libertarian	Steve Feldman	4,711	1.6%	
Total votes		295,373	100.0%	

== District 11 ==
North Carolina's 11th congressional district election

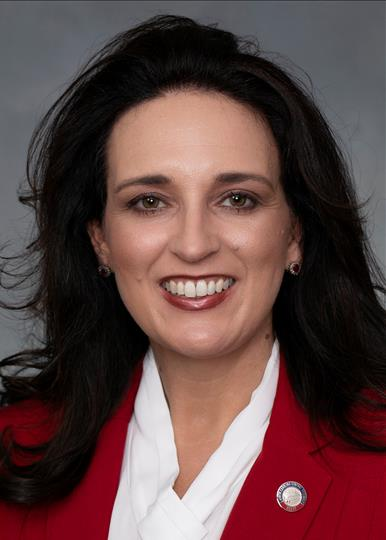
Nominee	Jamie Ager	Jennifer Balkcom (replacing Chuck Edwards)
Party	Democratic	Republican
Popular vote	196,251	141,885
Percentage	57.1%	41.3%
- Ager: 50–60% 70–80% Balkcom: 50–60% 60–70%
U.S. Representative before election
Chuck Edwards
Republican
Elected U.S. Representative
Jamie Ager
Democratic

The 11th district includes all of Avery, Buncombe, Cherokee, Clay, Graham, Haywood, Henderson, Jackson, Macon, Madison, McDowell, Mitchell, Swain, Transylvania, and Yancey counties, as well as portions of Polk County. The incumbent is Republican Chuck Edwards, who was re-elected with 56.8% of the vote in 2024.

On August 5, 2026, after being recommended for censure by the House Ethics Committee, Edwards ended his re-election bid. The North Carolina Republican Party formed a committee which chose state representative Jennifer Balkcom as a replacement nominee. In the end, Ager won by over 15 points, even though Edwards had won by 13 points two years earlier.

=== Republican primary ===
==== Withdrew after nomination ====
- Chuck Edwards, incumbent U.S. representative

==== Eliminated in primary ====
- Adam Smith, nonprofit CEO

==== Endorsements ====
Chuck Edwards

Executive branch officials

- Donald Trump, president of the United States (2017–2021, 2025–present)

U.S. representatives

- Charles Taylor, former NC-11 (1991–2007)

Organizations

- AIPAC

==== Fundraising ====
Campaign finance reports as of March 31, 2026
Candidate	Raised	Spent	Cash on hand
Chuck Edwards (R)	$784,839	$406,385	$487,218
Adam Smith (R)	$67,449	$65,946	$1,503
Source: Federal Election Commission

==== Results ====
Republican primary results
Party	Candidate	Votes	%
Republican	Chuck Edwards (incumbent)	47,795	70.1
Republican	Adam Smith	20,389	29.9
Total votes		68,184	100.0

=== Replacement nominee selection ===
==== Nominee ====
- Jennifer Balkcom, state representative from the 117th district (2023–present) (previously declined, endorsed Moffitt)

==== Eliminated at committee meeting ====
- Matthew Burril, financial advisor and candidate for this district in 2022
- Ken McKim, real estate agent, nominee for Texas's 3rd House of Representatives district in 1994, nominee for North Carolina's 50th Senate district in 2006 and candidate for this district (Note: This district was briefly numbered the 14th district during the 2020 United States redistricting cycle.) in 2022
- Chad Nesbitt, activist and journalist
- Christian Reagan, mortgage broker and candidate for this district in 2024
- Kristie Sluder, crisis clinician and nominee for North Carolina's 49th Senate district in 2024

==== Declined ====
- Kevin Corbin, state senator from the 50th district (2021–present)
- Warren Daniel, state senator from the 46th district (2013–present)
- Jake Johnson, state representative from the 113th district (2019–present)
- Tim Moffitt, state senator from the 48th district (2023–present)
- Mark Pless, state representative from the 118th district (2021–present)
- Adam Smith, nonprofit CEO and primary candidate for this district

==== Endorsements ====
Jennifer Balkcom

U.S. senators

- Ted Budd, North Carolina (2023–present)

U.S. Representatives

- Greg Murphy, NC-03 (2019–present)

State legislators

- Destin Hall, speaker of the North Carolina House of Representatives (2025–present) from HD-87 (2017–present)
Tim Moffitt (declined)

State legislators

- ~~Jennifer Balkcom, HD-117 (2023–present)~~ (entered race)

=== Democratic primary ===
==== Nominee ====
- Jamie Ager, farmer and grandson of former U.S. representative Jamie Clarke

==== Eliminated in primary ====
- Zelda Briarwood, field services technician
- Richard Hudspeth, physician
- Paul Maddox, cancer researcher
- Lee Whipple, civil engineer

==== Withdrawn ====
- Moe Davis, retired U.S. Air Force colonel and nominee for this district in 2020
- Chris Harjes, real estate investor
- Jacob Lawrence, former World Food Programme project manager

==== Endorsements ====
Jamie Ager

U.S. representatives

- Suzan DelBene, WA-01 (2012–present)

Labor unions

- North Carolina State AFL-CIO
- United Brotherhood of Carpenters and Joiners of America Southern Regional Council of Carpenters

Organizations

- Blue Dog PAC
- Communications Workers of America (CWA)
- DCCC Red to Blue
- League of Conservation Voters
- Patriotic Millionaires
- Red Wine & Blue
- WelcomePAC
- Young Democrats of North Carolina
Zelda Briarwood

Organizations

- Center for Freethought Equality
Richard Hudspeth

Individuals

- Moe Davis, podcaster and former candidate for this district

==== Fundraising ====
Campaign finance reports as of March 31, 2026
Candidate	Raised	Spent	Cash on hand
Jamie Ager (D)	$1,690,328	$575,614	$1,114,714
Zelda Briarwood (D)	$39,219	$39,502	$17
Richard Hudspeth (D)	$217,241	$217,241	$0
Paul Maddox (D)	$94,613	$91,422	$3,191
Lee Whipple (D)	$2,882	$2,882	$0
Source: Federal Election Commission

==== Results ====
Democratic primary results
Party	Candidate	Votes	%
Democratic	Jamie Ager	49,193	64.7
Democratic	Richard Hudspeth	12,063	15.9
Democratic	Zelda Briarwood	9,893	13.0
Democratic	Paul Maddox	3,857	5.1
Democratic	Lee Whipple	1,078	1.4
Total votes		76,084	100.0

=== Libertarian primary ===
==== Nominee ====
- Travis Groo, safety specialist, former executive committee member for the Wake County Libertarian Party and perennial candidate

==== Disqualified ====
- Jon Connors, activist and small business owner

=== Independents ===
==== Withdrawn ====
- John Rogers, attorney

==== Disqualified ====
- Jamie Lardner, business owner (write-in)

=== General election ===
==== Predictions ====
Source	Ranking	As of
Decision Desk HQ	Tossup	September 25, 2026
The Cook Political Report	Lean D (flip)	October 23, 2026
Inside Elections	Tilt D (flip)	October 29, 2026
Sabato's Crystal Ball	Lean D (flip)	October 20, 2026

==== Post-primary endorsements ====
Jennifer Balkcom (R)

Executive branch officials

- Donald Trump, president of the United States (2017–2021, 2025–present)

U.S. representatives

- Richard Hudson, NC-09 (2013–present)

Organizations

- NRCC MAGA Majority
Jamie Ager (D)

Labor unions

- American Federation of Government Employees (AFGE)
- United Auto Workers

Organizations

- 314 Action
- Center for Biological Diversity
- Democrats Abroad
- End Citizens United
- Feminist Majority Foundation PAC
- GOTV PAC
- Leadership Now Project
- NRDC Action Fund
- NewDems
- Planned Parenthood Action Fund
- Reproductive Freedom for All
- Sierra Club

==== Fundraising ====
Italics indicate a withdrawn candidate.

Campaign finance reports as of October 14, 2026
Candidate	Raised	Spent	Cash on hand
Chuck Edwards (R)	$1,025,828	$736,190	$398,402
Jennifer Balkcom (R)	$399,492	$104,674	$294,818
Jamie Ager (D)	$5,869,453	$5,249,295	$620,158
Travis Groo (L)	$0	$0	$0
Source: Federal Election Commission

==== Polling ====
Poll source	Date(s) administered	Sample size	Margin of error	Jennifer Balkcom (R)	Jamie Ager (D)	Undecided
RedBox Research (D)	October 20-23, 2026	873 (LV)	± 4.7%	44%	50%	6% (Note: "Someone else" with 2%; "Prefer not to answer" with 1%; Travis Groo (L) with 1%)
Emerson College (Note: Poll sponsored by Poll Vault)	October 12–14, 2026	388 (LV)	–	43%	56%	1%
Public Policy Polling (D) (Note: Poll sponsored by The Bench, which supports Ager)	September 10–11, 2026	531 (RV)	± 4.3%	44%	47%	9%

Hypothetical polling

Chuck Edwards vs. Jamie Ager

Poll source	Date(s) administered	Sample size	Margin of error	Chuck Edwards (R)	Jamie Ager (D)	Undecided
Impact Research (D) (Note: Poll sponsored by Ager's campaign)	December 15–17, 2025	500 (LV)	± 4.4%	44%	45%	10%

Generic Republican vs. generic Democrat

Poll source	Date(s) administered	Sample size	Margin of error	Generic Republican	Generic Democrat	Undecided
Public Policy Polling (D)	September 10–11, 2026	531 (RV)	± 4.3%	50%	46%	4%

==== Results ====
2026 North Carolina's 11th congressional district election
Party	Candidate	Votes	%	±%
Democratic	Jamie Ager	196,251	57.1%	
Republican	Jennifer Balkcom	141,885	41.3%	
Libertarian	Travis Groo	5,369	1.5%	
Total votes		343,505	100.0%	
Democratic gain from Republican				

== District 12 ==
North Carolina's 12th congressional district election
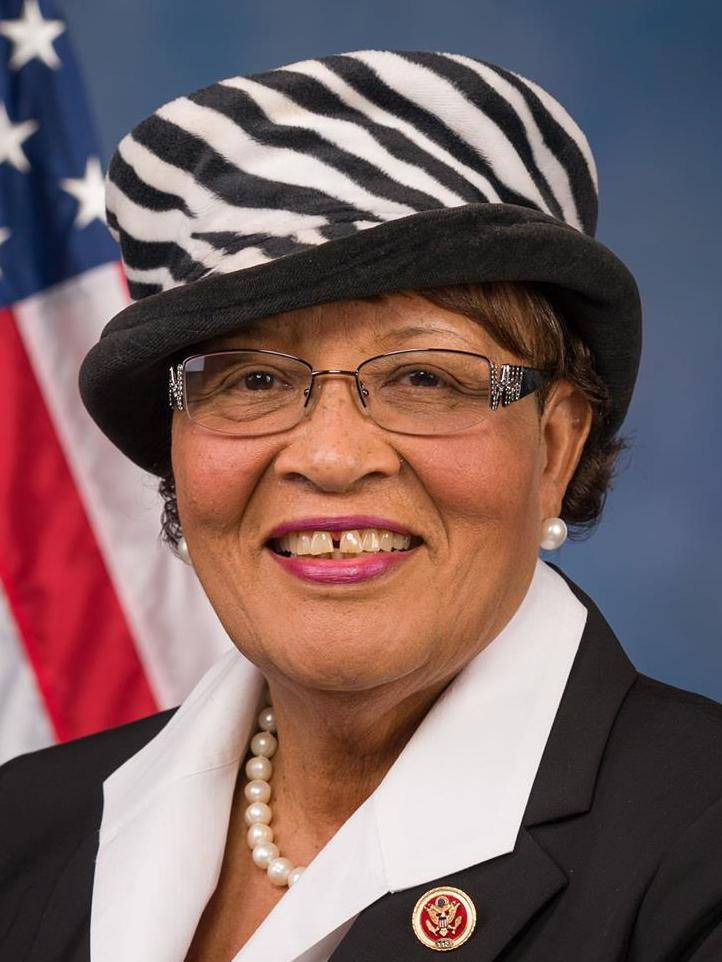

Nominee	Alma Adams	Jack Codiga
Party	Democratic	Republican
Popular vote	220,770	51,022
Percentage	81.2%	18.7%
U.S. Representative before election
Alma Adams
Democratic
Elected U.S. Representative
Alma Adams
Democratic

The 12th district includes portions of central Mecklenburg County. The incumbent is Democrat Alma Adams, who was re-elected with 74.0% of the vote in 2024.

=== Democratic primary ===
==== Nominee ====
- Alma Adams, incumbent U.S. representative

==== Eliminated in primary ====
- Monaca Johnson-Williamson, teacher and sales marketing executive

==== Disqualified ====
- Emily McCarthy

==== Endorsements ====
Alma Adams

Labor unions

- Communications Workers of America (CWA)

Organizations

- Bend the Arc
- Equality North Carolina
- J Street
- National Organization for Women PAC
- Planned Parenthood Action Fund
- Progressive Democrats of America
- Reproductive Freedom for All
- Sierra Club
- Working Families Party
- Young Democrats of North Carolina

Newspapers

- The Charlotte Observer

==== Fundraising ====
Campaign finance reports as of March 31, 2026
Candidate	Raised	Spent	Cash on hand
Alma Adams (D)	$337,831	$442,513	$468,728
Source: Federal Election Commission

==== Results ====
Democratic primary results
Party	Candidate	Votes	%
Democratic	Alma Adams (incumbent)	54,630	78.9
Democratic	Monaca Johnson-Williamson	14,589	21.1
Total votes		69,219	100.0

=== Republican primary ===
==== Nominee ====
- Jack Codiga, financial executive

==== Eliminated in primary ====
- Addul Ali, former chair of the Cabarrus County Republican Party and nominee for this district in 2024

==== Endorsements ====
Addul Ali

Publications

- The Charlotte Observer

==== Fundraising ====
Campaign finance reports as of March 31, 2026
Candidate	Raised	Spent	Cash on hand
Addul Ali (R)	$17,802	$17,802	$0
Jack Codiga (R)	$15,101	$12,555	$2,546
Source: Federal Election Commission

==== Results ====
Republican primary results
Party	Candidate	Votes	%
Republican	Jack Codiga	6,569	67.4
Republican	Addul Ali	3,183	32.6
Total votes		9,752	100.0

=== Independents ===
==== Disqualified ====
- Hunter DeYoung
- Ryan Rabah, attorney
- Charay Smith, educator and nonprofit executive director

==== Fundraising ====
Italics indicate disqualified candidate

Campaign finance reports as of March 31, 2026
Candidate	Raised	Spent	Cash on hand
Ryan Rabah (I)	$8,522	$8,522	$0
Charay Smith (I)	$62,887	$50,109	$1,226
Source: Federal Election Commission

=== General election ===
==== Predictions ====
Source	Ranking	As of
Decision Desk HQ	Safe D	July 14, 2026
The Cook Political Report	Solid D	February 6, 2025
Inside Elections	Solid D	March 7, 2025
Sabato's Crystal Ball	Safe D	April 10, 2025

==== Post-primary endorsements ====
Alma Adams (D)

Labor unions

- United Auto Workers

Organizations

- Center for Biological Diversity
- Feminist Majority Foundation PAC
- Food & Water Action
- National Organization for Women PAC
Jack Codiga (R)

Individuals

- James Fishback, investor and candidate for Governor of Florida in 2026

==== Fundraising ====
Campaign finance reports as of October 14, 2026
Candidate	Raised	Spent	Cash on hand
Alma Adams (D)	$483,375	$572,788	$483,997
Jack Codiga (R)	$54,620	$50,829	$3,790
Source: Federal Election Commission

==== Results ====
2026 North Carolina's 12th congressional district election
Party	Candidate	Votes	%	±%
Democratic	Alma Adams (incumbent)	220,770	81.2%	
Republican	Jack Codiga	51,022	18.7%	
Total votes		271,792	100.05	

== District 13 ==
North Carolina's 13th congressional district election

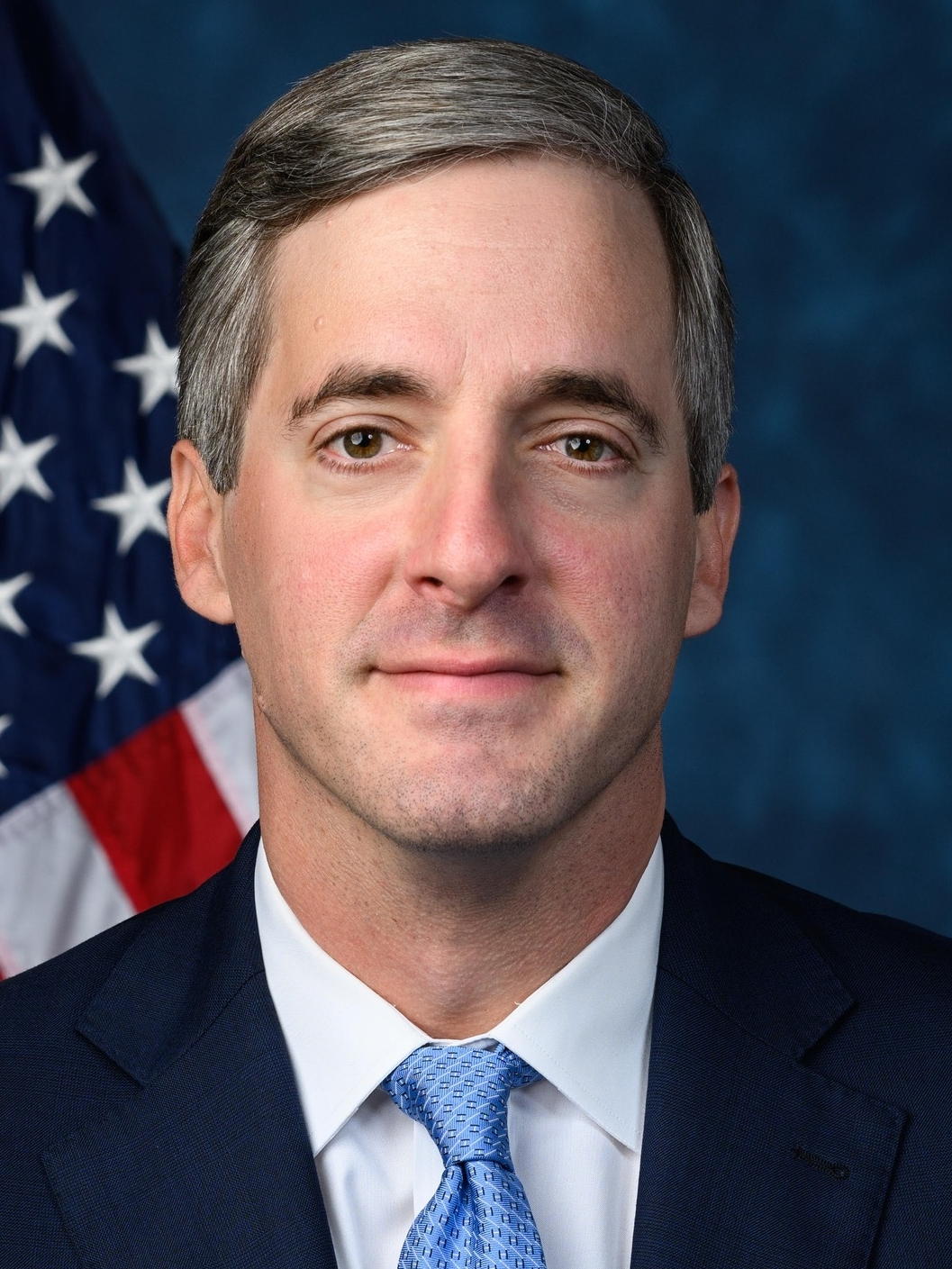
Nominee	Paul Barringer	Brad Knott
Party	Democratic	Republican
Popular vote	160,860	152,864
Percentage	50.5%	48.0%
- Barringer: 40–50% 50–60% Knott: 50–60%
U.S. Representative before election
Brad Knott
Republican
Elected U.S. Representative
Paul Barringer
Democratic

The 13th district includes all of Caswell, Franklin, Harnett, Johnston, Lee, and Person counties, as well as most of Granville County and portions of Wake County. The incumbent is Republican Brad Knott, who flipped the district and was elected with 58.6% of the vote in 2024.

=== Republican primary ===
==== Nominee ====
- Brad Knott, incumbent U.S. representative

==== Eliminated in primary ====
- Sid Sharma, accountant and candidate for this district in 2024

==== Disqualified ====
- Josh McConkey, physician and candidate for this district in 2024

==== Endorsements ====
Brad Knott

Executive branch officials

- Donald Trump, 45th and 47th president of the United States (2017–2021, 2025–present)

==== Fundraising ====
Campaign finance reports as of March 31, 2026
Candidate	Raised	Spent	Cash on hand
Brad Knott (R)	$1,082,840	$511,912	$588,189
Source: Federal Election Commission

==== Results ====
Republican primary results
Party	Candidate	Votes	%
Republican	Brad Knott (incumbent)	44,038	89.9
Republican	Sid Sharma	4,935	10.1
Total votes		48,973	100.0

=== Democratic primary ===
==== Nominee ====
- Paul Barringer, attorney and healthcare consultant

==== Eliminated in primary ====
- Alexander Nicholi, software developer
- Frank Pierce, landscaping business owner and nominee for this district in 2024

==== Endorsements ====
Paul Barringer

U.S. representatives

- David Price, former NC-04 (1987-1995, 1997–2023)

Labor unions

- Communications Workers of America (CWA)

Organizations

- Young Democrats of North Carolina

Newspapers

- The News & Observer (Democratic primary only)

==== Fundraising ====
Campaign finance reports as of March 31, 2026
Candidate	Raised	Spent	Cash on hand
Paul Barringer (D)	$805,553	$378,960	$426,593
Alexander Nicholi (D)	$7,141	$7,065	$77
Frank Pierce (D)	$1,740	$2,279	$797
Source: Federal Election Commission

==== Results ====
Democratic primary results
Party	Candidate	Votes	%
Democratic	Paul Barringer	29,743	59.1
Democratic	Frank Pierce	14,794	29.4
Democratic	Alexander Nicholi	5,800	11.5
Total votes		50,337	100.0

=== Libertarian primary ===
==== Nominee ====
- Steven Swinton, businessman and nominee for North Carolina's 19th Senate district in 2024

=== Green Primary ===
==== Disqualified ====
- Anthony Aguilar, retired U.S. Army lieutenant colonel and activist

==== Endorsements ====
Anthony Aguilar (disqualified)

Organizations

- Track AIPAC

==== Fundraising ====
Italics indicate disqualified candidate

Campaign finance reports as of March 31, 2026
Candidate	Raised	Spent	Cash on hand
Anthony Aguilar (G)	$50,017	$16,496	$33,521
Source: Federal Election Commission

=== General election ===
==== Predictions ====
Source	Ranking	As of
Decision Desk HQ	Likely R	July 14, 2026
The Cook Political Report	Likely R	October 23, 2026
Inside Elections	Likely R	October 29, 2026
Sabato's Crystal Ball	Likely R	November 2, 2026

==== Post-primary endorsements ====
Brad Knott (R)

Organizations

- U.S. Chamber of Commerce
Paul Barringer (D)

U.S. representatives

- Adam Gray, CA-13 (2025–present)

Labor unions

- United Auto Workers

Organizations

- Blue Dog PAC

==== Fundraising ====
Campaign finance reports as of October 14, 2026
Candidate	Raised	Spent	Cash on hand
Brad Knott (R)	$1,697,075	$1,094,864	$619,471
Paul Barringer (D)	$1,215,151	$805,629	$409,522
Steven Swinton (L)	$0	$0	$0
Source: Federal Election Commission

==== Results ====
2026 North Carolina's 13th congressional district election
Party	Candidate	Votes	%	±%
Democratic	Paul Barringer	160,860	50.5%	
Republican	Brad Knott (incumbent)	152,864	48.0%	
Libertarian	Steven Swinton	4,511	1.4%	
Total votes		318,235	100.0%	
Democratic gain from Republican				

== District 14 ==
North Carolina's 14th congressional district election

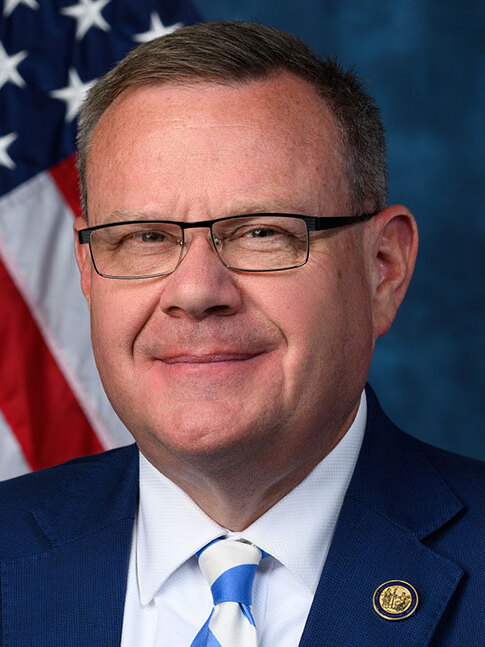
Nominee	LaKesha Womack	Tim Moore
Party	Democratic	Republican
Popular vote	147,920	141,353
Percentage	51.1%	48.8%
- Womack: 60–70% Moore: 50–60% 60–70%
U.S. Representative before election
Tim Moore
Republican
Elected U.S. Representative
LaKesha Womack
Democratic

The 14th district includes all of Burke, Cleveland, Gaston, and Rutherford counties, as well as portions of Mecklenburg and Polk counties. The incumbent is Republican Tim Moore, who flipped the district and was elected with 58.1% of the vote in 2024.

=== Republican primary ===
==== Nominee ====
- Tim Moore, incumbent U.S. representative

==== Eliminated in primary ====
- Kate Barr, behavioral specialist and Democratic nominee for North Carolina's 37th Senate district in 2024

==== Endorsements ====
Kate Barr

Organizations

- Red Wine & Blue
Tim Moore

Executive branch officials

- Donald Trump, 45th and 47th president of the United States (2017–2021, 2025–present)

Organizations

- AIPAC

Publications

- The Charlotte Observer

==== Fundraising ====
Campaign finance reports as of March 31, 2026
Candidate	Raised	Spent	Cash on hand
Kate Barr (R)	$76,450	$76,450	$0
Tim Moore (R)	$1,433,646	$782,550	$1,574,663
Source: Federal Election Commission

==== Results ====
Republican primary results
Party	Candidate	Votes	%
Republican	Tim Moore (incumbent)	42,545	83.0
Republican	Kate Barr	8,699	17.0
Total votes		51,244	100.0

=== Democratic primary ===
==== Nominee ====
- LaKesha Womack, business consultant

==== Eliminated in primary ====
- Brent Caldwell, attorney
- Ahmid Kargbo, IT professional

==== Endorsements ====
Brent Caldwell

Publications

- The Charlotte Observer

==== Fundraising ====
Campaign finance reports as of March 31, 2026
Candidate	Raised	Spent	Cash on hand
Brent Caldwell (D)	$78,144	$78,435	$0
LaKesha Womack (D)	$11,312	$12,172	$0
Source: Federal Election Commission

==== Results ====
Democratic primary results
Party	Candidate	Votes	%
Democratic	LaKesha Womack	20,641	52.2
Democratic	Brent Caldwell	16,513	41.8
Democratic	Ahmid Kargbo	2,361	6.0
Total votes		39,515	100.0

=== General election ===
==== Predictions ====
Source	Ranking	As of
Decision Desk HQ	Likely R	July 14, 2026
The Cook Political Report	Likely R	November 2, 2026
Inside Elections	Solid R	March 7, 2025
Sabato's Crystal Ball	Safe R	April 10, 2025

==== Post-primary endorsements ====
Tim Moore (R)

Organizations

- U.S. Chamber of Commerce
LaKesha Womack (D)

Organizations

- Collective PAC

==== Fundraising ====
Campaign finance reports as of October 14, 2026
Candidate	Raised	Spent	Cash on hand
Tim Moore (R)	$2,091,455	$1,921,880	$1,093,141
LaKesha Womack (D)	$59,183	$55,626	$4,793
Source: Federal Election Commission

==== Polling ====
Poll source	Date(s) administered	Sample size	Margin of error	Tim Moore (R)	LaKesha Womack (D)	Undecided
Ragnar Research Partners (R)	March 10–12, 2026	400 (LV)	± 5.0%	48%	40%	12%

Hypothetical polling

Generic Republican vs. generic Democrat

Poll source	Date(s) administered	Sample size	Margin of error	Generic Republican	Generic Democrat	Undecided
Ragnar Research Partners (R)	March 10–12, 2026	400 (LV)	± 5.0%	47%	38%	15%

==== Results ====
2026 North Carolina's 14th congressional district election
Party	Candidate	Votes	%	±%
Democratic	LaKesha Womack	147,920	51.1%	
Republican	Tim Moore (incumbent)	141,353	48.8%	
Total votes		289,273	100.0%	
Democratic gain from Republican				

== See also ==
- 2026 United States Senate election in North Carolina
- Dummymandering

== Notes ==
Partisan clients
