= North Carolina's 14th congressional district =

U.S. House district for North Carolina

Coordinates: 35.21°N 81.01°W

- Interactive map of district boundaries since January 3, 2025 (Note: As the mid-decade redistricting bill (S249) enacted on October 22, 2025 only changed the compositions of North Carolina's 1st and 3rd congressional districts, boundaries of other districts will not change at the 2026 elections.)
- Representative: Tim Moore; R–Kings Mountain
- Population (2025): 820,496
- Median household income: $83,134
- Ethnicity: 67.7% White; 15.2% Black; 8.6% Hispanic; 4.0% Two or more races; 3.8% Asian; 0.7% other
- Cook PVI: R+8

North Carolina's 14th congressional district is a congressional district in the United States House of Representatives created after the 2020 United States census. The newly created district was first drawn by a three-judge panel in the Wake County Superior Court as part of a remedial map that was only used for the 2022 United States House of Representatives elections in North Carolina. It currently includes all Burke, Cleveland, Gaston, and Rutherford Counties, along with portions of Mecklenburg, and Polk Counties, including portions of Charlotte. In 2022, the district included the southern half of Mecklenburg County and three-fourths of Gaston County.

In 2022, the district originally leaned Democratic. Even though Gaston County is heavily Republican, the district's share of heavily Democratic Mecklenburg County had twice the population of the Gaston County portion. On October 25, 2023, the North Carolina General Assembly created and passed a new congressional map that carved away most of the district's share of Mecklenburg County and pushed it into heavily Republican territory in the Foothills. This shifted the district's Cook Partisan Voting Index from D+6 to R+8.

The 14th district was first represented by Democrat Jeff Jackson and is now currently represented by Republican Tim Moore.

== Counties and communities ==
For the 119th and successive Congresses (based on the districts drawn following a 2023 legislative session), the district contains all or portions of the following counties and communities.

Burke County (11)
All 11 communities
Cleveland County (16)
All 16 communities
Gaston County (17)
All 17 communities
Mecklenburg County (5)
Charlotte (part; also 8th and 12th), Cornelius, Davidson (part; also 10th; shared with Iredell County), Huntersville, Pineville (part; also 12th)
Polk County (2)
Columbus (part; also 11th), Tryon
Rutherford County (11)
All 11 communities

== Recent election results from statewide races ==
Year	Office	Results
2008	President	McCain 58% - 41%
2008	Senate	Dole 51% - 46%
2008	Governor	McCrory 60% - 38%
2010	Senate	Burr 62% - 35%
2012	President	Romney 60% - 40%
2012	Governor	McCrory 65% - 33%
2014	Senate	Tillis 56% - 39%
2016	President	Trump 59% - 37%
2016	Senate	Burr 59% - 37%
2016	Governor	McCrory 57% - 41%
2016	Lt. Governor	Forest 61% - 36%
2016	Secretary of State	LaPaglia 57% - 43%
2016	Auditor	Stuber 59% - 41%
2016	Treasurer	Folwell 62% - 38%
2016	Attorney General	Newton 58% - 42%
2020	President	Trump 57% - 41%
2020	Senate	Tillis 56% - 40%
2020	Governor	Forest 55% - 44%
2020	Lt. Governor	Robinson 59% - 41%
2020	Secretary of State	Sykes 57% - 43%
2020	Auditor	Street 57% - 43%
2020	Treasurer	Folwell 60% - 40%
2020	Attorney General	O'Neill 57% - 43%
2022	Senate	Budd 57% - 41%
2024	President	Trump 57% - 42%
2024	Governor	Stein 49% - 45%
2024	Lt. Governor	Weatherman 53% - 44%
2024	Secretary of State	Brown 56% - 44%
2024	Auditor	Boliek 55% - 42%
2024	Treasurer	Briner 58% - 42%
2024	Attorney General	Bishop 54% - 46%

== List of members representing the district ==
Member (Residence)	Party	Years	Cong ress	Electoral history	District location
District established January 3, 2023
Jeff Jackson (Charlotte)	Democratic	January 3, 2023 – December 31, 2024	118th	Elected in 2022. Resigned after being elected attorney general of North Carolina.	2023–2025 Parts of Gaston and Mecklenburg
Vacant		December 31, 2024 – January 3, 2025	118th		2023–2025 Parts of Gaston and Mecklenburg
Tim Moore (Kings Mountain)	Republican	January 3, 2025 – present	119th	Elected in 2024. Lost re-election.	2025–present
LaKesha Womack	Democratic	Taking office on January 3, 2027		Elected in 2026.	

== Past election results ==
=== 2022 ===
2022 North Carolina's 14th congressional district election
Party	Candidate	Votes	%
Democratic	Jeff Jackson	148,738	57.7
Republican	Pat Harrigan	109,014	42.3
Total votes		257,752	100.00
Democratic win (new seat)			

=== 2024 ===
2024 North Carolina's 14th congressional district election
Party	Candidate	Votes	%
Republican	Tim Moore	232,987	58.1
Democratic	Pam Genant	168,269	41.9
Total votes		401,256	100.0
Republican gain from Democratic			

== In popular culture ==
In the 2012 political satire film The Campaign, Democratic Congressman Camden Brady represents North Carolina's then-fictional 14th congressional district.

== See also ==
- List of United States congressional districts
- North Carolina's congressional districts
