= Young Democrats of North Carolina =

Youth arm of the North Carolina Democratic Party

- President: Nathan Linville (Davie)
- Executive Vice President: Tenae Turner (Alamance)
- Founded: 1928; 98 years ago
- Headquarters: North Carolina
- Membership: Democrats ages 18-35
- Ideology: Modern Liberalism; Progressivism; Left-wing populism
- Position: Center-left
- Mother party: North Carolina Democratic Party
- National affiliation: Young Democrats of America
- Website: https://ydnc.org

Formed in 1928, the Young Democrats of North Carolina is the oldest Young Democrats chapter in America. It founded the Young Democrats of America.

It actively engages North Carolina Democrats from the ages of 18 to 36 who have an active interest in governmental affairs, who are seeking a mechanism for satisfying political expression, and who want to make the members of the Democratic Party aware that young people intend to take an active role in party affairs.

== Campaign role ==
The Young Democrats of North Carolina (YDNC) is responsible for party organizational activity among North Carolina Democrats ages 18 to 36. In elections, it coordinates with state and local candidates, raises funds, and coordinates campaign strategy to bolster youth turnout.

YDNC currently was composed of 27 county chapters (at the time of the 2025 Statewide Convention, held in Fayetteville, North Carolina).

In Spring 2018, YDNC launched the Cardinal Candidates program aimed at increasing the turnout of young voters in districts where Young Democrats are running for office. The program targeted 26 Congressional and state legislative districts across the state.

== State Conventions ==
YDNC holds its State Convention at a different location every year. At Convention, the organization holds trainings, networking receptions, and elections for statewide officers. In recent years, the YDNC has co-hosted the convention with the College Democrats of North Carolina and the North Carolina Association of Teen Democrats.

Past Conventions

- 2026: YDNC’s convention was hosted in Charlotte, North Carolina. It primarily featured speakers from the Mecklenburg area, such as Alma Adams. Other speakers included Paul Barringer and Winn Decker. It was chaired by Justin Matthews and Matt Hughes.
- In 2025, YDNC held its annual State Convention in Fayetteville, bringing together young Democrats, party leaders, and elected officials from across the state for a weekend of trainings and officer elections. The Convention featured remarks from Boone Mayor Pro Tem Dalton George, NC Democrats Chair Anderson Clayton, and other alumni, highlighted the organization's continued growth at the county level, and focused heavily on voter engagement and leadership development ahead of the 2025 municipal election cycle. Delegates also elected statewide officers and adopted organizational priorities, reinforcing YDNC's role as a driving force for youth engagement within the North Carolina Democratic Party.
- 2024, Durham. Speakers included Council of State incumbents Governor Roy Cooper, Attorney General Josh Stein, Secretary Elaine Marshall, and Auditor Jessica Holmes. Additionally, House Democratic Leader Robert T. Reives II, Senate Democratic Leader Dan Blue, NC Democrats Chair Anderson Clayton, and Young Democrats of America President Quentin Wathum-Ocama were featured speakers.
- 2023, Morganton. Featured a wide range of YDNC alumni, including: Secretary Elaine Marshall, Morganton Mayor Ronnie Thompson, Representative Lindsey Prather, former Representative Chaz Beasley, Representative Wesley Harris, Durham Commissioner Nida Allam, Hillsborough Commissioner Matt Hughes, Fletcher Mayor Preston Blakely, Boone Councilman Dalton George, NC Democrats Chair Anderson Clayton, and former YDNC presidents and political strategists Conen Morgan and Grayson Barnette.
- 2022, Winston-Salem, North Carolina. Featured NC Supreme Court Associate Justice Sam Ervin IV as the Keynote Speaker.
- 2018, 90th Anniversary State Convention on the campus of the University of North Carolina at Charlotte. Senator Vin Gopal and Mayor Vi Lyles served as keynote speakers.
- 2017, held at the University of North Carolina at Greensboro. Featured Mayor Pete Buttigieg as the keynote speaker.
- 2016, Raleigh, North Carolina. Featured then-Attorney General Roy Cooper as the keynote speaker.
- 2014, Greenville, North Carolina. Featured U.S. Senator Kay Hagan and NC Attorney General Roy Cooper.
- 2008, 80th Anniversary Statewide Convention in which a record 600+ people attended. Guest speakers included Chelsea Clinton, James Carville and John Edwards. Although this was the first time Edwards spoke publicly after he resigned his campaign, he did not endorse either Hillary Clinton or Barack Obama for the Democratic presidential nomination.

== Leadership and Board of Trustees ==
YDNC elects statewide officers at the yearly YDNC convention. Additionally, it appoints leaders on a yearly basis to serve on a board of trustees. The late Governor Jim Hunt, a former Young Democrats of North Carolina President, serves as the Honorary Chair of the YDNC Board of Trustees. This board serves in an advisory role to YDNC, and assists in fund raising efforts.

2025–26 Executive Officers:

- President: Adrian Brakeley of Johnston County
- Executive Vice President: Christopher Petty of Lee County
- Western Regional Vice President: Sydnie Hutchinson of Gaston County
- Piedmont Regional Vice President: Autumn Solomon of Union County
- Triangle Regional Vice President: Daniel Franch of Johnston County
- Eastern Regional Vice President: Mario Benavente of Cumberland County
- Young Democrats of America National Committee Representative (Seat 1): Kristen Robinson of Buncombe County
- Young Democrats of America National Committee Representative (Seat 2): Elijah Mears of Guilford County
- Secretary: Liz Purvis of Granville County
- Treasurer: Siara Divel of Onslow County
- Communications Director: Tenae Turner of Alamance County
- Finance Director: Joey Melone of Buncombe County
- Membership Director: Mac Schauman of Wake County

2024–25 Executive Officers:

- President: Dorian Palmer of Burke County
- Executive Vice President: Anna Rios of Alamance County
- Western Regional Vice President: Jesse Ross of Haywood County
- Piedmont Regional Vice President: Autumn Solomon of Union County
- Triangle Regional Vice President: Daniel Franch of Johnston County
- Eastern Regional Vice President: Mario Benavente of Cumberland County
- Young Democrats of America National Committee Representative (Seat 1): Elijah Mears of Rowan County
- Young Democrats of America National Committee Representative (Seat 2): Kristen Robinson of Buncombe County
- Secretary: Liz Purvis of Granville County
- Treasurer: Siara Divel of New Hanover County
- Communications Director: Garrett Readling of Cabarrus County
- Deputy Communications Director: Tenae Turner of Alamance County
- Finance Director: Joey Melone of Buncombe County

2023–24 Executive Officers:

- President: Dorian Palmer of Burke County
- Executive Vice President: Anna Rios of Alamance County
- Western Regional Vice President: Jesse Ross of Haywood County
- Piedmont Regional Vice President: Autumn Solomon of Union County
- Triangle Regional Vice President: Daniel Franch of Johnston County
- Eastern Regional Vice President: Mario Benavente of Cumberland County
- Young Democrats of America National Committee Representative (Seat 1): Elijah Mears of Rowan County
- Young Democrats of America National Committee Representative (Seat 2): Kristen Robinson of Buncombe County
- Secretary: Liz Purvis of Granville County
- Treasurer: Siara Divel of New Hanover County
- Communications Director: Garrett Readling of Cabarrus County
- Deputy Communications Director: Tenae Turner of Alamance County
- Finance Director: Joey Melone of Buncombe County

== Notable alumni ==
=== Former presidents ===
- Former US Senator and Governor Terry Sanford (1950)
- Former Governor Jim Hunt (1968)
- Former NC Board of Elections Chair Larry Leake (1979)
- Morganton Mayor Ronnie Thompson (1984)
- Former NCDP Chair David P. Parker (1985)
- Commissioner of the NC DMV and former North Carolina Democratic Party Chair Wayne Goodwin (1996)
- Democratic Strategist Morgan Jackson (1999)
- Democratic Strategist and Lobbyist Courtney Crowder (2003–2004)
- Democratic Strategist and Lobbyist Tony McEwen (2005–2006)
- North Carolina State Representative Zack Hawkins (HD-31) (2007–2008)
- Democratic Strategist Conen Morgan (2009–2010)

=== Notable Members ===
- US Senate Candidate Cal Cunningham
- Governor Roy Cooper
- Secretary of State Elaine Marshall
- NCDP Chair Anderson Clayton (current)
- Congressman Don Davis
- Representative Lindsey Prather
- Attorney General Jeff Jackson
- Councilman Matt Hughes
- Canton Mayor Zeb Smathers
- Boone Mayor Dalton George

== Legislative work ==
YDNC has worked to pass House Bill 91, In-Person Registration and Voting. The new law allows voters to register up to three days before Election Day, down from 25 days under the old law. The measure also provides several safeguards to ensure the integrity of voter registration and toughens criminal penalties for those who commit fraud.

== Mascot ==
The official mascot of the YDNC is "Liberty" the cardinal, inspired by the North Carolina state bird.

Previously their mascot was the "fearless" honey badger, since "Young Democrats are also devoid of fear."

== See also ==
- Young Republicans
- North Carolina Democratic Party
