= Red Wine & Blue =

Political organization

- Abbreviation: RWB
- Formation: 2019
- Founder: Katie Paris
- Type: 501(c)(4) with independent political action committee
- Purpose: political mobilization
- Headquarters: Ohio
- Subsidiaries: The Suburban Women Problem Podcast; SWEEP (Suburban Women Engaged, Empowered, and Pissed) Facebook Group
- Website: redwine.blue

Red Wine & Blue (RWB) is a politically left-wing 501(c)(4) organization founded by Katie Paris after the 2018 United States elections. Operating out of suburban swing districts in the United States, RWB engages women at a grassroots level and drives media narratives to better reflect issues faced by the "everyday woman".

The organization manages a weekly podcast "The Suburban Women Problem", a 215,000-member Facebook group, SWEEP (Suburban Women Engaged, Empowered, and Pissed), and publishes a weekly newsletter, The Sip.

== History ==
=== Founding ===
Red Wine & Blue began its organizing efforts in 2019 with a plan to engage “concerned but unconnected” suburban voters in local races across Ohio. Paris told Buzzfeed News at the time that the group was using these local campaigns to build a roadmap for Democrats to win back Ohio in the 2020 presidential election.

By 2020, a dozen groups in 12 suburban Ohio counties joined the Red Wine & Blue network, and the group began to hold in-person rallies. They also hosted Facebook Live conversations with Ohio Congressional candidates and participated in a friend-to-friend texting program to turn out the vote.

Red Wine & Blue continued their organizing in Ohio following the 2020 elections. In 2021, the group held a read-in at the State Board of Education to counterprotest an anti-critical race theory demonstration, and called on Ohio REALTORS to stop financially supporting Republican state lawmakers that backed a legislative ban on teaching "divisive concepts" in K–12 schools.

=== National expansion ===
The same year, Red Wine & Blue announced its intended expansion in Arizona, Georgia, North Carolina, Pennsylvania, and Wisconsin while still maintaining a presence in its headquarters state.
