= Chuck Hubbard =

American politician and reporter (born 1962)

- Hubbard in 2026

Member-elect of the U.S. House of Representatives from North Carolina's 5th district
- Assuming office January 3, 2027
- Succeeding: Virginia Foxx

Personal details
- Born: Charles Noble Hubbard; 1961 or 1962 (age 64–65) Bryson City, North Carolina, U.S.
- Party: Democratic
- Spouse: Shari Hubbard
- Children: 3
- Education: Wofford College (BA)
- Website: https://hubbardforcongress.com/

Charles Noble Hubbard (born 1961 or 1962) is an American politician and former newspaper reporter from North Carolina. He was the Democratic Party nominee for the North Carolina House of Representatives in the 94th district in the 2022 election, and for the U.S. House of Representatives from North Carolina's 5th congressional district in the 2024 and 2026 elections.

== Early life and education ==
Hubbard was born in Bryson City, North Carolina, to John White Hubbard and Rebecca S. Hubbard. His father was a newspaper publisher, of the Wilkes Journal-Patriot and The Alleghany News; the former was founded by his paternal grandfather, Julius C. Hubbard, in 1932. Hubbard earned a bachelor's from Wofford College, and later worked as a local journalist.

== Political career ==
Hubbard's first political campaign was in 2022 as the Democratic nominee for the NC House in North Carolina's 94th district. After advancing in an unopposed primary, he lost the general election to the incumbent, Republican Jeffrey Elmore.

In 2024, he won the Democratic nomination for the U.S. House in North Carolina's fifth congressional district. As a significant underdog, he lost to the incumbent, Virginia Foxx, by 19 points in the general election. Despite the loss, he was the first Democratic nominee to receive over 40% of the vote against Foxx since the 2018 midterm election.

Hubbard ran for the Democratic nomination again in 2026 in a newly drawn 5th District; the Democratic primary included one other candidate, community organizer Kyah Creekmore. On March 3, 2026, Hubbard defeated Creekmore for the nomination by 13 points (6,070 votes).

During the general election campaign, the Cook Political Report shifted the race from solid Republican to likely Republican; it was the first time since 2016 that the site had shifted the race away from Foxx. On election night, Hubbard had an unofficial 99-vote lead over Foxx. After absentee, military, and provisional ballots were counted, Hubbard's lead grew to 331 votes, or 0.12%, out of 286,788 votes cast. Foxx requested a recount, which reduced Hubbard's margin of victory by only one vote. Foxx conceded on November 22.

== Personal life ==
Hubbard lives in Wilkesboro with his wife, Shari; they have three children and two grandchildren.

== Electoral history ==
2026 North Carolina's 5th congressional district election
Party	Candidate	Votes	%	±%
Democratic	Chuck Hubbard	139,769	48.7%	
Republican	Virginia Foxx (incumbent)	139,439	48.6%	
Libertarian	Robert Luffman	7,578	2.6%	
Total votes		286,786	100.0%	

2024 North Carolina's 5th congressional district election
Party	Candidate	Votes	%
Republican	Virginia Foxx (incumbent)	238,304	59.5
Democratic	Chuck Hubbard	162,390	40.5
Total votes		400,694	100.0
Republican hold			

North Carolina House of Representatives 94th district general election, 2022
Party	Candidate	Votes	%
Republican	Jeffrey Elmore (incumbent)	27,924	80.07%
Democratic	Chuck Hubbard	6,952	19.93%
Total votes		34,876	100%
Republican hold			

U.S. House of Representatives
Preceded by Virginia Foxx	Member of the U.S. House of Representatives from North Carolina's 5th congressional district Taking office 2027	Elect
