= LaKesha Womack =

American minister and political activist

- Womack in 2026

Member-elect of the U.S. House of Representatives from North Carolina's 14th district
- Assuming office January 3, 2027
- Succeeding: Tim Moore

Personal details
- Born: 1976 or 1977 (age 49–50) Alabama, U.S.
- Party: Democratic
- Children: 1
- Education: Vanderbilt University (BA)

LaKesha Shanese Womack (born 1976 or 1977) is an American business consultant, minister, and politician who is the member-elect of Congress for North Carolina's 14th congressional district.

== Early life and education ==
Womack was born in 1976 or 1977 in Alabama, and grew up in Evergreen. She earned a high school diploma from the Alabama School of Mathematics and Science and a bachelor's degree in political science from Vanderbilt University in 1999.

== Career ==
Womack worked as a business consultant, a deacon, and producer of her show, "Courageous Conversations with Rev. LaKesha Womack". She has also said she was attending Vanderbilt for her Master of Legal Studies. She is the author of several books.

Womack has said she moved to North Carolina in 2016 to support Hillary Clinton's presidential campaign and has lived there since.

Womack served as Chief Strategy Officer for ASPIRE Community Capital, a community development financial institution focused on microloans, immediately before her election. In 2020, she became an ordained minister.

Womack was the Democratic nominee for the U.S. House of Representatives in 2026 in North Carolina's 14th congressional district. She seemed to face daunting odds. The Republican incumbent, former state house speaker Tim Moore, had won in 2024 by over 16 points after the third round of redistricting of the decade made it heavily Republican. Womack was also dramatically outspent, raising $59,000 to Moore's $2.1 million. But Womack won in a massive upset. While she only won one of the district's six counties, it was her home of Mecklenburg County, which she won by 35,800 votes, almost nine times her overall margin of 6,400 votes. Moore's support in the remaining counties shrank from two years earlier, contributing to Womack's victory.

Womack was one of six Democratic challengers to unseat Republican incumbents on a map intended to give the GOP 11 of the state's 14 seats. She later said that with no money to run ads, she focused on grassroots campaigning. She said she focused her efforts on "the missing middle" who struggled to get ahead.

== Personal life ==
She has a son. She has Type 1 diabetes. In 2017, she suffered a diabetic seizure; the resulting prolonged hospital stay left her in poor financial condition. Her son was temporarily placed in foster care during her hospitalization. By 2019, Womack was homeless and living in a motel.

In 2026, she was served with a criminal summons; prosecutors alleged she had not returned a rental vehicle on time in 2019. The court had sought to serve her in January 2020 but was unable to do so as she was homeless at the time and living out of a hotel. Her attorneys appeared in court on November 10, 2026, and a probable cause hearing is set for December 1.

== Political positions ==
During her 2026 campaign, Womack emphasized rural healthcare as her most important policy goal along with engagement in town halls.

U.S. House of Representatives
Preceded by Tim Moore	Member of the U.S. House of Representatives from North Carolina's 14th congressional district Taking office 2027	Elect
