= Paul Barringer (politician) =

American attorney and politician

- Barringer in 2026

Member-elect of the U.S. House of Representatives from North Carolina's 13th district
- Assuming office January 3, 2027
- Succeeding: Brad Knott

Personal details
- Born: July 7, 1967 (age 59)
- Party: Democratic (2025–present)
- Other political affiliations: Republican (before 2025)
- Education: Davidson College (BA); Princeton University (MPA); University of North Carolina, Chapel Hill (JD); Victoria University of Wellington (MA)

Paul Jehu Barringer III (born July 7, 1967) is an American attorney and politician from North Carolina. Previously a Republican, he switched to the Democratic Party after donating to the presidential campaign of U.S. Senator Bernie Sanders in 2016. In the 2026 midterm election for North Carolina's 13th congressional district, he defeated Republican incumbent Brad Knott.

== Early life ==
Barringer is from Sanford, North Carolina and is the son of Jane (née Swindell) and Paul J. Barringer Jr. He has a bachelor's in environmental history from Davidson College, a Master of Public Administration from the Princeton School of Public and International Affairs, a Juris Doctor degree from the University of North Carolina School of Law and a master's in health policy from Victoria University of Wellington on a Rotary Scholarship.

U.S. House of Representatives
Preceded by Brad Knott	Member of the U.S. House of Representatives from North Carolina's 13th congressional district Taking office 2027	Elect
