= Senator Gudger =

Senator Gudger may refer to:

- Garlan Gudger (born 1975), Alabama State Senate
- James M. Gudger Jr. (1855–1920), North Carolina State Senate
- V. Lamar Gudger (1919–2004), North Carolina State Senate
