= James M. Clarke =

American politician

Jamie Clarke
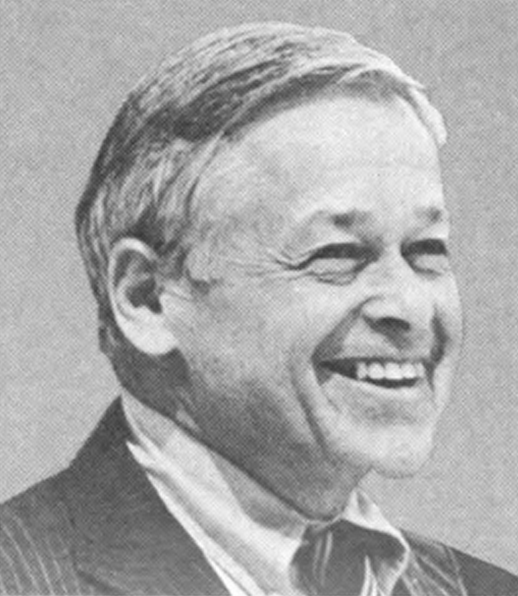

Member of the U.S. House of Representatives from North Carolina's 11th district
- In office January 3, 1987 – January 3, 1991
- Preceded by: Bill Hendon
- Succeeded by: Charles Taylor
- In office January 3, 1983 – January 3, 1985
- Preceded by: Bill Hendon
- Succeeded by: Bill Hendon

Member of the North Carolina Senate from the 26th district
- In office January 1981 – January 1983
- Preceded by: Larry Leake
- Succeeded by: Cass Ballenger; William Redman

Member of the North Carolina House of Representatives from the 43rd district
- In office January 1977 – January 1981
- Preceded by: Herbert Hyde; John Stevens
- Succeeded by: Narvel Crawford

Personal details
- Born: James McClure Clarke; June 12, 1917 Manchester, Vermont, U.S.
- Died: April 13, 1999 (aged 81) Fairview, North Carolina, U.S.
- Party: Democratic
- Spouse: Elspie Clarke
- Relatives: Eric Ager (grandson); Jamie Ager (grandson)
- Education: Princeton University (BA)

James McClure Clarke (June 12, 1917 – April 13, 1999) was a North Carolina politician and farmer. He served as a Democratic member of the United States House of Representatives.

== Early life ==
Born in Manchester, Vermont, Clarke grew up in Asheville, North Carolina. Clarke graduated with an A.B. in history from Princeton University in 1939 after completing a 78-page long senior thesis titled "The Princetonian: A History of College Life." He then served as a Lieutenant in the United States Navy during World War II in the Pacific from 1942 to 1945. After his service, Clarke worked as a dairy farmer and orchardist in western North Carolina. He became president of the Farmers Federation Cooperative in 1956.

== Political career ==
In 1976, Clarke was elected to the North Carolina House of Representatives as a Democrat. In 1980 he was elected to the North Carolina Senate. In the 1982 election Clarke was elected to the 98th United States Congress representing North Carolina's 11th congressional district. He was reelected to the 100th and 101st Congresses. In Congress, he was known as an advocate for the environment.

In the 1980s Clarke's congressional campaigns became nationally famous due to his long-running rivalry with Republican Bill Hendon. In 1982 Clarke defeated then-Congressman Hendon by less than 1,500 votes. In 1984 Hendon gained revenge by defeating Clarke's bid for a second term by just two percentage points. In 1986, Clarke defeated Hendon's bid for re-election by only one percentage point. Although Hendon then retired from politics, Clarke's seat remained competitive. In 1988 Republican Charles H. Taylor came within one percentage point of defeating Clarke; in 1990 Taylor unseated Clarke in another close election. Given his age (he was 73 at the time of his loss to Taylor), Clarke decided to retire from politics.

== Personal life ==
Clarke's family farm is still operating today as Hickory Nut Gap Farms in Fairview, North Carolina. His grandson, Eric Ager, currently represents Buncombe County in the North Carolina House of Representatives, after succeeding Clarke's son-in-law, John Ager. Another grandson, Jamie, is running for the 11th district in 2026.

U.S. House of Representatives
Preceded by Bill Hendon	Member of the U.S. House of Representatives from North Carolina's 11th congressional district 1983–1985	Succeeded by Bill Hendon
Preceded by Bill Hendon	Member of the U.S. House of Representatives from North Carolina's 11th congressional district 1987–1991	Succeeded by Charles Taylor
