= Caleb Rudow =

American politician

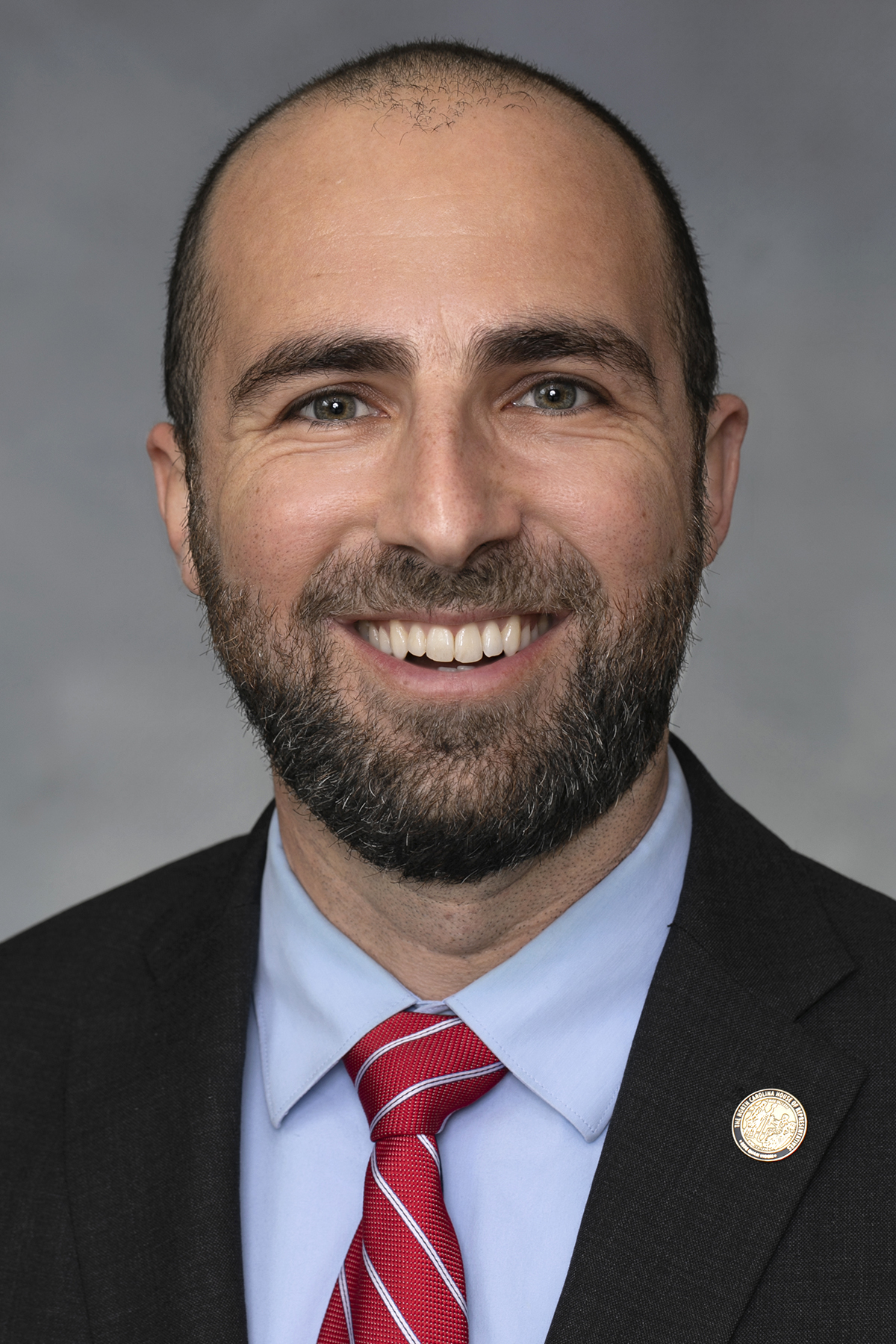

Member of the North Carolina House of Representatives
- In office February 1, 2022 – January 1, 2025
- Preceded by: Susan Fisher
- Succeeded by: Brian Turner
- Constituency: 114th district (2022–2023); 116th district (2023–2025)

Personal details
- Party: Democratic
- Education: University of North Carolina, Chapel Hill (BA); University of Texas, Austin (MA)

Caleb Rudow is an American politician who previously served as a member of the North Carolina House of Representatives from the 114th and later 116th district. He was appointed on February 1, 2022, succeeding Susan Fisher.

== Early life and education ==
A native of Asheville, North Carolina, Rudow graduated from Asheville High School in 2005. He earned a Bachelor of Arts degree in philosophy from the University of North Carolina at Chapel Hill and a Master of Arts in global policy studies from the University of Texas at Austin.

== Career ==
From 2008 to 2011, Rudow worked as a manager at a gardening company.

From 2012 to 2014, he served as a Peace Corps volunteer in Zambia. He continued his work in Zambia as a member of the United States Agency for International Development (USAID) Zambia Economic Development Team until 2015.

In 2018, he worked as a consultant with the World Bank Group. He was also a research fellow at the Center for Open Data Enterprise in Washington, D.C.

In 2019 and 2020, he was a regional organizing coordinator for Swing Left.

From August to October 2020, he was a census enumerator for the United States Census Bureau.

Rudow joined Open Data Watch in 2018 and has since worked as a program assistant and data analyst until leaving the organization in July 2021. In 2021, he worked as a COVID-19 case investigator for Community Care of North Carolina.

He was appointed to the North Carolina House of Representatives in February 2022.

In 2023, Rudow announced a run for North Carolina's 11th congressional district. He was unopposed in the primary and faced incumbent Chuck Edwards in the 2024 General Election to whom he lost.

== Electoral history ==
=== 2024 ===
North Carolina's 11th congressional district election, 2024
Party	Candidate	Votes	%
Republican	Chuck Edwards (incumbent)	245,546	56.77%
Democratic	Caleb Rudow	186,977	43.23%
Total votes		432,523	100%
Republican hold			

=== 2022 ===
North Carolina House of Representatives 116th district general election, 2022
Party	Candidate	Votes	%
Democratic	Caleb Rudow (incumbent)	25,161	62.36%
Republican	Mollie Rose	15,185	37.64%
Total votes		40,346	100%
Democratic hold			

North Carolina House of Representatives
Preceded by Susan Fisher	Member of the North Carolina House of Representatives from the 114th district 2022–2023	Succeeded by Eric Ager
Preceded by Brian Turner	Member of the North Carolina House of Representatives from the 116th district 2023–2025	Succeeded by Brian Turner
