= A. C. Reynolds High School =

American public school in North Carolina

Location
- 1 Rocket Drive; Asheville, North Carolina 28803; United States; 35°32′46″N 82°28′36″W

Information
- Type: Public
- Established: 1956 (70 years ago)
- School district: Buncombe County Schools System
- CEEB code: 340112
- Principal: Ben Alexander, EdS
- Teaching staff: 67.07 (on an FTE basis)
- Enrollment: 1,156 (2023-2024)
- Student to teacher ratio: 17.24
- Campus type: Suburban
- Colors: Green and Gold
- Mascot: Rocket
- Newspaper: Cedar Cliff Notes
- Website: acrhs.buncombeschools.org

A. C. Reynolds High School is a public secondary school located in Asheville, North Carolina. The school accommodates grades 9-12 and is a part of the Buncombe County Schools System. Its mascot is a Rocket.

== History ==
The school was named after Alonzo Carlton "A.C." Reynolds (1870–1953), who had a 53 year career in education.

== Honors ==
A. C. Reynolds High School was honored as a National Blue Ribbon School in 2002.

== Notable alumni ==
- Jamie Ager, member-elect of the U.S. House of Representatives from North Carolina's 11th district
- Eric Ager, US Navy Commander (retired) and member of North Carolina General Assembly
- Karl Anderson, professional wrestler
- Luke Combs, country music singer-songwriter
- Rico Dowdle, NFL running back
- Cooper Ingle, MLB catcher and outfielder
- Ben Johnson, NFL head coach of the Chicago Bears
- Maria Fletcher, 1962 Miss America
- D. Bruce Goforth, former member of the North Carolina General Assembly
- J. Adam Lowe, professor and state senator
- Caleb Pressley, blogger, podcaster and interviewer, former employee of Barstool Sports
- Chase Rice, country music singer-songwriter and television personality
