= Heath Shuler =

American football player and politician (born 1971)

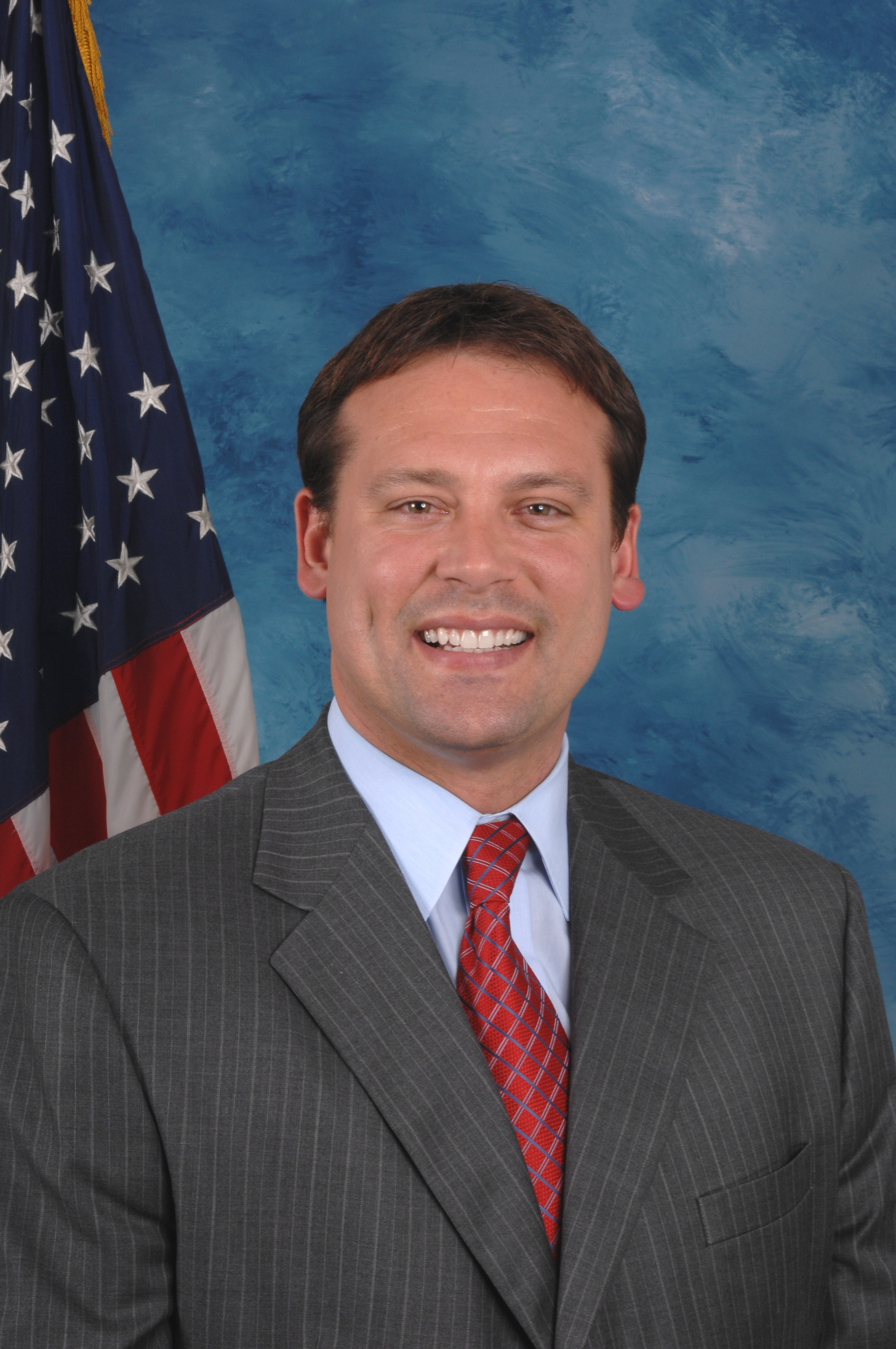
- Official portrait, 2007

Member of the U.S. House of Representatives from North Carolina's 11th district
- In office January 3, 2007 – January 3, 2013
- Preceded by: Charles H. Taylor
- Succeeded by: Mark Meadows

Personal details
- Born: Joseph Heath Shuler; December 31, 1971 (age 54) Bryson City, North Carolina, U.S.
- Party: Democratic
- Spouse: Nikol Davis
- Children: 2
- Education: University of Tennessee, Knoxville (BA)
- Football career

No. 21, 5
- Position: Quarterback

Personal information
- Listed height: 6 ft 2 in (1.88 m)
- Listed weight: 216 lb (98 kg)

Career information
- High school: Swain County (Bryson City)
- College: Tennessee (1991–1993)
- NFL draft: 1994: 1st round, 3rd overall pick

Career history
- Washington Redskins (1994–1996); New Orleans Saints (1997–1998); Oakland Raiders (1999)*
- * Offseason or practice squad member only

Awards and highlights
- PFWA All-Rookie Team (1994); Second-team All-American (1993); SEC Player of the Year (1993); First-team All-SEC (1993); Hall of Fame Bowl MVP

Career NFL statistics
- Passing attempts: 593
- Passing completions: 292
- Completion percentage: 49.2%
- TD–INT: 15–33
- Passing yards: 3,691
- Passer rating: 54.3
- Stats at Pro Football Reference

Joseph Heath Shuler (born December 31, 1971) is an American former politician and professional football quarterback who served as the U.S. representative for North Carolina's 11th congressional district from 2007 to 2013. The district covers the Blue Ridge Mountains in Western North Carolina. A member of the Democratic Party, he played in the National Football League (NFL) for five seasons prior to his political career.

Shuler played college football at the University of Tennessee, winning SEC Player of the Year in 1993, and was selected by the Washington Redskins third overall in the 1994 NFL draft. Unable to match his collegiate success, he was traded from the Redskins after three seasons and spent his final two with the New Orleans Saints.

Shuler launched his first political campaign during the 2006 House elections and defeated Republican incumbent Charles H. Taylor. During his Congressional tenure, he was a member of the Blue Dog Coalition and known for challenging the leadership of his party, including running against Nancy Pelosi for Democratic leader in 2010. After his district was redrawn in 2011 to replace much of his Democratic support from Asheville with several Republican counties, Shuler announced he would not seek re-election the following year. He retired from politics after his term ended.

== Early life ==
Shuler was born in Bryson City, North Carolina, a small town in the Great Smoky Mountains near the Tennessee border. His father was a mail carrier and his mother a homemaker and volunteer with the Swain County Youth Association; he has a younger brother, Benjie.

Shuler's athletic career began at Swain County High School in Bryson City. A standout quarterback who led his team to three NCHSAA 1A state championships, he was named as the North Carolina High School Player of the Year. He attracted scout attention and accepted an athletic scholarship to the University of Tennessee in 1990.

== College football career ==
Under head coaches Johnny Majors and Phillip Fulmer, Shuler gained national attention as one of the SEC's top quarterbacks. After a limited role in the 1991 season behind quarterback Andy Kelly, he became a prolific passer. In the 1992 season, he passed for 1,712 passing yards, ten touchdowns, and four interceptions as Tennessee finished with a 9–3 record. The next season, he finished with 2,354 passing yards, 25 touchdowns, and eight interceptions as Tennessee finished with a 9–2–1 record. He held nearly all Volunteer passing records by the end of his collegiate career; most were subsequently eclipsed by Peyton Manning. In 1993, Shuler was the Southeastern Conference (SEC) player of the year and came in second behind Florida State quarterback Charlie Ward in the voting for the Heisman Trophy.

== Professional football career ==
Pre-draft measurables
| Height | Weight | Arm length | Hand span |
|---|---|---|---|
| 6 ft 2 in (1.88 m) | 221 lb (100 kg) | 31 1/2 in (0.80 m) | 10 5/8 in (0.27 m) |
All values from NFL Combine

Shuler was a first-round selection in the 1994 NFL draft, taken by the Washington Redskins with the third overall pick. He held out of training camp until he received a 7-year, $19.25 million contract, most of the holdout being due to Shuler's agent and the Redskins general manager discussing the parameters of the contract. The Redskins had fallen on hard times since winning Super Bowl XXVI, and Shuler was considered the quarterback of the future. However, Shuler's poor play contributed to a quarterback controversy with fellow 1994 draft pick, seventh-rounder Gus Frerotte. Public and fan sentiment soon began to back Frerotte, especially after Shuler threw five interceptions in a 19–16 loss to the Arizona Cardinals. Shuler started 18 games in his first two years with the team and was benched in his third year, as Frerotte led the team.

After the 1996 season, Shuler was traded to the New Orleans Saints for a fifth-round pick in the 1997 draft and a third-round pick in 1998. Shuler's statistics remained poor. He suffered a serious foot injury during the 1997 season in New Orleans and had two surgeries to try and correct it. Football statistics site Football Outsiders called Shuler "The least valuable quarterback of 1997." Shuler chose the Saints over the Green Bay Packers, who were also interested, because of the opportunity to start in New Orleans despite Washington GM Charley Casserly urging Shuler to pick the Packers because of their ability to develop quarterbacks.

After being unable to take the field due to his foot injury in his second season in New Orleans, Shuler signed with the Oakland Raiders. After re-injuring his foot in training camp, he was cut and later retired. As a professional, his career passer rating was a 54.3. In 2004, ESPN rated him the 17th biggest 'sports flop' of the past 25 years, along with the fourth biggest NFL draft bust. In 2007, the NFL Network ranked Shuler as the ninth-biggest bust in NFL history.

== Career statistics ==
Legend
| **Bold** | Career high |

=== NFL ===
| Year | Team | GP | Passing | | | | | | | | Rushing | | | | Sacked | | Fumbles | |
| Year | Team | GP | Cmp | Att | Pct | Yds | Avg | TD | Int | Rtg | Att | Yds | Avg | TD | Sck | Yds | Fum | Lost |
|---|---|---|---|---|---|---|---|---|---|---|---|---|---|---|---|---|---|---|
| 1994 | WAS | **11** | **120** | **265** | 45.3 | **1,658** | **6.3** | **10** | 12 | **59.6** | **26** | **101** | **4.0** | 0 | 12 | 83 | 3 | 3 |
| 1995 | WAS | 7 | 66 | 125 | **52.8** | 745 | 6.0 | 3 | 7 | 55.6 | 18 | 57 | 3.2 | 0 | 13 | 76 | 1 | 0 |
| 1996 | WAS | 1 | 0 | 0 | – | 0 | – | 0 | 0 | – | 1 | 0 | 0.0 | 0 | 0 | 0 | 1 | 1 |
| 1997 | NO | 10 | 106 | 203 | 52.2 | 1,288 | **6.3** | 2 | **14** | 46.6 | 22 | 38 | 1.7 | **1** | **21** | **132** | **8** | **5** |
| Career | | 29 | 292 | 593 | 49.2 | 3,691 | 6.2 | 15 | 33 | 54.3 | 67 | 198 | 3.0 | 1 | 46 | 291 | 13 | 9 |

=== College ===
| Year | Team | Passing | | | | | | | | |
| Year | Team | Cmp | Att | Pct | Yds | Avg | AY/A | TD | Int | Rtg |
|---|---|---|---|---|---|---|---|---|---|---|
| 1991 | Tennessee | 2 | 4 | 50.0 | 23 | 5.8 | **10.8** | 1 | 0 | **180.8** |
| 1992 | Tennessee | 130 | 224 | 58.0 | 1,712 | 7.6 | 7.7 | 10 | 4 | 133.4 |
| 1993 | Tennessee | **184** | **285** | **64.6** | **2,354** | **8.3** | 8.8 | **25** | **8** | 157.3 |
| Career | | 316 | 513 | 61.6 | 4,089 | 8.0 | 8.3 | 36 | 12 | 147.0 |

== Real estate career ==
After retiring from the NFL, Shuler returned to the University of Tennessee and completed his degree in psychology. He became a real estate professional in Knoxville, Tennessee. His real estate company was one of the largest independent firms in East Tennessee. In 2003, Shuler moved to Biltmore Forest, North Carolina.

== U.S. House of Representatives ==
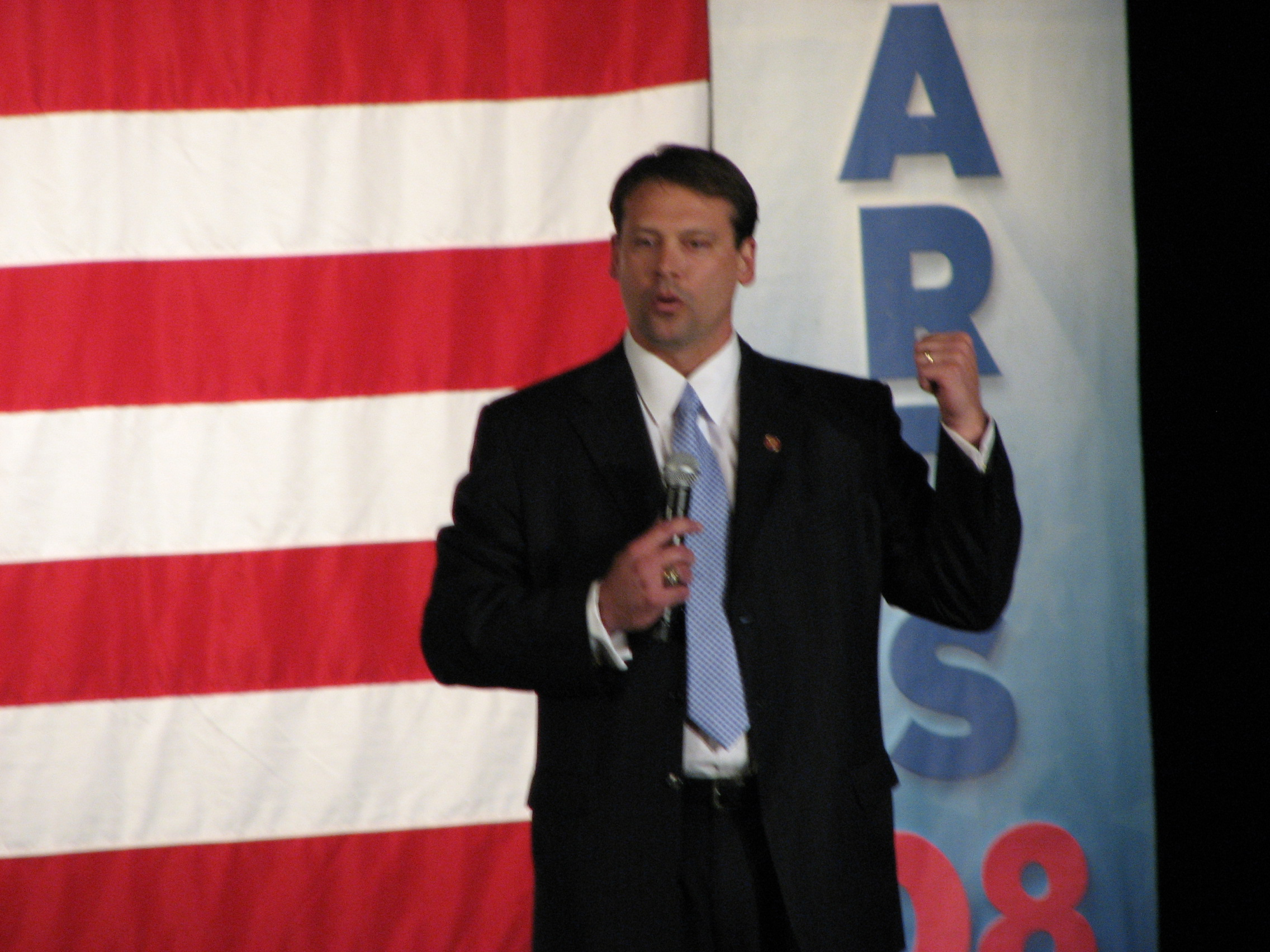
Shuler introducing John Edwards at an event for his 2008 presidential campaign

=== Elections ===
2006

In July 2005, Shuler announced his intention to seek the Democratic nomination to run against eight-term incumbent Republican Charles H. Taylor. North Carolina's 11th congressional district covered most of the Western North Carolina mountains where Shuler grew up.

Shuler was a tough target for opponents. His views on social issues were in line with the traditionally conservative district and he did not have a legislative record for opponents to attack. His campaign points were based on supporting cultural "mountain values:" opposing abortion rights, same-sex marriage and gun control. Taylor, an Appropriations subcommittee chairman, campaigned on his ability to bring federal money to the district. In October, with polls showing Taylor trailing, The Wall Street Journal ran a story about spending earmarks sought by Taylor that benefited many of his business interests. Taylor poured $2.5 million of his own money into his race, and spent $4.4 million overall, compared with Shuler's $1.8 million.

Shuler repeatedly attacked Taylor for failing to stand up for the 11th's interests. For example, he blasted Taylor for missing a vote on the Central American Free Trade Agreement, which passed by only two votes. Shuler pointed out that, according to the House roll call, Taylor voted 11 times on the same day that CAFTA came up for a vote, suggesting he deliberately avoided the vote. Taylor was one of two Republicans who did not vote on the bill, even though he had publicly opposed it in the past.

Taylor attempted to tie Shuler to House Democratic leader Nancy Pelosi, although Shuler was nearly as conservative on social issues as Taylor.

In the November election, Shuler won with 54 percent of the vote to Taylor's 46 percent. He carried nine of the district's 15 counties, including several that had reliably supported Taylor over the years. He even won Taylor's home county of Transylvania. Shuler was one of only two Democrats to defeat an incumbent in the South that year. His victory gave the Democrats a majority of the state's congressional delegation for the first time since the 1994 elections. North Carolina's 11th was one of thirty seats picked up by Democrats nationwide in 2006, giving them control of the House for the first time since 1994.

In 2009, a documentary film about the successful 2006 Democratic campaign to retake control of the House, HouseQuake, prominently featured then-Congressman Rahm Emanuel's efforts to recruit new candidates including Shuler. "Mr. Emanuel's efforts to get him to run offer one of the most revealing moments in the film," including two weeks of frequent phone calls about the balancing of family and Congressional obligations. The film was directed and produced by Karen Elizabeth Price, daughter of Congressman David Price who represented North Carolina's 4th congressional district.

2008

In 2008, Shuler faced Carl Mumpower, a Republican Asheville city councilman, and Libertarian Keith Smith. Shuler won strongly with 62 percent of the vote. He easily carried all 15 counties in the district, including the traditionally Republican Henderson County.

2010

In early 2009, Shuler was mentioned as a possible candidate to run against incumbent Republican Richard Burr for the United States Senate in the next year's elections. He ultimately chose not to do so, and sought reelection to the House. Shuler defeated Republican nominee Jeff Miller, winning reelection by a margin of 54% to 46%.

2012

Although Shuler represented a district with a slight Republican bent, he had a lifetime ACU rating of 28.5.

In July 2011, the Republican-dominated General Assembly significantly redrew the 11th. The district and its predecessors had been anchored in Asheville for over a century. However, the new map saw most of heavily Democratic Asheville drawn into the 10th. To make up for the population loss, a number of heavily Republican counties in the Foothills were moved to the 11th. The redistricting reduced the percentage of registered Democrats in the 11th from 43% to 36%. Chris Cooper, a political science professor at Western Carolina University, concluded that the new district was so heavily Republican that Shuler would need to "practically completely separate himself from the Democratic party" in order to have any chance of winning a fourth term. Years later, NBC News also concluded that the redrawn 11th was all but unwinnable for a Democrat, even one as conservative as Shuler. The map was drawn in a way that a number of neighborhoods in Asheville, and even streets, were split between the two districts. In some parts of Asheville, one side of the street moved to the 10th while the other side remained in the 11th.

Over the course of 2011, several persons declared their candidacy for Shuler's seat or expressed interest in a possible run.

On February 2, 2012, Shuler announced that he would not run for another term. He endorsed his former chief of staff, Hayden Rogers, in the race to succeed him. However, as expected, Rogers found the new 11th's redder hue impossible to overcome, and was heavily defeated by Republican Mark Meadows. Years later, Shuler told NBC News that the kind of ultra-precise redistricting that enabled the Republican-dominated legislature to split Asheville between two districts was bad for the country because it made it all but impossible to elect moderates to Congress. He argued that a fairer redistricting system was "the single greatest thing that could happen". Underscoring how Republican the district now was, Shuler would be the last Democrat to win as much as 40 percent of the district's vote until 2020, when the district regained all of Asheville.

=== Tenure ===
Ideology

Shuler was a leader of the Blue Dog Coalition, a caucus of moderate-to-conservative House Democrats, initially serving as whip, and eventually rising to the role as co-chairman.

A list of bills sponsored by Shuler in the 112th Congress includes H.R.3065, the Target Practice and Marksmanship Training Support Act; H.R.2086, the Medical Debt Responsibility Act of 2011; H.R.2000, the SAVE Act of 2011: H.R. 1889, the Gas Tax Holiday Act; and H.R.1434, the International Child Protection Act of 2011.

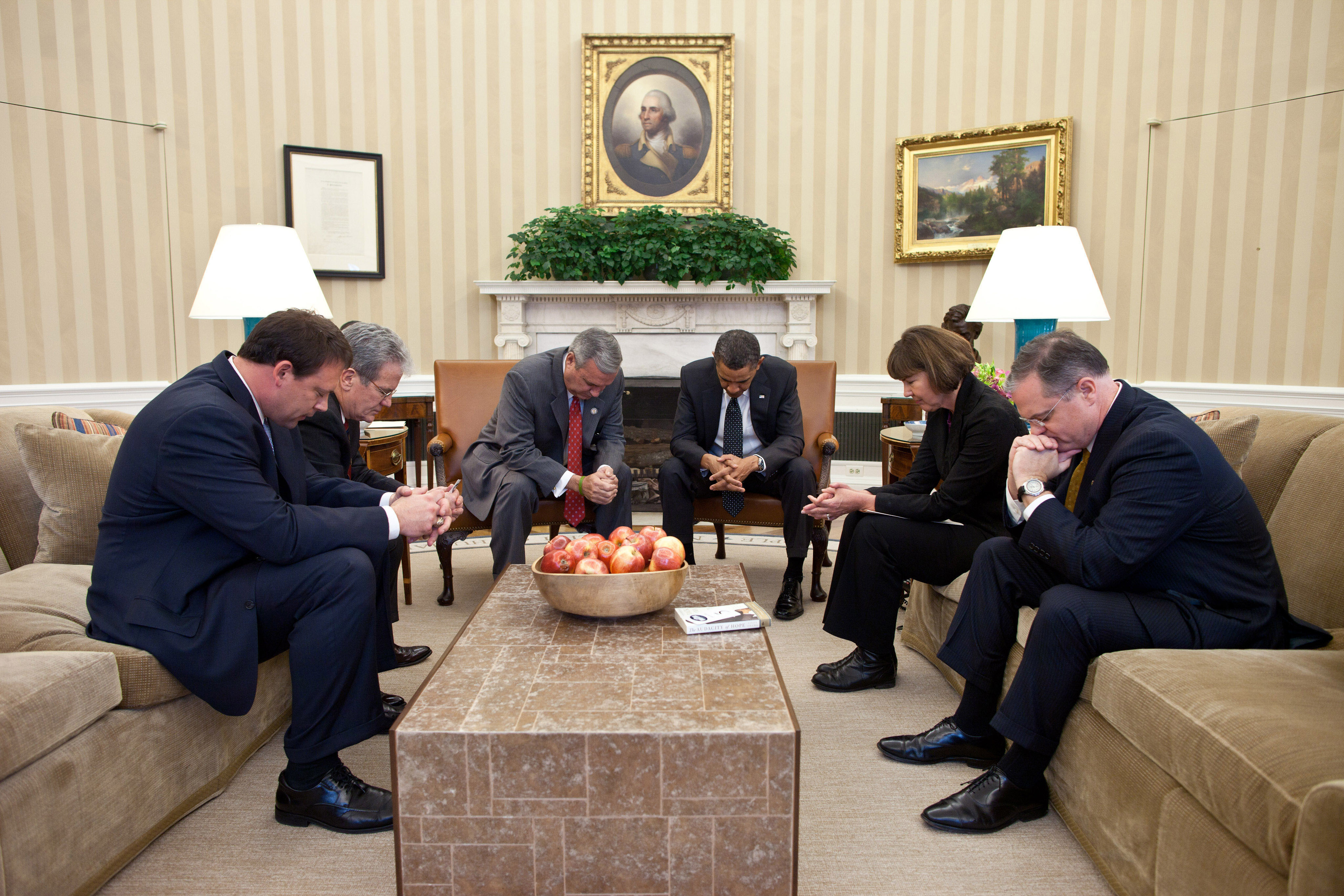
President Obama prays with Shuler (left) and other leaders of the Congressional Prayer Breakfast in the Oval Office in 2012

In 2011, Shuler led a group of House Democrats in pressuring the President to deal with the AT&T and T-Mobile merger. The group pushed for the lawsuit to be settled by the Department of Justice. The group sided with the claim made by AT&T that the merger would create much-needed jobs.

In November 2011, Shuler took the lead in a bipartisan call calling for larger cuts of the U.S. deficit.

In 2007, Shuler introduced proposed legislation co-sponsored with fellow North Carolina U.S. Congressman Walter Jones to require airlines to have sections of the aircraft where large movie screens would not be visible.

Representative Shuler has also been a major supporter of the government of Sri Lanka in Congress.

Reportedly owing to his success in real estate, Shuler was named chairman of the House Small Business Subcommittee on Rural and Urban Entrepreneurship during the 110th and 111th Congresses. He has also been a deputy-at-large Whip.

Key votes during economic recession

Shuler voted against the Emergency Economic Stabilization Act of 2008 both times it came before the House. He later joined seven other conservative House Democrats in voting against the American Recovery and Reinvestment Act of 2009, an $819 billion economic stimulus bill proposed by President Barack Obama. Shuler also voted against the Affordable Health Care for America Act, or HR 3962, along with 38 other Democrats, despite voting yes on the Stupak amendment in the same bill, which prohibits federal funds to be used for abortions. In January 2011, Shuler voted against repealing the law, explaining that the repeal would be immoral.

Cap and trade

Shuler voted in favor of HR 2454, the American Clean Energy and Security Act which would implement a cap and trade system aimed at controlling pollution.

Abortion

In 2011, he co-sponsored HR 3, the No Taxpayer Funding for Abortion Act, The bill contained an exception for "forcible rape", which opponents criticized as potentially excluding drug-facilitated rape, date rape, and other forms of rape. The bill also allowed an exception for minors who are victims of incest.

Guns

Shuler is a strong advocate of gun rights. On January 10, 2011, the Washington Post reported that "[i]n the wake of the shooting of Rep. Gabrielle Giffords," Shuler "intends to arm himself more frequently" and is "encouraging his staff members to apply for carry permits". On January 29, 2011, a Doonesbury cartoon made fun of Shuler's plan to carry a gun.

LGBT issues

In April 2009, Shuler voted against the Matthew Shepard and James Byrd Jr. Hate Crimes Prevention Act.

Republican 2011 budget

In July 2011, Shuler was one of five Democrats to vote for the Cut, Cap, and Balance Act.

Interest in leadership position

During his 2010 campaign, Shuler showed interest in taking the place of Nancy Pelosi as Speaker of the House, if Democrats maintained their majority. On November 4, after Republicans had won a majority of seats in the upcoming Congress, Shuler predicted Pelosi would no longer be a leader in the House. However, if Pelosi wanted to take the minority leader position, Shuler told Roll Call, he would run against her if there were no "viable candidate".

On November 13, 2010, in a long New York Times article about Shuler, Campbell Robertson noted his use of a football analogy to describe the current situation of Congressional Democrats: "It's no different than me as a quarterback," he said. "I didn't play very good. So what they'd do? They benched me." Robertson noted that "Shuler has emerged as one of most prominent voices in the debate on the Democratic Party's immediate future. He was among the first to call for Ms. Pelosi to step down from her leadership role in the new Congress and said he would run for minority leader himself if no alternative emerged (though he admitted that he would be an underdog)." According to Robertson, Shuler felt the Democratic leadership "has been too reflexively partisan" and called for "a more moderate approach".

Robertson observed that North Carolina "has long nurtured a strand of progressivism, particularly on issues like education, and a Sunday school brand of social conservatism — sometimes in the same candidate," and that "North Carolina's curious politics are on full display in Mr. Shuler's district, which ... includes the heavily Democratic city of Asheville, home to yoga studios and holistic medicine centers, as well as staunchly conservative hamlets scattered throughout the Blue Ridge Mountains."

As expected, Pelosi did run for minority leader, and on November 14, Shuler told CNN he would run against her, though he doubted he would win. Shuler lost to Pelosi 150–43 on November 17, but he was pleased that conservative Democrats showed they must be dealt with. On the opening day of the 112th Congress, Shuler received 11 votes for Speaker of the House, which his political aide called "the most dissenting votes recorded in modern history for partisan defections during a vote for Speaker".

The result of the votes were:

| Candidate | Votes | Percent |
|---|---|---|
| **Nancy Pelosi** | **150** | **77.72%** |
| Heath Shuler | 43 | 22.28% |

2011 Speaker of the United States House of Representatives election
| Party | Candidate | Votes | % |
|---|---|---|---|
| **Republican** | **John Boehner (OH 8)** | **241** | **55.88** |
| Democratic | Nancy Pelosi (CA 8) (incumbent) | 173 | 39.96 |
| Democratic | Heath Shuler (NC 11) | 11 | 2.53 |
| Democratic | John Lewis (GA 5) | 2 | 0.48 |
| Democratic | Dennis Cardoza (CA 18) | 1 | 0.23 |
| Democratic | Jim Costa (CA 20) | 1 | 0.23 |
| Democratic | Jim Cooper (TN 5) | 1 | 0.23 |
| Democratic | Steny Hoyer (MD 5) | 1 | 0.23 |
| Democratic | Marcy Kaptur (OH 9) | 1 | 0.23 |
| Total votes | | **432** | **100** |
| Votes necessary | | 217 | >50 |

=== Committee assignments ===
- Committee on the Budget
- Committee on Transportation and Infrastructure
  - Subcommittee on Economic Development, Public Buildings and Emergency Management
  - Subcommittee on Highways and Transit

== Post-political career ==
Shuler transitioned to a lobbying position with Duke Energy to direct its lobbying and government affairs in Washington, D.C., in 2013. He later became an advisor for BakerHostetler, while also co-hosting a podcast for JD Supra.

In March 2020, he endorsed Joe Biden's presidential bid.

== Personal life ==
Shuler is married to Nikol Davis, with whom he has two children: a daughter, Island, and a son, Navy. Shuler remains active in the Fellowship of Christian Athletes. Shuler also serves as a volunteer assistant football coach for Christ School, a boarding and day school located in suburban Asheville. His son Navy attended Christ School, and Appalachian State University before transferring to the University of Tennessee as a quarterback.

In Washington, Shuler lived at the C Street House of The Fellowship, a controversial organization which operates the property as a tax-exempt church and a residence for several congressmen and senators. The building became notorious during a series of political sex scandals in 2009, in which current or former residents John Ensign, Mark Sanford, and Chip Pickering admitted to adulterous affairs, which their housemates knew of but did not publicize. In September 2010, The New Yorker published a piece about the house, focusing on the connection with a secretive religious organization called the Fellowship. Shuler has attended weekly prayer sessions sponsored by the group since his arrival in Washington. In reference to the secrecy, Shuler said "I've been here the whole time, and there's talk about what the Fellowship is, but I honestly have no idea what they're talking about. I honestly don't know what it is."

Shuler is a Freemason.

== Electoral history ==
2006 United States House of Representatives North Carolina 11th District election
| Party | Candidate | Votes | % | ±% |
|---|---|---|---|---|
| **Democratic** | **Heath Shuler** | **124,972** | **53.79** | **+8.70** |
| Republican | Charles H. Taylor (incumbent) | 107,342 | 46.21 | –8.70 |
| Total votes | | **232,314** | **100** | |
| Democratic **gain** from Republican | | | | |

2008 United States House of Representatives North Carolina 11th District election
| Party | Candidate | Votes | % | ±% |
|---|---|---|---|---|
| **Democratic** | **Heath Shuler (incumbent)** | **211,112** | **61.96** | **+8.17** |
| Republican | Carl Mumpower | 122,087 | 35.83 | –10.37 |
| Libertarian | Keith Smith | 7,517 | 2.21 | N/A |
| Total votes | | **340,716** | **100** | |
| Democratic **hold** | | | | |

North Carolina's 11th district general election, November 2, 2010
| Party | Candidate | Votes | % |
|---|---|---|---|
| **Democratic** | **Heath Shuler (incumbent)** | **131,225** | **54.34** |
| Republican | Jeff Miller | 110,246 | 45.66 |
| Total votes | | **241,741** | **100.00** |
| Democratic **hold** | | | |

== See also ==
- North Carolina Democratic Party

U.S. House of Representatives
| Preceded by Charles Taylor | Member of the U.S. House of Representatives from North Carolina's 11th congressional district 2007–2013 | Succeeded by Mark Meadows |
Party political offices
| Preceded by Stephanie Herseth Sandlin | Chair of the Blue Dog Coalition for Administration; 2011–2013; Served alongside: Mike Ross (Communications), John Barrow (Policy) | Succeeded by John Barrow |
U.S. order of precedence (ceremonial)
| Preceded by Chris Collins as Former U.S. Representative | Order of precedence of the United States as Former U.S. Representative | Succeeded by Renee Ellmers as Former U.S. Representative |
