= Charles Taylor (North Carolina politician) =

American politician (born 1941)

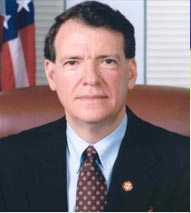

Member of the U.S. House of Representatives from North Carolina's 11th district
- In office January 3, 1991 – January 3, 2007
- Preceded by: James Clarke
- Succeeded by: Heath Shuler

Member of the North Carolina Senate from the 27th district
- In office January 1973 – January 1975 Serving with Elizabeth Wilkie
- Preceded by: Phil Baugh; Eddie Knox; Herman Moore
- Succeeded by: Cecil Hill; Joe Palmer

Member of the North Carolina House of Representatives from the 48th district
- In office January 1967 – January 1973
- Preceded by: Constituency established
- Succeeded by: Constituency abolished

Personal details
- Born: Charles Hart Taylor; January 23, 1941 (age 85) Brevard, North Carolina, U.S.
- Party: Republican
- Spouse: Elizabeth Taylor
- Education: Wake Forest University (BA, JD)

Charles Hart Taylor (born January 23, 1941) is an American politician and businessman who served as a member of the United States House of Representatives, representing North Carolina's 11th congressional district from 1991 to 2007.

== Early life and education ==
Taylor was born in Brevard, North Carolina. He attended Wake Forest University, where he received his BA in 1963 and his Juris Doctor from Wake Forest University School of Law in 1966.

== Political career ==
Taylor served in the North Carolina General Assembly as a Republican from Transylvania County from 1967 to 1975 — serving in the State House from 1967 to 1973 and the State Senate from 1973 to 1975. He then returned to his business interests until entering Congress.

=== Congress ===
In 1988, Taylor ran against Democratic incumbent Jamie Clarke and lost by just over 1,500 votes. He sought a rematch against Clarke in 1990 and won by 2,700 votes. He was reelected with 54 percent of the vote in 1992, even as Bill Clinton carried the district. He was reelected six more times from the 11th, which includes most of North Carolina's share of the Blue Ridge Mountains.

In his first term, as a member of the Gang of Seven, a group of first-term Republican Representatives, Taylor worked to expose the 1992 House banking scandal.

In 2006, Taylor's Democratic opponent was Heath Shuler, a native of Swain County and a former quarterback for the University of Tennessee and the Washington Redskins.

Shuler defeated Taylor, earning 54 percent of the vote to Taylor's 46 percent. In December 2007, Taylor announced that he would not seek a rematch with Shuler in 2008.

== Positions ==
Taylor was one of the most conservative members of the House. He had a lifetime rating of 92 from the American Conservative Union. He was a member of the Republican Study Committee, a caucus of conservative Republican congressmen.

=== Environment ===
Taylor was the Chairman of the Subcommittee on Interior, Environment, and Related Agencies, on the U.S. House Committee on Appropriations.

Taylor served on the advisory board of the National Wilderness Institute, a "deceptively named" pro-timber group which worked to promote timber companies' private property rights and reduce environmental safeguards.

=== Spending ===
In 2005 and 2006, Taylor made national headlines for delaying full funding by the federal government for a $60 million memorial to United Flight 93, which crashed in Pennsylvania on September 11, 2001. Taylor's preference was for federal funding to be lowered and supplemented by private donations. After pressure from a variety of people, including President George W. Bush, Taylor ended his opposition and allowed funding for the memorial; he had used his Appropriations subcommittee chairmanship to block the funding. At the time of his protest, private donors had only donated $7 million towards the cost, and Taylor feared that the government would be forced to come up with the other $53 million.

Taylor supported spending over $600 million for a road through the Great Smoky Mountains National Park to settle a 1943 agreement with the federal government. Proponents of the road argue that if it were built, it would provide better access to ancestral cemeteries inside the park, as well as providing a tourist draw to the region. Critics call the project the "Road to Nowhere", and argue that if the road were built, it would cut through the largest roadless tract east of the Mississippi River; and prefer, instead, a cash settlement with the federal government.

=== Free trade ===
Taylor had been outspoken in his opposition to the Central American Free Trade Agreement (CAFTA) and other trade agreements that he argues would hurt his district, which has suffered from the closing of textile, furniture, and other plants when production has been moved abroad where labor costs are cheaper. However, he failed to register a vote during final approval of the agreement by the House, which passed 217–215. According to GOP aides, Taylor cast a no vote with a deactivated voting card. The glitch registered with the House Clerk's office, but Taylor had left the House floor and aides said attempts to locate him during the 62-minute vote were unsuccessful.

=== Russian student exchange program ===
Taylor started exchange programs for Russian students and internships for aspiring bankers and entrepreneurs in 1994, at colleges in his district.

In 2005, Taylor secured $100,000 in federal money for the International Trade and Small Business Institute, which brings foreign students to the U.S. to study at seven colleges and universities in western North Carolina. The 2007 federal budget contains a $1-million earmark for the program. In August 2006, 20 students arrived in the U.S. to attend six colleges and universities in western North Carolina.

The Russia-based coordinator of the study program is Marina Bolshakova. She and her husband are partners in the Russian bank owned by Taylor, and Taylor's Russian investment company. Taylor said Bolshakova earns no salary for her work, calling her a natural choice for the job because of her prior job as an English teacher.

Taylor made 11 trips to Russia between 1997 and 2005 as part of his Congressional travel, paid for by the U.S. government.

=== Iraq ===
In July 2005, at a town hall meeting in his district, when asked about the Iraq War, Taylor mentioned the terrorist bombings in London that occurred the prior week and said "Just like any murderer, they have to be dealt with and justice has to be brought." American troops, Taylor said, were doing a "job that should be done" in Iraq.

When asked for a time line of when he thought American troops might pull out, Taylor estimated that a reduction in American forces should occur in 2006. But he said American troops could spend another two years in Iraq training the country's new army.

Taylor was one of a handful of Congressmen who have had children serve in Iraq. His son Bryan is a US Army Captain who served in Iraq from mid-2004 until late 2005.

== Businesses ==
According to Roll Call, a Capitol Hill newspaper, Taylor was worth more than $55 million as of the end of 2005, making him one of the wealthiest members of Congress. Taylor founded and remains majority owner/chairman of the board of Blue Ridge Savings Bank in Asheville, NC. In 2006, he reported owning stock in Financial Guaranty Corporation, the holding company for the bank, that was worth more than $50 million. The holding company also owns a Russian bank (see below).

In September 2006, Citizens for Responsibility and Ethics in Washington named Taylor one of the "20 most corrupt members of Congress", saying his ethics issues arose "from his lucrative outside business interests". Shuler also accused Taylor of using his House seat to enrich himself, claiming that every earmark he placed in a transportation bill was for a project owned either by Taylor or one of his companies. Despite various accusations from political opponents, there were never any charges brought by the House Ethics committee against Taylor.

=== Blue Ridge Savings Bank ===
In January 2005, Hayes Martin, who had been bank president as well as Taylor's campaign treasurer, and Charles "Chig" Cagle, a former district Republican chairman who had taken out fraudulent loans from the bank, were sentenced for conspiracy to commit bank fraud and conspiracy to commit money laundering. Martin pleaded guilty in 2001. During the 2003 trial of attorney Thomas Jones, who handled the closing of the loans, Martin said that Taylor had first-hand knowledge of the loans. Cagle and Jones also said Taylor knew of the fraud.

Taylor has refused to comment on the case. Congressional staff routinely said the fraud was bank business and referred questions to Blue Ridge President Dwayne Wiseman. Following the sentencing, Taylor press secretary Deborah Potter said Taylor still had no comment, and reviewed a statement by Wiseman: "For a number of years there has been an effort on the part of certain political opponents of Congressman Charles Taylor to slander him and Blue Ridge Savings Bank by indicating that neither he nor the bank or any present officers of the bank had any prior knowledge," Wiseman said in the statement. "This went on for some nine years with the encouragement of the press. We would hope that the settlement of this case would put an end to such speculation." Taylor was never targeted by authorities as having any involvement in helping Martin defraud Blue Ridge Savings Bank, which Taylor owned.

=== Russian investments ===
Starting in the mid-1990s, Charles Taylor began financing small businesses in and around Ivanovo, an industrial city of almost 500,000, about 150 miles (240 km) northeast of Moscow. In 2003, Taylor purchased the Commercial Bank of Ivanovo with a Russian partner, Boris Bolshakov, a former KGB colonel and Supreme Soviet deputy, and Bolshakov's wife Marina. Taylor owns 80 percent of the bank as well as Columbus, a Russian investment company.

In December 2005, the Bank of Ivanovo opened a new four-story headquarters, its second office, in the city's downtown. Taylor said at the time that he didn't consider the bank to yet be particularly profitable. In mid-2006, Bolshakov said the bank's hard currency balance was more than $22 million and its loan portfolio was more than $18.6 million.

One of the 2005 participants in the Russian student exchange program told Associated Press that she had a summer work-study internship at the Bank of Ivanovo after she returned to Russia. Taylor's office said that was a mistake because Institute policy forbids participants to work in "any business venture with which Congressman Taylor is associated." The bank has since ended its participation in the work-study program, Taylor's office said.

Bank of Ivanovo had its license revoked on April 5, 2019, by the Central Bank of Russia for regularly breaking anti-money laundering regulations, misrepresenting the size of its provisions and using "schemes" to artificially inflate its capital, according to a central bank statement.

=== Cattle and tree farms ===
In 2000, Jackson County's tax collector asked the U.S. House of Representatives to garnish his wages to collect more than $3,583 in back taxes resulting from a dispute over parcels owned by Transylvania Tree Farms, a Taylor business. The county said that Taylor had failed to file a management plan for his property, despite repeated requests from the county, and so it could not be assessed at a lower rate through a forest land tax deferment. Taylor's attorney disputed the authority of the county to require such a plan.

In May 2006, Champion Cattle and Tree Farm, located in Transylvania County, was issued a notice of violation because rental property of the company had become a "public health nuisance."

Taylor owned 8,000 acres (32 km^{2}) on the North Carolina side of Sassafras Mountain, the highest point in South Carolina. In June 2010 it was announced he planned to sell the property to the Carolina Mountain Land Conservancy for $33 million. It had a market value of $63 million and the difference was considered a charitable gift for tax purposes. Most of the property was used to create Headwaters State Forest.

== Affiliations ==
- Congressional Coalition on Adoption
- North Carolina Board of Transportation
- North Carolina Energy Policy Council
- Board of Visitors, United States Military Academy, West Point
- Vice Chair, Western North Carolina Environmental Council.
- Member and Past International Justice of Phi Alpha Delta Law Fraternity

North Carolina House of Representatives
Preceded by Constituency established	Member of the North Carolina House of Representatives from the 48th district 1967–1973	Succeeded by Constituency abolished
North Carolina Senate
Preceded by Phil Baugh; Eddie Knox; Herman Moore	Member of the North Carolina Senate from the 27th district 1973–1975; Served alongside: Elizabeth Wilkie	Succeeded by Cecil Hill; Joe Palmer
U.S. House of Representatives
Preceded by James M. Clarke	Member of the U.S. House of Representatives from North Carolina's 11th congressional district 1991–2007	Succeeded by Heath Shuler
U.S. order of precedence (ceremonial)
Preceded by Steve Israel as Former U.S. Representative	Order of precedence of the United States as Former U.S. Representative	Succeeded by Patrick J. Kennedy as Former U.S. Representative
