= Jamie Ager =

American farmer and politician (born 1977)

- Ager in 2026

Member-elect of the U.S. House of Representatives from North Carolina's 11th district
- Assuming office January 3, 2027
- Succeeding: Chuck Edwards

Personal details
- Born: November 18, 1977 (age 49) Fairview, North Carolina, U.S.
- Party: Democratic
- Spouse: Amy Ager
- Children: 3
- Parent: John Ager (father)
- Relatives: Eric Ager (brother); James McClure Clarke (grandfather)
- Education: Warren Wilson College (BA)
- Website: Campaign Website

Jamie Petersen Ager (born November 18, 1977) is an American farmer, businessman, and politician who is the U.S. representative-elect for North Carolina's 11th congressional district. A member of the Democratic Party, Ager is the co-founder and chief executive of Hickory Nut Gap, a regenerative farm and locally sourced meat distributor based on his family's farm in Fairview, North Carolina.

== Early life and education ==
Ager grew up on Hickory Nut Gap Farm in Fairview, North Carolina, in Buncombe County. The farm was established in 1916 by Jim and Elizabeth McClure, founders of the Farmers Federation agricultural cooperative, and passed through the Clarke family to the Agers. His grandfather, James McClure Clarke, represented North Carolina's 11th congressional district from 1983 to 1985 and from 1987 to 1991. His father, John Ager, represented the 115th district in the North Carolina House of Representatives from 2015 to 2023, and his brother, Eric Ager, has represented the 114th district since 2023.

Ager graduated from A.C. Reynolds High School in Asheville and earned degrees in environmental studies and history from Warren Wilson College in Swannanoa, with a focus on sustainable agriculture.

== Farming and business career ==
After college, Ager visited the farmer and author Joel Salatin to study pasture-based livestock production. Ager and his wife, Amy, married in 2001 and founded Hickory Nut Gap Meats, a business that direct-markets grass-fed beef and pastured poultry, sourcing meat from its own farm as well as from other local producers. The company began with a single restaurant customer in Asheville and later expanded to source from a network of partner farms across the region. As of 2025, the company employed about 25 people.

Hickory Nut Gap Farm was badly damaged by Hurricane Helene in September 2024, which struck during the farm's harvest season, when it typically earns more than half of its annual revenue. Afterward, Ager hosted community cookouts for neighbors affected by the storm, and the farm store reopened by mid-October 2024. In March 2025, the company lost its contract to supply beef to Buncombe County schools after the United States Department of Agriculture ended the pandemic-era Local Food for Schools program, which had funded purchases from local farms.

== 2026 congressional campaign ==
Ager announced his candidacy for North Carolina's 11th congressional district on July 31, 2025, his first run for elected office. In the March 3, 2026, Democratic primary, he won 64.7 percent of the vote against four opponents. The Democratic Congressional Campaign Committee added him to its "Red to Blue" program for competitive Republican-held seats.

Ager describes himself as a "Mountain Democrat." He has said he does not accept corporate political action committee money, and he signed the centrist "Promise to America" pledge, which drew criticism from some on the party's left. His campaign has emphasized Hurricane Helene recovery funding, cost of living, health care, immigration reform, and anti-corruption measures. On energy and the environment, he has said he supports the cheapest available energy sources including solar, and opposes cuts to the National Oceanic and Atmospheric Administration. He has said he supports a short-term moratorium on new data center construction in Western North Carolina. He was endorsed by the Blue Dog PAC. Between July 2025 and February 2026, Ager raised more than $940,000, outpacing incumbent Republican Chuck Edwards.

Ager was originally set to face Edwards in the general election. In August 2026, Edwards withdrew from the race after the House Ethics Committee recommended he be censured over allegations of inappropriate conduct toward two female aides. On August 10, 2026, the district's Republican executive committee selected state representative Jennifer Balkcom as the replacement nominee. Sabato's Crystal Ball moved the race to "Toss-up" in late July 2026, while the Cook Political Report rated it "Lean Republican" as of September 2026.

Ager won the general election on November 3rd, 2026 57% to 41%. Ager was one of at least six North Carolinian Democratic house candidates to win a district that voted for Donald Trump by 10 or more points in 2024, in what commentators deemed a dummymander of North Carolina's 2023 gerrymander.

=== Electoral history ===
2026 Democratic primary, North Carolina's 11th congressional district
Party	Candidate	Votes	%
Democratic	Jamie Ager	49,077	64.7
Democratic	Richard Hudspeth	12,027	15.9
Democratic	Zelda Briarwood	9,852	13.0
Democratic	Paul Maddox	3,842	5.1
Democratic	Lee Whipple	1,071	1.4
Total votes		75,869	100.0

== Personal life ==
Ager lives in Fairview with his wife, Amy, with whom he has three sons. The couple hosts monthly barn dances at their farm.

U.S. House of Representatives
Preceded by Chuck Edwards	Member of the U.S. House of Representatives from North Carolina's 11th congressional district Taking office 2027	Elect
