= North Carolina's 116th House district =

American legislative district

North Carolina's 116th State House of Representatives district
Representative
Brian Turner; D–Asheville
- Demographics: 78% White; 8% Black; 8% Hispanic; 1% Asian; 1% Other; 4% Multiracial
- Population (2024): 88,236

North Carolina's 116th House district is one of 120 districts in the North Carolina House of Representatives. It has been represented by Democrat Brian Turner since 2025.

== Geography ==
Since 2003, the district has included part of Buncombe County. The district overlaps with the 49th Senate district.

== District officeholders since 2003 ==
Representative	Party	Dates	Notes	Counties
District created January 1, 2003.				2003–Present; Part of Buncombe County.
Wilma Sherrill (Asheville)	Republican	January 1, 2003 – January 1, 2007	Redistricted from the 51st district Retired.	2003–Present; Part of Buncombe County.
Charles Thomas (Asheville)	Republican	January 1, 2007 – January 1, 2009	Retired.	2003–Present; Part of Buncombe County.
Jane Whilden (Asheville)	Democratic	January 1, 2009 – January 1, 2011	Lost re-election.	2003–Present; Part of Buncombe County.
Tim Moffitt (Asheville)	Republican	January 1, 2011 – January 1, 2015	Lost re-election.	2003–Present; Part of Buncombe County.
Brian Turner (Asheville)	Democratic	January 1, 2015 – January 1, 2023	Redistricted to the 115th district and retired.	2003–Present; Part of Buncombe County.
Caleb Rudow (Asheville)	Democratic	January 1, 2023 – January 1, 2025	Redistricted from the 114th district. Retired to run for Congress.	2003–Present; Part of Buncombe County.
Brian Turner (Asheville)	Democratic	January 1, 2025 – Present		2003–Present; Part of Buncombe County.

== Election results ==
=== 2024 ===
North Carolina House of Representatives 116th district general election, 2024
Party	Candidate	Votes	%
Democratic	Brian Turner	42,815	100%
Total votes		42,815	100%
Democratic hold			

=== 2022 ===
North Carolina House of Representatives 116th district general election, 2022
Party	Candidate	Votes	%
Democratic	Caleb Rudow (incumbent)	25,161	62.36%
Republican	Mollie Rose	15,185	37.64%
Total votes		40,346	100%
Democratic hold			

=== 2020 ===
North Carolina House of Representatives 116th district general election, 2020
Party	Candidate	Votes	%
Democratic	Brian Turner (incumbent)	33,024	61.90%
Republican	Eric Burns	20,324	38.10%
Total votes		55,348	100%
Democratic hold			

=== 2018 ===
North Carolina House of Representatives 116th district general election, 2018
Party	Candidate	Votes	%
Democratic	Brian Turner (incumbent)	19,571	54.88%
Republican	Marilyn A. Brown	16,091	45.12%
Total votes		35,662	100%
Democratic hold			

=== 2016 ===
North Carolina House of Representatives 116th district general election, 2016
Party	Candidate	Votes	%
Democratic	Brian Turner (incumbent)	28,014	100%
Total votes		28,014	100%
Democratic hold			

=== 2014 ===
North Carolina House of Representatives 116th district general election, 2014
Party	Candidate	Votes	%
Democratic	Brian Turner	13,298	51.91%
Republican	Tim Moffitt (incumbent)	12,321	48.09%
Total votes		25,619	100%
Democratic gain from Republican			

=== 2012 ===
North Carolina House of Representatives 116th district general election, 2012
Party	Candidate	Votes	%
Republican	Tim Moffitt (incumbent)	21,291	56.31%
Democratic	Jane Whilden	16,519	43.69%
Total votes		37,810	100%
Republican hold			

=== 2010 ===
North Carolina House of Representatives 116th district general election, 2010
Party	Candidate	Votes	%
Republican	Tim Moffitt	14,638	55.79%
Democratic	Jane Whilden (incumbent)	11,598	44.21%
Total votes		26,236	100%
Republican gain from Democratic			

=== 2008 ===
North Carolina House of Representatives 116th district general election, 2008
Party	Candidate	Votes	%
Democratic	Jane Whilden	20,019	51.70%
Republican	Tim Moffitt	18,704	48.30%
Total votes		38,723	100%
Democratic gain from Republican			

=== 2006 ===
North Carolina House of Representatives 116th district Democratic primary election, 2006
Party	Candidate	Votes	%
Democratic	Doug Jones	1,629	52.04%
Democratic	Jim F. Hughes	934	29.84%
Democratic	James Latimore	390	12.46%
Democratic	Gregory L. Cathcart	177	5.65%
Total votes		3,130	100%

North Carolina House of Representatives 116th district Republican primary election, 2006
Party	Candidate	Votes	%
Republican	Charles Thomas	881	58.27%
Republican	Bill Porter	631	41.73%
Total votes		1,512	100%

North Carolina House of Representatives 116th district general election, 2006
Party	Candidate	Votes	%
Republican	Charles Thomas	12,840	50.83%
Democratic	Doug Jones	12,420	49.17%
Total votes		25,260	100%
Republican hold			

=== 2004 ===
North Carolina House of Representatives 116th district general election, 2004
Party	Candidate	Votes	%
Republican	Wilma Sherrill (incumbent)	20,030	62.25%
Democratic	Doug Jones	12,149	37.75%
Total votes		32,179	100%
Republican hold			

=== 2002 ===
North Carolina House of Representatives 116th district Republican primary election, 2002
Party	Candidate	Votes	%
Republican	Wilma Sherrill (incumbent)	1,959	66.41%
Republican	Mike Morgan	991	33.59%
Total votes		2,950	100%

North Carolina House of Representatives 116th district general election, 2002
Party	Candidate	Votes	%
Republican	Wilma Sherrill (incumbent)	13,470	100%
Total votes		13,470	100%
Republican hold			
