= Cooper Ingle =

American baseball player (born 2002)

Cleveland Guardians – No. 30
- Catcher / Outfielder
- Born: February 23, 2002 (age 24); Asheville, North Carolina, U.S.
- Bats: Left Throws: Right

MLB debut
- June 26, 2026, for the Cleveland Guardians

MLB statistics (through 2026 season)
- Batting average: .095
- Home runs: 0
- Runs batted in: 2
- Stats at Baseball Reference

Teams
- Cleveland Guardians (2026–present)

John Cooper Ingle (born February 23, 2002) is an American professional baseball catcher and outfielder for the Cleveland Guardians of Major League Baseball (MLB).

== Amateur career ==
Ingle attended A. C. Reynolds High School in Asheville, North Carolina and played college baseball at Clemson University. In 2022, he played collegiate summer baseball with the Chatham Anglers of the Cape Cod Baseball League.

== Professional career ==
After three years at Clemson, Ingle was selected by the Cleveland Guardians in the fourth round of the 2023 Major League Baseball draft. Ingle made his professional debut with the Lake County Captains. He started 2024 with Lake County before being promoted to the Akron RubberDucks.

Ingle split the 2025 campaign between Akron and the Triple–A Columbus Clippers, batting a combined .260/.389/.419 with 10 home runs and 55 RBI. He was assigned to Triple–A Columbus to begin the 2026 season.

On June 26, 2026, Ingle was promoted to the major leagues for the first time.
