= Eric Ager =

American politician from North Carolina

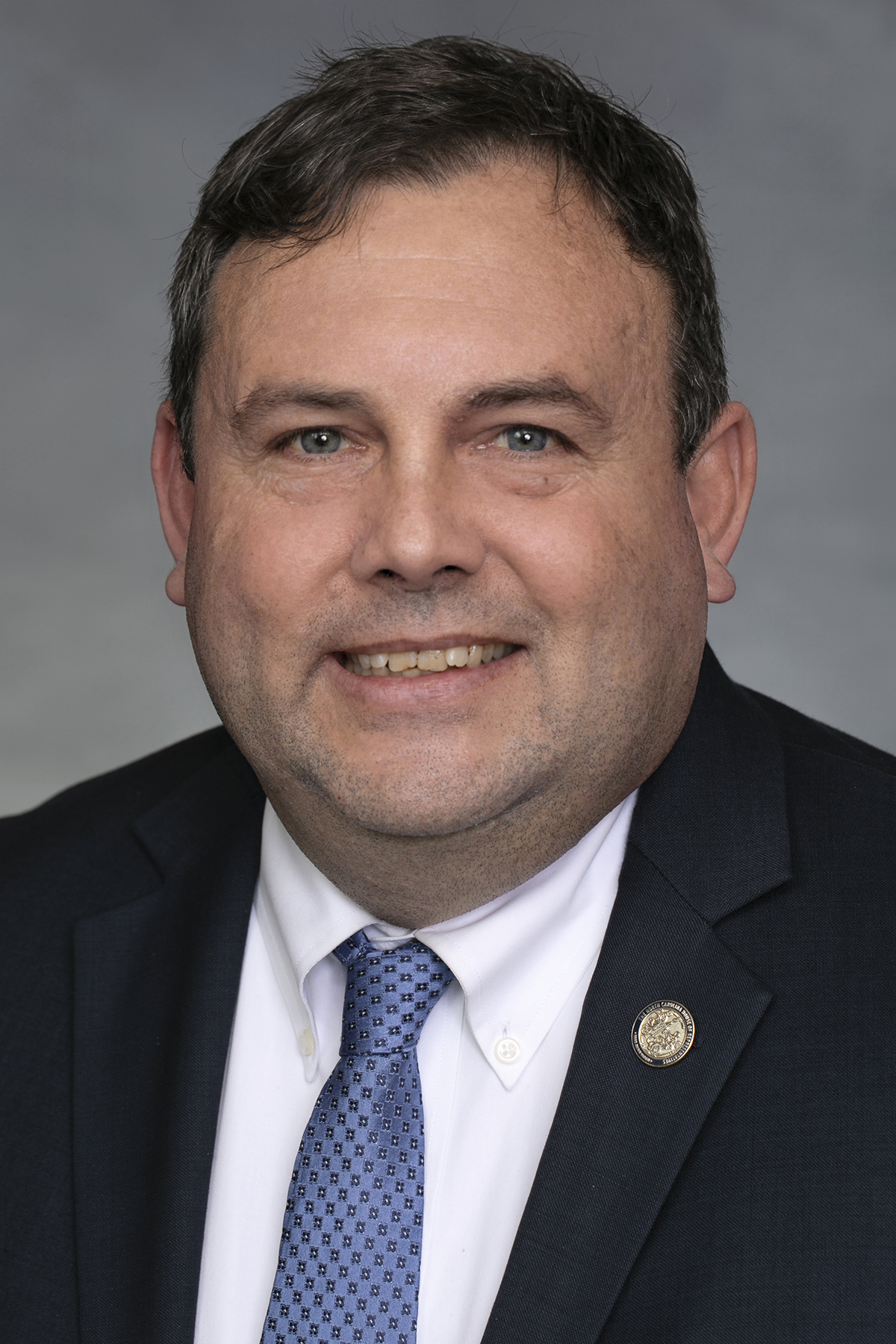
- Official portrait, 2023

Member of the North Carolina House of Representatives from the 114th district
- Incumbent
- Assumed office January 1, 2023
- Preceded by: John Ager (redistricted)

Personal details
- Born: 1973 or 1974 (age 52–53)
- Party: Democratic
- Relatives: Jamie Ager (brother); John Ager (father); Jamie Clarke (grandfather)
- Education: United States Naval Academy (BS); Atılım University (MA)

Military service
- Branch/service: United States Navy
- Rank: Commander

J. Eric Ager (born 1973 or 1974) is an American politician who has served as a Democratic member of the North Carolina House of Representatives from the 114th district since 2023. His brother, Jamie Ager, was elected to the US House of Representatives in North Carolina's 11th Congressional district in the 2026 United States elections. His father, John Ager, previously served in the North Carolina House of Representatives from 2015 to 2023, representing the 115th district.

== Electoral history ==
=== 2024 ===
North Carolina House of Representatives 114th district general election, 2024
Party	Candidate	Votes	%
Democratic	Eric Ager (incumbent)	32,441	59.69%
Republican	Sherry Higgins	21,905	40.31%
Total votes		54,346	100%
Democratic hold			

=== 2022 ===
North Carolina House of Representatives 114th district general election, 2022
Party	Candidate	Votes	%
Democratic	Eric Ager	28,999	68.76%
Republican	Everett D. Pittillo	13,177	31.24%
Total votes		42,176	100%
Democratic hold			
