= North Carolina's 114th House district =

American legislative district

North Carolina's 114th State House of Representatives district
Representative
Eric Ager; D–Fairview, Buncombe County
- Demographics: 83% White; 4% Black; 7% Hispanic; 1% Asian; 1% Other; 4% Multiracial
- Population (2024): 87,063

North Carolina's 114th House district is one of 120 districts in the North Carolina House of Representatives. It has been represented by Democrat Eric Ager since 2023.

== Geography ==
Since 2003, the district has included part of Buncombe County. The district overlaps with the 46th and 49th Senate districts.

== District officeholders since 2003 ==
Representative	Party	Dates	Notes	Counties
District created January 1, 2003.				2003–Present; Part of Buncombe County.
Martin Nesbitt (Asheville)	Democratic	January 1, 2003 – February 6, 2004	Redistricted from the 51st district. Resigned to assume seat in the State Senate.	2003–Present; Part of Buncombe County.
Susan Fisher (Asheville)	Democratic	February 6, 2004 – January 31, 2022	Appointed to finish Nesbitt's term. Resigned.	2003–Present; Part of Buncombe County.
Vacant		January 31, 2022 – February 1, 2022		2003–Present; Part of Buncombe County.
Caleb Rudow (Asheville)	Democratic	February 1, 2022 – January 1, 2023	Appointed to finish Fisher's term. Redistricted to the 116th district.	2003–Present; Part of Buncombe County.
Eric Ager (Fairview)	Democratic	January 1, 2023 – Present		2003–Present; Part of Buncombe County.

== Election results ==
=== 2024 ===
North Carolina House of Representatives 114th district general election, 2024
Party	Candidate	Votes	%
Democratic	Eric Ager (incumbent)	32,441	59.69%
Republican	Sherry Higgins	21,905	40.31%
Total votes		54,346	100%
Democratic hold			

=== 2022 ===
North Carolina House of Representatives 114th district general election, 2022
Party	Candidate	Votes	%
Democratic	Eric Ager	28,999	68.76%
Republican	Everett D. Pittillo	13,177	31.24%
Total votes		42,176	100%
Democratic hold			

=== 2020 ===
North Carolina House of Representatives 114th district general election, 2020
Party	Candidate	Votes	%
Democratic	Susan Fisher (incumbent)	30,584	58.24%
Republican	Tim Hyatt	20,132	38.34%
Libertarian	Lyndon John Smith	1,794	3.42%
Total votes		62,510	100%
Democratic hold			

=== 2018 ===
North Carolina House of Representatives 114th district general election, 2018
Party	Candidate	Votes	%
Democratic	Susan Fisher (incumbent)	34,542	82.27%
Republican	Kris A. Lindstam	7,444	17.73%
Total votes		41,986	100%
Democratic hold			

=== 2016 ===
North Carolina House of Representatives 114th district general election, 2016
Party	Candidate	Votes	%
Democratic	Susan Fisher (incumbent)	39,243	100%
Total votes		39,243	100%
Democratic hold			

=== 2014 ===
North Carolina House of Representatives 114th district general election, 2014
Party	Candidate	Votes	%
Democratic	Susan Fisher (incumbent)	24,402	100%
Total votes		24,402	100%
Democratic hold			

=== 2012 ===
North Carolina House of Representatives 114th district general election, 2012
Party	Candidate	Votes	%
Democratic	Susan Fisher (incumbent)	34,719	100%
Total votes		34,719	100%
Democratic hold			

=== 2010 ===
North Carolina House of Representatives 114th district general election, 2010
Party	Candidate	Votes	%
Democratic	Susan Fisher (incumbent)	14,555	58.43%
Republican	John Carroll	10,356	41.57%
Total votes		24,911	100%
Democratic hold			

=== 2008 ===
North Carolina House of Representatives 114th district general election, 2008
Party	Candidate	Votes	%
Democratic	Susan Fisher (incumbent)	28,286	100%
Total votes		28,286	100%
Democratic hold			

=== 2006 ===
North Carolina House of Representatives 114th district general election, 2006
Party	Candidate	Votes	%
Democratic	Susan Fisher (incumbent)	16,073	64.28%
Republican	Mike Harrison	8,933	35.72%
Total votes		25,006	100%
Democratic hold			

=== 2004 ===
North Carolina House of Representatives 114th district general election, 2004
Party	Candidate	Votes	%
Democratic	Susan Fisher (incumbent)	19,098	61.95%
Republican	Bill Porter	11,729	38.05%
Total votes		30,827	100%
Democratic hold			

=== 2002 ===
North Carolina House of Representatives 114th district general election, 2002
Party	Candidate	Votes	%
Democratic	Martin Nesbitt (incumbent)	12,516	60.95%
Republican	Bill Porter	7,097	34.56%
Libertarian	Clarence Young	921	4.49%
Total votes		20,534	100%
Democratic hold			
