= Bill Hendon =

American politician

William Martin Hendon
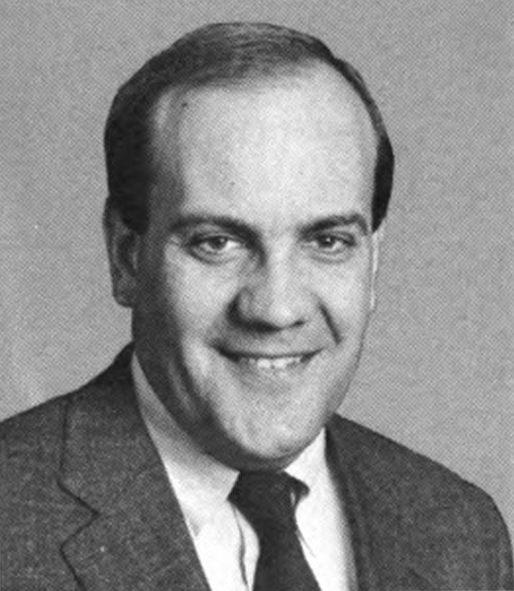
- Bill Hendon circa 1985

Member of the U.S. House of Representatives from North Carolina's 11th district
- In office January 3, 1981 – January 3, 1983
- Preceded by: V. Lamar Gudger
- Succeeded by: James McClure Clarke
- In office January 3, 1985 – January 3, 1987
- Preceded by: James McClure Clarke
- Succeeded by: James McClure Clarke

Personal details
- Born: November 9, 1944 Asheville, North Carolina, U.S.
- Died: June 20, 2018 (aged 73) Forest City, North Carolina, U.S.
- Party: Republican
- Education: University of Tennessee, Knoxville

William Martin Hendon (November 9, 1944 – June 20, 2018) was an American author, POW/MIA activist, and two-term Republican U.S. Congressman from North Carolina's 11th District.

== Political career ==
In 1980, Hendon ousted two-term incumbent Democrat V. Lamar Gudger to become the first Republican to represent what is now the 11th since 1929. For the rest of the decade, Hendon's rivalry with Democrat Jamie Clarke gained national attention. In 1982, Clarke defeated Hendon's bid for re-election by less than 1,500 votes. In 1984 Hendon gained revenge by defeating Clarke's bid for re-election by just two percentage points—likely helped by Ronald Reagan's landslide victory. In their third consecutive meeting in 1986 Hendon lost to Clarke by one percentage point. Despite being encouraged to run against Clarke for a fourth time in 1988, Hendon declined.

== Post-political career ==
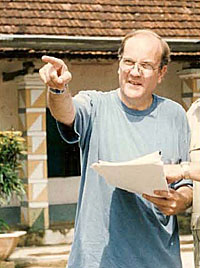
Hendon inspecting a Vietnam War-era prison, 30 miles (48 km) south of Hanoi, 1993.

His 2007 New York Times bestseller, An Enormous Crime, co-written with attorney Elizabeth Stewart, argues that American soldiers were abandoned in Indochina following the Vietnam War. In its review, Publishers Weekly stated, "controversial former North Carolina congressman Hendon and attorney Stewart make the case that the U.S. knowingly left hundreds of POWs in Vietnam and Laos in 1973, and that every presidential administration since then has covered it up." Kirkus Reviews called it "a sprawling indictment of eight U.S. Administrations.… A convincing, urgent argument."

One day prior to the release of An Enormous Crime, The Raleigh News & Observer ran a story about a passage in Douglas Brinkley's The Reagan Diaries, wherein President Ronald Reagan, following a briefing by then-Vice President George H. W. Bush, wrote that Hendon was "off his rocker" with allegations about Americans held in Vietnam. Bush's feelings aside, after Hendon was narrowly defeated (50.7% to 49.3%) in the 1986 mid-term elections, Reagan appointed him to the board of directors of the Tennessee Valley Authority. Hendon withdrew his name from consideration for the post in the face of stiff Senate Democratic opposition to his environmental record, and instead accepted a position with the pro-defense American Defense Institute. He would remain an active voice on the POW/MIA issue until his death in 2018.

Hendon died on June 20, 2018, under hospice care in Forest City, North Carolina after long illness at the age of 73.

== Tenure in the United States Congress ==
- 97th United States Congress (1981–1983)
- 99th United States Congress (1985–1987)

U.S. House of Representatives
Preceded by V. Lamar Gudger	Member of the U.S. House of Representatives from North Carolina's 11th congressional district 1981–1983	Succeeded by James McClure Clarke
Preceded by James McClure Clarke	Member of the U.S. House of Representatives from North Carolina's 11th congressional district 1985–1987	Succeeded by James McClure Clarke
