= Brian Turner (politician) =

American politician from North Carolina

Representative Brian Turner
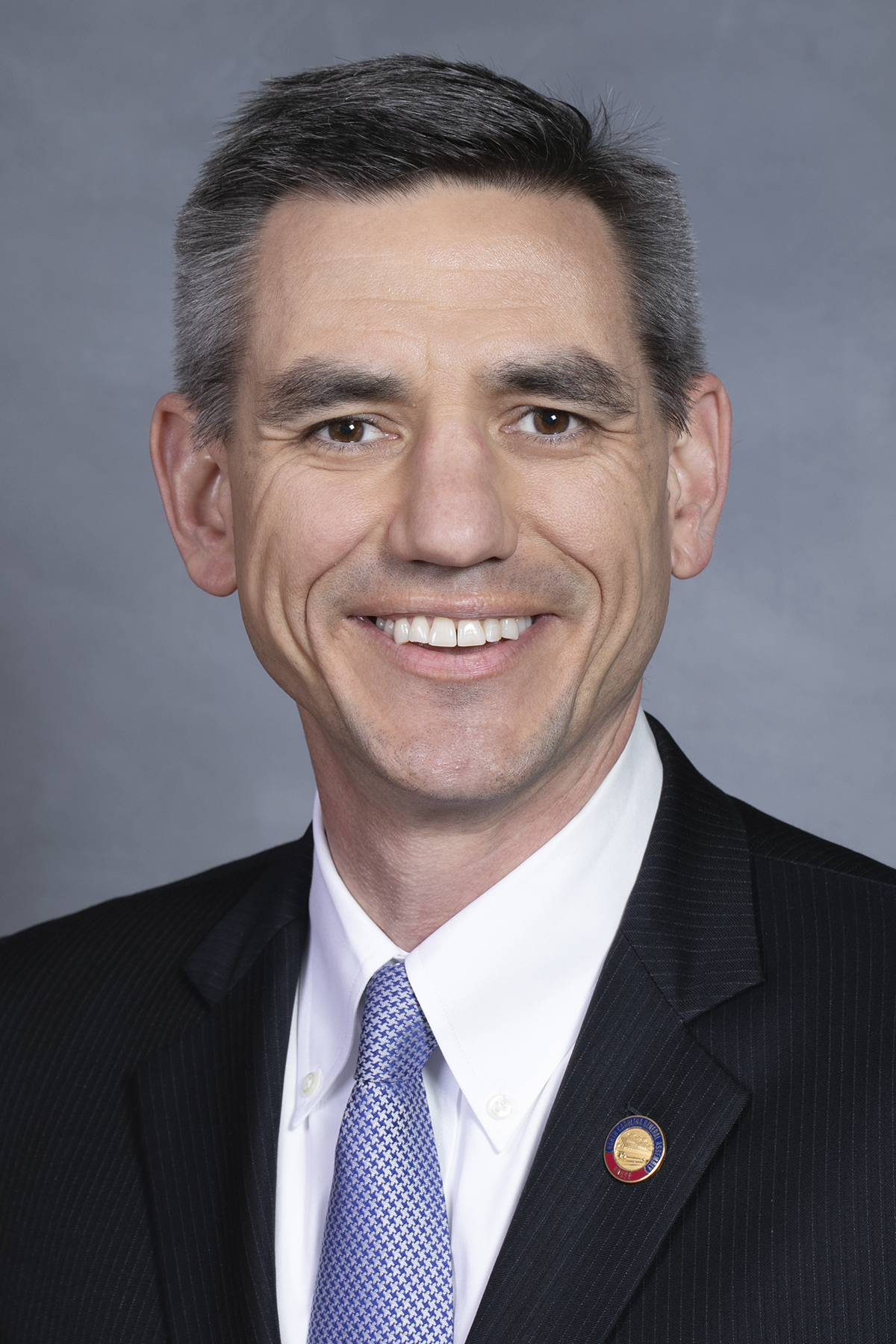

Member of the North Carolina House of Representatives from the 116th district
- Incumbent
- Assumed office January 1, 2025
- Preceded by: Caleb Rudow
- In office January 1, 2015 – January 1, 2023
- Preceded by: Tim Moffitt
- Succeeded by: Lindsey Prather (Redistricting)

Personal details
- Born: Brian Mills Turner Asheville, North Carolina, U.S.
- Party: Democratic
- Spouse: Hope Turpin Turner
- Education: Northwestern University (BA); Wake Forest University (MBA)
- Profession: Realtor
- Website: Campaign website

Brian Mills Turner is a Democratic member of the North Carolina House of Representatives. Turner represented the 116th district (including constituents in western Buncombe County) from 2015 to 2023 and again since 2025.

In November 2021, Turner announced that he wouldn't seek re-election in the 2022 election.

In 2023, following redistricting, Turner announced he would be seeking election to the newly drawn 116th district. He was elected to serve in the position again in 2024, facing no primary or general election opposition.

== Education and professional career ==
Turner earned a bachelor's degree in economics from Northwestern University in 1996 and a Master of Business Administration from the Babcock Graduate School of Management at Wake Forest University in 2010.

Before his election to public office, Turner worked as a television producer at MTV, as an executive at his family's manufacturing company, and as vice chancellor at University of North Carolina at Asheville. He currently works as a commercial real estate agent.

== Political career ==
In his first run for elected office in 2014, Turner defeated incumbent representative Tim Moffitt in a hotly contested race. He has been re-elected a total of 3 times, most recently in 2020. On November 29, 2021, Turner announced that he would not seek re-election.

In March 2023, Audubon North Carolina announced Turner would be joining as policy director.

In late 2023, following redistricting, Turner announced he would run for the newly drawn 116th district. He was elected in 2024, facing no opposition.

== Electoral history ==
=== 2024 ===
North Carolina House of Representatives 116th district general election, 2024
Party	Candidate	Votes	%
Democratic	Brian Turner	42,815	100.00%
Total votes		42,815	100%
Democratic hold			

=== 2020 ===
North Carolina House of Representatives 116th district general election, 2020
Party	Candidate	Votes	%
Democratic	Brian Turner (incumbent)	33,024	61.90%
Republican	Eric Burns	20,324	38.10%
Total votes		55,348	100%
Democratic hold			

=== 2018 ===
North Carolina House of Representatives 116th district general election, 2018
Party	Candidate	Votes	%
Democratic	Brian Turner (incumbent)	19,571	54.88%
Republican	Marilyn A. Brown	16,091	45.12%
Total votes		35,662	100%
Democratic hold			

=== 2016 ===
North Carolina House of Representatives 116th district general election, 2016
Party	Candidate	Votes	%
Democratic	Brian Turner (incumbent)	28,014	100%
Total votes		28,014	100%
Democratic hold			

=== 2014 ===
North Carolina House of Representatives 116th district general election, 2014
Party	Candidate	Votes	%
Democratic	Brian Turner	13,298	51.91%
Republican	Tim Moffitt (incumbent)	12,321	48.09%
Total votes		25,619	100%
Democratic gain from Republican			

== Committee assignments ==
=== 2021-2022 session ===
- Appropriations
- Appropriations - Agriculture and Natural and Economic Resources
- Wildlife Resources (Vice Chair)
- Alcoholic Beverage Control
- Education - Community Colleges
- Environment
- Marine Resources and Aqua Culture
- UNC BOG Nominations

=== 2019-2020 session ===
- Appropriations
- Appropriations - Agriculture and Natural and Economic Resources
- Wildlife Resources
- Alcoholic Beverage Control
- Education - Community Colleges
- Environment

=== 2017-2018 session ===
- Appropriations
- Appropriations - Information Technology
- Wildlife Resources
- Education - Community Colleges
- Education - Universities
- Judiciary III

=== 2015-2016 session ===
- Appropriations
- Appropriations - Agriculture and Natural and Economic Resources
- Homeland Security, Military, and Veterans Affairs

North Carolina House of Representatives
Preceded by Tim Moffitt	Member of the North Carolina House of Representatives from the 116th District; 2015–2023	Succeeded by Caleb Rudow
Preceded by Caleb Rudow	Member of the North Carolina House of Representatives from the 116th District; 2025–Present	Incumbent
