= Roy A. Taylor =

American politician

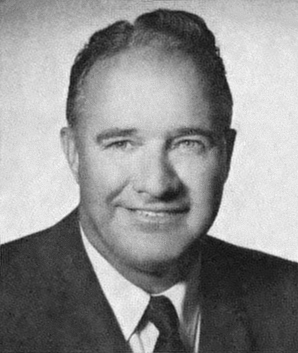
- Official portrait, 1969

Member of the U.S. House of Representatives from North Carolina
- In office June 25, 1960 – January 3, 1977
- Preceded by: David McKee Hall
- Succeeded by: V. Lamar Gudger
- Constituency: 12th district (1960–1963); 11th district (1963–1977)

Member of the North Carolina House of Representatives from Buncombe County
- In office November 5, 1946 – November 2, 1954
- Preceded by: George W. Craig
- Succeeded by: George W. Craig

Personal details
- Born: Roy Arthur Taylor; January 31, 1910 Vader, Washington, U.S.
- Died: November 28, 1995 (aged 85) Black Mountain, North Carolina, U.S.
- Party: Democratic
- Spouse: Evelyn Reeves (m. 1932)
- Education: Maryville College; Asheville University Law School
- Profession: Lawyer; politician

Military service
- Branch/service: United States Navy
- Years of service: 1943–1946
- Rank: Lieutenant
- Battles/wars: World War II; Pacific theater

Roy Arthur Taylor (January 31, 1910 – November 28, 1995) was a U.S. representative from North Carolina.

Born in Vader, Washington, Taylor graduated from Asheville-Biltmore College, Asheville, North Carolina, 1929. He graduated from Maryville College, Maryville, Tennessee, 1931. J.D., Asheville University Law School, Asheville, North Carolina, 1936. He was a lawyer in private practice. He was in the United States Navy from 1943 to 1946. He served as member of the North Carolina House of Representatives during the General Assembly's 1947, 1949, 1951, and 1953 regular sessions.

Taylor was elected as a Democrat to the Eighty-sixth Congress, by special election, to fill the vacancy caused by the death of United States Representative David M. Hall. He stood for re-election and was re-elected to eight succeeding Congresses and served from June 25, 1960, to January 3, 1977.

He was not a candidate for re-election to the Ninety-fifth Congress in 1976.

For much of his career in Congress, Taylor voted in favor of several progressive laws related to matters such as housing, the federal minimum wage, poverty alleviation, and healthcare, and during the early Sixties was associated with the liberal Kennedy Administration. From the mid-Sixties onwards, however, Taylor opposed various bills related to welfare, urban renewal and combating poverty.

In 1968, Taylor spoke about against the Poor People’s Campaign, arguing that America’s poor “would be better off if this group folded it tents and went home. Progress will be made only through a calm approach to progressive programs, not through the bull-horn demands of militants.”

In 1986, he received an honorary Doctor of Law from the University of North Carolina at Asheville

He died on November 28, 1995, in Black Mountain, North Carolina, and was interred in Mountain View Memorial Gardens in the same town.

U.S. House of Representatives
Preceded by David McKee Hall	Member of the U.S. House of Representatives from North Carolina's 12th congressional district 1960–1963	Succeeded by District inactive
Preceded by Basil Whitener	Member of the U.S. House of Representatives from North Carolina's 11th congressional district 1963–1977	Succeeded by V. Lamar Gudger
