= Susan C. Fisher =

American politician

Susan Fisher
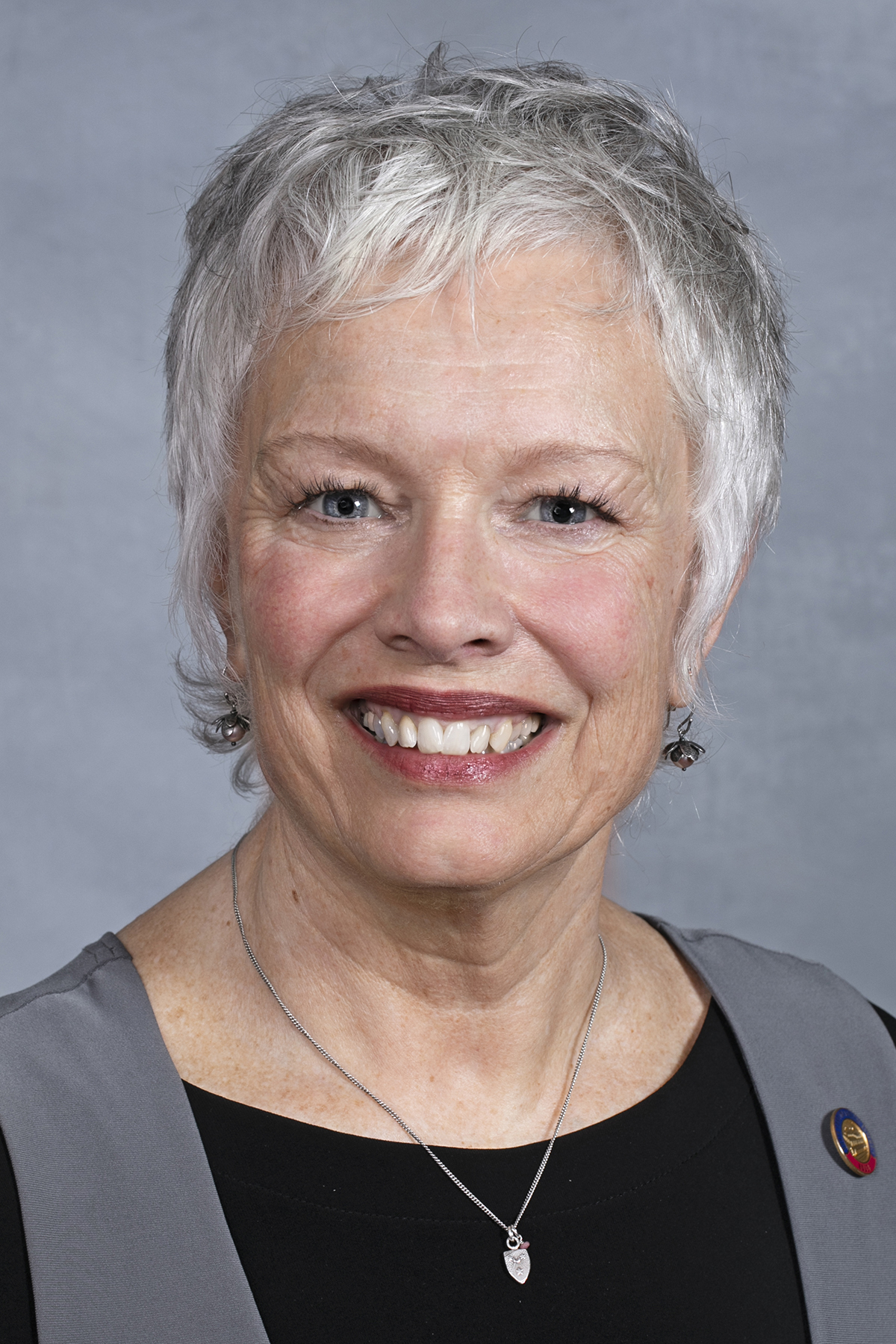

Member of the North Carolina House of Representatives from the 114th district
- In office February 6, 2004 – January 31, 2022
- Preceded by: Martin Nesbitt
- Succeeded by: Caleb Rudow

Deputy Minority Leader of the North Carolina House of Representatives
- In office January 1, 2015 – January 11, 2017
- Leader: Larry Hall
- Preceded by: Michael Wray
- Succeeded by: Robert Reives

Personal details
- Born: July 3, 1955 (age 71) Morganton, North Carolina, U.S.
- Party: Democratic
- Spouse: John
- Education: University of Maryland, College Park (BA)

Susan C. Fisher is an American politician who served as a member of the North Carolina House of Representatives for the 114th district from 2004 until her resignation in 2022. After the 2014 elections, Fisher was elected deputy leader by her House Democratic colleagues, she served in the role from 2015 until 2017.

== Electoral history ==
=== 2020 ===
North Carolina House of Representatives 114th district general election, 2020
Party	Candidate	Votes	%
Democratic	Susan Fisher (incumbent)	30,584	58.24%
Republican	Tim Hyatt	20,132	38.34%
Libertarian	Lyndon John Smith	1,794	3.42%
Total votes		62,510	100%
Democratic hold			

=== 2018 ===
North Carolina House of Representatives 114th district general election, 2018
Party	Candidate	Votes	%
Democratic	Susan Fisher (incumbent)	34,542	82.27%
Republican	Kris A. Lindstam	7,444	17.73%
Total votes		41,986	100%
Democratic hold			

=== 2016 ===
North Carolina House of Representatives 114th district general election, 2016
Party	Candidate	Votes	%
Democratic	Susan Fisher (incumbent)	39,243	100%
Total votes		39,243	100%
Democratic hold			

=== 2014 ===
North Carolina House of Representatives 114th district general election, 2014
Party	Candidate	Votes	%
Democratic	Susan Fisher (incumbent)	24,402	100%
Total votes		24,402	100%
Democratic hold			

=== 2012 ===
North Carolina House of Representatives 114th district general election, 2012
Party	Candidate	Votes	%
Democratic	Susan Fisher (incumbent)	34,719	100%
Total votes		34,719	100%
Democratic hold			

=== 2010 ===
North Carolina House of Representatives 114th district general election, 2010
Party	Candidate	Votes	%
Democratic	Susan Fisher (incumbent)	14,555	58.43%
Republican	John Carroll	10,356	41.57%
Total votes		24,911	100%
Democratic hold			

=== 2008 ===
North Carolina House of Representatives 114th district general election, 2008
Party	Candidate	Votes	%
Democratic	Susan Fisher (incumbent)	28,286	100%
Total votes		28,286	100%
Democratic hold			

=== 2006 ===
North Carolina House of Representatives 114th district general election, 2006
Party	Candidate	Votes	%
Democratic	Susan Fisher (incumbent)	16,073	64.28%
Republican	Mike Harrison	8,933	35.72%
Total votes		25,006	100%
Democratic hold			

=== 2004 ===
North Carolina House of Representatives 114th district general election, 2004
Party	Candidate	Votes	%
Democratic	Susan Fisher (incumbent)	19,098	61.95%
Republican	Bill Porter	11,729	38.05%
Total votes		30,827	100%
Democratic hold			

== Committee assignments ==
=== 2021-2022 session ===
- Appropriations
- Appropriations - Education
- Education - K-12 (Vice Chair)
- Alcoholic Beverage Control
- Election Law and Campaign Finance Reform
- Local Government - Land Use, Planning and Development

=== 2019-2020 session ===
- Appropriations
- Appropriations - Education
- Alcoholic Beverage Control (Vice Chair)
- Education - K-12
- Election Law and Campaign Finance Reform
- State and Local Government

=== 2017-2018 session ===
- Appropriations
- Appropriations - Education
- Alcoholic Beverage Control (Vice Chair)
- Elections and Ethics Law
- State and Local Government I
- Judiciary II
- Aging

=== 2015-2016 session ===
- Appropriations
- Appropriations - General Government (Vice-chair)
- Aging (Vice-chair)
- Alcoholic Beverage Control
- Education - K-12
- Elections
- Local Government

=== 2013-2014 session ===
- Appropriations
- Education
- Elections
- Government
- Banking
- Commerce and Job Development

=== 2011-2012 session ===
- Appropriations
- Education
- Elections
- Government
- Banking

=== 2009-2010 session ===
- Appropriations
- Education
- Election Law and Campaign Finance Reform
- Local Government I
- Energy and Energy Efficiency
- Judiciary III

North Carolina House of Representatives
Preceded by Martin Nesbitt	Member of the North Carolina House of Representatives from the 114th district 2004-2022	Succeeded by Caleb Rudow
Political offices
Preceded by Michael Wray	Deputy Minority Leader of the North Carolina House of Representatives; 2015-2017	Succeeded by Robert Reives
