= John Ager =

American politician from North Carolina

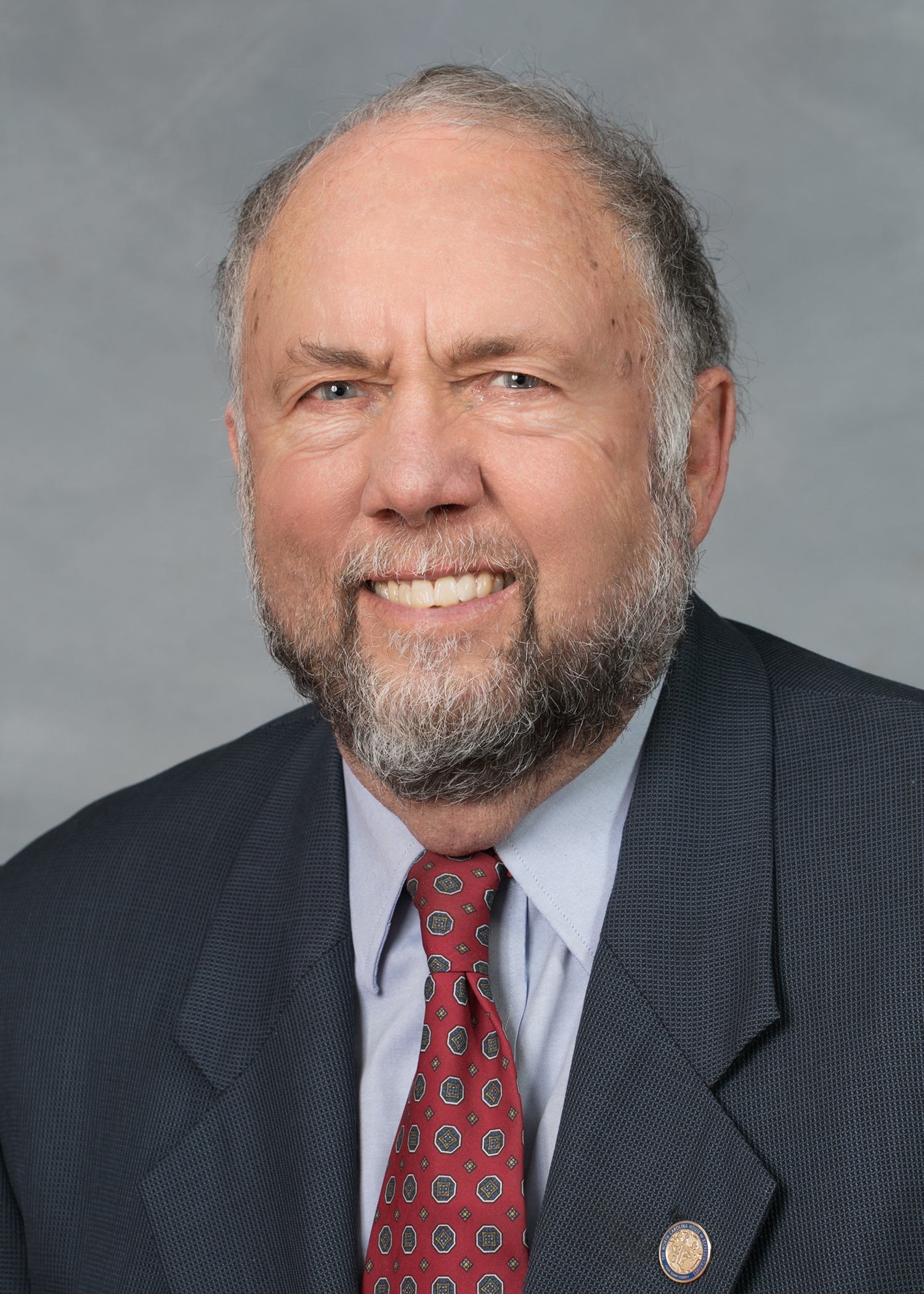
- Official portrait, 2017

Member of the North Carolina House of Representatives from the 115th district
- In office January 1, 2015 – January 1, 2023
- Preceded by: Nathan Ramsey
- Succeeded by: Eric Ager (redistricted)

Personal details
- Born: John Curtis Ager Jr. 1949 (age 76–77) Atlanta, Georgia, U.S.
- Party: Democratic
- Spouse: Annie
- Children: 4; including Eric and Jamie
- Education: Williams College (BA); University of North Carolina, Asheville (GrCert)
- Website: Campaign website

John Curtis Ager Jr. (born 1949) is a former Democratic politician from North Carolina. Ager served as a member of the North Carolina House of Representatives, representing the 115th district (including constituents in western Buncombe County) from 2015 to 2023. On December 6, 2021, Ager announced that he would not seek re-election in 2022.

== Political positions ==
In early 2018 Ager voiced support for background checks, waiting periods, and ending the "gun show loophole."

== Electoral history ==
=== 2024 ===
North Carolina Senate 46th district general election, 2024
Party	Candidate	Votes	%
Republican	Warren Daniel (incumbent)	68,675	65.23%
Democratic	John Ager	36,604	34.77%
Total votes		105,279	100%
Republican hold			

=== 2020 ===
North Carolina House of Representatives 115th district general election, 2020
Party	Candidate	Votes	%
Democratic	John Ager (incumbent)	31,650	62.31%
Republican	Mark Crawford	19,145	37.69%
Total votes		50,795	100%
Democratic hold			

=== 2018 ===
North Carolina House of Representatives 115th district general election, 2018
Party	Candidate	Votes	%
Democratic	John Ager (incumbent)	23,683	58.28%
Republican	Amy Evans	16,953	41.72%
Total votes		40,636	100%
Democratic hold			

=== 2016 ===
North Carolina House of Representatives 115th district general election, 2016
Party	Candidate	Votes	%
Democratic	John Ager (incumbent)	25,257	55.58%
Republican	Frank Mortez	20,183	44.42%
Total votes		40,636	100%
Democratic hold			

=== 2014 ===
North Carolina House of Representatives 115th district general election, 2014
Party	Candidate	Votes	%
Democratic	John Ager	15,523	50.81%
Republican	Nathan Ramsey (incumbent)	15,027	49.19%
Total votes		30,550	100%
Democratic gain from Republican			

== Committee assignments ==
=== 2021–2022 session ===
- Appropriations
- Appropriations - Agriculture and Natural and Economic Resources
- Agriculture
- Environment
- Local Government
- Regulatory Reform
- Wildlife Resources

=== 2019–2020 session ===
- Appropriations
- Appropriations - Agriculture and Natural and Economic Resources
- Agriculture
- State and Local Government
- Regulatory Reform
- Wildlife Resources

=== 2017–2018 session ===
- Appropriations
- Appropriations - Agriculture and Natural and Economic Resources
- Appropriations - General Government
- Agriculture
- State and Local Government
- Education - K-12

=== 2015–2016 session ===
- Appropriations
- Appropriations - General Government
- Agriculture
- Local Government
- Wildlife Resources
- Education - K-12
- Children, Youth and Families
- Judiciary IV
