= North Carolina's 11th congressional district =

U.S. House district for North Carolina

Coordinates: 35.37°N 82.94°W

- Interactive map of district boundaries since January 3, 2025 (Note: As the mid-decade redistricting bill (S249) enacted on October 22, 2025 only changed the compositions of North Carolina's 1st and 3rd congressional districts, boundaries of other districts will not change at the 2026 elections.)
- Representative: Chuck Edwards; R–Flat Rock, Henderson County
- Population (2025): 770,806
- Median household income: $67,908
- Ethnicity: 82.3% White; 7.7% Hispanic; 3.9% Two or more races; 3.3% Black; 1.5% Native American; 0.9% Asian; 0.5% other
- Cook PVI: R+5

North Carolina's 11th congressional district encompasses most of Western North Carolina. Since January 3, 2023, the district has been represented by Chuck Edwards.

The 11th district has historically been known for its volatile politics and was once considered one of the most competitive congressional districts in North Carolina. It was traditionally anchored by the heavily Democratic city of Asheville, with the rest of the district being split between Democratic-leaning counties in the south and Republican-leaning counties in the north. Consequently, congressional races were historically hard-fought and often very close.

In 2011, the Republican-controlled General Assembly redrew the district, shifting much of Asheville to the 10th district, where the city's Democratic tilt was diluted by the overwhelming Republican inclination of the rest of the district. The new map split Asheville in such a way that in some neighborhoods, one side of the street moved to the 10th while the other side of the street stayed in the 11th.

To make up for the loss in population, the 11th absorbed some strongly Republican territory in the Foothills which had previously been in the 10th. On paper, it was one of the most Republican districts in the state. Due to the district becoming much more conservative, three-term Democratic incumbent Heath Shuler did not run for reelection in 2012, and was succeeded by Republican Mark Meadows.

In 2019, a panel of North Carolina judges ruled that the existing map was a partisan gerrymander, and ordered new congressional districts to be drawn ahead of the 2020 election. After review in December, a new map was approved. The district included the western part of Rutherford County and the entirety of Avery, Buncombe, Cherokee, Clay, Graham, Haywood, Henderson, Jackson, Macon, Madison, McDowell, Mitchell, Polk, Swain, Transylvania, and Yancey Counties. It still leans Republican, but much less so than the previous iteration, as it once again includes all of Asheville.

On February 23, 2022, the North Carolina Supreme Court approved a new map only for the 2022 United States House of Representatives elections which had removed Avery and Mitchell Counties from the district.

On October 25, 2023, the North Carolina General Assembly redrew and approved a new congressional map adding Avery, and Mitchell counties back to the district while removing Rutherford County, and splitting Polk County, shifting those over to the 14th congressional district.

== Counties ==
For the 119th and successive Congresses (based on the districts drawn following a 2023 legislative session), the district contains all or portions of the following counties and communities.

Avery County (9)

All nine communities

Buncombe County (13)

All 13 communities

Cherokee County (3)

All three communities

Clay County (1)

Hayesville

Graham County (3)

All three communities

Haywood County (6)

All six communities

Henderson County (18)

All 18 communities

Jackson County (9)

All nine communities

Macon County (2)

Franklin, Highlands (shared with Jackson County)

Madison County (3)

All three communities

McDowell County (5)

All five communities

Mitchell County (2)

Bakersville, Spruce Pine

Polk County (2)

Columbus (part; also 14th), Saluda

Swain County (3)

All three communities

Transylvania County (2)

Brevard, Rosman

Yancey County (1)

Burnsville

== Recent election results from statewide races ==
=== 2025-2027 boundaries ===
Year	Office	Results
2008	President	McCain 52% - 46%
2008	Senate	Hagan 49% - 47%
2008	Governor	Perdue 50% - 46%
2010	Senate	Burr 57% - 41%
2012	President	Romney 56% - 44%
2012	Governor	McCrory 56% - 41%
2014	Senate	Tillis 51% - 45%
2016	President	Trump 56% - 40%
2016	Senate	Burr 55% - 41%
2016	Governor	McCrory 51% - 46%
2016	Lt. Governor	Forest 55% - 41%
2016	Secretary of State	LaPaglia 52% - 48%
2016	Auditor	Stuber 54% - 46%
2016	Treasurer	Folwell 57% - 43%
2016	Attorney General	Newton 54% - 46%
2020	President	Trump 55% - 44%
2020	Senate	Tillis 53% - 43%
2020	Governor	Forest 52% - 47%
2020	Lt. Governor	Robinson 56% - 44%
2020	Secretary of State	Sykes 54% - 46%
2020	Auditor	Street 54% - 46%
2020	Treasurer	Folwell 57% - 43%
2020	Attorney General	O'Neill 55% - 45%
2022	Senate	Budd 53% - 44%
2024	President	Trump 54% - 44%
2024	Governor	Stein 51% - 44%
2024	Lt. Governor	Weatherman 51% - 46%
2024	Secretary of State	Brown 53% - 47%
2024	Auditor	Boliek 52% - 45%
2024	Treasurer	Briner 55% - 45%
2024	Attorney General	Bishop 52% - 48%

=== 2027-2033 boundaries ===
Year	Office	Results
2008	President	McCain 52%-46%
2008	Senate	Hagan 49%-48%
2008	Governor	Perdue 50%-46%
2010	Senate	Burr 57%-41%
2012	President	Romney 44%-57%
2012	Governor	McCrory 56%-41%
2014	Senate	Tillis 51%-45%
2016	President	Trump 56%-40%
2016	Senate	Burr 55%-41%
2016	Governor	McCrory 51%-46%
2020	President	Trump 55%-44%
2020	Senate	Tillis 53%-43%
2020	Governor	Forest 52%-47%
2022	Senate	Budd 53%-44%
2024	President	Trump 54%-45%
2024	Governor	Stein 52%-44%

== List of members representing the district ==
Member (Residence)	Party	Years	Cong ress	Electoral history	District location
District established March 4, 1803
James Holland (Rutherfordton)	Democratic-Republican	March 4, 1803 – March 3, 1811	8th 9th 10th 11th	Redistricted from the 1st district and re-elected in 1803. Re-elected in 1804. Re-elected in 1806. Re-elected in 1808. Retired.	1803–1813 "North Carolina congressional district map (1803–13)".
Israel Pickens (Morgantown)	Democratic-Republican	March 4, 1811 – March 3, 1813	12th	Elected in 1810. Redistricted to the 12th district.	1803–1813 "North Carolina congressional district map (1803–13)".
Peter Forney (Lincolnton)	Democratic-Republican	March 4, 1813 – March 3, 1815	13th	Elected in 1813. Retired.	1813–1823 "North Carolina congressional district map (1813–43)".
Daniel M. Forney (Lincolnton)	Democratic-Republican	March 4, 1815 – 1818	14th 15th	Elected in 1815. Re-elected in 1817. Resigned.	1813–1823 "North Carolina congressional district map (1813–43)".
William Davidson (Charlotte)	Federalist	December 2, 1818 – March 3, 1821	15th 16th	Elected November 7, 1818 to finish Forney's term and seated December 2, 1818. Re-elected in 1819. Lost re-election.	1813–1823 "North Carolina congressional district map (1813–43)".
Henry W. Connor (Sherrills Ford)	Democratic-Republican (Note: Supported the Jackson faction in the 1824 United States presidential election.)	March 4, 1821 – March 3, 1825	17th 18th 19th 20th 21st 22nd 23rd 24th 25th 26th	Elected in 1821. Re-elected in 1823. Re-elected in 1825. Re-elected in 1827. Re-elected in 1829. Re-elected in 1831. Re-elected in 1833. Re-elected in 1835. Re-elected in 1837. Re-elected in 1839. Retired.	1813–1823 "North Carolina congressional district map (1813–43)".
Henry W. Connor (Sherrills Ford)	Democratic-Republican	March 4, 1821 – March 3, 1825	17th 18th 19th 20th 21st 22nd 23rd 24th 25th 26th	Elected in 1821. Re-elected in 1823. Re-elected in 1825. Re-elected in 1827. Re-elected in 1829. Re-elected in 1831. Re-elected in 1833. Re-elected in 1835. Re-elected in 1837. Re-elected in 1839. Retired.	1823–1833 "North Carolina congressional district map (1813–43)".
Henry W. Connor (Sherrills Ford)	Jacksonian	March 4, 1825 – March 3, 1837	17th 18th 19th 20th 21st 22nd 23rd 24th 25th 26th	Elected in 1821. Re-elected in 1823. Re-elected in 1825. Re-elected in 1827. Re-elected in 1829. Re-elected in 1831. Re-elected in 1833. Re-elected in 1835. Re-elected in 1837. Re-elected in 1839. Retired.	1823–1833 "North Carolina congressional district map (1813–43)".
Henry W. Connor (Sherrills Ford)	Jacksonian	March 4, 1825 – March 3, 1837	17th 18th 19th 20th 21st 22nd 23rd 24th 25th 26th	Elected in 1821. Re-elected in 1823. Re-elected in 1825. Re-elected in 1827. Re-elected in 1829. Re-elected in 1831. Re-elected in 1833. Re-elected in 1835. Re-elected in 1837. Re-elected in 1839. Retired.	1833–1843 "North Carolina congressional district map (1813–43)".
Henry W. Connor (Sherrills Ford)	Democratic	March 4, 1837 – March 3, 1841	17th 18th 19th 20th 21st 22nd 23rd 24th 25th 26th	Elected in 1821. Re-elected in 1823. Re-elected in 1825. Re-elected in 1827. Re-elected in 1829. Re-elected in 1831. Re-elected in 1833. Re-elected in 1835. Re-elected in 1837. Re-elected in 1839. Retired.	1833–1843 "North Carolina congressional district map (1813–43)".
Greene W. Caldwell (Charlotte)	Democratic	March 4, 1841 – March 3, 1843	27th	Elected in 1841. Retired.	1833–1843 "North Carolina congressional district map (1813–43)".
District dissolved March 4, 1843
District re-established March 3, 1933
Zebulon Weaver (Asheville)	Democratic	March 4, 1933 – January 3, 1943	73rd 74th 75th 76th 77th	Redistricted from the 10th district and re-elected in 1932. Re-elected in 1934. Re-elected in 1936. Re-elected in 1938. Re-elected in 1940. Redistricted to the 12th district.	1933–1943 [data missing]
Alfred L. Bulwinkle (Gastonia)	Democratic	January 3, 1943 – August 31, 1950	78th 79th 80th 81st	Redistricted from the 10th district and re-elected in 1942. Re-elected in 1944. Re-elected in 1946. Re-elected in 1948. Died.	1943–1953 [data missing]
Vacant		August 31, 1950 – November 7, 1950	81st		1943–1953 [data missing]
Woodrow W. Jones (Rutherfordton)	Democratic	November 7, 1950 – January 3, 1957	81st 82nd 83rd 84th	Elected to finish Bulwinkle's term. Also elected in 1950 to the next term. Re-elected in 1952. Re-elected in 1954. Retired.	1943–1953 [data missing]
Woodrow W. Jones (Rutherfordton)	Democratic	November 7, 1950 – January 3, 1957	81st 82nd 83rd 84th	Elected to finish Bulwinkle's term. Also elected in 1950 to the next term. Re-elected in 1952. Re-elected in 1954. Retired.	1953–1963 [data missing]
Basil Whitener (Gastonia)	Democratic	January 3, 1957 – January 3, 1963	85th 86th 87th	Elected in 1956. Re-elected in 1958. Re-elected in 1960. Redistricted to the 10th district.	1953–1963 [data missing]
Roy A. Taylor (Black Mountain)	Democratic	January 3, 1963 – January 3, 1977	88th 89th 90th 91st 92nd 93rd 94th	Redistricted from the 12th district and re-elected in 1962. Re-elected in 1964. Re-elected in 1966. Re-elected in 1968. Re-elected in 1970. Re-elected in 1972. Re-elected in 1974. Retired.	1963–1973 [data missing]
Roy A. Taylor (Black Mountain)	Democratic	January 3, 1963 – January 3, 1977	88th 89th 90th 91st 92nd 93rd 94th	Redistricted from the 12th district and re-elected in 1962. Re-elected in 1964. Re-elected in 1966. Re-elected in 1968. Re-elected in 1970. Re-elected in 1972. Re-elected in 1974. Retired.	1973–1983 [data missing]
V. Lamar Gudger (Asheville)	Democratic	January 3, 1977 – January 3, 1981	95th 96th	Elected in 1976. Re-elected in 1978. Lost re-election.	1973–1983 [data missing]
Bill Hendon (Asheville)	Republican	January 3, 1981 – January 3, 1983	97th	Elected in 1980. Lost re-election.	1973–1983 [data missing]
James M. Clarke (Fairview)	Democratic	January 3, 1983 – January 3, 1985	98th	Elected in 1982. Lost re-election.	1983–1993 [data missing]
Bill Hendon (Asheville)	Republican	January 3, 1985 – January 3, 1987	99th	Elected in 1984. Lost re-election.	1983–1993 [data missing]
James M. Clarke (Fairview)	Democratic	January 3, 1987 – January 3, 1991	100th 101st	Elected in 1986. Re-elected in 1988. Lost re-election.	1983–1993 [data missing]
Charles H. Taylor (Brevard)	Republican	January 3, 1991 – January 3, 2007	102nd 103rd 104th 105th 106th 107th 108th 109th	Elected in 1990. Re-elected in 1992. Re-elected in 1994. Re-elected in 1996. Re-elected in 1998. Re-elected in 2000. Re-elected in 2002. Re-elected in 2004. Lost re-election.	1983–1993 [data missing]
Charles H. Taylor (Brevard)	Republican	January 3, 1991 – January 3, 2007	102nd 103rd 104th 105th 106th 107th 108th 109th	Elected in 1990. Re-elected in 1992. Re-elected in 1994. Re-elected in 1996. Re-elected in 1998. Re-elected in 2000. Re-elected in 2002. Re-elected in 2004. Lost re-election.	1993–2003 [data missing]
Charles H. Taylor (Brevard)	Republican	January 3, 1991 – January 3, 2007	102nd 103rd 104th 105th 106th 107th 108th 109th	Elected in 1990. Re-elected in 1992. Re-elected in 1994. Re-elected in 1996. Re-elected in 1998. Re-elected in 2000. Re-elected in 2002. Re-elected in 2004. Lost re-election.	2003–2013
Heath Shuler (Waynesville)	Democratic	January 3, 2007 – January 3, 2013	110th 111th 112th	Elected in 2006. Re-elected in 2008. Re-elected in 2010. Retired.	2003–2013
Mark Meadows (Skyland)	Republican	January 3, 2013 – March 30, 2020	113th 114th 115th 116th	Elected in 2012. Re-elected in 2014. Re-elected in 2016. Re-elected in 2018. Resigned to become White House Chief of Staff.	2013–2017
Mark Meadows (Skyland)	Republican	January 3, 2013 – March 30, 2020	113th 114th 115th 116th	Elected in 2012. Re-elected in 2014. Re-elected in 2016. Re-elected in 2018. Resigned to become White House Chief of Staff.	2017–2021
Vacant		March 30, 2020 – January 3, 2021	116th		2017–2021
Madison Cawthorn (Hendersonville)	Republican	January 3, 2021 – January 3, 2023	117th	Elected in 2020. Lost re-nomination.	2021–2023
Chuck Edwards (Flat Rock)	Republican	January 3, 2023 – present	118th 119th	Elected in 2022. Re-elected in 2024. Renominated, then withdrew after ethics investigation.	2023–2025
Chuck Edwards (Flat Rock)	Republican	January 3, 2023 – present	118th 119th	Elected in 2022. Re-elected in 2024. Renominated, then withdrew after ethics investigation.	2025–present
Jamie Ager (Fairview)	Democratic	Taking office on January 3, 2027		Elected in 2026.	

== Past election results ==
=== 2006 ===
2006 North Carolina's 11th congressional district election
Party	Candidate	Votes	%
Democratic	Heath Shuler	124,972	53.79
Republican	Charles H. Taylor (incumbent)	107,342	46.21
Total votes		232,314	100
Democratic gain from Republican			

=== 2008 ===
2008 North Carolina's 11th congressional district election
Party	Candidate	Votes	%
Democratic	Heath Shuler (incumbent)	211,112	61.96
Republican	Carl Mumpower	122,087	35.83
Libertarian	Keith Smith	7,517	2.21
Total votes		340,716	100
Democratic hold			

=== 2010 ===
2010 North Carolina's 11th congressional district election
Party	Candidate	Votes	%
Democratic	Heath Shuler (incumbent)	131,225	54.34
Republican	Jeff Miller	110,246	45.66
Total votes		241,741	100.00
Democratic hold			

=== 2012 ===
2012 North Carolina's 11th congressional district election
Party	Candidate	Votes	%
Republican	Mark Meadows	190,319	57.4
Democratic	Hayden Rogers	141,107	42.6
Total votes		331,426	100.0
Republican gain from Democratic			

=== 2014 ===
2014 North Carolina's 11th congressional district election
Party	Candidate	Votes	%
Republican	Mark Meadows (incumbent)	144,682	62.9
Democratic	Tom Hill	85,342	37.1
Total votes		230,024	100.0
Republican hold			

=== 2016 ===
2016 North Carolina's 11th congressional district election
Party	Candidate	Votes	%
Republican	Mark Meadows (incumbent)	230,405	64.1
Democratic	Rick Bryson	129,103	35.9
Total votes		359,508	100.0
Republican hold			

=== 2018 ===
2018 North Carolina's 11th congressional district election
Party	Candidate	Votes	%
Republican	Mark Meadows (incumbent)	178,012	59.2
Democratic	Phillip Price	116,508	38.8
Libertarian	Clifton Ingram	6,146	2.0
Total votes		300,666	100.0
Republican hold			

=== 2020 ===
2020 North Carolina's 11th congressional district election
Party	Candidate	Votes	%
Republican	Madison Cawthorn	245,351	54.5
Democratic	Moe Davis	190,609	42.4
Libertarian	Tracey DeBruhl	8,682	1.9
Green	Tamara Zwinak	5,503	1.2
Total votes		450,145	100.0
Republican hold			

=== 2022 ===
2022 North Carolina's 11th congressional district election
Party	Candidate	Votes	%
Republican	Chuck Edwards	174,232	53.79
Democratic	Jasmine Beach-Ferrara	144,165	44.51
Libertarian	David Coatney	5,515	1.70
Total votes		323,912	100.00
Republican hold			

=== 2024 ===
2024 North Carolina's 11th congressional district election
Party	Candidate	Votes	%
Republican	Chuck Edwards (incumbent)	245,546	56.8
Democratic	Caleb Rudow	186,977	43.2
Total votes		432,523	100.0
Republican hold			

== See also ==
- List of United States congressional districts
- North Carolina's congressional districts
