= Atılım University =

Turkish private university located in Ankara

- Atılım Üniversitesi
- Motto: Make Your Mark on The Future
- Type: Private (Foundation university)
- Established: 1996
- Rector: Serkan ERYILMAZ
- Students: +10.000
- Location: Ankara, Turkey; 39.81351°N 32.72368°E
- Campus: 250 acres (100 ha)
- Language: English & Turkish
- Colors: Blue and Red
- Website: atilim.edu.tr

University rankings

Global – Overall
- THE World: 1201–1500 (2024)

Regional – Overall
- QS Emerging Europe and Central Asia: 251–300 (2022)

Atılım University (In Turkish: Atılım Üniversitesi) is a private university established in 1996. It is located in Ankara, the capital of Turkey. The language of instruction for most courses is English. Education programs are at international standards (e.g. ABET 2000).

== Description ==
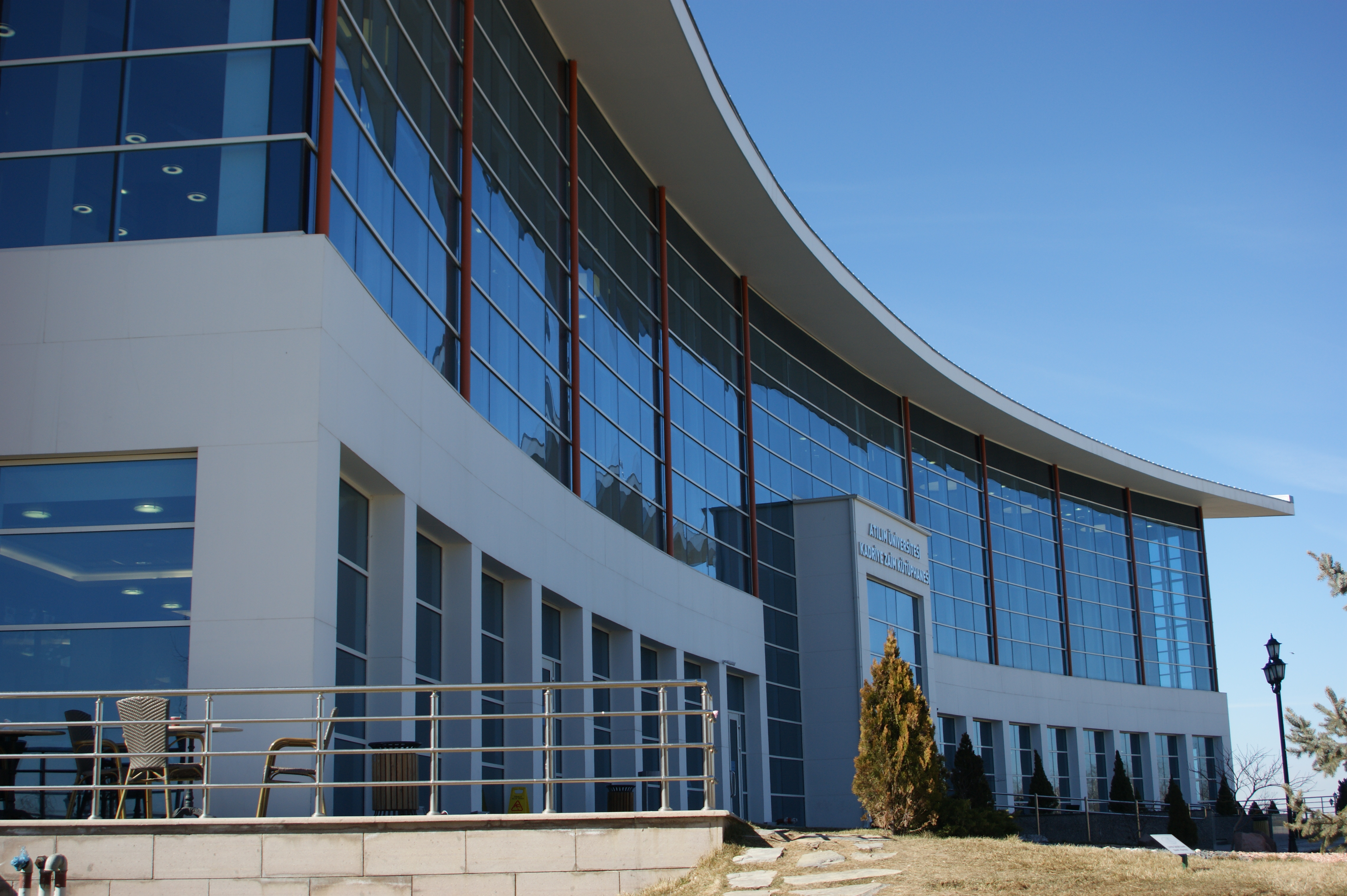
Atılım University library

Atilim University was founded on 15 July 1997 by the Atilim Foundation, which was established in 1996. It was founded to serve as a Foundation University in the capacity of a legal entity pursuant to provisions of Law no. 2547 concerning the Foundation of Higher Education Institutes.

Atilim University is considered to be among the best universities in Turkey. Leading programs at Atilim University include Business Administration, Engineering, and English Translation and Interpretation.

The university has funded notable undergraduate research projects, such as the development of fuel cell systems for space applications and solar-hydrogen hybrid energy systems, with support from the Scientific and Technological Research Council of Turkey (TÜBITAK). These projects contributed to the university's reputation in renewable energy research.

Atılım University has 54 student clubs and societies.

Atılım University is a sister university to the University of the Incarnate Word in San Antonio, Texas, and 31 European universities in Germany, Sweden, Belgium, United Kingdom, Czech Republic, Denmark, Estonia, Finland, France, Greece, Hungary, Italy, Ireland, Lithuania, Poland, Romania, Slovakia, Slovenia, Spain, and the Netherlands. These universities collaborate with Atılım University under the scope of the Erasmus Programme. Atılım is also among the Erasmus University Charter universities.

== Academic Units ==
=== Faculties ===
1. Faculty of Engineering
  - Department of Aerospace Engineering
  - Department of Automotive Engineering
  - Department of Civil Engineering
  - Department of Chemical Engineering
  - Department of Computer Engineering
  - Department of Electrical & Electronics Engineering
  - Department of Energy Systems Engineering
  - Department of Industrial Engineering
  - Department of Information Systems Engineering
  - Department of Information Systems Engineering UOLP
  - Department of Mechatronics Engineering
  - Department of Manufacturing Engineering
  - Department of Materials Engineering
  - Department of Mechanical Engineering
  - Department of Software Engineering
2. Faculty of Management
  - Department of Economics
  - Department of Economics in Turkish Medium
  - Department of International Relations
  - Department of International Logistics And Transportation
  - Department of Management
  - Department of Management in Turkish Medium
  - Department of Public Relations and Advertising
  - Department of Political Science and Public Administration in Turkish Medium
  - Department of Tourism Management
3. Faculty of Art, Design and Architecture
  - Department of Graphic Design
  - Department of Interior Architecture and Environmental Design
  - Department of Fashion & Textile Design
  - Department of Industrial Product Design
  - Department of Architecture
4. Faculty of Arts & Sciences
  - Department of Mathematics
  - Department of English Language and Literature
  - Department of Translation and Interpretation
  - Department of Psychology
5. Faculty of Law
6. Faculty of Medicine

=== Institutes ===
- Graduate School of Natural & Applied Sciences
- Graduate School of Social Sciences

=== Service Courses Units ===
- Departmental English Language Studies Unit (DELSU)
- Physics Group
- Chemistry Group

=== English Preparatory School ===
- Preparatory School

=== Research and Application Centers ===
- AWAC – Academic Writing & Advisory Center
- EDM – Electric Discharge Machining
- Science Entertainment Center
- ETPO – Educational Technologies and Pedagogy Office
- KASAUM – Woman Issues Study Center
- MFCE – Metal Forming Centre of Excellence
- RoTAM – Robot Technologies Application and Research Center
- Continuous Education Application and Research Center
- TÜTAM – Turkey's History Study and Research Center
- UTAM – Space Technologies Application and Research Center
- SaVTAM – Defense Technologies Application and Research Center
- Logistic Simulation and Application Center
- Performance Management Application and Research Centre
- Railway Materials Application and Research Center

=== Research laboratories ===
- EERL – European Remote Radio Laboratory
- Biophysics Laboratory
- Biochemistry Research Laboratory
- SEAL – Politic and Economic Researches Laboratory
- @NANO – Nanoscopy Laboratory
- SAEL – Social Sciences Research and Training Laboratory
- ATOMSEL – Optoelectronic Materials and Solar Energy Laboratory
- AYAL – Structural Acoustic Laboratory
- Polymer Composite Biocompatibility Research Laboratory
- FlyRoVeL – Flying Robotics and Robotic Vehicles Laboratory

== Notable alumni ==
Atılım University has a diverse group of alumni who have made significant contributions in various fields:

- Nihat Ergün – Former Minister of Science, Industry and Technology in Turkey, contributing significantly to the development of Turkey's industrial and technological policies.
- Dilek Hanif – Renowned fashion designer who has showcased her work globally and continues to influence the fashion industry with her innovative designs.
- Emre Aydın – Award-winning musician and songwriter known for his impactful contributions to Turkish pop and rock music.
