= V. Lamar Gudger =

American politician (1929–2004)

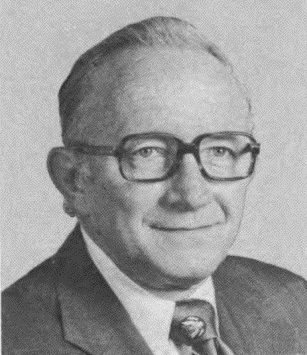
- Official portrait, 1977

Member of the U.S. House of Representatives from North Carolina's 11th district
- In office January 3, 1977 – January 3, 1981
- Preceded by: Roy A. Taylor
- Succeeded by: Bill Hendon

Member of the North Carolina Senate
- In office November 3, 1970 – January 1, 1977 Serving with I. C. Crawford
- Preceded by: R. Theodore Dent Jr.
- Succeeded by: Robert S. Swain
- Constituency: 31st district (1970–1973); 26th district (1973–1977)

Member of the North Carolina House of Representatives from Buncombe County
- In office November 7, 1950 – November 4, 1952 Serving with Roy A. Taylor and Claude Love
- Preceded by: Leslie H. McDaniel
- Succeeded by: John Y. Jordan Jr.

Personal details
- Born: Vonno Lamar Gudger Jr. April 30, 1919 Asheville, North Carolina
- Died: August 2, 2004 (aged 85) Asheville, North Carolina
- Resting place: Arlington National Cemetery
- Party: Democratic
- Spouse: Eugenia Reid (m. 1947)
- Education: University of North Carolina (BA, LLB)
- Occupation: Lawyer; politician

Military service
- Branch/service: United States Army; Army Air Forces
- Years of service: 1942–1945
- Rank: Captain
- Unit: 306th Bombardment Group, Eighth Air Force
- Battles/wars: World War II; European theater
- Awards: Distinguished Flying Cross; Air Medal

Vonno Lamar Gudger Jr. (April 30, 1919 – August 2, 2004) represented North Carolina's 11th congressional district in the United States House of Representatives from 1977 to 1981. Gudger, who was born in Asheville, had several degrees from the University of North Carolina, served in the United States Army Air Forces from 1942 to 1945, and subsequently became a lawyer, serving as solicitor for the state from 1952 to 1954. He was elected to the North Carolina House of Representatives from 1951 to 1952 and a member of the North Carolina Senate from 1971 to 1977 before his election to the federal Congress. Following an unsuccessful 1980 reelection campaign, he served as a Buncombe County special superior court judge from 1984 to 1989.

He died on August 2, 2004, and was buried at Arlington National Cemetery.

North Carolina House of Representatives
Preceded by Leslie H. McDaniel	Member of the North Carolina House of Representatives from Buncombe County; 1950–1952; Served alongside: Roy A. Taylor, Claude Love	Succeeded by John Y. Jordan Jr.
North Carolina Senate
Preceded by R. Theodore Dent Jr.	Member of the North Carolina Senate from the 31st district 1970–1973; Served alongside: I. C. Crawford	Succeeded by District abolished
Preceded by Bobby Lee Combs; Norman Joyner	Member of the North Carolina Senate from the 26th district 1973–1977; Served alongside: I. C. Crawford	Succeeded by Robert S. Swain
U.S. House of Representatives
Preceded by Roy A. Taylor	Member of the U.S. House of Representatives from North Carolina's 11th congressional district 1977–1981	Succeeded by Bill Hendon
