= 2024 North Carolina gubernatorial election =

- November 5, 2024
- Turnout: 73.73% (▼1.62 pp)
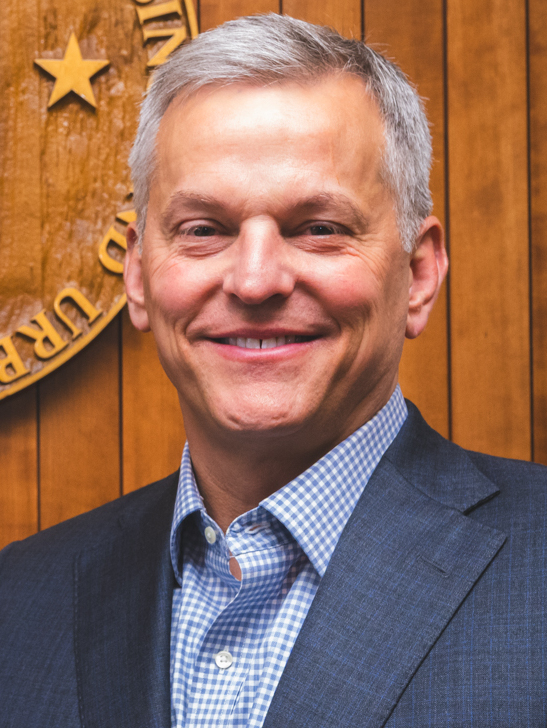

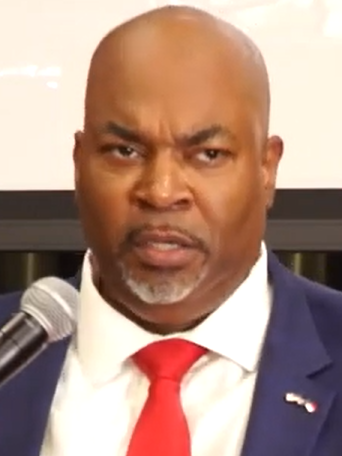
Nominee	Josh Stein	Mark Robinson
Party	Democratic	Republican
Popular vote	3,069,496	2,241,309
Percentage	54.90%	40.08%
- Stein: 40–50% 50–60% 60–70% 70–80% 80–90% >90% Robinson: 40–50% 50–60% 60–70% 70–80% 80–90% >90% No votes
Governor before election
Roy Cooper
Democratic
Elected Governor
Josh Stein
Democratic

The 2024 North Carolina gubernatorial election was held on November 5, 2024, to elect the governor of North Carolina. It was held concurrently with the 2024 presidential election and other elections. Democratic state attorney general Josh Stein defeated Republican lieutenant governor Mark Robinson. He succeeded Democratic incumbent Roy Cooper, who was term-limited.

Primary elections took place on March 5, 2024. Stein won the Democratic nomination with 70% of the vote over former state Supreme Court Justice Michael R. Morgan and Robinson won the Republican nomination with 65% of the vote over state treasurer Dale Folwell.

Initially a tight race, Robinson's history of controversial statements and revelations of comments he made on a pornographic website led to Stein gaining a significant polling advantage. Stein went on to win the election by 14.8 percentage points, the largest margin for a gubernatorial candidate in North Carolina since Jim Hunt in 1980, as well as winning counties that had not voted Democratic since 2008 (Franklin and Jackson), 2004 (Alamance, Brunswick, and Transylvania), and 1980 (Cabarrus and Henderson). Stein was also the only Democrat in 2024 to win a gubernatorial race in a state Donald Trump won in the concurrent presidential race. Robinson became the first Republican gubernatorial candidate since 1976 to not flip a county in the state.

Stein received more than three million votes, the most of any candidate in the history of statewide elections in North Carolina. He is the first Jewish governor of the state. Analysts have credited Stein's large margin of victory with helping down-ballot Democrats in concurrent elections. Stein received 354,121 more votes than Harris, while Robinson received 657,114 votes less than Trump. According to exit polls, Stein won independent voters by 23 percentage points, which contributed to Robinson's defeat. Following his loss, Robinson retired from politics.

== Background ==
A typical swing state, North Carolina is considered to be a purple to slightly red southern state at the federal level. Both U.S. senators from the state are members of the Republican Party. Democrats and Republicans both hold multiple statewide offices in North Carolina. In the 2020 presidential election, Donald Trump carried North Carolina by 1.34 percentage points, the smallest margin among the states he won.

Incumbent Roy Cooper was first elected in 2016, defeating then-incumbent governor Pat McCrory by about 0.2 points. Cooper was re-elected in 2020 by 4.5 percentage points.

The Democratic nominee was Josh Stein, the incumbent state attorney general. The Republican nominee was Mark Robinson, the incumbent lieutenant governor.

The 2024 election was initially expected to be competitive due to the state's nearly even to slightly right-leaning partisan lean, the concurrent presidential election, and the seat being open due to term limits. However, Robinson later became embroiled in numerous controversies after becoming the nominee, allowing Stein to open up a large and consistent lead in polls. Stein won 37 counties and Robinson won 63. Of the three gubernatorial races that went blue in 2024, North Carolina went bluest in its overall margin, even though the other two were significantly more Democratic states.

== Democratic primary ==
=== Candidates ===
==== Nominee ====
- Josh Stein, North Carolina Attorney General (2017–2025)

==== Eliminated in primary ====
- Chrelle Booker, Tryon city councilor (2019–present) and candidate for U.S. Senate in 2022
- Gary Foxx, former Princeville police chief
- Michael R. Morgan, former North Carolina Supreme Court justice (2016–2023)
- Marcus Williams, attorney and perennial candidate

==== Declined ====
- Sydney Batch, state senator from the 17th district (2021–present) (endorsed Stein)
- Jeff Jackson, U.S. Representative from North Carolina's 14th congressional district (2023–2024) (endorsed Stein, ran for Attorney General)
- Natalie Murdock, state senator from the 20th district (2020–present) (endorsed Stein)
- Robert T. Reives II, Minority Leader of the North Carolina House of Representatives (2021–present) from the 54th district (2014–present) (endorsed Stein)

=== Endorsements ===
Josh Stein

U.S. representatives

- G. K. Butterfield, former U.S. representative from North Carolina's 1st congressional district (2004–2022)
- Eva Clayton, former U.S. representative from North Carolina's 1st congressional district (1992–2003)
- Valerie Foushee, U.S. representative from North Carolina's 4th congressional district (2023–present)
- Jeff Jackson, U.S. representative from North Carolina's 14th congressional district (2023–2025), Democratic nominee for Attorney General in 2024
- Kathy Manning, U.S. representative from North Carolina's 6th congressional district (2021–2025)
- Wiley Nickel, U.S. representative from North Carolina's 13th congressional district (2023–2025)
- Deborah Ross, U.S. representative from North Carolina's 2nd congressional district (2021–present)

Statewide officials

- Roy Cooper, Governor of North Carolina (2017–2025)
- Jim Hunt, former Governor of North Carolina (1977–1985, 1993–2001)
- Burley Mitchell, former Chief Justice of the North Carolina Supreme Court (1995–1999)

State legislators

- Robert Reives, minority leader of the North Carolina House of Representatives (2021–present from the 54th district (2014–present)

Individuals

- Cristina Tzintzún Ramirez, president of NextGen America PAC (2021–present)

Labor unions

- North Carolina AFL-CIO
- North Carolina Association of Educators

Organizations

- End Citizens United
- NextGen America PAC
- North Carolina League of Conservation Voters
- Reproductive Freedom for All
- Sierra Club

Newspapers

- The Charlotte Observer (Democratic primary only)

=== Polling ===
Poll source	Date(s) administered	Sample size (Note: Key: A – all adults RV – registered voters LV – likely voters V – unclear)	Margin of error	Chrelle Booker	Gary Foxx	Michael Morgan	Josh Stein	Marcus Williams	Other	Undecided
High Point University	February 16–23, 2024	322 (LV)	± 6.0%	10%	10%	14%	57%	9%	–	–
Change Research (D) (Note: Poll sponsored by Carolina Forward)	February 15–19, 2024	1,622 (LV)	± 2.6%	–	–	8%	49%	–	4% (Note: "Would not vote" with 4%)	39%
East Carolina University	February 9–12, 2024	1,207 (RV)	± 3.3%	2%	2%	7%	57%	3%	–	29%
Meredith College	January 26–31, 2024	760 (RV)	± 3.5%	5%	3%	4%	31%	2%	4% (Note: "Someone else" with 4%)	51%
Public Policy Polling (D)	December 15–16, 2023	556 (LV)	± 4.2%	3%	1%	5%	56%	4%	–	32%
	December 15, 2023	Foxx joins the race								
	December 14, 2023	Williams joins the race								
	November 2, 2023	Booker joins the race								
Meredith College	November 1–5, 2023	755 (RV)	± 3.5%	–	–	11%	38%	–	7% (Note: "Someone else" with 7%)	44%
Meredith College	September 16–19, 2023	308 (RV)	± 3.5%	–	–	11%	33%	–	10% (Note: "Someone else" with 10%)	46%

Hypothetical polling

Poll source	Date(s) administered	Sample size	Margin of error	Mandy Cohen	Jeff Jackson	Josh Stein	Other	Undecided
Public Policy Polling (D)	October 7–8, 2022	606 (RV)	± 4.0%	18%	12%	22%	9% (Note: "Someone else" with 9%)	39%

=== Results ===
Results by county: Stein: Stein—80–90%; Stein—70–80%; Stein—60–70%; Stein—50–60%; Stein—40–50%; Stein—30–40%; Morgan: Morgan—50–60%; Morgan—40–50%

Democratic primary results
Party	Candidate	Votes	%
Democratic	Josh Stein	479,026	69.60%
Democratic	Michael R. Morgan	98,627	14.33%
Democratic	Chrelle Booker	46,045	6.69%
Democratic	Marcus Williams	39,257	5.70%
Democratic	Gary Foxx	25,283	3.67%
Total votes		688,238	100.0%

== Republican primary ==
=== Candidates ===
==== Nominee ====
- Mark Robinson, Lieutenant Governor of North Carolina (2021–2025)

==== Eliminated in primary ====
- Dale Folwell, North Carolina State Treasurer (2017–2025)
- Bill Graham, attorney and candidate for governor in 2008

==== Withdrawn ====
- Jesse Thomas, retired healthcare executive (ran for Secretary of State)
- Mark Walker, former U.S. Representative from North Carolina's 6th congressional district (2015–2021) and candidate for U.S. Senate in 2022 (ran for U.S. House)
- Andy Wells, former state senator and candidate for lieutenant governor in 2020

==== Declined ====
- Thom Tillis, U.S. Senator from North Carolina (2015–present) (endorsed Graham)

=== Endorsements ===
Dale Folwell

Council of State officials

- James G. Martin, former Governor of North Carolina (1985–1993)

Newspapers

- The Charlotte Observer (Republican primary only)
Bill Graham

U.S. senators

- Thom Tillis, U.S. senator from North Carolina (2015–present)
Mark Robinson

Executive branch officials

- Donald Trump, President of the United States (2017–2021)

U.S. senators

- Ted Budd, U.S. senator from North Carolina (2023–present)

U.S. representatives

- Dan Bishop, U.S. representative from North Carolina's 8th congressional district (2019–2025), Republican nominee for Attorney General in 2024

State senators

- Phil Berger, President pro tempore of the North Carolina Senate (2011–present) from the 26th district (2001–present)
- Danny Britt, state senator from the 24th district (2017–present)

State representatives

- Neal Jackson, state representative from the 78th district (2023–present)
- Charlie Miller, state representative from the 19th district (2021–present)

Organizations

- National Rifle Association Political Victory Fund
- Conservative Political Action Committee

Newspapers

- Rhino Times

=== Debate ===
2024 North Carolina gubernatorial election Republican primary debate
No.	Date	Host	Moderator	Link	Republican	Republican	Republican
Key: P Participant A Absent N Not invited I Invited W Withdrawn							
Key: P Participant A Absent N Not invited I Invited W Withdrawn					Dale Folwell	Mark Walker	Jesse Thomas
1	September 12, 2023	Wake County; Republican Party	Bill LuMaye	YouTube	P	P	P

=== Polling ===
Poll source	Date(s) administered	Sample size	Margin of error	Dale Folwell	Bill Graham	Mark Robinson	Jesse Thomas	Mark Walker	Andy Wells	Other	Undecided
High Point University	February 16–23, 2024	394 (LV)	± 6.0%	17%	33%	51%	9%	–	–	–	–
Capen Analytics (R)	February 21, 2024	12,580 (LV)	± 5.0%	29%	18%	53%	–	–	–	–	–
Change Research (D)	February 15–19, 2024	1,622 (LV)	± 2.6%	9%	9%	57%	–	–	–	3% (Note: "Would not vote" with 3%)	22%
East Carolina University	February 9–12, 2024	1,207 (RV)	± 3.3%	7%	13%	53%	–	–	–	–	27%
Meredith College	January 26–31, 2024	760 (RV)	± 3.5%	4%	9%	34%	–	–	–	10%	42%
Public Policy Polling (D)	January 5–6, 2024	619 (LV)	± 3.9%	7%	15%	55%	–	–	–	–	24%
	December 16, 2023	Wells withdraws from the race									
East Carolina University	November 29 – December 1, 2023	445 (LV)	± 5.4%	7%	8%	34%	–	–	3%	–	49%
	November 2, 2023	Thomas withdraws from the race									
Meredith College	November 1–5, 2023	755 (RV)	± 3.5%	3%	5%	41%	2%	–	1%	6% (Note: "Someone else" with 6%)	42%
	October 25, 2023	Walker withdraws from the race									
	October 18, 2023	Graham joins the race									
Cygnal (R) (Note: Poll sponsored by the John Locke Foundation)	October 8–9, 2023	600 (LV)	± 3.9%	5%	–	49%	1%	4%	1%	–	41%
Meredith College	September 16–19, 2023	350 (RV)	± 3.5%	3%	–	34%	3%	7%	3%	6%	44%

Hypothetical polling

Poll source	Date(s) administered	Sample size	Margin of error	Dale Folwell	Pat McCrory	Mark Robinson	Thom Tillis	Steve Troxler	Mark Walker	Other	Undecided
Opinion Diagnostics (R)	June 5–7, 2023	902 (LV)	± 3.3%	4%	–	44%	–	–	7%	7%	38%
SurveyUSA	April 25–29, 2023	707 (LV)	± 4.4%	4%	–	43%	–	9%	8%	–	37%
Differentiators (R)	December 12, 2022	500 (LV)	± 4.0%	6%	–	60%	–	–	–	–	34%
Differentiators (R)	December 12, 2022	500 (LV)	± 4.0%	–	21%	60%	–	–	–	–	19%
Differentiators (R)	December 12, 2022	500 (LV)	± 4.0%	–	–	58%	–	–	8%	–	34%
Public Policy Polling (D)	October 7–8, 2022	606 (RV)	± 4.0%	4%	–	54%	20%	–	–	5% (Note: "Someone else" with 5%)	17%

=== Results ===
Results by county: Robinson: Robinson—80–90%; Robinson—70–80%; Robinson—60–70%; Robinson—50–60%; Robinson—40–50%

Republican primary results
Party	Candidate	Votes	%
Republican	Mark Robinson	666,504	64.83%
Republican	Dale Folwell	196,955	19.16%
Republican	Bill Graham	164,572	16.01%
Total votes		1,028,031	100.0%

== Other candidates ==
=== Libertarian Party ===
==== Nominee ====
- Mike Ross, treasurer of the North Carolina Libertarian Party

==== Eliminated in primary ====
- Shannon Bray, cybersecurity professional and nominee for U.S. Senate in 2020 and 2022

==== Results ====
Results by county: Ross: Ross—100%; Ross—80–90%; Ross—70–80%; Ross—60–70%; Ross—50–60%; Bray: Bray—100%; Bray—70–80%; Bray—60–70%; Bray—50–60%; Tie: Tie—50%

Libertarian primary results
Party	Candidate	Votes	%
Libertarian	Mike Ross	2,910	59.45%
Libertarian	Shannon Bray	1,985	40.55%
Total votes		4,895	100.0%

=== Green Party ===
==== Nominee ====
- Wayne Turner, co-chair of the North Carolina Green Party

=== Constitution Party ===
==== Nominee ====
- Vinny Smith, treasurer of the North Carolina Constitution Party

== General election ==
=== Campaign ===
Stein and Robinson faced each other in the general election. With the backing of former President Donald Trump, Robinson received heavy criticism from Democrats over statements on abortion rights, LGBTQ rights, and education. Robinson had also made a series of controversial statements before and after taking public office, including engaging in Holocaust denial. Robinson also received criticism from some Republicans considered to be moderate, including Senator Thom Tillis and primary opponent Dale Folwell, both of whom declined to endorse Robinson. On September 17, Stein refused any potential debates with Robinson following a challenge from him.

==== Calls for Robinson to drop out ====
On September 19, CNN released a story detailing racist, antisemitic, misogynistic, and other "disturbing comments" made by an account suspected to be Robinson on a pornography website between 2008 and 2012. Hours later, CNN specified multiple comments made on pornography website message boards, including Robinson calling himself a "black NAZI" and expressing support for reinstating slavery. The Carolina Journal had reported that earlier in the week the Trump–Vance campaign privately told Robinson that he was not welcome at rallies for Donald Trump or JD Vance. This occurred on the same day as the filing deadline for North Carolina's 2024 election ballots. Before the story was released, Robinson released a video dismissing the report as "tabloid lies" and saying that he would not drop out of the race. His campaign canceled events in Henderson and Norlina planned for the same day. Republican state senate nominee Scott Lassiter was the first on the ballot with Robinson to call for him to "step aside". Republican North Carolina senator Ted Budd said, "the allegations are concerning but we don't have any facts". That afternoon, Politico reported that an email address belonging to Robinson was registered on Ashley Madison, a website designed for people seeking affairs while married. The deadline for Robinson to withdraw from the race or be removed from the ballot passed on the morning of September 20.

Following CNN's September report, most forecasters moved the race to 'Likely Democratic', while Elections Daily moved the race to Safe Democratic.

=== Predictions ===
Source	Ranking	As of
The Cook Political Report	Likely D	September 20, 2024
Inside Elections	Likely D	September 26, 2024
Sabato's Crystal Ball	Likely D	September 19, 2024
RCP	Likely D	September 28, 2024
Fox News	Likely D	September 25, 2024
Elections Daily	Safe D	September 19, 2024
CNalysis	Solid D	October 15, 2024
Split Ticket	Safe D	October 19, 2024

=== Post-primary endorsements ===
Josh Stein (D)

U.S. executive branch officials

- Kamala Harris, Vice President of the United States (2021–2025)

U.S. representatives

- Gabby Giffords, U.S. representative from Arizona's 8th congressional district (2007–2012)

Statewide officials

- Andy Beshear, Governor of Kentucky (2019–present)
- Wes Moore, Governor of Maryland (2023–present)
- Josh Shapiro, Governor of Pennsylvania (2023–present)

State senators

- Jim Davis, former state senator from the 50th district (2011–2021) (Republican)
- Richard Stevens, former state senator from the 17th district (2007–2012) (Republican)

State representatives

- Chuck McGrady, former state representative from the 117th district (2011–2020) (Republican)
- Charles Neely, former state representative from the 61st district (1995–1999) (Republican)
- Garland Pierce, state representative from the 48th district (2005–present)

Organizations

- Giffords
- Human Rights Campaign
- Jewish Democratic Council of America

Individuals

- Martin Luther King III, activist
Mark Robinson (R)

Statewide officials

- ~~Brian Kemp, Governor of Georgia (2019–present)~~
- ~~Bill Lee, Governor of Tennessee (2019–present)~~
- ~~Henry McMaster, Governor of South Carolina (2017–present)~~
- ~~Glenn Youngkin, Governor of Virginia (2022–present)~~

Organizations

- Republicans for National Renewal
- ~~Republican Governors Association~~
Declined to endorse

Statewide officials

- Dale Folwell, North Carolina State Treasurer (2017–2025) (Republican)
- Pat McCrory, former Governor of North Carolina (2013–2017) (Republican)

U.S. senators

- Thom Tillis, U.S. Senator from North Carolina (2015–present) (Republican)

=== Fundraising ===
Campaign finance reports as of December 31, 2024
Candidate	Raised	Spent	Cash on hand
Josh Stein (D)	$84,064,178	$82,450,647	$1,901,820
Mark Robinson (R)	$20,012,299	$19,799,956	$250,001
Source: North Carolina State Board of Elections

=== Polling ===
Aggregate polls

Source of poll aggregation	Dates administered	Dates updated	Josh Stein (D)	Mark Robinson (R)	Undecided (Note: Calculated by taking the difference of 100% and all other candidates combined.)	Margin
RealClearPolitics	October 16 – November 4, 2024	November 4, 2024	53.1%	38.8%	8.1%	Stein +14.3%
270ToWin	October 24 – November 4, 2024	November 4, 2024	53.1%	38.0%	8.9%	Stein +15.1%
The Hill/DDHQ	through November 4, 2024	November 4, 2024	53.4%	38.8%	7.8%	Stein +14.6%
Average			53.2%	38.5%	8.2%	Stein +14.7%

Poll source	Date(s) administered	Sample size	Margin of error	Josh Stein (D)	Mark Robinson (R)	Other	Undecided
AtlasIntel	November 3–4, 2024	1,219 (LV)	± 3.0%	54%	38%	4% (Note: "Other" with 2%; "Blank/Null/Won't vote" with 2%)	4%
AtlasIntel	November 1–2, 2024	1,310 (LV)	± 3.0%	52%	41%	4%	3%
Emerson College (Note: Poll sponsored by Nexstar)	October 30 – November 2, 2024	860 (LV)	± 3.3%	52%	40%	4%	4%
New York Times/Siena College	October 28 – November 2, 2024	1,010 (LV)	± 3.6%	56%	38%	–	5%
New York Times/Siena College	October 28 – November 2, 2024	1,010 (RV)	± 3.6%	56%	36%	–	7%
Morning Consult	October 23 – November 1, 2024	1,056 (LV)	± 3.0%	52%	36%	–	12%
ActiVote	October 17–31, 2024	400 (LV)	± 4.9%	58%	42%	–	–
AtlasIntel	October 27–30, 2024	1,373 (LV)	± 3.0%	52%	42%	4%	2%
AtlasIntel	October 25–29, 2024	1,665 (LV)	± 3.0%	54%	39%	4%	4%
East Carolina University	October 24–29, 2024	1,250 (LV)	± 3.0%	55%	40%	5% (Note: Ross (L) with 3%)	–
Fox News	October 24–28, 2024	872 (LV)	± 3.0%	57%	41%	–	2%
Fox News	October 24–28, 2024	1,113 (RV)	± 3.0%	59%	38%	1%	2%
CNN/SSRS	October 23–28, 2024	750 (LV)	± 4.5%	53%	37%	10% (Note: "Neither" with 6%; "Other" with 3%)	1%
SurveyUSA (Note: Poll sponsored by WRAL-TV)	October 23–26, 2024	853 (LV)	± 4.1%	52%	37%	1%	10%
UMass Lowell/YouGov	October 16–23, 2024	650 (LV)	± 4.2%	48%	36%	3% (Note: Ross (L) with 2%; Smith (C) with 1%)	12%
Emerson College	October 21–22, 2024	950 (LV)	± 3.1%	51%	39%	4%	6%
Marist College	October 17–22, 2024	1,226 (LV)	± 3.6%	55%	41%	3% (Note: "Another party's candidate" with 3%)	2%
Marist College	October 17–22, 2024	1,410 (RV)	± 3.3%	55%	40%	3%	2%
SoCal Strategies (R) (Note: Poll sponsored by On Point Politics and Red Eagle Politics, which supports Republican candidates.)	October 20–21, 2024	702 (LV)	± 3.7%	55%	40%	–	5%
SurveyUSA (Note: Poll sponsored by High Point University)	October 17–20, 2024	1,164 (RV)	± 3.7%	50%	34%	–	15%
Redfield & Wilton Strategies (Note: Poll sponsored by The Daily Telegraph)	October 16–18, 2024	843 (LV)	± 3.1%	45%	37%	6% (Note: "Won't vote if these are the candidates" with 3%; Ross (L) with 2%; "Other" with 1%)	10%
AtlasIntel	October 12–17, 2024	1,674 (LV)	± 2.0%	54%	39%	3% (Note: "Other" with 2%; "Blank/Null/Won't vote" with 1%)	4%
Elon University/YouGov	October 10–17, 2024	800 (RV)	± 4.0%	52%	31%	7% (Note: "Other" with 4%; "None" with 3%)	10%
Morning Consult	October 6–15, 2024	1,072 (LV)	± 3.0%	54%	32%	4%	10%
Cygnal (R) (Note: Poll sponsored by the Carolina Journal)	October 12–14, 2024	600 (LV)	± 4.0%	49%	36%	4% (Note: Ross (L) with 3%; Turner (G) with 1%; Smith (C) with <1%)	11%
Redfield & Wilton Strategies	October 12–14, 2024	620 (LV)	± 3.6%	45%	38%	8% (Note: "Won't vote if these are the candidates" with 4%; Ross (L) with 2%; Turner (G) with 1%; "Other" with 1%)	9%
Quinnipiac University	October 10–14, 2024	1,031 (LV)	± 3.1%	54%	42%	2% (Note: "Refused" with 2%)	2%
Quinnipiac University	October 10–14, 2024	1,031 (LV)	± 3.1%	52%	40%	5% (Note: Ross (L) with 2%; Turner (G) and Smith (C) with 1%; "Refused" with 1%)	2%
Emerson College (Note: Poll sponsored by The Hill)	October 5–8, 2024	1,000 (LV)	± 3.0%	50%	34%	5%	11%
ActiVote	September 5 – October 5, 2024	400 (LV)	± 4.9%	56.5%	43.5%	–	–
Redfield & Wilton Strategies	September 27 – October 2, 2024	753 (LV)	± 3.3%	46%	36%	4% (Note: Ross (L) with 2%; Turner (G) with 1%; "Other" with 1%)	14%
Quinnipiac University	September 25–29, 2024	953 (LV)	± 3.2%	53%	41%	2% (Note: "Wouldn't Vote" and "Refused" with 1%)	4%
Quinnipiac University	September 25–29, 2024	953 (LV)	± 3.2%	52%	39%	6% (Note: Ross (L) with 3%, Smith (C), "Wouldn't Vote", and "Refused" with 1%)	3%
The Washington Post	September 25–29, 2024	1,001 (LV)	± 3.5%	54%	38%	2% (Note: "Wouldn't vote" with 2%)	6%
The Washington Post	September 25–29, 2024	1,001 (RV)	± 3.5%	53%	38%	2%	7%
High Point University	September 20–29, 2024	589 (LV)	± 4.0%	51%	34%	3%	11%
High Point University	September 20–29, 2024	814 (RV)	± 3.4%	51%	32%	3%	14%
Emerson College (Note: Poll sponsored by RealClearWorld)	September 27–28, 2024	850 (LV)	± 3.3%	52%	33%	4%	12%
RMG Research (Note: Poll sponsored by Napolitan Institute)	September 25–27, 2024	780 (LV)	± 3.5%	53% (Note: With voters who lean towards a given candidate)	38%	1% (Note: "Would not vote" with 1%)	8%
RMG Research	September 25–27, 2024	780 (LV)	± 3.5%	50%	36%	5% (Note: "Some other candidate" with 4%; "Would not vote" with 1%)	9%
East Carolina University	September 23–26, 2024	1,005 (LV)	± 3.0%	50%	33%	5% (Note: Ross (L) with 3%; Smith (C), "Other" with 1%)	13%
AtlasIntel	September 20–25, 2024	1,173 (LV)	± 3.0%	54%	38%	3% (Note: "Blank/Null/Won't vote" with 2%; "Other" with 1%)	5%
CNN/SSRS	September 20–25, 2024	931 (LV)	± 3.9%	53%	36%	11% (Note: "Neither" with 8%; "Other" with 3%)	–
BSG (R)/Global Strategy Group (D) (Note: Poll sponsored by The Cook Political Report)	September 19–25, 2024	411 (LV)	–	53%	33%	7% (Note: "Someone else" with 3%; "Would not vote" with 4%)	8%
BSG (R)/Global Strategy Group (D)	September 19–25, 2024	411 (LV)	–	59%	35%	–	6%
Fox News	September 20–24, 2024	787 (LV)	± 3.5%	56%	41%	1% (Note: "Wouldn't vote" with 1%)	3%
Fox News	September 20–24, 2024	991 (RV)	± 3.0%	56%	40%	2% (Note: "Other" with 1% and "Wouldn't vote" with 1%)	3%
Marist College	September 19–24, 2024	1,507 (RV)	± 3.5%	54%	42%	1% (Note: "Another party's candidate" with 1%)	3%
Marist College	September 19–24, 2024	1,348 (LV)	± 3.7%	54%	43%	1%	2%
September 19, 2024	CNN Reports that Mark Robinson made disturbing comments on an online forum years ago.						
New York Times/Siena College	September 17–21, 2024	682 (LV)	± 4.2%	47%	37%	–	16%
New York Times/Siena College	September 17–21, 2024	682 (RV)	± 4.2%	47%	36%	–	17%
Meredith College	September 18–20, 2024	802 (LV)	± 3.5%	50%	40%	5% (Note: Ross (L) with 2%; Turner (G), Smith (C), and "Someone else" with 1%)	9%
Victory Insights (R)	September 16–18, 2024	600 (LV)	± 4.0%	47%	42%	–	11%
Emerson College	September 15–18, 2024	1,000 (RV)	± 3.0%	48%	40%	2% (Note: "Someone else" with 2%)	10%
Morning Consult	September 11–18, 2024	1,314 (LV)	± 2.7%	50%	37%	1%	12%
Fabrizio Ward (R)/Impact Research (D) (Note: Poll sponsored by AARP)	September 11–17, 2024	600 (LV)	± 4.0%	52%	42%	–	6%
Cygnal (R)	September 15–16, 2024	600 (LV)	± 4.0%	46%	39%	2% (Note: Ross (L) with 2%)	13%
Elon University/YouGov	September 4–13, 2024	800 (RV)	± 3.74%	49%	35%	3%	9%
Redfield & Wilton Strategies	September 6–9, 2024	495 (LV)	± 3.8%	42%	33%	3% (Note: Ross (L) with 1%; "Other" with 2%)	23%
Quinnipiac University	September 4–8, 2024	940 (LV)	± 3.2%	51%	41%	5% (Note: Ross (L) with 2%; Turner (G) with 1%; Smith (C) with 1%; "Refused" with 1%)	4%
Morning Consult	August 30 – September 8, 2024	1,369 (LV)	± 3.0%	50%	37%	2%	11%
SurveyUSA	September 4–7, 2024	676 (LV)	± 4.9%	51%	37%	–	12%
Florida Atlantic University/ Mainstreet Research	September 5–6, 2024	692 (RV)	± 3.7%	48%	38%	–	14%
Florida Atlantic University/ Mainstreet Research	September 5–6, 2024	619 (LV)	± 3.7%	50%	39%	–	11%
East Carolina University	August 26–28, 2024	920 (LV)	± 3.0%	47%	41%	1% (Note: Ross (L) with 1%; Turner (G), Smith (C), "Write-in candidate" each with <1%)	11%
Emerson College	August 25–28, 2024	775 (LV)	± 3.5%	47%	41%	3% (Note: "Someone else" with 3%)	10%
Redfield & Wilton Strategies	August 25–28, 2024	812 (LV)	± 3.18%	44%	40%	4% (Note: Ross (L) with 2%; Turner (G) with 1%; "Others" with 1%)	13%
SoCal Strategies (R)	August 26–27, 2024	612 (LV)	–	47%	37%	–	16%
Fox News	August 23–26, 2024	1,026 (RV)	± 3.0%	54%	43%	2%	1%
ActiVote	July 26 – August 26, 2024	400 (LV)	± 4.9%	54%	46%	–	–
SurveyUSA	August 19–21, 2024	1,053 (RV)	± 4.0%	48%	34%	–	18%
SurveyUSA	August 19–21, 2024	941 (LV)	± 4.0%	50%	36%	–	14%
Redfield & Wilton Strategies	August 12–15, 2024	601 (LV)	± 3.7%	45%	39%	3% (Note: Ross (L) with 2%; "Other" with 1%)	13%
The New York Times/Siena College	August 9–14, 2024	655 (RV)	± 4.2%	48%	38%	–	14%
The New York Times/Siena College	August 9–14, 2024	655 (LV)	± 4.2%	49%	39%	–	12%
YouGov Blue (D)	August 5–9, 2024	802 (RV)	± 3.9%	46%	36%	6% (Note: Ross (L) with 1%; Turner (G) with 1%; "Undecided Third Party" with 4%)	13%
Cygnal (R)	August 4–5, 2024	600 (LV)	± 4.0%	43%	38%	4% (Note: Ross (L) with 3%; Turner (G) with 1%)	15%
Redfield & Wilton Strategies	July 31 – August 3, 2024	714 (LV)	–	43%	38%	3% (Note: Ross (L) with 1%; Turner (G) with 1%; "Other" with 1%)	16%
Redfield & Wilton Strategies	July 22–24, 2024	586 (LV)	–	38%	34%	5% (Note: Ross (L) with 3%; Turner (G) with 1%; "Other" with 1%)	23%
July 21, 2024	Joe Biden withdraws from the presidential race						
Public Policy Polling (D) (Note: Poll sponsored by Clean and Prosperous America PAC, which supports Democratic candidates)	July 19–20, 2024	573 (RV)	–	48%	42%	–	10%
Redfield & Wilton Strategies	July 16–18, 2024	461 (LV)	± 4.0%	37%	36%	4% (Note: Ross (L) with 1%; Turner (G) with 1%; "Other" with 2%)	23%
Expedition Strategies (Note: Poll Sponsored by Progressive Policy Institute)	June 24 – July 8, 2024	284 (LV)	–	48%	41%	–	11%
Spry Strategies (R)	June 7–11, 2024	600 (LV)	± 4.0%	39%	43%	–	18%
East Carolina University	May 31 – June 3, 2024	1,332 (LV)	± 3.1%	44%	43%	–	13%
North Star Opinion Research (R) (Note: Poll sponsored by American Greatness)	May 29 – June 2, 2024	600 (LV)	± 4.0%	42%	44%	–	14%
Change Research (D)	May 13–18, 2024	835 (LV)	± 3.8%	44%	43%	–	13%
High Point University	May 2–9, 2024	804 (RV)	± 3.2%	34%	39%	–	27%
High Point University	May 2–9, 2024	1,002 (A)	± 3.2%	30%	35%	–	35%
Cygnal (R)	May 4–5, 2024	600 (LV)	± 4.0%	39%	39%	5% (Note: Ross (L) with 4%; Turner (G) with 1%)	17%
Emerson College	April 25–29, 2024	1,000 (RV)	± 3.0%	41%	42%	5%	12%
Meeting Street Insights (R) (Note: Poll sponsored by Carolina Partnership for Reform & Carolina Leadership Coalition)	April 25–28, 2024	500 (RV)	± 4.4%	44%	37%	6% (Note: Ross (L) with 4%; Turner (G) with 2%)	13%
Meredith College	April 11–17, 2024	711 (LV)	± 3.5%	45%	36%	–	20%
Cygnal (R)	April 7–8, 2024	600 (LV)	± 4.0%	38%	40%	–	18%
Quinnipiac University	April 4–8, 2024	1,401 (RV)	± 2.6%	52%	44%	2%	3%
Quinnipiac University	April 4–8, 2024	1,401 (RV)	± 2.6%	48%	41%	7% (Note: Ross (L) with 4%; Turner (G) with 2%; "Wouldn't vote" with 1%)	3%
High Point University	March 22–30, 2024	829 (RV)	± 3.4%	37%	34%	–	29%
Marist College	March 11–14, 2024	1,197 (RV)	± 3.6%	49%	47%	–	4%
SurveyUSA	March 3–9, 2024	598 (LV)	± 4.9%	44%	42%	–	14%
Cygnal (R)	March 6–7, 2024	600 (LV)	± 4.0%	39%	44%	–	17%
Change Research (D)	February 15–19, 2024	1,622 (LV)	± 2.6%	42%	43%	–	15%
East Carolina University	February 9–12, 2024	1,207 (RV)	± 3.3%	41%	41%	–	14%
Meredith College	January 26–31, 2024	760 (RV)	± 3.5%	39%	35%	–	17%
East Carolina University	November 29 – December 1, 2023	915 (RV)	± 3.8%	40%	44%	–	16%
Meredith College	November 1–5, 2023	755 (RV)	± 3.5%	38%	36%	–	19%
Change Research (D)	September 1–5, 2023	914 (LV)	± 3.6%	38%	42%	–	20%
Opinion Diagnostics (R)	June 5–7, 2023	902 (LV)	± 3.3%	38%	41%	–	21%
Cygnal (R)	May 12–23, 2023	610 (LV)	± 4.0%	41%	42%	–	18%
Change Research (D)	May 5–8, 2023	802 (LV)	± 3.9%	43%	46%	1%	10%
Public Policy Polling (D)	March 2–3, 2023	704 (RV)	± 3.7%	42%	44%	–	14%
Differentiator Data (R) (Note: Poll sponsored by the NC Values Commission)	January 9–12, 2023	500 (LV)	± 4.5%	42%	42%	–	16%
Public Policy Polling (D)	October 7–8, 2022	606 (RV)	± 4.0%	44%	42%	–	14%
Meeting Street Insights (R) (Note: Poll sponsored by the Carolina Partnership for Reform)	May 12–16, 2022	500 (LV)	± 4.4%	42%	48%	–	10%

Hypothetical polling

Josh Stein vs. Dale Folwell

Poll source	Date(s) administered	Sample size	Margin of error	Josh Stein (D)	Dale Folwell (R)	Undecided
East Carolina University	February 9–12, 2024	1,207 (RV)	± 3.3%	42%	31%	27%
East Carolina University	November 29 – December 1, 2023	915 (RV)	± 3.8%	40%	38%	22%
Cygnal (R)	May 12–23, 2023	610 (LV)	± 4.0%	39%	34%	27%

Josh Stein vs. Bill Graham

Poll source	Date(s) administered	Sample size	Margin of error	Josh Stein (D)	Bill Graham (R)	Undecided
East Carolina University	February 9–12, 2024	1,207 (RV)	± 3.3%	40%	35%	25%
East Carolina University	November 29 – December 1, 2023	915 (RV)	± 3.8%	42%	39%	19%

Josh Stein vs. Mark Walker

Poll source	Date(s) administered	Sample size	Margin of error	Josh Stein (D)	Mark Walker (R)	Undecided
Cygnal (R)	May 12–23, 2023	610 (LV)	± 4.0%	39%	37%	24%

Generic Democrat vs. generic Republican

Poll source	Date(s) administered	Sample size	Margin of error	Generic Democrat	Generic Republican	Other	Undecided
High Point University	February 16–23, 2024	753 (LV)	± 3.9%	46%	45%	2% (Note: "Another party's candidate" with 2%)	7%

== Results ==
2024 North Carolina gubernatorial election
Party	Candidate	Votes	%	±%
Democratic	Josh Stein	3,069,496	54.90%	+3.38%
Republican	Mark Robinson	2,241,309	40.08%	–6.93%
Libertarian	Mike Ross	176,392	3.15%	+2.05%
Constitution	Vinny Smith	54,738	0.98%	+0.60%
Green	Wayne Turner	49,612	0.89%	N/A
Total votes		5,591,547	100.0%	
Democratic hold				

=== By county ===
County	Josh Stein Democratic		Mark Robinson Republican		Various candidates Other parties		Margin		Total
County	#	%	#	%	#	%	#	%	Total
Alamance	47,118	53.33%	36,979	41.86%	4,248	4.81%	10,139	11.47%	88,345
Alexander	5,435	26.71%	13,930	68.46%	982	4.83%	-8,495	-41.75%	20,347
Alleghany	2,193	34.66%	3,830	60.53%	304	4.81%	-1,637	-25.87%	6,327
Anson	5,708	53.05%	4,681	43.51%	370	3.44%	1,027	9.54%	10,759
Ashe	5,646	35.78%	9,359	59.31%	774	4.91%	-3,713	-23.53%	15,779
Avery	2,715	29.42%	6,123	66.36%	389	4.22%	-3,408	-36.94%	9,227
Beaufort	10,871	41.73%	14,044	53.91%	1,136	4.36%	-3,173	-12.18%	26,051
Bertie	5,436	60.21%	3,382	37.46%	211	2.33%	2,054	22.75%	9,029
Bladen	7,460	45.19%	8,446	51.17%	601	3.64%	-986	-5.98%	16,507
Brunswick	51,335	48.12%	48,250	45.23%	7,100	6.65%	3,085	2.89%	106,685
Buncombe	106,611	67.62%	44,373	28.15%	6,671	4.23%	62,238	39.47%	157,655
Burke	16,274	36.14%	26,602	59.08%	2,153	4.78%	-10,328	-22.94%	45,029
Cabarrus	61,562	52.29%	49,500	42.04%	6,674	5.67%	12,062	10.25%	117,736
Caldwell	12,932	30.26%	27,563	64.50%	2,241	5.24%	-14,631	-34.24%	42,736
Camden	1,597	25.74%	4,365	70.62%	219	3.64%	-2,768	-44.88%	6,181
Carteret	16,808	37.61%	25,069	56.10%	2,811	6.29%	-8,261	-18.49%	44,688
Caswell	5,100	43.13%	6,279	53.10%	446	3.77%	-1,179	-9.97%	11,825
Catawba	32,574	38.04%	48,704	56.88%	4,345	5.08%	-16,130	-18.84%	85,623
Chatham	32,244	62.81%	16,888	32.90%	2,204	4.29%	15,356	29.91%	51,336
Cherokee	4,089	23.25%	12,884	73.25%	615	3.50%	-8,795	-50.00%	17,588
Chowan	3,144	42.24%	4,086	54.90%	213	2.86%	-942	-12.66%	7,443
Clay	2,070	27.25%	5,281	69.51%	246	3.24%	-3,211	-42.26%	7,597
Cleveland	19,733	39.05%	28,350	56.11%	2,446	4.84%	-8,617	-17.06%	50,529
Columbus	9,920	38.40%	14,970	57.95%	941	3.65%	-5,050	-19.55%	25,381
Craven	25,705	46.75%	26,307	47.85%	2,970	5.40%	-602	-1.10%	54,982
Cumberland	83,637	60.65%	47,014	34.09%	7,259	5.26%	36,623	26.56%	137,910
Currituck	4,836	27.25%	12,153	68.49%	756	4.26%	-7,317	-41.24%	17,745
Dare	11,031	44.52%	12,717	51.33%	1,029	4.15%	-1,686	-6.81%	24,504
Davidson	32,421	35.22%	54,241	58.92%	5,389	5.86%	-21,820	-23.70%	92,051
Davie	9,373	35.54%	15,393	58.37%	1,607	6.09%	-6,020	-22.83%	26,373
Duplin	8,905	39.76%	12,634	56.41%	859	3.83%	-3,729	-16.65%	22,398
Durham	150,555	84.03%	22,541	12.58%	6,071	3.39%	128,014	71.45%	179,167
Edgecombe	15,715	65.28%	7,675	31.88%	685	2.84%	8,040	33.40%	24,075
Forsyth	127,551	63.74%	62,320	31.14%	10,235	5.12%	65,231	32.60%	200,106
Franklin	21,001	49.91%	18,958	45.06%	2,118	5.03%	2,043	4.85%	42,077
Gaston	51,428	44.15%	58,194	49.96%	6,865	5.89%	-6,766	-5.81%	116,487
Gates	2,334	40.55%	3,252	56.50%	170	2.95%	-918	-15.95%	5,756
Graham	1,143	24.56%	3,321	71.37%	189	4.07%	-2,178	-46.81%	4,653
Granville	16,296	51.58%	13,886	43.95%	1,414	4.47%	2,410	7.63%	31,596
Greene	3,839	46.20%	4,229	50.89%	242	2.91%	-390	-4.69%	8,310
Guilford	187,564	67.12%	78,462	28.08%	13,409	4.80%	109,102	39.04%	279,435
Halifax	14,952	63.12%	8,155	34.43%	580	2.45%	6,797	28.69%	23,687
Harnett	27,621	44.07%	31,552	50.34%	3,505	5.59%	-3,931	-6.27%	62,678
Haywood	17,204	46.16%	18,155	48.71%	1,910	5.13%	-951	-2.55%	37,269
Henderson	34,261	49.65%	31,303	45.36%	3,445	4.99%	2,958	4.29%	69,009
Hertford	6,153	63.91%	3,239	33.64%	236	2.45%	2,914	30.27%	9,628
Hoke	12,710	57.01%	8,335	37.39%	1,250	5.60%	4,375	19.62%	22,295
Hyde	1,050	44.14%	1,247	52.42%	82	3.44%	-197	-8.28%	2,379
Iredell	44,662	41.22%	57,376	52.95%	6,321	5.83%	-12,714	-11.73%	108,359
Jackson	11,309	52.36%	9,141	42.32%	1,149	5.32%	2,168	10.04%	21,599
Johnston	57,605	47.16%	57,757	47.28%	6,789	5.56%	-152	-0.12%	122,151
Jones	2,217	41.21%	2,928	54.42%	235	4.37%	-711	-13.21%	5,380
Lee	14,455	49.11%	13,363	45.40%	1,614	5.49%	1,092	3.71%	29,432
Lenoir	13,889	51.57%	12,080	44.85%	964	3.58%	1,809	6.72%	26,933
Lincoln	19,084	35.02%	32,188	59.06%	3,225	5.92%	-13,104	-24.04%	54,497
Macon	8,286	38.73%	12,026	56.22%	1,080	5.05%	-3,740	-17.49%	21,392
Madison	6,207	46.38%	6,533	48.81%	644	4.81%	-326	-2.43%	13,384
Martin	6,023	51.01%	5,441	46.08%	344	2.91%	582	4.93%	11,808
McDowell	7,513	32.32%	14,724	63.35%	1,006	4.33%	-7,211	-31.03%	23,243
Mecklenburg	408,882	71.81%	131,361	23.07%	29,174	5.12%	277,521	48.74%	569,417
Mitchell	2,346	27.25%	5,961	69.24%	302	3.51%	-3,615	-41.99%	8,609
Montgomery	4,966	38.35%	7,417	57.28%	566	4.37%	-2,451	-18.93%	12,949
Moore	26,199	43.59%	30,304	50.42%	3,605	5.99%	-4,105	-6.83%	60,108
Nash	28,454	55.26%	21,317	41.40%	1,720	3.34%	7,137	13.86%	51,491
New Hanover	80,834	59.65%	46,537	34.34%	8,145	6.01%	34,297	25.31%	135,516
Northampton	5,549	61.11%	3,277	36.09%	255	2.80%	2,272	25.02%	9,081
Onslow	30,722	38.79%	42,689	53.90%	5,786	7.31%	-11,967	-15.11%	79,197
Orange	69,068	79.88%	14,524	16.80%	2,874	3.32%	54,544	63.08%	86,466
Pamlico	3,193	40.62%	4,309	54.81%	359	4.57%	-1,116	-14.19%	7,861
Pasquotank	9,724	48.45%	9,720	48.43%	628	3.12%	4	0.02%	20,072
Pender	15,485	40.77%	20,077	52.87%	2,415	6.36%	-4,592	-12.10%	37,977
Perquimans	2,436	32.05%	4,967	65.36%	197	2.59%	-2,531	-33.31%	7,600
Person	9,639	45.16%	10,852	50.84%	853	4.00%	-1,213	-5.68%	21,344
Pitt	50,853	59.42%	31,268	36.53%	3,467	4.05%	19,585	22.89%	85,588
Polk	5,509	42.86%	6,736	52.41%	608	4.73%	-1,227	-9.55%	12,853
Randolph	21,907	29.50%	48,450	65.25%	3,894	5.25%	-26,543	-35.75%	74,251
Richmond	8,594	44.31%	10,083	51.98%	719	3.71%	-1,489	-7.67%	19,396
Robeson	18,752	41.43%	24,804	54.80%	1,707	3.77%	-6,052	-13.37%	45,263
Rockingham	19,133	39.37%	27,050	55.66%	2,415	4.97%	-7,917	-16.29%	48,598
Rowan	28,431	38.64%	40,845	55.50%	4,312	5.86%	-12,414	-16.86%	73,588
Rutherford	11,175	33.05%	21,017	62.15%	1,625	4.80%	-9,842	-29.10%	33,817
Sampson	11,211	40.70%	15,341	55.69%	995	3.61%	-4,130	-14.99%	27,547
Scotland	7,123	49.84%	6,730	47.09%	439	3.07%	393	2.75%	14,292
Stanly	11,231	31.22%	22,765	63.29%	1,973	5.49%	-11,534	-32.07%	35,969
Stokes	7,746	29.07%	17,413	65.35%	1,487	5.58%	-9,667	-36.28%	26,646
Surry	12,301	33.47%	22,620	61.54%	1,835	4.99%	-10,319	-28.07%	36,756
Swain	3,053	44.69%	3,442	50.38%	337	4.93%	-389	-5.69%	6,832
Transylvania	10,483	51.31%	9,024	44.17%	925	4.52%	1,459	7.14%	20,432
Tyrrell	761	44.76%	892	52.47%	47	2.77%	-131	-7.71%	1,700
Union	59,608	43.72%	69,031	50.64%	7,689	5.64%	-9,423	-6.92%	136,328
Vance	12,041	61.07%	7,103	36.02%	574	2.91%	4,938	25.05%	19,718
Wake	448,870	69.83%	157,912	24.57%	36,010	5.60%	290,958	45.26%	642,792
Warren	6,412	64.52%	3,223	32.43%	303	3.05%	3,189	32.09%	9,938
Washington	3,312	56.59%	2,378	40.63%	163	2.78%	934	15.96%	5,853
Watauga	19,021	58.73%	11,697	36.12%	1,667	5.15%	7,324	22.61%	32,385
Wayne	25,194	47.00%	26,254	48.97%	2,160	4.03%	-1,060	-1.97%	53,608
Wilkes	9,909	27.96%	23,853	67.30%	1,682	4.74%	-13,944	-39.34%	35,444
Wilson	22,157	56.37%	15,792	40.18%	1,357	3.45%	6,365	16.19%	39,306
Yadkin	5,619	28.14%	13,287	66.53%	1,065	5.33%	-7,668	-38.39%	19,971
Yancey	4,483	40.34%	6,209	55.87%	422	3.79%	-1,726	-15.53%	11,114
Totals	3,069,496	54.90%	2,241,309	40.08%	280,742	5.02%	828,187	14.82%	5,591,547

Counties that flipped from Republican to Democratic

- Alamance (largest city: Burlington)
- Brunswick (largest city: Leland)
- Cabarrus (largest city: Concord)
- Franklin (largest city: Louisburg)
- Henderson (largest city: Hendersonville)
- Jackson (largest city: Cullowhee)
- Lee (largest city: Sanford)
- Transylvania (largest city: Brevard)

=== By congressional district ===
Stein won 12 of 14 congressional districts, including eight that elected Republican representatives, and nine that voted for Donald Trump.

District	Stein	Robinson	Representative	Presidential Result
1st	53%	44%	Don Davis	Trump
2nd	73%	21%	Deborah Ross	Harris
3rd	46%	49%	Greg Murphy	Trump
4th	78%	18%	Valerie Foushee	Harris
5th	48%	47%	Virginia Foxx	Trump
6th	49%	46%	Addison McDowell	Trump
7th	51%	43%	David Rouzer	Trump
8th	47%	48%	Mark Harris	Trump
9th	49%	46%	Richard Hudson	Trump
10th	48%	46%	Pat Harrigan	Trump
11th	51%	44%	Chuck Edwards	Trump
12th	77%	18%	Alma Adams	Harris
13th	49%	45%	Brad Knott	Trump
14th	49%	45%	Tim Moore	Trump

== Voter demographics ==
2024 North Carolina gubernatorial election (CNN)
Demographic subgroup	Stein	Robinson	% of total vote
Ideology
Liberals	96	2	21
Moderates	71	23	40
Conservatives	15	80	39
Party
Democrats	96	2	32
Republicans	13	83	34
Independents	58	35	35
Gender
Men	48	47	48
Women	61	34	52
Age
18–24 years old	59	30	9
25–29 years old	63	32	5
30–39 years old	59	38	15
40–49 years old	58	36	16
50–64 years old	49	47	29
65 and older	54	42	25
Race/ethnicity
White	46	49	69
Black	85	8	19
Latino	53	39	8
Asian	N/A	N/A	1
Other	N/A	N/A	2
Gender by race
White men	42	55	34
White women	51	44	36
Black men	75	13	8
Black women	93	4	11
Latino men	39	51	4
Latino women	67	26	4
Other racial/ethnic groups	55	41	4
White born-again or evangelical Christian?
Yes	22	74	31
No	71	24	69
Education
Never attended college	42	50	16
Some college education	54	42	25
Associate degree	43	52	17
Bachelor's degree	64	33	25
Postgraduate	69	26	16
Education by race
White college graduates	62	34	31
White no college degree	34	62	38
Non-white college graduates	76	21	10
Non-white no college degree	72	19	20
Education by gender/race
White women with college degrees	67	28	16
White women without college degrees	38	58	20
White men with college degrees	57	40	15
White men without college degrees	29	67	19
Non-white	74	20	31
Area type
Urban	74	20	28
Suburban	48	47	53
Rural	45	49	20

== See also ==
- 2024 North Carolina elections

== Notes ==
Partisan clients
