= 2026 North Carolina Senate District 26 Republican primary election =

2026 North Carolina's 26th Senate district Republican primary election
- March 3, 2026

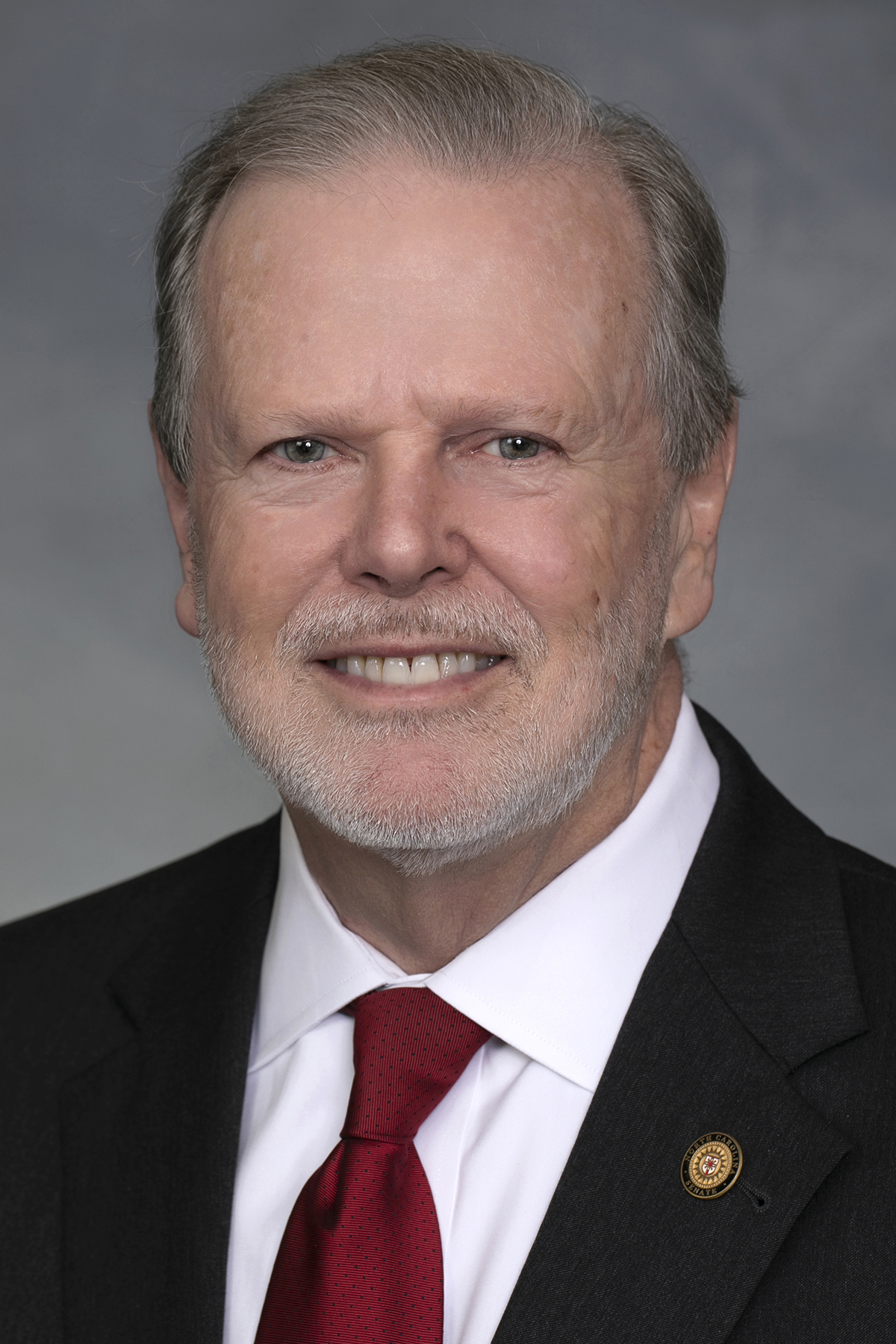
Candidate	Sam Page	Phil Berger
Popular vote	13,135	13,112
Percentage	50.04%	49.96%
- Page: 50–60% 60–70% 70–80% Berger: 50–60% 60–70% 70–80% 80–90%
Previous Republican nominee
Phil Berger
Republican nominee
Sam Page

The Republican Party primary for the 2026 North Carolina's 26th Senate district election took place on March 3, 2026. The 26th district consisted of Rockingham County and portions of suburban Guilford County. The incumbent, president pro tempore Phil Berger, had represented the 26th district and its predecessors since 2001, and had led the North Carolina Republican Senate Caucus since 2005, making him the longest-serving incumbent state senate leader in the country. Berger had been described as one of the most powerful North Carolina politicians.

Sam Page, the sheriff of Rockingham County, announced in February 2025 his intent to run for the seat after years of public feud with Berger. Despite Berger receiving the endorsement of president Donald Trump, on election night unofficial results had Page topping Berger by a margin of only two votes. After multiple recounts, Page's margin widened to 23 votes, and Berger conceded the election on March 24. The election was classified as an upset by The Independent, and received international media attention.

== Background ==
Berger was a resident of Eden, a town in northern Rockingham County, on the border of and adjacent to Sandy Level, Virginia. He was first elected to the North Carolina Senate in 2000, representing the 12th Senate district. At the time, the North Carolina Senate had multi-member districts, and Berger served with future U.S. representative Virginia Foxx, who recruited him to run for the office. Berger was elected leader of the North Carolina Republican Senate Caucus after the 2004 elections. Following the 2010 elections, when the North Carolina Republican Party won a majority in the State Senate for the first time since 1896, Berger was elected president pro tempore.

Page was also a resident of Eden, living a mile away as the crow flies. Page became the sheriff of Rockingham County in 1998. Beginning circa 2011, Page began promoting anti-immigration political positions described as taboo for the time by The Assembly. Page testified before the House Judiciary Community during the 111th United States Congress in support of Secure Communities, a program across North Carolina police departments that increased collaboration with ICE by comparison of federal and local fingerprint databases upon arrest. During the Donald Trump 2016 presidential campaign, Page led the group Sheriffs for Trump, and he served as the North Carolina chair of the Donald Trump 2020 presidential campaign. Page unsuccessfully ran for lieutenant governor in 2024, winning only 10.2% of the vote in the Republican primary and failing to advance to the runoff. Notably, he had received the endorsement of the former acting ICE director, Tom Homan.

== Campaign ==
Berger received the endorsement of President Donald Trump, though both candidates attempted to align themselves with him. Page has described himself as a "passionate supporter" of Trump, and his campaign website states that he "stands with Donald Trump". Berger, while campaigning for the election, spent $10 million.

== Results ==
The unofficial returns for the primary election are as follows:

North Carolina Senate 26th district Republican primary election, 2026
Party	Candidate	Votes	%
Republican	Sam Page	13,135	50.04%
Republican	Phil Berger (incumbent)	13,112	49.96%
Total votes		26,247	100%

== Aftermath ==
After the election was held, Page declared at his election party that he had won, while Berger announced that he would wait until further results were reported. In the two counties, a total of 189 provisional votes remain to be counted in the race, with 137 in Rockingham, and 52 in Guilford. The remaining provisional and absentee ballots will be counted and reviewed by March 6, while ballots mailed from overseas, with a deadline of being received by March 12, will be counted on March 13.
