= 2024 North Carolina lieutenant gubernatorial election =

- November 5, 2024
- Turnout: 73.73% ▼1.62 pp
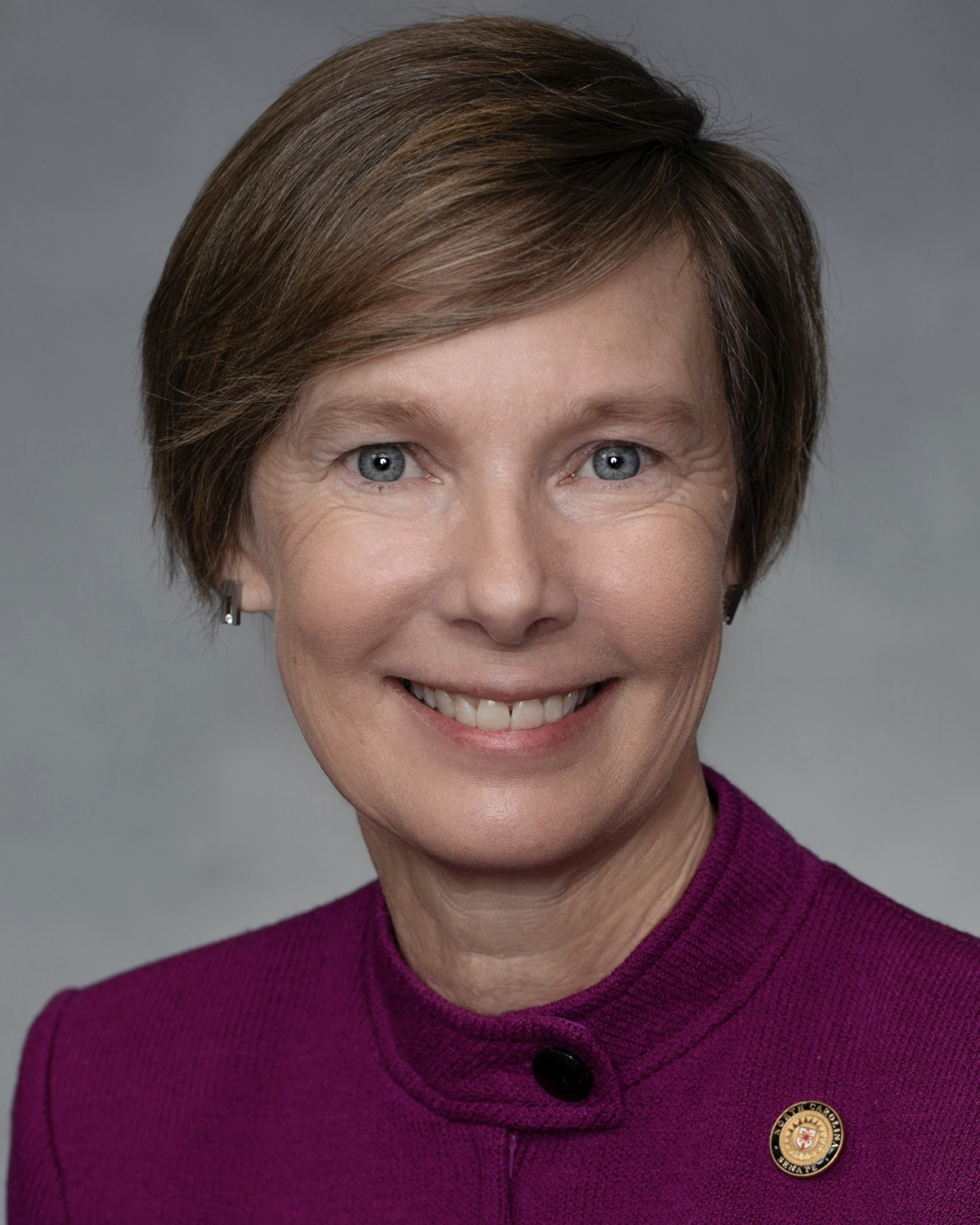

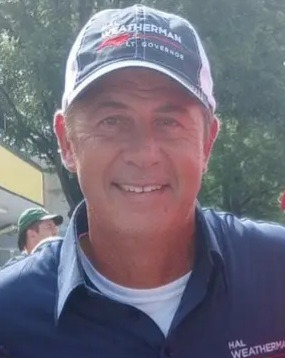
Nominee	Rachel Hunt	Hal Weatherman
Party	Democratic	Republican
Popular vote	2,768,539	2,663,183
Percentage	49.53%	47.64%
- Hunt: 40–50% 50–60% 60–70% 70–80% 80–90% >90% Weatherman: 40–50% 50–60% 60–70% 70–80% 80–90% >90% Tie: 40–50% No votes
Lieutenant Governor before election
Mark Robinson
Republican
Elected Lieutenant Governor
Rachel Hunt
Democratic

The 2024 North Carolina lieutenant gubernatorial election was held on November 5, 2024, to elect the lieutenant governor of North Carolina. Democratic state Senator Rachel Hunt won her first term in office, defeating Republican state official Hal Weatherman. She succeeded Republican incumbent Mark Robinson, who did not seek re-election in order to unsuccessfully run for governor.

In her party's primary, Hunt won the Democratic nomination with 70% of the vote over former state Senator Ben Clark and businessman Mark H. Robinson (no relation to the incumbent). Weatherman won the Republican nomination with 74% of the vote over Forsyth County District Attorney Jim O'Neil in a runoff after no candidate received over 30% of the vote in his party's primary. Hunt won the general election with 49.5% the vote to Weatherman's 47.6%, making her the first Democrat elected lieutenant governor of North Carolina since Walter Dalton in 2008.

== Republican primary ==
=== Candidates ===
==== Nominee ====
- Hal Weatherman, businessman and former chief of staff to Lieutenant Governor Dan Forest

==== Eliminated in runoff ====
- Jim O'Neill, Forsyth County district attorney and nominee for attorney general in 2020

==== Eliminated in primary ====
- Deanna Ballard, former state senator from the 45th district
- Peter Boykin, political commentator and founder of Gays for Trump
- Rivera Douthit, evangelist
- Jeffrey Elmore, state representative from the 94th district
- Allen Mashburn, pastor
- Marlenis Hernandez Novoa, paramedic and firefighter
- Sam Page, Rockingham County sheriff
- Ernest T. Reeves, businessman and perennial candidate
- Seth Woodall, attorney

==== Withdrawn ====
- Jim Kee, former Greensboro city councilor (ran for state auditor)

==== Declined ====
- Mark Robinson, incumbent lieutenant governor (endorsed Weatherman, ran for governor)

==== Endorsements ====
Jeffrey Elmore

Newspapers

- The Charlotte Observer
Allen Mashburn

Organizations

- New York Young Republican Club
Hal Weatherman

State officials

- Mark Robinson, lieutenant governor of North Carolina (2021-2025), nominee for governor in 2024

Newspapers

- Rhino Times

=== Polling ===
Poll source	Date(s) administered	Sample size (Note: Key: A – all adults RV – registered voters LV – likely voters V – unclear)	Margin of error	Deanna Ballard	Jeffrey Elmore	Jim O'Neill	Sam Page	Hal Weatherman	Seth Wooddall	Other	Undecided
High Point University	February 16–23, 2024	386 (LV)	± 6.0%	10%	11%	27%	13%	7%	11%	21% (Note: Peter Boykin with 7%; Allen Mashburn, Marlenis Hernandez Navoa, and Ernest Reeves with 4%; Rivera Douthit with 2%)	–
Capen Analytics	February 21, 2024	12,580 (LV)	± 5.0%	15%	8%	16%	8%	21%	18%	15% (Note: Marlenis Hernandez Navoa with 5%; Peter Boykin, Allen Mashburn, and Ernest Reeves with 3%; Rivera Douthit with 1%)	3%
Cygnal (R) (Note: Poll sponsored by the John Locke Foundation)	October 8–9, 2023	600 (LV)	± 3.9%	3%	1%	–	4%	4%	2%	2% (Note: Peter Boykin and Allen Mashburn with 1%; Rivera Douthit with 0%)	84%

=== Results ===
Results by county: Weatherman: 40–50%; 30–40%; 20–30%; 10–20%; O'Neill: 40–50%; 30–40%; 20–30%; 10–20%; Ballard: 50–60%; 40–50%; 30–40%; 20–30%; 10–20%; Page: 50–60%; 40–50%; 30–40%; 20–30%; Mashburn: 20–30%; Elmore: 50–60%; 30–40%

Republican primary results
Party	Candidate	Votes	%
Republican	Hal Weatherman	181,818	19.59%
Republican	Jim O'Neill	147,042	15.84%
Republican	Deanna Ballard	138,822	14.96%
Republican	Seth Woodall	102,492	11.04%
Republican	Sam Page	94,810	10.22%
Republican	Allen Mashburn	83,550	9.00%
Republican	Jeffrey Elmore	79,883	8.61%
Republican	Peter Boykin	32,126	3.46%
Republican	Rivera Douthit	23,398	2.52%
Republican	Ernest T. Reeves	22,760	2.45%
Republican	Marlenis Hernandez Novoa	21,404	2.31%
Total votes		928,105	100.0%

=== Runoff results ===
Results by county: Weatherman: 50–60%; 60–70%; 70–80%; 80–90%; >90%; O'Neill: 50–60%

Republican primary runoff results
Party	Candidate	Votes	%
Republican	Hal Weatherman	96,600	74.44%
Republican	Jim O'Neill	33,448	25.72%
Total votes		130,048	100.0%

== Democratic primary ==
=== Candidates ===
==== Nominee ====
- Rachel Hunt, state senator from the 42nd district and daughter of former Governor Jim Hunt

==== Eliminated in primary ====
- Ben Clark, former state senator from the 21st district and nominee for North Carolina's 9th congressional district in 2022
- Mark H. Robinson, businessman (no relation to incumbent lieutenant governor Mark Robinson)

==== Withdrawn ====
- Delmonte Crawford, civil rights activist (ran for mayor of Raleigh)
- Chris Rey, former mayor of Spring Lake and candidate for U.S. Senate in 2016
- Raymond Smith Jr., former state representative from the 21st district (ran for mayor of Goldsboro)

==== Endorsements ====
Rachel Hunt

Organizations

- EMILY's List

Newspapers

- The Charlotte Observer

==== Polling ====
Poll source	Date(s) administered	Sample size	Margin of error	Ben Clark	Rachel Hunt	Mark H. Robinson	Undecided
High Point University	February 16–23, 2024	321 (LV)	± 6.0%	14%	61%	24%	–
Public Policy Polling (D)	December 15–16, 2023	556 (LV)	± 4.2%	5%	23%	6%	66%

=== Results ===
Results by county: Hunt: 80–90%; 70–80%; 60–70%; 50–60%; 40–50%; Clark: 60–70%; 50–60%; 40–50%; 30–40%; Robinson: 50–60%; 40–50%

Democratic primary results
Party	Candidate	Votes	%
Democratic	Rachel Hunt	477,196	70.35%
Democratic	Ben Clark	111,836	16.49%
Democratic	Mark H. Robinson	89,247	13.16%
Total votes		678,279	100.0%

== Libertarian Party ==
=== Withdrew after nomination ===
- Dee Watson, oncology researcher

=== Replacement nominee ===
- Shannon Bray, cybersecurity professional and nominee for U.S. Senate in 2020 and 2022

== Constitution Party ==
=== Nominee ===
- Wayne Jones, central regional director for the North Carolina Constitution Party

== General election ==
=== Predictions ===
Source	Ranking	As of
Sabato's Crystal Ball	Tossup	November 1, 2024

=== Polling ===
Poll source	Date(s) administered	Sample size	Margin of error	Hal Weatherman (R)	Rachel Hunt (D)	Other	Undecided
ActiVote	October 8–26, 2024	400 (LV)	± 4.9%	50%	50%	–	–
Cygnal (R) (Note: Poll sponsored by the Carolina Journal)	October 12–14, 2024	600 (LV)	± 4.0%	41%	43%	3% (Note: Bray (L) with 2%; Jones (C) with 1%)	13%
ActiVote	August 20 – September 22, 2024	400 (LV)	± 4.9%	50%	50%	–	–
Cygnal (R)	September 15–16, 2024	600 (LV)	± 4.0%	40%	42%	3% (Note: Bray (L) with 2%; Jones (C) with 1%)	15%
YouGov (D) (Note: Poll sponsored by Carolina Forward)	August 5–9, 2024	802 (RV)	± 3.9%	38%	40%	–	22%
Cygnal (R)	August 4–5, 2024	600 (LV)	± 3.99%	38%	36%	5% (Note: Bray (L) with 5%)	22%
Spry Strategies	June 7–11, 2024	600 (LV)	± 4.0%	38%	38%	–	24%

=== Results ===
2024 North Carolina lieutenant gubernatorial election
Party	Candidate	Votes	%	±%
Democratic	Rachel Hunt	2,768,539	49.53%	+1.16%
Republican	Hal Weatherman	2,663,183	47.64%	–3.99%
Libertarian	Shannon Bray	104,192	1.86%	N/A
Constitution	Wayne Jones	53,938	0.96%	N/A
Total votes		5,589,852	100.0%	
Democratic gain from Republican				

Counties that flipped from Republican to Democratic

- New Hanover (largest municipality: Wilmington)
- Nash (largest municipality: Rocky Mount)

==== By congressional district ====
Despite losing the state, Weatherman won ten of 14 congressional districts.

District	Weatherman	Hunt	Representative
1st	48%	50%	Don Davis
2nd	30%	67%	Deborah Ross
3rd	56%	41%	Greg Murphy
4th	25%	73%	Valerie Foushee
5th	55%	42%	Virginia Foxx
6th	54%	43%	Addison McDowell
7th	52%	45%	David Rouzer
8th	56%	42%	Mark Harris
9th	54%	43%	Richard Hudson
10th	55%	42%	Pat Harrigan
11th	51%	46%	Chuck Edwards
12th	24%	73%	Alma Adams
13th	54%	43%	Brad Knott
14th	53%	44%	Tim Moore

== Notes ==
Partisan clients
