= Sam Page (North Carolina politician) =

American politician and law enforcement officer

Member-elect of the North Carolina Senate from the 26th district
- Assuming office January 1, 2027
- Succeeding: Phil Berger

Sheriff of Rockingham County, North Carolina
- Incumbent
- Assumed office 1998
- Preceded by: Bobby Vernon

Personal details
- Born: 1956 or 1957 (age 69–70)
- Party: Republican (c. 1990s–present); Democratic (until c. 1990s)
- Website: www.sampagenc.com

Military service
- Branch/service: United States Air Force
- Years of service: 1975–1980

Samuel Scott Page (born 1956 or 1957) is an American law enforcement officer and politician who has served as the sheriff of Rockingham County, North Carolina, United States since 1998.

In 2026, he challenged incumbent President pro tempore Phil Berger in the Republican primary election for the 26th Senate district. The district includes Rockingham County and part of Guilford County, North Carolina. He previously ran for the Republican nomination for lieutenant governor in 2024, placing fifth with 10.22% of the vote.

== Early life and career ==
Page attended Reidsville High School before serving in the United States Air Force. He served from 1975 to 1980 as a security forces K-9 handler.

== Political career ==
Page has served as the elected sheriff of Rockingham County, North Carolina, United States since 1998. He had previously run for the post as a Democrat in 1994 before changing his party affiliation.

Page ran for Lieutenant Governor of North Carolina in 2024, but did not win the Republican nomination.

In 2026, he chose not to run for another four-year term as sheriff, instead running for a seat in the state Senate. Page narrowly won the March 2026 primary against incumbent Sen. Phil Berger.

== Electoral history ==
=== 2026 ===
North Carolina Senate 26th district primary election, 2026
Party	Candidate	Votes	%
Republican	Sam Page	13,135	50.04%
Republican	Phil Berger (incumbent)	13,112	49.96%

=== 2024 ===
North Carolina Lieutenant Governor primary election, 2024
Party	Candidate	Votes	%
Republican	Hal Weatherman	181,818	19.59%
Republican	Jim O'Neill	147,042	15.84%
Republican	Deanna Ballard	138,822	14.96%
Republican	Seth Woodall	102,492	11.04%
Republican	Sam Page	94,810	10.22%
Republican	Allen Mashburn	83,550	9.00%
Republican	Jeffrey Elmore	79,883	8.61%
Republican	Peter Boykin	32,126	3.46%
Republican	Rivera Douthit	23,398	2.52%
Republican	Ernest T. Reeves	22,760	2.45%
Republican	Marlenis Hernandez Novoa	21,404	2.31%
Total votes		928,105	100.0%

=== 2022 ===
Rockingham County Sheriff general election, 2022
Party	Candidate	Votes	%	±%
Republican	Sam Page	21,375	65.74%	−34.26%
Democratic	Tyrone Scales	6,141	18.89%	+18.89%
Independent	Darren Wright	4.996	15.37%	+15.37%
Total votes		32,512		
Republican hold				

=== 2018 ===
Rockingham County Sheriff general election, 2018
Party	Candidate	Votes	%	±%
Republican	Sam Page	25,981	100.00%	+24.07%
Total votes		25,981		
Republican hold				

=== 2014 ===
Rockingham County Sheriff general election, 2014
Party	Candidate	Votes	%	±%
Republican	Sam Page	21,083	75.93%	+9.62%
Democratic	John Ferrell	6,684	24.07%	−9.62%
Total votes		27,767		
Republican hold				

=== 2010 ===
Rockingham County Sheriff general election, 2010
Party	Candidate	Votes	%	±%
Republican	Sam Page	17,321	66.31%	
Democratic	Bryan K. Wallace	8,799	33.69%	
Total votes		26,120		
Republican hold				

=== 1998 ===
Rockingham County Sheriff general election, 1998 (election night)
Party	Candidate	Votes	%
Republican	Sam Page	14,228	58.33%
Democratic	Bobby Vernon (incumbent)	10,165	41.67%
Total votes		24,393	
Republican gain from Democratic			

=== 1994 ===
Rockingham County Sheriff primary election, 1994 (election night)
Party	Candidate	Votes	%
Democratic	Bobby Vernon (incumbent)	6,246	54.59%
Democratic	Sam Page	2,628	22.97%
Democratic	Arey Lambeth	1,515	13.24%
Democratic	Bobby Lee Tilley	1,053	9.20%
Total votes		11,442	100.00%
