= Mark Walker (North Carolina politician) =

American politician and pastor (born 1969)

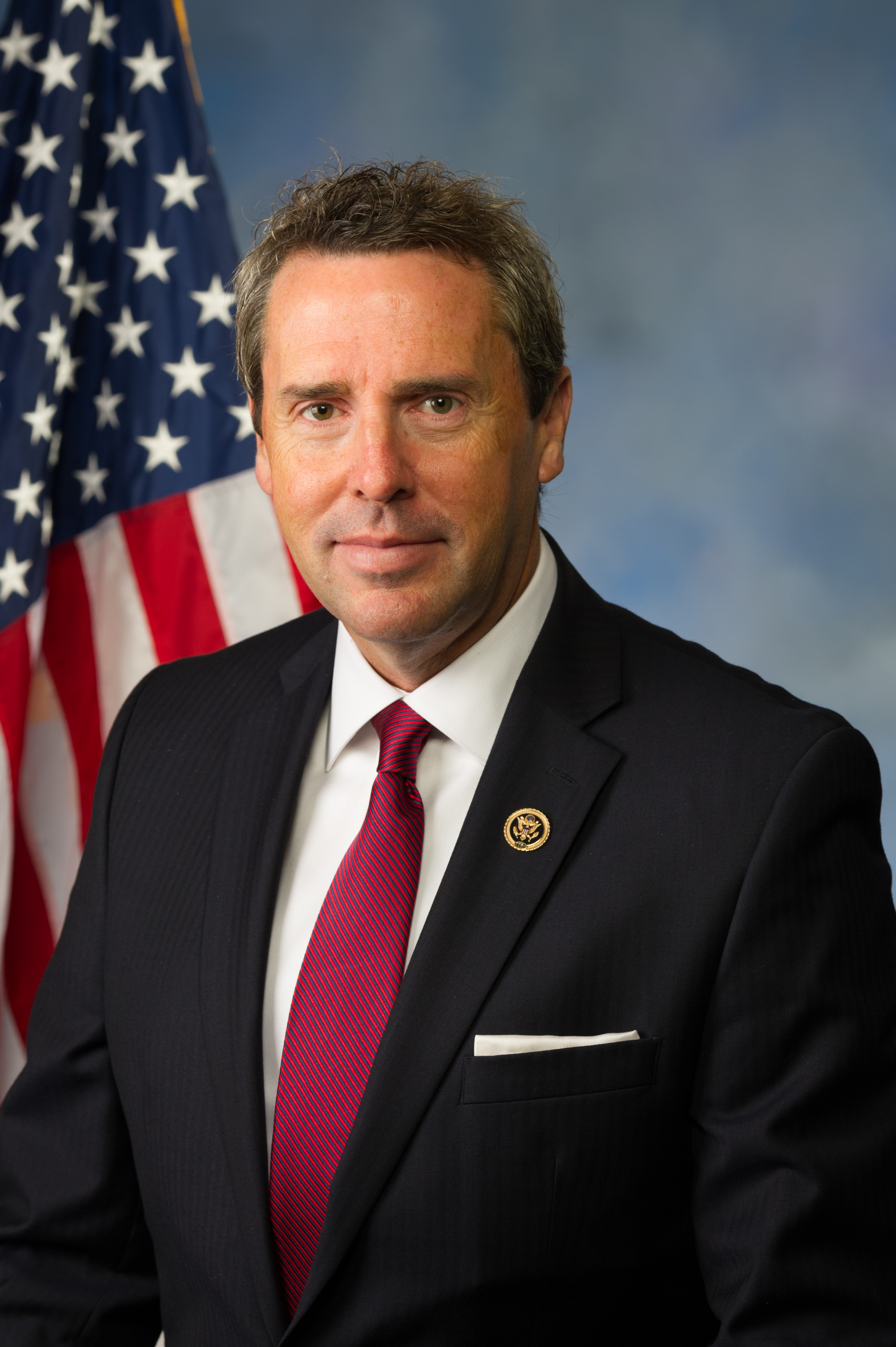
- Official portrait, 2017

Vice Chair of the House Republican Conference
- In office January 3, 2019 – January 3, 2021
- Leader: Kevin McCarthy
- Preceded by: Doug Collins
- Succeeded by: Mike Johnson

Chair of the Republican Study Committee
- In office January 3, 2017 – January 3, 2019
- Preceded by: Bill Flores
- Succeeded by: Mike Johnson

Member of the U.S. House of Representatives from North Carolina's 6th district
- In office January 3, 2015 – January 3, 2021
- Preceded by: Howard Coble
- Succeeded by: Kathy Manning

Personal details
- Born: Bradley Mark Walker; May 20, 1969 (age 57) Dothan, Alabama, U.S.
- Party: Republican
- Spouse: Kelly Sears
- Children: 3
- Education: Trinity Baptist College (attended); Piedmont International University (BA)
- Walker's voice Walker on the Tax Cuts and Jobs Act. Recorded November 16, 2017

Bradley Mark Walker (born May 20, 1969) is an American politician and pastor who served as the U.S. representative for North Carolina's 6th congressional district from 2015 to 2021. A member of the Republican Party, he was the Republican Study Committee chair in 2017 and vice chair of the House Republican Conference in 2019.

Walker unsuccessfully ran for Senate in the 2022 election, placing third in the Republican primary. He was also briefly a candidate in the 2024 North Carolina gubernatorial election and U.S. House election before withdrawing from that race to join Donald Trump's presidential campaign.

On April 10, 2025, President Donald Trump announced his intention to nominate Walker to be the U.S. Ambassador at Large for International Religious Freedom, a position within the State Department. However, the Senate failed to act on Walker's nomination before adjourning for the year and his nomination expired. On January 8, 2026, Walker announced that he was withdrawing from consideration to serve as Ambassador at Large and instead he was appointed to serve as the Principal Advisor on Global Religious Freedom to the State Department. Walker left this newly created position on April 21, 2026. Walker has filed paperwork to challenge U.S. Senator Ted Budd in the 2028 U.S. Senate election in North Carolina.

== Early life and education ==
Walker was born on May 20, 1969, in Dothan, Alabama. He eventually attended Trinity Baptist College in Jacksonville, Florida for a time before moving with his family to Houston. From there, Walker moved to the Piedmont Triad. He worked in business and finance for several years. Walker eventually returned to college to pursue the ministry and attend Piedmont Baptist College in Winston-Salem, North Carolina now Carolina University, graduating with a B.A. in Biblical studies.

== Early career ==
In 2006, he became pastor of Northside Baptist Church in Charlotte, North Carolina (Southern Baptist Convention). In 2008, he became pastor at Lawndale Baptist Church in Greensboro, North Carolina. The church has a membership of several thousand congregants.

== U.S. House of Representatives ==
=== Elections ===
2014

Republican Howard Coble had represented the 6th district since 1985 when he announced his retirement at age 83. Coble supported Phil Berger Jr. in the May primary election and Walker finished second, though in the runoff election, Walker unexpectedly won 60% to 40%. Most of Walker's election funding came from individual contributions, which he noted in his primary victory speech. In the general election, Walker defeated Democratic attorney Laura Fjeld of Hillsborough. "I certainly do align with the Republican Party when it comes to traditional values," Walker said after the election, "but even so, limited government is my heart and my nature and I think that says a lot about North Carolina and maybe we are still more red than purple." He said that in his term he hoped to address poverty, immigration, and education issues.

2016

Walker significantly outspent his opponent, Democrat Pete Glidewell, in the 2016 campaign; Walker's $818,000, about 40% from national political action committees (PACs), was nine times what Glidewell had fundraised. All North Carolina incumbents retained their seats; in the 6th district, Walker received 59% of the vote. Neither Walker nor Glidewell won their home county in the election.

During the 2016 presidential election, Walker called some of Republican nominee Donald Trump's remarks "morally reprehensible" and condemned Trump's lewd remarks about women as "vile." Nevertheless, Walker still backed Trump over his Democratic opponent, Hillary Clinton. After the election, Walker expressed support for incoming president Trump on the issues of taxes and education, but said he could not stand behind Trump's statements about a registry tracking Muslim Americans.

2018

Walker faced no primary challenger in 2018. On April 20, Walker's campaign raised $650,000 during a luncheon attended by Vice President Mike Pence, the largest sum in U.S. House history, effectively doubling what Walker had previously raised. In the general election, he defeated Democrat Ryan Watts of Burlington by about 13 percentage points.

2020

In June 2019, Walker decided against challenging Senator Thom Tillis in 2020, reportedly giving relief to Republican leaders who feared a bitter primary would hurt their prospects of retaining a U.S. Senate majority.

In November 2019, at the urging of a three-judge panel of the state Superior Court hearing the case Harper v Lewis, the North Carolina General Assembly adopted on a party-line vote (with Republicans prevailing) a new U.S. congressional district map for the state that substantially changed Walker's district. The old 6th covered Rockingham, Caswell, Person, Alamance, Randolph, Chatham and Lee counties and northern and eastern Guilford County. The new 6th was a much more compact district covering all of Guilford County and extending west into Forsyth County, including almost all of Winston-Salem. The change dramatically shifted the 6th's partisan balance. Based on 2010-2016 election data, plaintiffs in Harper v. Lewis estimated that Hillary Clinton would have carried the redrawn 6th with 59 percent of the vote had it existed in 2016–a mirror image of Donald Trump's 56 percent margin in the old 6th. This led political observers to suggest that Walker's seat would likely be a Democratic pick-up in 2020. Walker's seat was one of two Republican-held seats that swung heavily to the Democrats as a result of the new map. Indeed, on paper the new 6th was one of the most Democratic white-majority districts in the South.

On December 16, 2019, Walker announced that he would not run for re-election in 2020.

=== Tenure and political positions ===
Walker holds "deeply conservative" beliefs. He is an avowed opponent of the Affordable Care Act, and has led the conservative Republican Study Committee's efforts to repeal the health care reform legislation. He has called for "full repeal" of the legislation, and criticized 2015 Republican-sponsored legislation that would repeal only part of the act. In December 2016, Walker was one of only 33 Republican U.S. Representatives to vote "no" on a short-term stopgap funding measure that would appropriate millions of dollars in federal disaster relief spending in the wake of Hurricane Matthew. Walker said that he opposed such stopgap funding bills.

Walker has led efforts to improve the Republican Party's outreach to African Americans, and organized a February 2017 conference between the presidents and chancellors of historically black colleges and universities (HBCUs) and Republican congressional leaders. He also worked with fellow Representative Alma Adams, a Democrat from North Carolina, to start an internship program for students from HBCUs. He is supportive of criminal justice reform initiatives, and has called for a shift in Republican approach to this issue.

He introduced the legislation H.R. 4369 Prison to Prosperity Act, inspired by author and prison reform activist Lynch Hunt.

In 2017, Walker became co-chair of the Congressional Prayer Caucus. During his 2018 service on a committee searching for the next House chaplain, Walker called for the committee to select a candidate "that has adult children," which would have effectively excluded Catholic priests and nuns from consideration. Fellow House member Rep. Gerry Connolly characterized Walker's suggestion as "anti-Catholic on its face." During the controversy that followed, House Speaker Paul Ryan's spokesperson announced that "Mr. Walker will not serve in a formal capacity" on the screening committee.

Walker played for the Republicans in the annual Congressional Baseball Game; he was a pitcher in the 2016 game.

==== Republican Study Committee ====
In 2016, Walker launched a campaign to become chairman of the Republican Study Committee (RSC), a faction of highly conservative Republicans. Walker defeated Andy Harris of Maryland in the November 2016 election, becoming the youngest RSC chairman in history.

==== House Bill 2 ====
Walker is a proponent of North Carolina's Public Facilities Privacy & Security Act ("HB2"), a controversial piece of legislation which was read, amended, passed and signed in a matter of hours on March 23, 2016. On March 28, 2016, as businesses and local governments began registering opposition to HB2, Walker tweeted, "I'm growing weary of the big business and corporate bullying over HB2."

==== Violence Against Women Act ====
In 2019, Walker voted against reauthorization of the Violence Against Women Act, which passed the House on a bipartisan vote (33 Republicans joining 230 Democrats voting 'aye'). He also voted against an amendment to the Act authorizing federal grants "for the purpose of reducing sexual violence on college campuses," which passed by a 258 to 173 margin.

==== Health care ====
Walker's 2014 campaign web site stated "Obamacare should be repealed, and Mark will make doing so one of his top legislative priorities." In 2019, Walker voted against a House resolution that called on the U.S. Dept. of Justice to stop supporting plaintiffs' efforts in Texas v United States seeking to overturn the Affordable Care Act.

==== Remarks ====
Walker has made controversial statements that have brought him national attention; for example, in 2017 he described women colleagues publicly as "eye candy". On May 15, 2017, Walker posted a tweet in which he criticized the construction of specially made ramps allowing ducks to get into and out of the U.S. Capitol Reflecting Pool. In it, he called the move "government waste". The tweet was widely criticized on social media.

During his 2014 campaign, at a Tea Party forum in Rockingham County, North Carolina, Walker was asked if military force was appropriate along the U.S.-Mexican border. He said that the National Guard might be necessary to secure the border. He added, "if you have foreigners who are sneaking in with drug cartels, to me that is a national threat, and if we got to go laser or blitz somebody[...] I don't have a problem with that either." The moderator then asked if he had any qualms about starting a war with Mexico. Walker responded, "Well, we did it before, if we need to do it again, I don't have a qualm about it." Later, Walker met with the editors of Greensboro's News & Record to tell them, "Being someone who is not a career politician, I've learned there are different environments that are a little more heated in context. And when you walk into those by proxy, you have to be very concerned as well as being very upfront about what your positions are because you can be guided very easily."

==== Security breach of House of Representatives SCIF ====
In October 2019, violating congressional rules, Walker was part of a group of Republican congresspersons who stormed into a closed committee inquiry which had been conducting an investigation related to alleged violations by President Trump. The effect was to delay the proceedings by five hours. Walker brought his cell phone into the room which was a security violation.

==== Texas v. Pennsylvania ====
In December 2020, Walker was one of 126 Republican members of the House of Representatives who signed an amicus brief in support of Texas v. Pennsylvania, a lawsuit filed at the United States Supreme Court contesting the results of the 2020 presidential election, in which Joe Biden prevailed over incumbent Donald Trump.

=== Hayes indictment ===
Following the April 2019 indictment of former Rep. Robin Hayes for allegedly attempting to bribe state insurance officials, Politico identified Walker as the unnamed "Public Official A" in the indictment who called state insurance officials after a political committee under his control received a $150,000 donation. Walker was not indicted or named in the indictment. He denied any wrongdoing and said he has been fully cooperating with the probe.

=== Committee assignments ===
- Committee on Homeland Security
  - Subcommittee on Emergency Preparedness, Response, and Communications
  - Subcommittee on Transportation Security
- Committee on Oversight and Government Reform
  - Subcommittee on Information Technology
- Committee on House Administration (Vice Ranking Member)

== Post-Congressional Career ==
=== 2022 U.S. Senate Campaign ===
On December 1, 2020, Walker announced his candidacy for the open U.S. Senate seat to be vacated by retiring Republican senator Richard Burr. Walker's primary opponents included U.S. Representative Ted Budd and former Governor Pat McCrory. Budd received the endorsement of former president Donald Trump and won the nomination, with Walker finishing behind McCrory in third place.

=== 2024 North Carolina Gubernatorial Campaign ===
Walker announced his candidacy for the 2024 North Carolina gubernatorial election. In October 2023, he withdrew from the governor's race to run for his old House seat.

=== 2024 U.S. House Campaign ===
In October 2023, he withdrew from the governor's race to run for his old House seat. Addison McDowell finished in first place in the Republican primary election with 26% of the vote, short of the 30% of the vote required to avoid a runoff election, and Walker finished in second place, with 24%. Though Walker initially indicated that he wanted a runoff election, he opted to withdraw from the race and joined the Donald Trump 2024 presidential campaign, making McDowell the Republican nominee.

=== Trump Administration ===
On April 10, 2025, President Donald Trump announced his intention to nominate Walker to be the U.S. Ambassador at Large for International Religious Freedom, a position within the State Department.

Reports started circling that U.S. Senator Ted Budd, who defeated Walker in the 2022 U.S. Senate primary, was "working behind the scenes" to block Walker's nomination.

After the Senate failed to act on Walker's nomination before adjourning for the year, his nomination expired. On January 8, 2026, Walker announced that he was withdrawing from consideration for the position of Ambassador at Large and instead was appointed to serve as the Principal Advisor on Global Religious Freedom to the State Department. Walker left this newly created position on April 21, 2026.

=== 2028 U.S. Senate campaign ===
Walker has filed paperwork to challenge U.S. Senator Ted Budd in the 2028 U.S. Senate election in North Carolina.

== Personal life ==
Walker is married to Kelly Sears, a nurse practitioner. They have three children and live in Summerfield, North Carolina, north suburb of Greensboro.

== Electoral history ==
2014 North Carolina's 6th congressional district election
Party	Candidate	Votes	%
Republican	Mark Walker	147,312	58.7
Democratic	Laura Fjeld	103,758	41.3
Total votes		251,070	100.0
Republican hold			

2016 North Carolina's 6th congressional district election
Party	Candidate	Votes	%
Republican	Mark Walker (incumbent)	207,983	59.2
Democratic	Pete Glidewell	143,167	40.8
Total votes		351,150	100.0
Republican hold			

2018 North Carolina's 6th congressional district election
Party	Candidate	Votes	%
Republican	Mark Walker (incumbent)	160,709	56.5
Democratic	Ryan Watts	123,651	43.5
Total votes		284,360	100.0
Republican hold			

2022 Republican primary results, U.S. Senate campaign in North Carolina
Party	Candidate	Votes	%
Republican	Ted Budd	448,128	58.61%
Republican	Pat McCrory	188,135	24.60%
Republican	Mark Walker	70,486	9.22%
Republican	Marjorie Eastman	22,535	2.95%
Republican	David Flaherty	7,265	0.95%
Republican	Kenneth Harper, Jr.	7,129	0.93%
Republican	Jen Banwart	3,088	0.40%
Republican	Charles Kenneth Moss	2,920	0.38%
Republican	Leonard Bryant	2,906	0.38%
Republican	Benjamin E. Griffiths	2,870	0.38%
Republican	Debora Tshiovo	2,741	0.36%
Republican	Lee A. Brian	2,232	0.29%
Republican	Lichia Sibhatu	2,191	0.29%
Republican	Drew Bulecza	2,022	0.26%
Total votes		764,648	100.0%

U.S. House of Representatives
Preceded by Howard Coble	Member of the U.S. House of Representatives from North Carolina's 6th congressional district 2015–2021	Succeeded by Kathy Manning
Party political offices
Preceded by Bill Flores	Chair of the Republican Study Committee; 2017–2019	Succeeded by Mike Johnson
Preceded by Doug Collins	Vice Chair of the House Republican Conference; 2019–2021	Succeeded by Mike Johnson
U.S. order of precedence (ceremonial)
Preceded by Robert Pittenger as Former U.S. Representative	Order of precedence of the United States as Former U.S. Representative	Succeeded by Ronald Machtley as Former U.S. Representative
