= Lynch Hunt =

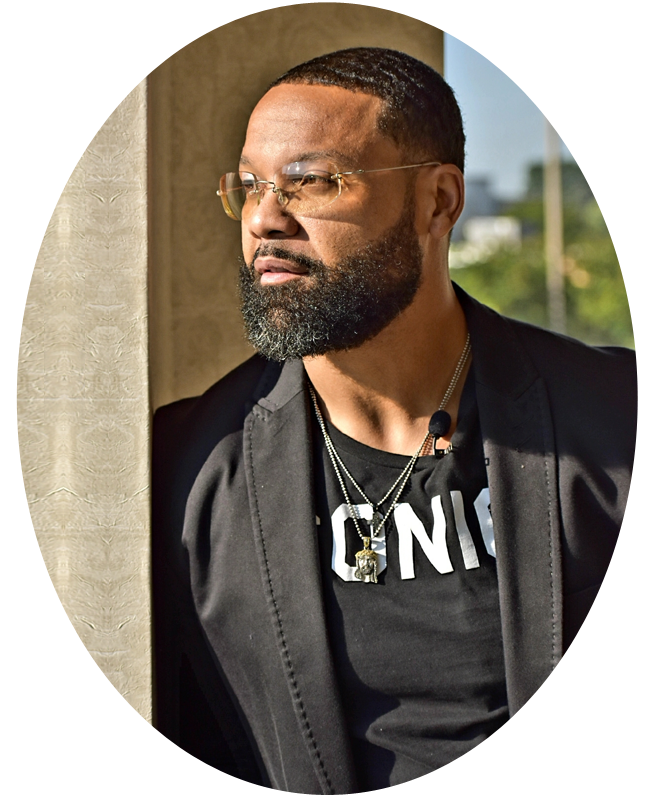
- Website: www.iamcoachlynch.com

Lynch Hunt is an American author and prison reform activist. His book Prison to Prosperity (2019) was the basis and inspiration for US H.R. 4369, the proposed Prison to Prosperity Act, introduced by Rep. Mark Walker.

== Arrest ==
On September 20, 2003, he was arrested for conspiracy to distribute cocaine and crack cocaine. He was subsequently convicted and served ten years in prison. He was released on July 12, 2012.

== Books ==
- 7 Levels of Discipline that Manifest Success (2016)
- Accelerate Your Resultz Affirmation Cards (2018)
- Prison to Prosperity (2019)
- 5 Psychological Disciplines Affirmation Cards (2020)
- Kids Affirmation Cards (2020)
- 30 Day Road map Affirmation Cards (2020)
- AWOL Nutrition Guide (2020)

== Other work ==
Lynch is the resident health and wellness expert for the WFMY2 Good Morning Show, hosting a weekly segment called "Motivation Mondays".
