= Phil Berger (politician) =

American politician

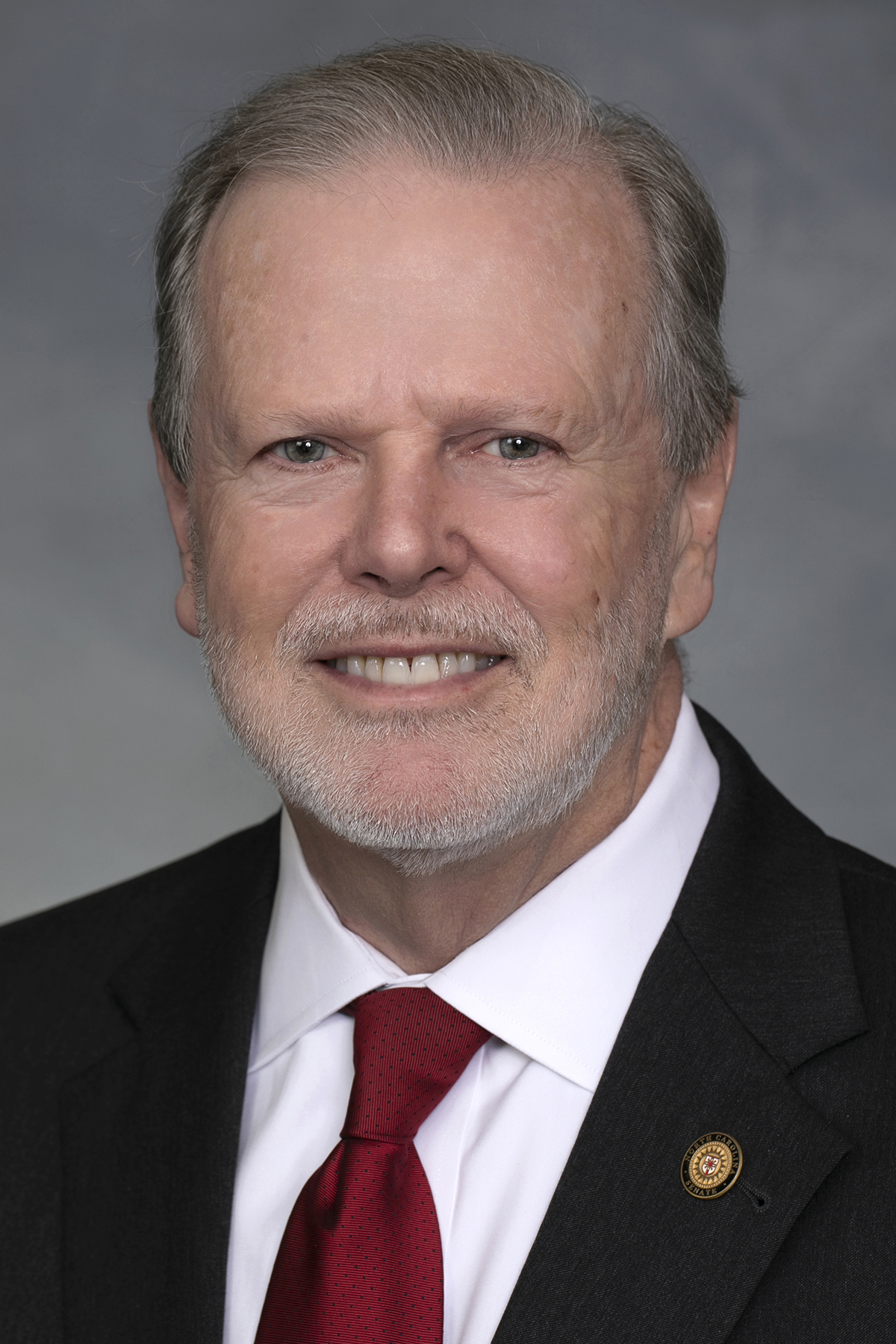
- Official portrait, 2023

President pro tempore of the North Carolina Senate
- Incumbent
- Assumed office January 26, 2011
- Preceded by: Marc Basnight

Minority Leader of the North Carolina Senate
- In office January 1, 2005 – January 1, 2011
- Preceded by: Patrick J. Ballantine
- Succeeded by: Martin Nesbitt

Member of the North Carolina Senate
- Incumbent
- Assumed office January 1, 2001
- Preceded by: Don W. East
- Constituency: 12th district (2001–2003); 26th district (2003–2019, 2023–present); 30th district (2019–2023)

Personal details
- Born: Philip Edward Berger; August 8, 1952 (age 74) New Rochelle, New York, U.S.
- Party: Republican
- Spouse: Patricia Hays
- Children: 3, including Phil
- Education: Danville Community College (attended); Averett University (BA); Wake Forest University (JD)
- Website: State Senate website

Philip Edward Berger (born August 8, 1952) is a Republican member of the North Carolina General Assembly representing the state's 26th Senate district, which includes Guilford, and Rockingham, counties.

Born in New York, Berger was first elected to the North Carolina Senate in 2000. He became minority leader in 2004, and in 2010, he was selected by his fellow Republicans as their choice for the next Senate President Pro Tem. Berger was officially elected president Pro Tem when the legislature opened on January 26, 2011.

In the 2026 Republican primary for the 26th district's seat, Berger lost reelection to county sheriff Sam Page by 23 votes.

== Early life and education ==
Berger was born in New Rochelle, New York. He graduated from George Washington High School in Danville, Virginia, in 1970 and studied briefly at Danville Community College. Berger earned a bachelor's degree in sociology from Averett College in 1980 and a J.D. degree from Wake Forest University School of Law in 1982, after which he entered law practice.

== North Carolina Senate ==
Berger was first elected to the North Carolina Senate in 2000. He was Senate Minority Leader from 2005 to 2011. In 2011, he became Senate President pro tempore.

=== Voting rights ===
In 2016, Berger supported voter ID legislation. The Fourth Circuit Court of Appeals deemed the laws to "target African Americans with almost surgical precision in an opinion written by Diana Motz, an appointee of President Bill Clinton. Berger criticized the ruling as a "decision by three partisan Democrats."

In 2017, the Supreme Court chose not to take up the case, allowing the lower court's decision to stand.

In 2018, a referendum for a Constitutional amendment was approved by a majority of voters. Berger voted to pass legislation that would enroll the amendment later in the year during a lame-duck session.

In 2019, a North Carolina judge offered an opinion that the General Assembly was illegally constituted and unable to make law. However, the Governor enrolled the amendment, which remains a portion of the Constitution. Further court proceedings were underway as of 2019.

During the COVID-19 pandemic, Berger led Republican opposition to North Carolina Board of Elections recommendations to make voting by mail easier.

=== Stripping powers from Governor and Attorney General ===
After the 2024 elections when Democratic candidates won the races for Governor and Attorney General and Republicans lost their supermajority in the North Carolina legislature, North Carolina Republicans in the legislature passed a sweeping bill to strip the state’s incoming Democratic governor and attorney general of key powers. The bill also gave the power to appoint members to the state's election board to the state auditor, a position won by a Republican candidate. Governor Roy Cooper criticized the bill as a "power grab". Berger, however, defended the bill, saying it is "all within the rules that we have".

=== 2026 primary loss ===
In the 2026 Republican primary for the 26th district's seat, Berger trailed his opponent, Sam Page, by a margin of two votes as of March 4. Berger trailed challenger Sam Page by 23 votes following the official canvass, with a recount expected. On March 24, Berger conceded the race.

== Personal life ==
He is married to Patricia Hays; they have three children, Philip Jr., Kevin, and Ashley, as well as four grandchildren.

North Carolina Senate
Preceded by Patrick J. Ballantine	Minority Leader of the North Carolina Senate; 2005–2011	Succeeded by Martin Nesbitt
Preceded by Marc Basnight	President pro tempore of the North Carolina Senate; 2011–present	Incumbent
