= North Carolina Green Party =

North Carolina affiliate of the Green Party

- Chairperson: Co-Chairs; Wayne Turner vacant
- Founded: November 1, 2005; 21 years ago
- Headquarters: 146 Robert Alston Jr. Dr., Pittsboro, NC 27312
- Membership (2026): ▲5,067
- Ideology: Ecosocialism; Green politics Populism; Progressivism
- Political position: Left-wing
- National affiliation: Green Party
- Colors: Green
- Statewide Executive Offices: 0 / 10
- Seats in the North Carolina Senate: 0 / 50
- Seats in the North Carolina House of Representatives: 0 / 120

Website
- ncgreenparty.org

The North Carolina Green Party is a political party in the state of North Carolina, and the NC affiliate of the Green Party of the United States. It has officially qualified for ballot access as of 27 March 2018, until 2020 statewide election. Since 2006, it has worked in collaboration with other organizations seeking to reform state election laws.

The state party has five chapters, which are located in the Charlotte, Triad, and Triangle metropolitan areas and the Eastern and Western areas of the state.

It is listed in The A to Z of the Green Movement, which was published in 2007.

The party ran four candidates in November, 2018, including state legislative and congressional races.

In August 2022, the North Carolina State Board of Elections voted to recognize the North Carolina Green Party as an official party in the state.

== Before 2025 ==
On August 18, 2017, the Party voiced support for removing Confederate monuments and statues of Robert E. Lee., in response to a recent Ku Klux Klan rally and counter protest in Durham resulting in a General Lee statue being torn down by vandals.

On August 23, 2018, the NC Green Party endorsed the 2018 National Prison Strike.

On June 30, 2022, the North Carolina State Board of Elections rejected certifying the North Carolina Green Party on a 3–2 vote among partisan lines. The party had enough verified signatures to be certified as a political party in North Carolina. The party had collected over 22,000 signatures, with just less than 16,000 signatures being verified. This is more than the 13,865 signatures needed to be on the ballot. However, several county boards of elections claimed they found apparent fraud and irregularities while examining the petitions. This resulted in the State Board launching an investigation against the North Carolina Green Party. The Board claimed to have discovered various irregularities in the investigation such as voters signing more than one petition, voters claiming to have never signed the petitions, and similar handwriting among signatures. The North Carolina Green Party had hired contractors from Michigan that were under investigation for invalid petitions in that state. This led to five of the ten gubernatorial candidates being removed from the ballot in Michigan. The investigation led to the State Board of Elections refusing to certify the party.

The North Carolina Green Party claimed that the State Board of Elections had acted very undemocratically and unethically. One of the contractors from Michigan the party hired, First Choice Contracting, had only collected less than 100 signatures before terminating the contract and received a refund. Furthermore, the Green Party had evidence of the Democratic Senatorial Campaign Committee harassing signers multiple times asking if they want their signatures to be removed from the petition. The callers would claim to either be from the DSCC, not disclose who they were with, or even impersonate members of the Green Party. The DSCC confirmed that they are calling voters to ensure that they have not been deceived. During their party’s meeting with the State Board, the party’s attorney questioned the board on whether the signatures that were disputed would be enough to invalidate the party. The board did not clearly answer the question and their attorney was muted for supposedly acting out of order. The party also claimed that the board failed to provide any evidence for their claims. The reason why there was not an investigation into the callers was that they were protected under free speech and that the calls are part of the political process. In response to the board’s decision, the North Carolina Green Party had filed a lawsuit against the state board of elections on July 14, 2022, to be certified on the ballot.

On August 1, the State Board of Elections reversed their decision by a unanimous vote to certify the Green Party on the ballot. As the decision was ruled after the July 1st deadline, it remained unclear whether the party would have its candidates printed on the ballot. The Democratic Party filed a lawsuit to prevent the Green Party from being on the ballot as a response to the Board’s decision. On August 8, Judge James Dever III ruled in favor of the North Carolina Green Party by declaring the Democratic Party’s suit as moot, resulting in the State Board of Elections being required to print the names of Green Party candidates on the ballot. The Green Party was certified as the judge ruled that the plaintiffs did not have a basis in fact or law. This also led the NC Democratic Party, led by the Elias Law Group, to file an emergency motion believing that it would cause irreparable harm to the Democratic Party by forcing the party to divide its resources that would be of better use for other purposes. The appeal was dismissed on August 11.

On April 2, 2024, U.S. District Court Judge James C. Devers III ruled that the Democratic Senatorial Campaign Committee and the North Carolina Democratic Party was required to pay $6,525 to the Green Party's attorneys as he determined that the actions of both bodies were deemed “frivolous, unreasonable, and without foundation.”

== Personnel ==
The former chair of the party was Doug Stuber. In 2000, Stuber ran Ralph Nader's Green Party presidential campaign. As of 2026, the co chair is Wayne Turner and the other co chair position is vacant.

== Electoral history ==
=== Presidential elections ===
The party ran a write-in campaign for former Georgia Congresswoman Cynthia McKinney for U.S. president in 2008. As only 158 votes for McKinney were reported, the party questioned the counting of the votes and if all were counted.

In 2016, the party came close to gaining statewide ballot access, closer than the other six new parties, but still fell short of getting the required number of signatures. The party, in collaboration with the Stein/Baraka presidential campaign, helped garner more write-in votes for Jill Stein than any presidential write-in candidate has ever received in North Carolina.

=== Local elections ===
In 2010, Richard Allen Weir (now known as Rachel Alayna Weir) of Pitt County ran as a Green write-in candidate for United States Senate.

In 2013, Michael Zytkow ran for the Charlotte City Council seat representing District 4 as an independent with the Green Party's endorsement. Zytkow garnered 33% of the vote.

On June 22, 2017, the Western chapter of the party endorsed Dee Williams for Asheville City Council

In June 2018, NCGP nominated Keenen Altic to run in the Forsyth County Commissioner At-Large race and he accepted choosing to run as a Green. 'Speaking of his first time running in politics and the first time the Green Party has run in Forsyth County, Altic said, “Having 4,500 or more votes demonstrates that there is a certain viability to our message. We have at least 4,500 or more potential socialists ready to organize.”' At 4,756 votes he received 3.5% of the vote in a three-way race. Altic's campaign distributed about 5,000 leaflets and candidate cards.

== See also ==
- List of State Green Parties
- North Carolina Libertarian Party
- North Carolina Socialist Party
- Constitution Party of North Carolina
- Political party strength in North Carolina
- Politics of North Carolina
- Government of North Carolina
- Elections in North Carolina
- Law of North Carolina
- List of politics by U.S. state
