= Libertarian Party of North Carolina =

State affiliate of the Libertarian Party

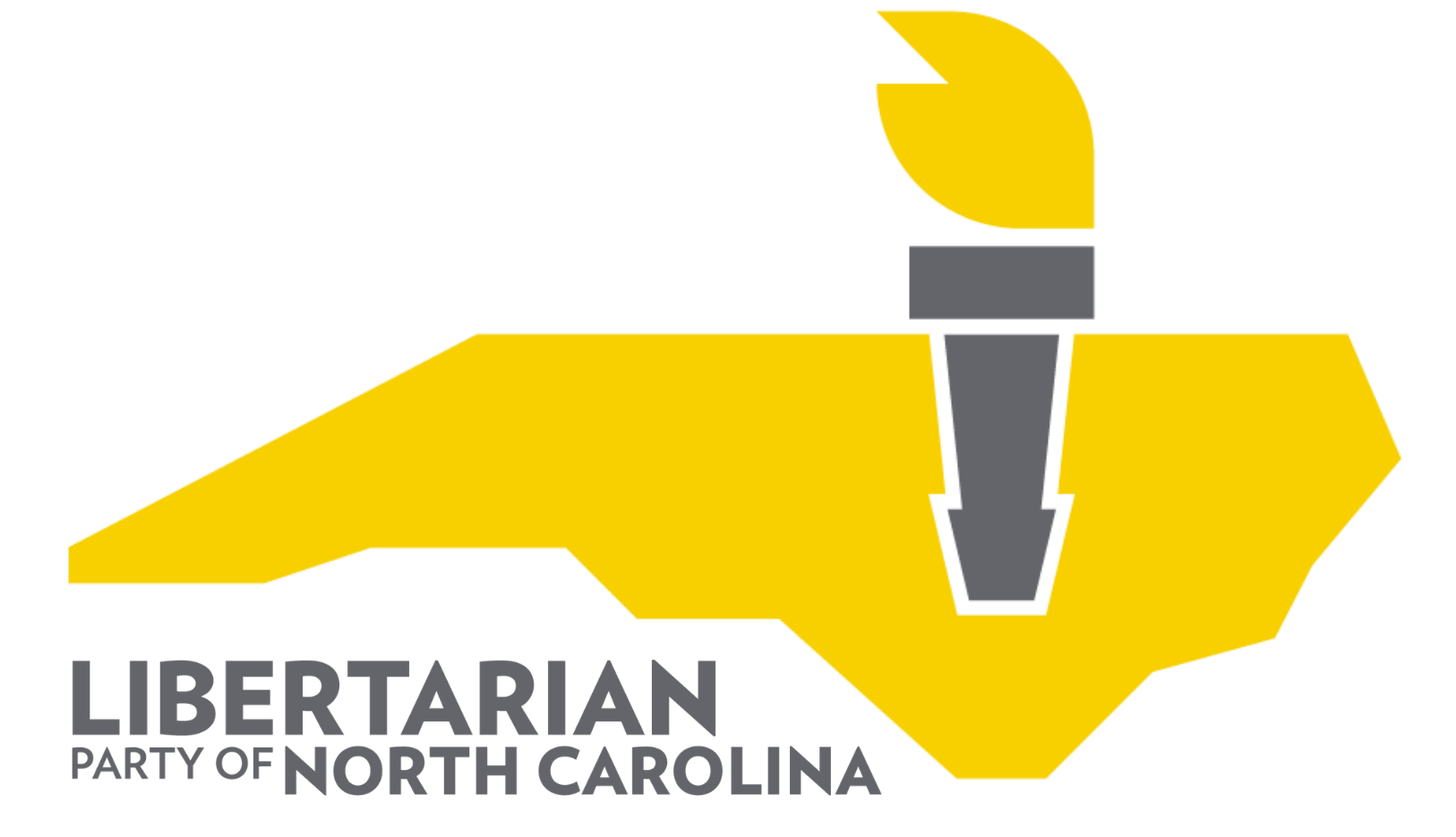
- Chairperson: Ryan Brown
- Senate leader: None
- House leader: None
- Founded: 1975
- Headquarters: Raleigh
- Membership (2026): ▲46,711
- Ideology: Libertarianism
- National affiliation: Libertarian Party (United States)
- Colors: Gold
- North Carolina Senate: 0 / 50
- North Carolina House of Representatives: 0 / 120
- U.S. Senate (North Carolina): 0 / 2
- U.S. House of Representatives (North Carolina): 0 / 14
- Other elected officials: 0 (June 2024)

Website
- www.lpnc.org

The Libertarian Party of North Carolina (LPNC) is the North Carolina affiliate of the Libertarian Party.

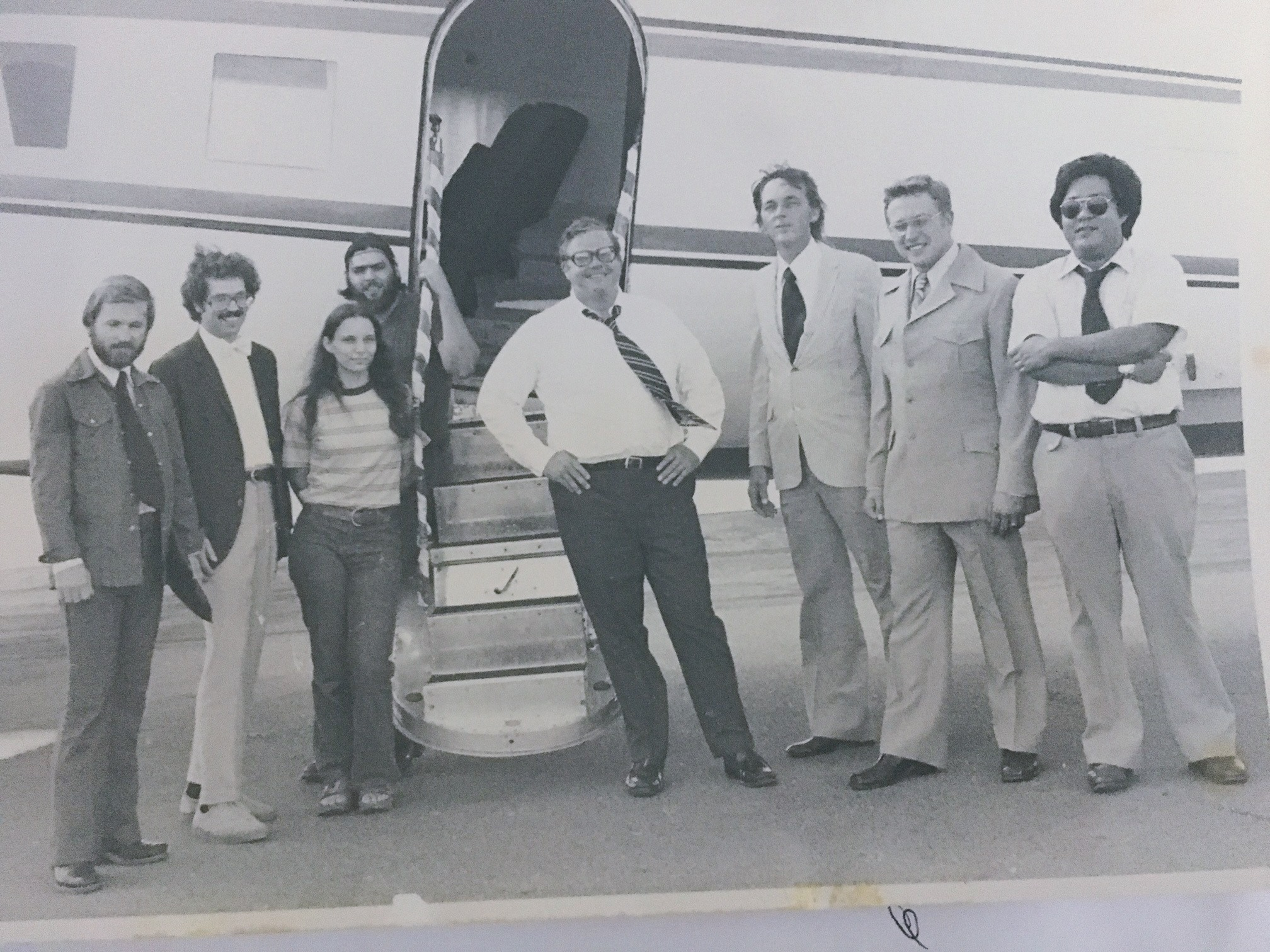
The entire 1976 N.C. Libertarian ticket: Arlan Andrews (far left), candidate for governor; Roger McBride (center), presidential candidate; Carl Wagle (third from right), 5th district Congressional candidate; and Andrew Eiva (second from right, aide-de-camp to Andrews. The others are unidentified. (Photo Courtesy Arlan Andrews)

== Organization ==
Members of the executive committee are elected biannually at conventions to carry out the essential functions of a political party.

- State Chair: Ryan Brown
- Vice Chair: Bob Drach
- Treasurer: Barbara Howe
- Secretary: Kate Shawhan
- Members at Large:
  - Mac Browder
  - Nick Taylor
  - Bryce Acer
  - Angela Humphries

The party also maintains active local organizations in over two dozen counties and on half a dozen college campuses. LPNC may also be the only party in U.S. history that had an Indian Nation as an active local affiliate, the Eastern Band of Cherokee Indians.

== Party platform ==
The most recent platform of the Libertarian Party of North Carolina was adopted at the party's convention on March 6, 2022.

The Libertarian Party of North Carolina follows the national party's platform with certain planks tailored to state-specific issues such as advocating for the abolition of the North Carolina ABC and the North Carolina Education Lottery along with a liberalization of laws to allow private actors to compete in these spaces. The party supports efforts to greatly expand ballot access in the state for both organized parties and individual independents and has partnered with the Green Party of North Carolina to sue both the Federal Election Commission and the State of North Carolina in efforts to improve access to debates and elections.

== Recent election results ==
=== 2020 elections ===
==== Gubernatorial election ====
2020 North Carolina gubernatorial election
Party	Candidate	Votes	%	±%
Democratic	Roy Cooper (incumbent)	2,834,790	51.5%	+2.5%
Republican	Dan Forest	2,586,605	47.0%	−1.8%
Libertarian	Steven J. DiFiore	60,449	1.1%	−1.1%
Constitution	Al Pisano	20,934	0.4%	N/A
Total votes		5,502,778	100%	N/A
Turnout		5,545,847	75.4%	
Registered electors		7,359,798		
Democratic hold				

==== United States Senate election ====
2020 United States Senate election in North Carolina
Party	Candidate	Votes	%	±%
Republican	Thom Tillis (incumbent)	2,665,598	48.7%	N/A
Democratic	Cal Cunningham	2,569,965	46.9%	−N/A
Libertarian	Shannon Bray	171,571	3.1%	−0.6%
Constitution	Kevin E. Hayes	67,818	1.2%	N/A
Total votes		5,474,952	100%	
Republican hold				

=== 2022 elections ===
==== United States Senate election ====
2022 United States Senate election in North Carolina
Party	Candidate	Votes	%	±%
Republican	Ted Budd	1,905,786	50.50%	−0.56%
Democratic	Cheri Beasley	1,784,049	47.27%	+1.90%
Libertarian	Shannon W. Bray	51,640	1.37%	−2.20%
Green	Matthew Hoh	29,934	0.79%	N/A
Write-in		2,515	0.07%	N/A
Total votes		3,773,924	100.0%	
Republican hold				

== Electoral history ==
In 1992, Libertarian candidate for Governor Scott Earle McLaughlin achieved 4.1 percent of the popular vote in a fully contested race, with 104,983 votes. This remains the highest percentage gained by a third party candidate for that office by any party in North Carolina since that year.

In the 2008 elections, Michael Munger running as the party's candidate for Governor of North Carolina, received 121,585 votes for 2.9% of the total vote.

Also in 2008, Chris Cole, running as the party's candidate for US Senate, received 133,430 votes for 3.1% of the total vote.

== Related ==
- List of State Libertarian Parties
- North Carolina Green Party
- Constitution Party of North Carolina
