= Constitution Party of North Carolina =

North Carolina affiliate of the Constitution Party

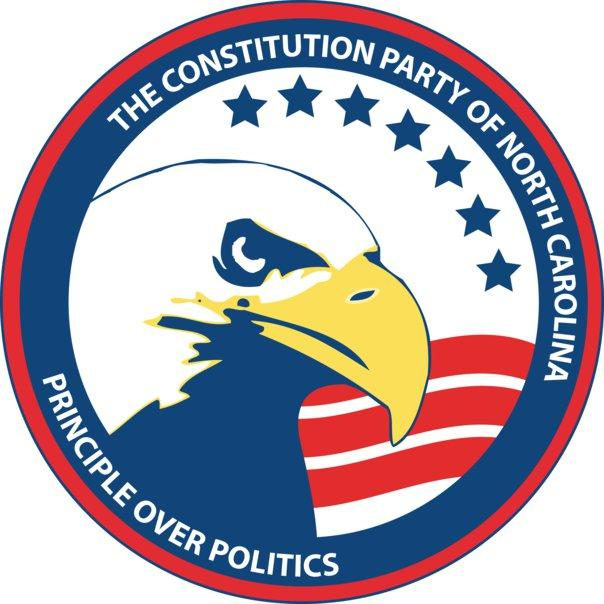
- Chairperson: Al Pisano
- Founded: 2008
- Headquarters: 7209-J East W.T. Harris Blvd. #119, Charlotte, NC 28227 (888) 683-2762
- Membership (2025): ▲738
- Ideology: Paleoconservatism, Classical liberalism, Fiscal conservatism, Social conservatism
- Political position: Right-wing
- National affiliation: Constitution Party
- Colors: Red, white, and blue

Website
- constitutionpartync.com

Constitution Party of North Carolina is the North Carolina affiliate of the Constitution Party. It was founded in 2008 out of a former NC Chapter of the Constitution Party. The Party's chairman is Al Pisano who was first elected to the position in 2008 as the State Party's first chairman and was re-elected in 2010 for an additional two year term.

== Overview ==
The Party was started in 2008 out of a former Party organization by founder's Al Pisano, Jordon M. Greene and Bryan E. Greene on August 29, 2008. The party was formed to give people with paleoconservative and classical liberal views an alternative voice, and to remain true to its principles through its setup with Seven Essential Core Values. The Party terms these Seven Essential Core Values as the Sanctity of Life, Religious Freedom, Traditional Family, Private Property Rights, Pro-Second Amendment, National Sovereignty and Anti-Socialism. The Party also claims to be the state's only true 100% Pro-Life political party.

== Presidential tickets ==
- 1992 - Howard Phillips and Albion Knight, Jr.
- 1996 - Howard Phillips and Herb Titus
- 2000 - Howard Phillips and Curtis Frazier
- 2004 - Michael Peroutka and Chuck Baldwin
- 2008 - Chuck Baldwin and Darrell Castle
- 2012 - Virgil Goode and Jim Clymer
- 2016 - Darrell Castle and Scott Bradley
- 2020 - Don Blankenship and William Mohr
- 2024 - Randall Terry and Stephen Broden

== Endorsed state candidates ==
2012

Kevin E. Hayes - NC State House, District 4 - 1,053 votes (3.36%)

== Electoral history ==
2011

- David Waddell, Town Council Indian Trail, North Carolina

Tendered his resignation January 2014, effective 31st January 2014, in Klingon.

2018

- David W. Fallin - US House of Representatives in North Carolina, District 7 - 4,599 votes (1.28%)
- Stuart Andrew Collins - NC State Senate, District 37 - 1,290 votes (1.94%)
- Kevin E. Hayes - NC State House, District 4 - 480 votes (2.24%)
- Mark A. Crowe - NC State House, District 42 - 437 votes (2.56%)
- Allen Poindexter- NC State House, District 90 - 1,333 votes (4.98%)
- Greg Holt- Craven County Commissioner - 1,231 votes (22.81%)
- Jerry R. Jones- Greene County Commissioner - 3,232 votes (52.47%) (Winner)
- Peggy Lanier- Pender County Commissioner - 6,959 votes (36.94%)
- Tony Keech Jr.- Beaufort County Sheriff - 2,818 votes (14.95%)

2020

- Kevin Hayes- US Senate in North Carolina- 67,818 votes (1.24%)
- Jeff Gregory - US House of Representatives in North Carolina, District 5 - 7,555 votes (2.0%)
- Al Pisano- NC Governor - 20,934 votes (0.38%)
- Chris Cole- NC Senate, District 41, 32,295 (28.1%)

== Ballot access ==
The party managed to get official write-in status for its candidate in 2012.

On June 6, 2018, The Bipartisan State Board of Elections and Ethics Enforcement unanimously voted to recognize the party, which allowed the party to nominate candidates for the 2018 elections. The party had collected 12,651 valid signatures, which was more than the needed 11,925 required signatures under the Electoral Freedom Act of 2017. They were also able to collect over 200 signatures in at least three congressional districts.

On July 20, 2018, the party filed a lawsuit against the state board of elections regarding SB 486, which prevented candidates who lost their primaries from running as a candidate for another party. The three candidates who filed suit had previously run in both the Democratic and Republican primaries and joined the Constitution Party before the bill became law on June 20. The bill had removed their names from the ballot as a result of the bill. The party argued that the bill violated their First and fourteenth amendment rights.

On August 22, 2018, Judge Louise Flanagan ruled in favor of the Constitution Party as the state had violated the party's first amendment right to free speech and their fourteenth amendment right to due process. The judge ordered all three of the candidates' names to be on the ballot. The case also prevented the state from implementing the law as a result of this case.

In 2021, the state board of elections announced that they would no longer recognize the Constitution Party of North Carolina alongside the North Carolina Green Party for failing to meet the requirements necessary for recognition.

On April 1, 2024, the Constitution Party of North Carolina turned in signatures to the North Carolina State Board of Elections to become a certified party and place their own candidates for the 2024 elections. At the time, the party needed to get 13,865 verified signatures. After collecting the signatures, the party would need to meet with the State Board of Elections before the party can be recognized. The party turned in almost 15,000 valid signatures to the county boards of elections according to the State Board of Elections’ petition page at the time. At that time, the party would have needed to nominate candidates by the July 1 deadline during their party convention if it had been certified. The Chairman, Al Pisano noted that there are challenging legal loopholes the party would need to go through in a short amount of time because of deadlines. He also states that this is the most patriotic thing to do and that they are honoring the soldiers who have given them the right to not be held captive to the establishment parties.

On April 16, the Constitution Party of North Carolina faced a technical snag when it got an email from the state board of elections noting that there was an error in the state board of elections’ petition tracker pulling in the number of verified signatures from the county Boards of Election. The email mentions a statement from the board of elections that the petition tracker “..... is merely an indicator provided for public benefit and does not establish, legally, the status of a petition campaign.” The state board of elections stated that there was an “innocent coding error” on the petition module due to pulling data from the party’s previous efforts to gain recognition, but the old signatures are no longer valid. The board also stated that “...it is the party’s responsibility to ensure they have enough signatures to reach the threshold set in law.” Pisano stated that if they had known about this information earlier, it could have spent the last two weeks collecting the signatures necessary to recover its lost numbers. 2,000 signatures were removed from the petition search due to a "glitch" in the system. The party was given until May 17th at 5 PM to collect and resubmit signatures to the county boards of elections. Since then, the party has been able to reach the threshold once again and has planned to hold a meeting in June to consider ballot access while reviewing the party’s signatures.

On June 26, 2024, the State Board of Elections voted in a 3-2 vote among partisan lines to postpone their decision on whether the Constitution Party (supporting Randall Terry), We The People Party (supporting Robert F. Kennedy Jr.), and Justice For All Party (supporting Cornel West) should be on the ballot. This would mean that they would not be able to place their own candidates for any race in the 2024 elections at the time. The Democratic led board claimed to be concerned about the party’s address being listed as the address of its petition instead of the state chair’s. Board members did take issue that Pisano’s address on the petition sheets were outdated, but Pisano attempted to get clarification from the state board for three years without a response. The party notified the state board that some county boards of elections did not follow the procedures and processes regarding petition drives. The party has sent evidence for every problem that has occurred. The state board also claimed that the Justice For All Party and We The People Party might have tricked voters to sign their petitions. Prior to the meeting, groups tied to the Democratic Party such as Clear Choice Action claimed to have discovered thousands of invalid signatures for the Justice for All Party and a supposed report of a Republican activist stating the party would help Donald Trump win North Carolina for the presidency. The North Carolina Democratic Party also challenged the signatures of the We The People Party for supposedly circumventing the unaffiliated petition requirements by forming a party as the signature requirement for unaffiliated candidates would be approximately 85,000. The state board of elections previously rejected certification of the green party in 2022, but the party won its lawsuits to be placed back on the ballot. On July 1, Congressman Bryan Steil, chair of the U.S. House Administration Committee, and Congressman Jim Jordan, chair of the U.S. House Judiciary Committee, sent a letter to the Chair and Administrator of the North Carolina State Board of Elections requiring them to produce all documents relating to the decision of the Board not to certify the three parties even though they all had enough valid signatures.

Another meeting regarding these parties was held on July 9. Prior to the July 9 meeting, an email was sent to the State Board of Elections by members of the Libertarian Party of North Carolina, North Carolina Forward Party, Veterans Party of North Carolina, We the People Party of North Carolina, Justice for All Party of North Carolina, and Green Party of North Carolina demanding the certification of the three parties in question. On July 9, the Constitution Party of North Carolina was unanimously certified with enough valid signatures to do so while the Justice For All Party and We the People Party faced another delay during the July 9th board meeting. The Constitution Party of North Carolina has been given until July 23 to submit all of its candidate nominations. The party’s candidates include Walter Vinny Smith for governor and Wayne Jones for lieutenant governor. The party also nominated 3 additional candidates in a letter to the State Board, but the party did not want to disclose their names until it was recognized. The party also reserved the right to nominate additional candidates if given additional time. Members of the Republican Party and Justice for All Party were outraged with the decision to delay certification of Justice For All and We The People, citing the rejections and maneuvers to reduce the number of verified signatures as either illegal or politically motivated. There have also been calls from the Libertarian Party of North Carolina for the resignations of the three democratic board members: Alan Hirsch, Siobhan O’Duffy Millen, and Jeff Carmon. The We The People Party would be certified by a 4-1 vote while the Justice For All Party would be rejected by a 3-2 vote during the July 16 State Board of Elections Meeting.

The North Carolina Democratic Party sued the state board of elections on July 26 in an attempt to remove the We The People Party off the ballot, which would be denied on August 12, 2024. The Justice For All Party would go on to file a lawsuit to be secured a spot on the ballot shortly after being rejected. The judge ruled in favor of the Justice For All party on August 13, 2024, citing violations of JFA's first amendment rights.

== See also ==
- North Carolina Libertarian Party
- North Carolina Green Party
