= North Carolina's 117th House district =

American legislative district

North Carolina's 117th State House of Representatives district
Representative
Jennifer Balkcom; R–Hendersonville
- Demographics: 79% White; 3% Black; 13% Hispanic; 1% Asian; 1% Other; 3% Multiracial
- Population (2024): 91,932

North Carolina's 117th House district is one of 120 districts in the North Carolina House of Representatives. It has been represented by Republican Jennifer Balkcom since 2023.

== Geography ==
Since 2005, the district has included part of Henderson County. The district overlaps with the 48th Senate district.

== District officeholders since 2003 ==
Representative	Party	Dates	Notes	Counties
District created January 1, 2003.				2003–2005; Parts of Henderson and Transylvania counties.
Carolyn Justus (Hendersonville)	Republican	January 1, 2003 – January 1, 2011	Redistricted from the 50th district. Retired.	2003–2005; Parts of Henderson and Transylvania counties.
Carolyn Justus (Hendersonville)	Republican	January 1, 2003 – January 1, 2011	Redistricted from the 50th district. Retired.	2005–Present; Part of Henderson County.
Chuck McGrady (Hendersonville)	Republican	January 1, 2011 – October 5, 2020	Retired and resigned early.	2005–Present; Part of Henderson County.
Vacant		October 5, 2020 – October 12, 2020		2005–Present; Part of Henderson County.
Tim Moffitt (Hendersonville)	Republican	October 12, 2020 – January 1, 2023	Appointed to finish McGrady's term. Retired to run for State Senate.	2005–Present; Part of Henderson County.
Jennifer Balkcom (Hendersonville)	Republican	January 1, 2023 – Present		2005–Present; Part of Henderson County.

== Election results ==
=== 2026 ===
North Carolina House of Representatives 117th district Republican primary election, 2026
Party	Candidate	Votes	%
Republican	Jennifer Balkcom (incumbent)	5,974	76.17%
Republican	Christopher Lamar Wilson	1,869	23.83%
Total votes		7,843	100%

North Carolina House of Representatives 117th district general election, 2026
Party	Candidate	Votes	%
Republican	Jennifer Balkcom (incumbent)		
Democratic	Lynne Russo		
Total votes			100%

=== 2024 ===
North Carolina House of Representatives 117th district general election, 2024
Party	Candidate	Votes	%
Republican	Jennifer Balkcom (incumbent)	30,603	57.75%
Democratic	Steve Martinez	22,390	42.25%
Total votes		52,993	100%
Republican hold			

=== 2022 ===
North Carolina House of Representatives 117th district Republican primary election, 2022
Party	Candidate	Votes	%
Republican	Jennifer Balkcom	5,599	42.58%
Republican	Chelsea Walsh	5,441	41.38%
Republican	Dennis Justice	2,110	16.05%
Total votes		13,150	100%

North Carolina House of Representatives 117th district general election, 2022
Party	Candidate	Votes	%
Republican	Jennifer Balkcom	24,144	58.96%
Democratic	Michael Greer O'Shea	16,806	41.04%
Total votes		40,950	100%
Republican hold			

=== 2020 ===
North Carolina House of Representatives 117th district Democratic primary election, 2020
Party	Candidate	Votes	%
Democratic	Josh Remillard	4,883	54.21%
Democratic	Danae Aicher	4,124	45.79%
Total votes		9,007	100%

North Carolina House of Representatives 117th district Republican primary election, 2020
Party	Candidate	Votes	%
Republican	Tim Moffitt	8,713	79.44%
Republican	Dennis Justice	2,255	20.56%
Total votes		10,968	100%

North Carolina House of Representatives 117th district general election, 2020
Party	Candidate	Votes	%
Republican	Tim Moffitt (incumbent)	29,087	60.63%
Democratic	Josh Remillard	18,887	39.37%
Total votes		47,974	100%
Republican hold			

=== 2018 ===
North Carolina House of Representatives 117th district general election, 2018
Party	Candidate	Votes	%
Republican	Chuck McGrady (incumbent)	20,596	60.06%
Democratic	Gayle Kemp	13,699	39.94%
Total votes		34,295	100%
Republican hold			

=== 2016 ===
North Carolina House of Representatives 117th district general election, 2016
Party	Candidate	Votes	%
Republican	Chuck McGrady (incumbent)	30,659	100%
Total votes		30,659	100%
Republican hold			

=== 2014 ===
North Carolina House of Representatives 117th district Republican primary election, 2014
Party	Candidate	Votes	%
Republican	Chuck McGrady (incumbent)	4,815	61.70%
Republican	Ronnie Edwards	2,989	38.30%
Total votes		7,804	100%

North Carolina House of Representatives 117th district general election, 2014
Party	Candidate	Votes	%
Republican	Chuck McGrady (incumbent)	17,292	74.76%
Libertarian	Shelby Mood	5,838	25.24%
Total votes		23,130	100%
Republican hold			

=== 2012 ===
North Carolina House of Representatives 117th district Republican primary election, 2012
Party	Candidate	Votes	%
Republican	Chuck McGrady (incumbent)	6,481	57.34%
Republican	Roger Snyder	4,822	42.66%
Total votes		11,303	100%

North Carolina House of Representatives 117th district general election, 2012
Party	Candidate	Votes	%
Republican	Chuck McGrady (incumbent)	26,217	100%
Total votes		26,217	100%
Republican hold			

=== 2010 ===
North Carolina House of Representatives 117th district general election, 2010
Party	Candidate	Votes	%
Republican	Chuck McGrady	20,331`	100%
Total votes		20,331	100%
Republican hold			

=== 2008 ===
North Carolina House of Representatives 117th district general election, 2008
Party	Candidate	Votes	%
Republican	Carolyn Justus (incumbent)	23,277	60.34%
Democratic	Paul D. Goebel	15,300	39.66%
Total votes		38,577	100%
Republican hold			

=== 2006 ===
North Carolina House of Representatives 117th district Republican primary election, 2006
Party	Candidate	Votes	%
Republican	Carolyn Justus (incumbent)	6,818	75.01%
Republican	C. Shannon Baldwin	2,271	24.99%
Total votes		9.089	100%

North Carolina House of Representatives 117th district general election, 2006
Party	Candidate	Votes	%
Republican	Carolyn Justus (incumbent)	16,783	67.48%
Democratic	Gordon Hoots	8,088	32.52%
Total votes		24,871	100%
Republican hold			

=== 2004 ===
North Carolina House of Representatives 117th district general election, 2004
Party	Candidate	Votes	%
Republican	Carolyn Justus (incumbent)	21,650	68.17%
Democratic	Wayne Bastedo	10,111	31.83%
Total votes		31,761	100%
Republican hold			

=== 2002 ===
North Carolina House of Representatives 117th district general election, 2002
Party	Candidate	Votes	%
Republican	Larry Justus (incumbent) (Note: Re-elected posthumously.)	17,043	89.00%
Libertarian	Brian Barber	2,107	11.00%
Total votes		19,150	100%
Republican hold			
