= Senator Apodaca =

Senator Apodaca may refer to:

- Jerry Apodaca (1934–2023), New Mexico State Senate
- Tom Apodaca (born 1957), North Carolina State Senate
