= Jennifer Balkcom =

American politician

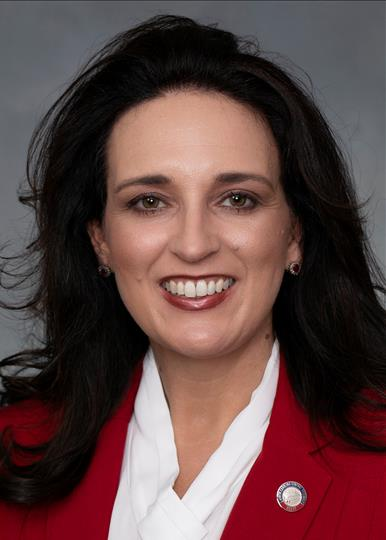
- Official portrait, 2023

Member of the North Carolina House of Representatives from the 117th district
- Incumbent
- Assumed office January 1, 2023
- Preceded by: Tim Moffitt

Personal details
- Born: 1978 or 1979 (age 46–47)
- Party: Republican (2016–present)
- Other political affiliations: Libertarian (2002–2005); Democratic (2005–2016)
- Spouse: Clint
- Children: 1
- Education: Blue Ridge Community College (AA)
- Website: State House website; Campaign website

Jennifer Capps Balkcom (born 1978 or 1979) is an American politician serving as a member of the North Carolina House of Representatives for the 117th district since 2023. She was the Republican nominee for North Carolina's 11th congressional district in 2026, losing to democrat Jamie Ager by roughly 15 percentage points.

== Early life and education ==
Balkcom was born in 1978 or 1979. She graduated from Blue Ridge Community College with an associate degree in applied science and business administration.

== Career ==
=== Early career ===
Balkcom has worked in the financial industry since 1998 and works as a mortgage loan officer for ALCOVA as of August 2026. Before being elected to the North Carolina House of Representatives, she was active in many local nonprofits, was a member of the Henderson County planning board, and served on the board of the AdventHealth Foundation.

=== North Carolina House of Representatives ===
On December 13, 2021, Balkcom announced that she would run for the North Carolina House of Representatives in the 117th district, seeking to succeed Tim Moffitt, who ran for the North Carolina Senate seeking to succeed Chuck Edwards. She narrowly won the Republican primary on May 17, 2022, receiving 42.6% of the vote, and defeated Democratic nominee Michael O'Shea in the general election with 59.0% of the vote.

=== 2026 congressional campaign ===
In August 2026, after U.S. representative Chuck Edwards announced that he would withdraw his nomination in the 2026 election, Balkcom applied to seek the replacement nomination. She was nominated by the North Carolina Republican Party on August 10.

== Political positions ==
=== Agriculture ===
During her 2022 state representative campaign, Balkcom supported preserving North Carolina farmland, which she said was being lost to commercial, industrial, and residential over-development.

In February 2025, Balkcom supported a bill that would prohibit banks from denying services to agriculture producers based on their greenhouse gas emissions or use of fossil fuel-derived products or machinery. In April 2025, she introduced legislation banning adversarial foreign governments from acquiring or leasing agricultural land in North Carolina.

=== Crime and policing ===
During her 2022 state representative campaign, Balkcom blamed gun violence and crime on a "much deeper problems we have in this country, including the breakdown of the family, and devaluation of innocent human life". She also criticized calls to defund the police.

=== Economic issues ===
During her 2022 state representative campaign, Balkcom supported deregulation and cutting or eliminating the state's income tax to address inflation.

=== Education ===
In April 2025, Balkcom co-sponsored a bill that would allow parents to sue schools alleging violations of the state's Parents' Bill of Rights, which prohibits gender identity from being taught in grades K-4 and requires parents to be notified if their children want to use a different name or pronoun in school. The Promoting Wholesome Content for Students bill was also introduced the same month, of which Balkcom is a co-sponsor. The bill seeks to remove books, films, and other media deemed inappropriate from school libraries and enables citizens to sue school districts that do not comply for civil damages.

During her 2026 state representative campaign, Balkcom opposed teaching about race in schools and supported providing education vouchers to charter schools.

=== Gun policy ===
Balkcom supports the Second Amendment to the United States Constitution and opposes gun control.

=== Healthcare ===
Balkcom opposed expanding North Carolina's Medicaid program, telling Hendersonville Times-News that it makes "no sense to add tens of millions of able-bodied childless adults to Medicaid, which is what expansion entails" and questioning how the state would be able to pay for Medicaid expansion.

In March 2025, she introduced a bill titled the "Parents' Medical Bill of Rights", which would repeal laws that allow children to consent to the treatment of sexually transmitted diseases, pregnancy, mental health, and substance abuse without their parents' consent. She also introduced another bill that would allow parents to opt their children out of immunizations for "conscientious objection" reasons.

=== Immigration ===
During her 2022 state representative campaign, Balkcom wrote on her campaign website, "criminal illegal aliens must serve their full sentences then be deported". In April 2025, she co-sponsored legislation that would require the North Carolina Department of Health and Human Services, North Carolina Department of Commerce, housing agencies, state public universities, and unemployment services to ask applicants for their immigration status before providing benefits and social services to North Carolina residents.

=== Social issues ===
Balkcom is pro-life. In May 2023, she supported a bill to ban abortions past 12 weeks gestation and require individuals seeking an abortion to receive pre-procedure counseling in-person and to wait 72 hours before returning to their provider for the procedure. In June 2023, Balkcom voted to override Governor Roy Cooper's veto on a bill banning abortions past 12 weeks gestation, with exceptions for rape and incest up to 20 weeks and up to 24 weeks for life-limiting fetal anomalies.

In April 2023, Balkcom supported a bill banning transgender female athletes from competing on girls' sports teams in schools. In 2025, she introduced a bill that would require public school students on overnight field trips to share sleeping quarters with members of their biological sex unless parents have consented or the students are immediate family members; require school districts to make a list of book titles available to the public and allow parents to block their children from borrowing specific books; and prohibit state funds from being used to support prisoners seeking gender-affirming care. The bill passed and became law after the North Carolina General Assembly overrode Governor Josh Stein's veto of the bill.

== Personal life ==
Balkcom is married to her husband, Clint. Together, they have a son and live near Naples, North Carolina. They attend religious services at Hendersonville First Baptist Church. In 2026, it was reported that Balkcom had previously been a member of the Libertarian Party from 2002 to 2005, then a Democrat from 2005 until 2016, when she became a Republican.
