= Tim Moffitt =

American politician

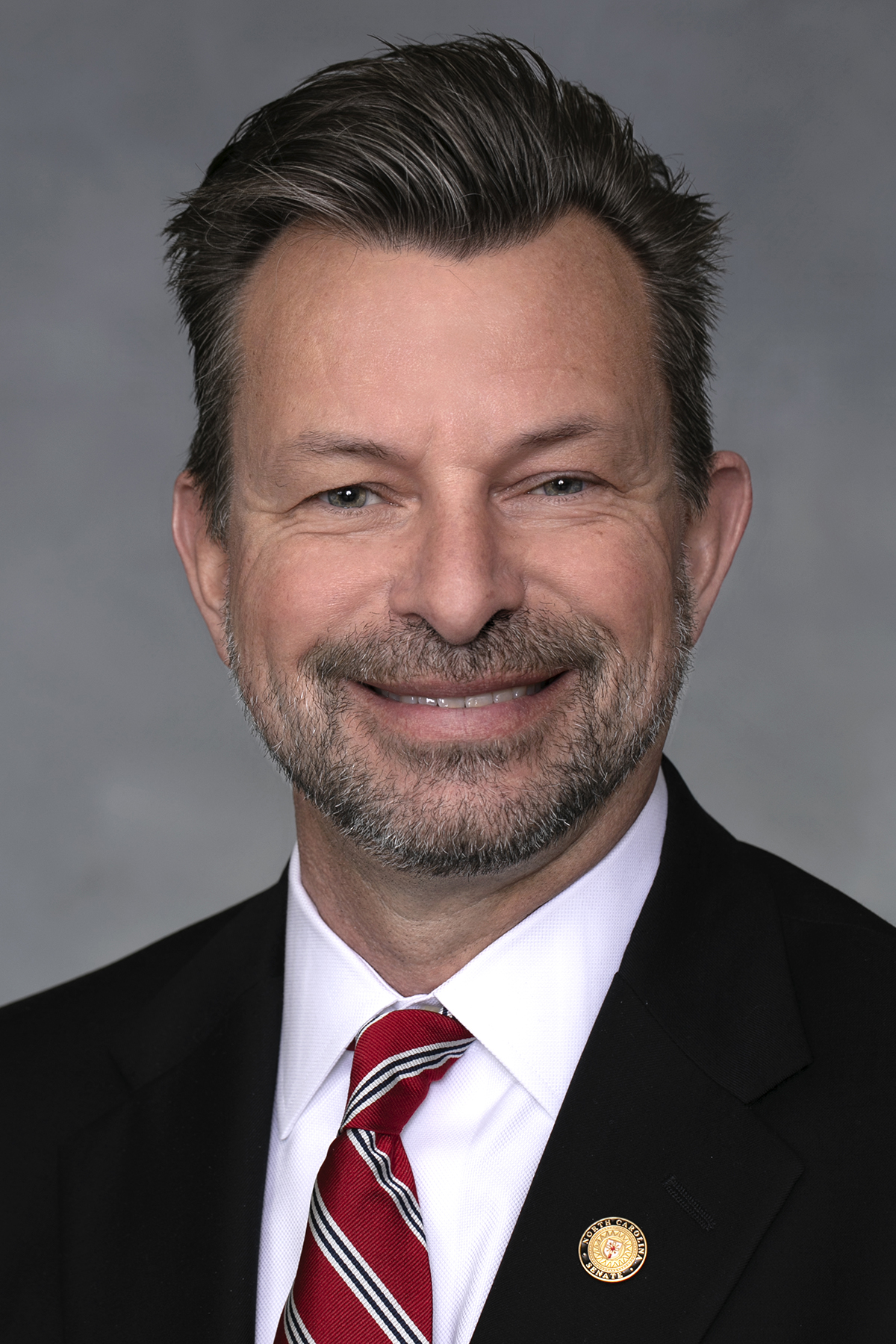
- Official portrait, 2023

Member of the North Carolina Senate from the 48th district
- Incumbent
- Assumed office January 1, 2023
- Preceded by: Chuck Edwards

Member of the North Carolina House of Representatives
- In office October 12, 2020 – January 1, 2023
- Preceded by: Chuck McGrady
- Succeeded by: Jennifer Balkcom
- Constituency: 117th district
- In office January 1, 2011 – January 1, 2015
- Preceded by: Jane Whilden
- Succeeded by: Brian Turner
- Constituency: 116th district

Personal details
- Born: Timothy Douglas Moffitt; 1963 or 1964 (age 61–62) Asheville, North Carolina, U.S.
- Party: Republican
- Website: State Senate website Campaign website

Timothy Douglas Moffitt (born 1964/1965) is a Republican member of the North Carolina Senate who has represented the 48th district since 2023. He was previously in the North Carolina House of Representatives representing the 117th district from 2020 to 2023 and the 116th district from 2011 to 2015.

== Electoral history ==
=== 2024 ===
North Carolina Senate 48th district general election, 2024
Party	Candidate	Votes	%
Republican	Tim Moffitt	73,373	63.93%
Democratic	Chris Walters	41,399	36.07%
Total votes		114,772	100%
Republican hold			

=== 2022 ===
North Carolina Senate 48th district general election, 2022
Party	Candidate	Votes	%
Republican	Tim Moffitt	54,223	64.79%
Democratic	Jay Carey	29,466	35.21%
Total votes		83,689	100%
Republican hold			

=== 2020 ===
North Carolina House of Representatives 117th district Republican primary election, 2020
Party	Candidate	Votes	%
Republican	Tim Moffitt	8,713	79.44%
Republican	Dennis Justice	2,255	20.56%
Total votes		10,968	100%

North Carolina House of Representatives 117th district general election, 2020
Party	Candidate	Votes	%
Republican	Tim Moffitt (incumbent)	29,087	60.63%
Democratic	Josh Remillard	18,887	39.37%
Total votes		47,974	100%
Republican hold			

=== 2014 ===
North Carolina House of Representatives 116th district general election, 2014
Party	Candidate	Votes	%
Democratic	Brian Turner	13,298	51.91%
Republican	Tim Moffitt (incumbent)	12,321	48.09%
Total votes		25,619	100%
Democratic gain from Republican			

=== 2012 ===
North Carolina House of Representatives 116th district general election, 2012
Party	Candidate	Votes	%
Republican	Tim Moffitt (incumbent)	21,291	56.31%
Democratic	Jane Whilden	16,519	43.69%
Total votes		37,810	100%
Republican hold			

=== 2010 ===
North Carolina House of Representatives 116th district general election, 2010
Party	Candidate	Votes	%
Republican	Tim Moffitt	14,638	55.79%
Democratic	Jane Whilden (incumbent)	11,598	44.21%
Total votes		26,236	100%
Republican gain from Democratic			

=== 2008 ===
North Carolina House of Representatives 116th district general election, 2008
Party	Candidate	Votes	%
Democratic	Jane Whilden	20,019	51.70%
Republican	Tim Moffitt	18,704	48.30%
Total votes		38,723	100%
Democratic gain from Republican			

== Committee assignments ==
=== 2023–2024 ===
- Appropriations on Agriculture, Natural, and Economic Resources
- Commerce and Insurance
- Pensions and Retirement and Aging
- State and Local Government
- Transportation

=== 2021–2022 ===
- Finance
- Health
- Local Government - Land Use, Planning and Development
- Regulatory Reform - Vice Chair
- Alcoholic Beverage Control - Chair
- Transportation

=== 2013–2014 ===
- Commerce and Job Development - Vice Chair
- Finance
- Government
- Rules, Calendar, and Operations of the House
- State Personnel - Vice Chair
- Transportation
- Regulatory Reform - Founding Chair

=== 2011–2012 ===
- Commerce and Job Development - Vice Chair
- Finance
- Government
- Rules, Calendar, and Operations of the House
- State Personnel
- Transportation
