= Madison Cawthorn =

American politician (born 1995)

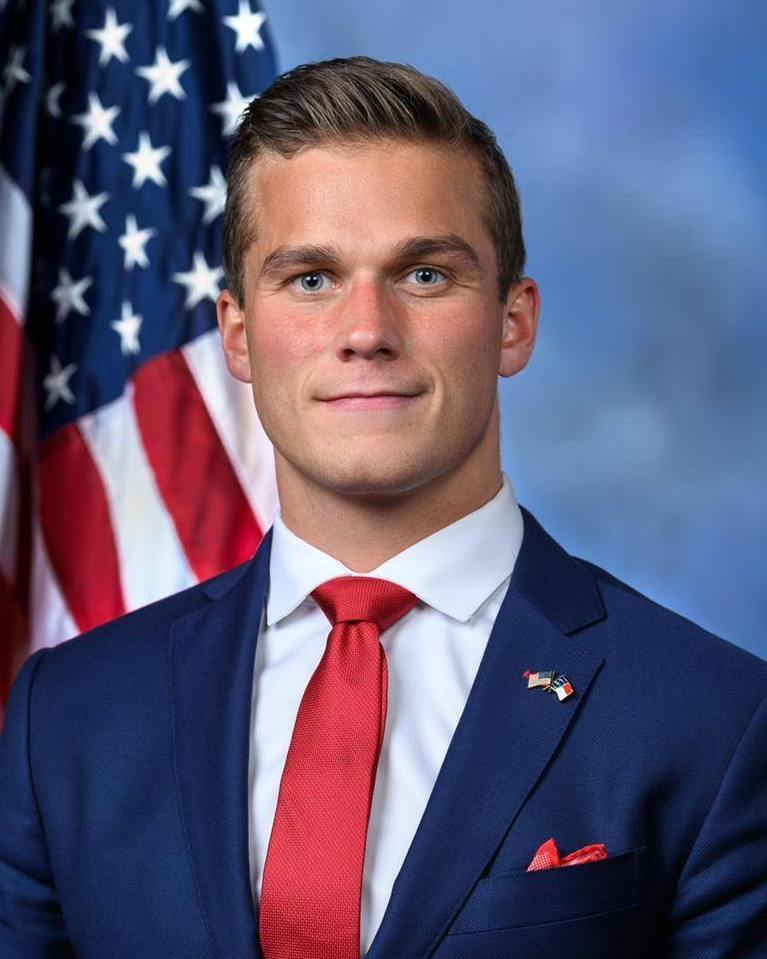
- Official portrait, 2020

Member of the U.S. House of Representatives from North Carolina's 11th district
- In office January 3, 2021 – January 3, 2023
- Preceded by: Mark Meadows
- Succeeded by: Chuck Edwards

Personal details
- Born: David Madison Cawthorn; August 1, 1995 (age 31) Asheville, North Carolina, U.S.
- Party: Republican
- Spouse: Cristina Bayardelle (m. 2020; sep. 2021)
- Cawthorn's voice Cawthorn supporting fellowships for unemployed veterans Recorded May 18, 2021

David Madison Cawthorn (born August 1, 1995) is an American politician who served as the U.S. representative for North Carolina's 11th congressional district from 2021 to 2023. A member of the Republican Party, Cawthorn describes himself as a constitutional conservative.

After working as a staffer for U.S. Representative Mark Meadows, Cawthorn was elected to succeed Meadows in 2020 and became the first member of Congress born in the 1990s. His tenure was marked by various controversies, including allegations of insider trading, improper payments, bringing a handgun to an airport, and appearing in a leaked nude video. Cawthorn lost renomination in the 2022 Republican primary to Chuck Edwards, who won the general election. In 2026, Cawthorn ran for the U.S. House in Florida's 19th congressional district, and finished fourth in the Republican primary.

== Early life and education ==
Cawthorn was born in Asheville, North Carolina, to Priscilla and Roger Cawthorn. He was home-schooled in Hendersonville, North Carolina, through 12th grade, and played football with the Asheville Saints, a league that includes home-schooled high school students. As a teenager, he worked at a Chick-fil-A restaurant.

In 2014, at age 18, Cawthorn was seriously injured while returning from a spring break trip to Florida. He was riding as a passenger in a BMW X3 SUV near Daytona Beach, Florida, when his friend Bradley Ledford fell asleep at the wheel. The vehicle crashed into a concrete barrier while Cawthorn's feet were on the dashboard. In a 2017 speech, Cawthorn said that Ledford left him "to die in a fiery tomb", which Ledford has disputed. Ledford said in a sworn deposition for insurance litigation that he pulled an unconscious Cawthorn from the wrecked vehicle immediately after getting out himself; in Cawthorn's deposition, he stated that he had "no memory from the accident". In the same 2017 speech, Cawthorn stated that he was "declared dead on the scene" of the accident, but the official accident report listed him as "incapacitated". The injuries from the accident left Cawthorn partially paralyzed, requiring the use of a wheelchair. He said he accrued $3 million in medical debt during his recovery; he received that amount as settlement from an insurance company, as well as other payments, and as of February 2021 was seeking $30 million more.

Rep. Mark Meadows had nominated Cawthorn to the United States Naval Academy in December 2013, but his application was rejected. Although this happened before his injury, he claimed in advertisements for his 2020 congressional campaign that the accident "derailed" his plans to attend the academy. Cawthorn had acknowledged in 2017 under oath that he had been turned down before the accident. When asked in 2020 about the discrepancy, he said, "I never said I was appointed or accepted to the academy, I knew that I'd only been nominated at that point. I fully expected to be accepted and to be appointed, but at that point I hadn't received it."

During the fall 2016 semester, Cawthorn attended Patrick Henry College, studying political science, but earned mostly D grades and dropped out. He said his grades were low primarily because his injuries had interfered with his ability to learn. Cawthorn said in a deposition, "You know, suffering from a brain injury after the accident definitely I think it slowed my brain down a little bit. Made me less intelligent. And the pain also made reading and studying very difficult." He also said he withdrew due to "heartbreak" after his fiancée broke up with him.

== Early career ==
From January 2015 to August 2016, Cawthorn worked as a staff assistant in U.S. Representative Mark Meadows's district office. He told the Asheville Citizen-Times he worked there "full-time", but it was a part-time position.

Cawthorn is the owner and CEO of SPQR Holdings, LLC, a real estate investment firm in Hendersonville. The firm was started in August 2019 and reported no income; Cawthorn is its sole employee. As of August 2020, the company had been involved in only one real estate transaction, purchasing a 6-acre (2.4 ha) property for $20,000, in a foreclosure auction.

== U.S. House of Representatives ==
=== Elections ===
==== 2020 ====
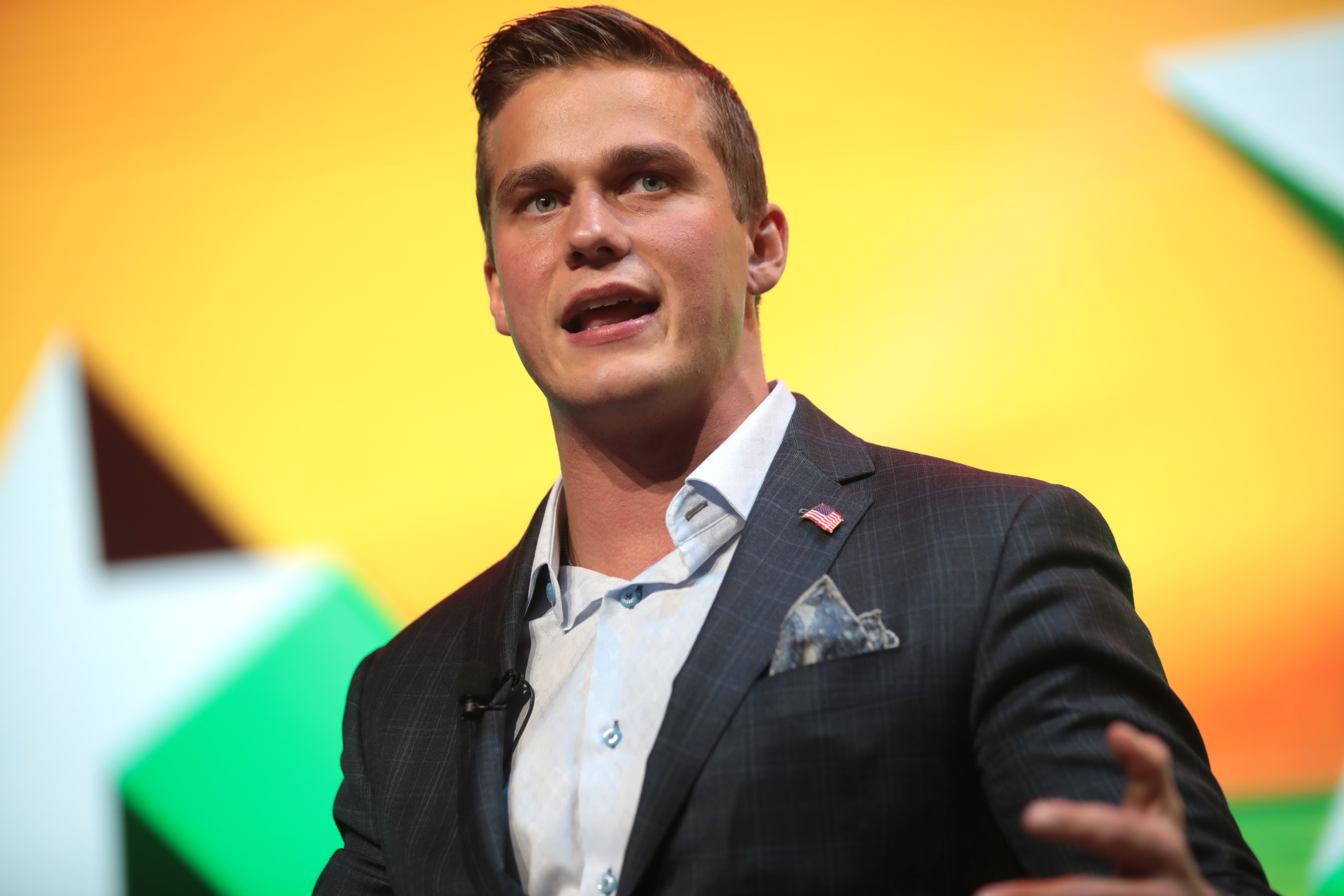
Cawthorn speaking at a Turning Point USA event in 2020

In the March 2020 Republican primary for North Carolina's 11th congressional district, Cawthorn finished second behind Lynda Bennett, who had been endorsed both by President Donald Trump and Meadows, who had become White House Chief of Staff. But Bennett did not receive the required 30% of the vote to avoid a runoff and Cawthorn won the June runoff overwhelmingly. He was supported by many local leaders and endorsed by Mark Walker, the vice chairman of the House Republican Conference. His victory has been called an upset. Cawthorn benefited from false and misleading claims that Bennett was a "Never-Trumper".

In a July 2020 event at the Texas border, Cawthorn declared, without providing evidence, that there was "a large group of cartels, kidnapping our American children and then taking them to sell them on a slave market, a sex slave market".

During the 2020 general campaign, his Democratic opponent drew attention to a 2017 Cawthorn Instagram post with a picture of his visit to Adolf Hitler's vacation residence Eagle's Nest, which he said had been on his "bucket list for a while", generating allegations of far-right sympathies. He had referred to Hitler as "the Führer", which had been Hitler's official title, and called Hitler "a supreme evil". In response, Cawthorn called the allegations that he was a white supremacist ridiculous, saying that he "completely and wholeheartedly denounce[s] any kind of white nationalism, any kind of Nazism". The Anti-Defamation League's analyst Mark Pitcavage said he did not see much merit in the accusations against Cawthorn. Some Jewish residents of his congressional district expressed concern about the incident, including Esther Manheimer, mayor of Asheville, the district's largest city. Cawthorn deleted the Instagram post on August 10.

Cawthorn spoke on the third day of the 2020 Republican National Convention. During his election bid, Cawthorn's campaign created a website to criticize journalist Tom Fiedler, who had produced investigative pieces on Cawthorn and had written favorably about his opponent. The website accused Fiedler of leaving academia "to work for non-white males, like Cory Booker, who aims to ruin white males running for office." The sentence on the website was later modified to claim Fiedler is "an unapologetic defender of left-wing identity politics". Cawthorn released a statement saying he had intended "to condemn" such political opinion as being "dangerous and divisive" and said that he "condemned racism and identity politics throughout [his] campaign." Ben Mathis-Lilley, writing for Slate, said that Cawthorn's apology was "not an apology for attacking the journalist in question, Tom Fiedler, as a traitor to his race."

In the November general election, Cawthorn defeated Democratic nominee Moe Davis. He took office on January 3, 2021. Upon hearing he had won, he tweeted, "cry more, lib".

Cawthorn was the youngest Republican to serve in the 117th Congress, and, at 25, was one of the youngest members ever elected to the House of Representatives. He is also the first member of Congress born in the 1990s.

==== 2022 ====
In November 2021, Cawthorn announced that instead of running for re-election in North Carolina's 11th district he would instead run in the new 13th congressional district, which includes Cleveland County and other counties west of Charlotte. Most of Cawthorn's former territory, including his home in Hendersonville, had become the 14th district, but members of Congress are not required to live in the district they represent but merely in the same state. He wrote on Twitter that he was running in the 13th district because otherwise "another establishment, go-along-to-get-along Republican would prevail there." Describing some of Cawthorn's political missteps and disputes in his home district, the Asheville Citizen-Times wrote: "The emerging opposition to Cawthorn in his current district appears to provide a political rationale for skipping into the new 13th Congressional District." Cawthorn later filed to run again in the 11th district, after new maps were approved in February.

On May 17, 2022, Cawthorn was defeated by Republican primary challenger Chuck Edwards, a state senator and fellow Henderson County resident, by a margin of 33.4–31.9%. Cawthorn conceded the race later that day. Edwards had been supported by Senator Thom Tillis and most of the North Carolina General Assembly. Railing against "the cowardly and weak members of our own party", Cawthorn wrote: "It's time for the rise of the new right, it's time for Dark MAGA to truly take command." "Dark MAGA" references a fringe movement advocating a vengeful return of Trumpism.

===== 14th Amendment challenge =====
In January 2022, a group of North Carolina voters formally challenged Cawthorn's qualifications to run again, "citing his participation in a rally last January in Washington that questioned the presidential election outcome and preceded the Capitol riot." The challenge is based on Section 3 of the 14th Amendment, which prohibits anyone who has "engaged in insurrection or rebellion" against the U.S. government from holding public office. Under North Carolina law, the burden is on Cawthorn to show through a preponderance of the evidence that he is not an insurrectionist. The challenge was on hold while redistricting litigation continued.

Cawthorn filed suit in the United States District Court for the Eastern District of North Carolina to dismiss the challenge before the state elections board could hear it. The North Carolina Attorney General's office, citing a 1919 application of the amendment to a congressman who had violated the Espionage Act, argued that the 14th Amendment could apply to Cawthorn "if a state board determines he aided or encouraged the Jan. 6, 2021, attack on the Capitol." In March 2022, Chief Judge Richard Myers of the United States District Court for the Eastern District of North Carolina ruled in Cawthorn's favor based on the Amnesty Act that gave amnesty to ex-Confederates following the American Civil War. However, on May 24, 2022, the United States Court of Appeals for the Fourth Circuit reversed the federal district court ruling and instead ruled that the Amnesty Act applied only to people who committed "constitutionally wrongful acts" before 1872. The appeals court did not determine whether Cawthorn is eligible for office; it only determined that the Amnesty Act does not shield him from disqualification.

==== 2026 ====
On October 1, 2025, Cawthorn announced a campaign to return to Congress, now running in Florida's 19th congressional district, held by Republican Byron Donalds. Cawthorn had moved to Florida after his congressional term ended in 2023. Donalds decided to run for Governor of Florida instead of re-election. Cawthorn told Fox News that he was inspired to run after the conservative commentator and activist Charlie Kirk was shot and killed four weeks earlier. Axios reported that Cawthorn had been meeting with Republicans in Washington to lay the groundwork for a campaign at least a week before Kirk's assassination. Another candidate for the Florida seat, Chris Collins, also previously served in Congress from a different state, having represented New York's 27th congressional district from 2013 to 2019. Cawthorn finished fourth in the Republican primary.

=== Tenure ===
The Washington Post reported that during his candidacy and time in Congress, Cawthorn became known for incendiary rhetoric and for promulgating conspiracy theories. He had said he intended to use his position to be a messenger rather than a legislator, writing to his colleagues, "I have built my staff around comms rather than legislation." Cawthorn subsequently closed all but one district office.

==== 2020 ====
In December 2020, at a Turning Point USA conference in Florida, Cawthorn said that he would try to contest the 2020 presidential election results when Congress counted the Electoral College votes in January, citing fraud, though there was no evidence that fraud affected the election results. He subsequently used conspiracy theories about fraud to run advertisements and raise money for himself. He called on the TPUSA event's attendees to "lightly threaten" their representatives.

==== 2021 ====
Cawthorn took his seat as a member of Congress at the start of the 117th Congress on January 3, 2021.

Before Trump supporters stormed the United States Capitol on January 6, Cawthorn addressed the crowd and said, "this crowd has some fight." He voted not to certify the Electoral College results in Congress and called Republicans who voted to certify the results "spineless cowards". He repeated the false conspiracy theories that there was widespread fraud in the election. After the riots, Cawthorn denounced the violence and said, "The party as a whole should have been much more wise about their choice of words." He later attempted to blame the riots on a "Democratic machine" of "agitators strategically placed inside of this group", amid intensifying calls for his resignation for his part in stoking the riots.

On January 20, the day of Joe Biden's inauguration, Cawthorn was one of seventeen newly elected House Republicans to sign a letter congratulating him and expressing hope of bipartisan cooperation. On January 22, 2021, the government watchdog group Campaign for Accountability asked the Office of Congressional Ethics to investigate Cawthorn's role in the January 6 Capitol riot.

On January 23, on CNN Newsroom, Pamela Brown asked Cawthorn about his views of the election results. He said, "You know, the Constitution allowed for us to be able to push back as much as we could and I did that to the amount of the constitutional limits that I had at my disposal. So now I would say that Joseph R. Biden is our president". According to Time, Cawthorn was "trying to have it both ways. One day, he's preaching about respecting the office of the Presidency and vowing to work across the aisle with Democratic colleagues. The next, he's trumpeting dangerous conspiracies to right-wing crowds and commentators."

In late February 2021, Cawthorn and a dozen other Republican House members skipped votes and enlisted others to vote for them, citing the ongoing COVID-19 pandemic. But he and the other members were actually attending the Conservative Political Action Conference, which was held at the same time as their absences. In response, the Campaign for Accountability, an ethics watchdog group, filed a complaint with the House Committee on Ethics and requested an investigation into Cawthorn and the other lawmakers. In July 2021, another ethics complaint was filed against Cawthorn by an aide to Representative David McKinley after Cawthorn first scolded a McKinley aide and later got into a shouting match with McKinley over being listed as a co-sponsor of McKinley's bill.

At an August 2021 Republican Party event in Macon County, Cawthorn said: "if our election systems continue to be rigged and continue to be stolen, then it's going to lead to one place—and it's bloodshed." He then said, "as much as I am willing to defend our liberty at all costs, there is nothing that I would dread doing more than having to pick up arms against a fellow American", with the only way to prevent that being "election security".

In October 2021, Cawthorn said, "our culture today is trying to completely de-masculate [sic] all of the young men", because "they don't want people who are going to stand up". He issued a call to mothers, who he said are the "most vicious" conservatives: "If you are raising a young man, please raise them to be a monster". In November 2021, Cawthorn accused politicians of "trying to make everyone genderless, sexless, and just absolutely Godless", and declared that Americans "want our culture back, and if you want to stand in the way of that, we will run you over."

Cawthorn reacted to the not guilty verdict in the trial of Kyle Rittenhouse by offering Rittenhouse an internship, saying, "You have a right to defend yourself, so be armed, be dangerous and be moral".

==== 2022 ====
During the 2022 Russian invasion of Ukraine, Cawthorn called Ukrainian president Volodymyr Zelenskyy a "thug" and said "the Ukrainian government is incredibly corrupt and is incredibly evil and has been pushing woke ideologies." Cawthorn wrote on Twitter that his comments were based on Zelenskyy's having allegedly spread misinformation directed at Americans. Alyssa Farah Griffin, for whom Cawthorn once interned, condemned his comments as based on ignorance and spreading Russian propaganda.

In a March 2022 interview, Cawthorn talked about "the sexual perversion that goes on in Washington" and said he had been invited to an orgy by an unnamed lawmaker. He also claimed that prominent Washington figures had used cocaine in front of him. In a closed-door meeting, multiple House Republicans complained about his comments. Members of the Freedom Caucus considered ejecting Cawthorn from its membership. House Minority Leader Kevin McCarthy and Minority Whip Steve Scalise then met with Cawthorn. McCarthy later told reporters that Cawthorn had admitted his claims were exaggerated or untrue: "He changes what he tells and that's not becoming of a congressman. He did not tell the truth [and] that's unacceptable." McCarthy said he had told Cawthorn that "He's lost my trust. He's going to have to earn it back."

In April 2022, Senator Thom Tillis called for an investigation into Cawthorn for possible violations of the STOCK Act, stating that Cawthorn's purchase of an anti-Biden "Let's Go Brandon" cryptocurrency without disclosure may have violated insider trading rules for members of Congress. By December 2022, it was reported that Cawthorn had violated the STOCK Act a total of three times that year for failing to disclose hundreds of thousands of dollars' worth of sales in Let's Go Brandon coin, Bitcoin, and Ethereum.

Also in April 2022, American Muckrakers PAC requested an ethics investigation of Cawthorn's relationship with his aide Stephen Smith, Cawthorn's second cousin. The request said that Cawthorn had provided more than $250 worth of free housing and travel to Smith in violation of House rules. American Muckrakers provided documents that appeared to show that Smith lived for free in a house owned by Cawthorn. The request also alleged that the two may have had a sexual relationship. It alleged that Smith went with Cawthorn on his honeymoon and mentioned "a video that appears to show Smith placing his hand on Cawthorn's crotch". Sexual relationships between lawmakers and staffers are prohibited.

In May 2022, The Daily Beast reported that Blake Harp, Cawthorn's chief of staff, who was paid $131,278 in that position in 2021, also received $73,237 in that year from Cawthorn's campaign, despite House ethics rules that limit senior staff to earning $29,595 in outside income each year. Harp has also received payments from the campaign committee of Harp's mother, who ran unsuccessfully for Congress. Harp was Cawthorn's campaign manager in 2020, becoming chief of staff in 2021.

On November 16, 2022, Joel Burgess of the Asheville Citizen-Times wrote Cawthorn had vacated and shut down his offices two months before the end of his term. He subsequently purchased a $1.1 million home in Florida. Responding to the news that constituent services calls were not being handled, Rep.-elect Chuck Edwards—who had defeated Cawthorn in the Republican congressional primary, and won the general election—invited people to contact his state senate office instead.

=== Political positions ===
During his 2020 campaign, Cawthorn said that he would "like to be the face of the Republican Party when it comes to health care."

Cawthorn identifies as a constitutional conservative and describes his position on abortion rights as pro-life or anti-abortion. In 2021, he joined the House Freedom Caucus, a caucus of conservative House Republicans. He describes himself as "fiscally conservative", says his stance on immigration is "conservative", and supports legal gun ownership, opposing gun control legislation.

Cawthorn supports legal same-sex marriage, but opposes gender transition treatments for minors. He also supports removing Confederate statues because they commemorate secession from the United States, though in June 2021 he voted against a bill that would remove statues of white supremacists and Confederates from the United States Capitol. In 2022, Cawthorn voted against the Respect for Marriage Act, legislation to codify same-sex marriage into federal law.

Cawthorn has said that climate change is "pretty minimal".

Cawthorn falsely asserted that the 2020 presidential election was fraudulent, though he backtracked on the claim during a January 2021 CNN interview with Pamela Brown.

Cawthorn sponsored H.R. 6206, the American Tech Workforce Act of 2021, introduced by Representative Jim Banks. The legislation would establish a wage floor for the high-skill H-1B visa program, thereby significantly reducing employer dependence on the program. The bill would also eliminate the Optional Practical Training program that allows foreign graduates to stay and work in the United States.

=== Committee assignments ===
- House Committee on Education and Labor
- House Committee on Veterans' Affairs

=== Caucus memberships ===
- Republican Study Committee
- Freedom Caucus

== Personal life ==
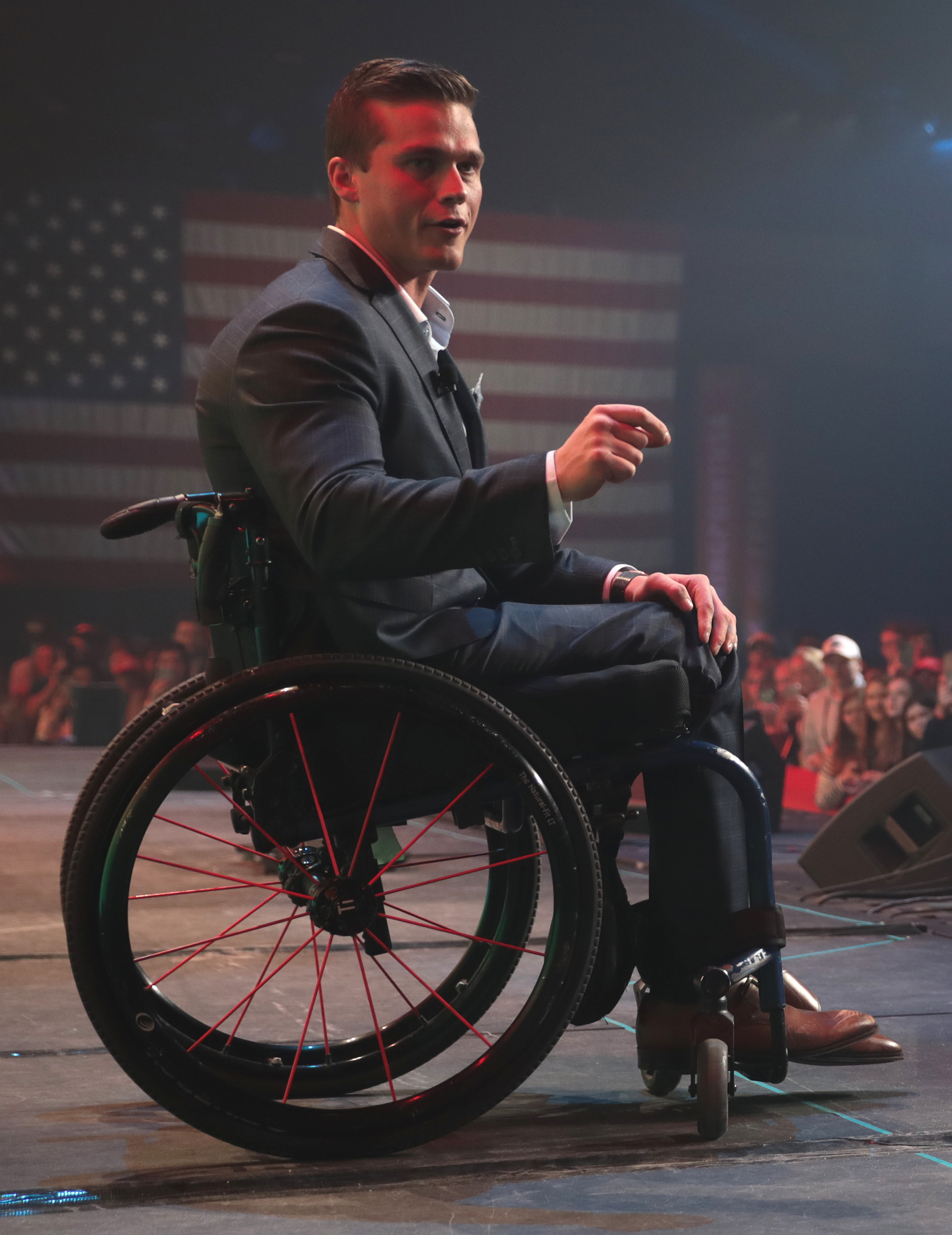
Cawthorn in 2020

Cawthorn describes himself as a Christian. He has an older brother.

Cawthorn married Cristina Bayardelle, a college student and competitive CrossFit athlete, in a December 2020 civil ceremony, followed by an April 2021 outdoor ceremony. In December 2021, Cawthorn announced they were getting divorced. In April 2026, Cawthorn announced his engagement to Alisya Mata.

Cawthorn relocated from North Carolina to Cape Coral, Florida, after his term in Congress ended in 2023.

Cawthorn said that he trained in wheelchair racing for the 2020 Summer Paralympics, but never competed at a qualifying level and was not involved in a team.

== Controversies ==
=== Sexual misconduct allegations ===
In August 2020, during Cawthorn's campaign for Congress, several women accused him of sexually aggressive behavior, sexual misconduct, and sexual assault.

Katrina Krulikas described an incident when she was 17 and Cawthorn was 19 in which he pressured her to sit on his lap and attempted to kiss her forcibly twice, which she resisted. Cawthorn did not deny the allegations, but said, "I did try and kiss her, just very normal, just in a flirtatious way", adding, "If I did make her feel unsafe, I feel bad", but questioned the timing of her allegation. His campaign characterized Krulikas's allegations as politically motivated, which she denied.

After Krulikas made her allegations, three other women made allegations of sexual misconduct against Cawthorn, including forcible grabbing and kissing. One woman said Cawthorn called her "just a little blonde, slutty American girl" when she rejected his sexual advances.

On October 17, 2020, a group of Patrick Henry College alumni released a public letter accusing Cawthorn of "sexually predatory behavior" while he was a student there for a little more than one semester, as well as of vandalism and lying. The letter originally had ten signatories but the number increased to over 150 alumni in less than a week. Cawthorn claimed that most of the signers did not know him personally and his campaign posted a response letter of support for him signed by six alumni, two of whom work for Cawthorn's campaign. Cawthorn's response letter implied support by former Patrick Henry College President Michael Farris; Farris disavowed the support letter and asked that he not be associated with it.

A February 2021 BuzzFeed News investigation found 20 people who said that Cawthorn had harassed his female classmates during college; the reporters spoke to four women who said he had harassed them. It was alleged that Cawthorn often recklessly drove women in his car to remote areas off campus while asking them sexual questions: he reportedly called these journeys "fun drives". Two resident assistants said they warned women to avoid Cawthorn and not to ride in his car. A male acquaintance said Cawthorn bragged about pulling a woman into his lap and putting a finger between her legs.

=== Circulation of nude video ===
On May 4, 2022, a video began circulating online that showed Cawthorn naked in bed, thrusting his genitals toward another man's face while moaning. Cawthorn said of the video, "Years ago, in this video, I was being crass with a friend, trying to be funny. We were acting foolish, and joking. That's it." He called the video "blackmail" on Twitter after he had released an eight-minute video addressing it and other controversies.

=== Legal issues ===
In February 2021, Transportation Security Administration agents at the Asheville Regional Airport discovered an unloaded Glock 9mm handgun and loaded magazine in Cawthorn's carry-on bag. A spokesman for Cawthorn said the gun, magazine, and ammunition were meant to have been stowed in his checked luggage.

In March 2022, Cawthorn was charged with driving while his license was revoked and while two speeding tickets were pending. He faced possible time in jail. Later that month, he agreed to a lesser improper speedometer charge for an October 2021 ticket in Buncombe County and paid over $200 in fines and fees. A 2017 charge of driving on a revoked license had been dismissed. Cawthorn had court dates in Polk and Cleveland counties in June 2022 for speeding and driving with a revoked license. His Polk County court date (for speeding in January 2022) was moved to February 2023, and his revoked license charge was dismissed by the Cleveland County district attorney's office in late 2022. Cawthorn moved to Florida after leaving political office and his attorney entered a guilty plea to a lesser speeding charge with a fine of about $200 in a deal that resolved his driving offenses.

In April 2022, Cawthorn was briefly detained at an airport in Charlotte, North Carolina, for attempting to board a commercial flight with a loaded handgun in his carry-on luggage. Police said he was cooperative, and he was cited for possession of a dangerous weapon on city property. On May 5, 2023, Cawthorn pleaded guilty and was fined $250.

In April 2024, Cawthorn received a traffic citation in Florida when he crashed his car into a state trooper vehicle in a construction zone.

On September 11, 2025, Cawthorn was arrested in Florida after failing to appear in court the previous day, for a citation he received for driving without a license. He was released on a $2,000 bond. In a statement, Cawthorn stated that he missed the hearing "due to a scheduling misunderstanding."

In April 2025, Cawthorn paid a $17,458 fine to the Federal Election Commission (FEC) pursuant to his duties as treasurer of his campaign committee. In 2022 the campaign committee, named MADISON PAC, missed filing a quarterly financial report with the FEC. In 2024, the FEC assessed a civil penalty against Cawthorn. Cawthorn paid the fine about half a year later after the FEC threatened to seize assets. He also terminated the campaign committee.

== Electoral history ==
=== 2020 ===
North Carolina's 11th congressional district Republican primary
Party	Candidate	Votes	%
Republican	Lynda Bennett	20,606	22.7
Republican	Madison Cawthorn	18,481	20.4
Republican	Jim Davis	17,465	19.3
Republican	Chuck Archerd	8,272	9.1
Republican	Wayne King	7,876	8.7
Republican	Dan Driscoll	7,803	8.6
Republican	Joey Osborne	6,470	7.1
Republican	Vance Patterson	2,242	2.5
Republican	Matthew Burril	523	0.6
Republican	Albert Wiley Jr.	393	0.4
Republican	Dillon Gentry	390	0.4
Republican	Steve Fekete Jr.	175	0.2
Total votes		90,696	100.0

North Carolina's 11th congressional district Republican primary runoff
Party	Candidate	Votes	%
Republican	Madison Cawthorn	30,636	65.8
Republican	Lynda Bennett	15,905	34.2
Total votes		46,541	100.0

North Carolina's 11th congressional district general election
Party	Candidate	Votes	%
Republican	Madison Cawthorn	245,351	54.5
Democratic	Moe Davis	190,609	42.4
Libertarian	Tracey DeBruhl	8,682	1.9
Green	Tamara Zwinak	5,503	1.2
Total votes		450,145	100.0
Republican hold			

=== 2022 ===
North Carolina's 11th congressional district Republican primary
Party	Candidate	Votes	%
Republican	Chuck Edwards	29,496	33.4
Republican	Madison Cawthorn (incumbent)	28,112	31.9
Republican	Matthew Burril	8,341	9.5
Republican	Bruce O'Connell	6,037	6.9
Republican	Rod Honeycutt	5,775	6.5
Republican	Michele Woodhouse	4,668	5.3
Republican	Wendy Nevarez	4,525	5.1
Republican	Kristie Sluder	1,304	1.5
Total votes		88,258	100.0

=== 2026 ===
Florida's 19th congressional district Republican primary
Party	Candidate	Votes	%
Republican	Jim Schwartzel	26,153	29.1
Republican	Catalina Lauf	19,722	22.0
Republican	Jim Oberweis	14,110	15.7
Republican	Madison Cawthorn	7,596	8.5
Republican	Chris Collins	6,617	7.4
Republican	Mike Pedersen	5,581	6.2
Republican	John Strand	3,513	3.9
Republican	Ola Hawatmeh	2,534	2.8
Republican	Greg "Tex" Bukowski	2,266	2.5
Republican	Linda Sawyer	1,650	1.8
Total votes		89,742	100.0

U.S. House of Representatives
Preceded by Mark Meadows	Member of the U.S. House of Representatives from North Carolina's 11th congressional district 2021–2023	Succeeded by Chuck Edwards
Honorary titles
Preceded by Alexandria Ocasio-Cortez	Baby of the House; 2021–2023	Succeeded by Maxwell Frost
U.S. order of precedence (ceremonial)
Preceded by David Funderburk as Former U.S. Representative	Order of precedence of the United States as Former U.S. Representative	Succeeded by Jeff Jackson as Former U.S. Representative
