= Chuck McGrady =

American politician from North Carolina

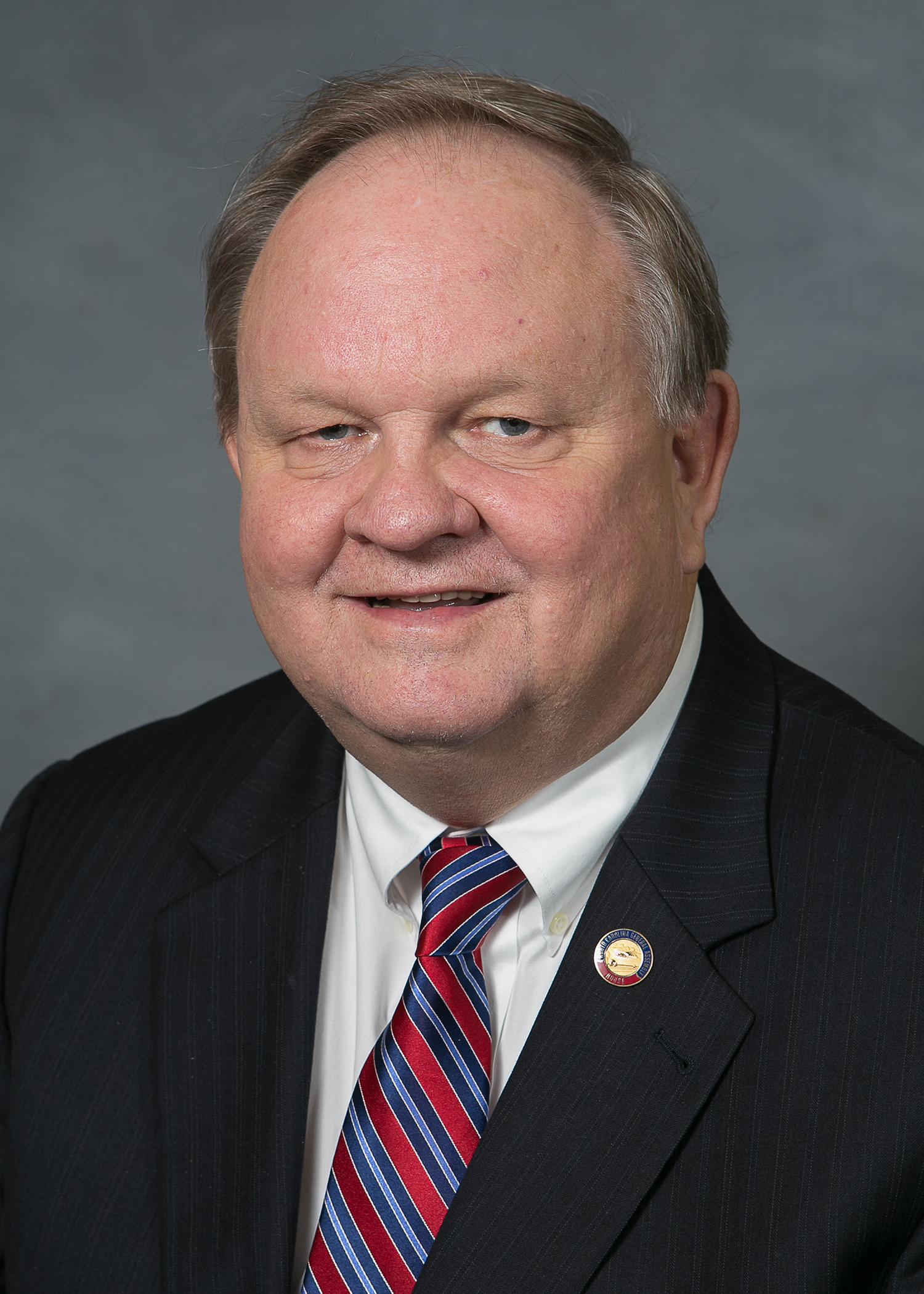

Member of the North Carolina House of Representatives from the 117th district
- In office January 1, 2011 – October 5, 2020
- Preceded by: Carolyn Justus
- Succeeded by: Tim Moffitt

Member of the Henderson County Board of Commissioners from the 5th district
- In office December 6, 2004 – December 3, 2010
- Preceded by: Grady Hawkins
- Succeeded by: Bill O'Connor

Personal details
- Born: March 6, 1953 (age 73) Baltimore, Maryland, U.S.
- Party: Republican
- Spouse: Jean
- Children: 2
- Education: Rhodes College (BA); Mercer University (JD)

Chuck McGrady (born March 6, 1953) is a former Republican member of the North Carolina House of Representatives. He represented the 117th district from 2011 until 2020.

== Early life and education ==
McGrady was born in Baltimore, Maryland. He earned a B.A. from Rhodes College in 1975 and his J.D. Mercer University School of Law in 1978.

== Career ==
From 1978 to 1979, he taught law at Wayne State University Law School; after that he was a law clerk and then a corporate counsel until 1992, when he became Executive Director of the Environmental & Conservation Organization of Henderson County. He was an early leader of the Carolina Mountain Land Conservancy and served as President of the Sierra Club from 1998 to 2000. In 2009–10 he was Executive Director of the North Carolina Youth Camp Association, and he is director emeritus of Falling Creek Camp in Tuxedo, North Carolina.

=== Political career ===
He served on the council of the Village of Flat Rock from 1997 to 2001. In 2004 he was elected to the Henderson County Board of Commissioners, where he served until being elected to the North Carolina General Assembly in 2010, succeeding Carolyn Justus. He was the chairman of the House Appropriations and Alcoholic Beverage Control Committees for the 2019-20 session. In May 2019, McGrady announced that he would not seek re-election in 2020.

In 2026, it was announced that McGrady would serve on Jamie Ager's transition team, following his win in the 2026 North Carolina United States House Election.

== Electoral history ==
=== 2018 ===
North Carolina House of Representatives 117th district general election, 2018
Party	Candidate	Votes	%
Republican	Chuck McGrady (incumbent)	20,596	60.06%
Democratic	Gayle Kemp	13,699	39.94%
Total votes		34,295	100%
Republican hold			

=== 2016 ===
North Carolina House of Representatives 117th district general election, 2016
Party	Candidate	Votes	%
Republican	Chuck McGrady (incumbent)	30,659	100%
Total votes		30,659	100%
Republican hold			

=== 2014 ===
North Carolina House of Representatives 117th district Republican primary election, 2014
Party	Candidate	Votes	%
Republican	Chuck McGrady (incumbent)	4,815	61.70%
Republican	Ronnie Edwards	2,989	38.30%
Total votes		7,804	100%

North Carolina House of Representatives 117th district general election, 2014
Party	Candidate	Votes	%
Republican	Chuck McGrady (incumbent)	17,292	74.76%
Libertarian	Shelby Mood	5,838	25.24%
Total votes		23,130	100%
Republican hold			

=== 2012 ===
North Carolina House of Representatives 117th district Republican primary election, 2012
Party	Candidate	Votes	%
Republican	Chuck McGrady (incumbent)	6,481	57.34%
Republican	Roger Snyder	4,822	42.66%
Total votes		11,303	100%

North Carolina House of Representatives 117th district general election, 2012
Party	Candidate	Votes	%
Republican	Chuck McGrady (incumbent)	26,217	100%
Total votes		26,217	100%
Republican hold			

=== 2010 ===
North Carolina House of Representatives 117th district general election, 2010
Party	Candidate	Votes	%
Republican	Chuck McGrady	20,331`	100%
Total votes		20,331	100%
Republican hold			

=== 2008 ===
Henderson County Board of Commissioners 5th district general election, 2008
Party	Candidate	Votes	%
Republican	Chuck McGrady (incumbent)	30,430	62.11%
Democratic	Sam Selph	18,562	37.89%
Total votes		48,992	100%
Republican hold			

North Carolina House of Representatives
Preceded by Carolyn Justus	Member of the North Carolina House of Representatives from the 117th District; 2011–2020	Succeeded by Tim Moffitt
