= Chuck Edwards =

American politician (born 1960)

- Official portrait, 2025

Member of the U.S. House of Representatives from North Carolina's 11th district
- Incumbent
- Assumed office January 3, 2023
- Preceded by: Madison Cawthorn

Member of the North Carolina Senate from the 48th district
- In office August 19, 2016 – January 1, 2023
- Preceded by: Tom Apodaca
- Succeeded by: Tim Moffitt

Personal details
- Born: Charles Marion Edwards; September 13, 1960 (age 66) Waynesville, North Carolina, U.S.
- Party: Republican
- Spouse: Teresa Edwards
- Children: 2 (1 deceased)
- Education: Blue Ridge Community College (attended)
- Website: House website Campaign website

Charles Marion Edwards (born September 13, 1960) is an American politician serving as the U.S. representative for North Carolina's 11th congressional district since 2023. A member of the Republican Party, he represented the 48th district in the North Carolina Senate from 2016 to 2023.

In 2026, Edwards was investigated and censured by the House Committee on Ethics over allegations that he had behaved inappropriately with female staffers. Following the release of the committee's report, which included a recommendation that he be censured, he ended his bid for re-election that fall.

== Early life and education ==
Edwards was born in Waynesville, North Carolina. He graduated from West Henderson High School in 1978 and studied business, accounting, and marketing at Blue Ridge Community College.

== Career ==
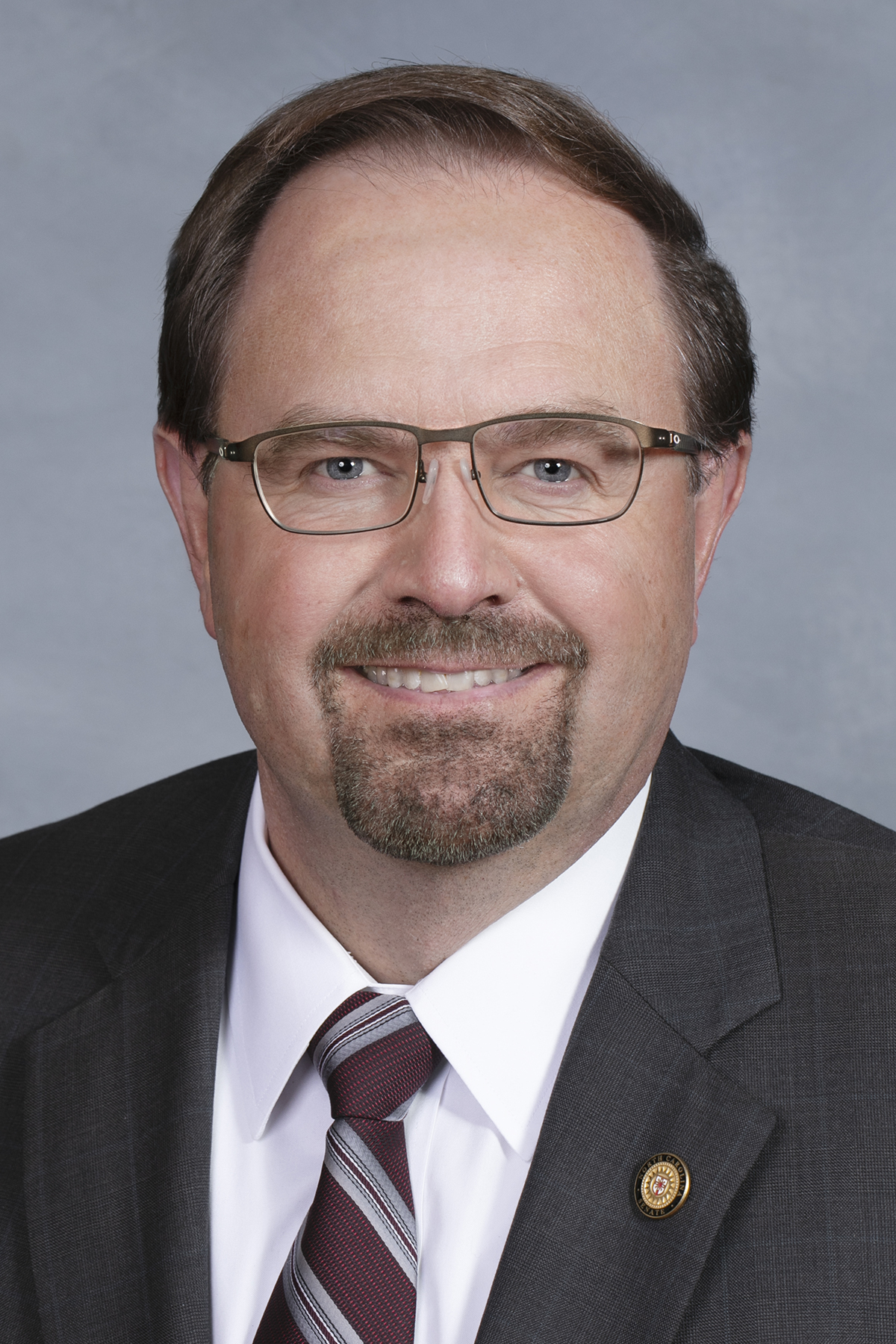
Edwards' state senatorial portrait, c. 2019

Edwards joined McDonald's in 1989, working as an operations manager until 1991, senior business consultant from 1991 to 1996, and development coordinator from 1996 to 1998. He also worked as the vice president of Henderson County Partners for Economic Progress. In 2013, he became a director of Entegra Financial Corporation. In 2020, Entegra merged with First Citizens Bank. In 2026, Edwards sold all of his holdings in McDonalds so he could focus more on his legislative career.

Edwards was appointed to the North Carolina Senate in August 2016 after Tom Apodaca resigned. He defeated Democratic nominee Norman Bossert in 2016, and was reelected in 2018 and 2020. In 2024, Edwards held a ceremony and awarded Donald Trump with a French Fry Certification Pin, an award that Edwards created (this is an honorary award, and not an actual certification given by the McDonald's Corporation). C Edwards Group, Inc. operates McDonald's restaurants in the western North Carolina communities of Hendersonville, Brevard and Canton which have been the target of protest events.

== U.S. House of Representatives ==
=== Elections ===
==== 2022 ====
On November 30, 2021, Edwards declared his candidacy for North Carolina's 11th congressional district in the 2022 election. The district was represented by freshman Republican incumbent Madison Cawthorn. Cawthorn faced numerous scandals, had made many controversial statements, and was criticized by Edwards as an ineffective legislator. Edwards was also endorsed by U.S. Senator Thom Tillis.

On May 17, 2022, Edwards defeated Cawthorn in the Republican primary with 33.4% of the vote. Although he lost 12 of the district's 15 counties, he carried Buncombe, its most populous, by over 2,000 votes, exceeding his overall margin of 1,338. Edwards also defeated Cawthorn in Henderson County, where they both lived, by 3,191 votes.

In March 2025, Edwards held a town hall meeting in Asheville, North Carolina, that became contentious as constituents questioned him about federal policy and proposed government cuts. Attendees repeatedly interrupted and booed his responses during the event, and security ultimately escorted Edwards from the building.

==== 2024 ====
In 2024, Edwards ran for reelection winning with 57% of the vote over Democrat Caleb Rudow.

==== 2026 ====
Edwards filed for re-election to his seat in December 2025. On April 30, 2026, reports emerged that the House Ethics Committee was investigating him over sexual harassment allegations. On August 3, the committee released its report, concluding that Edwards "fostered a hostile work environment and engaged in sexual harassment" by engaging in "persistent unprofessional and inappropriate conduct" towards two young female staffers. It was recommended that he be censured by Congress for his alleged misconduct. Initially, Edwards denied harassing his staffers and said he would exonerate himself; on August 5, he announced that he would no longer be running for re-election. He was replaced on the November ballot by Jennifer Balkcom after being selected by the North Carolina Republican Party.

=== Committee assignments ===
United States House Committee on Appropriations

- National Security, Department of State, and Related Programs Subcommittee (vice chair)
- Financial Services and General Government Subcommittee

United States House Committee on the Budget

=== Caucus memberships ===
- Congressional YIMBY Caucus (co-chair)
- Congressional Aggregates Caucus
- Congressional Fire Services Caucus
- Congressional Pro-Life Caucus
- Congressional Sportsmen's Caucus
- Conservative Climate Caucus
- Election Integrity Caucus
- Fix Congress Caucus
- Main Street Caucus
- Problem Solvers Caucus
- Republican Study Committee

== Political positions ==
=== Abortion ===
In 2022, Edwards stated his opposition to the 1973 Roe v. Wade court decision, and said it should be overturned.

=== Foreign policy ===
In March 2026, Edwards said he supports Trump's decision to enter the 2026 Iran war. Edwards said Trump did not require congressional authorization for the war. In June 2026, he voted against a war powers resolution intended to limit the war in Iran while it lacked authorization from Congress.

=== Immigration ===
In January 2024, Edwards introduced legislation which would prevent immigrants from being counted by the United States census, for the purposes of determining the United States congressional apportionment. In February 2024, Edwards posted a picture on X of a large migrant caravan in Mexico to criticize the immigration policies of the Biden administration, suggesting that Joe Biden was at fault for the migrants in the picture immigrating to the United States. However, the picture was taken in 2018, during the administration of Donald Trump.

== Electoral history ==
=== U.S. House of Representatives ===
North Carolina's 11th congressional district, 2022 Republican primary
Party	Candidate	Votes	%
Republican	Chuck Edwards	29,496	33.4
Republican	Madison Cawthorn (incumbent)	28,112	31.9
Republican	Matthew Burril	8,341	9.5
Republican	Bruce O'Connell	6,037	6.8
Republican	Rod Honeycutt	5,775	6.5
Republican	Michele Woodhouse	4,668	5.3
Republican	Wendy Nevarez	4,525	5.1
Republican	Kristie Sluder	1,304	1.5
Total votes		88,258	100.0

North Carolina's 11th congressional district, 2022 General Election
Party	Candidate	Votes	%
Republican	Chuck Edwards	174,232	53.8
Democratic	Jasmine Beach-Ferrara	144,165	44.5
Libertarian	David Coatney	5,515	1.7
Total votes		323,912	100.0
Republican hold			

North Carolina's 11th congressional district, 2024 General Election
Party	Candidate	Votes	%
Republican	Chuck Edwards (incumbent)	245,546	56.8
Democratic	Caleb Rudow	186,977	43.2
Total votes		432,523	100.0
Republican hold			

== Controversies ==
=== Attacks against Joe and Hunter Biden ===
Acting on a complaint filed by the Henderson County (North Carolina) Democratic Party, Edwards was sanctioned by the House Communications Standards Commission on April 24, 2024, for making personal attacks against Joe Biden and his son, Hunter, in email newsletters sent to constituents in May, June, July, and December 2023. Such attacks are prohibited by federal law and by rules of the House of Representatives when they are sent out as "mass communications" at taxpayer expense.

=== Behavior with female staffers ===
On April 30, 2026, it was revealed that allegations against Edwards of inappropriate behavior with female staff members were being investigated by the House Ethics Committee. On August 3, the Ethics Committee released its report. Edwards was found to have sent gifts, intimate texts and poems, and a guitarist with a message from a "special someone" to two junior staffers; to have had dinners with the staffers which he preferred were kept private; and to have taken the staffers on separate vacations to New York City and Las Vegas, with the second staffer, having left his office, feeling like she had been pressured into agreeing. It was recommended that he be censured for violating the House's rules against sexual harassment, which the House did on September 1.

On August 5, announcing that he had undertaken "much prayer and reflection", Edwards ended his campaign for re-election.

== Personal life ==
Edwards and his wife, Teresa, have had two children. In 2018, his 36-year-old son died by suicide via firearm after a lengthy period of untreated depression, leaving a baby daughter and wife behind.

U.S. House of Representatives
Preceded by Madison Cawthorn	Member of the U.S. House of Representatives from North Carolina's 11th congressional district 2023–present	Incumbent
U.S. order of precedence (ceremonial)
Preceded by Chris Deluzio	United States representatives by seniority 305th	Succeeded by Mike Ezell
