= Carolyn K. Justus =

American politician

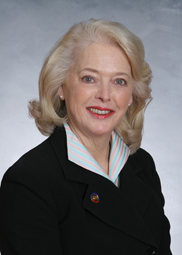
Representative Carolyn K. Justus

Carolyn King Justus (born September 15, 1945) is an American politician, a former Republican member of the North Carolina General Assembly.

Justus graduated from Brevard High School and studied at Gaston Memorial Hospital School of Nursing.

She represented North Carolina's 117th House district, including constituents in Henderson and Transylvania counties, from late 2002 until 2010, when she declined to run for a fifth term and was succeeded by Chuck McGrady. She is the widow of Larry T. Justus, and served as his clerk during his nine terms in the seat; after he died shortly before the 2002 legislative elections, his name was not removed from the ballot and he received a majority of votes cast, so the local Republican party appointed Carolyn Justus to the empty seat for the new term.

Since retiring from the Assembly, she has served as chair of the Henderson County Heritage Museum.

North Carolina House of Representatives
Preceded by Constituency established	Member of the North Carolina House of Representatives from the 117th district 2003–2011	Succeeded by Chuck McGrady
