= Tom Apodaca =

American politician

Senator Tom Apodaca
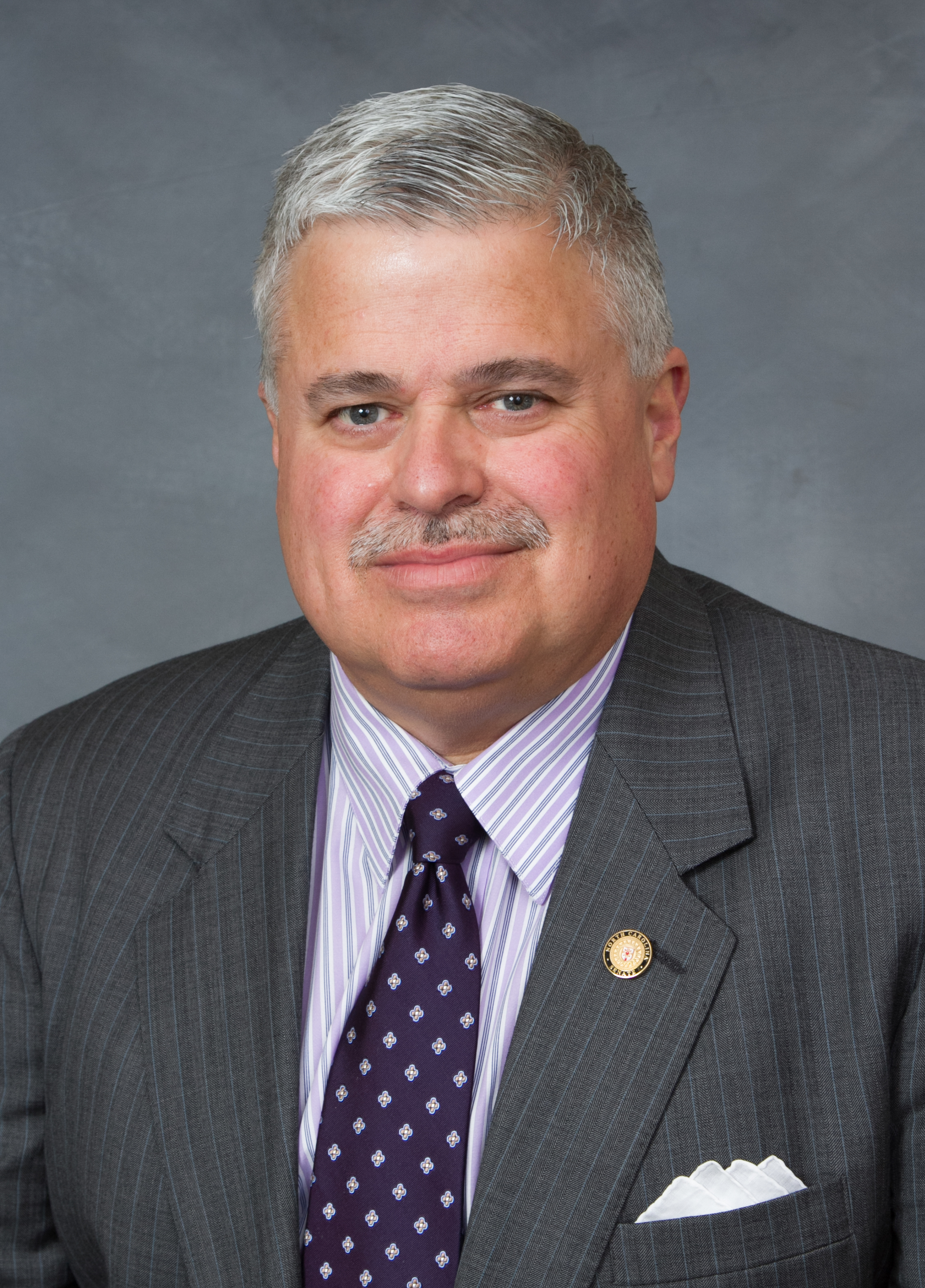

Member of the North Carolina Senate from the 48th district
- In office January 1, 2003 – July 15, 2016
- Preceded by: Charles Newell Carter (Redistricting)
- Succeeded by: Chuck Edwards

Personal details
- Born: Thomas Michael Apodaca; November 8, 1957 (age 68)
- Party: Republican
- Education: Western Carolina University
- Occupation: Entrepreneur

Thomas Michael Apodaca (born November 8, 1957) is a lobbyist and former Republican member of the North Carolina General Assembly representing the state's forty-eighth Senate district, including constituents in Buncombe, Henderson, and Transylvania counties.

== North Carolina Senate ==
Apodaca was elected to the North Carolina Senate in 2002 during his first campaign for public office; he was re-elected by his Western North Carolina constituents until his retirement in July 2016. In addition to chairing the Senate Rules Committee, he co-chaired the Committee on Insurance, the Committee on Pensions & Retirement and Aging, and the Appropriations Subcommittee on Education & Higher Education. He retired before the end of his term in 2016 and was succeeded by Chuck Edwards.

== Controversies ==
In the 2013 legislative session, Apodaca introduced and voted for a bill, Senate Bill 10, to reorganize the Environmental Management Commission and the N.C. Utilities Commission and replace the members with new appointees. This bill included the elimination of dozens of obsolete and rarely convened boards and commissions. Senate Bill 10 was not signed into law in 2013. Sen. Tom Apodaca said his main complaint to the House version was that it strikes language that would fire 12 special superior court judges.

In May 2013, after receiving the maximum $8000 contribution from North Carolina Automobile Dealers Association, Apodaca sponsored legislation that would make it illegal for any car maker to bypass dealerships and sell directly to consumers in North Carolina. Apodaca's proposal was widely criticized as anti-competitive and aimed at insulating automobile dealers from Tesla Motors' business model.

In response to public outcry after a coal ash spill into the Dan River in northern North Carolina from a facility owned by Duke Energy Inc., Apodaca said he planned to draft legislation in May 2014 to require Duke Energy to clean up its coal ash ponds, including the one in Buncombe County. He told the Hendersonville Times-News on February 10, 2014: "I don't want a containment plan, I want a plan to get rid of it. ... We need a five- to 10-year plan to get rid of them because we don't need it sitting there next to the river." Over the course of his time in politics, Apodaca accepted over $65,000 from organizations representing Duke Energy and Progress Energy.

In March 2016, Apodaca led a special session of the North Carolina General Assembly that passed the controversial Public Facilities Privacy & Security Act commonly known as HB2. After this session of congress, Apodaca called on the city of Charlotte to pay the $42,000 cost of the emergency legislative session which led to the bill's passage. After the controversial bill passed, companies such as PayPal withdrew their plans to expand in North Carolina, resulting in the loss of at least four hundred potential jobs for North Carolinians.

== Personal life ==
His wife Lisa is a former public school teacher; they have been married for over 30 years and have two sons. All four Apodacas are graduates of Western Carolina University, where Tom served as a member of the board of trustees.

North Carolina Senate
| Preceded by District Established | Member of the North Carolina Senate from the 48th district 2003-2016 | Succeeded by Chuck Edwards |
