= Larry T. Justus =

American politician

Larry Thomas Justus (30 April 1932 – 20 October 2002) was a Republican member of the North Carolina House of Representatives from Hendersonville, North Carolina, United States; he served nine consecutive terms.

Justus was born in Hendersonville and educated at Dana High School. After graduating from the University of North Carolina, Chapel Hill, he served in the United States Air Force, where he reached the rank of lieutenant colonel.

He was first appointed to the State Assembly in 1985 to fill the 50th District seat vacated by Charles Hughes' resignation. He served nine terms and was seeking re-election for a tenth (to the newly established 117th District) when he died in late October 2002. Because his name remained on the ballot and he received a majority of votes cast, the local Republican party named his widow, Carolyn K. Justus, to fill his seat.

The western campus of the North Carolina Justice Academy was named the Larry T. Justus Western Justice Academy in his honor in 2004.
