= North Carolina's 48th Senate district =

American legislative district

North Carolina's 48th State Senate district
Senator
Tim Moffitt; R–Hendersonville
- Demographics: 81% White; 5% Black; 10% Hispanic; 1% Asian; 1% Other; 3% Multiracial
- Population (2023): 201,926

North Carolina's 48th Senate district is one of 50 districts in the North Carolina Senate. It has been represented by Republican Tim Moffitt since 2023.

== Geography ==
Since 2023, the district has covered all of Henderson counties, Polk, and Rutherford counties. The district overlaps with the 111th, 113th, and 117th state house districts.

== District officeholders since 2003 ==
Senator	Party	Dates	Notes	Counties
District created January 1, 2003.				2003–2013; All of Polk and Henderson counties. Part of Buncombe County.
Tom Apodaca (Hendersonville)	Republican	January 1, 2003 – July 15, 2016	Resigned.	2003–2013; All of Polk and Henderson counties. Part of Buncombe County.
Tom Apodaca (Hendersonville)	Republican	January 1, 2003 – July 15, 2016	Resigned.	2013–2023; All of Transylvania and Henderson counties. Part of Buncombe County.
Vacant		July 15, 2016 - August 19, 2016		2013–2023; All of Transylvania and Henderson counties. Part of Buncombe County.
Chuck Edwards (Flat Rock)	Republican	August 19, 2016 – January 1, 2023	Appointed to finish Apodaca's term. Retired to run for Congress.	2013–2023; All of Transylvania and Henderson counties. Part of Buncombe County.
Tim Moffitt (Hendersonville)	Republican	January 1, 2023 – Present		2023–Present; All of Henderson, Polk, and Rutherford counties.

== Election results ==
=== 2024 ===
North Carolina Senate 48th district general election, 2024
Party	Candidate	Votes	%
Republican	Tim Moffitt (incumbent)	73,373	63.93%
Democratic	Chris Walters	41,399	36.07%
Total votes		114,772	100%
Republican hold			

=== 2022 ===
North Carolina Senate 48th district general election, 2022
Party	Candidate	Votes	%
Republican	Tim Moffitt	54,223	64.79%
Democratic	Jay Carey	29,466	35.21%
Total votes		83,689	100%
Republican hold			

=== 2020 ===
North Carolina Senate 48th district Democratic primary election, 2020
Party	Candidate	Votes	%
Democratic	Brian Caskey	12,795	49.75%
Democratic	Cristal Figueroa	8,535	33.18%
Democratic	Najah Underwood	4,390	17.07%
Total votes		25,720	100%

North Carolina Senate 48th district general election, 2020
Party	Candidate	Votes	%
Republican	Chuck Edwards (incumbent)	68,197	58.90%
Democratic	Brian Caskey	47,580	41.10%
Total votes		115,777	100%
Republican hold			

=== 2018 ===
North Carolina Senate 48th district general election, 2018
Party	Candidate	Votes	%
Republican	Chuck Edwards (incumbent)	49,073	56.26%
Democratic	Norm Bossert	38,147	43.74%
Total votes		87,220	100%
Republican hold			

=== 2016 ===
North Carolina Senate 48th district Republican primary election, 2016
Party	Candidate	Votes	%
Republican	Chuck Edwards	16,655	56.18%
Republican	Lisa Carpenter Baldwin	10,032	33.84%
Republican	Dennis Justice	2,957	9.98%
Total votes		29,644	100%

North Carolina Senate 48th district general election, 2016
Party	Candidate	Votes	%
Republican	Chuck Edwards (incumbent)	61,455	62.04%
Democratic	Norman Bossert	37,596	37.96%
Total votes		99,051	100%
Republican hold			

=== 2014 ===
North Carolina Senate 48th district general election, 2014
Party	Candidate	Votes	%
Republican	Tom Apodaca (incumbent)	37,664	57.42%
Democratic	Rick Wood	27,925	42.58%
Total votes		65,589	100%
Republican hold			

=== 2012 ===
North Carolina Senate 48th district Republican primary election, 2012
Party	Candidate	Votes	%
Republican	Tom Apodaca (incumbent)	18,950	72.92%
Republican	Fremont V. Brown III	7,039	27.08%
Total votes		25,989	100%

North Carolina Senate 48th district general election, 2012
Party	Candidate	Votes	%
Republican	Tom Apodaca (incumbent)	62,736	100%
Total votes		62,736	100%
Republican hold			

=== 2010 ===
North Carolina Senate 48th district general election, 2010
Party	Candidate	Votes	%
Republican	Tom Apodaca (incumbent)	43,457	65.94%
Democratic	Chris Dixon	22,447	34.06%
Total votes		65,904	100%
Republican hold			

=== 2008 ===
North Carolina Senate 48th district general election, 2008
Party	Candidate	Votes	%
Republican	Tom Apodaca (incumbent)	64,183	100%
Total votes		64,183	100%
Republican hold			

=== 2006 ===
North Carolina Senate 48th district general election, 2006
Party	Candidate	Votes	%
Republican	Tom Apodaca (incumbent)	41,210	100%
Total votes		41,210	100%
Republican hold			

=== 2004 ===
North Carolina Senate 48th district general election, 2004
Party	Candidate	Votes	%
Republican	Tom Apodaca (incumbent)	47,832	61.99%
Democratic	Matthew C. Rogers	29,327	38.01%
Total votes		77,159	100%
Republican hold			

=== 2002 ===
North Carolina Senate 48th district Republican primary election, 2002
Party	Candidate	Votes	%
Republican	Tom Apodaca	6,182	34.72%
Republican	Grady H. Hawkins	4,636	26.04%
Republican	Ralph Ledford	4,081	22.92%
Republican	Jesse Ledbetter	2,905	16.32%
Total votes		17,804	100%

North Carolina Senate 48th district general election, 2002
Party	Candidate	Votes	%
Republican	Tom Apodaca	32,685	66.74%
Democratic	Robert Cogburn Burris	16,291	33.26%
Total votes		48,976	100%
Republican gain from Democratic			
